= Udayam (newspaper) =

Telugu-language daily newspaper (1984–1995)

Udayam ఉదయం
- Type: Daily newspaper
- Format: Broadsheet
- Owner: Taraka Prabhu Publishers
- Founder: Dasari Narayana Rao
- Founded: 29 December 1984
- Ceased publication: 23 May 1995
- Language: Telugu
- Headquarters: Hyderabad, Andhra Pradesh, India
- Circulation: 224,000 (first month) (as of 1985)

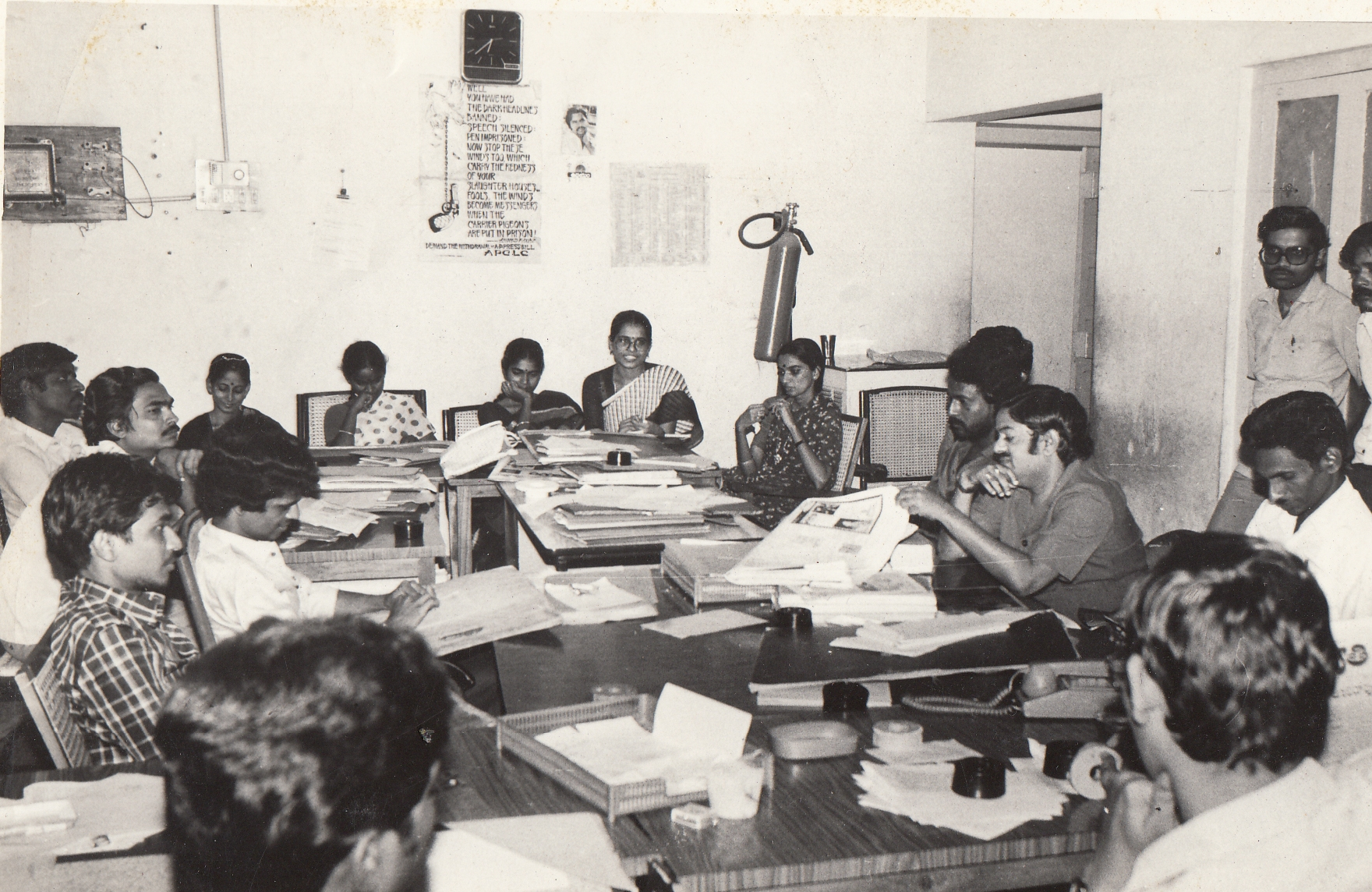
Editors of ‘Udayam’

Udayam (transl. Dawn) was a Telugu-language daily newspaper in India, founded in 1984 by film director Dasari Narayana Rao. Known for its editorial advocacy of marginalized communities, anti-corruption, and democratic ideals, Udayam quickly garnered a strong readership, achieving a circulation of 2,24,000 copies within its first month. This rapid growth established it as the second-most circulated newspaper in Andhra Pradesh at the time, noted especially for its investigative journalism.

Published by Taraka Prabhu Publishers, Dasari Narayana Rao served as chairman, with Ramakrishna Prasad as managing director. The newspaper's first chief editor was A. B. K. Prasad, who served until 1985, followed by notable figures such as K. N. Y. Patanjali and Potturi Venkateswara Rao. Despite its early success, Udayam faced financial challenges that led to its transfer of ownership to businessman and politician Magunta Subbarama Reddy in the early 1990s. Plans for expansion were hindered by economic constraints, and by 1995, declining circulation and mounting debts forced the newspaper to cease operations. Attempts to revive the newspaper in subsequent years, including initiatives led by Dasari Narayana Rao himself, were unsuccessful.

Udayam is remembered for its editorial independence, inclusive work culture, and contribution to Telugu journalism. The newspaper was known for its investigative reporting, advocacy for social justice, and efforts to highlight the rights of marginalized communities and expose corruption.

== History ==
=== Launch and early success ===
In addition to his career in cinema, Dasari Narayana Rao was known for his engagement with political and social causes, which inspired him to establish Udayam as a platform to express his ideals. Prior to its launch, Dasari Narayana Rao announced the start date of Udayam through advertisements in newspapers like Andhra Jyoti two weeks before 29 December 1984. In the ad, he mentioned that the launch would occur after the 1984 Lok Sabha elections to avoid interfering with the electoral process.

Udayam was launched in Hyderabad and Vijayawada on 29 December 1984 under the editorship of A. B. K. Prasad, a respected journalist, and quickly gained significant traction. Within a month, the newspaper's circulation reached 2,24,000 copies, making it the second-most circulated newspaper in Andhra Pradesh at the time pushing Andhra Prabha to third position. Due to the high demand, publisher Dasari Narayana Rao reportedly ordered additional printing machines to meet the needs of vendors requesting 50,000 more copies, even halting an ongoing sales campaign to manage the situation. By 1987, Andhra Jyothi pushed Udayam to the third position.

Udayam was distinct in its editorial stance, advocating for marginalized and underrepresented communities while focusing on anti-corruption and pro-democratic narratives. The newspaper became a leading voice for leftist and progressive ideas, often highlighting social justice issues and championing the rights of disadvantaged groups. Its commitment to these causes helped it earn a loyal readership among diverse social segments in Andhra Pradesh.

=== Ownership change and closure ===
Financial difficulties eventually led Dasari Narayana Rao to transfer ownership of Udayam to Magunta Subbarami Reddy, a liquor baron and member of parliament (MP). In 1994, Subbarami Reddy announced ambitious plans to expand Udayam to 10 editions across Andhra Pradesh and to revive the historic Telugu daily Andhra Patrika, which had ceased publication in 1991. He also acquired properties for the new editions.

However, these expansion plans were soon complicated by the imposition of alcohol prohibition in Andhra Pradesh, which severely impacted Subbarami Reddy's primary revenue source from his liquor businesses. By 1995, Udayam’s circulation had declined significantly, falling to around 50,000 copies from its initial success. The newspaper struggled with substantial monthly losses of ₹32 lakh, accumulating a total debt of ₹15 crore, while declining advertising revenue further strained its finances.

The rising costs of newsprint over the preceding 15 months compounded Udayam’s financial woes. Subbarami Reddy's investments in advanced printing technology and plans for an English-language newspaper added to the company's expenses, ultimately leading to the closure of Udayam on 23 May 1995, after nearly 11 years of publication.

=== Attempted revival ===
Following its closure, efforts were made to revive Udayam under new management. Sathya Sai Prasad of Rayalaseema Paper Mills led these efforts, proposing a new editorial team with C. Ramachandraiah as Chief Editor, Nanduri Ramamohan Rao as advisory editor, and K. Ramachandra Murthy as Editor. However, the revival attempts lasted for about a year before operations ceased again. Later, Dasari Narayana Rao, the publication's founder, reportedly made efforts to relaunch Udayam, but it ultimately remained closed.

In 2017, it was reported that TV5, a leading Telugu news channel, was planning to relaunch Udayam as a vernacular newspaper. Although there were initial concerns about using the same name, these issues were eventually said to be resolved. Despite its closure, the Udayam name remained iconic, and TV5's decision to revive it sparked interest in the media industry.

== Editorial team ==
The editorial team consisted of respected journalists and writers, including A. B. K. Prasad, K. N. Y. Pathanjali, K. Ramachandra Murthy, Pasam Yadagiri, Devi Priya, Sajjala Ramakrishna Reddy, Devulapalli Amar, and Rapolu Ananda Bhaskar. The team represented a diversity of political ideologies, ranging from left-wing to Congress, socialism, and the RSS. Despite ideological differences, the team maintained a professional environment where ideas could be discussed openly and respectfully.

== Work culture ==
Udayam was established by Dasari Narayana Rao with an emphasis on editorial independence and a collaborative workplace culture. He encouraged open dialogue and creative thinking across all levels of the newspaper's operations. Ramakrishna Prasad, a close associate of Dasari Narayana Rao and the grandson of freedom fighter Gottipati Brahmayya, provided additional support in management. The workplace at Udayam was known for its inclusivity, with employees from various departments, including circulation and marketing, participating in editorial discussions. This collaborative culture fostered a sense of shared responsibility and enthusiasm for the newspaper's mission.

== Legacy ==
Udayam achieved significant readership in its initial years, with a circulation of around 2,24,000 copies. It was recognized for its investigative journalism, frequently publishing reports that exposed societal issues such as corruption and illegal activities. The newspaper also introduced innovative features, including a Hyderabad-specific tabloid format and Diksuchi, a supplement aimed at students, both of which gained popularity.

Even after its closure, Udayam remained influential in Telugu journalism, remembered for its commitment to editorial freedom and diverse thought. Nearly three decades after the newspaper's end, former employees and readers gathered in 2023 to commemorate its impact and the unique work environment it provided.
