= Alamanda =

Alamanda may refer to:

- Alamanda, Orissa, a village in Orissa State, India
- Alamanda, Vizianagaram district, a village in Andhra Pradesh, India
- Alamanda de Castelnau (born c. 1160), trobairitz
- Alamanda Motuga (born 1994), Samoan rugby union player

== See also ==
- Alamada, Philippines
- Allamanda, a genus of flowering plants
