= Devulapalli =

Devulapalli (Telugu: దేవులపల్లి) is a Telugu surname, it may refer to:

== People ==
- Devulapalli Krishnasastri (1887–1980), Telugu poet
- Devulapalli Amar (born 1957), Indian journalist

== Other uses ==
- Devulapalli Village (Devulapalle), West Godavari district, Andhra Pradesh
