= 2023 Andhra Pradesh train collision =

Railway accident in Vizianagaram district, India

Details
- Date: 29 October 2023
- Location: Vizianagaram district, Andhra Pradesh
- Country: India
- Line: Howrah–Chennai main line
- Operator: Indian Railways
- Incident type: Signal passed at danger
- Cause: Human error

Statistics
- Trains: 2
- Deaths: 14
- Injured: 30

On 29 October 2023, two passenger trains collided in southern India's Vizianagaram district in Andhra Pradesh state killing at least 14 people and leaving about 60 others injured. Three carriages of a stationary passenger train were derailed after it was hit by another train.

On 2 March 2024, Railway Minister Ashwini Vaishnaw claimed that the driver and the assistant driver of one of the two passenger trains that collided were watching a cricket match on the phone. No evidence was found after the analysis of mobile data usage of the loco pilots.

== Incident ==
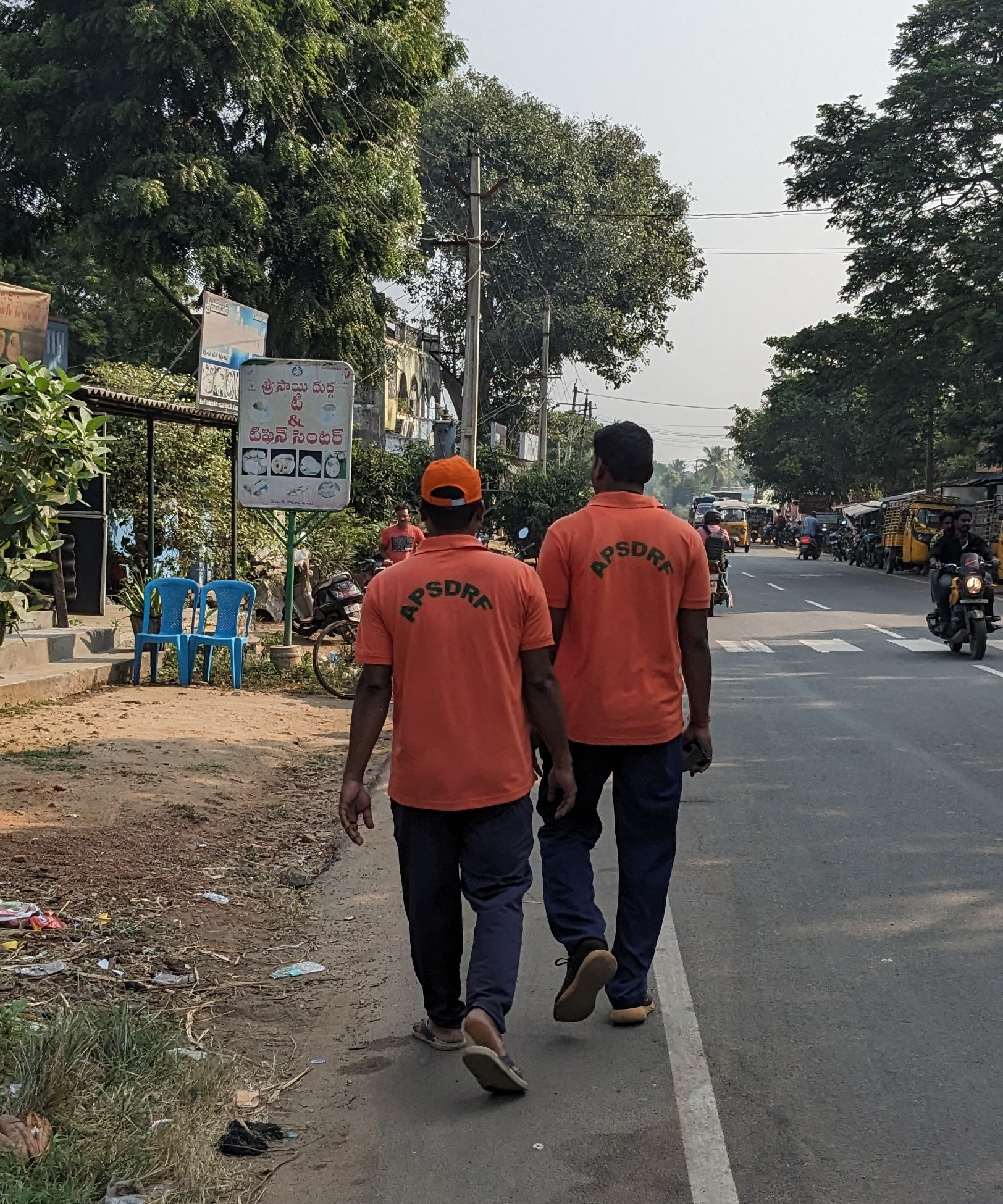
APSDRF Team at the collision site

On 29 October 2023, around 7:00 pm (13:30 UTC), the collision occurred on the Howrah–Chennai main line after Visakhapatnam-Palasa Express service train stopped due to a break in an overhead cable when it was hit by an oncoming passenger train travelling from Visakhapatnam in Andhra Pradesh, to Rayagada in Odisha, derailing its three carriages, in the Vizianagaram district of Andhra Pradesh, India. The collision occurred between Kantakapalli and Alamanda railway stations resulting in severe damage to three coaches of the Palasa passenger, and the locomotive and two coaches of the Rayagada passenger. At least 14 people were killed and 50 others were injured as a result.

== Response ==
The National Disaster Response Force team, State Disaster Response and Fire Services Department, police and railway personnel were engaged in the rescue operation. Heavy duty cranes were deployed at the site for the removal of the wrecked coaches.

According to Biswajit Sahu, Chief Public Relations Officer of East Coast Railway, a "human error" caused by "overshooting of signal" by the second train led to the collision. A preliminary probe by Indian Railways into the incident determined that the Rayagada passenger train passed two defective auto signals violating norms and held its driver and the assistant driver responsible for the collision. Both crew members were among those killed.

Following the crash, 33 trains were cancelled and 22 others were diverted. Later, the railway track was restored within a span of 20 hours, allowing the train services to resume.

The Prime Minister's Office announced an ex gratia of ₹2 lakh for the next of kin of each of the deceased and ₹50,000 to each of the injured from the Prime Minister's National Relief Fund.
