= K. N. Y. Patanjali =

Indian writer, journalist, novelist (1952–2009)

Patanjali
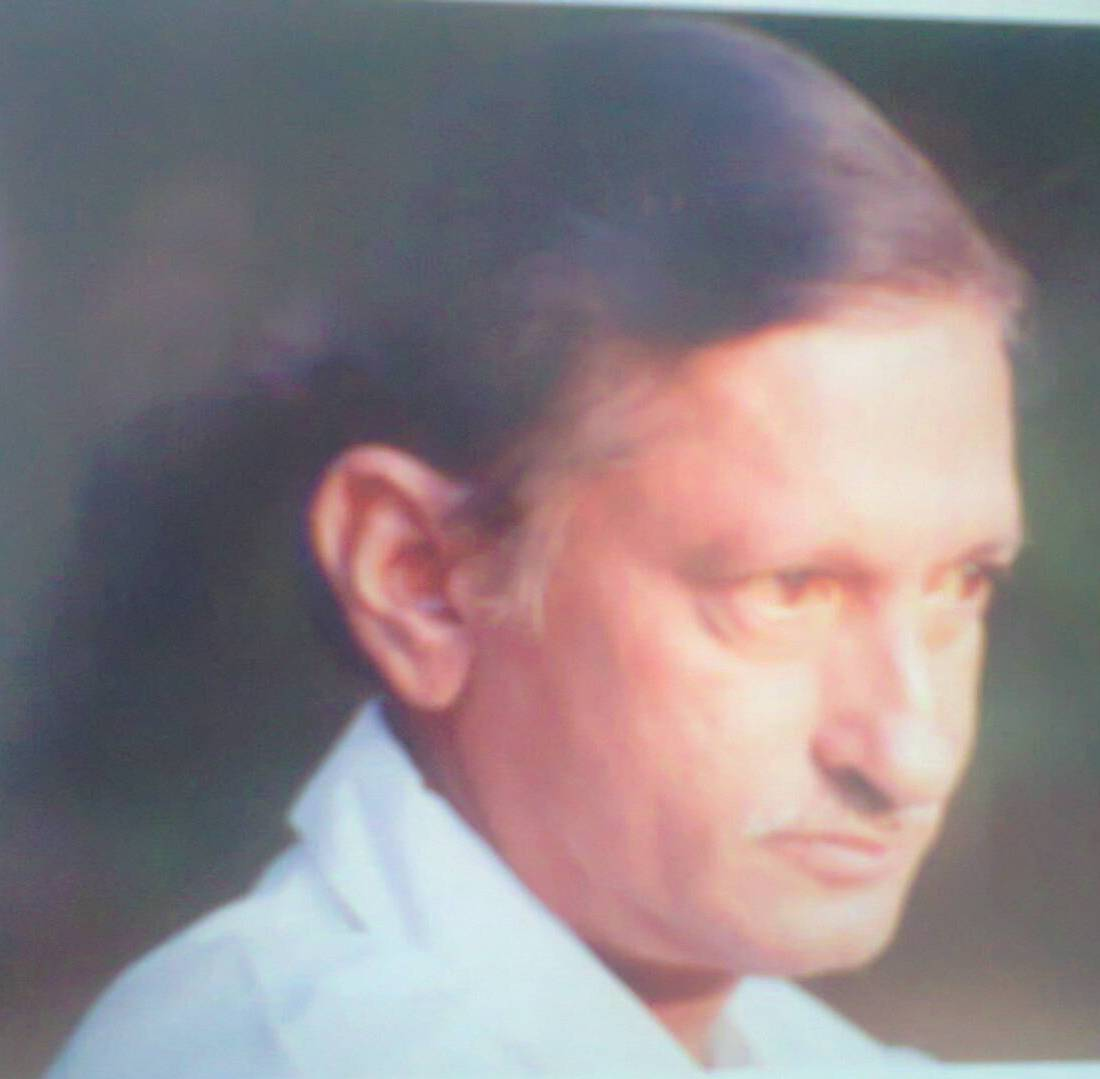
- Born: Kakarlapudi Narasimha Yoga Patanjali; 29 March 1952; Alamanda, Vizianagaram, Andhra Pradesh, India
- Died: 11 March 2009 (aged 56); Visakhapatnam, Andhra Pradesh, India
- Occupations: Journalist, writer, novelist
- Spouse: Prameela
- Children: Shanti, Neelima, Shalini
- Awards: Nandi Award for Best Dialogue Writer

K. N. Y. Patanjali was a noted writer, journalist from Andhra Pradesh. He worked in various news papers like Eenadu, Andhra Bhoomi, Udayam and Andhra Prabha. He was also the editor of Sakshi news paper. He wrote many novels and short stories. Most of his writings has his own style of satire. He died on 11 March 2009 in Visakhapatnam.

== Personal life ==
Patanjali was born on 29 March 1952 in Alamanda of Vizianagaram district of Andhra Pradesh to the couple K. V. V. Gopala Raju and Seeta Devi. While pursuing his elementary education, he also learnt Ayurveda from his father. He started writing from young age.

== Journalist ==
He joined Eenadu news paper as a journalist in 1975 in worked there till 1984. From 1984 to 1990, he worked for Udayam news paper. Later he also worked for Andhra Bhoomi, and Mahanagar. He started his own news paper Patanjali Patrika and ran it for 16 months. Then he joined Andhra Prabha in 2003. He worked with TV9 for a few months before taking over as an editor of Sakshi. He fell ill after some time. He died on 11 March 2009 in Visakhapatnam in a private hospital.

== Writer ==
He was inspired by the writings of Raavi Sastry. Pempudu Jantuvu (Pets) is based on the lives of journalists. Khaki Vanam (Brown garden) is based on the lives of the Police.

== Writings ==
- Amrutopamanam
- Khaki Vanam
- Pempudu Jantuvulu
- Rajugoru
- Veera Bobbili
- Gopatrudu
- Pilaka Tirugudu Puvvu
- Raju Gari Logillu
- Patanjali Bhashyam

MaNaSu Foundation published his complete works in two volumes.

== Awards ==
- Nandi Award for Best Dialogue Writer - Sindhooram (1997)
