= Devendran =

Indian film music director

- Born: Vadakarai, Srivilliputhur, Tamil Nadu, India
- Other name: Ravi Devendran
- Occupation: Music composer
- Years active: 1986–present

Devendran, also known as Ravi Devendran, is an Indian music composer who works in Tamil-language films. He is known for the melodious composition of chartbuster "Kannukkul Nooru Nilava" from the Bharathiraja directed film Vedham Pudhithu released in 1987.

== Early life ==
Devendran was born and raised in Vadakarai. He studied Carnatic, Hindustani and Western music.

== Career ==
Devendran began his career as a music teacher at a Tiruvottiyur school. Once when director R. Sundarrajan came as the chief guest for an event there, he was impressed with a song performed by the students, which was composed by Devendran, and announced at the event that he would be the composer of his next directorial. However, since the project was dropped, producer Kovaithambi hired Devendran to debut in film with Mannukkul Vairam. The film's song "Pongiyathe Kadhal" was based on the school composition that Sundarrajan appreciated. Devendran later composed the music for Bharathiraja's Vedham Pudhithu, where the song "Kannukkul Nooru Nilava" attained popularity. In the following 30 years, he composed for less than 20 films and Bharathiraja bemoaned that Devendran, despite his extensive musical knowledge, did not attain the success or popularity he deserved.

== Partial filmography ==
Films

Year	Movie title	Notes
1986	Mannukkul Vairam	
1987	Vedham Pudhithu	
1987	Aankalai Nambathey	
1987	Ore Raththam	
1988	Ganam Courtar Avargale	
1988	Kaalaiyum Neeye Maalaiyum Neeye	
1988	Melangottu Thalikattu	
1988	Uzhaithu Vaazha Vendum	
1989	Nee Vandhal Vasantham	
1991	Naan Pogum Paadhai	
1991	Prarthana	Telugu film
1992	Chinna Chittu	
1992	Raguluthunna Bharatham	Telugu film
1993	Pudhiya Thendral	
1993	Prema Pusthakam	Telugu film
1994	Mudhal Payanam	
1996	Meendum Savithri	
1996	Vaikarai Pookkal	
2000	Unakkaga Mattum	Score only
2009	Munnar	
2011	Paavi	
2012	Naanum En Jamunavum	
2014	Balu Thambi Manasile	
2018	Kadal Kuthiraigal	
2020	Pachai Vilakku	

Serials

- Roja (2003) (Jaya TV)
- Thekkathi Ponnu (2008) (Kalaignar TV) (Background score only)
