= Raguluthunna Bharatham =

- Movie Poster
- Directed by: Allani Sridhar
- Written by: Challa Subrahmanyam; Allani Sridhar (dialogues)
- Screenplay by: Allani Sridhar
- Story by: Challa Subrahmanyam
- Produced by: Challa Subrahmanyam
- Starring: Akkineni Nageswara Rao; Jagapathi Babu; Divyavani; Dasari Narayana Rao
- Cinematography: Chota K. Naidu
- Edited by: K. Ravindra Babu
- Music by: Devendran
- Production company: Maitra Creations
- Release date: 20 February 1992
- Running time: 124 mins
- Country: India
- Language: Telugu

Raguluthunna Bharatham (transl. Burning India) is a 1992 Telugu-language action film, produced by Challa Subrahmanyam under the Maitra Creations banner and directed by Allani Sridhar. It stars Akkineni Nageswara Rao, Jagapathi Babu, Divyavani and music composed by Devendran with the cinematography handeled by Chota K. Naidu.

== Plot ==
The film begins in 1947 Andaman Jail when 3 prisoners, Raghupati, Raghava, and Rajaram, succeed in escaping and split. During that chaos, Raghupati, a true patriot, goes into a coma and recoups after 45 years. Presently, Raghava Rao reached the top as Chief minister who sovereignties the anarchy and monarchy with the aid of his bloodthirsty son Tilak. Meanwhile, Raghupati steps foot in to view independent India. CM gives him a warm welcome and hospitalizes him. Meanwhile, Tilak stabs a journalist, exposes their barbarities, and is rescued by a stout-hearted cop, Inspector Pratap, who joins him in the same hospital. So, malefactors’ ruse a bomb blast. Fortuitously, Raghupati gets a call from his other mate, Rajaram, who turns into a Naxalite and continues his charge against prevailing violations. Anyhow, he calms down and unmasks the state of play to Raghupati until he self-learns.

After that, while absconding from the goons, Swetha, a reporter, seeks Raghupati's help, and he walks with her. Currently, the bomb explodes, and Raghupati is declared dead. The day after, Raghupati hits the news and decides to hide to discolor the status quo. Swetha is a single parent with her son Vicky, and Raghupati accompanies them. Plus, he discovers Pratap & Swetha are a divorced couple who have been split due to ego, and Raghupati reunites them. Parallelly, he is associated with Taxi Babai, a man of sociability who always commits, criticizes, and condemns the totalitarian government. Alongside, Tilak entraps and evades his daughter Bharati when he forcibly knits them. Forthwith, Tilak slays Bharati and engenders it as an accident.

Later, step by step, Raghupati spots the contrast between virtual & reality and revolts against malefactors. Hence, they label him insane and tortured when Rajaram frees him by abducting Tilak. At that point, the 3 ex-mates get together, and one requests the remaining to move in their path, but in vain. Currently, Raghupati has formed a non-violent anti-government movement called Jaathisena. Accordingly, to demolish it, Tilak slaughters Taxi Babai when Pratap apprehends him. Nevertheless, authority bodies declare him as non-guilty. So, devastated, Pratap resigns and joins Jaathisena. Soon, Raghupati awakes the social conscience that ignites the country and dethrones Raghava Rao. Thus, the devil complots to assassinate Raghupati with mass murder. At last, Raghupati is shot dead when the enraged public onslaughts and ceases the baddies. Finally, the movie ends with Pratap, Swetha & their son progressing in Raghupati's mission.

== Cast ==
- Akkineni Nageswara Rao as Raghupathi
- Jagapathi Babu as Inspector Pratap
- Divyavani as Swetha
- Dasari Narayana Rao as Taxi Babai
- Gollapudi Maruthi Rao as CM Raghava Rao
- Tanikella Bharani
- Dharmavarapu Subramanyam
- Pokuri Babu Rao as Tilak
- Kota Shankar Rao as Rajaram
- Sridevi as Bharati
- Y. Vijaya
- Baby Sunayana as Vicky

== Soundtrack ==
Raguluthunna Bharatham

Soundtrack album by Devendran
- Released: 1992
- Genre: Soundtrack
- Length: 21:23
- Label: Surya Music
- Producer: Devendran

Devendran chronology
Prarthana (1991)	Raguluthunna Bharatham (1992)	Prema Pusthakam (1993)

Music composed by Devendran. Lyrics written by Devi Priya. Music released by the Lahari Music Company.

No.	Title	Singer(s)	Length
1.	"Guruthunda Neeku"	S. P. Balasubrahmanyam, S. Janaki	4:06
2.	"Mukkalaina Swapnam"	S. Janaki	4:25
3.	"Juffku Jamma"	S. P. Balasubrahmanyam	4:02
4.	"Savalunte Jawabundhi"	S. P. Balasubrahmanyam & Chorus	4:50
5.	"Idi Nishantha Swatantram"	S. P. Balasubrahmanyam, K. S. Chithra, & Chorus	4:00
Total length:			21:23
