= Ganam Courtar Avargale =

1988 film directed by Manivannan

- Theatrical release poster
- Directed by: Manivannan
- Written by: Manivannan
- Produced by: Sengamalam Manivannan
- Starring: Sathyaraj; Ambika
- Cinematography: A. Sabapathy
- Edited by: Gowthaman
- Music by: Devendran
- Production company: Kamala Jothi Combines
- Release date: 20 May 1988
- Running time: 117 minutes
- Country: India
- Language: Tamil

Ganam Courtar Avargale (transl. Your honour) is a 1988 Indian Tamil-language comedy thriller film written and directed by Manivannan. The film stars Sathyaraj and Ambika. It was released on 20 May 1988.

== Plot ==
Jayabhaskar "Bhaski", an aspiring lawyer, works under veteran lawyer Desikachari as an assistant and becomes close to his family. Things change when Desikachari becomes involved in a murder case.

== Cast ==
- Sathyaraj as Jayabhaskar ("Baski")
- Ambika as Seetha
- S. S. Chandran as Desikachari
- Srividya as Pankajam ("Paki")
- Silk Smitha as Nirosha
- Janagaraj as Baski's mentor
- Captain Raju as Badesa
- Pratap Pothen
- Chandrasekhar as Nirosha's brother

== Production ==
Ganam Courtar Avargale was written and directed by Manivannan, and produced by his wife Sengamalam under Kamala Jothi Combines. Cinematography was handled by A. Sabapathy, and editing by A. Gowthaman. While filming a court scene, Sathyaraj played 13 different roles, taking inspiration from Sivaji Ganesan playing nine roles in Navarathri (1964). The final length of the film was 3,929.21 metres (12,891.1 ft).

== Soundtrack ==
The soundtrack was composed by Devendran. The song "Yaaritta Sattam" has an instrumental version, with R. Chandrasekar playing the guitar.

Track listing
No.	Title	Lyrics	Singer(s)	Length
1.	"Patta Patippu"	Vairamuthu	S. P. Balasubrahmanyam, Chorus	5:51
2.	"Motta"	Vairamuthu	K. S. Chithra	4:25
3.	"Yaaritta Sattam"	Vairamuthu	Malaysia Vasudevan	4:11
4.	"Kadal Kavidai"	Vairamuthu	S. P. Balasubrahmanyam, K. S. Chithra	4:48
5.	"Aasaikku Pooja"	Jevabharathi	S. P. Balasubrahmanyam, K. S. Chithra	4:17
6.	"Yaaritta Sattam" (Instrumental)	—	—	4:10
Total length:				27:42

== Release and reception ==
Ganam Courtar Avargale was released on 20 May 1988. N. Krishnaswamy of The Indian Express positively reviewed the film for Manivannan's "stylish" direction and Sathyaraj's performance. Jayamanmadhan of Kalki felt that, post-interval, the screenplay could have been a little smarter. The film was commercially successful.
