= Andhra Pradesh State Disaster Response and Fire Services Department =

Agency in Andhra Pradesh, India

Operational area
- Country: Andhra Pradesh, India

Agency overview
- Established: 1 November 1956
- Fire chief: N. Sambasiva Rao
- EMS level: BLS
- Motto: We Serve to Save

Facilities and equipment
- Stations: 252

Website
- http://fireservices.ap.gov.in

The Andhra Pradesh State Disaster Response and Fire Services Department is the agency responsible for fire protection and disaster management in the Indian state of Andhra Pradesh.

The department issues No Objection Certificates for buildings that adhere to fire safety norms. The department also has the right to penalise violators of fire safety norms.

In 2013, the department announced an initiative to improve efficiency by equipping fire engines with GPS devices and cameras to help track locations of fire.

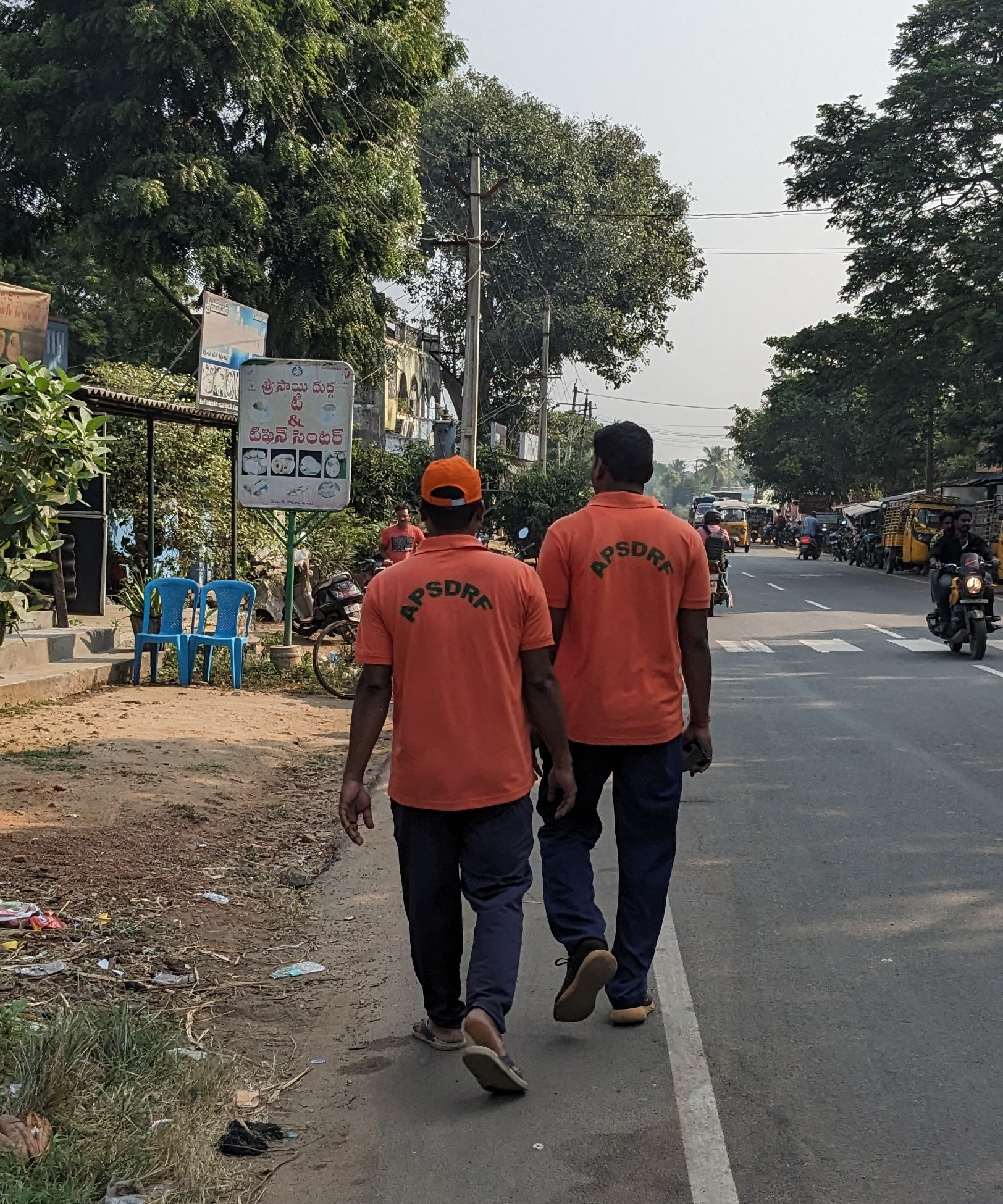
APSDRF Personnel at 2023 Andhra Pradesh train collision site.

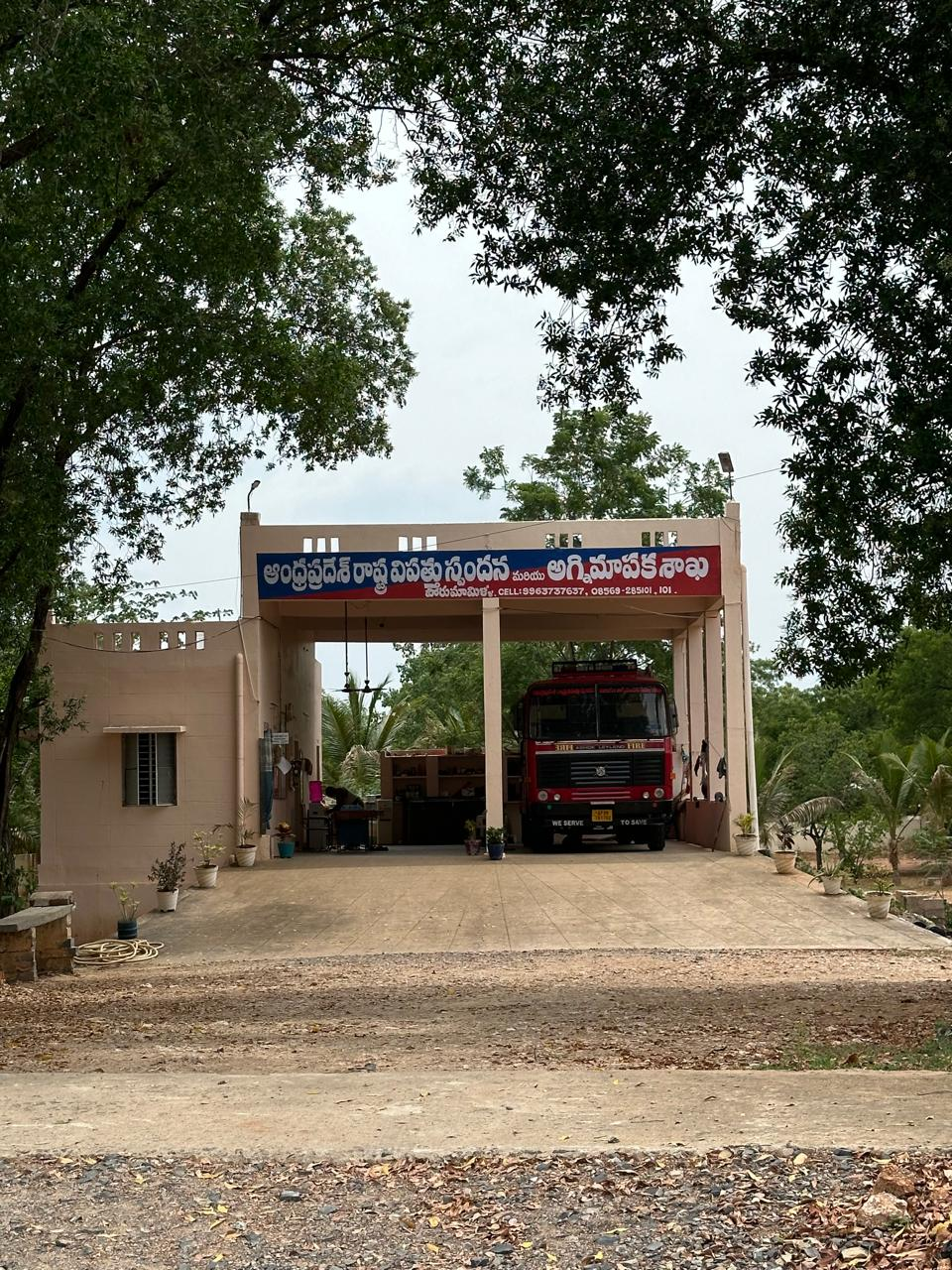
Fire Station in Porumamilla

The department had 265 fire stations in 2014 prior to bifurcation of the state. Post bifurcation, 173 are located in Andhra Pradesh, while the remaining are located in Telangana.
