= Amaanat (1994 film) =

1994 film by Raj Sippy

- Release poster
- Directed by: Raj N. Sippy
- Written by: Sachin Bhowmick
- Produced by: Romu N. Sippy
- Starring: Sanjay Dutt; Akshay Kumar; Heera Rajagopal; Kanchan
- Cinematography: S. Pappu
- Edited by: Ashok Honda
- Music by: Bappi Lahiri
- Release date: 14 October 1994
- Country: India
- Language: Hindi
- Budget: ₹2.85 crore
- Box office: ₹5.48 crore

Amaanat is a 1994 Indian Hindi-language action film directed by Raj N. Sippy. A remake of the 1989 Bengali film of the same name, it stars Sanjay Dutt, Akshay Kumar, Heera Rajagopal and Kanchan in pivotal roles.

== Plot summary ==
In a small village having mostly aged people, there has not been any rainfall for the past three years. A youngster wanting to be the leader of the village has to free the village people from this calamity. The people of the village beg a rich master for water, but in vain. So the hero has to go to the city to buy a water tube. In the city, all his belongings including his money have been stolen. Then he rescues a guy who was getting beaten up by thieves. They become good friends and they help each other, later it's found out that the guy he saved is the one who actually stole his money but later when he

== Cast ==
- Sanjay Dutt as Vijay
- Akshay Kumar as Amar
- Heera Rajagopal as Geeta
- Kanchan as Radha
- Farheen as Bijli
- Mukesh Khanna as Agarwal Seth
- Gulshan Grover as Niranjan
- Kiran Kumar as Rajeshwar / Lankeshwar
- Navneet Nishan as Yasmin
- Neelam Mehra as Neelam

== Soundtrack ==
#	Title	Singer(s)
1	"Tumse Milna Milkar Chalna"	Kumar Sanu, Alka Yagnik
2	"Din Mein Kehti Hai"	Kumar Sanu, Alka Yagnik, Ila Arun
3	"Daloonga Daloonga Pyar Se Main Daloonga"	Kumar Sanu, Alka Yagnik
4	"Gori Gori Gori Change Kar"	Kumar Sanu
5	"Din Mein Leti Hai"	Kumar Sanu, Alka Yagnik, Ila Arun
6	"Is Duniya Mein Jo Bhi Hota Hai"	Kumar Sanu
7	"Allah Megh De Ishwar Paani De"	Bappi Lahiri
8	"Din Mein Leti Hai" (Female)	Alka Yagnik, Ila Arun
9	"Laa Doonga Laa Doonga"	Babul Supriyo, Alka Yagnik
10	"Ye Duniya Kya Mange Money Money"	Arun Bakshi
