= Un Kannil Neer Vazhinthal... =

1985 film by Balu Mahendra

- Poster
- Directed by: Balu Mahendra
- Screenplay by: Balu Mahendra
- Story by: Akhila Mahendra
- Produced by: P. R. Govindaraj; J. Duraisamy
- Starring: Rajinikanth; Madhavi
- Cinematography: Balu Mahendra
- Edited by: D. Vasu
- Music by: Ilaiyaraaja
- Production company: Kalakendra Movies
- Release date: 20 June 1985
- Running time: 130 minutes
- Country: India
- Language: Tamil

Un Kannil Neer Vazhinthal... (transl. If tears well up in your eyes) is a 1985 Indian Tamil-language action film written and directed by Balu Mahendra. It stars Rajinikanth and Madhavi, with Y. G. Mahendran in a prominent role. V. K. Ramasamy and Senthamarai play other pivotal roles. The film, released on 20 June 1985, was not a box office success.

== Plot ==
Dharmaraj sets up false charges against Ravi, an honest policeman, which leads to Ravi’s suspension. Disappointed by this, he tries to unmask Dharmaraj and prove his own innocence.

== Cast ==
- Rajinikanth as Ravi
- Madhavi as Padma
- Y. G. Mahendran as Babu
- Senthamarai as Dharmaraj
- V. K. Ramasamy as Perumal
- Vennira Aadai Moorthy
- Menon as Jagathy
- Master Haja Sheriff
- Poornam Viswanathan as Viswanath
- Oru Viral Krishna Rao as Munusami
- Sangeeta as Durga
- Mounika as Viswanath's daughter

== Production ==
Mounika made her feature film debut in this film. It is the only time Rajinikanth acted under Balu Mahendra's direction. The film was largely shot in Ooty. It is one of the few films directed by Mahendra to be outright "mainstream", alongside Neengal Kettavai (1984).

== Soundtrack ==
The soundtrack was composed by Ilaiyaraaja.

Song	Singers	Lyrics	Length
"Enna Desamo"	K. J. Yesudas	Vairamuthu	04:41
"Ilamai Itho"	Malaysia Vasudevan	Gangai Amaran	04:21
"Kannil Enna"	S. P. Balasubrahmanyam, S. Janaki	Vairamuthu	04:39
"Malare Malare"	S. Janaki	Mu. Metha	04:16
"Moonu Vela Soru"	S. Janaki	Mu. Metha	04:46
"Nethu Varai"	Mano, S. Janaki	Gangai Amaran	04:37

== Reception ==
Jayamanmadhan of Kalki said the film, despite numerous flaws, could be watched for its outdoor photography.
