= Pachai Vilakku (2020 film) =

2020 Indian Tamil-language film

- Theatrical release poster
- Directed by: Dr Maran
- Written by: Dr Maran
- Produced by: Dr C Manimekalai B.sc, MBBS
- Starring: Maran; Dheesha
- Cinematography: S. V. Balaji
- Edited by: Suresh Urs
- Music by: Devendran
- Production company: Digithink Media Works
- Release date: 3 January 2020
- Running time: 141 minutes
- Country: India
- Language: Tamil

Pachai Vilakku (transl. Green Signal) is a 2020 Indian Tamil-language film directed by Maran. The film stars Maran and Dheesha, in the lead roles with Imman Annachi and Tara in supporting roles. Kannada actress Roopika makes her Tamil debut with this film.

== Cast ==
- Maran as Ashwin Kumar
- Dheesha as Subhasini
- Imman Annachi as Sub-Inspector Vijay
- Tara as Vaishnavi
- Roopika as a ghost
- Sri Mahesh as Rajasekar alias Robert
- Manobala as Professor
- Poster Nandakumar as Periyavar
- K. Sivasankar as Professor
- Nellai Siva as Police inspector
- Nanjil Vijayan

== Production ==
The film was shot in Chennai, National Highway 45, Thiruporur, and Tiruvanamalai.

== Soundtrack ==
Devendran composed four songs for the film.

== Reception ==
Deccan Chronicle wrote that "As a director, he [Maran] has extracted the best, be it from Dheesha, Tara and other newcomers. Imman Annachi performs well. But as an actor, Maran needs to hone his skills. The screenplay gets a bit preachy at times; nevertheless, the intention to impart a good message is obvious".

== Awards and screenings ==
Pachai Vilakku won the 'Best Social Awareness Film' at Paro's Druk International Film Festival, 'Best Feature Film' at Florence Film Awards Italy and 'Best Film' at India's Tripvill International Film Festival.

The film was screened at the American Golden Picture International Film Festival, CKF International Film Festival, South Film and Arts Academy Festival, First Time Filmmaker Sessions, Frostbite International Indie Fest, Aphrodite Film Awards, and the New York Movie Awards in the year 2020.
