= Do Hanso Ka Joda =

Do Hanso Ka Joda दो हंसो का जोड़ा
- Film poster
- Directed by: Anup Malik
- Produced by: G.D. Talwar
- Starring: Anupam; Kanchan
- Music by: Dilip Sen-Sameer Sen
- Release date: 8 May 1992
- Country: India
- Language: Hindi

Do Hanso Ka Joda is a 1992 Bollywood film directed by Anup Malik.

== Cast ==
- Anupam Kher
- Kanchan
- Kiran Kumar
- Pran
- Reema Lagoo
- Beena Banarjee
- Sulbha Deshpande
- Mohan Kumar
- Ajit Vachanni

== Music ==
1. "Hum Aur Tum" – Sudesh Bhosle, Anupama Deshpande
2. "Dushman Dilo Ka Jala" – Kumar Sanu
3. "Tujh Bin Raha Na Jaye" – Mohammed Aziz
