= Gandharvam =

- Directed by: Sangeeth Sivan
- Screenplay by: Dennis Joseph
- Story by: Alex I. Kadavil; Sangeeth Sivan
- Produced by: Suresh Balaje
- Starring: Mohanlal; Kanchan
- Cinematography: Santosh Sivan
- Edited by: A. Sreekar Prasad
- Music by: S. P. Venkitesh
- Production company: Sithara Combines
- Distributed by: Pranavam Pictures
- Release date: 15 August 1993
- Running time: 158 minutes
- Country: India
- Language: Malayalam

Gandharvam is a 1993 Indian Malayalam-language romantic action thriller film directed by Sangeeth Sivan and written by Dennis Joseph from a story by Alex I. Kadavil and Sangeeth Sivan. It was produced by Suresh Balaje and stars Mohanlal and Kanchan (in her only Malayalam film) and Shankar, Jagathi Sreekumar, Vijayakumar, Devan, Prem Kumar and Kaviyoor Ponnamma appears in supporting roles. The music was composed by S. P. Venkitesh.

== Plot ==
Sam Alexander, a fun-loving automobile workshop owner is keener in scripting and directing theatrical plays than running his business. A theater addict, Sam, along with his friends, Pappu Mesthiri, Mammoonju, and Preman, is now working on Shakunthalam, the famous play by Kalidasa. Gracy Kutty, his mother, is worried about his easy-going and careless attitude towards life.

The main actress Komalam who was supposed to play the role of Shakunthala elopes with Krishnan Kutty, a fellow artist. Sam is busy searching for a new face to enact Shakunthala. Accidentally, he meets up with Sreedevi Menon, with whom he falls in love. He attempts all methods to woo her and finally, she falls in. But Sam on the other hand acts like he hates Sreedevi for a dirty game she used to make Sam look bad in front of his family. To comfort Sam, Sreedevi takes the role of Shakunthala without the knowledge of Sam and her family.

Sreedevi, daughter of Meledath Vishwanatha Menon, the rich businessman in the city, thus acts in the drama. Menon and his son (Sreedevi's brother) Vishnu Menon dislikes this relationship as he is from a Nair Hindu Menon family and Sam Alexander is a Syrian Christian. On the way home, Sam and Sreedevi are caught red-handed by Vishnu. Ravindran Nair, the IG and friend of Menon, had plans of getting his son Rajkumar married to Sreedevi, so that he could own up a huge part of the business empire. With the help of Ravindran Nair, Sam is beaten up by police.

Sam and Sreedevi elope and spend a few days away from the worries. In the meantime, the duo is again caught by Vishnu. Sam is arrested for kidnapping Sreedevi and is jailed for 10 months. At the jail, he learns that Sreedevi is pregnant with his child but has no way to save the kid. Upon knowing that Sreedevi is pregnant, she is transferred to a distant place. Once she gives birth to a baby boy, the attitude of Menon and Vishnu changes, and they started looking upon him as their heir.

Sensing danger, Ravindran Nair sends Rajkumar to kidnap and kill the boy. Vishnu realizes the plan of Rajkumar and tries to save his sister and the baby. In the meantime, Sam escapes from jail and reaches the house where Sreedevi stays. She attempts to commit suicide to escape from Rajkumar but is saved miraculously by Sam, who makes a dramatic entry. He defeats Rajkumar and saves the child. Menon and Vishnu happily unite Sam and Sreedevi. Sam happily goes back to jail after seeing Sreedevi and his child one more time.

== Cast ==
- Mohanlal as Samuel "Sam"
- Kanchan as Sreedevi Menon
- Vijayakumar as IG Ravindran Nair IPS
- Devan as Meleveetil Vishnu Menon
- Jagathi Sreekumar as Pappu Mesthiri
- Kaviyoor Ponnamma as Gracy Kutty
- Shanthi Krishna as Lakshmi
- Kalpana as Kottarakara Komalam
- Kunchan as Mammunju
- Prem Kumar as Preman
- Mukesh Rishi as Rangan
- Shankar as Chandran
- Subair as CI Santhosh
- Paravoor Bharathan
- Sukumari
- Geetha Vijayan as Sony
- Nishal Chandra
- Hari as Advocate Ajayan
- Aboobacker as Abdul Salim
- Mohan Jose as prisoner
- Nandu
- Krishnankutty Nair as K. K. Kottarakara
- Kazan Khan as Rajkumar
- Antony Perumbavoor as Bike racer

== Trivia ==
- Gandharvam was produced by Suresh Balaji, the brother-in-law of Mohanlal.
- Makers tried to rope in Manisha Koirala for the lead role, but for reasons unknown Manisha couldn’t commit to the film. Several other heroines were considered such as Divya Bharati, Ramya Krishnan, Meena, and Nagma. But later Kanchan was finalized. This is the only Malayalam film in her career.
- Popular Tamil actor Vijayakumar also made his debut in Malayalam with Gandharvam.

== Soundtrack ==
The film features original soundtrack composed by S. P. Venkatesh for the lyrics by Kaithapram Damodaran. Released by T-Series (company).

No.	Title	Singer(s)	Length
1.	"Nenjil Kanjabaanam"	S. P. Balasubrahmanyam	4:40
2.	"Oomale Nin Mugham"	K. J. Yesudas	3:58
3.	"Pranayatharangam"	K. J. Yesudas, K. S. Chithra	4:18
4.	"Aathire Nin Mugham"	K. S. Chithra	3:57
5.	"Maliniyude Theerangal"	M. G. Sreekumar, Sujatha Mohan	4:22
6.	"Abalathvamalla"	Mohanlal	4:49
