= Meendum Oru Mariyathai =

Film directed by Bharathiraja

- Theatrical release poster
- Directed by: Bharathirajaa
- Written by: Bharathirajaa
- Produced by: Chandraleela Bharathiraja; Manoj Bharathiraja; Janani Rajkumar
- Starring: Bharathirajaa; Rasi Nakshatra; Mounika
- Cinematography: Salai Sagadevan
- Edited by: K. Pazhanivel
- Music by: Songs: N. R. Raghunanthan; Sharran Surya; Yuvan Shankar Raja; Score: Sabesh–Murali
- Production company: Manoj Creations
- Release dates: 2018 (South Asian Short Film Festival); 21 February 2020 (theatrical)
- Running time: 115 minutes
- Country: India
- Language: Tamil

Meendum Oru Mariyathai (transl. Once again a respect) is a 2018 Indian Tamil-language drama film written, produced and directed by Bharathirajaa. The film, starring himself, Rasi Nakshatra, and Mounika is bankrolled under his banner Manoj Creations. The majority of songs were composed by N. R. Raghunanthan and the score by Sabesh–Murali while cinematography was handled by Salai Sagadevan.

The film, which began production in 2014 under the title OM, premiered at the 2018 South Asian Short Film Festival, and had its theatrical release on 21 February 2020. It was Bharathirajaa's last feature film as director before his death in 2026

== Plot ==
In London, a young girl named Venba, struggling with personal issues and contemplating suicide, crosses paths with an old man, Om, who was abandoned by his son. As they embark on a transformative 10-day journey to exotic locations, Venba's family fears she has been kidnapped and is in grave danger. Unknown to them, Venba is not only safe but also gaining invaluable life lessons and forging a deep, unexpected bond with her elderly companion, which profoundly changes both their lives.

== Cast ==
- Bharathirajaa as Om
- Rasi Nakshatra as Venba
- Mounika as Meenakshi
- Joe Malloori as Man in old age home
- Jayandan as Rasapandi, Om's son
- Fenon J. Rodriguez as Venba's brother-in-law
- Shanmugasundar
- Raghupriya
- Sinthia Soosai as Venba's sister
- Baby Roshini Mugalipoo as Andrea
- Master Amokadiyavan
- Twinkle Jaiswal
- Master Ajay Dev Mahendran
- Kothandam Mugalipoo
- Lora
- Kavitha Bharathy
- Attur Annamalai
- Theni Muraliraj
- B. Gopi

== Production ==
It was announced in November 2014 that Bharathirajaa would portray the lead role in a film titled Om, directed by himself; at the time, one filming schedule had been completed. In July 2018, he revealed that the title was unrelated to Om, rather it was an acronym for "Old Man". The film's title was changed from OM to Meendum Oru Mariyathai in October 2019. The new title pays homage to Bharathirajaa's Muthal Mariyathai (1985). It was his final feature-length directorial credit before his death in 2026.

== Soundtrack ==
The soundtrack was primarily composed by N. R. Raghunanthan with Sharran Surya composing two songs and Yuvan Shankar Raja composing one song. It was released under the label Saregama.

Track listing
No.	Title	Lyrics	Music	Singer(s)	Length
1.	"Anbulla Kadhala"	Madhan Karky	N. R. Raghunanthan	Abhay Jodhpurkar, Alisha Thomas	3:20
2.	"Aasai Vechen"	Na. Muthukumar	N. R. Raghunanthan	Priya Himesh	3:48
3.	"Ilamayin Kaattil"	Na. Muthukumar	N. R. Raghunanthan	Sathyaprakash, Vaishali	4:23
4.	"Idhayathin Thirayilae"	Madhan Karky	N. R. Raghunanthan	Abhay Jodhpurkar, Alisha Thomas	1:09
5.	"Thoova Mazhai"			Vandana Srinivasan, Sarath Santhosh	4:45
6.	"Jananamum (Slogan)"	Vairamuthu	N. R. Raghunanthan	Madhu Balakrishnan, Parvathy	2:27
7.	"Kodi Kodiyai"	Na. Muthukumar	N. R. Raghunanthan	Vijay Yesudas, Vaishali	3:52
8.	"Baby"	Madhan Karky	N. R. Raghunanthan	Richard	1:58
9.	"Kozhundhan Peru"	Agathiyan	N. R. Raghunanthan	Velmurugan, Priya Himesh	3:48
10.	"Saattaiyin Munaiyil (Nee Seitha Neerodai)"	Kabilan Vairamuthu	Yuvan Shankar Raja	Priya Himesh, Sai Shravanam	4:18
11.	"Salamaley"	Sharran Surya	Sharran Surya	Divya Prasad	0:38
12.	"Silambam In The Club (Sutthum Indha Kamba)"	Sharran Surya	Sharran Surya	Sharran Surya, Divya Prasad	0:55
Total length:					35:31

== Release ==
The film, under its original title, premiered at the 2018 South Asian Short Film Festival, held in Ooty. It had its theatrical release under the revised title on 21 February 2020.

== Critical reception ==
Navein Darshan of The New Indian Express wrote, "Having grown up watching his films, I couldn't help but admire Bharathiraja's trademark touches [...] But, these weren't enough for me to feel connected to a film which shows a depressed, suicidal girl as a gleeful, ever-smiling damsel". Thinkal Menon of The Times of India wrote, "With an intriguing plot, what works for the film is the performance of both the lead artistes. But the below-par production quality and dramatic dialogues spoil the essence of several sequences". Ashutosh Mohan of Film Companion wrote, "For a film about two lost souls going on a journey together, we needed to see more things happen to them on their journey. We needed to see them change, know more about the kind of people they were to help us identify with them during the journey. But, we don't really get a concrete sense of their connection beyond what they tell each other".
