= Tathagatha Buddha (film) =

Tathagatha Buddha: The Life & Times of Gautama Buddha
- DVD cover
- Directed by: Allani Sridhar
- Written by: D. K. Goel; (Hindi dialogues)
- Based on: Gautam Buddha by Sadguru Sivananda Murty
- Produced by: K. Raja Sekhar; Radhakrishna
- Starring: Sunil Sharma; Kausha Rach; Suman; Puneet Issar; Surender Pal; Parvati Melton
- Cinematography: Madhu Mahankali
- Music by: Sashi Preetam
- Production company: Dharmapatha Creations
- Release date: 15 February 2008
- Running time: 135 minutes
- Country: India
- Languages: Hindi; Telugu

Tathagatha Buddha: The Life & Times of Gautama Buddha is a 2008 Indian feature film on the life and times of the Buddha directed by Allani Sridhar and is based upon the story by Sadguru Sivananda Murty. The film was simultaneously shot in Hindi and Telugu and released in 2008 alongside the English dubbed version The Path Finder. The film was viewed by the 14th Dalai Lama.

== Plot ==
The film tells the story of Siddhartha Gautama, Prince of Kapilavastu, situated in Nepal, who lived during 6th century B.C. He was born on Vaisakha Poornima. The history of his family, the Ikshvaku dynasty, is traceable to pre-Ramayana times. Renouncing the life and responsibility of a king, Siddhartha Gautama sought a solution to human misery. Ever in the midst of the great Indian religious and spiritual traditions, he noticed what was most needed by all people: Dharma, and non-violence. He sought a direct path to salvation. He was a lone pathfinder who inspired the religions that eventually spread to China, Japan, and to the United States and Europe as late as the 20th century.

== Cast ==
- Sunil Sharma as Buddha
- Surendra Pal as Śuddhodana
- Suman as Bimbisara
- Subbaraju as Ajatashatru
- Puneet Issar as Aṅgulimāla
- K. Raja Sekhar as Anathapindika
- Master Sivanand as Rahul
- Kausha Rach as Yashodhara
- Ashok Kumar as Prasenajit
- D. K. Goel as Devadatta
- Parvati Melton as Prerana
- Kausha Rach as Yaśodharā
- Sana as Mahāprajāpatī Gautamī
- Mansi as Mayadevi
- Sony Charista as Sujata
- Raja Sirivennela as Chenna
- Gaurav as Anand
- Rakesh as Sariputra
- Chander as Moudgalayana
- M. B. K. Prasad Rao as Bhavari
- Prudhvi Raj as Minister
- Kunal as Jethraj

== Production ==
The film was produced in two different languages: as Tadgatha Buddha in Hindi and as Gautama Buddha in Telugu. The film was also released in English as The Path Finder.

== Soundtrack ==
This film all music composed by Sashi Preetam and all lyrics by D. K. Goel in Hindi.

No.	Title	Singer(s)	Length
1.	"Raj Mahal"	Kumar Sanu	1:13
2.	"Preet Kiya"	Sadhana Sargam	4:34
3.	"Badhayi"	Krishna	1:34
4.	"Chod Ke Pinjara"	Sashi Preetam	1:42
5.	"Dharma Chakra"	Krishna	1:19
6.	"Priya Tum"	Alka Yagnik	2:41
7.	"Saawre"	Kavita Krishnamurthy	3:41
8.	"Tan Pinjar"	Sashi Preetam	2:28
Total length:			19:12

== See also ==
- Depictions of Gautama Buddha in film
- List of historical drama films of Asia
- Tathagatha Buddha

== Awards ==
- The film producer K. Raja Sekhar won for Nandi Special Jury Award.
