= MaNaSu Foundation =

Not for profit from India involved in archiving

Manasu Foundation
- Mannam Narasimham Subbamma Foundation
- మనసు ఫౌండేషన్
- Formation: 2006
- Founder: Mannam Venkata Rayudu
- Location: India
- Official language: Telugu
- Website: https://manasufoundation.com

MaNaSu (Mannam Narasimham Subbamma) Foundation is a non-profit organization established in 2006, focuses on the preservation and promotion of Telugu literature and culture through large-scale digitization, publication, and translation projects. It has undertaken extensive voluntary literary digitization efforts in India.

== History ==
MaNaSu Foundation was founded in 2006 in Bengaluru by Mannam Venkata Rayudu, an electronics engineer and entrepreneur, along with his brothers Dr. Gopi Chand Mannam, a cardiac surgeon and philanthropist, and Dr. Mannam Chandra Mouli, a journalist and book publisher. The organization's name is an acronym honoring the founders' parents, Mannam Narasimham and Subbamma.

== Activities ==
=== Digitization ===
Since its inception, MaNaSu Foundation has digitized over 1.3 lakh Telugu books, 70,000 magazines, and more than 2.5 crore pages, making these cultural resources freely accessible. In 2018, a dedicated digitization center was set up in Varikuntapadu, SPSR Nellore district, Andhra Pradesh, focusing on high-quality digitization and local skill development.

=== Publications ===
Complete works of Telugu authors:

- Rachakonda Viswanatha Sastry
- Kalipatnam Rama Rao
- SriSri
- Beenadevi
- Gurajada Appa Rao
- Patanjali
- Jashuva
- Sripada Subrahmanya Sastry

==== Translations and special publications ====
- While Sowing Sandals... Tales of a Telugu Pariah Tribe by Emma Rauschenbusch-Clough, a pioneering sociological study on the Madiga community, translated into Telugu
- The Biography of Sir Arthur Cotton by Lady Hope, translated by Kavana Sarma
- Patikella Telugu Katha (Twenty Five Years of Telugu Stories), anthology of selected Telugu stories from 1990 to 2015
