= Komaram Bheem (film) =

- Film poster
- Directed by: Allani Sridhar
- Screenplay by: Allani Sridhar
- Story by: SM Pran Rao
- Produced by: Aadhi Vasi Chitra Brundham
- Starring: Bhoopal Reddy; Mounika
- Cinematography: Bhavani Shankar
- Music by: Goutam Ghosh
- Production company: Filmmedia Productions
- Release date: 1990
- Country: India
- Language: Telugu

Komaram Bheem is a 1990 Indian Telugu-language biographical film directed by Allani Sridhar, It is based on the early 20th century tribal leader Komaram Bheem and stars Bhoopal Reddy as the titular character.

The film turned out to be a commercial as well as critical success. The film two Nandi Awards including Best Film on National Integration and Best First Film of a Director for Sridhar.

== Plot ==
The film follows the struggle of Gond Tribals the 1940s in Adilabad district against the oppressive rule of the Nizam. It focuses on the real life hero, Komaram Bheem, who led the resistance.

== Cast ==
- Bhoopal Reddy as Komaram Bheem
- Mounika as Som Bai, Komaram Bheem's wife
- Bank Prasad

== Production ==
Subramanyam, the director of the Integrated Tribal Development Agency (ITDA), encouraged Allani Sridhar to make a documentary on the tribals of Adilabad district, but Sridhar was more interested in making a film on Komaram Bheem.

== Release ==
The film was commercially released in July 2010, nearly 20 years of its production. The film ran for 100 days at a few locations Hyderabad.

== Awards ==
Nandi Awards – 1990

- Best Film on National Integration – Aadhi Vasi Chitra Brundham
- Best First Film of a Director – Allani Sridhar

== See also ==
- RRR (2022), a fictional film depicting Komaram Bheem and his contemporary Alluri Sitarama Raju
