= Bhoopal Reddy =

Indian writer and actor

M. Bhoopal Reddy
- Born: 1959 (age 66–67)
- Education: M.A. (Telugu), Ph.D
- Occupations: Writer, actor
- Writing career
- Language: Telugu
- Notable work: Uggu Paalu

M. Bhoopal Reddy (born 1959) is a Telugu language writer and actor. He won the 2011 Kendra Sahitya Akademi Awards for Children's Literature for his work, Uggu Paalu, a compilation of 90 children stories.

== Early life ==
Bhoopal Reddy was born in a humble farming family near Hyderabad. His father was a constable with the excise department. He had to work in their 2-acre grass field to make ends meet. He did his schooling at Amberpet Government school and Chaderghat high school. He did his intermediate and degree from New Science College and post graduation in Telugu from Osmania University. He obtained his doctorate on Potlapalli Rama Rao, a famous poet and story writer from Osmania University.

== Career ==
Bhoopal Reddy has written over 19 books. He also wrote Kotta Bag, Komaram Bheem, Gudugudu Gunchem and Vastava Potava were among the child literature and songs written by Reddy.

He was a stage artist and acted in movies like Komaram Bheem and Daasi.

== Awards ==
- Kendra Sahitya Akademi Awards for Children's Literature - Uggu Paalu - 2011. He returned the award in 2015 in protest against several sporadic events such as communal violence, attack on individuals who dared to speak against fundamentalism, provocative remarks by ministers, ruling party leaders, and moral policing by right-wing organisations in India.

== Bibliography ==
- Uggu Paalu

== Filmography ==
- Daasi (1988)
- Komaram Bheem (1990)
- Hari Villu (2003)
