= Army (1996 film) =

- Theatrical release poster
- Directed by: Raam Shetty
- Written by: Sanjeev Duggal; Anees Bazmee (dialogue)
- Produced by: Mukul Anand; Nitin Manmohan
- Starring: Sridevi; Shah Rukh Khan; Danny Denzongpa
- Cinematography: Rajeev Jain; Rajiv Jain
- Music by: Anand–Milind
- Distributed by: Zee Entertainment Enterprises
- Release date: 28 June 1996
- Running time: 175 minutes
- Country: India
- Language: Hindi
- Budget: ₹4 crore
- Box office: ₹17.3 crore

Army is a 1996 Indian Hindi-language action film directed by Raam Shetty. The film stars Sridevi, Shah Rukh Khan, Mohnish Behl, Sudesh Berry, Ronit Roy, Harish, Ravi Kishan, Kiran Kumar, and Danny Denzongpa. The film was reportedly inspired by the 1985 film Aandhi-Toofan.

== Plot ==
The story follows Face Flashback Major Arjun Singh (Shah Rukh Khan), a dutiful army officer and Friend of acclaimed Jailer Raghuvir Singh (Kiran Kumar). He is in love with Geeta (Sridevi), and they get married, and Geeta gets pregnant. Arjun soon gets involved in the bad books of a notorious gangster named Naagraj (Danny Denzongpa). Arjun starts working undercover in Nagraj's gang, but soon enough, Nagraj is informed about Arjun's real identity, and Arjun is brutally killed face off. When Geeta finds out, she decides to avenge Arjun's murder. When Naagraj finds out that Geeta is out for vengeance, he scoffs at her, refusing to believe that a lone defenseless widow can do him any harm. But Naagraj is in for a surprise when he comes face to face with Geeta and a group of young convicted men on the run who are dedicated to bringing him down - even if they die trying.

== Cast ==
- Sridevi as Geeta Arjun Singh
- Shah Rukh Khan as Major Arjun Singh (special appearance)
- Danny Denzongpa as Naagraj
- Sudesh Berry as Khan
- Mohnish Behl as Kabir
- Ronit Roy as Kevin
- Ravi Kishan as Kartar
- Harish Kumar as Kishan
- Aashif Sheikh as Rahul
- Ashok Saraf as Pascal
- Kiran Kumar as Jailer Raghuveer Singh
- Tinnu Anand as Pancham, Rahul's father.
- Kanchan as Bobby, Naagraj's daughter.
- Neena Softa as Gayatri Singh, Arjun's younger sister
- Neelam Mehra as Pascal's wife, Reeta's mother
- Raymon Singh as Reeta, Kevin's girlfriend.
- Vikas Anand as Police Commissioner
- Arun Bakshi as Corrupt Police Inspector Bakshi
- Dinesh Hingoo as Parsi Baba

== Soundtrack ==
Army

Soundtrack album by Anand–Milind
- Released: 1996
- Genre: Feature film soundtrack
- Label: United Music

The soundtrack was composed by Anand–Milind, with lyrics written by Sameer.

#	Title	Singer(s)	Length
1	"Main To Hoon Pagal Munda"	Vinod Rathod & Alka Yagnik	05:41
2	"Dil Mein Kuch Hone Laga"	Kumar Sanu & Sadhana Sargam	06:10
3	"De Taali"	Vinod Rathod, Abhijeet, Jolly Mukherjee & Sadhana Sargam	07:03
4	"Ek Beeti Hui Kahani"	Alka Yagnik	05:18
5	"Achiko Bachiko"	Udit Narayan, Aditya Narayan & Sadhana Sargam	05:23
6	"Ho Gayee Tiyar Hamari Army"	Vinod Rathod, Abhijeet, Jolly Mukherjee & Alka Yagnik	06:39

== Box office ==
Army was the 18th-highest-grossing film of 1996 worldwide. It opened on Friday, 28 June 1996, across 190 screens, and earned ₹63 lakh (US$65,000) nett on its opening day. It grossed ₹1.74 crore (US$180,000) nett in its opening weekend, and had a first week of ₹2.99 crore (US$310,000) nett. The film earned a total of ₹6.58 crore (US$680,000) nett. It is the 19th-highest-grossing film of 1996 in India.

It earned $85,000 (₹29.96 lakh) outside India. Overseas, It was the 18th-highest-grossing film of 1996.
