= Potturi Venkateswara Rao =

Indian journalist (1934–2020)

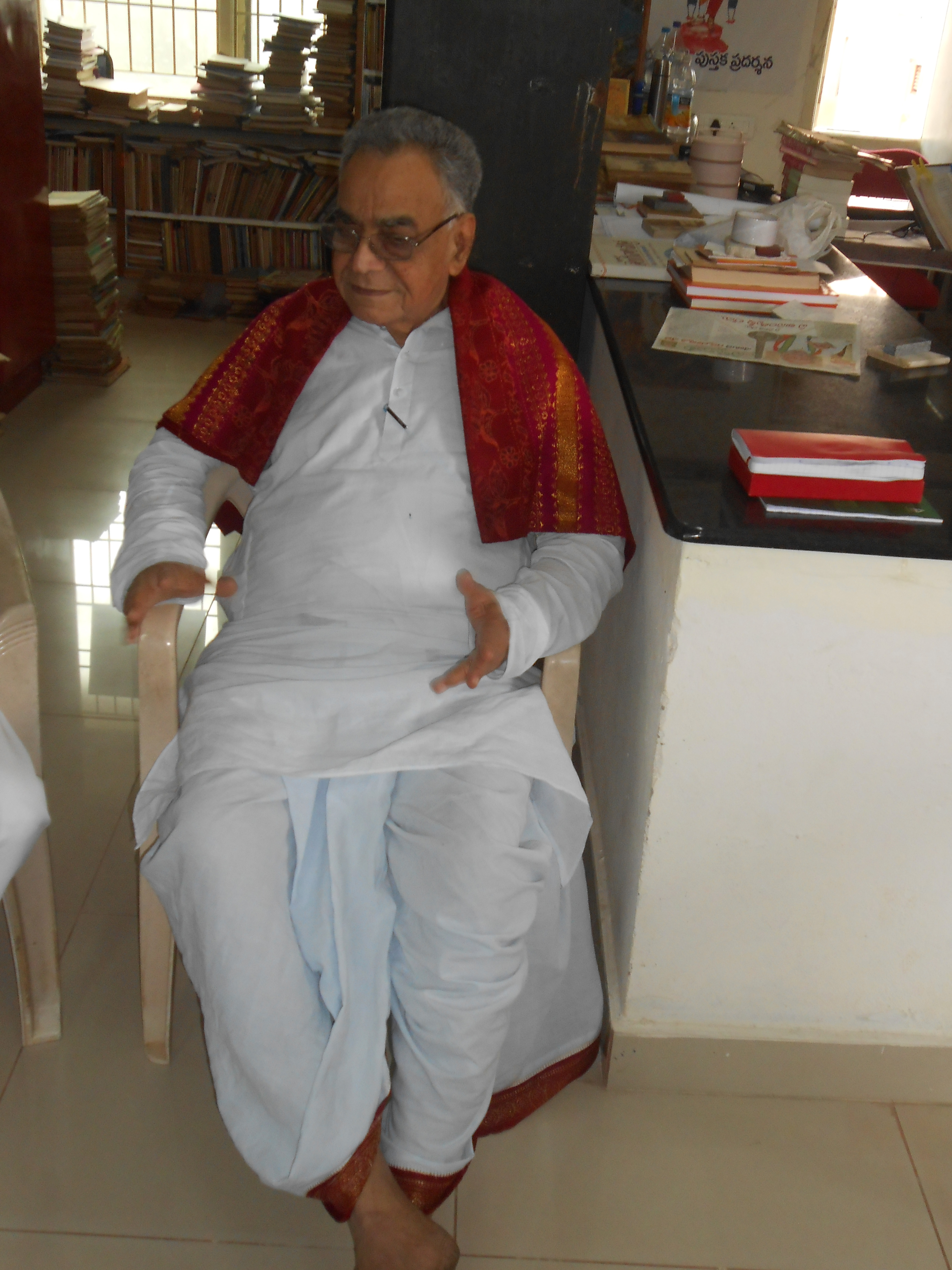
- Potturi Venkateswara Rao.
- Born: 8 February 1934; Potturu, Guntur, Andhra Pradesh
- Died: 5 March 2020 (aged 86)
- Occupations: Journalist, writer

Potturi Venkateswara Rao (8 February 1934 – 5 March 2020) was an Indian Telugu language journalist. He worked with all major Telugu dailies like Andhra Bhoomi, Eenadu, Andhra Prabha and Udayam.

== Early life ==
Potturi Venkateswara Rao was born in Potturu, Guntur, Andhra Pradesh.

== Career ==
Potturi Venkateswara Rao's career started with Andhrajanata in 1957. He was the chief editor of Eenadu, a widely circulated Telugu daily, at one point in his life. He writes columns in all major Telugu newspapers. He worked as Chairman of the Press Academy.

He co-authored a book in English on P. V. Narasimha Rao called as Years of Power.

== Bibliography ==
- Aadhyatmika Padakosam – Dictionary of Philosophic words in Telugu
- Naatipatrikala Meti Viluvalu – October 2000
- Chintana – a compilation of articles (2001 March)
- Chirasmaraneeyulu – (personality sketches) (March 2001)
- Years of Power
