= Kanchan (actress) =

Indian actress and former model (born 1970)

Kanchan (born 17 April 1970) is a former Indian actress and model. She has appeared in Hindi, Telugu, and Malayalam films, primarily in the 1990s.

== Career ==
Kanchan acted in several films, including Sanam Bewafa (1991). She was then seen with Mohanlal in Gandharvam (1993) and worked alongside Ajith Kumar's debut film Prema Pustakam. Kanchan's films include Gandharvam, Amaanat, and Coolie No.1.

== Filmography ==
Year	Film	Role	Language	Notes
1991	Sanam Bewafa	Kanchan	Hindi	
1992	Do Hanso Ka Joda		Hindi	
1993	Gandharvam	Sreedevi Menon	Malayalam	
1993	Aulad Ke Dushman	Chanda Bhargav	Hindi	
1993	Shabnam	Shabnam	Hindi	
1993	Kasam Teri Kasam		Hindi	
1993	Prema Pusthakam	Charitra	Telugu	
1994	Kranti Kshetra		Hindi	
1994	Lucky Chance	Bhanu	Telugu	
1994	Allari Premikudu	Jogeswari Devi	Telugu	
1994	Amaanat	Radha	Hindi	
1995	Paandav	Nisha Tiwari	Hindi	
1995	Coolie No.1	Shalini	Hindi	
1996	Jurmana	Pooja	Hindi	
1996	Army	Bobby	Hindi	
1996	Ram Aur Shyam	Thakur's daughter	Hindi	
1997	Itihaas	Ganga	Hindi	
1998	Mohabbat Aur Jung	Bijli	Hindi	
2001	Uljhan	Kusum	Hindi	

== Awards ==
- She won Nandi Special Jury Award for Best Performance in Prema Pusthakam film (1993).
