= Daasi (1988 film) =

1988 film directed by B. Narsing Rao

- Directed by: B. Narsing Rao
- Written by: B. Narsing Rao; K. N. T. Sastry (additional screenplay)
- Produced by: B. Narsing Rao
- Starring: Archana; Bhoopal Reddy; Rupa
- Cinematography: Apurba Kishore Bir
- Release date: 26 June 1988
- Running time: 94 minutes
- Country: India
- Language: Telugu

Daasi (transl. A bonded women) is a 1988 Indian Telugu-language drama film written and directed by B. Narsing Rao starring Archana as Daasi Kamalakshi. The film won five honors including Best Feature Film in Telugu at the 36th National Film Awards, "For portraying the grim reality of a feaudal milieu through original and rare use of film language" as cited by the Jury, and the Diploma of Merit award at the 16th Moscow International Film Festival in 1989. The film was subsequently screened in the Indian Panorama section at the 12th International Film Festival of India.

== Plot ==
The story is of Kamalakshi (Archana), a bonded woman known as Daasi in Hyderabad State in the 1920s in Telangana region. She has been sold by her family for money to be the servant of a wealthy couple. She is expected to do every chore imaginable in their house. She is also required to be the sexual toy of the man of the house (Dora) and his guests – anywhere and at any time of the day or night. When she becomes pregnant, she endures and hopes to keep the baby. However she is forced to have an abortion.

== Cast ==
- Archana as Kamalakshi
- Bhoopal Reddy
- Roopa
- Ananda Chakrapani as Bavamaridi

== Awards ==
National Film Awards

- National Film Award for Best Feature Film in Telugu – B. Narsing Rao
- National Film Award for Best Cinematography – Apurba Kishore Bir
- National Film Award for Best Actress – Archana
- National Film Award for Best Costume Design – 'Daasi' Sudarshan (a Govt Drawing Teacher at Hillcolony,Nagarjunasagar, Nalgonda district, Telangana state https://www.thehansindia.com/telangana/national-award-winner-dasi-sudarshan-is-no-more-869825)
- National Film Award for Best Art Direction – T. Vaikundham
