= Mounika =

Indian actress

- Born: Vijaya Rekha
- Other names: Mounika, Mounica
- Occupations: Actress, voice artist
- Spouse: Balu Mahendra (m. 1998; died 2014)
- Awards: Kalaimamani Award (2006)

Vijaya Rekha, known by her stage name Mounika, is an Indian film and television actress who appeared in South Indian films and Tamil television serials. She was the third wife of director Balu Mahendra.

== Personal life ==
Mounika was living together with Balu Mahendra. Balu Mahendra has confirmed his relationship with Mounika in many of his interviews and also in his blog. They started living together in 1996 and married in 1998, but went public about their marriage only in 2004.

== Film career ==
Mounika was introduced by Balu Mahendra in the film Un Kannil Neer Vazhindal that was released in 1985.

== Awards ==
- 2006: Received title of Kalaimamani Award by the Government of Tamil Nadu, which is the highest state honour in the field of Arts.

== Partial filmography ==
=== Films ===
- Note: all films are in Tamil, unless otherwise noted.

Year	Film	Role	Notes
1985	Un Kannil Neer Vazhindal	Handicap lady	
1985	Yathra	Singer Girl on the bus	Malayalam film
1987	Rettai Vaal Kuruvi	Dancer in group	
1990	Komaram Bheem	Komaram Bheem's wife	Telugu film
1991	Thalattu Ketkuthamma	Valli	
1992	Vanna Vanna Pookkal	Shenbagam	Debut as lead
1992	Rasukutty	Poovaatha	Guest appearance
1993	Amaravathi	Geetha, Balasubramaniam's daughter	
1994	May Madham		
1996	Subash	Arumugasamy's wife	
1997	Thambi Durai		
1999	Mugam	Anjala	
2000	Manasu	Lakshmi	
2001	En Iniya Ponnilave	Rosie	
2010	Baana Kaathadi	Ramesh's mother	
2018	Kadaikutty Singam	Mangamma Rani (Samiyadi)	
2020	Meendum Oru Mariyathai	Meenakshi	
2021	Anandham Vilayadum Veedu	Thangam	
2023	Kannagi	Sarala	

=== Voice Artist ===
Year	Film	Actress
1996	Kalki	Shruti
1997	Raman Abdullah	Eswari Rao
2002	Kannathil Muthamittal	Eswari Rao
2003	Julie Ganapathy	Ramya Krishnan

== Television ==
Year	Title	Role	Channel
1997	Nimmathi Ungal Choice-2	Kannama	Sun TV
1997–1999	Galatta Kudumbam		Sun TV
2000	Sontham	Akhila	Sun TV
2000	Take It Easy Vazhkai		Sun TV
2000	Balu Mahendravin Kathai Neram		Sun TV
2000–2001	Akhila		Gemini TV
2001–2002	Aalu Magalu		Gemini TV
2003–2007	Sorgam	Kanchana/Seetha (Maayamma)	Sun TV
2006	Sharadha		Raj TV
2008–2009	Anandham Vilaiyadum Veedu		Kalaignar TV
2019–2020	Agni Natchathiram	Jeyanthi Selvam	Sun TV
2019–2020	Ayutha Ezhuthu	Kaaliammal	Star Vijay
2023–2025	Aaha Kalyanam	Koodeswari	Star Vijay
