= Nanduri Ramamohanarao =

Telugu writer and journalist

Nanduri Ramamohanarao (24 April 1927 – 2 September 2011) was a Telugu writer and journalist. He worked in multiple roles in Andhra Jyothy Telugu newspaper since its inception in 1960 till his retirement in 1994. He translated numerous works from English to Telugu. He also wrote a number of books for children. He was also a poet and lyricist. He was also a good music composer and singer.

== Life ==
Rama Mohanarao was born in Vissannapeta mandal in Krishna District in Andhra Pradesh, India. He did his schooling in Nuzvid and Machilipatnam between 1937 and 1942. He pursued his higher education in Government Arts College at Rajahmundry between 1942 and 1947. He married Rajeswari in 1944.

Nanduri worked in various editorial capacities, in Andhra Patrika Telugu newspaper, between 1948 and 1960. Later he rendered his services as honorary editor to Udayam daily. Later, he joined the newly formed newspaper Andhra Jyothy in 1960, where he retired as the editor, in 1994.

He visited many nations like USA, UK, Russia etc. He introduced many writers like Yaddanapudi Sulochana Rani.

He died in Vijayawada, India on 2 September 2011, due to intracranial hemorrhage. He is survived by wife, two sons and three daughters.

== Writings ==
- Viswaroopam (A collection of essays on the structure of Universe, serialized in Andhrajyothy, in 1969)
- Naravataram (A collection of essays on Charles Darwin's theory of evolution, serialized in Andhrajyothy, during 1971)
- Viswadarshanam - Paschatya Chintana (A collection of essays on Western Philosophy)
- Viswadarshanam - Bharatiya Chintana (A collection of essays on Indian philosophy)
- Anupallavi (A collection of Andhrajyothy Editorials, on various contemporary issues)
- Chiranjeevulu ( A collection of Andhrajyothy Editorials on various personalities)
- Vyaasavali (A collection of Andhrajyothy Editorials)
- Akshara Yatra (Literary Essays)
- Ushashvini (A collection of poems)
- Chilaka cheppina rahasyam (The secret that the parrot told - A children's novel)
- Mayoorakanya (Peacock woman - A Children's novel)
- Harivillu (Rainbow - Songs for Children)

== Translations ==
- Kanchanadweepam (translation of Robert Louis Stevenson's Treasure Island)
- Kathageya Sudhanidhi (based on Aesop's Fables)
- Tomsawyer (translation of Mark Twain's Adventures of Tom Sawyer)
- Huckleberry Finn (translation of Mark Twain's Adventures of Huckleberry Finn)
- Raju-Peda (translation of Mark Twain's The Prince and the Pauper)
- Vichitra Vyakti (translation of Mark Twain's The Mysterious Stranger)
- Balaraju (translation of Oscar Wilde's stories)
