= Allani Sridhar =

Indian screenwriter and film director (born 1962)

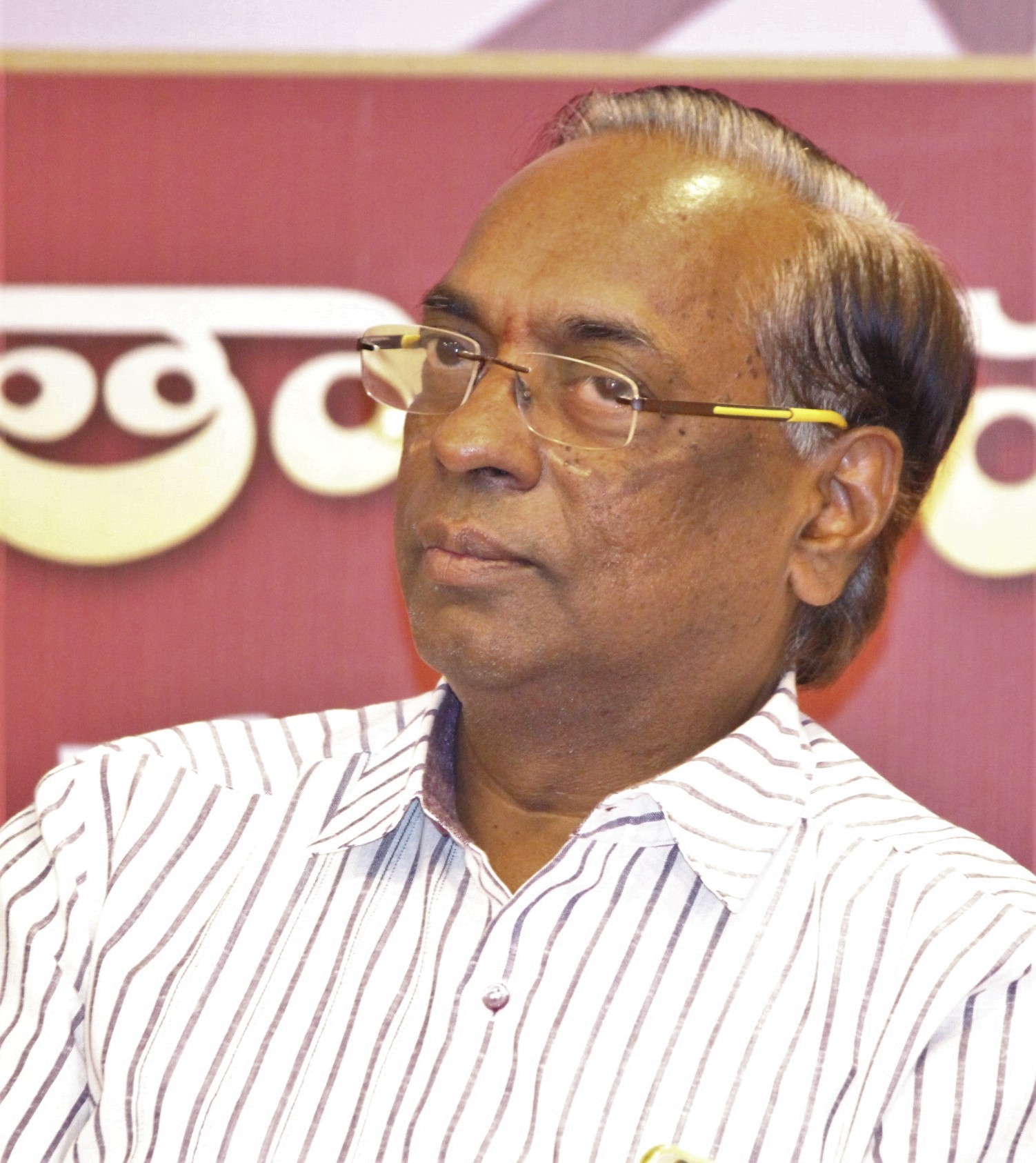
- Born: 24 June 1962 (age 64); Medak, Telangana, India
- Occupations: Dialogue writer screenwriter Film director Ad director
- Years active: 1988–present
- Spouse: Allani Nirmala

Allani Sridhar is an Indian screenwriter and film director working mainly in Telugu cinema. He made his directorial debut with the critically acclaimed 1988 biopic feature film, Komaram Bheem, in which he also acted. In 1990, the film won the then Andhra Pradesh state Nandi Award for best film on national integration.

== Career ==
Sridhar began his career as a director with a film about Gond tribal people titled Komaram Bheem, for which he won an award for best director from the Government of Andhra Pradesh. He has made several devotional films.

== Awards and honours ==
Nandi Awards

- Nandi Award for Best First Film of a Director - Komaram Bheem
- Nandi TV Award for Best Screenplay Writer – Katama Raju Kathalu

Other Awards

- Komaram Bheem Memorial National Award

== Filmography ==
Year	Title	Language	Notes
1990	Komaram Bheem	Telugu	
1992	Raguluthunna Bharatham	Telugu	
1993	Preme Naa Pranam	Telugu	
1999	Tuhi Meri Ganga	Hindi	
2003	Uthsaaham	Telugu	
2004	Jai Balaji	Telugu	
2008	Tathagatha Buddha	Hindi; Telugu	
2010	Hanuman Chalisa	Telugu	
2013	Goswami Tulasidas	Hindi	
2018	Chilukuru Balaji	Telugu	

As producer

- Hostel Days (2012)

=== Television ===
- Adi Parasakthi
