= Athili Sattibabu LKG =

- Directed by: E. V. V. Satyanarayana
- Screenplay by: E. V. V. Satyanarayana; Satish Vegesna
- Dialogues by: Satish Vegnesa; Varaprasad Varma; D Nagaraju; Balaram
- Story by: Varaprasad Varma; E. V. V. Satyanarayana
- Produced by: E. V. V. Satyanarayana
- Starring: Allari Naresh; Kausha Rach; Sheetal; Vidisha
- Cinematography: V. Jayaram
- Edited by: Gautham Raju
- Music by: Sri Krishna
- Production company: E. V .V. Cinema
- Release date: 6 April 2007
- Country: India
- Language: Telugu

Athili Sattibabu LKG is a 2007 Telugu comedy film starring Allari Naresh and Kausha Rach, directed by E. V. V. Satyanarayana. Allari Naresh played a pawnbroker in the film, while Raghu Babu and Sunil played his wayward brothers.

== Plot ==
Athili Sathibabu (Allari Naresh), a ruthless moneylender who charges exorbitant interest and fleeces people, realises the value of love and relationship after falling in love with a beautician (Kausha).The rest of the film is about how Sattibabu mends his ways.

== Cast ==
- Allari Naresh as Athili Sathibabu
- Vidisha Srivastava as Ammulu
- Kausha Rach as Pranathi
- Brahmanandam
- Sunil as Athili Sathibabu's brother
- Venu Madhav
- Dharmavarapu Subramanyam as Lawyer Jagannadham
- Ali
- Babu Mohan
- Krishna Bhagawan as Chairperson
- M. S. Narayana
- Mallikarjuna Rao
- Chalapati Rao as Chairperson's bodyguard
- L. B. Sriram as Ammulu's father
- Raghu Babu as Athili Sathibabu's brother
- Kondavalasa
- Lakshmipati as Mangatayaru's assistant
- Kadambari Kirankumar
- Duvvasi Mohan
- Srinivasa Reddy
- Uttej as Athili Sathibabu's friend
- Kallu Krishna Rao
- Gundu Sudharshan
- Maharshi Raghava
- Uma Devi as a sex worker
- Kakinada Malli
- Lathasri
- Abhinayashree as Mangatayaru
- Satya Krishnan as the wife of Athili Sathibabu's brother
- Bhargavi
- Aruna
- Archana
- S. L. Bhargavi
- Mounika

== Production ==
The muhurat took place at Ramoji Film City at 1 January 2006. The first schedule was held from 1 to 25 January 2007 at Ramoji Film City, Hyderabad. The penultimate 4-day schedule took place in January-end in Hyderabad, followed by a major schedule, from 1 to 25 February, in Rajamahendravaram. Of the five songs in the film, one was shot on sets, one in Rajamahendravaram and three of them abroad.

== Soundtrack ==
The music was composed by Sri Krishna and released by Aditya Music. The audio launch took place at Club Jayabheri, Hyderabad on 21 March 2007 with D. Ramanaidu, Ravi Teja, S. S. Rajamouli, R. Narayana Murthy, Sridhar Lagadapati, Muppalaneni Siva as the chief guests. The song "Shake Break" was heavily inspired by "Get Busy" by Sean Paul.

Athili Sattibabu LKG

Soundtrack album by Sri Krishna
- Released: 2007
- Recorded: 2007
- Genre: Soundtrack
- Length: 27:47
- Label: Aditya Music
- Producer: Sri Krishna

Track list
No.	Title	Lyrics	Singer(s)	Length
1.	"Ee Chali Galullona"	Suddala Ashok Teja	Udit Narayan, Shreya Ghoshal	5:02
2.	"Nee Pai Manasu"	Sai Sri Harsha	Suchitra, Tippu	5:11
3.	"Amrutha Varsham La"	Jonnavittula Ramalingeswara Rao	K. S. Chithra, Harish Raghavendra	4:13
4.	"Shake Break"	Jonnavittula Ramalingeswara Rao	Noel James, Jassie Gift	4:10
5.	"Ra Ra Ante"	Suddala Ashok Teja	Shreya Ghoshal, Karthik	4:57
6.	"Amrutha Varsham La-2"	Jonnavittula Ramalingeswara Rao	K. S. Chithra, Harish Raghavendra	4:14
Total length:				27:47

== Reception ==
Jeevi of Idlebrain.com rated the film 3/5 and wrote, "On a whole, Athili Sathibabu is a typical EVV comedy film".
