= En Iniya Pon Nilavae =

2001 film by Balu Mahendra

- Title card
- Directed by: Balu Mahendra
- Written by: Balu Mahendra
- Produced by: R. Prabhavati
- Starring: Pandiarajan; Mounika
- Cinematography: Balu Mahendra
- Edited by: Harichandra
- Music by: Ilaiyaraaja; M. S. Viswanathan
- Production company: SDR Movies
- Release date: 11 May 2001
- Running time: 113 minutes
- Country: India
- Language: Tamil

En Iniya Pon Nilavae (transl. My sweet, golden moon) is a 2001 Indian Tamil-language film photographed and directed by Balu Mahendra, starring Pandiarajan and Mounika. Though completed in the 1990s, it was released only on 11 May 2001.

== Cast ==
- Pandiarajan as Shiva
- Mounika as Rosie
- Suresh Chakravarthi
- Vichithra
- Vasanth
- Oru Viral Krishna Rao
- LIC Narasimhan
- Raman
- Indira
- Shanmugasundari
- Vani
- V. R. Thilagam

== Production ==
The film was initially titled Amma Appa Vilaiyaatu and was completed in the 1990s but remained unreleased. In late 2000, the project re-emerged under a new title En Iniya Pon Nilavae.

== Soundtrack ==
Soundtrack was composed by M. S. Viswanathan and Ilaiyaraaja, with lyrics by Vairamuthu.

Song	Singers
"Thalirkalil Pookkal"	K. J. Yesudas
"Kadhal Ninaive"	K. J. Yesudas
"Sillendra Malare"	K. S. Chithra
"Poo Vendume"	Vani Jairam, S. P. Balasubrahmanyam
"Pudhu Kadalai"	L. R. Eswari
