= Neelam Mehra =

Indian television and film actress

Neelam Mehra (born 1 May 1955) is an Indian television and film actress, best known for her role as Bani Luthra in Zee TV's Kundali Bhagya.

== Filmography ==
- Khoon Ki Keemat (1974) as Chanda
- Nagin (1976) as Sheela
- Mukti (1977) as Herself (Cameo appearance)
- Tumhare Liye (1978) as Renuka / Kalavati
- Inspector Eagle (1979) as Shilpi
- Kanoon Ka Shikar (1979)
- Gehra Zakhm (1981) as Salma
- Hotel (1981) as Shushma
- Zamane Ko Dikhana Hai (1981) as Kavita
- Khara Khota (1981) as Courtesan
- Jiyo To Aise Jiyo (1981) as Pinky Sharma
- Jwala Daku (1981) as Qawali Singer
- Tadalp (1982) as Alka
- Pyaar Ke Rahi (1982) as Bela
- Dulha Bikta Hai (1982) as Rita
- Suzanne (1983)
- Pasand Apni Apni (1983) as Neelam
- Talabandi (1983)
- Teri Baahon Mein (1984) as Pammi
- Grahasthi (1984)
- Sej Piya Ki (1985)
- Dil Ek Musafir (1985)
- Zulm Ka Badla (1985) as Bijli
- Cheekh (1985)
- Aadamkhor (1986) as Neelam Kaur
- Mr. India (1987) as Neelam
- Khooni Mahal (1987) as Kiran
- Padosi Ki Biwi (1988)
- Ghar Aakhir Ghar Hai (1988)
- 7 Bijliyaan (1988) as Hera Pheri
- Wohi Bhayanak Raat (1989)
- Rakhwala (1989) as Jhingania Mole
- Purani Haveli (1989) as Seema Kumar
- Shaitani Ilaaka (1990) as Lalbai / Shalaka
- Jagira (1990)
- Aakhri Cheekh (1991) as Priya Kumar
- Meet Mere Man Ke (1991) as Vidya
- Roohani Taqat (1991) as Neelam
- 100 Days (1991) as Parvati Chauhan
- Bol Radha Bol ( 1991 ) as Bijlee
- Insaan Bana Shaitan (1992) as Namita Kapoor
- Judaai Yaar Ki (1992) (Unreleased film)
- Yeh Raat Phir Na Aayegi (1992) as Gulabo
- 15th August (1993) as Neelam
- Mere Data Garib Nawaz (1994)
- Betaaj Badshah (1994) as Mrs. Daaga
- Amaanat (1994) as Neelam
- Himmatvar (1996) as Mrs. Rajeshwar
- Army (1996) as Pascal's wife
- Aisi Bhi Kya Jaldi Hai (1996) as Mrs. Poonam Mehra
- Maharaja (1998) as Neelam
- Kaala Mandir (2000)

== Television ==
- Dhamaal (1987–1988)
- Maya Jaal (1994)
- Tehkikaat (1994)
- The Zee Horror Show (1995)
- Sapno Ki Duniya (1995–1996)
- Shadyantra (1996–1997)
- Hina (1996–1997)
- The Zee Horror Show (1996) as Maria
- Yug (1997)
- Shaktimaan (1997–2005) as Maansi
- Kasamm (1999)
- Mehndi Tere Naam Ki (2000–2002)
- Kahaani Ghar Ghar Kii (2000–2008) as Vandana Agarwal
- Kabhii Sautan Kabhii Sahelii (2001–2002) as Tanu's Mother
- Kohi Apna Sa (2001–2003) as Sheetal Vikram Gill
- Kya Hadsaa Kya Haqeeqat (2003)
- Kayaamat 2003–2005) as Naina Naren Ahuja
- Kkusum (2005) as Mrs. Raichand
- Woh Rehne Waali Mehlon Ki (2005–2011) as Mrs. Kumar
- Kasamh Se (2006–2009) as Mrs. Tyagi
- Saas v/s Bahu (2008) as Herself
- Kitani Mohabbat Hai (season 2) (2011) as Teji Singhania
- Sammaan Ek Adhikaar (2011) as Nirmala / Maaji
- Naagin (2015)
- Kundali Bhagya as Bani Luthra (2017–2024)
