= Kausha Rach =

Indian actress

Kausha Rach is an Indian film actress who works in Telugu cinema. She has acted in various Telugu films including Premaya Namaha, Bhagavantudu, Prarambham, Athili Sattibabu LKG, Gautama Buddha and Kuberulu.

== Filmography ==
- Manmadhudu (2002)
- Premaya Namaha
- Dil (2003)
- Utsaham (2003)
- Alex (2005)
- Raraju (2006)
- Vikramarkudu (2006)
- Athili Sattibabu LKG (2007)
- Mantra (2007)
- Gautama Buddha (2008)
- Kuberulu (2008)
- Blade Babji (2008)
- Nenu Meeku Telusa (2008)
- Bhagavantudu (2009)
- Indumathi (2009)
- Ninaithale Inikkum (2009; Tamil)
- Siddhu +2 (2009; Tamil)
- Broker (2010)
- N.H-5 (2010)
- Arjunudu (2010)
- Prarambham (2011)
- Kireetam (2011)
- Dr. Paramanandayya's Students Gang (2012)
- Mahankali (2013)
