= Manasu (film) =

- Directed by: Abdul Rahman
- Written by: Abdul Rahman; Shaaru Raaj (dialogues)
- Produced by: Sheela Shiva; S. Sivaraman
- Starring: Gandhi Mohan; Oviya
- Cinematography: Abdul Rahman
- Edited by: DSR Subash
- Music by: Deva
- Production company: Sheela Cine Arts
- Release date: 15 December 2000
- Running time: 125 minutes
- Country: India
- Language: Tamil

Manasu (transl. Heart) is a 2000 Indian Tamil language romantic drama film directed by Abdul Rahman. The film stars newcomer Sakthi and Oviya, with Sanjeev Kumar, S. Suryakiran, Vijayakumar, Jayachitra, Senthil, Kovai Sarala, Jeeva and Mounika playing supporting roles. It was released on 15 December 2000.

== Plot ==
Sanjeev (Sakthi) is a studious college student, while the carefree Vicky (Sanjeev Kumar) spends his time causing trouble in college. During the college exhibition, Sanjeev accidentally hurts Nandhini (Oviya) on her hand and immediately apologizes for his mistake. An angry Vicky then gets into a fight with Sanjeev, but Sanjeev beats Vicky and his friends up. Nandhini's mother Pankajam (Jayachitra) becomes overprotective and suspects her daughter of being in love with their neighbor Sanjeev. Being sick of this situation, one day, an impulsive Nandhini kisses Sanjeev in front of her mother. The two eventually fall in love. When her father (Vijayakumar), an ambassador, returns home from abroad, he tries to convince Nandhini to forget her lover, but Nandhini wants to marry Sanjeev at all means. Nandhini's father then learns that Sanjeev killed his mother and tells it to his daughter. Meanwhile, at a college excursion, Vicky and his friends try to rape their collegemate Juli (Jeeva), but Sanjeev comes to her rescue, and Nandhini spits on Vicky's face. Vicky and his friends are consequently expelled from college, and Vicky swears to take revenge on the lovers.

Thereafter, Nandhini compels Sanjeev to reveal the reason for killing his mother. Many years ago, Sanjeev lived with his parents, who were poor laborers. After the death of his father, Sanjeev's mother Lakshmi (Mounika) became vulnerable, and her boss tried to woo her. One night, he entered her house and tried to rape her. The young Sanjeev had no other choice than to kill his mother to save her dignity, and he was sent to jail for his crime. He was then adopted by a wealthy foreigner who gave him everything except affection. Sanjeev tells Nandhini that she is the first person who showed him affection, and Nandhini in tears responds that he did the right thing. Nandhini's parents decided to take their daughter with them to go abroad, but they change their mind when they read her private diary, and they want her to be happy. In the meantime, Nandhini meets Sanjeev at the beach to talk about it, and a vengeful Vicky comes to the place with his friends. During the fight, Sanjeev manages to beat them up, and the couple tries to run away. Vicky then shoots Sanjeev in his leg and tries to rape Nandhini in front of Sanjeev, but Vicky leaves the gun behind him. Nandhini escapes from them and hugs a wounded Sanjeev. When Sanjeev aims the gun at Vicky and his friends, they laugh because the gun had only one bullet left. To save his lover's virginity, Sakthi presses Nandhini tightly in his arms and shoots her in her back, and both of them die.

== Cast ==
- Gandhi Mohan aka Sakthi as Sanjeev
- Oviya as Nandhini
- Sanjeev Kumar as Vicky (Vikram)
- S. Suryakiran
- Vijayakumar as Nandhini's father
- Jayachitra as Pankajam, Nandhini's mother
- Senthil as Dhamodharan
- Kovai Sarala as Santha
- Jeeva as Juli
- Mounika as Lakshmi, Sanjeev's mother
- Typist Gopu
- Chaplin Balu as college student
- Premi as Maid
- Sai Kiruba
- Madasamy
- Haribabu
- Karna
- Master Santhosh
- Mounica
- Jageera
- Gundu Kalyanam
- Gaja

== Production ==
The cinematographer Abdul Rahman, who worked in films like Kizhakku Vasal (1990), Idhayam (1991) and Ponnumani (1993), made his directorial debut with Manasu under the banner of Sheela Cine Arts. Sakthi, who acted in NDFC's Karuvelam Pookkal (1996), was chosen to play the hero while Oviya, who acted in Sathi Sanam (1997), was selected to play the heroine. Deva composed the music, the Abdul Rahman also took care of camera work and DSR Subash was the film editor. The climax of the film was shot at Muttom beach.

== Soundtrack ==
The soundtrack was composed by Deva.

All tracks are written by Vairamuthu.

Tracklist
No.	Title	Singer(s)	Length
1.	"Manchakizhangu"	Suresh Peters	04:47
2.	"Poovamal Poothavaley"	S. N. Surendar	04:49
3.	"Rock Rock"	Malgudi Subha	05:15
4.	"Orumurai Irumurai Palamurai"	P. Unnikrishnan, K. S. Chithra	05:18
5.	"Thendral Vandhu"	P. Unnikrishnan, Sheela Shiva	04:49
Total length:			24:58

== Reception ==
Malathi Rangarajan of The Hindu said, "As a young man of very few words who is always serious and pensive, Shakti makes a mark" and Oviya "could have been a little more expressive [..] The dialogue at every point, seems to have been written after giving a lot of thought to the questions that would arise in the viewer's minds. The arguments and counters of the characters bear evidence to this fact". A critic from the portal TamilBeat.com wrote of Abdul Rehman's work "he has not allowed the camera to overpower his narration goes to his credit, but Rehman chooses the same old college campus romance with its clichéd scenes as his backdrop".
