= Devi Priya =

Indian Telugu-language poet and journalist (1951–2020)

- Born: Shaik Khaja Hassan; 15 August 1951 Guntur, Andhra Pradesh, India
- Died: 21 November 2020 (aged 69) Hyderabad, Telangana, India
- Occupation: Poet, journalist, cartoonist
- Language: Telugu
- Notable works: Gaali Rangu, Adhyakshaa Mannichandi, Gareebi Geetaalu, Amma Chettu Chepa Chiluka.
- Notable awards: Sahitya Akademi Award (2017)

Shaik Khaja Hassan (15 August 1951 – 21 November 2020), popularly known by his pen name Devi Priya, was an Indian Telugu-language poet and journalist known for his political satire. He was a recipient of the 2017 Sahitya Akademi Award for his work Gaali Rangu (English: Color of the Wind). Some of his famous works included Adhyakshaa Mannichandi (English: Pardon Me, President), Gareebi Geetaalu (English: Songs of Poverty), and Amma Chettu Chepa Chiluka (English: Mother, Tree, Fish, and Parrot).

== Early life ==
Priya was born as Shaik Khaja Hassan in Tadikonda, Guntur district, in the southern state of Andhra Pradesh in India on 15 August 1951. He studied Telugu and English literature at the Andhra Christian College in Guntur.

== Career ==
As a journalist, Priya was known for his political satire including a running piece on current political events titled "Running Commentary" in the Telugu newspaper, Udayam. He later went on to provide the same commentary on local Telugu language news channels. He was also known for his satirical cartoons. A collection of his newspaper editorials was published as Adhyakshaa Mannichandi (English: Pardon me, President). Per The Hindu, the book is considered one of the most popular books for vernacular language journalists, writers, and politicians. Through his career he had worked as a journalist with Telugu newspapers Udayam, Andhra Prabha, and Hyderabad Mirror, and the English newspaper The Hans India.

As a poet, he was noted to bring along a fine balance between 'direct and ornamental' verse in his poetry. He drew from Indian mythology, including epics, for his poetry. Some of his famous works included Gareebi Geetaalu (English: Songs of poverty), and Amma Chettu Chepa Chiluka (English: Mother, Tree, Fish, and Parrot). He was also a lyricist for Telugu movies including the song "Jambal Bhari Bhari" for Maa Bhoomi (English: Our land) and other movies including Raguluthunna Bharatham (English: Raging India) and Pallaki (English: Palanquin). His versatility in themes across his works had him be compared with classical Telugu writer and poet Sri Sri.

He had also produced a full-length English language documentary, Music of a Battle, based on the life of balladeer and activist Gaddar.

He was awarded the Sahitya Akademi Award in 2017 for his collection of poems Gaali Rangu (English: Color of the Wind). He also received a UNICEF award for his documentary film script for saving the girl child.

== Personal life ==
Priya was married and had a son and a daughter. He died on 21 November 2020 at the Nizam's Institute of Medical Sciences in Hyderabad after a brief illness. He was aged 69. He was suffering from diabetes and had one of his legs amputated earlier in the month after a gangrene infection.

== Works ==
=== Books ===
- Gaali Rangu
- Running Commentary
- Aranya Puranam
- Poornamma
- Adhyakshaa Mannichandi
- Inko Appudu
- Amma Chettu Chepa Chiluka
- Neeti Putta
- Chepa Chiluka
- Tuphanu Tummeda
- Gareebu Geetaalu
- Samajananda Svaami

=== Movies (as a lyricist) ===
- Maa Bhoomi
- Raguluthunna Bharatham
- Rangula Kala
- Pallaki
