= Almonda, Koraput =

Almonda
- Village.
- Location within Odisha
- Coordinates: 18°52′0″N 83°19′0″E
- Country: India
- State: Odisha
- District: Koraput
- Elevation: 223 m (732 ft)

Population
  - Total: there is approximately total population as 1,200 around 150 house

Languages
  - Official: Odia
- Time zone: UTC+5:30 (IST)
- Postal code: 765013
- Vehicle registration: OD 10
- Website: odisha.gov.in

Almonda (also spelled Almanda or Alamanda) is a village in Koraput district, Odisha, India. As of the 2011 Census of India, it had a population of 2,178 across 565 households, with 1,095 males and 1,083 females. 1,073 residents were literate, and 292 were six years old or younger.
