= Kantakapalli =

- village
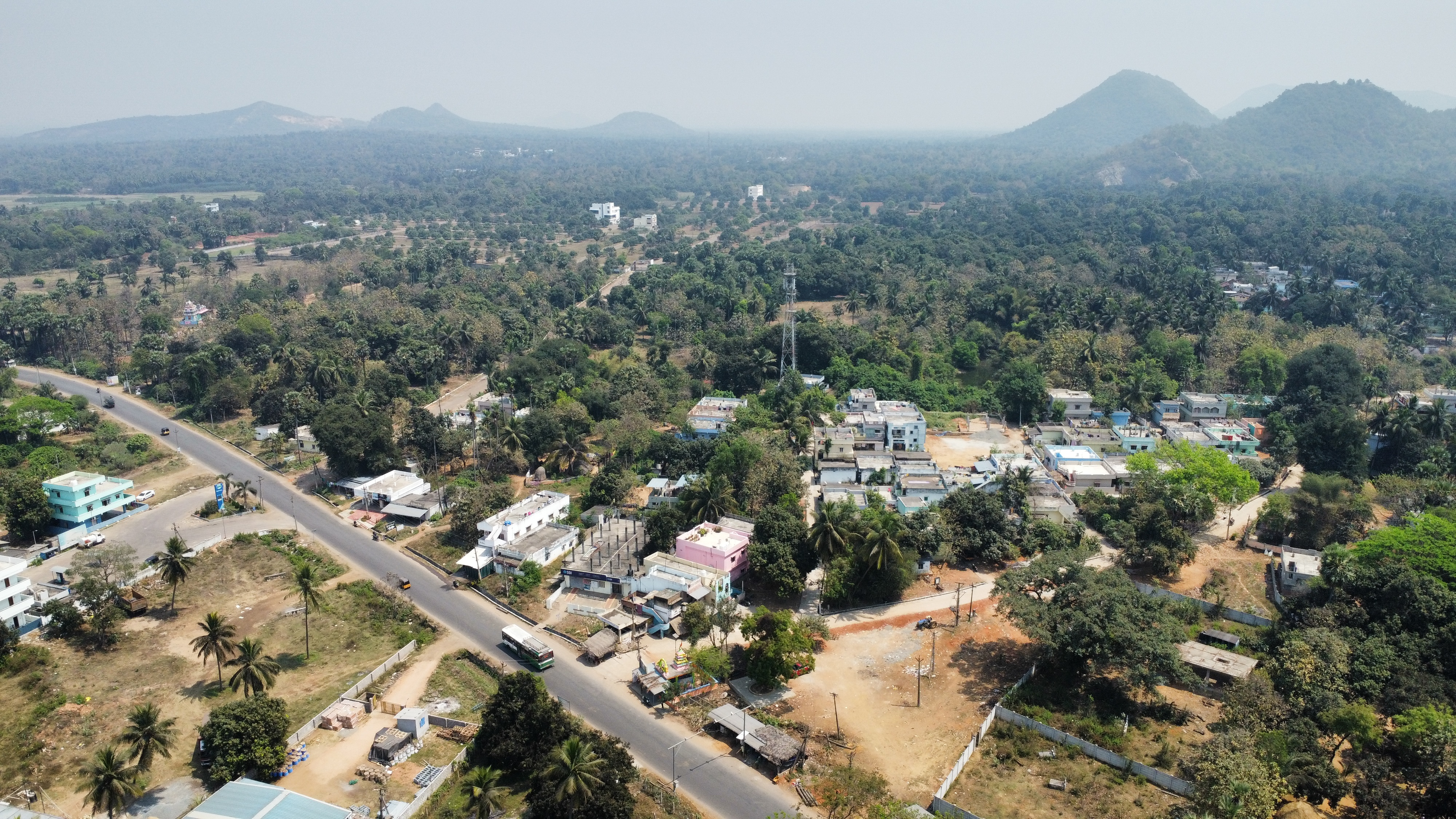
- Aerial view of Kantakapalli village
- Interactive map of Kantakapalli
- Location in Andhra Pradesh, India
- Coordinates: 17°57′08″N 83°13′03″E
- Country: India
- State: Andhra Pradesh
- District: Vizianagaram

Languages
  - Official: Telugu
- Time zone: UTC+5:30 (IST)
- Vehicle registration: AP35

Kantakapalli or Kantakapalle is a village and panchayat in Kothavalasa mandal of Vizianagaram district, Andhra Pradesh, India.

There is a railway station in Kantakapalli in Waltair division of East Coast Railway, Indian Railways.

== Demographics ==
According to Indian census, 2001, the demographic details of this village is as follows:

- Total Population: 2,613 in 724 Households.
- Male Population: 1,273
- Female Population: 1,340
- Children Under 6-years of age: 287 (Boys - 126 and Girls - 161)
- Total Literates: 2,463
