= Jami, Vizianagaram district =

Jami
- Village
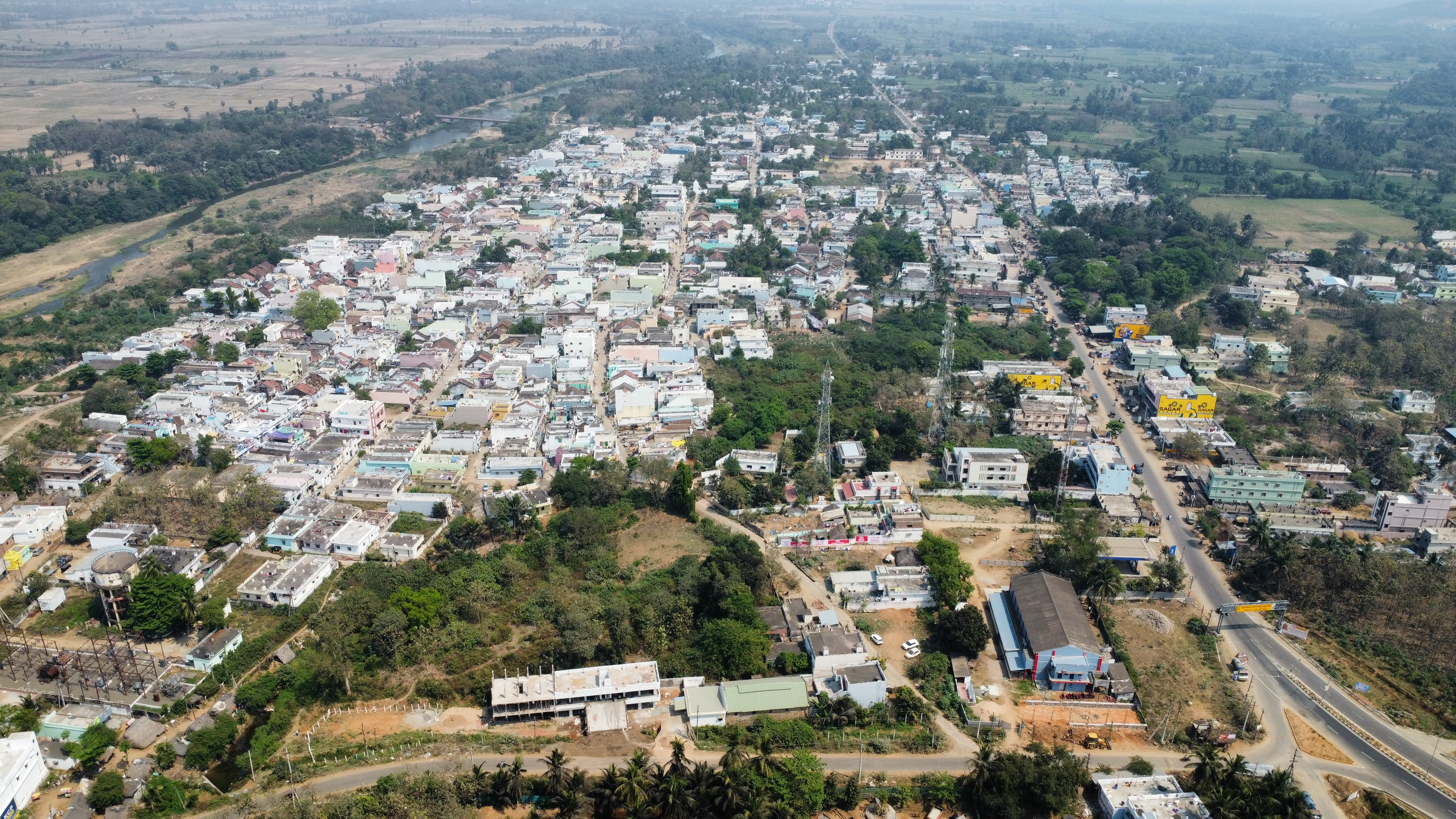
- Aerial view of Jami village
- Interactive map of Jami
- Coordinates: 18.0500°N 83.2667°E
- Country: India
- State: Andhra Pradesh
- District: Vizianagaram
- Elevation: 46 m (151 ft)

Languages
  - Official: Telugu
- Time zone: UTC+5:30 (IST)
- PIN: 535250
- Vehicle Registration: AP35 (Former); AP39 (from 30 January 2019)

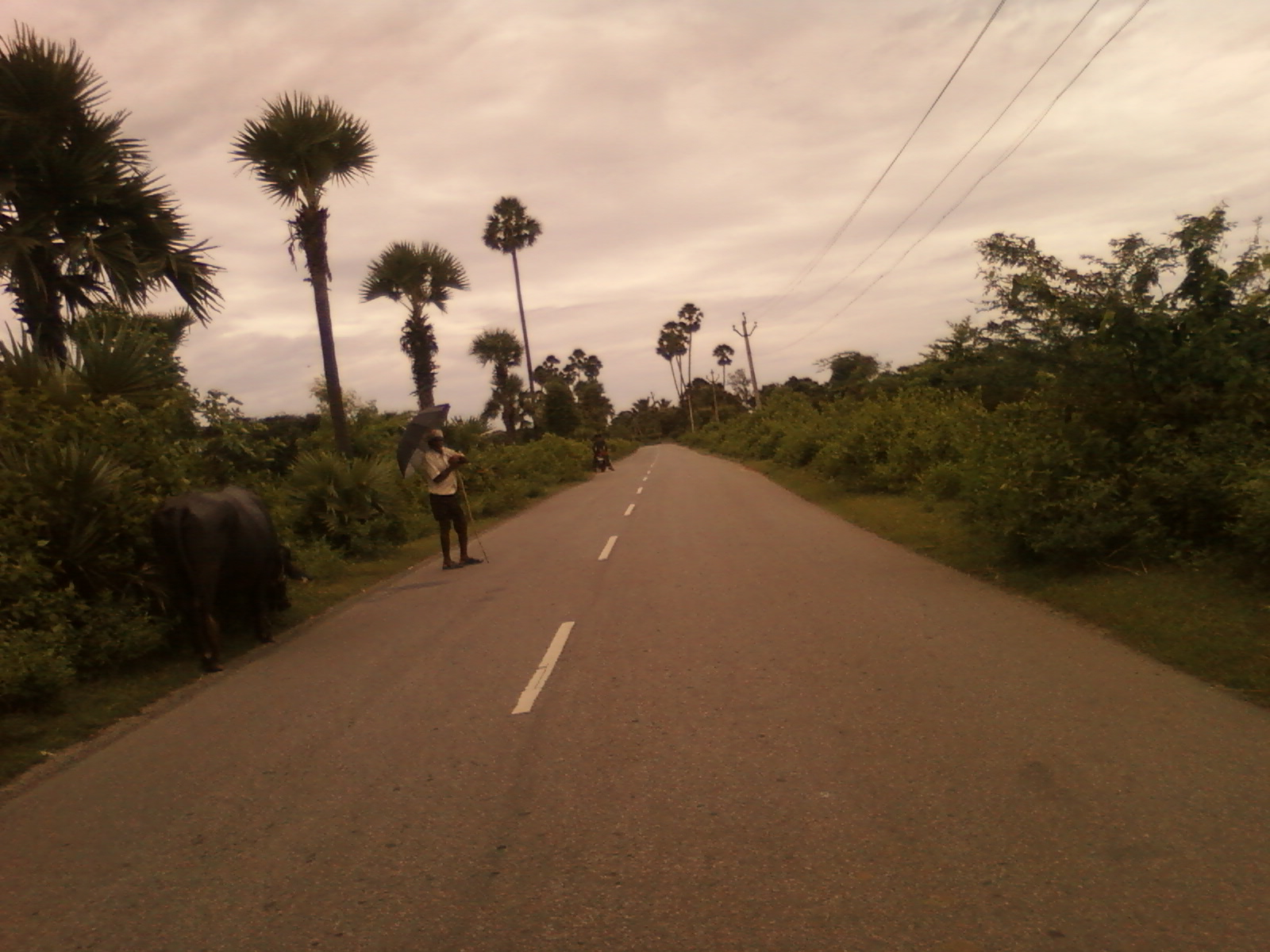
Road at Jami village

Jami (pronounced Jaami) is a village and a mandal in Vizianagaram district in the state of Andhra Pradesh in India.

== History ==
According to legend, the Pandavas of Mahabharata fame concealed their weapons on a "Jammi" tree (Shami Vruksha ) before embarking on the final year of their fourteen years of banishment into the forests during which period they have to remain incognito (Agnathavasam). During their stay, King Dharmaraja and his mother Kunthi Devi sanctified the idols of Sri Tripurantaka Swamy and Sri Janardhana Swamy, at this place. About five hundred years ago the local people unearthed an idol of Sri Madhava Swamy while quarrying for sandstone on the nearby rocky knoll. They installed it in between the earlier two temples and built a third temple named after Sri Venugopalaswamy (another name of Lord Krishna). The twin Jammi trees at the Tripurtantaka Swamy temple are considered to be holy and have miraculous healing properties. The temple is in existence at least for a thousand years as per the stone inscription on site. Modern day geologists have estimated that the Shivalinga extends more than 179 feet deep into the earth. No wonder it is called a "Swayambhu Linga". Pilgrims from the north coastal districts of Andhra Pradesh come here during the holy month of Karthik for the ritual Pujas.

== Geography ==
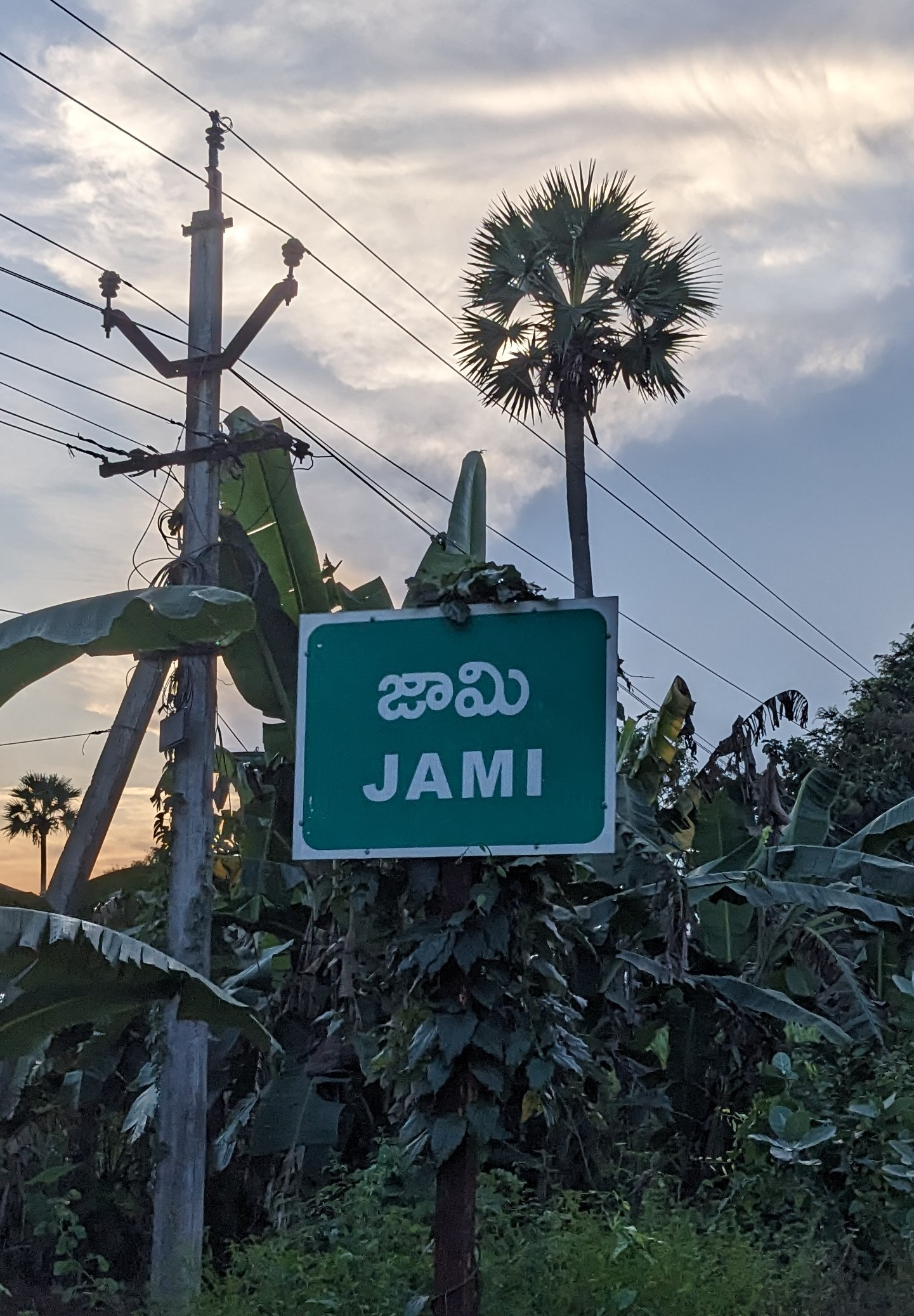
Jami road sign

Jami is located at 18.05°N 83.2667°E on the bank of the river Gosthani which has its origin in the limestone caves of Borra in the Eastern Ghats. It has an average elevation of 46 meters (154 feet).

== Demography ==
Jami Mandal has a population of 58,112 in 2001. Males constitute 29,170 and females 28,942 of the population. The average literacy rate is 51%, much below the national average of 59.5%. Male literacy rate is 63% and that of females 39%. Two public sector banks SBI and APGVB are having branches to serve public at Jami.

== Assembly constituency ==
Jami was an assembly constituency in 1967 and 1972 elections. The elected members were:

- Gorrepati Buchi Appa Rao, 1967.
- Uppalapati Appala Suryanarayana Raju, 1972.
