= Vadakarai =

Village in Tamil Nadu, India

Coordinates: 10°07′52″N 77°31′38″E

Vadakarai ('north bank') in Tharangambadi taluk, Theni district, Tamil Nadu, India, now forms part of that portion of Periyakulam municipality, which lies north of the Sankaraparani River. Still, it was once the chief village of a palaiyam of the same name.
