= K Ramachandra Murthy =

Indian journalist

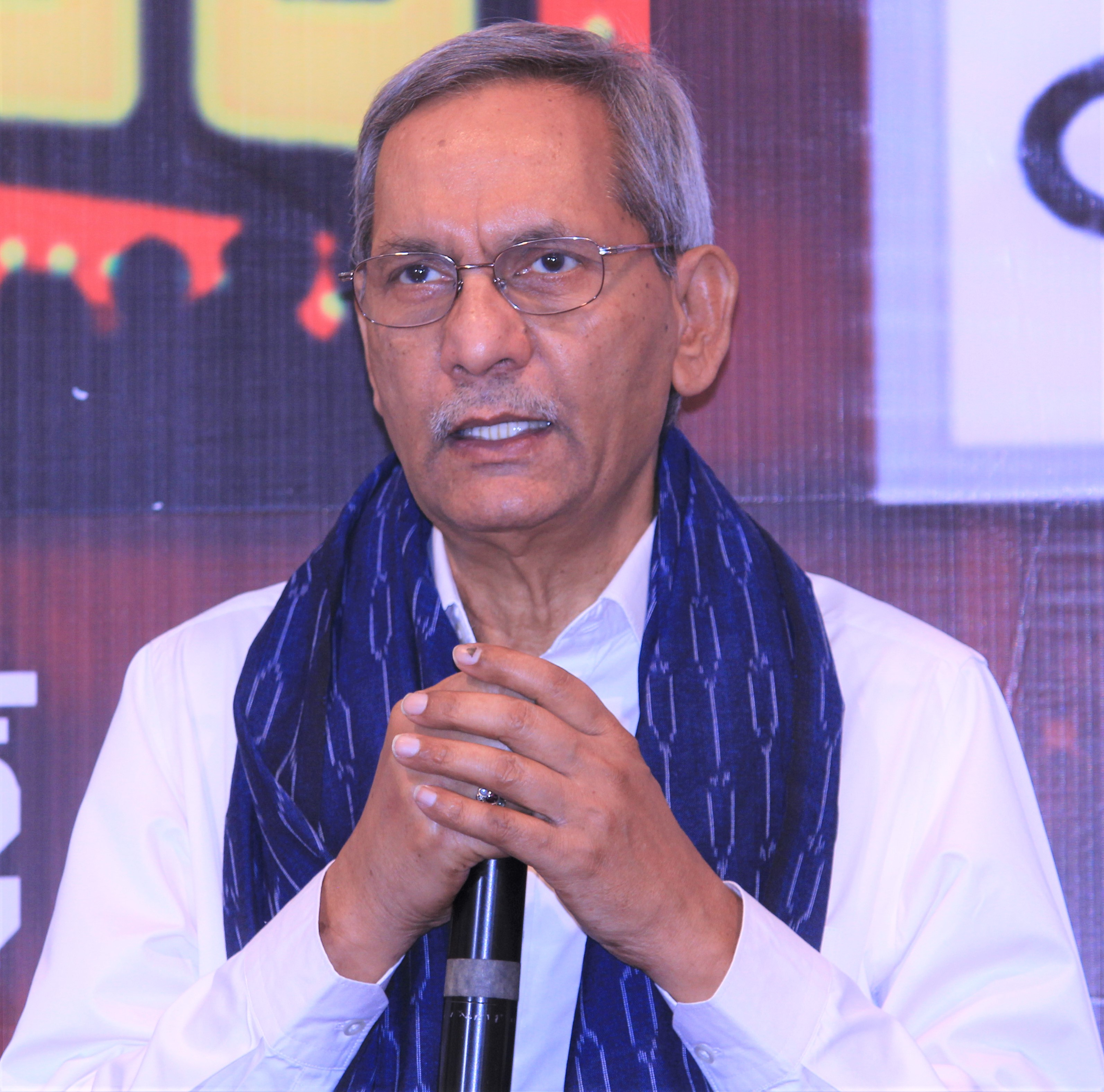
Kondubhatla Ramachandra Murthy

Kondubhatla Ramachandra Murthy (Telugu: కొండుభట్ల రామచంద్రమూర్తి; born 20 May 1948) is an Indian journalist. As of 2019, he is a public policy advisor to the Government of Andhra Pradesh, advising on policies relating to health, education, Dalit and tribal welfare. He was the editorial director for Sakshi Media Group and previously was MD and CEO of Hyderabad Media House Ltd which runs HMTV, a Telugu news TV channel and The Hans India, an English daily paper. He was also a chief editor of both HMTV and The Hans India.
