= Devulapalle =

- Village
- Interactive map of Devulapalle
- Location in Andhra Pradesh, India Devulapalle (India)
- Coordinates: 17.0689°N 81.2557°E
- Country: India
- State: Andhra Pradesh
- District: Eluru

Population (2011)
  - Total: 2,357

Languages
  - Official: Telugu
- Time zone: UTC+5:30 (IST)
- Nearest big city: Vijayawada

Devulapalle is a popular village situated in Eluru district. The nearest railway station is Eluru located at a distance of more than 10 Km.

== Demographics ==
As of 2011 Census of India, Devulapalle had a population of 2357. The total population constitute, 1185 males and 1172 females with a sex ratio of 989 females per 1000 males. 231 children are in the age group of 0–6 years, with sex ratio of 878. The average literacy rate stands at 66.04%.
