= Prema Pusthakam =

- Poster
- Directed by: Gollapudi Srinivas; Gollapudi Maruthi Rao
- Written by: Gollapudi Srinivas
- Produced by: Atluri Purnachandra Rao
- Starring: Ajith Kumar; Kanchan
- Music by: Devendran
- Release date: 16 July 1993
- Country: India
- Language: Telugu

Prema Pusthakam (transl. Book of Love) is a 1993 Indian Telugu-language romance film which was partly directed by Gollapudi Srinivas before his death on the set of the film; it was later finished by his father, Gollapudi Maruthi Rao. It stars newcomers Ajith Kumar and Kanchan, with Devendran was the music composer. This film is the first film that Ajith Kumar shot for and is his only Telugu film to date. The film was temporarily put on hold after the director died. The film won three Nandi Awards.

== Plot ==
Sreekar and Charitra are college students. They are expelled from their college. They find themselves homeless and unemployed. They decide to marry. On the eve of the marriage, a rich old man tries to disrobe Charitra with the intention of raping her. Charitra prevents him from disrobing and raping her. She stabs him to death with a thick piece of glass. The next day, she marries Sreekar. Seconds after the wedding, police enter the marriage hall and arrest Charitra on charges of murdering the old man. Even after this incident, Sreekar neither hates her nor does he abandon her. The court finds Charitra guilty of murder and sentences her.

== Cast ==
- Ajith Kumar as Sreekar (credited as Sreekar)
- Kanchan as Charitra
- Thangana
- Lakshmipriya
- Sohini
- Deepika
- Swati
- P. L. Narayana as Charitra's father
- Maharshi Raghava
- Tanikella Bharani as priest
- Gollapudi Maruthi Rao
- Balu
- Misro
- Kashi Viswanath
- Kallu Chidambaram
- Kumara Raja
- Vizag Prasad
- Rajani Srinivas
- GV Rama
- Gauri Shankar
- Vidyasagar
- Murali Mohan
- Giri Babu as Military officer
- Mallikarjuna Rao as Police officer
- Suthivelu as Police officer
- Sameer as Sreekar's friend (uncredited)

== Production ==
The film was written by Gollapudi Srinivas, son of noted director Gollapudi Maruthi Rao, on the basis of the 1989 Bengali film Aamar Tumi. In early 1992 and Ajith Kumar was signed on to feature in the lead role. Shooting for the film began on 2 August 1992. However, during the ninth day of the shoot, the debutant director died after succumbing to injuries suffered during a water accident on sets in Vizag, Andhra Pradesh. The death led to creation of the Gollapudi Srinivas Award, with the director's father Gollapudi Maruthi Rao giving the award to promising debutant directors to continue his son's legacy. The film was duly delayed and later completed by Srinivas's father and only released in 1993.

== Soundtrack ==
The songs were composed by Devendran.

Track listing
No.	Title	Lyrics	Singer(s)	Length
1.	"Anukunnadhi"		S. P. Balasubrahmanyam	2:58
2.	"Geluchuko"		S. P. Balasubrahmanyam, K. S. Chithra	3:58
3.	"Kaliki Seethammaku"		K. S. Chithra, S. P. Balasubrahmanyam	3:08
4.	"Manugade Madhuramu"		K. S. Chithra, S. P. Balasubrahmanyam
5.	"Modhalainadhi Mana"	Vennelakanti	S. P. Balasubrahmanyam, K. S. Chithra	3:13
6.	"Moodu Nelalaega"		S. P. Balasubrahmanyam, K. S. Chithra	3:15
7.	"Poornamadham"	Veturi	K. S. Chithra, S. P. Balasubrahmanyam
8.	"Thiyagga Puttadhae"		S. P. Balasubrahmanyam
9.	"Visakha Beach Lo"	Veturi	S. P. Balasubrahmanyam, K. S. Chithra	4:18

== Release and reception ==
The film has been described by commentators as an "eminently forgettable" debut for Ajith Kumar, due to the problems faced during production.

The film was reviewed by Zamin Ryot. It was later dubbed and released in Tamil as Kadhal Puthagam in 1997. A reviewer of the dubbed version wrote "The screenplay could have been better as the story flow seems to be discontinuous at times. In spite of this, the director has shown some flashes of talent in some scenes, especially scenes involving Ajit and Kanchan".

== Awards ==
Nandi Awards

- Best Screenplay Writer - Gollapudi Maruthi Rao
- Best Costume Designer - Manohar Reddy
- Special Jury Award - Kanchan
