= Pasham Yadagiri =

Indian activist

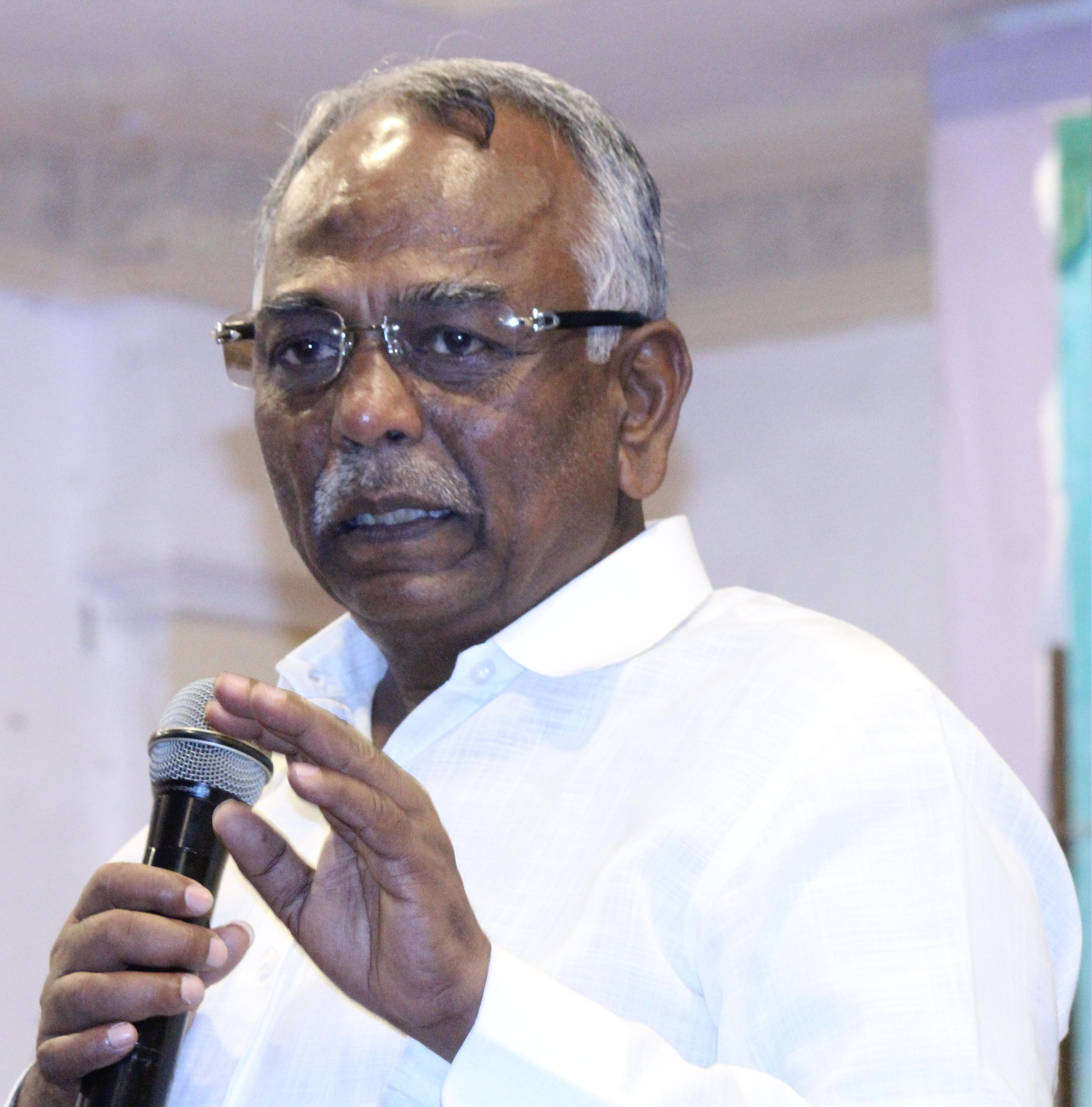
- Born: Hyderabad State
- Occupation: Journalist
- Known for: Telangana agitation

Pasham Yadagiri is a journalist, activist and Convenor of the Telangana Aikya Karyacharana Samiti. He fought in the 1969 Telangana agitation. He is also considered as one of the most senior journalist and advisor to journalist schools. He has also worked with many newspapers namely 'Udayam'. He is a political analyst and philosopher.

He was awarded with a cash award of ₹1 crore at Telangana Formation Day celebrations in Parade Grounds, Secunderabad on 2 June 2025 for his contributions to the Telangana movement.

== Life ==
He was born in Hyderabad State and went to an Urdu medium school.

He played a prominent role in Telangana movement. Before the political parties took the idea of bifurcation as their policy, Pasham Yadagiri along with others were demanding for a separate state in 1990's itself.

He is also a founder member of Hyderabad Zindabad. He has been organizing, attending public meetings to activate the real form of development. His ideas and thinking on Telangana and other political beliefs has marked the generations to rethink and revise the thoughts.

He is an expert in toponymy of Hyderabad locations. Telangana advises political leaders and journalists on varied issues relating to rural development, agrarian crisis, economy, politics and current affairs.
