= Devulapalli Amar =

Indian journalist

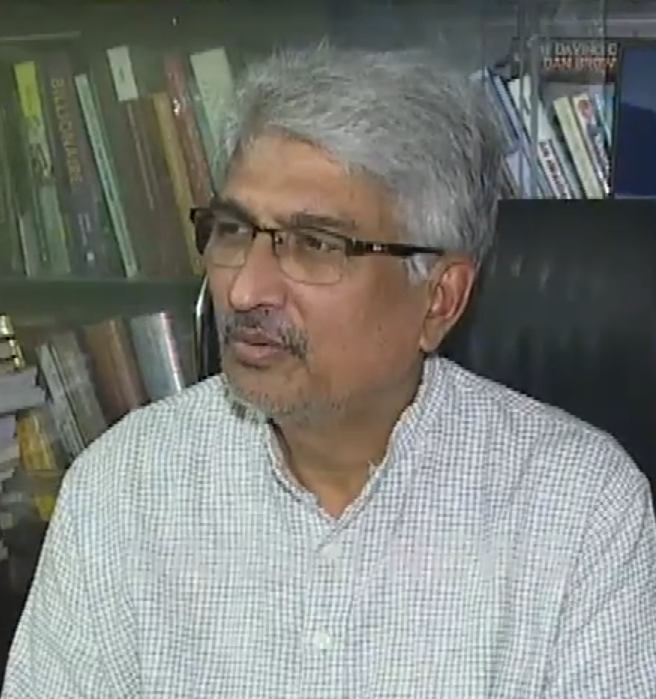
- Born: 15 August 1957 (age 68)
- Occupations: Journalist, writer

Devulapalli Amar (born 15 August 1957) is an Indian journalist.

== Early life ==
Devulapalli Amar was born to D. Madanmohan Rao and Saraswathi. He earned his B.A. and Bachelors in Journalism.

== Career ==
Devulapalli Amar started his career as a correspondent for Prajatantra in 1975.

He worked with Andhra Prabha where he served as a staff correspondent and rose to the position of assistant editor.

He worked with Eenadu, Udayam, Andhra Bhoomi, at Indian Express. He was elected twice as the president of Andhra Pradesh Union of Working Journalists. He was Chairman of Andhra Pradesh Press Academy.

At present he is All India General Secretary and working in Sakshi, a Telugu news channel as a programme presenter.

He is one of the most senior journalists in Telangana.

He also writes an article in the Sakshi newspaper every Wednesday. Recently he released a book named "Dateline Hyderabad" with all his collected articles.
