= Alamanda, Vizianagaram district =

Alamanda
- village
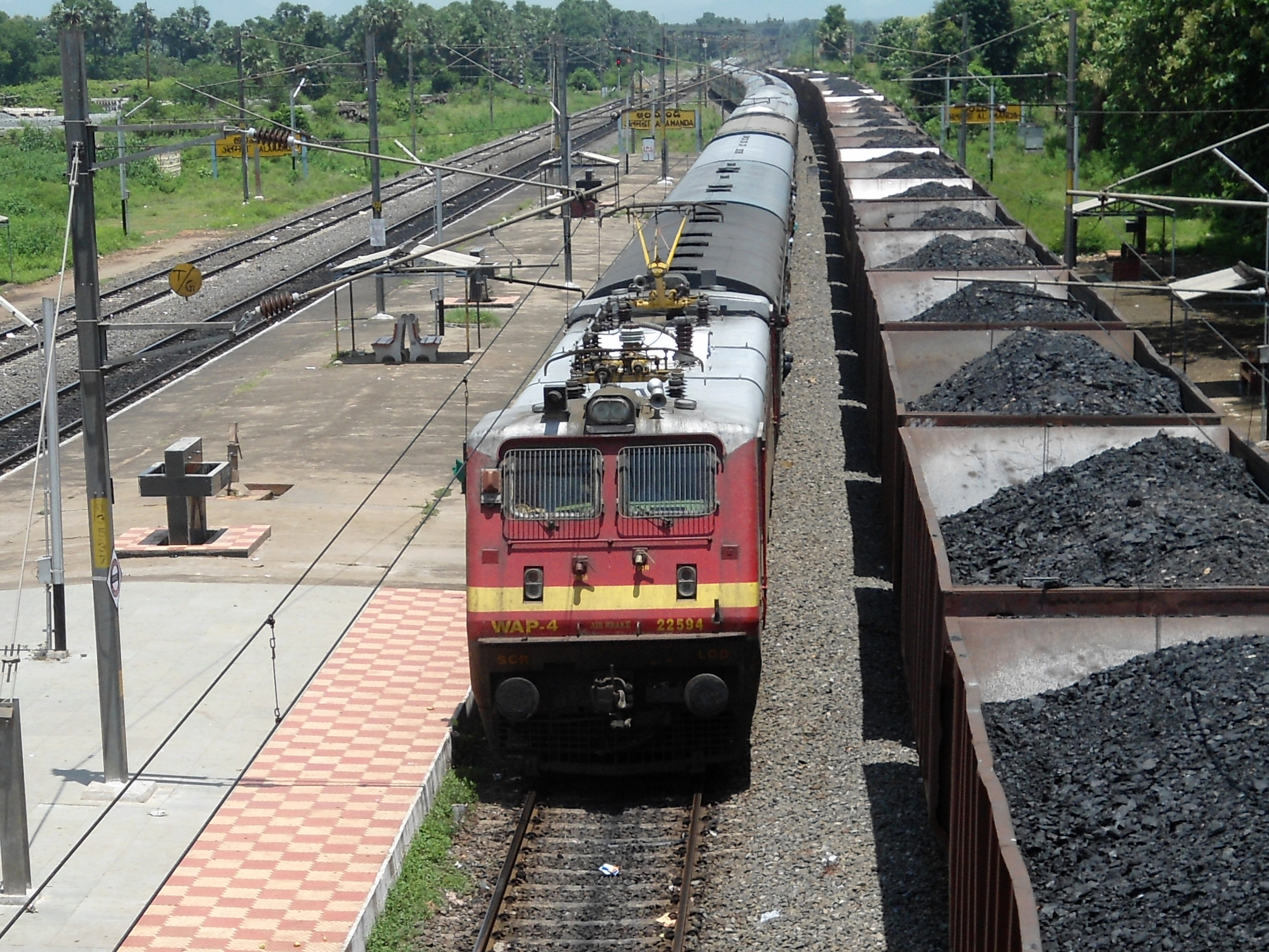
- Prashanti Express at Alamanda Train station
- Interactive map of Alamanda
- Location in Andhra Pradesh, India Alamanda (India)
- Coordinates: 17.9833°N 83.2333°E
- Country: India
- State: Andhra Pradesh
- District: Vizianagaram
- Elevation: 60 m (200 ft)

Languages
  - Official: Telugu
- Time zone: UTC+5:30 (IST)
- PIN: 535 240
- Vehicle registration: AP-35

Alamanda is a village panchayat in Jami mandal of Vizianagaram district, Andhra Pradesh, India. There is a railway station in Alamanda in Waltair division of East Coast Railway, Indian Railways.

== Demographics ==
As of 2001 census, the village demographics are as follows:

- Total Population - 6,563 in 1,397 households.
- Male Population - 3,346
- Female Population - 3,217
- Children under 6 years of age - 750 (Boys - 375 and Girls - 375)
- Total Literates - 2,967

== Popular culture ==
Alamanda Railway station was shown in the movie Narasimha NaiDu.
