= Filmfare Award for Best Director – Tamil =

Annual film award in India

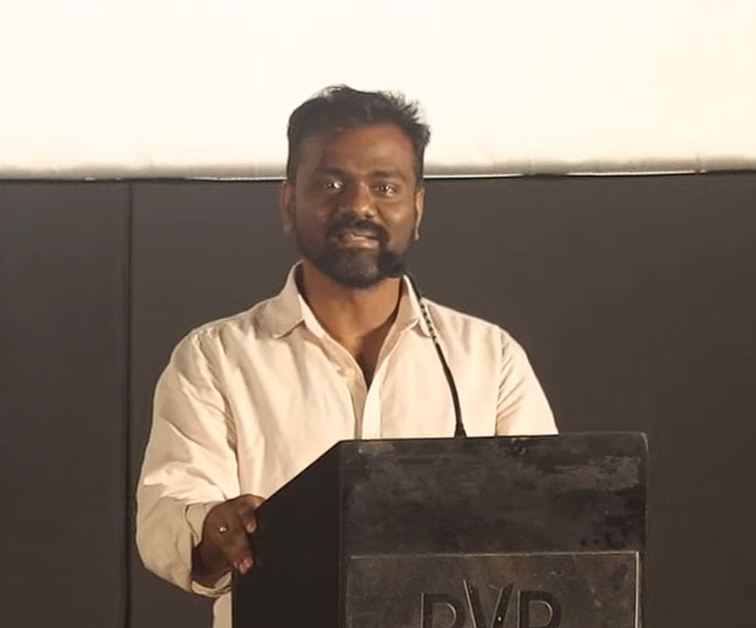
- The 2024 recipients: PS Vinothraj and Rajkumar Periasamy
- Awarded for: Best Director in Tamil films
- Country: India
- Presented by: Filmfare
- First award: P. Madhavan for Gnana Oli (1972)
- Currently held by: PS Vinothraj for Kottukkaali and Rajkumar Periasamy for Amaran (2024)
- Website: http://filmfareawards.indiatimes.com/

The Filmfare Award for Best Film – Tamil is given by the Filmfare magazine as part of its annual Filmfare Awards South for Tamil (Kollywood) films. The awards were extended to "Best Director" in 1972.

== Superlatives ==
Superlative	Director	Record
Most wins	K. Balachander	7
Most nominations	K. Balachander	18
Most nominations without a win	Vikraman	7
Most consecutive nominations	K. Balachander	6
Most consecutive nominations	Bharathiraja	6
Most consecutive wins	K. Balachander	2
Most consecutive wins	S. P. Muthuraman	2
Most consecutive wins	Mani Ratnam	2
Most consecutive wins	S. Shankar	2
Most consecutive wins	Cheran	2
Oldest winner	K. Balachander	63
Oldest nominee	Balu Mahendra	74

- K. Balachander has won the award a record seven times and won twice in a row on two separate occasions (1974–1975 and 1980–1981). Mani Ratnam has received the award 6 times, which is the second most wins. Cheran has received the award 4 times.
- Sudha Kongara was the first of two women to have won this award for Irudhi Suttru in 2016, the second being Gayathri of Pushkar–Gayathri duo for Vikram Vedha in 2017. The only other female director to have been nominated is Suhasini for Indira.
- S. Shankar remains the only director to have won the award for his first two films consecutively, Gentleman (1993) and Kaadhalan (1994).
- S. Shankar, Cheran, Ameer Sultan, Bala, and Sasikumar are the four directors who have received the award for their debut film.
- K. Balachander has the most nominations with 18, followed by Mani Ratnam with 15.

== Multiple nominations ==
- 18 nominations: K. Balachander
- 15 nominations: Mani Ratnam
- 13 nominations: Bharathiraja
- 9 nominations: S. Shankar
- 7 nominations: S. P. Muthuraman, Balu Mahendra, Vikraman
- 6 nominations: K. S. Ravikumar, A. R. Murugadoss
- 5 nominations: Vetrimaaran, Gautham Menon, Singeetam Srinivasa Rao, K. Bhagyaraj, Cheran, Bala
- 4 nominations: Selvaraghavan
- 3 nominations: Fazil, Mohan Raja, Vasanthabalan, P. Vasu, Mahendran, Pa. Ranjith, Mari Selvaraj
- 2 nominations: P. Madhavan, C. V. Sridhar, A. C. Tirulokchandar, R. Sundarrajan, K. V. Anand, Manivannan, Atlee, Ram Kumar, Ameer Sultan, Prabhu Solomon, Hari, A. L. Vijay, Kamal Haasan, Balaji Sakthivel, Mysskin, Priyadarshan, Rajiv Menon, R. Parthiban, Sundar. C, A. Jagannathan, Sudha Kongara, Madonne Ashwin

== Multiple wins ==
- 7 wins: K. Balachander
- 6 wins: Mani Ratnam
- 4 wins: Cheran
- 3 wins: S. Shankar, Bala
- 2 wins: Bharathiraja, S. P. Muthuraman, Vasanthabalan, Balu Mahendra, Sudha Kongara

== Winners ==
Year	Director	Film	Ref(s).
1972	P. Madhavan	Gnana Oli	
1973	A. C. Tirulokchandar	Bharatha Vilas	
1974	K. Balachander	Aval Oru Thodar Kathai	
1975	K. Balachander	Apoorva Raagangal	
1976	S. P. Muthuraman	Oru Oodhappu Kan Simittugiradhu	
1977	S. P. Muthuraman	Bhuvana Oru Kelvi Kuri	
1978	Bharathiraja	Sigappu Rojakkal	
1979	Mahendran	Uthiripookkal	
1980	K. Balachander	Varumayin Niram Sivappu	
1981	K. Balachander	Thanneer Thanneer	
1982	Balu Mahendra	Moondram Pirai	
1983	A. Jagannathan	Vellai Roja	
1984	K. Balachander	Achamillai Achamillai	
1985	Fazel	Poove Poochudava	
1986	Mani Ratnam	Mouna Raagam	
1987	Bharathiraja	Vedham Puthithu	
1988	Balu Mahendra	Veedu	
1989	K.Balachander	Pudhu Pudhu Arthangal	
1990	Mani Ratnam	Anjali	
1991	Mani Ratnam	Thalapathi	
1992	K.Balachander	Vaaname Ellai	
1993	Shankar	Gentleman	
1994	Shankar	Kaadhalan	
1995	Mani Ratnam	Bombay	
1996	Agathiyan	Kadhal Kottai	
1997	Cheran	Bharathi Kannamma	
1998	Cheran	Desiya Geetham	
1999	Bala	Sethu	
2000	Rajiv Menon	Kandukondain Kandukondain	
2001	Cheran	Pandavar Bhoomi	
2002	Mani Ratnam	Kannathil Muthamittal	
2003	Bala	Pithamagan	
2004	Cheran	Autograph	
2005	Shankar	Anniyan	
2006	Vasanthabalan	Veyil	
2007	Ameer Sultan	Paruthiveeran	
2008	Sasikumar	Subramaniyapuram	
2009	Priyadarshan	Kanchivaram	
2010	Vasanthabalan	Angadi Theru	
2011	Vetrimaaran	Aadukalam	
2012	Balaji Sakthivel	Vazhakku Enn 18/9	
2013	Bala	Paradesi	
2014	A. R. Murugadoss	Kaththi	
2015	Mohan Raja	Thani Oruvan	
2016	Sudha Kongara	Irudhi Suttru	
2017	Pushkar–Gayathri	Vikram Vedha	
2018	Ram Kumar	Ratsasan	
2019	AWARDS FUNCTION WAS SUSPENDED DUE TO COVID-19 PANDEMIC		
2020–2021	Sudha Kongara	Soorarai Pottru	
2022	Mani Ratnam	Ponniyin Selvan: I	
2023	S. U. Arun Kumar	Chithha	
2024	PS Vinothraj	Kottukkaali	
2024	Rajkumar Periasamy	Amaran	

== Nominations ==
=== 1970s ===
- 1972 – P. Madhavan – Pattikada Pattanama
- 1973 – A. C. Tirulokchandar – Bharatha Vilas
- 1974 – K. Balachander – Aval Oru Thodar Kathai
  - C. V. Sridhar – Urimai Kural
  - Singeetam Srinivasa Rao – Dikkatra Parvathi
- 1975 – K. Balachander – Apoorva Raagangal
  - A. C. Tirulokchandar – Anbe Aaruyire
  - A. Jagannathan – Idhayakkani
- 1976 – S. P. Muthuraman – Oru Oodhappu Kan Simittugiradhu
  - Devaraj–Mohan – Annakili
  - K. Balachander – Moondru Mudichu
  - P. Madhavan – Chitra Pournami
  - S. P. Muthuraman – Thunive Thunai
- 1977 – S. P. Muthuraman – Bhuvana Oru Kelvi Kuri
  - Bhimsingh – Sila Nerangalil Sila Manithargal
  - K. Balachander – Avargal
  - Bharathiraja – 16 Vayathinile
  - R. Thyagarajan – Aattukara Alamelu
- 1978 – Bharathiraja – Sigappu Rojakkal
  - C. Rudhraiya – Aval Appadithan
  - C. V. Sridhar – Ilamai Oonjal Aadukirathu
  - Mahendran – Mullum Malarum
  - S. P. Muthuraman – Priya
- 1979 – Mahendran – Uthiri Pookkal
  - Balu Mahendra – Azhiyatha Kolangal
  - Bharathiraja – Puthiya Vaarpugal
  - Durai – Pasi
  - K. Balachander – Ninaithale Inikkum

=== 1980s ===
- 1980 – K. Balachander – Varumayin Niram Sigappu
  - K. Vijayan – Vandichakkaram
  - Mahendran – Nenjathai Killathe
  - R. Krishnamurthy – Billa
  - S. P. Muthuraman – Murattu Kaalai
- 1981 – K. Balachander – Thaneer Thaneer
  - Bharathiraja – Alaigal Oivathillai
  - K. Bhagyaraj – Andha 7 Naatkal
- 1982 – Balu Mahendra – Moondram Pirai
  - K. Balachander – Agni Sakshi
  - Manivannan – Gopurangal Saivathillai
  - R. Sundarrajan – Payanangal Mudivathillai
  - S. P. Muthuraman – Engeyo Ketta Kural
- 1983 – A. Jagannathan – Vellai Roja
  - Bharathiraja – Man Vasanai
  - C. V. Sridhar – Oru Odai Nadhiyagirathu
  - K. Bhagyaraj – Mundhanai Mudichu
  - T. Rajendar – Thangaikkor Geetham
- 1984 – K. Balachander – Achamillai Achamillai
  - Bharathiraja – Pudhumai Penn
  - Manivannan – Nooravathu Naal
  - R. C. Sakthi – Sirai
  - S. P. Muthuraman – Nallavanukku Nallavan
- 1985 – Fazil – Poove Poochudava
  - K. Balachander – Sindhu Bhairavi
  - K. Bhagyaraj – Chinna Veedu
  - Bharathiraja – Muthal Mariyathai
  - Bharathiraja – Oru Kaidhiyin Diary
- 1986 – Mani Ratnam – Mouna Ragam
  - Bharathiraja – Kadalora Kavithaigal
  - K. Balachander – Punnagai Mannan
  - R. Sundarrajan – Amman Kovil Kizhakale
  - Visu – Samsaram Adhu Minsaram
- 1987 – Bharathiraja – Vedham Pudhithu
  - Balu Mahendra – Rettai Vaal Kuruvi
  - K. Bhagyaraj – Enga Chinna Rasa
  - Mani Ratnam – Nayakan
  - S. A. Chandrasekhar – Neethikku Thandanai
- 1988 – Balu Mahendra – Veedu
  - K. Balachander – Unnal Mudiyum Thambi
  - Fazil – En Bommukutty Ammavukku
  - Mani Ratnam – Agni Natchathiram
  - Suresh Krissna – Sathya
- 1989 – K. Balachander – Pudhu Pudhu Arthangal
  - Fazil – Varusham Padhinaaru
  - K. Bhagyaraj – Aararo Aariraro
  - R. Parthiban – Pudhea Paadhai
  - Singeetham Srinivasa Rao – Apoorva Sagodharargal

=== 1990s ===
- 1990 – Mani Ratnam – Anjali
  - K. Balachander – Oru Veedu Iru Vaasal
  - Singeetham Srinivasa Rao – Michael Madana Kama Rajan
  - Vasanth – Keladi Kanmani
  - Vikraman – Pudhu Vasantham
- 1991 – Mani Ratnam – Thalapathi
  - K. Balachander – Azhagan
  - P. Vasu – Chinna Thambi
  - Priyadarshan – Gopura Vasalile
  - R. K. Selvamani – Captain Prabhakaran
- 1992 – K. Balachander – Vaaname Ellai
  - Balu Mahendra – Vanna Vanna Pookkal
  - Bharathan – Thevar Magan
  - Mani Ratnam – Roja
  - R. V. Udayakumar – Chinna Gounder
- 1993 – S. Shankar – Gentleman
  - Balu Mahendra – Marupadiyum
  - Bharathiraja – Kizhakku Cheemayile
  - K. Balachander – Jathi Malli
  - Vikraman – Gokulam
- 1994 – S. Shankar – Kaadhalan
  - Bharathiraja – Karuthamma
  - K. S. Ravikumar – Nattamai
  - Santhana Bharathi – Mahanadhi
  - Singeetham Srinivasa Rao – Magalir Mattum
- 1995 – Mani Ratnam – Bombay
  - Balu Mahendra – Sathi Leelavathi
  - Bharathiraja – Anthimanthaarai
  - I. V. Sasi – Kolangal
  - Suhasini Maniratnam – Indira
- 1996 – Agathiyan – Kadhal Kottai
  - K. Balachander – Kalki
  - S. Shankar – Indian
  - Sundar C – Ullathai Allitha
  - Vikraman – Poove Unakkaga
- 1997 – Cheran – Bharathi Kannamma
  - Mani Ratnam – Iruvar
  - Rajeev Menon – Minsara Kanavu
  - Sundar C – Arunachalam
  - Vikraman – Suryavamsam
- 1998 – Cheran – Desiya Geetham
  - K. S. Ravikumar – Natpukkaga
  - S. Shankar – Jeans
  - Singeetham Srinivasa Rao – Kadhala Kadhala
  - Vikraman – Unnidathil Ennai Koduthen
- 1999 – Bala – Sethu
  - Ezhil – Thullatha Manamum Thullum
  - K. S. Ravikumar – Padayappa
  - R. Parthiban – House Full
  - S. Shankar – Mudhalvan

=== 2000s ===
- 2000 – Rajeev Menon – Kandukondain Kandukondain
  - Kamal Haasan – Hey Ram
  - Mani Ratnam – Alaipayuthey
  - S. J. Suryah – Kushi
  - Vikraman – Vaanathaipola
- 2001 – Cheran – Pandavar Bhoomi
  - Bala – Nandhaa
  - N. Linguswamy – Aanandham
  - Vinayan – Kasi
- 2002 – Mani Ratnam – Kannathil Muthamittal
  - A. R. Murugadoss – Ramanaa
  - K. S. Ravikumar – Panchatanthiram
  - Thangar Bachchan – Azhagi
  - Vikraman – Unnai Ninaithu
- 2003 – Bala – Pithamagan
  - Dharani – Dhool
  - Gautham Vasudev Menon – Kaaka Kaaka
  - Hari – Saamy
  - Selvaraghavan – Kadhal Kondain
- 2004 – Cheran – Autograph
  - Balaji Sakthivel – Kaadhal
  - Mani Ratnam – Aayutha Ezhuthu
  - Mohan Raja – M. Kumaran S/O Mahalakshmi
  - Selvaraghavan – 7G Rainbow Colony
- 2005 – S. Shankar – Anniyan
  - A. R. Murugadoss – Ghajini
  - Ameer Sultan – Raam
  - Cheran – Thavamai Thavamirundhu
  - P. Vasu – Chandramukhi
- 2006 – Vasanthabalan – Veyyil
  - K. S. Ravikumar – Varalaru
  - Mysskin – Chithiram Pesuthadi
  - S. P. Jananathan – E
  - Selvaraghavan – Pudhupettai
- 2007 – Ameer Sultan – Paruthiveeran
  - Prabhu Deva – Pokkiri
  - Radha Mohan – Mozhi
  - S. Shankar – Sivaji
  - Vetrimaaran – Polladhavan
- 2008 – Sasikumar – Subramaniyapuram
  - Gautham Vasudev Menon – Vaaranam Aayiram
  - K. S. Ravikumar – Dasavathaaram
  - M. Raja – Santosh Subramaniam
  - Mithran Jawahar – Yaaradi Nee Mohini
  - Myshkin – Anjathe
- 2009 – Priyadarshan – Kanchivaram
  - Bala – Naan Kadavul
  - K. V. Anand – Ayan
  - Pandiraj – Pasanga
  - Samuthirakani – Naadodigal
  - Suseenthiran – Vennila Kabadi Kuzhu

=== 2010s ===
- 2010 – Vasanthabalan – Angaadi Theru
  - A. L. Vijay – Madrasapattinam
  - Gautham Vasudev Menon – Vinnaithaandi Varuvaayaa
  - Prabu Solomon – Mynaa
  - Selvaraghavan – Aayirathil Oruvan
  - Shankar – Enthiran
- 2011 – Vetrimaaran – Aadukalam
  - A. L. Vijay – Deiva Thirumagal
  - A. R. Murugadoss – 7 Aum Arivu
  - K. V. Anand – Ko
  - Venkat Prabhu – Mankatha
- 2012 – Balaji Sakthivel – Vazhakku Enn 18/9
  - A. R. Murugadoss – Thuppakki
  - Prabu Solomon – Kumki
  - S. R. Prabhakaran – Sundarapandian
  - Seenu Ramasamy – Neerparavai
- 2013 – Bala for Paradesi
  - Balu Mahendra – Thalaimuraigal
  - G. N. R. Kumaravelan – Haridas
  - Hari – Singam 2
  - Kamal Haasan – Vishwaroopam
  - Ram – Thanga Meengal
- 2014 – A. R. Murugadoss – Kaththi
  - Pa. Ranjith – Madras
  - Ram Kumar – Mundasupatti
  - Vasanthabalan – Kaaviya Thalaivan
  - Velraj – Velaiyilla Pattathari
- 2015 – Mohan Raja for Thani Oruvan
  - Jithu Joseph – Papanasam
  - M. Manikandan – Kaaka Muttai
  - Mani Ratnam – OK Kanmani
  - Roshan Andrews – 36 Vayadhinile
  - Shankar – I
- 2016 – Sudha Kongara – Irudhi Suttru
  - Atlee – Theri
  - Gautham Vasudev Menon – Achcham Yenbadhu Madamaiyada
  - Pa. Ranjith – Kabali
  - Raju Murugan – Joker
  - Vetrimaran – Visaranai
- 2017 – Pushkar-Gayathri – Vikram Vedha
  - Arun Prabu Purushothaman – Aruvi
  - Atlee – Mersal
  - Dhanush – Power Paandi
  - Gopi Nainar – Aramm
  - H. Vinoth – Theeran Adhigaram Ondru
- 2018 – Ram Kumar – Ratsasan
  - A. R. Murugadoss – Sarkar
  - C. Premkumar – 96
  - Mani Ratnam – Chekka Chivantha Vaanam
  - Mari Selvaraj – Pariyerum Perumal
  - Vetrimaran – Vada Chennai

=== 2020s ===
- 2020–2021 – Sudha Kongara – Soorarai Potru
  - Desingh Periyasamy – Kannum Kannum Kollaiyadithaal
  - Madonne Ashwin – Mandela
  - Mari Selvaraj – Karnan
  - P. Virumandi – Ka Pae Ranasingam
  - Pa. Ranjith – Sarpatta Parambarai
  - T. J. Gnanavel – Jai Bhim
- 2022 – Mani Ratnam – Ponniyin Selvan: I
  - Lokesh Kanagaraj – Vikram
  - Gautham Ramachandran – Gargi
  - M. Manikandan – Kadaisi Vivasayi
  - Gautham Menon – Vendhu Thanindhathu Kaadu
  - R. Madhavan – Rocketry: The Nambi Effect
  - R. Parthiban – Iravin Nizhal
- 2023 – S. U. Arun Kumar – Chiththa
  - Madonne Ashwin – Maaveeran
  - Mani Ratnam – Ponniyin Selvan: II
  - Mari Selvaraj – Maamannan
  - Vetrimaaran – Viduthalai Part 1
- 2024 – PS Vinothraj – Kottukkaali and Rajkumar Periasamy – Amaran
  - C. Prem Kumar – Meiyazhagan
  - Mari Selvaraj – Vaazhai
  - Nithilan Saminathan – Maharaja
  - Pa. Ranjith – Thangalaan
