= Moodu Pani =

1980 film by Balu Mahendra

- Theatrical release poster
- Directed by: Balu Mahendra
- Screenplay by: Balu Mahendra
- Based on: Idhuvum Oru Viduthalai Thaan by Rajendra Kumar; The Collector by John Fowles
- Starring: Shoba Mahendra; Pratap
- Cinematography: Balu Mahendra
- Edited by: D. Vasu
- Music by: Ilaiyaraaja
- Production company: Raja Cine Arts
- Release date: 6 November 1980
- Running time: 131 minutes
- Country: India
- Language: Tamil

Moodu Pani (English: The Mist) is a 1980 Indian Tamil-language psychological thriller film written, directed and filmed by Balu Mahendra. Starring his then wife Shoba and Pratap, with N. Viswanathan, Gandhimathi, Mohan and Bhanu Chander in supporting roles, it is based on two novels: Idhuvum Oru Viduthalai Thaan (1978) by Rajendra Kumar, and The Collector (1963) by John Fowles. The film follows Chandru (Pratap), who has a strong hatred towards prostitutes and would kill any such woman he encounters. He falls in love with Rekha (Shoba) and believes marrying her will end his psychological distress.

Moodu Pani was the third directorial venture of Mahendra and his second in Tamil after Azhiyatha Kolangal (1979). It also marked Mohan's debut in Tamil cinema, and the last film Shoba acted in before her death. Principal photography took place between January and April 1980, mostly in Udupi, Bangalore and Ooty. The film's similarities to Alfred Hitchcock's film Psycho (1960) have been widely discussed. The soundtrack was composed by Ilaiyaraaja, this being his 100th film, and his brother Gangai Amaran was the main lyricist.

Moodu Pani was released on 6 November 1980, during the Diwali holiday frame. The film received critical acclaim, with particular praise for the performances of Pratap and Shoba, and Ilaiyaraaja's music; the song "Yen Iniya Pon Nilavae" attained immense popularity. It was a commercial success, running for over 200 days in theatres, and responsible for a resurgence of the thriller genre in Tamil cinema at that point. Despite the film propelling Pratap to stardom, it also led to him being typecast in similar roles.

== Plot ==
Chandru, a wealthy businessman in Bangalore, has an uncontrollable hatred for prostitutes, a consequence of having watched his mother being beaten by his father frequently after he spent a night with a prostitute. Raghunath, a police inspector, knows Chandru and his mother. His son Ravi is engaged to Rekha, the daughter of his friend.

Haunted by memories of the prostitute, Chandru lures two prostitutes to lonely places and murders them as he sees that woman in each of them. Rekha's friend Pallavi comes to Bangalore to meet her, and telephones her for her residential address. The conversation is overheard by the Madam of a brothel, who misleads Pallavi. Instead of being taken to Rekha's house, Pallavi is taken to the brothel and forced into prostitution. Rekha and Raghunath search for Pallavi. Chandru comes to the same brothel, takes Pallavi in his car and later kills her. Rekha learns of Pallavi's murder through Raghunath; neither are aware that Chandru is the murderer.

Still photographer Bhaskar takes pictures of his lover with a motorbike in the background. Chandru, who had come on that motorbike, had parked it there and murdered a prostitute who enticed him near the same location, then rode away. Reading about the murder in a newspaper, Bhaskar shows Raghunath the pictures with the murderer's motorbike in the background. Raghunath investigates and learns that the owner has lent it to his friend.

Troubled by his constant anger, Chandru meets with a psychiatrist who advises him to marry soon so that he will no longer be lonely, saying the loneliness is leading him to dwell on his past and indulge in extreme acts. Chandru meets Rekha at a theatre and then at a book stall. He proposes to Rekha and even pleads with her to marry him. Surprised at his extreme pleading, Rekha politely tells him that she loves someone else (Ravi), and their marriage is already fixed. Raghunath is startled when Rekha tells him about Chandru's marriage proposal.

Chandru keeps following Rekha; one day he makes her unconscious and takes her away to a bungalow in Ooty. When she regains consciousness, he tells her that he had purchased this house in Ooty only for her, and again asks her to marry him. When Rekha refuses and begs to be freed, he asks her to stay for at least a month so that she can understand him better, and then reduces it to a week. He makes all the arrangements to ensure that she cannot escape. Rekha later slams Chandru with a spade and runs away. He manages to catch and imprison her in the garage of his house, but is hospitalised for his injury.

Raghunath visits Chandru's office for an enquiry and learns that he has gone to Ooty. He also meets Chandru's psychiatrist and learns about his hatred for prostitutes. He immediately connects this with the recent news of the prostitutes murdered in the city. Raghunath visits Chandru's house and, hidden in the garage, he finds the motorbike photographed by Bhaskar. With his suspicions growing stronger, he arrives in Ooty to meet Chandru and visits the police station, where he finds Chandru's car. The area's inspector tells Raghunath that an unknown person came in the car to the hospital and was admitted; the car was brought to the police station for safety. Raghunath visits the hospital, but finds that Chandru has left. Raghunath is joined by Ravi, and both rush to Chandru's house.

Meanwhile, Rekha escapes from the garage and enters the room where Chandru earlier claimed his mother stays. However, she finds only a skeleton and is cornered by Chandru, who tries to assault her. Ravi and Raghunath hear Rekha screaming and rush to the room. Raghunath subdues Chandru, who collapses and reveals that the skeleton is his mother's. Raghunath understands Chandru's love for his mother and his traumatic childhood, which had made him develop a hatred for women with loose morals. Chandru is arrested, while Rekha and Ravi unite.

== Cast ==
- Shoba Mahendra as Rekha
- Pratap as Chandru
- N. Viswanathan as Raghunath
- Gandhimathi as the Madam of the brothel
- Kokila Mohan as Bhaskar
- Master Raja as young Chandru
- K. S. Jayalakshmi as a prostitute
- Vijaychandrika as a prostitute murdered by Chandru

The uncredited cast includes:

- Bhanu Chander as Ravi, Rekha's lover
- Shanthi Williams as Chandru's mother

== Production ==
=== Development ===
After directing and writing two original films: the Kannada film Kokila (1977) and the Tamil film Azhiyatha Kolangal (1979), Balu Mahendra decided that his third directorial venture be based on a published novel. The film, which would later be titled Moodu Pani, was an adaptation of Idhuvum Oru Viduthalai Thaan, a 1978 Tamil novel by Rajendra Kumar, and The Collector, a 1963 English novel by John Fowles. Mahendra said he based 40% of the film on Idhuvum Oru Viduthalai Thaan, and 60% on The Collector. It was produced by Raja Cine Arts, and edited by D. Vasu. In addition to writing the screenplay and directing the film, Mahendra also served as the cinematographer. The producer of the film is not credited, while K. R. Shanmugham is listed under "Thayarippu Nirvagam" (production administration).

=== Casting ===
Pratap, who previously collaborated with Mahendra on Azhiyatha Kolangal, was cast as Chandru, the mild-mannered and psychopathic serial killer of prostitutes. Mahendra's wife Shoba, who had appeared in both Kokila and Azhiyatha Kolangal, was chosen to play the female lead, with Mahendra claiming the film was "specially made" for her. She was credited in the opening titles as "Shoba Mahendra". Mohan, who later became a leading actor in Tamil cinema, made his debut in Tamil with this film, playing the still photographer Bhaskar. It was his second film under Mahendra's direction after Kokila, and he was credited as "Kokila Mohan".

=== Filming ===
Principal photography for Moodu Pani began in January 1980 and ended in late April, a few days before Shoba's suicide on 1 May, making this the last film she acted in; the last song to be filmed was "Yen Iniya Pon Nilavae". The film was shot primarily in Udupi, Bangalore and Ooty. Mahendra shot the film in hilly places "to capture that misty feel". During the post-production phase, Anuraatha Rajkrishna was chosen to dub Shoba's voice; in preparation, she "spent days on an empty stomach" to get the right speaking style. In making Moodu Pani, Mahendra faced the challenge of distinguishing it from Bharathiraja's Sigappu Rojakkal (1978), which had a similar theme. The final length of the film was 3,848 metres (12,625 ft).

== Themes ==
Although Moodu Pani is officially based on Idhuvum Oru Viduthalai Thaan, it is widely discussed as also having been inspired by Alfred Hitchcock's thriller Psycho (1960). R. Ilangovan of Frontline stated that while Mahendra was inspired by Psycho, his camera work, the "mist-covered nights" of Bangalore and Ooty, and the "weirdness" of the subject made the film "unique". While Idhuvum Oru Viduthalai Thaan and its author were acknowledged in the opening credits of the film, Hitchcock and Psycho were not. According to Sify, there is a strong similarity between Moodu Pani and Psycho as the male leads in both films keep the skeletal remains of their respective mothers, which they continue to communicate with. Chellappa of Hindu Tamil Thisai compared Moodu Pani to Psycho and Sigappu Rojakkal as all three films depict their leads as committing murders to achieve peace of mind. Mahendra's disciple Ameer noted the Oedipal elements between Chandru and his deceased mother.

Mahendra described the film as a suspense thriller, while N. Venkateswaran of The Times of India described it as a psychological thriller. Devika Bai, writing for the New Straits Times, referred to it as a whodunit film. In the 2017 book Indian Horror Cinema, Mithuraaj Dhusiya likened it to a slasher film because of the numerous prostitutes murdered by Chandru. K. Hariharan, director of the L. V. Prasad Film & TV Academy, noted that sexuality and the repression of desire were the dominant motifs in Moodu Pani, expressed through the mysterious misty atmospheres of Ooty where the protagonist confronts their psychological antagonist. He also noted that Moodu Pani, like many of Mahendra's films, borrowed its themes and stylistic devices from French New Wave and New Hollywood styles of filmmaking. Ilangovan noted that Chandru's character, which was depicted as having flashes of wickedness bordering on perversion, was new to Tamil cinema. Crime fiction writer Pattukkottai Prabakar considers Moodu Pani, along with Sigappu Rojakkal and Nooravathu Naal (1984), to explore the personalities and behavioural traits of psychopaths in detail.

== Music ==
The film's soundtrack and score were composed by Ilaiyaraaja, this being his 100th film, and was released under the label EMI Records. It was also the first film in which he collaborated with Mahendra; Ilaiyaraaja would later compose for all of Mahendra's films until Thalaimuraigal (2013), the director's last film before his death in February 2014.

== Release ==
Moodu Pani was released on 6 November 1980, during the Diwali holiday frame. Despite facing competition from other Diwali releases such as Nizhalgal and another Pratap film Varumayin Niram Sivappu, the film was commercially successful, running for over 200 days in theatres.

== Critical reception ==
Moodu Pani received critical acclaim, with critics praising the performances of Pratap and Shoba. Ananda Vikatan, in its review dated 30 November 1980, said that half the dialogues in the film were spoken by the camera, and felt that when there was great cinematography, there was no need for screenplay and dialogues. Soundara Kailasam of Kalki appreciated the film for various aspects, including Shoba's performance, Ilaiyaraaja's music, the fewer songs, and the cinematography. Naagai Dharuman of Anna praised the cinematography, direction, acting and music.

== Legacy ==
"For some reason, despite names like Balu Mahendra and Yesudas being associated with this song, people get reminded of me when they listen to this. I have no idea what I did so well in this song to deserve that. This was also my last song with Shoba. I remember how we looked into the sky just before the line, 'Panneerai Thoovum Mazhai'. Balu Mahendra made me listen to this song for the first time in Chola Sheraton. I learned just then that he got married to Shoba. I told him that this song was so beautiful, that it was a great wedding gift for him from Ilaiyaraaja."

— Pratap, on the song "Yen Iniya Pon Nilavae",

After Sigappu Rojakkal, there was a resurgence of the thriller genre in Tamil cinema, as evidenced by films like Moodu Pani. According to film producer and writer G. Dhananjayan, the film "inspired a generation to take up film-making". M. Suganth of The Times of India stated that Mahendra "changed the landscape of Tamil cinema with his distinctive visuals and eclectic films" such as Moodu Pani. Following Mahendra's death, K. S. Sivakumaran of Ceylon Today described the film as "halfway between artistic and merely entertaining."

Pratap recalled in January 2015 that it was the simultaneous release of Moodu Pani and Varumayin Niram Sivappu that made him a star. However, both Varumayin Niram Sivappu (which depicted Pratap as an eccentric director obsessed with an actress) and Moodu Pani led to him being typecast in similar roles. In 2014, he said, "Both roles caught the public imagination, and I admit I cashed in when I was offered similar stuff. Now, unless I'm offered an unreasonable amount of money, I doubt I'll accept these roles".

Actor Veera stated that he watched Moodu Pani in preparation for his role as a psychopath in the thriller Nadunisi Naaygal (2011). In June 2014 during Ilaiyaraaja's 71st birthday, singers Shweta Mohan and Aalap Raju collaborated to make a video in which they performed some of Ilaiyaraaja's songs as a tribute to him; one song was "Yen Iniya Pon Nilavae". Although no print of Moodu Pani is known to survive, the film is still available on home video.

== In other media ==
In Iruvar Mattum (2006), Azhagu (Abhay) keeps the skeletal remains of his mother and frequently talks to her; Sify compared this plot detail to that of Moodu Pani and Psycho. Malathi Rangarajan of The Hindu, in her review of Julie Ganapathi (2003) a film about a mentally deranged woman (Saritha) who saves an accident victim (Jayaram) from death, nurses him in her own home and also falls in love with him, but holds him captive there, stated that the film had "shades" of Moodu Pani. In Vaaranam Aayiram (2008), when Suriya's character first sees Sameera Reddy's character and falls in love with her, he takes his guitar and performs "Yen Iniya Pon Nilavae". Pratap expressed appreciation for Suriya's version of the song in a May 2015 interview, saying that he had "enjoyed it".

== Bibliography ==
- Dhananjayan, G. (2011). The Best of Tamil Cinema, 1931 to 2010: 1977–2010. Galatta Media. OCLC 733724281.
- Hardy, Phil (1997). The BFI Companion to Crime. British Film Institute. ISBN 978-0-304-33215-1.
- Rajadhyaksha, Ashish; Willemen, Paul (1998) [1994]. Encyclopaedia of Indian Cinema. British Film Institute and Oxford University Press. ISBN 0-19-563579-5.
