= Bhanu Chander =

Indian actor and director

- Born: Madduri Venkatasatya Subramanyeswara Bhanuchander Prasad; Madras, Madras State, India
- Occupations: Film actor Director; Screenwriter; Music Composer
- Years active: 1978–present
- Title: Black belt in Taekwondo
- Parent: Master Venu

Bhanu Chander is an Indian actor and director known for his works predominantly in Telugu and Tamil cinema.

== Career ==
He is known for his association with directors like Balu Mahendra and K. Viswanath in films such as Moodu Pani (1980), Neengal Kettavai (1984), and Nireekshana (1986) apart from acting in Chaitanya Ratham (1987). In 1990, he starred in Sutradharulu, which won the National Film Award for Best Feature Film in Telugu for that year.

== Personal life ==
He is the son of veteran music composer Master Venu. His paternal family hails from Machilipatnam and maternal family hails from Rajahmundry. He was born near Madras. His son Jayanth acted in the film Margazhi 16 (2010).

== Filmography ==
=== Telugu ===
Year	Film	Role	Notes
1978	Mana Voori Pandavulu		
1980	Sivamethina Satyam	Lorry Driver Gopal	
1980	Bebbuli	Shankar	
1980	Mouna Geetham	Dubbing artist for Pratap Pothen	Telugu dubbed version
1981	Adavaalu Meeku Joharulu		
1981	Maro Kurukshetram		
1981	Satyam Sivam		
1982	Edi Dharmam Edi Nyayam?		
1982	Vamsa Gouravam	Ravi	
1982	Tarangini		
1983	Iddaru Khiladilu		
1983	Konte Kodallu		
1983	Simhapuri Simham		
1983	Gudachari No.1	Bujji	
1983	Mukku Pudaka		
1983	Bahudoorapu Batasari		
1984	Kurra Chestalu		
1984	Daku	Dilip	
1984	Railu Dopidi	Suresh	
1984	Swathi		
1984	Yama Dhoothalu		
1984	Merupu Daadi	Bhanu	
1985	Intiko Rudramma	Vijay	
1985	Rechukka	Rechukka	
1985	Ranarangam		
1985	Terror	Nivas	
1985	Punnami Ratri	Sudheer	
1985	Khooni	Inspector Vijay	
1986	Manchi Manasulu		
1986	Chaitanyam		
1986	Samajamlo Sthree		
1986	Vetagallu	Raja	
1986	Police Officer	Bhanu Prakash	
1986	Nireekshana	Murali Krishna	Nominated-Filmfare Award for Best Actor – Telugu
1987	Hantakudi Veta		
1987	Lawyer Suhasini	Shankar	
1987	Udayam		
1987	Chaitanya Radham		
1988	Veguchukka Pagatichukka		
1989	Sutradharulu	Tirumaladasu	
1989	Aakhari Kshanam		
1989	Dhruva Nakshatram		
1990	Alajadi		
1990	Neti Dowrjanyam	Vikram	
1990	Udhyamam	Bhargav	
1991	Aswani	Prabhakar	
1991	Keechu Raallu		
1991	Atiradhudu	Teja	
1991	Stuvartpuram Dongalu		
1991	Nayakuralu		
1991	Ganga		
1992	Gang War		
1992	Public Rowdy		
1993	Nakshatra Poratam		
1994	Raithu Bharatam		
1994	Puttinilla Mettinilla		
1994	President Gari Alludu	Jagadeesh / Jaggu Dada	
1995	Desa Drohulu		Also director and music composer
1997	Sindhooram	Training Officer	
1999	Velugu Needalu		
1999	Devi	Vijay's elder brother	
2001	Evadra Rowdy	Sub Inspector of Police	
2003	Simhadri	Aravind	
2003	Hari Villu		
2003	Inspector		
2004	Kushi Kushigaa		
2004	Madhyanam Hathya	Police Inspector	
2006	Style	Raghava's father	
2007	Dubai Seenu	Srinu's brother-in-law	
2007	Hello Premistara		
2007	Evadaithe Nakenti		
2008	Naa Anevaadu		
2008	Deepavali	Commissioner	
2008	Indrajith		
2008	Veedu Mamoolodu Kadu	Chakri's father	
2009	Baanam		
2009	Rechipo		
2010	Manasara		
2010	Bindaas		
2011	Aakasame Haddu	Narayana's father	
2012	Uu Kodathara? Ulikki Padathara?	Seshayya	
2015	Ram Leela		
2017	Mixture Potlam	Yathindra	
2019	Kathanayakudu	ACP	
2020	HIT: The First Case	Viswanath	
2022	Kinnerasani		
2022	Saakini Daakini	Pratap IPS	
2024	RAM (Rapid Action Mission)	Jaiprakash Baradwaj "JB"	
2024	Music Shop Murthy	Ramakrishna	

=== Tamil ===
Year	Film	Role	Notes
1980	Moodu Pani	Ravi	Uncredited
1982	Neethi Devan Mayakkam	Rajesh	
1982	Nizhal Thedum Nenjangal		
1983	Silk Silk Silk	Nirmal Kumar	
1984	Neengal Kettavai	Ramu	
1984	Theerpu En Kaiyil		
1986	Murattu Karangal	Maari	
1988	Veedu	Gopi	
1990	Muthalaliyamma		
2003	Arasu	Police Inspector Sundaramurthy	
2003	Whistle	Police Inspector Sayyad	
2004	Machi	Mohanram	
2005	Vairavan	Psychiatrist Doctor	
2006	Thimiru	Ganesh's uncle	
2007	Thoovanam	Anu's father	
2007	Mirugam		
2010	Vilai	DCP Venkatanarayanan	Guest appearance
2010	Gowravargal	Bhagavan	
2011	Siruthai	DGP	
2011	Marudhavelu		Special appearance
2012	Etho Seithai Ennai	Arjun's father	
2014	Marumugam		
2015	Ettuthikkum Madhayaanai	Ponmanikkam	
2015	Kanchana 2	Chandru	
2017	Vilayattu Aarambam	Emcee	
2017	Pudhu Varusham		
2022	Oh My Dog	Nassar	

=== Kannada ===
Year	Film	Role	Notes
1998	Bayalu Deepa		
1998	Goonda Mathu Police		
1998	Karnataka Police	Prashanth	
2012	Kanteerava		

=== Television ===
Tamil

- 1991 Penn
- 1990s Kalloori Kalam
- 1990s Sorgam
- 2000 Micro Thodargal- Mounam Oru Bashai
- 2004–2005 Engiruntho Vandhaal
- 2006–2008 Kana Kaanum Kaalangal
- 2012 Karthigai Pengal
