= Missi (film) =

- Directed by: Thoppil Bhasi
- Written by: Pamman; Thoppil Bhasi (dialogues)
- Screenplay by: Thoppil Bhasi
- Produced by: M. O. Joseph
- Starring: Lakshmi; K. P. Ummer; Sudheer; Mohan Sharma; Vidhubala; Sankaradi
- Cinematography: Balu Mahendra
- Edited by: M. S. Mani
- Music by: G. Devarajan; Lyrics: Bichu Thirumala; Mankombu Gopalakrishnan; Bharanikkavu Sivakumar; Madhu Alappuzha
- Production company: Manjilas
- Distributed by: Manjilas
- Release date: 12 November 1976
- Country: India
- Language: Malayalam

Missi is a 1976 Indian Malayalam film, directed by Thoppil Bhasi and produced by M. O. Joseph. The film stars Lakshmi, Mohan Sharma, K. P. Ummer, Sudheer, Vidhubala, M G Soman, Sankaradi in the lead roles. The film has musical score by G. Devarajan.

== Cast ==
- Lakshmi
- K. P. Ummer
- M. G. Soman
- Sudheer
- Vidhubala
- Mohan Sharma
- Sam
- Sankaradi
- Babu Joseph
- Janardanan
- Vallathol Unnikrishnan

== Soundtrack ==
The music was composed by G. Devarajan and the lyrics were written by Madhu Alappuzha, Mankombu Gopalakrishnan, Bharanikkavu Sivakumar and Bichu Thirumala.

No.	Song	Singers	Lyrics	Length (m:ss)
1	"Anuraagam Anuraagam"	K. J. Yesudas	Madhu Alappuzha	
2	"Gangaa pravaahathil"	P. Jayachandran	Mankombu Gopalakrishnan	
3	"Harivamshaashtami"	P. Madhuri	Bharanikkavu Sivakumar	
4	"Kunkumasandhya"	P. Susheela	Mankombu Gopalakrishnan	
5	"Urangoo Onnurangoo"	P. Madhuri	Bichu Thirumala	
