= Nireekshana =

1986 film by Balu Mahendra

- Poster
- Directed by: Balu Mahendra
- Screenplay by: Balu Mahendra; Jandhyala (dialogues)
- Story by: Ahila Mahendra
- Produced by: Linga Raju
- Starring: Bhanu Chander; Archana
- Cinematography: Balu Mahendra
- Edited by: Balu Mahendra
- Music by: Ilaiyaraaja
- Production company: Lakshmi Films Division
- Release date: 14 March 1986
- Running time: 135 minutes
- Country: India
- Language: Telugu

Nireekshana is a 1986 Indian Telugu-language romantic drama film co-written, directed, filmed, and edited by Balu Mahendra. Produced by Linga Raju, the film stars Bhanu Chander and Archana. Allu Ramalingaiah, P. L. Narayana and Rallapalli play supporting roles. The music was composed by Ilaiyaraaja. The film is remake of Malayalam film Yathra. The film won two Nandi Awards. The film was dubbed and released in Tamil, under the title Kanne Kalaimane.

== Plot ==
Shortly after his release from prison, Murali Krishna is walking along a rural road when he accepts a lift from a passing school bus. As he travels alongside the driver, principal, and the school children, Murali narrates his story.

Years earlier, Murali, an orphan, is posted as a forest conservator in a remote hilly region. While working there, he meets Tulasi, an innocent tribal woman living in the forest. Despite their different backgrounds and cultural differences, the two deeply fall in love and decide to get married. Thrilled about starting a family, Murali leaves the forest for a short trip to inform his close friend about his impending wedding.

On his return journey, Murali is intercepted and wrongfully arrested by the police, who mistake him for a fugitive Naxalite leader due to a striking physical resemblance. Terrified and desperate to return to Tulasi, Murali attempts to escape the custody. During the chaotic scuffle, a police officer is accidentally killed. Consequently, Murali is convicted of murder and sentenced to a prolonged term in prison.

Inside the prison, Murali suffers physical abuse and severe hardships. Early during his imprisonment, Tulasi's father visits him to plead with Murali to convince her to let go of him and move on with her life. Profoundly conflicted, Murali heavy-heartedly writes a letter asking her to forget him and marry someone else. Over the course of several years, Murali receives no response, leaving him uncertain of her decision. As his release date finally approaches, he sends one last letter informing her of the date he will be returning. He insists that she light a deepam at a shrine in the outskirts of her village if she is unmarried and waiting for him, stating that if the deepam is not lit, he will understand that she is married and will leave without entering the village.

Back in the present on the school bus, the passengers eagerly wait by the windows to see if the lamp is lit. As the bus stops, Murali looks out to discover the pathway illuminated by multiple deepams lit by Tulasi, who has waited for his return. The two embrace and emotionally reunite.

== Cast ==
- Bhanu Chander as Murali Krishna
- Archana as Tulasi
- P. L. Narayana as Tulasi's father
- Rallapalli
- Allu Ramalingaiah as the church father
- Narra Venkateswara Rao as Inspector D. Arjun Rao
- Kaikala Satyanarayana as the jailer
- Nirmalamma
- P. J. Sarma
- B. Saroja Devi
- Ranjitha
- K. K. Sarma
- Anju
- Preethi
- Keerthy Meenakshi
- Sumathi
- Malleswari
- Seethalakshmi

== Production ==
Archana acted for most of the film without wearing a blouse. The film was also inspired by the human rights violations that occurred during the Emergency period (1975–77).

== Soundtrack ==
The music and background score was composed by Ilaiyaraaja.

In the original Telugu version, the lyrics were written by Aatreya. The Telugu soundtrack was published by Aditya Music and Mango Music. The Tamil dubbed version, titled Kanne Kalaimaane, featured adapted lyrics and was released by Kosmic Music.

The song "Aakasam Eenatidho" is adapted from the Tamil song "Sangathil Paadatha", originally composed by Ilaiyaraaja for the film Auto Raaja (1982).

=== Telugu version ===
Telugu Track listing
No.	Title	Singer(s)	Length
1.	"Thiyyani Danimma"	S. P. Balasubrahmanyam, S. P. Sailaja	4:23
2.	"Yamuna Theere"	S. Janaki	4:17
3.	"Chukkalle Thochave"	K. J. Yesudas	4:22
4.	"Aakasam Eenatidho"	S. Janaki	3:55
Total length:			16:17

=== Tamil version (Kanne Kalaimaane) ===
Tamil Track listing
No.	Title	Singer(s)	Length
1.	"Yamuna Nadhikku Vandhu"	S. Janaki	4:37
2.	"Neerveezhchi Thee Muttuthey"	S. Janaki	4:17
3.	"Singara Thazhambo Pookindra"	S. P. Sailaja, S. P. Balasubrahmanyam	4:37
4.	"Un Kannil Neeranen"	P. Jayachandran	4:47
Total length:			18:18

== Reception ==
Reviewing the Tamil-dubbed version Kanne Kalaimaane, Jayamanmadhan of Kalki appreciated Balu Mahendra's cinematography, said Archana had incredible eyes, and Bhanu Chander was "o.k".

== Accolades ==
Balu Mahendra won the Best Cinematographer, and Archana won the Special Jury Award.
