= Veera Santhanam =

Indian painter, activist, and actor

- Died: July 13, 2017 (aged 71)
- Occupations: Painter; activist; actor
- Years active: 1989–present

Veera Santhanam was an Indian painter, activist, and actor known for creating Mullivaikal Muttram.

== Career ==
He graduated from Kumbakonam Arts College and his paintings are inspired by murals and everyday life in Chennai. As an activist, he supported Sri Lankan Tamil nationalism during the civil war in the country. He also acted in several films including the Tamil film Kaththi (2014). He played the lead role in Gnanaserukku (2018) directed by the independent filmmaker Dharani Rajendran. He won Best Actor award at Five Continents International Film Festival, Venezuela.

== Filmography ==
- Sandhya Raagam (1989)
- Aval Peyar Thamizharasi (2010)
- Magizhchi (2010)
- Velayudham (2011)
- Pizza (2012)
- Pizza II: Villa (2013)
- Jannal Oram (2013)
- Kaththi (2014)
- Anegan (2015)
- Urumeen (2015)
- Gnanaserukku (2018) (posthumous release)

== Death ==
He died on 13 July 2017 at age 71. He died four days after dubbing for his role in Gnanaserukku.
