= Chuvanna Sandhyakal =

1975 film

- Directed by: K. S. Sethumadhavan
- Written by: Balu Mahendra; Thoppil Bhasi (dialogues)
- Screenplay by: Thoppil Bhasi
- Produced by: M. O. Joseph
- Starring: Adoor Bhasi; Lakshmi; Mohan Sharma; M. G. Soman
- Cinematography: Balu Mahendra
- Music by: G. Devarajan
- Production company: Manjilas
- Distributed by: Manjilas
- Release date: 21 March 1975
- Country: India
- Language: Malayalam

Chuvanna Sandhyakal is a 1975 Indian Malayalam film, directed by K. S. Sethumadhavan and produced by M. O. Joseph. The film stars Adoor Bhasi, Lakshmi, Mohan Sharma and Sam in the lead roles. The film has musical score by G. Devarajan.

== Cast ==
- Adoor Bhasi
- Lakshmi
- Mohan Sharma
- Sam(A.T.Samuel)
- Sankaradi
- Bahadoor
- M. G. Soman
- Manibala
- Meena
- Paravoor Bharathan
- Sujatha
- Vidhubala

== Soundtrack ==
The music was composed by G. Devarajan and the lyrics were written by Vayalar.

No.	Song	Singers	Lyrics	Length (m:ss)
1	"Achyuthaananda"	P. Leela	Vayalar	
2	"Ithihaasangal Janikkum"	Srikanth	Vayalar	
3	"Kaalindi Kaalindi"	K. J. Yesudas	Vayalar	
4	"Nightingale"	P. Jayachandran	Vayalar	
5	"Poovukalkku Punyakaalam"	P. Susheela	Vayalar	
6	"Vritham Kondu Melinjoru"	P. Madhuri	Vayalar	
