= Archana (actress) =

Indian actress and dancer

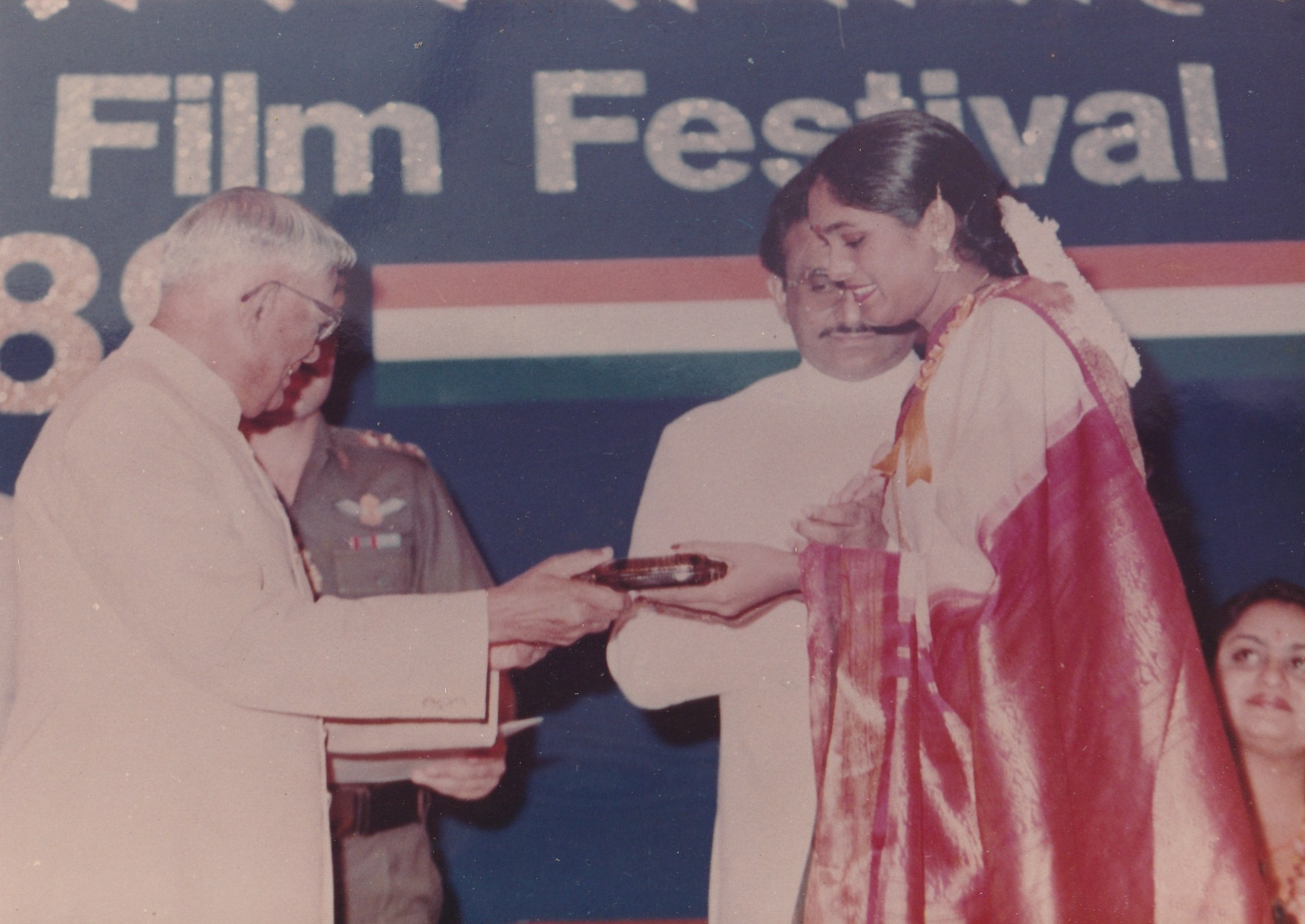
- Archana in 1989 (1988)
- Born: Sudha; Vijayawada, Andhra Pradesh, India
- Occupation: Actress

Archana (born as Sudha) is an Indian actress, Kuchipudi and Kathak dancer, known for her works in Tamil, Telugu, Malayalam and Kannada films.Regarded as one of the notable performers of Indian parallel and regional cinema, she is particularly recognised for her naturalistic acting, emotional depth and ability to portray complex and grounded characters with remarkable restraint. She is the recipient of two National Film Awards.

== Filmography ==
=== Films ===
Year	Title	Role	Language	Notes
1980	Thai Pongal		Tamil	
1980	Thunive Thozhan		Tamil	
1981	Madhura Geetam		Telugu	
1982	Kadhal Oviyam		Tamil	
1983	Vasanthame Varuga		Tamil	
1983	Police Venkataswamy		Telugu	
1984	Neengal Kettavai	Radha	Tamil	
1984	Premigala Saval		Kannada	
1984	Puyal Kadantha Bhoomi	Valli	Tamil	
1985	Thammil Thammil	Gayathri	Malayalam	
1985	Yemaatrathe Yemaaraathe		Tamil	
1986	Malamukalile Daivam	Marie	Malayalam	
1986	Nireekshana	Tulasi	Telugu	
1986	Belli Naaga		Kannada	
1986	Guri	Shantadevi	Kannada	
1986	Ladies Tailor	Sujatha	Telugu	
1987	Rettai Vaal Kuruvi	Tulasi	Tamil	
1987	Ondu Muttina Kathe	Kaaki	Kannada	
1988	Daasi	Kamakshi	Telugu	
1988	Ukku Sankellu		Telugu	
1988	Veedu	Sudha	Tamil	
1988	Sri Vemana Charitra	Vishwada	Telugu	
1989	Piravi	Chakyar's daughter	Malayalam	
1989	Sandhya Raagam	Thulasi	Tamil	
1989	Bagh Bahadur	Radha	Bengali	
1990	Matti Manushulu		Telugu	
1991	Vidhata	Jwala	Telugu	
1991	Vaidehi Vandhachu		Tamil	
1991	Bharat Bandh		Telugu	
1991	Onnaam Muhurtham	Radhika Vishwanath	Malayalam	
1992	Chakravyuham		Telugu	
1992	Prema Drohi		Telugu	
1992	Yamanam	Ambil	Malayalam	
1993	Mo Kanhure		Odia	
1994	Pachcha Toranam		Telugu	
1994	Sammohanam	Pennu	Malayalam	
1996	Madamma		Malayalam	
1996	Huliya	Mydani	Kannada	
2002	Nishad	Sati Gujaral	Hindi	
2007	Parattai Engira Azhagu Sundaram	Meenakshi	Tamil	
2007	Onbadhu Roobai Nottu	Velayi	Tamil	
2018	Kinar	Suganthi	Malayalam	
2018	Keni	Suganthi	Tamil	
2018	Seethakaathi	Lakshmi	Tamil	
2019	Namma Veettu Pillai	Thenmozhi	Tamil	
2019	Azhiyatha Kolangal 2	Mohana	Tamil	
2022	Chor Bazaar	Bachchan Saab's guardian	Telugu	
2025	Shashtipoorthi	Bhuvana	Telugu	
2025	Gandhi Kannadi	Kannamma	Tamil	
2025	Champion	Kamalamma	Telugu	
2026	Breakfast		Tamil	

=== Television ===
- Meenakshi Ponnunga (2022–2023) on Zee Tamil as Meenakshi

== Awards and nominations ==
Year	Awards	Category	Work	Result	Ref.
1986	Nandi Awards	Nandi Special Jury Award	Nireekshana	Won	
1988	National Film Awards	Best Actress	Veedu	Won	
1989	Filmfare Awards South	Best Actress – Tamil	Veedu	Won	
1989	National Film Awards	Best Actress	Daasi	Won	
2007	Tamil Nadu State Film Awards	Best Character Artiste (Female)	Onbadhu Roobai Nottu	Won	
