= Pasi Sathya =

Indian actress

- Born: Sathya
- Occupation: Actress
- Years active: 1974-present
- Notable work: Pasi; Veedu; Magalir Mattum; Anbe Sivam
- Television: Chithi, Annamalai, Chellamay, Kana Kaanum Kaalangal, Ilavarasi, Mahalakshmi
- Children: 2
- Awards: Kalaimamani
- Honours: Kalaichelvam

Pasi Sathya is an Indian actress who has worked predominantly in Tamil cinema and television. She has worked in popular movies like Veedu, Magalir Mattum, Pudhupettai. She made her debut in the National award-winning Tamil film, Pasi, in 1979. She played Chellamma, a friend of Shoba, who played the main lead role. After the film, she has used the prefix Pasi. Sathya debuted in Netru Indru Naalai. The film was released in 1974. It has been more than 40 years since she came to the cinema and she has acted in over 250 films and 2000 stage plays.

== Early career ==
Sathya's hometown is Madurai. Her mother is a music teacher and her dad, a central government employee. Her acting journey began with the Pavalakodi drama. She acted in several plays in school. Then she came to Chennai and focused on plays. She was not interested in studies after 9th grade. She has acted in several plays in the presence of great actors including MGR and Sivaji. Sathya has appeared in more than 2,000 stage plays.

== Film career ==
The veteran actress P. Bhanumathi Ramakrishna who enjoyed her performance gave her the nickname as Pasi Sathya. She is known for her role as a character actor in Tamil cinema. Despite being a talented artist, She is not overlooked. She played a nurse in the 1999 musical romantic comedy film, Poovellam Kettuppar. She was also part of the 2001 Tamil romantic film, Shahjahan. In 2003, Sathya also acted in Kamal Haasan-starrer Anbe Sivam. Other films under her credit are Veeran Veluthambi (1987), Vellaiya Thevan (1990), Patthathu Raani (1992), Magalir Mattum (1994), Nila, Sindhu Nathi Poo (1994), Thirumoorthy (1995), H_{2}O (2002), Engal Anna (2004), Sukran (2005), Kadhalil Vizhunthen (2008), and a lot more.

== Family ==
Sathya's husband is a retired government employee and she has two children.

== Awards and honours ==
- The Tamil Nadu Government has awarded her the Kalaimamani Award in 1999.
- The South Indian Artists Association awarded her the Kalaichelvam award.

== Television career ==
She is currently acting in Tamil TV series. Pasi Sathya also acted on television and played as Vijay Sarathy's mother in the 1999 Tamil soap opera, Chithi. The same year, she was seen as Maya in9 Raadhika Sarathkumar's drama series, Chellame. In 2002, she earned praises for her performance on Sun TV's Tamil television serial, Annamalai and Jaya TV serial in Roja which aired in 2003-2005. She also bagged a role on Sun TV's Tamil soap, Ilavarasi. even she acted in, Nimmathi Ungal Choice 2 on sun TV and Kasalavu Nesam as comic role and character roles in Oru Pennin Kadhai on DD Podhigai,sorgam on Sun TV and Vairanenjam on Kalaignar TV where Vairanenjam has dubbed as aadajanma on Star Maa and Swarna Manasu on Asianet.currently playing supporting role in Poove Unakkaga on Sun TV

== Filmography ==
This is a partial filmography. You can expand it.

Year	Film	Role	Notes
1974	Netru Indru Naalai	Slum Resident	
1976	Uzhaikkum Karangal	Villager	
1979	Pasi	Chellamma	
1981	Kathoduthan Naan Pesuven		
1982	Chinnanchirusugal		
1982	Ayiram Muthangal		
1982	Antha Rathirikku Satchi Illai		
1983	Mundhanai Mudichu	Valli	
1983	Thoongathey Thambi Thoongathey		
1984	Ambigai Neril Vanthaal		
1984	Veetuku Oru Kannagi		
1984	Kudumbam		
1984	Naan Paadum Paadal		
1985	Mannukketha Ponnu		
1985	Engal Kural		
1985	Padikkadha Pannaiyar		
1985	Samayapurathale Satchi		
1986	Karimedu Karuvayan		
1986	Engal Thaikulame Varuga		
1987	Enga Ooru Pattukaran		
1987	Veeran Veluthambi		
1988	Veedu	Mangamma	
1990	Vellaiya Thevan		
1991	Idhaya Oonjal		
1991	Onnum Theriyatha Pappa		
1992	Brahmachari		
1992	Pokkiri Thambi		
1992	Pattathu Raani		
1992	Annai Vayal		
1992	Marupakkam		
1993	Marupadiyum		
1993	Maamiyar Veedu		
1993	Moondravadhu Kann	Sornakili	
1993	Nallathe Nadakkum		
1994	Magalir Mattum	Madhavi	
1994	Duet		
1994	May Maadham		
1994	Mani Rathnam		
1994	Nila		
1994	Sindhu Nathi Poo		
1995	Sathi Leelavathi		
1995	Chinna Vathiyar		
1995	Thirumoorthy		
1995	Kuruthipunal		
1996	Vaikarai Pookkal		
1997	Raasi	Narikuravar	
1998	Moovendhar	Nurse	
1999	Poovellam Kettuppar	Nurse Kalyani	
2000	Maayi		
2000	Ennavalle		
2001	Seerivarum Kaalai		
2001	Shahjahan		
2002	H2O	Chennoor villager	Kannada-Tamil bilingual film
2002	Thamizhan	Villager	Uncredited
2002	Raja	Priya's housemaid	
2002	Guruvamma		
2003	Anbe Sivam		
2003	Kaiyodu Kai		
2003	Thirumalai	Paravatham, Palani's grandmother	
2004	Engal Anna	Durairaj's mother	
2005	Sukran		
2006	Pudhupettai	Adopter of Kokki Kumar's Baby	
2006	Don Chera	Kutty's mother	
2007	Niram		
2008	Kadhalil Vizhunthen		
2009	Pinju Manasu		
2009	Innoruvan		
2013	Thirumathi Thamizh		
2013	Thalaimuraigal		
2016	Tamilselvanum Thaniyar Anjalum	Mary	
2016	Kuttrame Thandanai		
2018	Traffic Ramasamy		
2018	Maari 2	Nurse	
2021	Anti Indian	Saroja's friend	
2023	Irugapatru	Housemaid	
