= Balu Mahendra Library =

- பாலு மகேந்திரா நூலகம்
- 9.3961°N 80.3997°E
- Location: Kilinochchi, Sri Lanka
- Type: Non-profit library
- Established: September 26, 2020

Collection
- Items collected: International film circles and Blu-rays, film books, educational videos, audiobooks
- Size: 13,000
- Criteria for collection: Films and books recommended by world-renowned film schools, filmmakers, and film critics

Other information
- Employees: 2
- Website: Balu Mahendra Library

Balu Mahendra Library is a community-based film and media library located in Kilinochchi, Sri Lanka. The library was established in 2020 by a group of young Tamil filmmakers and cinephiles as a tribute to acclaimed Tamil filmmaker Balu Mahendra.

== History and purpose ==
The library was launched with the aim of cultivating a deeper appreciation for cinema, visual literacy, and storytelling among the younger generation, especially in the post-war Tamil communities of Northern Sri Lanka. It is named after Balu Mahendra in recognition of his contributions to Tamil cinema and his influence as a visual storyteller.

The inauguration of the library saw participation and support from renowned filmmakers including Iranian director Majid Majidi, Sinhala filmmaker Prasanna Vithanage, and Tamil director Bharathiraja. Their involvement symbolized cross-cultural solidarity and underscored the library's broader mission of using cinema as a medium for education, healing, and creative empowerment in post-war Northern Sri Lanka.

Located in Kilinochchi, a region heavily affected by the Sri Lankan civil war, the initiative is seen as part of a broader cultural revival. The library provides access to books, essays, and research materials related to film studies, aesthetics, visual media, and global cinema, and also hosts workshops, discussions, and screenings.

== Cultural impact ==
The Balu Mahendra Library is regarded as one of the few dedicated film resource centers in Northern Province of Sri Lanka. It reflects an effort to reclaim space for artistic education and narrative empowerment, especially for Tamil youth who have limited access to creative infrastructure.

== See also ==
- Sri Lankan Tamil cinema
