= Panimudakku =

- Directed by: P. N. Menon
- Written by: Peruvaaram Chandrasekaran; Thoppil Bhasi (dialogues)
- Screenplay by: Thoppil Bhasi
- Produced by: P. N. Menon; M. B. Pisharadi
- Starring: Madhu; Ammini; Maya; Mohan Sharma
- Cinematography: Balu Mahendra
- Edited by: Ravi
- Music by: M. S. Baburaj
- Production company: Menon Productions
- Distributed by: Menon Productions
- Release date: 21 January 1972
- Country: India
- Language: Malayalam

Panimudakku is a 1972 Indian Malayalam-language film, directed and produced by P. N. Menon. The film stars Madhu, Ammini, Maya and Mohan Sharma. The film had musical score by M. S. Baburaj.

== Cast ==
- Madhu
- P. R. Varalakshmi
- Mohan Sharma
- Prema
- Sankaradi
- Nilambur Balan
- Aravindakshan
- Baby Yamuna
- Bahadoor
- Balan K. Nair
- Cindrella
- George Angamali
- Girish Kumar
- Gopalakrishnan
- Kalamandalam Kshemavathi
- Kaviyoor Sasi
- Kottarakkara Sreedharan Nair
- Kuthiravattam Pappu
- Kuttyedathi Vilasini
- M. R. Menon
- Narayanankutty
- P. O. Thomas
- Pala Thankam
- Paravoor Bharathan
- R. K. Nair
- Ramani
- Sasikala
- Shantha
- Susheela
- Thankam
- Vanchiyoor Radha
- Xavier
- Narayanan Nair

== Soundtrack ==
The music was composed by M. S. Baburaj with lyrics by Vayalar Ramavarma.

No.	Song	Singers	Lyrics	Length (m:ss)
1	"Maanasasarassin"	S. Janaki	Vayalar Ramavarma	
2	"Vijayadashami Vidarumee"	S. Janaki, P. Susheeladevi	Vayalar Ramavarma	
3	"Viplavam Jayikkatte"	K. J. Yesudas, P. Jayachandran, Raveendran, Chorus, Raghu, C. Thampi	Vayalar Ramavarma	

== Trivia ==
Panimudakku was cinematographer Balu Mahendra's first release. Though he debuted in Nellu (1971), Panimudakku got released first.
