= Sandhya Raagam =

- Title card
- Directed by: Balu Mahendra
- Screenplay by: Balu Mahendra
- Story by: Akila Mahendra
- Produced by: Balu Mahendra
- Starring: Archana; Chokkalinga Bhagavathar; Oviyar Santhanam
- Cinematography: Balu Mahendra
- Edited by: Balu Mahendra
- Music by: L. Vaidyanathan
- Distributed by: Doordarshan
- Release date: 1989
- Running time: 84 minutes
- Country: India
- Language: Tamil

Sandhya Raagam (transl. Tune of the Twilight) is a 1989 Indian Tamil-language drama film produced, written and directed by Balu Mahendra. It stars Archana, Chokkalinga Bhagavathar and Oviyar Santhanam in prominent roles. Shot in black-and-white, the film was photographed and edited by Mahendra himself. At the 37th National Film Awards, it won the Award for Best Film on Family Welfare (1990).

== Plot ==
Chokkalingam, an octogenarian, leaves his village upon the death of his wife. He migrates to Madras, where his nephew Vasu, a lower-middle-class man lives along with his family. Chokkalingam becomes an additional burden for Vasu, who is not able to meet the demands of his own family.

== Cast ==
- Archana as Thulasi
- Chokkalinga Bhagavathar as Chokkalingam
- Oviyar Santhanam as Vasu
- Baby Rajalakshmi as Valli

== Themes ==
The film's central theme revolves around old age.

== Production ==
The film was made on a shoestring budget. Like his previous films, Mahendra wrote the screenplay, edited and photographed the film apart from handling the direction. Ramasamy was hired as the art director while V. S. Murthy and A. S. Laxmi Narayanan looked after the audiography. The film did not have any songs; L. Vaidyanathan composed the background score.

== Reception ==
Sandhya Raagam is yet to have a theatrical release, but was regularly aired on Doordarshan. N. Krishnaswamy of The Indian Express said, "Balu Mahendra narrates the plight of his lead character with a tremendously observant eye. The celluloid breathes silence and beauty, and the humour and piquancy of the situations are striking".

The film won the National Film Award for Best Film on Family Welfare in 1990. A year later, it was screened at the International Film Festival of India along with Anjali (1990) as the only two Tamil films as part of Indian Panorama. In a 2007 interview to The Hindu, Mahendra said that Sandhya Raagam and Veedu were his two films "with the fewest compromises and mistakes".

In 2011, Mahendra said that there was no existing negative of the film.

== Bibliography ==
- Baskaran, S. Theodore (2013) [1996]. The eye of the serpent: An introduction to Tamil cinema. Westland. ISBN 978-93-83260-74-4.
