= Sigappu Rojakkal =

1978 film by Bharathiraja

- Theatrical release poster
- Directed by: Bharathirajaa
- Written by: Bharathirajaa
- Dialogue by: Bhagyaraj
- Produced by: J. Padmavathi
- Starring: Kamal Haasan; Sridevi
- Cinematography: P. S. Nivas
- Edited by: P. Bhaskaran
- Music by: Ilaiyaraaja
- Production company: K. R. G. Productions
- Release date: 28 October 1978
- Country: India
- Language: Tamil

Sigappu Rojakkal (pronounced [siɡappu ɾoːdʑaːkkaɭ] transl. Red Roses) is a 1978 Indian Tamil-language psychological crime thriller film directed and co-written by Bharathirajaa. The film starring Kamal Haasan and Sridevi, with Goundamani, Bhagyaraj and Vadivukkarasi in supporting roles. It revolves around Dileep, a seemingly humble man who secretly kills women after having sex with them.

Sigappu Rojakkal was inspired by serial killer Raman Raghav's crimes, and another serial killer who was based in Bombay but hailed from Tirunelveli. It was deliberately meant to be different from Bharathiraja's earlier ventures, which were set in villages. The dialogues were written by Bhagyaraj, and cinematography was handled by P. S. Nivas, and the music was composed by Ilaiyaraaja.

Sigappu Rojakkal was released on 28 October 1978, three days before Diwali, and completed a 175-day in most theatres in Tamil Nadu. It won two Filmfare Awards in the Best Actor and Best Director categories. The film was later remade by Bharathiraja himself in Hindi as Red Rose (1980).

== Plot ==
Dileep is an industrialist who runs a company named Minerva Exports & Imports. Despite his humble exterior, he has a dark side; he preys on nubile girls, has sex with them, and kills them. These proceedings are filmed and watched by his adoptive father and mentor, another deranged woman-hater who, as with Dileep, had a disillusioning experience with women in his past. The man stays holed up in a far corner of Dileep's mansion, watching his adopted son carry out what he is too infirm to do. The victims are buried in Dileep's garden, and a red rose bush grows above each of them.

Dileep meets a garment saleswoman, Sarada, and develops a romantic attraction for her. The romance proceeds, but conservative Sarada insists that Dileep must marry her if he wants a life with her. On their first night after marriage, Dileep rushes away to tackle a witness who had seen him taking Chitra, an employee of Minerva, to a restaurant; Chitra was subsequently killed by Dileep. After offering the witness, a waiter at the restaurant, some money, the waiter counters with a demand for more money to remain silent. Dileep kills him.

Meanwhile, Sarada, who has been waiting for Dileep, notices several odd situations at home. Dileep's cat licks Sarada's blood after she accidentally cuts her finger. The cat chases her, and she ends up in a secret room where the entire story of Dileep is written on a wall by him.

Dileep, born Muthu, was an orphan who was taken in to do odd jobs by a caring family. The daughter of the family begins to lust after Muthu and tries to seduce him, but her parents come home. The girl accuses Muthu of assaulting her, causing the parents to throw him out of the house. He ends up with another couple four days later and becomes their helper. When the husband leaves on a business trip, the wife goes out for the night and drunkenly brings home another man. The husband's flight is delayed, and he returns home to find his wife in bed with the other man. Overwhelmed with rage, he kills her. Muthu has a nervous breakdown, encouraging the husband to stab her, and that all women are this way. This only endears him to his new father.

In the present, a frightened Sarada rushes out and stumbles into the room of Dileep's adoptive father (whom Dileep had told her was mentally ill and not to be disturbed) and gets shocked seeing him watching films of Dileep having sex with girls and killing them. Sarada screams, catching his attention, but manages to lock him in his room. She tries to escape, but Dileep returns.

When Dileep goes to park his car, Sarada rushes out of the house. After freeing his adoptive father and realising that his cover has been blown, Dileep chases Sarada. The chase culminates in a graveyard where Dileep accidentally gets impaled by a cross. When he continues to chase Sarada while staggering, he is caught by the police. Dileep is imprisoned but becomes mentally imbalanced. He keeps chanting and writing Sarada's name on the wall as it is the only coherent thought that remains; all other memories have been erased from his mind. Sarada, instead of remarrying, regularly visits Dileep in jail, confident that their marriage will be saved and Dileep will be released soon.

== Cast ==
- Kamal Haasan as Muthu (Dileep)
- Sridevi as Sarada
- Goundamani as the manager of Minerva Exports & Imports
- Bhagyaraj as the waiter
- Vadivukkarasi as Chitra
- K. K. Soundar as the police inspector

== Production ==
=== Development ===
After directing two films – 16 Vayathinile (1977) and Kizhakke Pogum Rail (1978) – which were set in villages, Bharathiraja chose to set his third film, the thriller Sigappu Rojakkal in the city to circumvent criticism that he could only make village-based films. The film was inspired by serial killer Raman Raghav's crimes, and another serial killer who was based in Bombay but hailed from Tirunelveli. Bharathiraja said he wrote the script in three days. It was produced by J. Padmavathi under K. R. G. Productions. K. Bhagyaraj worked as an assistant director.

=== Casting ===
Bharathirajaa wanted actor Sivakumar to act in the lead role of Muthu / Dileep, over his assistant directors' objections. But after he narrated the story, Sivakumar rejected the offer, feeling it was not suitable for him despite liking the story. Kamal Haasan was eventually cast. He claims to have known the story of the film six years before shooting began. For his character's looks, Haasan primarily wore "fitted suits with button-up shirts, ties" and flared bell-bottoms, in addition to "bright printed button-up shirts with enlarged collars and leather jackets". Haasan's looks in the film were inspired by the American serial killers Ted Bundy and Albert DeSalvo, while his "black leather jacket" was inspired by the one worn by Alan Arkin in Wait Until Dark (1967). Sridevi was cast as Sarada, collaborating with Bharathirajaa for the second time after 16 Vayathinile. Bharathirajaa initially cast Goundamani as a waiter and Bhagyaraj as the manager of Dileep's export company, but the actors later switched their roles. This was the feature film debut of Vadivukkarasi, who played Chitra. Bharathirajaa got a cat from his friend R. C. Prakash to portray Dileep's cat.

=== Filming ===
Haasan had told Bharathiraja that his character, a psychopathic killer, should not be singing and dancing but Bharathiraja deflected Haasan's objection, saying that the song "Ninaivo Oru Paravai" was a dream sequence, shot from the heroine's point of view. One of the shooting locations was a bungalow called Kamakoti House in T. Nagar. Filming was completed within 30 working days.

== Soundtrack ==
The music was composed by Ilaiyaraaja. When Haasan was singing an English song at a concert, Ilaiyaraaja who witnessed this observed that he sang the higher notes well, and thus provided him to sing "Ninaivo Oru Paravai". A remixed version of the song was later included on M. Rafi's album Aasaiyae Alaipolae.

Track listing
No.	Title	Lyrics	Singer(s)	Length
1.	"Minminikku Kannil Oru"	Kannadasan	S. Janaki, Malaysia Vasudevan	4:28
2.	"Ninaivo Oru Paravai"	Vaali	Kamal Haasan, S. Janaki	4:45
Total length:				9:13

== Release and reception ==
Sigappu Rojakkal was released on 28 October 1978, three days before Diwali. In a review dated 19 November 1978, the Tamil magazine Ananda Vikatan rated the film 53 out of 100. Sivasankari, writing for Kalki, lauded virtually every aspect of the film including the direction, editing, camerawork, music and cast performances. Naagai Dharuman of Anna praised the acting, Ilaiyaraaja's music, Bhagyaraj's dialogues, Nivas's cinematography and concluded saying Bharathiraja deserves praise for directing the film in a way that is enjoyable despite the lack of a strong story and events, and despite the flaws. Despite facing competition from other Diwali releases, the film became a commercial success. It won two Filmfare Awards in the Best Actor and Best Director categories.

== Remakes ==
Sigappu Rojakkal was remade in Hindi by Bharathiraja himself as Red Rose (1980). By 2010, Bharathiraja's son Manoj was revealed to be making his directorial debut by remaking Sigappu Rojakkal. After his stint as an assistant director in S. Shankar's Enthiran, Manoj continued fine-tuning the script and stated it was not a full remake and only drew inspiration from the original. He added that director Ram helped with the script. The film began production in Chennai during November 2014, with a publicity poster revealing that debutant actor Vishagan Vanangamudi would portray the lead role. Bharathiraja revealed that he would play himself during the film's first half and stated that filming would take place in India and abroad in Switzerland. He also revealed that the film would not be a sequel, but would tell the story of a youngster who is affected to commit crimes after watching the original film. In January 2016, Manoj stated that work on the film had been postponed. Prior to the release of his directorial debut Margazhi Thingal in October 2023, Manoj noted that the remake was dropped and that "it felt like someone had cursed the project". Manoj died in 2025, precluding the project from ever being made.

== Legacy ==
The success of Sigappu Rojakkal inspired more films in Tamil about psychopathic killers such as Moodu Pani (1980), Kaadhal Kondein (2003), Manmadhan (2004) and Nadunisi Naaygal (2011). Footage from Sigappu Rojakkal was also used in Yugam (2012). The lyric "Kuththunka Yesamaan Kuththunka, Intha Ponnunkale Ippadithaan Kuthunka" from the song "Ivaluka Imsai Thaanka Mudiyala" in Kalakalappu (2012) was derived from the dialogue in Sigappu Rojakkal.
