= Veedu =

1988 film by Balu Mahendra

- Poster
- Directed by: Balu Mahendra
- Screenplay by: Balu Mahendra
- Story by: Akhila Mahendra
- Produced by: Kaladas
- Starring: Archana; Bhanu Chander
- Cinematography: Balu Mahendra
- Edited by: Balu Mahendra
- Music by: Ilaiyaraaja
- Production company: Sri Kala International
- Release date: 25 November 1988
- Running time: 108 minutes
- Country: India
- Language: Tamil

Veedu (transl. House) is a 1988 Indian Tamil-language drama film directed by Balu Mahendra. Starring Archana as the central character, it depicts the difficulties faced by a middle-class family in building a house. Apart from directing, Mahendra wrote the script, photographed and did the editing as well. The film score by Ilaiyaraaja earned critical acclaim. At the 35th National Film Awards, the film received two awards including one for the Best Tamil Film. Archana won the National Film Award for Best Actress for her role in this film. The film was also screened at the "Indian Panorama" of the International Film Festival of India in 1988.

== Plot ==
Sudha, a 22-year-old unmarried woman, lives in an apartment in Madras with her younger sister Indhu and grandfather Murugesan. She is engaged to her colleague Gopi. The owner of the tenement wants all the families to vacate the place as he intends to construct another building on the same site. Sudha's attempts to find an alternative house are unsuccessful as her family cannot afford the rent they fixed. At this juncture, Iyengar, one of her colleagues, advises her to start building a new house. Though initially hesitant, she decides to build a house after Iyengar motivates her. Sudha's grandfather already owns two construction sites on the outskirts of the city. They decide to construct the house on one of them and sell the other one to raise money. In addition, she also seeks a housing loan and pledges her jewels for money. During this time, Sudha gets introduced to a building contractor who drafts a plan for the house. To get the plan approved, they had to bribe a government official. By this time, unexpected rains halt construction, thereby inflating the cost. Though Gopi comes forward to provide financial assistance, Sudha declines, stating that his sister's marriage would be affected if he provided money.

A kind-hearted Mangamma, a construction worker, helps Sudha with the construction. When she realises the contractor is stealing materials from the site, she informs Sudha, which in turn leads to the contractor quitting. Mangamma, her supervisor, and Iyengar help Sudha during this time as the construction work resumes. Meanwhile, as the loan sanctioning gets delayed, Sudha seeks financial help from her superior. She becomes even more dejected to know that he is a womaniser. With all her funds exhausted, she decides to halt the construction. However, Gopi offers some assistance, and the work continues to progress further. An excited Murugesan visits the site alone on a Sunday and dies while returning home. Sudha becomes depressed over the situation. When the house is nearing completion and when Sudha and Gopi appraise each other, an official from the Metropolitan Water Authority arrives at the site and asks them how they can construct a house on land already acquired by the authority. In the end, Sudha is shown sitting in the panchayat office, and a voiceover states that she is seeking justice in the court.

== Cast ==
- Archana as Sudha
- Bhanu Chander as Gopi
- Chokkalinga Bhagavathar as Murugesan
- Sathya as Mangamma
- Indhu as Indhu
- Oru Viral Krishna Rao as a villager
- Rallapalli as the manager

== Production ==
According to Balu Mahendra, Veedu was inspired from his mother. He recalled in an interview that his mother started building a house when he was eight years old, which affected her psychologically. He cites, "She was not the same after that. She became temperamental. She forgot to laugh. She had no time to teach us or play with us. The changes confused me. Years later, Veedu brought this transformation to life." The childhood event affected Balu Mahendra, and he developed the script based on it. He opted to make the film in Tamil as he felt not many good films were made in Tamil cinema then. The filming began in 1987, coinciding with the International Year of Shelter.

Made on a shoestring budget of ₹12 lakh (worth ₹4 crore in 2021 prices), the film's central theme revolved around the struggle of a middle-class family to build a house. It also marginally focussed on the change in human behaviour and corruption. The story was credited to Balu Mahendra's wife Akhila Mahendra, while he wrote the screenplay, filmed and edited apart from directing the film. The film does not feature any soundtrack. Ilaiyaraaja, a Balu Mahendra regular, was signed as the composer. On the latter's request, he used portions of his composition from the album How to Name It? for the film score. Most of the sequences were narrated through jump cuts and montages, shot mostly using a hand-held camera. The final length of the film stood at 3,039 metres (9,970 ft).

== Reception ==
Although filming began in 1987, the film was released only a year after. It turned out to be a box-office failure but won critical acclaim. N. Krishnaswamy of The Indian Express wrote, "With Veedu, Balu Mahendra becomes the first auteur (author) in Tamil cinema [...] Balu Mahendra, always among the frontline directors in the South, has with Veedu set himself quite apart making it a tall order for others to bridge the gap". Balu Mahendra admitted that he did not expect the film to be a box-office success or a failure, but would have the satisfaction of having made a good film. Archana's portrayal as a middle-class woman fetched her a lot of accolades from the critics. Chokkalinga Bhagavathar, who played her grandfather, received equal praise. He was a strong contender for that year's National Film Award for Best Actor, but eventually lost to Kamal Haasan. At the 35th National Film Awards, the film won in two categories: Best Feature Film in Tamil, and Best Actress for Archana. The film was among the 16 films to be screened at the Indian Panorama section of the International Film Festival of India in 1988. Balu Mahendra won the Cinema Express Award for Best Director – Tamil. In 2002, the film was screened under the "Indian Summer" section of the Locarno Film Festival.

== Legacy ==
In a 2013 review, Ananda Vikatan called Veedu to be among the two films that took Tamil cinema to world cinema level. Further, it praised the film for highlighting the plight of Indian middle-class families and the political set up of the nation. It stated Veedu was one of the few Tamil films that scores good on both content and narration, and also appreciated Balu Mahendra's directorial skills. Critics praised the film for being more visual and Balu Mahendra's understanding of cinema as a visual medium. However, the magazine criticised the usage of background score in the film as it felt it lessened the impact of an otherwise good film. S. Theodore Baskaran in his The Eye of The Serpent: An Introduction To Tamil Cinema states that Veedu was a "striking departure" from the previous films of Mahendra, as it was devoid of commercial elements like dance, songs, fight and comedy sequences. While analysing Archana's characterisation, Baskaran noted Mahendra's penchant for strong characterisation of his female leads.

Mahendra had to construct a house which was mean to be a set for the house which was shown in the film. The building which was later fully constructed, now houses the film school started by Mahendra in 2007. In many interviews, Mahendra had claimed that Veedu and Sandhya Raagam were the only films that satisfied him the most as he made in these two the fewest mistakes and compromises. The negative of the film is lost. In September 2002, Veedu was screened as part of a six-day workshop jointly conducted by the Department of Journalism and Communication and the Mass Communication Alumni Association of the University of Madras; it focussed on the impact of cinema on society. The Tamil film 3BHK (2025), which followed the struggles of a family to purchase a three-bedroom house, was noted for its similarities to this film.

== Bibliography ==
- Baskaran, S. Theodore (2013). The Eye of the Serpent: An Introduction to Tamil Cinema. Westland. ISBN 978-93-83260-74-4.
- Dhananjayan, G. (2014). Pride of Tamil Cinema: 1931–2013. Blue Ocean Publishers. OCLC 898765509.
- "Indian Cinema 1988". Directorate of Film Festivals. p. 76. Archived from the original (PDF) on 4 March 2016.
