= Balu Mahendra =

Film director in Indian cinema (1939–2014)

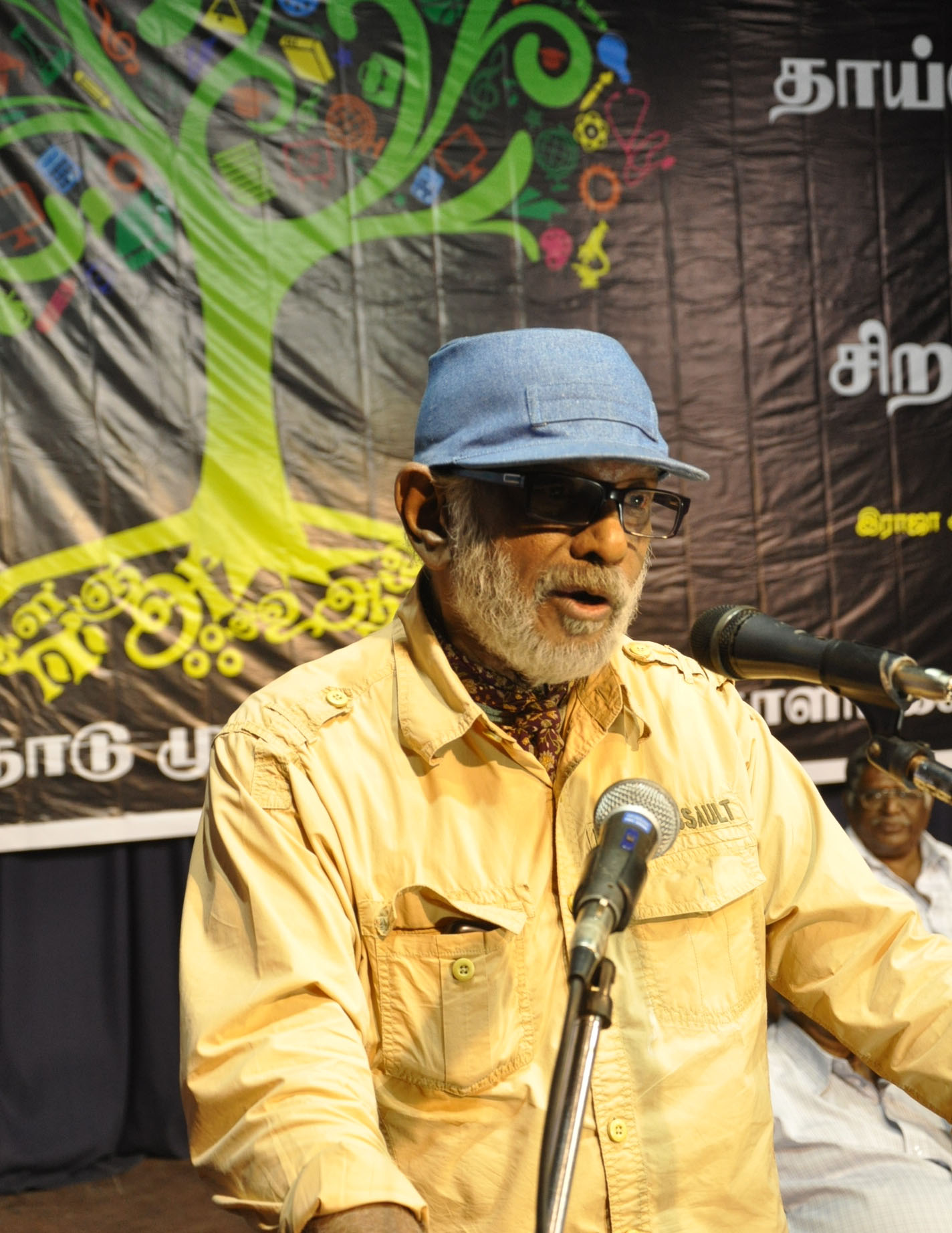
- Born: Balanathan Benjamin Mahendran; 20 May 1939; Batticaloa, British Ceylon
- Died: 13 February 2014 (aged 74); Chennai, Tamil Nadu, India
- Other names: Mahendra, Balu, Bala Mahendran
- Education: London University; Film and Television Institute of India
- Occupations: Cinematographer; director; screenwriter; actor; film editor
- Years active: 1971–2013
- Spouses: Ahileshwari (m. 1963); Shoba (m. 1978; died 1980); Mounika (m. 1998)
- Children: Shanki Mahendra

Balanathan Benjamin Mahendran (20 May 1939 – 13 February 2014), commonly known as Balu Mahendra, was a Sri Lankan Tamil cinematographer, director, screenwriter, actor and film editor who worked in various Indian film industries, primarily in Tamil and Malayalam cinema. Born in Sri Lanka, Mahendran developed a passion for photography and literature at a young age, after witnessing the shoot of David Lean's The Bridge on the River Kwai (1957) during a school trip in Sri Lanka, he was drawn towards filmmaking. After graduation he joined as an Aerial photographer in the Sri Lankan Government. In 1966, he moved to India and gained admission to the Film and Television Institute of India (FTII) to pursue a course in motion picture photography. Upon completion of his diploma, he started working in Malayalam cinema as a cinematographer in the early 1970s.

After working in over 20 films as a cinematographer, Mahendra made his directorial debut in 1977 with the Kannada film Kokila. In the following 36 years, he directed over 20 films. Along with Bharathiraja and Mahendran, he is regarded as a trendsetter in Tamil cinema. Widely regarded as an auteur, Mahendra usually scripted and edited his films in addition to shooting them. He was the recipient of six National Film Awards (including two for Best Cinematography), five Filmfare Awards South and several state government awards. During the tail end of his career, he established a film school in Chennai, which offers courses in cinematography, direction and acting. Following a brief phase of poor health, Mahendra died of cardiac arrest in February 2014.

== Early life ==
Mahendra was born on 20 May 1939 into a Sri Lankan Tamil Christian family in the village of Amirthakali near Batticaloa, British Ceylon (Sri Lanka). His father was a professor. Mahendra did his schooling at Methodist Central College and St. Michael's College National School. As a teenager, he was drawn towards films by his class teacher. It was during this time he happened to see Bicycle Thieves (1948) and Battleship Potemkin (1925). When he was in the sixth grade, he got an opportunity to witness the making of David Lean's The Bridge on the River Kwai (shot in Sri Lanka) during a school field trip. Inspired by Lean's personality, Mahendra determined to become a film-maker.

"I used to cut my cinematography classes and attend classes conducted in the departments of direction, screenplay writing and editing. However, I used to get the top rank in cinematography, so the professor did not mind my going to other classes. My main concern at that time was direction and scripting with a little bit of interest in cinematography."

— Mahendra in an interview with Frontline in 2013

Right from his childhood, Mahendra was interested in fine arts and literature. Upon completion of school, he joined the London University and graduated with a bachelor's degree (honours) in science. After his graduation, he worked as an Aerial Photographer in the Sri Lankan Government for a brief period during which he edited a Tamil literary magazine titled Thyen Aruvi. In Colombo, he worked as an amateur drama artist with Radio Ceylon and got acquainted with the Sinhala theatre groups.

Mahendra's passion for cinema prompted him to leave for India and join the Film and Television Institute of India, Pune in 1966. He had to take up cinematography as he could not gain admissions to other disciplines. At the institute he was exposed to world cinema as he got an opportunity to watch films made by François Truffaut and Jean-Luc Godard, both associated with the French New Wave movement. In 1969, Mahendra graduated from the institute with a gold medal.

== Film career ==
=== Debut as cinematographer ===
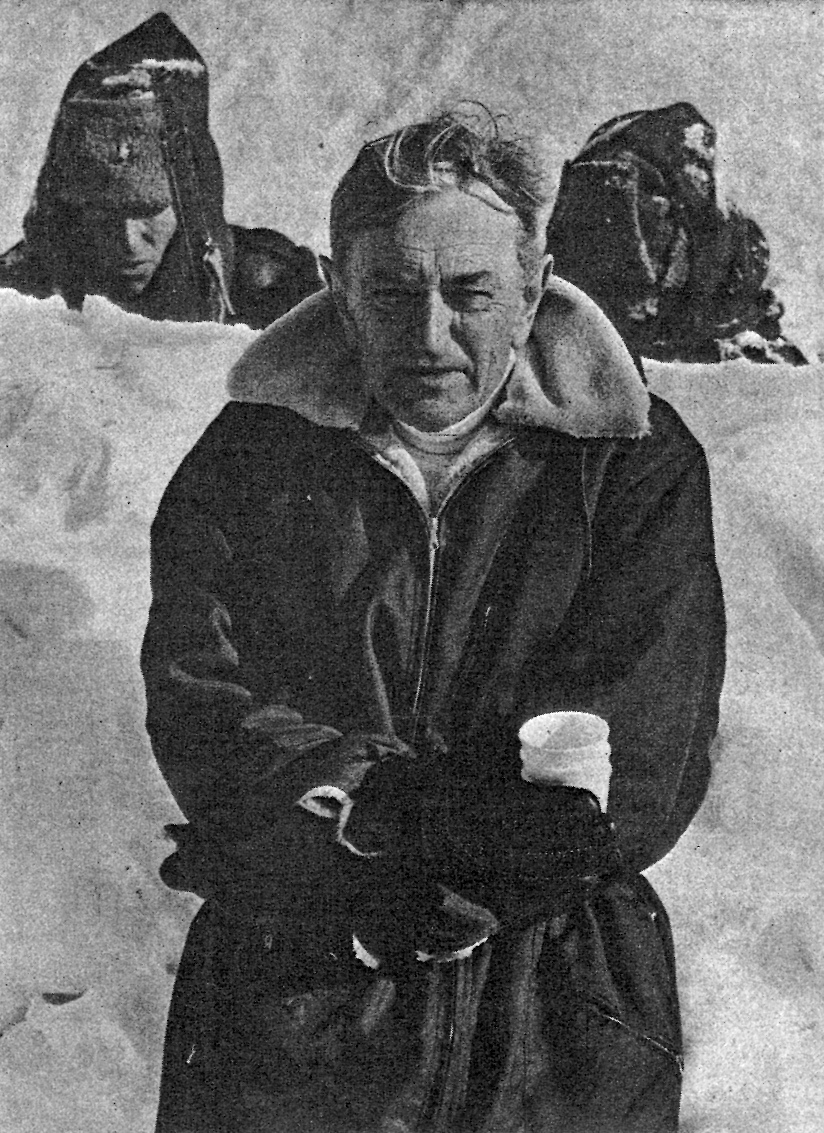
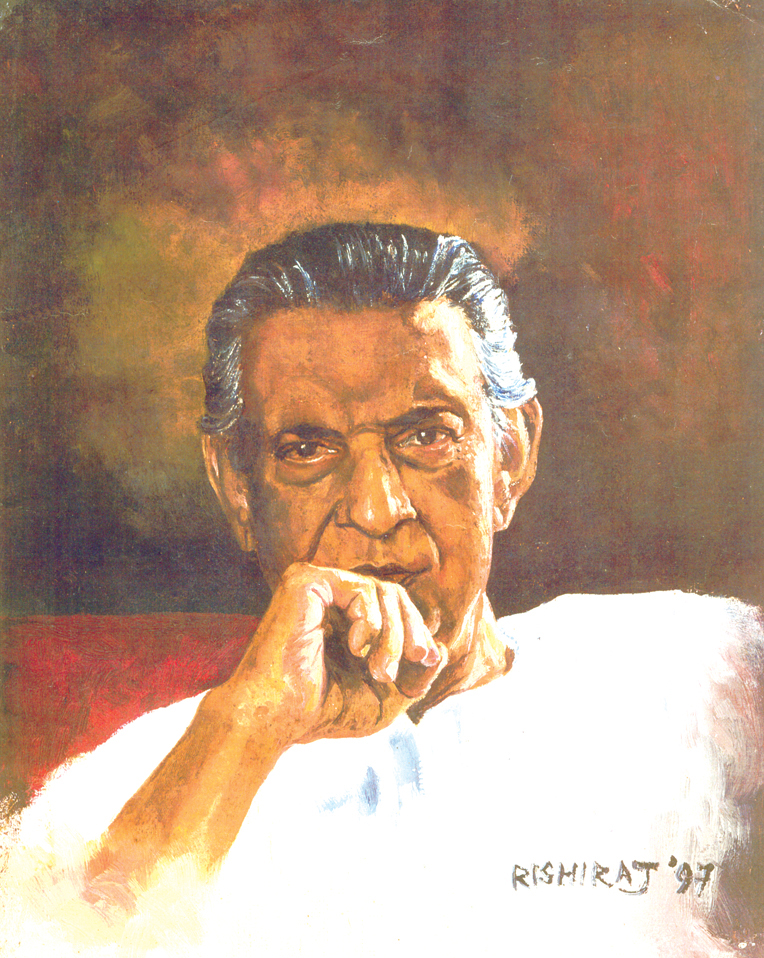
David Lean (left) and Satyajit Ray (right) are two of Mahendra's biggest inspirations to become a filmmaker.

As a fresh graduate from the FTII, Mahendra's early attempts to enter Sri Lankan Tamil cinema were unsuccessful. He got his first break as a cinematographer in 1971 in the Malayalam film Nellu. Ramu Kariat, the director of Nellu, was impressed by A View from the Fort, Mahendra's diploma film at the FTII. Though the filming of Nellu began in 1971, production delays postponed its release for three years. Meanwhile, Kariat signed up Mahendra for another film titled Maaya which released in 1972. However, P. N. Menon's Panimudakku (1972) got released before Maaya, thus becoming Mahendra's first release. He continued to work in Malayalam films such as Sasthram Jayichu Manushyan Thottu (1973), Kaliyugam (1973) and Chattakari (1974).

Nellu, shot in colour, won the Kerala State Film Award for Best Cinematography after it was released in 1974. Mahendra had continued successes with films such as Prayanam (1975) and Chuvanna Sandhyakal (1975), both fetching the state award for best photography to him for the second consecutive time. Between 1971 and 1976, he worked in about 20 films—mostly in Malayalam—as a cinematographer. The following year he made his directorial debut with Kokila. Made in Kannada, the film was a "triangular love story". In addition to a Best Screenplay award from the Karnataka government, Mahendra won his first National Film Award for Best Cinematography for the film. The film was both critically acclaimed and commercially successful. It was equally successful in the neighbouring state of Tamil Nadu and has the distinction of being the only Kannada film to complete 150 days in Madras (now Chennai) as of 2014.

=== Entry into Tamil films ===
Despite being a Tamil, it was not until 1978 he worked in a Tamil film when he signed up as the cinematographer for Mahendran's directorial debut Mullum Malarum (1978). Apart from handling the cinematography, Mahendra involved himself in other aspects such as screenwriting, casting, editing and direction in the film. After completing Mullum Malarum, Mahendra decided to work on his second directorial venture, this time in Tamil. He named the film Azhiyadha Kolangal (1979), which according to him was "partly autobiographical". Inspired from the 1971 American film Summer of '42, Azhiyadha Kolangal was a coming-of-age film that dealt with the story of three adolescent boys who are in the awakening of sexuality. Although it was controversial for its theme, it was a box-office success. During this time he did the cinematography of K. Vishwanath's Telugu film Sankarabharanam (1979) which turned out to be a major critical and commercial success.

Mahendra's third film as director Moodu Pani (1980) was loosely based on Alfred Hitchcock's 1960 film Psycho. Moodu Pani saw Mahendra collaborating with Ilaiyaraaja for the first time; Ilaiyaraaja was Mahendra's regular composer since then. In 1982, Mahendra made Moondram Pirai which had Kamal Haasan and Sridevi in the lead. The film told the story of a school teacher who looks after a girl suffering from amnesia. It had a 300-day run in the theatres and was labelled a "blockbuster". The film fetched two National Film Awards including an award for cinematography for Mahendra. The same year he made Olangal (1982) which marked his directorial debut in Malayalam. Inspired from Erich Segal's novel Man, Woman and Child, the film was a critical success. At the end of the year, Mahendra won two Filmfare trophies for directing Olangal and Moondram Pirai.

In 1983, Mahendra entered Hindi cinema with Sadma, a remake of Moondram Pirai, with Kamal Hasan and Sridevi reprising their roles. Mahendra received a Filmfare nomination for Best Story and became a well-known director with the Hindi audience with the film. The same year, he worked as the cinematographer of the Kannada film Pallavi Anu Pallavi, Mani Ratnam's debut film. During this time, he made his second film in Malayalam titled Oomakkuyil. Unlike Olangal, Oomakkuyil failed to create an impact among the audience.

=== Mainstream cinema and tryst with art film genre ===
During the mid 1980s, Mahendra concentrated on mainstream films. The first of which Neengal Kettavai (1984) was labelled an outright commercial picture. Later Mahendra noted that he made the film with a sole intention to prove critics that he could make commercial films. The following year, he collaborated with Rajinikanth to make Un Kannil Neer Vazhindal which turned out to be a commercial failure. He then worked on the Malayalam film Yathra (1985) with Mammooty in the lead role as a forest officer. The film was an adaptation of the 1977 Japanese classic The Yellow Handkerchief. Made with "artistic values" the film earned ₹1.9 million (equivalent to ₹31 million or US$320,000 in 2026) and ran for more than 200days in theatres and went on to become the highest-grossing Malayalam film of that year. By this time, he declined an offer to direct the Kannada film Malaya Marutha (1986). As a director who is known for making intense films, critics were surprised when he made Rettai Vaal Kuruvi (1987), a full-length comedy film. Closely based on the 1984 American film Micki and Maude, the film is regarded as one of the best comedies ever made in Tamil cinema during the decade. The film would serve as a base for his future films Marupadiyum (1993) and Sathi Leelavathi (1995) which explored similar themes.

Towards the end of the decade, Mahendra made two low-budgeted films—Veedu (1988) and Sandhya Raagam (1989). While Veedu focused on the life of a lower middle-class urban woman and her struggle to build a house, Sandhya Raagam dealt with "old age". At the 35th National Film Awards, Veedu won two National Film Awards—including one for Best Regional Film—and Sandhya Raagam won the Best Film on Family Welfare two years later. According to Mahendra, both the films were a tribute to his mother and father respectively. He named these two films as his best works as they were made with fewest mistakes and compromises.

In 1992, Mahendra made Vanna Vanna Pookkal which was produced by S. Dhanu. The film had a 100-day run and won the award for the "Best Regional Film" at the 39th National Film Awards. During this time M. Night Shyamalan, then a newcomer, approached Mahendra to be the cinematographer for his directorial debut Praying with Anger to which he refused. The next year, he remade Mahesh Bhatt's Arth in Tamil as Marupadiyum. Mahendra made the film as he felt it was close to his personal life. He then came up with a full-length comedy Sathi Leelavathi in 1995 which was produced by Kamal Haasan. The following year, he made a comeback in Bollywood through Aur Ek Prem Kahani, a remake of his Kannada film Kokila. He then made Raman Abdullah (1997), which deals with a friendship between two friends belonging to different religions. The film's shoot became the epicentre of a dispute that arose between the Tamil Film Producers Council and Film Employees Federation of South India (FEFSI). It was reported that members of FEFSI had stopped the filming of Raman Abdullah as Mahendra was engaging outside cast members in the film. This led FEFSI to go for an indefinite strike which affected to the delaying of several Tamil films. The film received negative reviews and failed at the box-office. He then attempted to make film titled Vaarayo Vennilave with Prabhu in the lead role, but the project was later dropped.

After Raman Abdullah, Mahendra took a break from films during which he made Kathai Neram, a television series based on different short stories, mostly by Sujatha. It was aired in Sun TV during the early 2000s.

=== Final years ===
Following a five-year sabbatical, he returned with Julie Ganapathi (2003). The film was based on the psychological thriller novel Misery by Stephen King. According to Mahendra, Julie Ganapathi was made on the lines of his previous films Moondram Pirai (1982) and Moodu Pani (1980). A review from Rediff.com stated, "Balu Mahendra has kept the flag of sensible cinema within the commercial format once again in his latest offering Julie Ganapathy" and rated the film as one of the best thrillers ever made. In spite of being a critical success, the film turned out to be a commercial failure. For his next film Adhu Oru Kana Kaalam (2005), he decided to cast Dhanush in the lead role. Initially he stated that the film to be an extension of his 1979 film Azhiyatha Kolangal. However, he ended up making a different film. The film was loosely based on his own Malayalam film Yathra released in 1985. When asked about the difference between the two films, he said "Yat[h]ra was the love story of two adults, this is the love story of two adolescents." Shobha Warrier of Rediff.com wrote that the film was "extremely disappointing".

In 2007, he started a film school named "Cinema Pattarai" in Chennai. The institute offers courses in disciplines such as cinematography, direction and acting. After a brief hiatus from films, he made a comeback through Thalaimuraigal (2013), which marked his acting debut. Apart from acting, he also scripted, directed, edited and served as the cinematographer of the film. The film was about the relationship between an ageing man and his grandson. The film received positive response with Mahendra's acting being well acclaimed. Malathi Rangarajan of The Hindu stated, "If Mahendra's aim was to make a film that can compete on a global level, Thalaimuraigal is a concrete step in that direction." Despite being critically acclaimed, the film was a commercial failure. At the 61st National Film Awards, it won the Nargis Dutt Award for Best Feature Film on National Integration.

== Personal life ==
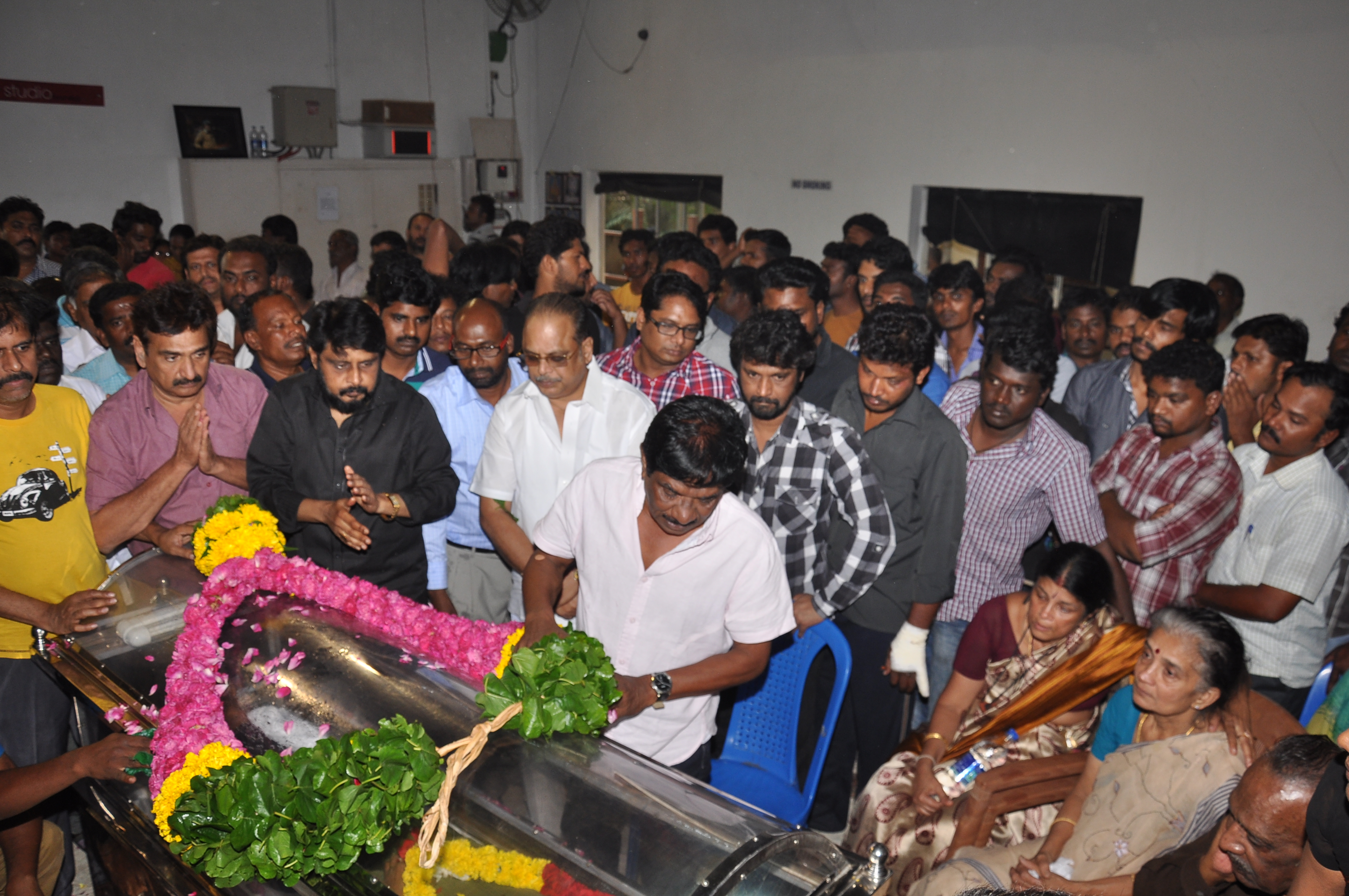
Bharathiraja and Mahendran attending the funeral

Mahendra was married three times. He was first married to Akhileshwari with whom he had a son. His relationship with actress Shoba ended in 1980 after she committed suicide following their marriage. Upon her death, the media speculated that Mahendra was responsible for her death. Following that, Mahendra wrote a series of "sentimental musings" in the Tamil magazine Kumudam under the title Shobavum Naanum (lit. Shoba and me). Their relationship was explored by K. G. George (Mahendra's junior at the FTII) in his 1983 Malayalam film Lekhayude Maranam Oru Flashback. When the film was released, Mahendra said that the film had nothing to do with him and has not discussed about it with George. In 1998, he married another actress Mounika and declared their marriage publicly in 2004.

Following a heart attack on 13 February 2014, Mahendra was admitted to Vijaya Hospital in Chennai where he was declared dead after six hours of cardiac arrest. Shortly after the news of his death, members of the Indian film industry posted their condolences in Twitter and Facebook. The Tamil film fraternity mourned the death and paid homage to him at his "film school" in Saligramam, Chennai, and decided not to work on the following day as a sign of respect. The last rites of Mahendra were performed at Porur crematorium on the same day.

== Style and legacy ==
As a photographer, Mahendra was inspired by the works of Néstor Almendros and Michael Chapman. Among his contemporaries, he admired the works of Ashok Kumar. Mahendra believed a "well-photographed movie is that which is very close to the script". As a film-maker, he claimed himself as belonging to the realistic way of story-telling devised by Satyajit Ray and Vittorio De Sica. Mahendra was drawn towards realistic cinema after watching Ray's Pather Panchali (1955). He is credited as being one among the earliest filmmakers to bring "naturalism" in Tamil cinema in the 1970s. He usually photographed, scripted and edited all his films. His films were characterised by strong "visual appeal" and minimal number of characters. A majority of his films centre on the complexity of human relationships and are known to portray women as strong characters. Although influenced by realism, his films Moodu Pani, Rettai Vaal Kuruvi and Julie Ganapathi heavily borrowed from American cinema.

Mahendra was equally praised for his cinematography and directorial finesse. Described by the media as "one of the finest cinematographers of Indian cinema", he was among the first to pioneer innovative colour in South India. Subrata Mitra, Satyajit Ray's cinematographer, presented a viewfinder to Mahendra acknowledging his talent. Fellow cinematographer Madhu Ambat described that it was Mahendra who gave "fame" to those cameramen who came out of the FTII, and further noted that he was one of the few film-makers who effectively used romantic realism. Lauded for usage of "natural lighting", Mahendra was considered "one of the few filmmakers in Tamil who believes in telling a story visually". Kamal Haasan described that he was one of the few directors who balanced between art and popular cinema. As a film-maker, he inspired contemporary actors and film-makers such as Mani Ratnam, Kamal Haasan and Sripriya, He has mentored next generation film-makers including Bala, Ameer, Vetrimaaran, Ram and Seenu Ramasamy. Cinematographers like Santosh Sivan, Ravi K. Chandran, Natty Subramaniam and K. V. Anand have taken inspirations from him. The negatives of his acclaimed films—Moodu Pani, Veedu, Sandhya Raagam, Marupadiyum and Sathi Leelavathi—are lost.

=== Collaboration With Ilaiyaraja ===
Balu Mahendra totally directed 23 films, in 5 languages. Except the first two films, he collaborated with Ilaiyaraja consecutively for 21 films. He intended to collaborate with Raja in the 6 films that he had already created before he died of cardiac arrest. While other directors never used Ilaiyaraja for their Hindi remakes, Balu Mahendra was steadfast in persisting with Ilaiyaraja, in all the languages. Their equation was symbiotic & synergetic, with Ilaiyaraja, churning out chart busters, for Balu Mahendra. A highlight of their creative bonding being, the eternal superhit Thumbi Vaa ..... from Olangal-1982, was used by them 5 times, in 4 languages [Mal-1, Tamizh-2, Tel-1 & Hin-1, apart from in Paa by R. Balki & a Vocal-Orchestra Symphony version, in Raja's Concert in Italy–2004, titled as Mood Kaapi.

== Awards and nominations ==
Awards and nominations received by Balu Mahendra
Year	Award	Category	Work(s)	Result
1974	Kerala State Film Award	Best Cinematography (colour)	Nellu	Won
1975	Kerala State Film Award	Best Cinematography (black-and-white)	Prayanam, Chuvanna Sandhyakal	Won
1977	National Film Awards	Best Cinematography (black-and-white)	Kokila	Won
1978	Nandi Awards	Best Cinematographer	Manavoori Pandavulu	Won
1979	Filmfare Awards South	Best Director (Tamil)	Azhiyatha Kolangal	Nominated
1982	National Film Awards	Best Cinematography (Colour)	Moondram Pirai	Won
1982	Filmfare Awards South	Best Director (Tamil)	Moondram Pirai	Won
1982	Filmfare Awards South	Best Director (Malayalam)	Olangal	Won
1982	Karnataka State Film Awards	Best Cinematography	Pallavi Anupallavi	Won
1983	Filmfare Awards	Best Story	Sadma	Nominated
1985	Filmfare Awards South	Best Director (Malayalam)	Yathra	Won
1986	Kerala State Film Award	Kerala State Film Award for Best Film with Popular Appeal and Aesthetic Value	Yathra	Won
1986	Nandi Awards	Best Cinematography	Nireekshana	Won
1986	Filmfare Awards South	Best Director (Telugu)	Nireekshana	Nominated
1987	National Film Awards	Best Feature Film in Tamil	Veedu	Won
1988	Filmfare Awards South	Best Director (Tamil)	Veedu	Won
1989	National Film Awards	Best Film on Family Welfare	Sandhya Raagam	Won
1991	National Film Awards	Best Feature Film in Tamil	Vanna Vanna Pookkal	Won
2013	National Film Awards	Best Feature Film on National Integration	Thalaimuraigal	Won
2013	61st Filmfare Awards South	Best Tamil Director	Thalaimuraigal	Nominated (Note: Nominated posthumously)
2013	61st Filmfare Awards South	Lifetime Achievement Award – South	—	Won (Note: Awarded posthumously)
2014	8th Vijay Awards	Vijay Award for Contribution to Tamil Cinema	—	Won
2017	Tamil Nadu State Film Awards	Best Story Writer	Thalaimuraigal	Won

== Filmography ==
=== As film director, cinematographer and editor ===
Year	Film	Language	Credited as			Notes
Year	Film	Language	Director	Cinematographer	Editor	Notes
1972	Panimudakku	Malayalam	✗	✓	✗	
1972	Maaya	Malayalam	✗	✓	✗	
1972	Nirthasala	Malayalam	✗	✓	✗	One Song
1973	Sasthram Jayichu Manushyan Thottu	Malayalam	✗	✓	✗	
1973	Abhimanavanthulu	Telugu	✗	✓	✗	
1973	Kaliyugam	Malayalam	✗	✓	✗	
1973	Chukku	Malayalam	✗	✓	✗	
1974	Nellu	Malayalam	✗	✓	✗	
1974	Rajahamsam	Malayalam	✗	✓	✗	
1974	Chattakari	Malayalam	✗	✓	✗	
1974	Jeevikkan Marannu Poya Sthree	Malayalam	✗	✓	✗	
1974	Makkal	Malayalam	✗	✓	✗	
1975	Raagam	Malayalam	✗	✓	✗	
1975	Prayanam	Malayalam	✗	✓	✗	
1975	Tourist Bungalow	Malayalam	✗	✓	✗	
1975	Chuvanna Sandhyakal	Malayalam	✗	✓	✗	
1975	Anuraagaalu	Telugu	✗	✓	✗	
1975	Cheenavala	Malayalam	✗	✓	✗	
1976	Missi	Malayalam	✗	✓	✗	
1976	Ponni	Malayalam	✗	✓	✗	
1976	Chennaaya Valarthiya Kutty	Malayalam	✗	✓	✗	
1976	America Ammayi	Telugu	✗	✓	✗	
1977	Tharam Marindi	Telugu	✗	✓	✗	
1977	Panthulamma	Telugu	✗	✓	✗	
1977	Kokila	Kannada	✓	✓	✗	
1978	Lambadolla Ramadasu	Telugu	✗	✓	✗	
1978	Mullum Malarum	Tamil	✗	✓	✗	
1978	Manavoori Pandavulu	Telugu	✗	✓	✗	
1979	Sommokadidhi Sokokadidhi	Telugu	✗	✓	✗	
1979	Ulkatal	Malayalam	✗	✓	✗	
1979	Azhiyadha Kolangal	Tamil	✓	✓	✗	
1980	Moodu Pani	Tamil	✓	✓	✗	
1980	Sankarabharanam	Telugu	✗	✓	✗	
1980	Kaliyuga Ravanasurudu	Telugu	✗	✓	✗	
1982	Moondram Pirai	Tamil	✓	✓	✗	
1982	Echchil Iravugal	Tamil	✗	✓	✗	
1982	Olangal	Malayalam	✓	✓	✗	
1983	Sadma	Hindi	✓	✓	✗	
1983	Pallavi Anu Pallavi	Kannada	✗	✓	✗	
1983	Oomakkuyil	Malayalam	✓	✓	✗	
1983	Urangatha Ninaivugal	Tamil	✗	✓	✗	
1984	Neengal Kettavai	Tamil	✓	✓	✗	
1985	Un Kannil Neer Vazhindal	Tamil	✓	✓	✗	
1985	Yathra	Malayalam	✓	✓	✗	
1986	Nireekshana	Telugu	✓	✓	✓	
1987	Rettai Vaal Kuruvi	Tamil	✓	✓	✓	
1988	Veedu	Tamil	✓	✓	✓	
1989	Sandhya Raagam	Tamil	✓	✓	✓	Also Producer
1992	Vanna Vanna Pookkal	Tamil	✓	✓	✓	
1992	Chakravyuham	Telugu	✓	✓	✓	
1993	Marupadiyum	Tamil	✓	✓	✓	
1995	Sathi Leelavathi	Tamil	✓	✓	✓	
1996	Aur Ek Prem Kahani	Hindi	✓	✓	✓	
1997	Raman Abdullah	Tamil	✓	✓	✓	
2001	En Iniya Ponnilave	Tamil	✓	✓	✓	
2003	Julie Ganapathy	Tamil	✓	✓	✓	
2005	Adhu Oru Kana Kaalam	Tamil	✓	✓	✓	
2013	Thalaimuraigal	Tamil	✓	✓	✓	Also actor

=== Television ===
- Kathai Neram (2000)

== Tribute ==
- Since 2015, the Norway Tamil Film Festival has presented an award in Balu Mahendra's name to recognize excellence in filmmaking.
- In 2018, writer Ajayan Bala established a library in Chennai named the BaluMahendra Library, dedicated to film literature and visual media.
- Since 2020, a library in Kilinochchi, Sri Lanka, has been named the Balu Mahendra Library as an initiative by young filmmakers and cinephiles, focusing on promoting film culture and education.

== Bibliography ==
- Baskaran, Sundararaj Theodre (2013). The Eye of the Serpent: An Introduction to Tamil Cinema. Westland. ISBN 978-93-83260-74-4. Archived from the original on 25 April 2016.
- Baskaran, Sundararaj Theodore (2009). History through the lens: perspectives on South Indian cinema. Orient Blackswan. ISBN 978-81-250-3520-6. Archived from the original on 24 April 2016.
- Dey, Ajoy Kumar (1982). IFSON, special issue, Filmotsav, '82. Federation of Film Societies of India. Archived from the original on 28 May 2016.
- Garga, Bhagwan Das (1996). So many cinemas: the motion picture in India. Eminence Designs. ISBN 978-81-900602-1-9. Archived from the original on 15 May 2016.
- Kindem, Gorham Anders (2000). The International Movie Industry. SIU Press. ISBN 978-0-8093-2299-2.
- Kumar, Keval J. (2000). Mass Communication in India (4th ed.). Jaico Publishing House. ISBN 978-81-7224-373-9. Archived from the original on 30 April 2016.
- Rajadhyaksha, Ashish; Willemen, Paul (1999). Encyclopaedia of Indian cinema. British Film Institute. ISBN 9780851706696.
- Ramachandran, T.M. (1982). Film World. Vol. 19. Archived from the original on 8 May 2016.
- Reed, Sir Stanley (1984). The Times of India Directory and Year Book Including Who's who. The Times Group. Archived from the original on 29 July 2020.
