= Vanna Vanna Pookkal =

- Poster
- Directed by: Balu Mahendra
- Written by: Balu Mahendra
- Produced by: Kalaipuli S. Thanu
- Starring: Prashanth; Mounika; Vinodhini
- Cinematography: Balu Mahendra
- Edited by: Balu Mahendra
- Music by: Ilaiyaraaja
- Production company: Subramaniya Films
- Release date: 15 January 1992
- Running time: 135 minutes
- Country: India
- Language: Tamil

Vanna Vanna Pookkal (transl. Colourful Flowers) is a 1992 Indian Tamil-language romantic drama film, directed by Balu Mahendra, starring Prashanth, Mounika and Vinodhini. The film, produced by Kalaipuli S. Thanu, was released on 15 January 1992, and won the National Film Award for Best Feature Film in Tamil at the 39th National Film Awards. The film completed a hundred-day run at the box-office.

== Plot ==
After saving Manoranjitham from killing herself in the forest, the kindhearted Siva brings her home to live in his house, much to the despair of his neighbor Shenbagam, who secretly loves him. Things become even more complicated when Siva falls in love with Manoranjitham and arranges for them to be married, but on the day of the wedding, she mysteriously disappears. Siva learns that Manoranjitham is going to die because of her serious health conditions. He finally finds her at her deathbed in the hospital where she dies. The film ends with Shenbagam comforting a grieving Siva.

== Cast ==
- Prashanth as Sivasubramani
- Mounika as Shenbagam
- Vinodhini as Manoranjitham
- Dubbing Janaki as Sivagami, Shenbagam's mother
- T. K. S. Chandran as Shenbagam's father
- Veeraraghavan as Manoranjitham's father
- Vaani as Manoranjitham's mother
- Radhabhai as Shenbagam's grandmother
- Adithya as Azhagiri
- Vijay
- Azhagu
- Suresh Chakravarthi
- Manavalan
- Suryakanthammal
- Indhu
- Sakunthala

== Soundtrack ==
The soundtrack was composed by Ilaiyaraaja, with lyrics written by himself, Vaali and Gangai Amaran. For the dubbed Telugu version Prema Paatam, all songs were written by Rajasri.

Tamil
No.	Title	Lyrics	Singer(s)	Length
1.	"Chinna Mani Koyililey"	Vaali	K. J. Yesudas	4:49
2.	"Ila Nenje Vaa"	Vaali	K. J. Yesudas	5:26
3.	"Dhirana Dhiranana"	Ilaiyaraaja	Mano	1:31
4.	"Kannamma Kadhal Ennum"	Ilaiyaraaja	Ilaiyaraaja, S. Janaki	4:35
5.	"Kozhi Koovum"	Gangai Amaran	S. P. Balasubrahmanyam, S. Janaki	4:41
6.	"Pangunikkapuram"	Gangai Amaran	K. S. Chithra, Ganesan	5:40
Total length:				26:42

Telugu
No.	Title	Singer(s)	Length
1.	"Kodi Koose Velalo"	S. P. Balasubrahmanyam, K. S. Chithra	4:54
2.	"Idi Chaithrama"	S. P. Balasubrahmanyam	5:33
3.	"Maatalu Nerchina Raachilaka"	K. S. Chithra	5:49
4.	"Mamathala Kovelalo"	S. P. Balasubrahmanyam	5:10
5.	"Emito"	S. P. Balasubrahmanyam, K. S. Chithra	5:00
Total length:			26:27

== Release and reception ==
Vanna Vanna Pookkal was released on 15 January 1992. C. R. K. of Kalki appreciated the film for the cinematography and music. The film completed a hundred-day run at the box-office, and won the National Film Award for Best Feature Film in Tamil.
