= Mohan Sharma =

Indian actor

- Born: Mohan Sharma; 1947 (age 78–79); Thathamangalam, Kerala, India
- Occupations: Actor; producer; director; screenwriter
- Years active: 1972–1985; 1998–Present
- Spouses: Lakshmi (m. 1975; div. 1980) Shanthi (m. 1982)
- Children: 1

Mohan Sharma is an Indian film and television actor, film producer, director and screenwriter, who works in South Indian films. He has produced more than 15 films in Malayalam, Telugu, Tamil and Kannada. He became noted through his role in Chattakari (1974).

== Background ==
Mohan Sharma was born in Thathamangalam in Palakkad district, Kerala. His education was completed at Thathamangalam and Chitoor of Palakkad. Afterwards, he joined the Film and Television Institute of India, Pune and graduated in the acting course. He was the first South Indian to get that qualification in acting from the institute. He served three times as National Film Jury member and once as Indian Panorama Jury member.

He fell in love with co-star Lakshmi on the sets of Chattakari and married her in 1975, but it ended in divorce in 1980. Later, he married in 1982 and has a son through his second marriage.Then he got divorced and remarried for the 3rd time to Shanthi, a bharatnatyam dancer in Chennai.

Despite leading more than 100 movies and being a close associate of J Jayalalitha, he is now in a retirement home, reportedly struggling financially.

== Awards ==
=== Kerala State Film Awards ===
- 2010 Best Story – Gramam

=== Tamil Nadu State Film Awards ===
- 2017 Tamil Nadu State Film Award Special Prize – Best Film

== Filmography ==
=== As an actor ===
==== Malayalam ====
- Khalifa (2026) as Aamir's grandfather
- Forensic (2020) as Abraham
- Mamangam (2019) as Zamorin
- Aakashamittayi (2017) as Swami
- Red Rain (2013)
- Mayamohini (2012) as Rajkumar Patala
- Gramam (2012) as Mani Swami
- Kalabham (2006)
- Chithariyavar (2005)
- Basket (2002)
- Kuberan (2002)
- Dada Sahib (2000) as Governor Rahmath Ali
- Kaanthavalayam (1980)
- Pratheeksha (1979)
- Kaayalum Kayarum (1979)
- Mathalasa (1979)
- Vyaamoham (1978)
- Agninakshathram (1977)
- Snehayamuna (1977)
- Saritha (1977)
- Sreemad Bhagavadgeetha (1977)
- Priyamvada (1976)
- Paalkkadal (1976)
- Njavalppazhangal (1976)
- Surveykkallu (1976)
- Muthu (1976)
- Missi (1976)
- Udyaanalakshmi (1976)
- Theekkanal (1976)
- Chuvanna Sandhyakal (1975)
- Thomasleeha (1975)
- Chalanam (1975)
- Prayanam (1975)
- Raagam (1975)
- Jeevikkaan Marannu Poya Sthree (1974)
- Chattakari (1974)
- Ashwathi (1974)
- Nellu (1974)
- Brahmachaari (1972)
- Panimudakku (1972) as Venu

==== Tamil ====
- Akkarai Pachai (1974)
- Nadakame Ulagam (1977)
- General Chakravarthi (1978)
- Enippadigal (1979)
- Thoondil Meen (1980)
- Nadhi Ondru Karai Moondru (1980)
- Uyirodu Uyiraga (1998)
- Kannedhirey Thondrinal (1998)
- Suyamvaram (1999)
- Appu (2000)
- Dosth (2001)
- Friends (2001)
- Raajjiyam (2002)
- Yai! Nee Romba Azhaga Irukke! (2002)
- Parthiban Kanavu (2003)
- Priyamaana Thozhi (2003)
- Sachien (2005)
- Thavam (2007)

==== Hindi ====
- Wafadaar (1985)
- Sur Sangam (1985)
- Dream Girl (1977)

==== Telugu ====
- Saagara Sangamam (1983)
- Veta (1986)

==== Kannada ====
- Sedina Hakki (1985)
- Ibbani Karagithu (1983)

=== Direction ===
- Gramam (Malayalam) 2012
- Namma Gramam (Tamil) 2012

=== Production ===
- Sedina Hakki (1985) (Kannada)
- Ivide Thudangunnu (1984) (Malayalam)
- Bandham (1983) (Malayalam)

=== Screenplay ===
- Graamam (2012) (Malayalam)

=== Story ===
- Graamam (2012) (Malayalam)
- Bandham (1983) (Malayalam)

=== Dialogue ===
- Graamam (2012) (Malayalam)

=== As a playback singer ===
- "Munnil Njaaninmel" ... Bandham 1983
- "Janichappozhe" ... Bandham 1983
- "Ennomal sodarikku" ... Ivide Thudangunnu 1984
- "Thaanaaro thannaaro" ... Ivide Thudangunnu 1984
- "Etho swapnam pole" ... Ivide Thudangunnu 1984
- "Neeyente jeevanaanomale" ... Ivide Thudangunnu 1984

== Television ==
Serial	Year	Role	Channel	Language
Appa	2003	Bommi Appan (Appa)	Sun TV	Tamil
Kolangal	2004–2009	Eshwaramoorthy	Sun TV	Tamil
Raja Rajeshwari	2005	Manthiravaathi (Cameo)	Sun TV	Tamil
Kanavarukkaga	2005-2006		Sun TV	Tamil
Varam	2006		DD Malayalam	Malayalam
Velutha Kathrina Kanalpoovu	2006–2007	Varghese	Kairali TV	Malayalam
Lucky	2006–2007	Gyan Prakash Sharma	Star Plus	Hindi
Daya	2007	Major	Kairali TV	Malayalam
Arasi	2008–2009	Judge Mohan Sharma	Sun TV	Tamil
Lakshmi	2007-2008		Sun TV	Tamil
Mudhanai Mudichu	2010–2012	Annamalai	Sun TV	Tamil
Sree Padmanabham	2013–2014	Ramabhadran Thirumeni	Amrita TV	Malayalam
Sakthi	2014	Rajagopal	Sun TV	Tamil
Vani Rani	2015	Vishwanathan	Sun TV	Tamil
Celebrity Kitchen	2015	Guest	Puthuyugam TV	Tamil
Mahalakshmi	2017-2018	Vishwanathan	Sun TV	Tamil
Maya	2018	Minister Thangapaandi	Sun TV	Tamil
Thalattu	2021–2023	Advocate Easwaramoorthi	Sun TV	Tamil
