= Rettai Vaal Kuruvi =

1987 film by Balu Mahendra

- Poster
- Directed by: Balu Mahendra
- Screenplay by: Balu Mahendra
- Story by: Gauri
- Produced by: Abdul Kader
- Starring: Mohan; Radhika; Archana
- Cinematography: Balu Mahendra
- Edited by: Balu Mahendra
- Music by: Ilaiyaraaja
- Production company: Saagar Combines
- Release date: 27 February 1987
- Country: India
- Language: Tamil

Rettai Vaal Kuruvi (transl. Two-tailed Sparrow) (Note: While "Rettai Vaal Kuruvi" correctly translates to "two-tailed sparrow", it is also a sly reference to Mohan's two-timing character.) is a 1987 Indian Tamil-language romantic comedy film directed, written and photographed by Balu Mahendra, starring Mohan, Radhika and Archana. It is based on the 1984 American film Micki & Maude. The film was released on 27 February 1987.

== Plot ==
The story sets back to the vintage Madras Presidency. Gopi works in the National TV Station under his handler Margabandhu, a confidant and good friend. Though Gopi has already been married to Thulasi, the rightful daughter of his aunt, he finds love in Radha, who is a reputed singer. Gopi swaps between the two consorts, and the film sets in a mood of hilarious, romantic journey. This goes on until it ends up in admitting both of the wives at a same hospital due to different reasons. He manages to cover up his secret love to be known from each other, which fails in the end. Finally, the film ends on a happy note sharing the lives between the trio and two beautiful little kids.

== Cast ==
- Mohan as Gopi
- Archana as Tulasi
- Radhika as Radha
- V. K. Ramasamy as S. Margabandhu
- Thengai Srinivasan as T. S. Vasan
- Senthamarai as T. S. Arumugham
- Usilai Mani
- Idichapuli Selvaraj
- Ilaiyaraaja as himself

== Soundtrack ==
The music was composed by Ilaiyaraaja. The song "Kannan Vanthu" is set in the Carnatic raga known as Natabhairavi, while "Raja Raja Chozhan" is set in Keeravani. This song involves a "switch from 12/8 to shuffle". For the dubbed Telugu version Rendu Thokala Pitta, all songs were written by Rajasri.

Tamil
No.	Title	Lyrics	Singer(s)	Length
1.	"Raja Raja Chozhan"	Mu. Metha	K. J. Yesudas	4:55
2.	"Kannan Vanthu"	Na. Kamarasan	S. Janaki	4:11
3.	"Suthanthiratha Vaangi Pattom"	Gangai Amaran	P. Jayachandran, K. S. Chithra, Saibaba	5:42
4.	"Thathedutha Muthu Pillai"	Mu. Metha	P. Susheela, K. S. Chithra	4:36
Total length:				19:24

Telugu
No.	Title	Singer(s)	Length
1.	"Naa Andamaina"	S. P. Balasubrahmanyam	4:40
2.	"Sandhyavela Paadinadi"	S. Janaki	4:20
3.	"Swatantraanni Tecchukunnam"	S. P. Balasubrahmanyam, S. P. Sailaja	5:47
Total length:			14:47

== Release and reception ==
Rettai Vaal Kuruvi was released on 27 February 1987. N. Krishnaswamy of The Indian Express wrote, "Mohan, Archana and Radhika carry themselves with ease. Balu's photography, as usual, is marked by chiaroscuro, play of light and shade." Jayamanmadhan of Kalki were surprised to see Balu Mahendra directing an A rated film while praising the performances of Mohan, Archana and Radhika, Mahendra's cinematography and Ilaiyaraaja's music, and concluded saying latter half of the film should be watched again by the censor board.

== Bibliography ==
- Sundararaman (2007) [2005]. Raga Chintamani: A Guide to Carnatic Ragas Through Tamil Film Music (2nd ed.). Pichhamal Chintamani. OCLC 295034757.
