= Marupadiyum =

1993 film by Balu Mahendra

- Poster
- Directed by: Balu Mahendra
- Screenplay by: Balu Mahendra
- Story by: Mahesh Bhatt
- Produced by: Ashwin Kumar
- Starring: Revathi; Nizhalgal Ravi; Arvind; Rohini
- Cinematography: Balu Mahendra
- Edited by: Balu Mahendra
- Music by: Ilaiyaraaja
- Production company: Ashwin International
- Release date: 14 January 1993
- Running time: 139 minutes
- Country: India
- Language: Tamil

Marupadiyum (transl. Again) is a 1993 Indian Tamil-language drama film written, filmed and directed by Balu Mahendra. The film stars Revathi, Nizhalgal Ravi, Arvind Swamy and Rohini. A remake of the 1982 Hindi film Arth, it focuses on Thulasi, a wife caught up in marital discord, and her life henceforth.

Marupadiyum was released on 14 January 1993. Revathi won the Filmfare Award for Best Tamil Actress for her performance.

== Plot ==
Thulasi, who grew up as an orphan girl and always dreamt of owning a house, becomes insecure when she finds that she and her husband, Muralikrishna, have to leave the apartment they rent. Murali giving her the keys of a new house proves to be a double-edged sword, as he is in love with another woman, Kavitha, with whom he earned the money (in the film industry) for the new apartment. While previously giving advice to her maid cheated on by her husband, now Thulasi finds herself in the same situation.

When Murali deserts Thulasi for Kavitha, she chooses to leave the apartment for a women's hostel with only ₹2,000 (equivalent to ₹16,000 or US$160 in 2026) that she had when she got married. She is helped by Gowrishankar, a singer, to overcome the difficulties of life as a single person, to find a job and to rely emotionally on herself. Gowrishankar and Thulasi become good friends. Gradually, Kavitha's mental instability worsens her fears and insecurity, even after Murali requests Thulasi to sign the divorce papers.

Gowrishankar falls in love with Thulasi and proposes to her. She rejects him, saying she is empty and cannot give him anything. Gowrishankar tries to persuade her saying that she cannot spend the rest of her life feeling miserable about the past and that she should try to find a new life for herself. Thulasi promises to think about it.

Thulasi's maid, whose only aim in life is to secure a good education for her daughter, has saved ₹1,000 (equivalent to ₹7,900 or US$82 in 2026) towards her school admission fees. She finds out that her drunk husband has stolen the money. Enraged, she searches for him only to find him spending all the money. She murders him, goes to the police station and confesses her crime. Worried about her daughter, she calls Thulasi who promises to take care of the daughter.

Upon the insistence of Kavitha's mother and her personal doctor, Thulasi personally assures Kavitha that she is not interested in Murali any more. However, Thulasi's attitude only convinces Kavitha that breaking Thulasi's marriage was a mistake. To escape from her feelings of guilt and insecurity, she breaks up with Murali. The latter tries to rekindle his relation with Thulasi, but he is rejected.

Thulasi continues to live with her maid's daughter and refuses to marry Gowrishankar saying that she has found a new meaning to life in being independent and being a mother to the child and marrying Gowrishankar will only weaken her. Gowrishankar accepts her decision, and wishes Thulasi well as she prepares to lead an independent life.

== Cast ==
- Revathi as Thulasi
- Nizhalgal Ravi as Muralikrishna
- Arvind as Gowrishankar
- Rohini as Kavitha
- Vinodhini as Thulasi's friend
- Suresh Chakravarthi as Suresh
- Sathya as the domestic help

== Production ==
Although Marupadiyum is a remake of the Hindi film Arth (1982), director and cinematographer Balu Mahendra described it as being "dangerously close to [his] own life." According to Rohini, he told her not to apply make-up to look fairer because of his preference for dark-skinned heroines who he considered were "more attractive and had different shades". Revathi initially wanted to play the role of the extramarital lover, but ultimately got the role of the wife.

== Soundtrack ==
The soundtrack was composed by Ilaiyaraaja. The song "Aasai Athigam" is set in the Carnatic raga known as Sindhu Bhairavi, "Ellorukum Nalla Kaalam" is set in Suddha Dhanyasi, and "Nalam Vazha" is set in Madhukauns. For the Telugu-dubbed version Director Gari Pellam, all songs were written by Rajasri.

Tamil
No.	Title	Lyrics	Singer(s)	Length
1.	"Aasai Athigam"	Ravi Bharathi	S. Janaki	4:59
2.	"Ellorukum Nalla Kaalam"	Vaali	K. J. Yesudas	3:32
3.	"Ellorum Sollum Pattu"	Vaali	S. P. Balasubrahmanyam	4:53
4.	"Nalam Vaazha"	Vaali	S. P. Balasubrahmanyam	4:59
5.	"Nallathor Veenai"	Bharathiyar	S. Janaki	4:24
Total length:				22:47

Telugu
No.	Title	Singer(s)	Length
1.	"Ninne Kalavani"	S. Janaki	5:15
2.	"Antaanu Okamaata"	S. P. Balasubrahmanyam	5:10
3.	"Ee Vela"	S. P. Balasubrahmanyam	5:16
4.	"Ide Nizam"	K. J. Yesudas	3:42
5.	"Naa Mano Veena"	S. Janaki	4:42
Total length:			24:05

== Release and reception ==
Marupadiyum was released on 14 January 1993. Malini Mannath of The Indian Express wrote that the film "looks more like a second-hand import of another man's experiences, told more beautifully no doubt, but not with equal finesse". K. Vijiyan of New Straits Times wrote that it is "a slow-moving movie, not to be attempted when you are tired or sleepy." Kalki's critic applauded Mahendra's direction and Rohini's hysteria-based performance as new to Tamil cinema, but gave the film an overall mixed review. At the 41st Filmfare Awards South, Revathi won the Filmfare Award for Best Tamil Actress for her performance. No print of the film is known to survive, but it is still available on home video.

== In popular culture ==
The song "Aasai Adhigam" was featured in the 2019 film Kaithi where it became viral in Tamil Nadu after its release.

== Bibliography ==
- Sundararaman (2007) [2005]. Raga Chintamani: A Guide to Carnatic Ragas Through Tamil Film Music (2nd ed.). Pichhamal Chintamani. OCLC 295034757.
