= Thalaimuraigal =

2013 Indian film by Balu Mahendra

- Theatrical release poster
- Directed by: Balu Mahendra
- Written by: Balu Mahendra
- Produced by: Sasikumar; Balu Mahendra
- Starring: Master Karthik; Balu Mahendra
- Cinematography: Balu Mahendra
- Edited by: Balu Mahendra
- Music by: Ilaiyaraaja
- Production company: Company Productions
- Distributed by: Cinema Pattarai
- Release date: 20 December 2013
- Country: India
- Language: Tamil

Thalaimuraigal (transl. Generations) is a 2013 Indian Tamil-language drama film written, photographed, edited, and directed by Balu Mahendra. Produced by Sasikumar's Company Productions and Mahendra's Cinema Pattarai, the film has Master Karthik and Mahendra, while Sashikumar Subramani, Ramya Shankar, and Vinodhini Vaidyanathan appear in supporting roles and Sasikumar in a cameo appearance. The film's score was composed by Ilaiyaraaja, and the film released on 20 December 2013. At the 61st National Film Awards, it won the Nargis Dutt Award for Best Feature Film on National Integration. This was Mahendra's last directorial film before his death in 2014.

== Plot ==
Subbu is an elderly retired Tamil teacher who bleeds the ancient language in every word he says and in his ideals, but most importantly he despises the English language. He has been estranged from his son Dr. Sivaraman for over a decade after he married a Christian woman named Stella, who does not initially speak Tamil.

One day, Subbu suffers a stroke, and on the insistence of Stella, Sivaraman visits the village to find his younger sister pregnant and also meets his half-sister. Over time, Subbu becomes more welcoming of Sivaraman, and soon, Sivaraman brings Stella and his son Adithya to the village to meet his father. Adithya is highly curious of the village atmosphere, having been raised in Chennai and not being able to speak any Tamil.

When Aditya first arrives, Subbu is heartbroken to discover that Aditya does not speak any Tamil and that his son and daughter-in-law communicate exclusively in English. He soon accepts his daughter-in-law and builds a connection with his grandson, educating him in Tamil and teaching him the values of the culture. Aditya soon learns to speak fluent Tamil, and slowly his innocence and curiosity lead Subbu to take a kinder view of city life and other prejudices.

One day, Subbu and Aditya play in the rain, but suddenly, Subbu suffers a heart attack and dies the next day. 10 years later, Aditya is a successful doctor and goes on stage to receive an award. When asked about his grandfather, he tears up and opts not to continue his speech.

== Cast ==
- Master Karthik as Aditya
- Balu Mahendra as Subbu
- Sashikumar Subramani as Sivaraman
- Ramya Shankar as Stella
- Vinodhini Vaidyanathan as Sivaraman's sister
- Sasikumar as Dr. Adithya (cameo)
- Pasi Sathya
- Rail Ravi

== Production ==
In 2013, Balu Mahendra announced that he would direct Thalaimuraigal. The film was made in 50 days on a shoestring budget of under ₹1 crore (worth ₹1.9 crore in 2021 prices). Apart from directing, Mahendra revealed that he would play a pivotal role in the film. Besides, Sasikumar who produced this film would appear in a cameo appearance. Ramya Shankar, who appeared in the television series Saravanan Meenatchi, was selected to play the mother of 10-year-old. Child actor Karthik, who earlier appeared in Ethir Neechal, was selected as the 10-year-old. Sashikumar Subramani, who earlier appeared in Mahendra's television series Kathai Neram and also played the roles of Rambha's brother in Anandham and Atul Kulkarni's brother in the Dhanush-starrer Padikkadavan, was selected to play an important role. Vinodhini Vaidyanathan, who acted in films like Engaeyum Eppothum and Varuthapadatha Valibar Sangam, was signed to play Mahendra's daughter. The film was shot entirely with Canon EOS 5D, a still camera, and the score was composed by Ilaiyaraaja.

== Release ==
Thalaimuraigal was released on 20 December 2013. In contrast to two other Tamil releases that week, Biriyani and Endrendrum Punnagai which received more "pre-release buzz" and screens, trade journalists were sceptical of Thalaimuraigal due to its "off-beat" nature and the fact that it was released in fewer screens.

=== Critical reception ===
M. Suganth of The Times of India gave 4 stars out of 5 and wrote, "there is plenty of genuineness and warmth, which, elevated by the minimalist storytelling and genteel performances turn this simple film into the feel-good film of the year". S Saraswathi of Rediff.com gave 3.5 stars out of 5 and wrote, "Thalaimuraigal is a heartwarming tale of a grandfather coming to terms with his own conservative values and beliefs, while at the same time instilling in his grandson, a sense of pride and appreciation in his language and culture". Malathi Rangarajan of The Hindu wrote, "If Mahendra's aim was to make a film that can compete on a global level, Thalaimuraigal is a concrete step in that direction". Sify wrote, "Thalaimuraigal is well crafted movie that strikes a chord and is a heart-warming story of a relationship between a grandfather and his grandson".

=== Accolades ===
At the 61st National Film Awards, Thalaimuraigal won the Nargis Dutt Award for Best Feature Film on National Integration.
