= List of Tamil films of 1980 =

Post-amendment to the Tamil Nadu Entertainments Tax Act 1939 on 1 April 1958, Gross jumped to 140 per cent of Nett Commercial Taxes Department disclosed ₹21.92 crore in entertainment tax revenue for the year.

The following is a list of films produced in the Tamil film industry in India in 1980, in alphabetical order.

== 1980 ==
Date	Title	Director	Producer	Music	Cast
12 January	Aayiram Vaasal Idhayam	A. Jagannathan	Selvam Arts	Ilaiyaraaja	Sudhakar, Radhika, Roja Ramani, Thengai Srinivasan
26 January	Rishi Moolam	S. P. Muthuraman	S. S. K. Films	Ilaiyaraaja	Sivaji Ganesan, K. R. Vijaya
28 January	Billa	R. Krishnamurthy	Suresh Arts	M. S. Viswanathan	Rajinikanth, Sripriya, Helen, K. Balaji
29 February	Deiveega Raagangal	A. Veerappan	Aachi Cine Arts	M. S. Viswanathan	Srikanth, Vadivukkarasi, Roja Ramani
14 May	Avan Aval Adhu	V. Srinivasan	Maya Arts	M. S. Viswanathan	Sivakumar, Lakshmi, Sripriya, Thengai Srinivasan, Manorama
16 May	Yamanukku Yaman	D. Yoganand	Lakshmi Narasimha Pictures	K. Chakravarthy	Sivaji Ganesan, Sripriya
	Andharangam Oomaiyanathu	G. Premkumar	Lankal Films	K. J. Joy	Sarath Babu, Jose, M. G. Soman, Roopa, Rajani Sharma, Jayamalini, Jalaja, Suruli Rajan
	Anna Paravai	R. Pattabhiraman	Thiru Vadapalani Films	R. Ramanujam	Latha, Srikanth, Sudhakar, Radhika
4 June	Anbukku Naan Adimai	R. Thyagarajan	Devar Films	Ilaiyaraaja	Rajinikanth, Rathi, Vijayan, Sujatha, Thengai Srinivasan
	Ariyaa Paruvathile	Unknown	New Era Combines	Nickolas Raja	Vadivukkarasi
	Avalukkagave Naan	M. Thiruvengadam	Vyas N Rose Movies	Madurai Somu, Hareram	Sivakumar, Rathi Devi
	Azhaithal Varuven	P. R. Somu	R. R. Arts	M. S. Viswanathan	Sudhakar, Sumalatha, Vadivukkarasi, Suruli Rajan
12 June	Bhama Rukmani	R. Bhaskaran	Sri Kamakshi Amman Movies	M. S. Viswanathan	K. Bhagyaraj, Radhika, Praveena, Nagesh
	Bombay Mail 109	T. P. Sundaram	Alarmelumanga Productions	M. S. Viswanathan	Ravichandran, Sangeetha, V. K. Ramasamy, Thengai Srinivasan, Jayamalini, Abarna
	Chinna Chinna Veedu Katti	Yuvaraja	Sri Amman Creations	Shankar–Ganesh	Sudhakar, Babitha (Anu), Vijayan
	Chinnajiru Kiliye	K. Chandra Bose	Sunrise Enterprises	G. K. Venkatesh	Sudhakar, Radhika, Suruli Rajan
26 April	Dharma Raja	M. A. Thirumugam	Vijayavel Films	M. S. Viswanathan	Sivaji Ganesan, K. R. Vijaya, K. Balaji, Thengai Srinivasan
	Edhir Veettu Jannal	Kalaignanam	Bhairavi Creation	Shankar–Ganesh	Sudhakar, Radhika, Suruli Rajan, Manorama
	Ellam Un Kairasi	M. A. Thirumugam	Santhi Cine Paradise	Ilaiyaraaja	Rajinikanth, Seema, Sowcar Janaki, Major Sundarrajan
	Enga Ooru Rasathi	N. S. Rajendran	Ravi Combines	Gangai Amaran	Sudhakar, Radhika, Ambika, Goundamani
	Engal Vadhiyar	Durai	Radhakrishna Combines	M. S. Viswanathan	Nagesh, Srikanth, Kavitha, Jayamalini, V. K. Ramasamy, Thengai Srinivasan, Suruli Rajan
	Geetha Oru Shenbagapoo	S. A. Kannan	Rajeswari Movies	M. S. Viswanathan	Jai Ganesh, Srikanth, Subhashini, Lavanya, Suruli Rajan, Manorama
	Geethavin Roja		Vijithaa Art Pictures	M. L. Srikanth	Jai Ganesh
	Gramathu Athiyayam	C. Rudhraiya	Kumar Arts	Ilaiyaraaja	Chandrahasan, Nandakumar, Krishnakumari
	Guru	I. V. Sasi	Sivasakthi Films	Ilaiyaraaja	Kamal Haasan, Sridevi, R. Muthuraman
	Idhayaththil Ore Idam	Prashath	Sri Hariharan Films	Ilaiyaraaja	Srikanth, Radhika
	Ilamai Kolam	N. Venkatesh	G. V. P Creations	Ilaiyaraaja	Suman, Pratap K. Pothen, Radhika
	Inaindha Dhuruvangal	K. S. Gopalakrishnan	Vohra Films	V. Kumar[01]	R. Muthuraman, K. R. Vijaya
	Ivargal Vidhiyasamanavargal	Moulee	Mangaadu Amman Creation	M. S. Viswanathan	
	Jamboo	M. Karnan	Indhrani Films	Shankar–Ganesh	Jaishankar, Jayamala, Jayavani, Praveena, Major Sundarrajan, Thengai Srinivasan, Manorama
	Johnny	Mahendran	K. R. G. Films	Ilaiyaraaja	Rajinikanth, Sridevi, Deepa, Suruli Rajan
	Kaadu	Durai	Golden Harvest Productions	Shankar–Ganesh	Sathar, Vanitha, Bharathi Mohan
	Kaalam Badhil Sollum	Amirtham	Karumari Films	M. S. Viswanathan	Jaishankar, Manjula
	Kaali	I. V. Sasi	Hem Nag Films	Ilaiyaraaja	Rajinikanth, Vijayakumar, Seema, Fatafat Jayalaxmi
	Kadhal Kadhal Kadhal	M. A. Kaja	Udhayam Productions	Shankar–Ganesh	A. V. Ramanan, Deepa, Suruli Rajan
	Kadhal Kiligal	A. C. Tirulokchandar	Arunodhaya Films	K. V. Mahadevan	Sivakumar, Rathi
	Kallukkul Eeram	P. S. Nivas	Neelima Movie Makers	Ilaiyaraaja	Sudhakar, Bharathiraja, Aruna, Vijayashanti, Vennira Aadai Nirmala
	Kannil Theriyum Kathaikal	Devaraj–Mohan	Raja Meenakshi Films	K. V. Mahadevan, Ilaiyaraja, G. K. Venkatesh, Shankar–Ganesh, Agathiyar	Sarath Babu, Sripriya, Vadivukkarasi
	Karadi	T. K. Mohan	Poornima Creations	Gangai Amaran	M. G. C. Sukumar, Vijaya Geetha, Suruli Rajan
	Karumbu Vil				
	Kumari Pennin Ullathile	Ra. Sankaran	Surendras Art International	Shankar–Ganesh	K. Bhagyaraj, Vijayan, Radhika, Vijay Babu, Suruli Rajan
	Kuruvikoodu	P. Madhavan	Manimekalai Pictures	K. V. Mahadevan	Sivakumar, Saritha, Suruli Rajan
	Madhavi Vandhal	Nathigam Ramaswamy	The Nathigam Pictures	Chandrabose	
	Malargale Malarungal	Babu	Bhavana Films	Gangai Amaran	Sudhakar, Vijayan, Radhika, Vanitha
	Malargindra Paruvathile		Rajapriya Combines	K. V. Mahadevan	
	Mangala Nayagi	Krishnan–Panju	J. C. Chowdry Arts	V. Kumar	K. R. Vijaya, Sarath Babu, Sivachandran, Nisha, Sri Geetha, 'Baby' Shobana
	Manmatha Rathangal	K. Shankar	Nahar Movies	K. V. Mahadevan	
	Maria My Darling	Durai	Durgeswari Films	Shankar–Ganesh	Kamal Haasan, Sripriya, Thengai Srinivasan
	Mattravai Neril	Moulee	Ponmalar Arts	Shyam	Vijayan, Jaya Devi
	Mazhalai Pattalam	Lakshmi	Kalaikoodam Productions	M. S. Viswanathan	Vishnuvardhan, Sumithra
	Meenakshi	Rama Narayanan	Devipriya Movies	Shankar–Ganesh	Vijayan, Vijay Babu, Smitha
	Megathukkum Dhagam Undu	S. Jagadeesan	P. S. V. Pictures	M. S. Viswanathan	Sarath Babu, Rajani Sharma, Suruli Rajan
	Moodu Pani	Balu Mahendra	Raja Cine Arts	Ilaiyaraaja	Pratap K. Pothen, Shoba, Mohan
	Murattu Kaalai	S. P. Muthuraman	AVM Productions	Ilaiyaraaja	Rajinikanth, Jaishankar, Rathi, Sumalatha, Suruli Rajan
	Muyalakku Moonu Kaal	V. C. Guhanathan	S. P. V. Films	Chandrabose	Bhanu Chander, Nisha, Suruli Rajan, Vijay Babu, Sathyapriya, Manorama, V. K. Ramasamy, Vennira Aadai Moorthy, Sachu
	Muzhu Nilavu	Udumalai Chandran	Shanthi Nikethan Productions	Shankar–Ganesh	Jai Ganesh, Srikanth, Sangeetha, Lakshmisri
	Naan Naaney Than	P. Madhavan	Ramya Chithra Productions	K. V. Mahadevan	Rajesh, Vadivukkarasi
	Naan Potta Savaal	Puratchidasan	Kanaka Saranga Films	Ilaiyaraaja	Rajinikanth, Reena, Suruli Rajan, Manorama
	Nadhiyai Thedi Vandha Kadal	B. Lenin	Radha Arts	Ilaiyaraaja	Jayalalitha, Sarath Babu, Srikanth, Jamila
	Nandri Karangal	K. S. Gopalakrishnan	Solar Combines	Shankar–Ganesh	Srividya, Vanitha, Thengai Srinivasan
	Natchathiram	Dasari Narayana Rao	Sri Samundeswari Combines	Shankar–Ganesh	Sripriya, Mohan Babu, Sivachandran, Manorama
	Neer Nilam Neruppu	K. S. Gopalakrishnan	Kangadhara Pictures	Sahnkar–Ganesh	Sujatha, Vijay Anand, Y. G. Mahendra, Vanitha
	Neerottam	Jaichandar	T. M. Movies	A. V. Ramanan	Vijayakanth, Thirumurugan, Padmapriya, Praveena
	Nenjathai Killathe	Mahendran	Devi Films	Ilaiyaraaja	Suhasini, Sarath Babu, Pratap K. Pothen, Mohan
	Nijangal Nilaikkindrana	Govindan	Vijayaraji Pictures	Shankar-Ganesh	
	Nizhalgal	Bharathiraja	Manoj Creations	Ilaiyaraaja	Rajasekharan, Rohini, Nizhalgal Ravi, Chandrasekhar, Suveetha
	Oli Pirandhadhu	Durai	Sunitha Cine Arts	Shankar–Ganesh	Vijayan, Menaka, Suruli Rajan
	Oomai Kanavu Kandal	Vijayaraja	Mansoor Movies	Shankar–Ganesh	Thirumurugan, M. S. Vasanthi, Meera, Y. G. Mahendra, Sukumari
	Ore Mutham	C. A. Mugilan	S. V. S. A. V. M. Cine Arts	Ilaiyaraaja	Jai Ganesh, Sumithra, Srikanth
	Oru Iravu Oru Paravai	P. C. Reddy	Eswari Chithra Productions	Ilaiyaraaja	Vijayakumar, Latha, Sarath Babu
	Oru Kai Osai	K. Bhagyaraj	Ammulu Productions	M. S. Viswanathan	K. Bhagyaraj, Ashwini
	Oru Marathu Paravaigal	Ra. Shankaran	Jayavel Productions	Shankar–Ganesh	Jai Ganesh, Sripriya
	Oru Thalai Ragam	E. M. Ibrahim; T. Rajendar	Mansoor Creations	T. Rajendar	Shankar, Roopa, Raveendran, Chandrasekhar, Usha Rajendar
	Oru Velladu Vengaiyagiradhu	Devaraj–Mohan	Sathya Movies	M. S. Viswanathan	Sivakumar, Saritha, Thengai Srinivasan
	Othayadi Paathayilae	A. S. Prakasam	S. V. R. Enterprises	Shankar–Ganesh	Ganesh, Pournami
	Panam Penn Pasam	M. A. Kaja	Murali Karthikeyan Pictures	Shankar–Ganesh	R. Muthuraman, Vijayan, Saritha, Vadivukkarasi
	Paruvathin Vasalile	Kiruba Shankar	Sri Suryalaya Creations	Gangai Amaren	Vijay Babu, Radhika
	Polladhavan	V. Srinivasan	Vidhya Movies	M. S. Viswanathan	Rajinikanth, Lakshmi, Sripriya
	Ponnagaram	K. S. Mathangan	True Films	Shankar–Ganesh	Sarath Babu, Shoba
	Pennukku Yaar Kaaval	Durai	LakshmiJyothi Films	Ramesh Naidu	Vijayakumar, Sumithra
	Porkkaalam	Durai	Kasthuri Enterprises	Shankar–Ganesh	M. G. C. Sukumar, Vijayan, Sathyakala, Vanitha
	Poottaatha Poottukkal	Mahendran	Sri Sarasalaya Productions	Ilaiyaraaja	Jayan, Charulatha, Sundar, Archana
	Pournami Nilavil	M. A. Kaja	Umapriya Creations	Shankar–Ganesh	Vijayan, M. S. Vasanthi
	Pudhiya Thoranangal	M. Karnan	Valli Velan Movies	Shankar–Ganesh	Sarath Babu, Madhavi
	Rakaala Paravaigal	NOT KNOWN	Chinnalapatti Sakthivel	P. Sreenivasan	Chakravarthy, Suman, Praveena, V. K. Ramasamy
	Raman Parasuraman	M. S. Gopinath	Suresh Fine Arts	Sathyam	Sivakumar, Latha, Rathi
	Ramayi Vayasukku Vandhutta	V. Alagappan	Sri Durga Combines	Gangai Amaran	Udhayashankar, Menaka
	Ratha Paasam	K. Vijayan	Sivaji Productions	M. S. Viswanathan	Sivaji Ganesan, Sripriya, Jayachitra, Mohan Babu
		bvn			
25 December	Rusi Kanda Poonai	G. N. Rangarajan	Panchu Arts	Ilaiyaraaja	Sudhakar, Saritha, Latha, M. R. Radha
	Samanthipoo	K. S. Mathangan	Anand Creation	Malaysia Vasudevan	Sivakumar, Shoba
	Santhana Malargal	J. Ramu	Nagavelankanni Creations	Gangai Amaran	Sudhakar, Radhika
	Saranam Ayyappa	Dasarathan	Amudeshwari Films	Chandrabose	Jayabharathi, Vijayan, Radha Ravi
	Savitri	Bharathan	Lena Productions	M. S. Viswanathan	Vinod, Menaka
	Soolam	M. Bhaskar	Oscar Movies	Ilaiyaraaja	Rajkumar, Ponni
	Soundaryame Varuga Varuga	C. V. Sridhar	Sri Bharani Chithra Enterprises	Vijaya Bhaskar	Sivachandran, Sripriya
	Sridevi	Balaji	U. M. Productions		Vijayan, Vijay Babu, Saritha, Vanitha Sri
	Sujatha	Mohan	Sujatha Cine Arts	M. S. Viswanathan	Vijayan, Saritha, Shankar, Rajyalakshmi, Raveendran
	Thai Pongal	M. G. Vallabhan	Anjaneya Combines	Ilaiyaraaja	Vijayan, Chakravarthy, Radhika, Saritha
	Theneer	Jayabharathy	Vaigarai Films Pvt Ltd	Gangai Amaran	
	Thanimaram	Durai	Jayadevi Movies	Shankar–Ganesh	Rajesh, Nalini, Suruli Rajan
	Tharayil Pootha Malar	Jai Durai	Vengarai Amman Creations	Gangai Amaran	Ravikanth, Ambika
	Theru Vilakku	M. A. Kaja	Sri Devadevi Films	Gangai Amaran	Vijayan, Deepa, Suruli Rajan
	Thunive Thozhan	R. Sundaram	Modern Theatres	R. Rajesh	Sivakumar, Sivachandran, Sathyakala, Archana
27 September	Uchakattam	N. S. Raj Bharath	Surya Art Films	Shankar–Ganesh	Sarath Babu, Sunitha
7 March	Ullasa Paravaigal	C. V. Rajendran	S. P. T. Films	Ilaiyaraaja	Kamal Haasan, Rathi, Deepa
29 August	Vandichakkaram	K. Vijayan	Vivekanandha Pictures	Shankar–Ganesh	Sivakumar, Saritha, Silk Smitha
6 November	Varumayin Niram Sivappu	K. Balachander	Premalaya Productions	M. S. Viswanathan	Kamal Haasan, Sridevi, Pratap K. Pothen, S. Ve. Shekher
6 November	Vishwaroopam	A. C. Tirulokchandar	Padmalaya Pictures	M. S. Viswanathan	Sivaji Ganesan, Sujatha, Sridevi
5 December	Doorathu Idi Muzhakkam	K. Vijayan	Saisudha Films	Salil Chowdhury	Vijayakanth, Poornima, Peeli Sivam, Suruli Rajan
	Yaaga Saalai	K. V. Manisekaran	Friends Movies	Vijaya Ramani	Thirumurugan, Vadivukkarasi, M. S. Vasanthi
	Vasantha Azhaippugal	T. Rajendar	Jeppiar Pictures	T. Rajendar	Raveendran, Usha Rajendar, Roopa
	Veli Thandiya Velladu	M. A. Kaja	Senthil Creations	Shankar–Ganesh	Vijayan, Vijay Babu, Deepa
	Valli Mayil	M. A. Kaja	Kadayanalur Creations	Shankar–Ganesh	Vijayan, Deepa
