= Kaama =

- Directed by: Ashok Kumar
- Written by: Ashok Kumar; Randor Guy
- Produced by: K. Jagadeeshwara Reddy; N. Sridhar
- Starring: Vishal; Sunila; Urvashi
- Cinematography: Ashok Kumar
- Edited by: Uma Shankar Babu
- Music by: Adithyan
- Production company: Teja Films
- Release date: 17 September 1999
- Country: India
- Language: Tamil

Kaama (transl. Lust) is a 1999 Indian Tamil-language erotic drama film co-written and directed by Ashok Kumar. The film stars newcomers Vishal, Sunila and Urvashi, while Deepti Bhatnagar, Asha Mehra and Alphonsa make guest appearances. The film was dubbed as Kama in Telugu and Kaama Tantra (transl. Composition of Lust, see also tantra) in Hindi. The music for the film was composed by Adithyan and the film opened across India in September 1999.

== Cast ==
- Vishal as Vijay
- Sunila
- Urvashi
- Deepti Bhatnagar
- Asha Mehra
- Alphonsa
- Satya Prakash
- Bala Singh as Venkatagiri
- Suriyan as Panneerselvam
- Parivallal as Devaraj
- Kaushal as Navananda Swamy
- S. V. Ramadoss as a judge
- K. R. Vatsala as a rich lady
- Idichapuli Selvaraj as a constable

== Production ==
After making films with sexual content including Kamagni (1987) and Andru Peytha Mazhaiyil (1989), Ashok Kumar chose to make a further film on the same theme as he felt that one "cannot sell the film unless it has got some sensuality". Titled Kaama, the film's director cast his son, Vishal, in the leading role with actresses Sunila and Urvashi also selected. Debutant Asha Mehra also signed to star in the film, while the script was co-written by writer Randor Guy. Production began in August 1998 and the shoot of the film was completed in six months with plans to release the film in Telugu and Hindi also. Production began with a week-long schedule in Chennai depicting the lead actress's house, then a song featuring the lead three actors and forty dancers was shot at Mahabalipuram. Deepti Bhatnagar also shot for an item number, featuring in a song involving the use of props such as honey, milk, rosewater and mud of sandalwood. A further song with Shweta Menon at Hogenakkal Falls was planned but later not shot.

Before the release of the film, the project garnered significant media attention due to its sexual content. The theatrical distribution rights was sold out across the country, with particular popularity in Tamil Nadu, where its business was compared to that of the Rajinikanth-starrer Padayappa (1999). The publicity prompted producer Jagadeswara Reddy to add the title Kaama before his name, and be subsequently referred to in the media as "Kaama" Jagadeswara Reddy. The producer also announced another project titled Kaamini featuring Shilpa Shetty in February 1999, but the film was never made.

== Release ==
The film failed to gain clearance from the Central Board of Film Certification in March 1999 due to its erotic content. In an interview to Rediff.com, Ashok Kumar stated his anger at the Board's decision to label it "a perverted, pornographic film" and questioned their aesthetic, creative and cinematic sense. He added that it was unfair that the Board were trying to taint his image as a respected filmmaker with such accusations. The film later had a low-profile, limited release in September 1999.

Ashok Kumar later chose to relaunch his son, Vishal, through a Hindi film with a similar theme titled Khajuraho (2002) featuring him alongside actresses Mamta Kulkarni and Saadhika.
