= Azhagiya Kanne =

- Title card
- Directed by: Mahendran
- Screenplay by: Mahendran
- Produced by: Adiyar
- Starring: Sarath Babu; Baby Anju; Sumalatha; Suhasini
- Cinematography: Ashok Kumar
- Edited by: B. Lenin
- Music by: Ilaiyaraaja
- Production company: Southern Creations
- Release date: 17 December 1982
- Running time: 127 minutes
- Country: India
- Language: Tamil

Azhagiya Kanne (transl. Beautiful dear) is a 1982 Indian Tamil-language film written and directed by Mahendran. The film stars Sarath Babu, Baby Anju, Sumalatha and Suhasini. It was released on 17 December 1982.

== Plot ==
Bhama is a renowned dancer born into a devadasi family. She's constantly fending off unwanted sexual advances from prominent men in her village and is generally vexed at the state of her life. With the exception of her aunt Pechiamma, her entire family pushes her into sex work. Prasanna is a sculptor that greatly admires Bhama's dance and is kind to her. Bhama finds herself drawn to his kindness and proposes that they marry. He initially refuses but changes his mind when he realises her family will eventually force her into sex work. Worried about losing her and the money she could bring in, they take her to a corrupt samiyar to convince her to agree to sex work. He attempts to rape then kills her but tells her family she's agreed to sex work and left the country with a rich man. Prasanna is also told this and is heart-broken. He swears off sculpting and leaves town. Pechiamma is also devastated as she always thought of Bhama as her own child. Years later, Pechiamma's child Kasthoori – a miracle, late in life baby born after Bhama's death – has an uncanny knowledge of Bhama. She's wiser than her years and bears a strong hatred of the samiyar. The samiyar – convinced Bhama's spirit is in Kasthoori – leaves town. Kasthoori also runs away from home and befriends Prasanna. He's bewildered by this strange child that won't leave him alone and insists on helping him. Since losing Bhama, he's been wandering with little aim or direction in life. Kasthoori arranges for a place for them to stay and gets him a job. Prasanna adopts Kasthoori and gains a sense of responsibility and direction in his life. Lakshmi was engaged to marry Prasanna before he met Bhama and has been waiting for him. Kasthoori brings her to Prasanna and she joins their odd family. Kasthoori seems to know what will happen before it happens and creates a sense of unease in those around her. She's become prominent enough to garner interest from the press. Lakshmi is also increasingly at unease with Kasthoori. She convinces Prasanna to go to the samiyar – newly arrived in town- for guidance. Pechiamma and her husband also arrive in town searching for their daughter. Kasthoori finally finds herself in a position to exact revenge but must face multiple obstacles.

== Cast ==
- Sarath Babu as Prasanna
- Baby Anju as Kasthoori
- Sumalatha as Bhama
- Suhasini as Lakshmi
- Thengai Srinivasan
- Vennira Aadai Moorthy
- Charuhasan as Samiyar
- Senthamarai as the landlord
- Bayilvan Ranganathan
- Kullamani
- Kumarimuthu
- Gandhimathi as Pechiamma

== Soundtrack ==
The soundtrack was composed by Ilaiyaraaja, and the lyrics were written by Vaali and Gangai Amaran.

Track listing
No.	Title	Lyrics	Singer(s)	Length
1.	"Mookambikai"	Vaali	S. P. Sailaja	4:20
2.	"Nanirukkum Antha"	Gangai Amaran	S. Janaki	4:30
3.	"Ye Mama Kovama"	Gangai Amaran	B. S. Sasirekha	4:23
4.	"Chinna Chinna Kangal"	Vaali	K. J. Yesudas	4:27
Total length:				17:40

== Critical reception ==
Thiraignani of Kalki praised Mahendran for softening the revenge story as much on the screen instead of speeding up while also appreciating the acting of star cast, Ashok Kumar's cinematography and concluded saying despite being a ghost story it does not make the viewer yawn. Balumani of Anna praised the acting of cast, cinematography, music and direction and praised the film's message.
