= Nandu (film) =

1981 film by Mahendran

- Title card
- Directed by: Mahendran
- Screenplay by: Mahendran
- Based on: Nandu by Sivasankari
- Produced by: S. Dakshinamoorthy
- Starring: Ashwini; Suresh
- Cinematography: Ashok Kumar
- Edited by: A. Paul Duraisingh
- Music by: Ilaiyaraaja
- Production company: Rangaraj Creations
- Release date: 17 April 1981
- Running time: 110 minutes
- Country: India
- Language: Tamil

Nandu (transl. Crab) is a 1981 Indian film written and directed by Mahendran. The film stars Ashwini and newcomer Suresh. It is based on the 1975 novel of the same name by Sivasankari. The film, primarily in Tamil, contains significant dialogue in Hindi due to the story being set in Lucknow, Uttar Pradesh. It was released on 17 April 1981, and failed commercially.

== Plot ==
Ramkumar Sharma is a sickly engineer living in Lucknow, Uttar Pradesh in a large family. He has asthma and does not like the behaviour of his autocratic father, but is deeply attached to his loving mother. Unable to get along with his father who compels him to marry a girl of his choice, Sharma leaves for Madras, Tamil Nadu. He finds a job there and meets Seetha. Once settled, he goes around looking for a house with the help of house broker. Incidentally, he finds Seetha residing as a tenant in a portion in the very same house. He likes the portion and agrees to start living there. The lives of the girls who live in portions of the large house are brightened by the appearance of the engineer from Lucknow. Two of them try to impress Sharma. One of them is the house owner's daughter, while the other is Seetha. Eventually, he ends up marrying Seetha.

== Cast ==
- Ashwini as Seetha
- Suresh as Ramkumar Sharma
- Samikannu as Arunachalam
- Vennira Aadai Moorthy as Singamuthu
- Beena Halsi as Ramkumar Sharma's mother
- Vanitha Krishnachandran as Uma
- Kutty Padmini as Lakshmi
- S. N. Parvathy as Uma's mother
- Kumarimuthu as the house broker
- Rajendra Prasad as the rickshaw driver

== Production ==
Nandu is based on the 1975 novel of the same name by Sivasankari. Suhasini, who previously appeared in Mahendran's Nenjathai Killathe (1980), worked as an assistant cinematographer under Ashok Kumar. The film took liberties with the novel; while the protagonist in the novel is a cancer patient, the disease was changed to asthma for the film. Debutant Suresh was chosen as the lead actor, portraying a Hindi-speaking man from Lucknow when Mahendran saw him at his friend's home while Ashwini who earlier acted in Mahendran's Uthiripookkal (1979) was the lead actress. Sarath Babu dubbed Suresh's voice. Mahendran spotted an actress named Beena Halsi at Lucknow and chose her to portray Suresh's mother. Since the male protagonist and his family are shown to be hailing from Lucknow as depicted in the novel, Mahendran wanted to shoot in Lucknow but felt the budget would escalate; however producer Dakshinamoorthy agreed to this, thus Mahendran shot two songs with Hindi lyrics there. While filming the song "Kaise Kahoon", Suresh struggled to emote which led Mahendran to film the whole song focusing only on Ashwini.

== Themes ==
Writing for Frontline, Venkatesh Chakravarthy believes the title Nandu is a metaphor used as a "double-edged weapon in the film".

== Soundtrack ==
The soundtrack was composed by Ilaiyaraaja. The songs "Kaise Kahoon" and "Hum Hai Akele" are entirely in Hindi. The song "Manjal Veyil" is set in the Carnatic raga Kalyani.

Track listing
No.	Title	Lyrics	Singer(s)	Length
1.	"Kaise Kahoon"	P. B. Sreenivas	Bhupinder Singh, S. Janaki	4:31
2.	"Hum Hai Akele"	P. B. Sreenivas	S. Janaki	4:54
3.	"Alli Thantha Bhoomi"	Madhukur Kannan	Malaysia Vasudevan	4:31
4.	"Manjal Veyil"	Gangai Amaran	Uma Ramanan	4:05
5.	"Paduthamma Kaatrin Alaigal" (Title song)		Bhupinder Singh	3:06
Total length:				21:07

== Release and reception ==
Nandu was released on 17 April 1981. The posters were designed with a crab's shadow looming over the protagonist to indicate his eventual death. When the film was released in theatres, audience mocked the film, saying Mahendran made a complete Hindi film which led the producer to dub the Hindi dialogues into Tamil and re-released it much to the dissatisfaction of Mahendran. Despite this, the film failed at box-office. Kumudam noted the film's abundance of Hindi dialogues, and caustically commented that any more dialogues in Hindi would result in K. Balaji (a film producer known mainly for remaking Hindi films in Tamil) remaking the film in Tamil. Jeeva of Kalki appreciated the comedy by Mahendran's usual team of Kumarimuthu, Vennira Aadai Moorthy and Samikannu, the cinematography by Ashok Kumar, Ilaiyaraaja's music, and concluded that the film was a must watch for Mahendran's filmmaking prowess. Maalai Malar attributed the film's failure to the audience's inability to understand the many Hindi dialogues.

== Bibliography ==
- Mahendran (2013) [2004]. சினிமாவும் நானும் [Cinema and I] (in Tamil). Karpagam Publications. OCLC 54777094.
