= Neerajanam =

- Official poster
- Directed by: Ashok Kumar
- Written by: Acharya Aatreya (dialogues)
- Screenplay by: Ashok Kumar
- Story by: R.V. Ramana Murthy; Yaddanapudi Sulochana Rani
- Produced by: R.V. Ramana Murthy
- Starring: Vishwas; Saranya; J. V. Somayajulu
- Cinematography: Ashok Kumar
- Edited by: Umashankar Babu
- Music by: O. P. Nayyar
- Production company: Lalitha Sri Combines
- Release date: 21 July 1989
- Running time: 2:03:11
- Country: India
- Language: Telugu

Neerajanam is a 1989 Indian Telugu-language romantic drama film directed by Ashok Kumar and starring Vishwas and Saranya. The film's music is composed by O. P. Nayyar.

== Plot ==
Vijay and Jaya fall in love and get married. Tragically, Jaya dies in an accident. Unable to cope with the loss, Vijay becomes an alcoholic. Nirosha, Jaya's sister, tries to help him quit drinking, but eventually Vijay also dies in the same place where Jaya lost her life.

== Cast ==
- Vishwas as Vijay
- Saranya as Jaya/Jyothi (Dual Role)
- Rajyalakshmi as Nirosha
- Kuyili (special appearance in the song "Prema Velasindi")
- Sarath Babu
- J. V. Somayajulu
- Harish
- Siva Satyanarayana

== Production ==
Saranya Ponvannan made her Telugu debut with this film.

== Soundtrack ==
After a gap of ten years, O. P. Nayyar returned to composing with this film. All the songs from this film were retained in the Hindi remake Mangni (1992).

Tracklist
No.	Title	Singer(s)	Length
1.	"Ghallu Ghalluna"	S. Janaki	4:39
2.	"Manasoka Madhukalasham"	S. P. Balasubrahmanyam	4:09
3.	"Prema Velisindi"	S. P. Balasubrahmanyam, S. Janaki	4:21
4.	"Oohala Uyalalo"	S. P. Balasubrahmanyam, S. Janaki	4:29
5.	"Ee Visala Prsantha"	M. S. Ramarao	4:06
6.	"Ninnu Choodaka"	S. P. Balasubrahmanyam, S. Janaki	5:50
7.	"Nivadhanam"	S. P. Balasubrahmanyam,	5:22
8.	"Mamathey Madhuram"	S. P. Balasubrahmanyam	4:56
9.	"Nene Sakshyamu"	S. Janaki	5:07
10.	"Naa Premaki"	S. P. Balasubrahmanyam	4:33

== Reception ==
Griddaluru Gopalrao of Zamin Ryot on his review dated 4 August 1989 criticized the film for its poor writing and lackluster direction. Gopalrao, however, praised Saranya's performance.

== Awards ==
Nandi Awards

- Best Music Director - O. P. Nayyar
- Best Supporting Actor - Sarath Babu
- Best Male Playback Singer - S. P. Balasubrahmanyam
