= Sudhakaran =

Sudhakaran may refer to:

- G. Sudhakaran, minister in Government of Kerala, India
- K. Sudhakaran a Member of Parliament (India)
- Pandalam Sudhakaran, Indian politician
- Sudhakaran Ramanthali, Indian Malayalam-language writer

== See also ==
- Sudhakar, an Indian name, alternative form of the above
