= Johnny (1980 film) =

1980 film by Mahendran

- Theatrical release poster
- Directed by: Mahendran
- Written by: Mahendran
- Produced by: K. R. Gangadharan
- Starring: Rajinikanth; Sridevi; Deepa
- Cinematography: Ashok Kumar
- Edited by: A. Paul Duraisingham
- Music by: Ilaiyaraaja
- Production company: K. R. G Productions
- Release date: 15 August 1980
- Running time: 139 minutes
- Country: India
- Language: Tamil

Johnny is a 1980 Indian Tamil-language action thriller film written and directed by Mahendran. The film stars Rajinikanth, Sridevi and Deepa. Featuring Rajinikanth in a dual role, it revolves around the eponymous con artist who is implicated for a crime committed by Vidyasagar, a lookalike.

Johnny is the first original script directed by Mahendran. It was released on 15 August 1980. Though the film disappointed audiences in the first two weeks of its run because its title gave the impression of an action entertainer, it picked up in the third week and became a commercial success, running for over 100 days in theatres.

== Plot ==
Johnny, a con artist, indulges in cons with his friend to settle his father's debts. Johnny was born out of wedlock; his mother never got the recognition and dignity of a wife. Though Johnny is upset on never getting recognised legally as a son, he decides to help his father by clearing his loans. Johnny, a fan of singer Archana, never misses her concerts, which is also noticed by Archana. A romance develops between the two, but neither expresses it.

Vidyasagar, a barber, lives in a bungalow away from the city. Once when he returns home after getting drunk and losing control, he is helped by Bhama, a homeless orphan. When Bhama requests him to employ her for domestic work, he relents. Bhama, slightly greedy and indecisive, always aspires for better things in life. However, her beauty and innocence makes Vidyasagar fall in love with her. He protects and cares for her and buys her new clothes.

Johnny cons a businessman, who files a police complaint. When he sees Vidyasagar at a salon, he mistakes him for Johnny and calls the police. The commissioner investigates the case along with the superintendent. Since Vidyasagar was in the salon when the con took place, the commissioner believes the thief is someone else. The police start hunting for Johnny and also monitor Vidyasagar. Johnny's friend visits the salon and mistakes Vidyasagar for Johnny. Upon realising Vidyasagar is another man, he brings Johnny to meet him.

Learning of the troubles Vidyasagar is facing because of his crimes, Johnny visits Vidyasagar and reveals himself as the culprit. To protect Vidyasagar from the police, Johnny tells him to remain home for 10 days so that he can resolve all issues and come clean. Archana expresses her love for Johnny, but he hesitates to reciprocate due to his background. When Archana misunderstands his hesitation, thinking he is doubting her integrity and character, Johnny confesses his love and seeks time to settle a few things before marrying her. Johnny eventually settles all his father's loans, only to witness his father die.

Vidyasagar notices Bhama with another man. When questioned, she says she shares a sibling-like relationship with him. Vidyasagar proposes to her and assures he will take good care of her. However, Bhama looks down at his profession and feels it would be embarrassing for her children. Though hurt, Vidyasagar tries to explain things to her and gives her time to decide. However, Bhama hurriedly tries to escape with the man at night. Vidyasagar stops and kills them. Witnesses inform the police, who assume it is Johnny's work and search for him, also for pending cases against him. Vidyasagar, aware that Johnny is wanted, tries to foist the murder charge on him, and Johnny goes into hiding.

When Vidyasagar learns from Johnny's friend about Archana's love and her affluence, he decides to impersonate Johnny and goes to Archana's house. When Archana explains that she compensated Johnny's victims at the cost of her wealth, Vidyasagar is disappointed. Archana, hurt by "Johnny's" curtness, is confused about his change in taste and behaviour. Though Vidyasagar had come with plans to win her and grab her wealth, her character and love for Johnny stop him, and he reveals his true identity. He assures her that Johnny will be back soon and advises her to perform one last concert (which she had cancelled after Johnny got into trouble) so that Johnny will return.

Johnny sees an advertisement for Archana's concert and decides to attend. On the scheduled day, heavy rain occurs and no one attends. However, Archana still comes to the venue and sings. The police suspect her decision and wait at the venue. Johnny arrives at the venue, accepts responsibility for all the frauds and murders, and is arrested by the police. But Archana realises that it is actually Vidyasagar posing as Johnny. Archana gets upset when the real Johnny does not arrive. Just before she leaves the venue, Johnny reaches, meets her and understands all that transpired. They reunite.

== Cast ==
- Rajinikanth as Johnny and Vidyasagar
- Sridevi as Archana
- Deepa as Bhama
- Balaji as a police officer
- Suruli Rajan as Johnny's friend
- Samikannu as Naidu
- Prabhakar Reddy as Johnny's father
- Kumarimuthu as Saloon shop assistant
- Gopalakrishnan as a police officer
- Subhashini as a tribal woman
- Kanchana as Johnny's mother

== Production ==
Mahendran had a strong desire to make a film with Rajinikanth; hence he made this film simultaneously with Nenjathai Killathe. As the producer could not provide the equipment and facilities for the climax scene with a song, Mahendran was forced to use stock shots and manage to shoot with the limited facilities offered, but managed to mix the close-up shots with stock shot, and the scene came properly. This was the first time for which popular artist Jayaraj designed the costumes. He first drew the illustrations of scenes with costumes and then got them stitched, bringing in newness and style in Rajinikanth's look, which attracted the masses. It is Mahendran's first directorial based on an original concept.

The scene where Archana (Sridevi) proposes to Johnny was shot in Ooty in a bungalow at midnight. When the scene was shot, the whole unit was silent, they saw only the characters of the film, not Rajinikanth and Sridevi. After the scene was shot, Rajinikanth appreciated Sridevi's acting and mentioned to Mahendran that though he tried, she overshadowed him in the scene. Because Rajinikanth played two roles, he was billed twice in the opening credits, as "Rajinikanth and Rajinikanth". To play Vidyasagar, Rajinikanth sported a centre-parted hairstyle and wore box-framed glasses.

== Themes ==
Kavitha Muralidharan of The Hindu wrote that most of Mahendran's films, including Johnny, "offer a prismatic view of relationships". She contrasted Johnny with Mahendran's earlier film Uthiripookkal (1979), saying that while that film's protagonist was "rigid in his relationship with people", the title character of Johnny is "as vulnerable as a woman could be". Mani Prabhu of Cinema Express described Johnny as an antithesis to the "lead man of those times – the macho guy, surrounded by drooling girls, bashing up villains and spouting pretentious advice" by being "vulnerable, loving and grounded".

== Soundtrack ==
The soundtrack was composed by Ilaiyaraaja. The song "Oru Iniya Manathu" is erroneously credited to Jency on the original LP record marketed by Inreco; it was actually sung by Sujatha. The song "Aasaiye Kaathule" is set in the Carnatic raga known as Sindhu Bhairavi, and "Kaatril Enthan" is set in Keeravani. "Aasaiye Kaathule" was reused as "Raathri" in the Telugu film Gundello Godari (2013). It was also reused twice in Hindi: as "Dil Mere Udaas" (composed by Anand–Milind) for Angrakshak (1995), and as "Sannata" (composed by Ilaiyaraaja) in Shamitabh (2015). "Kaatril Endhan Geetham" was reused in Hindi as "Naina Bole" in Aur Ek Prem Kahani (1996), and the instrumental theme was sampled by Yuvan Shankar Raja for the theme of 7/G Rainbow Colony (2004). The film was dubbed into Telugu as Naa Pere Johnny and lyrics were written by Rajashri.

Track listing
No.	Title	Lyrics	Singer(s)	Length
1.	"En Vaanilay"	Kannadasan	Jency	4:48
2.	"Kaatril Enthan"	Gangai Amaran	S. Janaki	4:29
3.	"Aasaiye Kaathule"	Gangai Amaran	S. P. Sailaja	4:40
4.	"Senorita, I Love You"	Gangai Amaran	S. P. Balasubrahmanyam	4:21
5.	"Oru Iniya Manathu"	Gangai Amaran	Sujatha	4:21
6.	"Chasing Music" (instrumental)	—	—	4:23
Total length:				27:02

Telugu (dubbed) track listing
No.	Title	Singer(s)	Length
1.	"Ee Velalo Oke Veduka"	P. Susheela
2.	"Chakkadanala Chinnadhira"	S. P. Sailaja
3.	"Okka Kanne Manasu Kalalu"	P. Susheela
4.	"Senorita I Love You"	S. P. Balasubrahmanyam
5.	"Ragile Ee Naa Geetham"	S. Janaki

== Release ==
Johnny was released on 15 August 1980. The title Johnny gave the impression of an action entertainer, hence it disappointed audiences in the first two weeks. However, the emotionally moving story, intense acting by Rajinikanth and Sridevi and songs attracted the audience, so the film picked up in the third week and became a success, running for over 100 days in theatres.

== Critical reception ==
Piousji of the magazine Sunday wrote, "Sridevi not only looked smart, but came out with a convincing performance and [Rajinikanth] too was quite impressive" in Johnny. Ananda Vikatan gave the film a C+ rating, equal to around 35 to 40 marks. Writing for Kalki, Nalini Sastry appreciated the film for eschewing Tamil cinema conventions such as fight scenes, club dances and loose fitting clothes, noting that Mahendran's direction, Ilaiyaraaja's music and Ashok Kumar's cinematography gave them the feeling of watching an American film. Naagai Dharuman of Anna lauded Rajinikanth's dual role performance, Ashok Kumar's cinematography and Ilaiyaraaja's music.

== Bibliography ==
- Dhananjayan, G. (2011). The Best of Tamil Cinema, 1931 to 2010: 1977–2010. Galatta Media. OCLC 733724281.
- Mahendran (2013) [2004]. சினிமாவும் நானும் [Cinema and I] (in Tamil). Karpagam Publications. OCLC 54777094.
- Sundararaman (2007) [2005]. Raga Chintamani: A Guide to Carnatic Ragas Through Tamil Film Music (2nd ed.). Pichhamal Chintamani. OCLC 295034757.
