= Charuhasan =

Indian actor (born 1931)

- Born: 5 January 1931 (age 95); Paramakudi, Madras Presidency, British India
- Occupations: Actor, Filmmaker, Writer
- Years active: 1979–present
- Spouse: Komalam (m. 1953)
- Children: 3, including Suhasini
- Relatives: See Haasan family

Charuhasan Srinivasan (born 5 January 1931) is an Indian actor, director and retired lawyer who has acted in Tamil, Telugu, Malayalam and Kannada films. He won the National Film Award for Best Actor and the Karnataka State Film Award for Best Actor for the Kannada film Tabarana Kathe (1987). Charuhasan is the elder brother of veteran actor Kamal Haasan and father of Indian actress Suhasini.

== Early life ==
Charuhasan was born on 5 January 1931 to lawyer and Indian independence activist D. Srinivasan and his wife Rajalakshmi. He was the eldest son of the couple and more than twenty-three years older than his youngest brother Kamal Haasan.

Charuhasan had a different schooling to other children his age; due to an accident he was unable to attend school for the first few years of his life and had a private tutor give him a basic education. He was directly admitted to fifth grade at the age of nine. In 1949, Charuhasan joined the Raja Lakhamgouda Law College in Belgaum and qualified as a lawyer in 1951.

Charuhasan practised law from 1951 to 1981. As lawyer, Charuhasan appeared in many high-profile cases, even representing U. Muthuramalingam Thevar in the Immanuvel Sekaran murder case. During this period, he was influenced by the rationalist philosophy of Periyar E. V. Ramasamy. Periyar even referred to Charuhasan as his sishyan (disciple).

== In the film industry ==
Charuhasan was interested in movies since childhood. During the late 1940s, he used to watch two foreign films a day. When his younger brother, Kamal Hasan, started acting in movies as a child actor, Charuhasan was his caretaker. Charuhasan eventually made his debut in the 1979 Tamil film Uthiripookkal directed by Mahendran which was based on a short story by Pudhumaipithan. Since then, he has acted in more than 120 films, often playing supporting or antagonistic roles, his most important movies being Vedham Pudhithu, Tabarana Kathe and Thalapathi. He has also directed two films, IPC 215 and Puthiya Sangammam.

== Personal life ==
Charuhasan is married to Komalam since 1953. They have three daughters: Nandhini, Subhashini and Suhasini. Suhasini is an actress and married to film director Mani Ratnam.

== Awards ==
- 1986 – National Film Award for Best Actor for Tabarana Kathe
- 1986 – Karnataka State Film Award for Best Actor for Tabarana Kathe
- 1992 – Filmfare Award for Best Kannada Actor for Kubi Matthu Iyala

== Selected filmography ==
Tamil

- Uthiripookkal (1979)
- Nenjathai Killathe (1980)
- Nizhalgal (1980)
- Raja Paarvai (1981)
- Moondru Mugam (1982)
- Rani Theni (1982)
- Agni Sakshi (1982)
- Oorukku Upadesam (1984)
- Vikram (1986)
- Raja Mariyadhai (1987)
- Meendum Oru Kaathal Kathai (1985)
- Vedham Pudhithu (1987)
- Paasa Paravaigal (1988)
- Andru Peytha Mazhaiyil (1989)
- Pudhiya Kaatru (1990)
- Thalapathi (1991)
- Anbu Sangili (1991)
- Nattukku Oru Nallavan (1991)
- Puthiya Thendral (1993)
- Veera (1994)
- Thendral Varum Theru (1994)
- Jai Hind (1994)
- Rajavin Parvaiyile (1995)
- Kaadhale Nimmadhi (1998)
- Velai (1998)
- Dhill (2001)
- Thamizhan (2002)
- Pon Megalai (2005)
- Karka Kasadara (2005)
- Yuga (2006)
- Uthamaputhiran (2010)
- Sillunu Oru Sandhippu (2013)
- Saithan (2016)
- Odu Raja Odu (2018)
- Dha Dha 87 (2019)
- Haraa (2024)

Telugu

- Subhodhayam (1980)
- Amavasya Chandrudu (1981)
- Jamadagni (1988)
- Inspector Rudra (1990)
- Ankitham (1990)
- Neti Siddhartha (1990)
- Surya IPS (1991)
- Shanti Kranti (1991)
- Nirnayam (1991)
- Nani (1992)
- Ankuram (1993)
- Matru Devo Bhava (1993)
- Mounam (1995)
- Sivanna (2000)
- Naa Peru Surya (2018)
- Venky Mama (2019)
- Dear Comrade (2019)
- Gamanam (2020)
- Popcorn (2023)

Malayalam

- Karimpoocha (1981)
- Vazhiyorakazchakal (1987)
- Unni Vanna Divasam (1984)
- Adharvam (1989)
- Vachanam (1990)
- Randam Varavu (1990)
- Aayushkalam (1992)
- Gandhari (1993)
- Kanchanam (1996)
- Guru (1997)
- War and Love (2003)
- Hai (2005)
- Raghuvinte Swantham Raziya (2011)

Kannada

- Tabarana Kathe (1987)
- Suprabhatha (1988; as presenter)
- Kubi Matthu Iyala (1992)
- Durga Shakti (1999)
- Neelambari (2001)

Director

- Pudhiya Sangamam (1982)
- IPC 215 (2003)

== Books ==
- His book, Thinking on my Feet : Charuhasan Autobiography published by LiFi Publications, New Delhi under the imprint Biog has been released during the New Delhi World Book Fair, 2015.
