= Metti (film) =

1982 film by Mahendran

- Theatrical release poster
- Directed by: Mahendran
- Written by: Mahendran
- Based on: Metti by Mahendran
- Produced by: Ganeshan
- Starring: Sarath Babu; C. R. Vijayakumari; Radhika; Vadivukkarasi; Rajesh
- Cinematography: Ashok Kumar
- Edited by: B. Lenin
- Music by: Ilaiyaraaja
- Production company: Rose Arts
- Release date: 14 January 1982
- Running time: 121 minutes
- Country: India
- Language: Tamil

Metti (/mɛttiː/ transl. Toe Ring) is a 1982 Indian Tamil-language film written and directed by Mahendran. The film stars Sarath Babu, C. R. Vijayakumari, Radhika, Vadivukkarasi and Rajesh. It is based on Mahendran's novel of the same name that was serialised in the magazine Chaavi. The film was released on 14 January 1982.

== Plot ==
Pattabhi arrives on the scene looking to rent a house. He befriends a tea seller and an all purpose broker, who takes him to Kalyani amma's house. When he meets her, Pattabhi reveals that he is the son of Kalyani's estranged husband and that he has come to expiate for his father's sins. Kalyani allows him to rent a room in her house and Pattabhi meets his two sisters Sulekha and Preetha, who is dressed as a Gujarathi woman. The house does not belong to Kalyani amma but is instead owned by a Gujarathi man who is usually away. Then the mother reveals in a private conversation to Pattabhi that she is in fact accused of infidelity by the neighbours, who advise Preetha to dress like a Gujarathi. Pattabhi tries to get close to his sister. Vijayan a writer is the other tenant in the house, and he is in love with Preetha. Sulekha works at a factory and here a co worker professes his love for her. In the course of the film the two daughters come to know of the bad reputation foisted on to the mother and they demand that they all vacate the house which is owned by the Gujarathi. The mother replies that one can never escape from shame and curiously commits suicide. Sulekha decides against the wishes of Pattabhi to marry the co worker who appears dubious. After her marriage she moves to Bombay, and a tearful Preetha meets pattabhi with a letter from Sulekha where she recounts the horror of her marriage. Pattabhi rushes to Bombay and rescues her. On her return, Vijayan has a change of heart and chooses to remarry Sulekha instead. Pattabhi is keen to hear the sound of Metti in the house again which he feels died with Kalyani. He rushes out to buy the metti, but Sulekha can no longer wear it as she is bedridden. The estranged drunken father enters the scene and is the cause for some more trouble in the film. Preetha asks Patthabhi to find her a husband. During the wedding Pattabhi realises that he had forgotten to buy the Metti and he rushes out to buy it. On his way back, he is distracted by his father which proves fatal. The film closes with Preetha wearing the Metti and calling out to her brother repeatedly.

== Cast ==
- Sarath Babu as Pattabhi
- C. R. Vijayakumari as Kalyani
- Radhika as Preetha
- Vadivukkarasi as Sulekha
- Rajesh as Vijayan
- Senthamarai as Shanmugam
- Vennira Aadai Moorthy as Thangam
- Tambaram Lalitha as Kalyani's neighbour
- Kumarimuthu as the tea master
- Master Raja

== Soundtrack ==
The music was composed by Ilaiyaraaja. The track "Metti Oli Kaatrodu" is set in the raga Jog.

Track listing
No.	Title	Lyrics	Singer(s)	Length
1.	"Metti Oli Kaatrodu"	Gangai Amaran	Ilaiyaraaja, S. Janaki	4:44
2.	"Metti Metti"	Mathukkoor Kannan	Brahmanandam, Sasirekha, chorus	3:37
3.	"Santhakavigal"	Gangai Amaran	Brahmanandam	4:16
4.	"Kalyanam Ennai"	Gangai Amaran	Jency, Rajesh, Radhika, chorus	4:51
Total length:				17:28

== Reception ==
Sindhu Jeeva of Kalki praised the acting of the cast, Ilaiyaraaja's music, Ashok Kumar's cinematography and Mahendran's direction.

== Legacy ==
On the centenary of Indian cinema in April 2013, News18 (then known as IBN Live) included Metti in its list, "The 100 greatest Indian films of all time".
