= Eera Vizhi Kaaviyangal =

- Directed by: B. R. Ravi Shankar
- Produced by: Mrs. Vijayalakshmi
- Starring: Sarath Babu; Pratap Pothen; Radhika
- Cinematography: Ashok Kumar
- Music by: Ilaiyaraaja
- Production company: R.V. Cinema
- Release date: 4 June 1982
- Country: India
- Language: Tamil

Eera Vizhi Kaaviyangal (transl. Teary-eyed epics) is a 1982 Indian Tamil-language film directed by B. R. Ravi Shankar, starring Sarath Babu, Pratap Pothen and Radhika. It was released on 4 June 1982.

== Story ==
Prathap is an poor, aspiring musician. He leaves his village and an abusive father and goes to Chennai hoping to make it big in the music industry. A sympathetic lodge owner gives him a job and lets him live there. Prathap's repeated attempts to get a break keep failing.

Radha is his neighbor living with his widowed father. She is in love with Gopal who is away on a military assignment. Gopal tries to talk Radha into marrying someone else - because of his risky life in the military - but Radha is adamant she wants to marry just him. But Prathap slowly falls in love with Radha.

Radha finally gets a chance for Prathap to showcase his music skills. Prathap reveals his love for her. Just when Radha is about to leave for Prathap's music concert, she gets the news that Gopal has died. Radha informs this to Prathap, rejects his proposal and kills herself, leaving Prathap grieving all alone.

== Cast ==
- Pratap Pothen as Prathap
- Kumarimuthu
- Vennira Aadai Moorthy
- Radhika as Radha
- Sarath Babu as Gopal

== Soundtrack ==
The music was composed by Ilaiyaraaja. The song "Thendralidai Thoranangal" attained popularity.

Song	Singers	Lyrics
"Kaathal Panpaadu"	K. J. Yesudas	Vairamuthu
"En Gaanam"	Ilaiyaraaja, Jency Anthony	Vairamuthu
"Kanavil Midhakkum"	K. J. Yesudas	Gangai Amaran
"Pazhaya Sogangal"	Ilaiyaraaja	Vairamuthu
"Thendralidai Thoranangal"	Ilaiyaraaja	M. G. Vallabhan
"Kaanum Sandhosham"	Ilaiyaraaja	Ilaiyaraaja
