= Sarath Babu =

Indian actor (1951–2023)

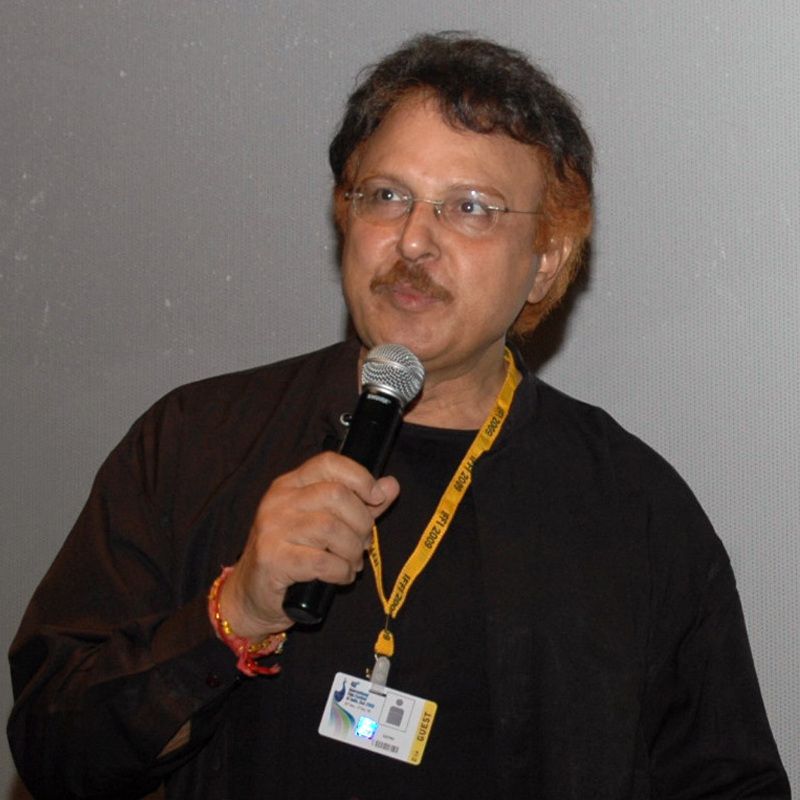
- Babu in 2009
- Born: Sathyam Babu Dixithulu; 31 July 1951; Amadalavalasa, Srikakulam district, Madras State, India
- Died: 22 May 2023 (aged 71); Hyderabad, Telangana, India
- Occupation: Actor
- Years active: 1973–2023
- Spouses: Rama Prabha (m. 1974; div. 1988) Sneha Nambiar (m. 1990; div. 2016)

Sathyam Babu Dixithulu (31 July 1951 – 22 May 2023), known by his stage name Sarath Babu, was an Indian actor who worked predominantly in Tamil and Telugu cinema. He appeared in more than 300 films, including in Tamil, Telugu, Kannada, and a few Malayalam and Hindi films. He has received eight state Nandi Awards.

Babu was noted for his height, handsome looks, and charming smile throughout his acting career, which spanned for around five decades. He was especially known for his camaraderie with Rajinikanth in the films where the duo acted together. He had also shared screen space with Kamal Haasan in many films.

== Personal life ==
Sarath Babu was born as Sathyam Babu Dixithulu on 31 July 1951. He was in a live-in relationship with Telugu actress Rama Prabha during the 1980s. The duo separated in 1988, and Rama alleged that Babu had cheated her and snatched all of her properties in Chennai. Babu denied the allegations but admitted to being in a relationship with Rama. However, he asserted that he had no intention of unlawfully claiming others' properties. Babu stated that he was much younger to Rama when he entered into a relationship with her. He was later married to Sneha Nambiar, daughter of M.N. Nambiar.

== Career ==
Although Babu's father, a hotelier, wanted him to manage the family business, Babu aspired to become a police officer. However, he developed shortsightedness during his college years, which prevented him from joining the police force. Many people close to Babu felt he could enter the film industry as an actor, and though his father objected, his mother was supportive.

Babu entered the film industry in 1973 through the Telugu film Rama Rajyam. He made his Tamil film debut with Pattina Pravesam (1977), directed by K. Balachander. He later became popular through the Tamil film Nizhal Nijamagiradhu (1978), which was also directed by Balachander. Balachander would eventually become Babu's guru in film career.

Babu's maiden collaboration with Rajinikanth, Mullum Malarum (1978), which was the directorial debut for Mahendran, became an evergreen cult classic hit in Tamil cinema, and the film also marked an important milestone in Tamil cinema. His supporting role alongside Rajinikanth received critical acclaim, and his performance in the film's song Senthazham Poovil became the talk of the town across Tamil Nadu. He later developed a deep rooted friendship with Rajinikanth following the success of Mullum Malarum.

Babu's other collaborations with Rajinikanth, such as Annamalai (1992) and Muthu (1995), also stamped his authority as a go-to supporting actor and was also praised for his onscreen chemistry with Rajinikanth, which was fueled by his characterization in those films. Babu played the role of a friend for Rajinikanth before becoming his foe in Annamalai and for Babu's performance in Annamalai as a villain, it stirred memes in social media even several years after the release of the film. He also tasted success in Kannada cinema with Amruthavarshini (1997).

Babu's last film acting role came in Vasantha Mullai, which released in 2023. Films such as Malli Pelli and Por Thozhil were posthumous releases of him.

== Illness and death ==
In April 2023, it was reported that Babu was suffering from sepsis. He died of multiple organ failure on 22 May 2023, after being placed on a ventilator at a private hospital in Hyderabad, Telangana. He was 71. Sarath Babu's final rites were performed in Chennai.

== Partial filmography ==
List of Sarath Babu film credits
Year	Title	Role	Language
1973	Stree		Telugu
1973	Rama Rajyam		Telugu
1976	Raaja	Advocate Ramu	Telugu
1977	Pattina Pravesam		Tamil
1977	Panthulamma		Telugu
1978	Nizhal Nijamagiradhu	Venkatachalam	Tamil
1978	Indradhanussu	Nagesh	Telugu
1978	Vattathukkul Chaduram		Tamil
1978	Sahasavanthudu	Gopi	Telugu
1978	Maro Charitra		Telugu
1978	Mullum Malarum	Kumaran	Tamil
1978	Mudi Sooda Mannan	Bhairavan	Tamil
1978	Ithu Eppadi Irukku		Tamil
1978	Nenjil Aadum Poo Ondru		Tamil
1979	Guppedu Manasu	Buchi Babu	Telugu
1979	Agal Vilakku	Doctor	Tamil
1979	Mambazhathu Vandu		Tamil
1979	Nadagame Ullagam		Tamil
1979	Nool Veli	Buchi Babu	Tamil
1979	Srungara Ramudu	Jaipal	Telugu
1979	Idi Katha Kaadu	Bharani	Telugu
1979	Ninaithale Inikkum	Guest appearance	Tamil
1979	Andamaina Anubhavam		Telugu
1979	Tayaramma Bangarayya	Gopala Krishna	Telugu
1979	Urvasi Neeve Naa Preyasi	Venu	Telugu
1979	Padhai Marinaal		Tamil
1979	Suprabatham		Tamil
1979	Uthiripookkal	Prakash	Tamil
1979	Chakkalathi	Guest Appearance	Tamil
1979	Thisai Maariya Paravaigal	Rangamani	Tamil
1979	Sarapancharam	Swami	Malayalam
1979	Pancha Bhoothalu		Telugu
1980	Nadhiyai Thedi Vandha Kadal		Tamil
1980	Kannil Theriyum Kathaikal		Tamil
1980	Megathukkum Dhagam Undu		Tamil
1980	Manmatha Ragangal		Tamil
1980	Moodu Mulla Bandham		Telugu
1980	Nenjathai Killathe	Chandrasekhar	Tamil
1980	Ponnagaram	Raja	Tamil
1980	Oru Iravu Oru Paravai		Tamil
1980	Mangala Nayagi		Tamil
1980	Saranam Ayyappa		Tamil
1980	Andharangam Oomaiyanathu		Tamil
1980	Pudhiya Thoranangal		Tamil
1980	Uchakattam	Dr. Kiran	Tamil
1981	Tholi Kodi Koosindi	Venkata Swamy	Telugu
1981	Enga Ooru Kannagi		Tamil
1981	Dhanya		Malayalam
1981	47 Natkal	Dr Shankar	Tamil
1981	47 Rojulu	Dr Shankar	Telugu
1981	Agni Poolu		Telugu
1981	Ammayi Manasu		Telugu
1981	Jeevitha Ratham	Mohan	Telugu
1981	Netrikkann	Yuvaraj	Tamil
1981	Arumbugal		Tamil
1981	Radha Kalyanam	Dr Anand	Telugu
1981	Prema Natakam	Rajasekharam	Telugu
1981	Keezh Vaanam Sivakkum	Srivathsan	Tamil
1981	Bala Nagamma	Vijayavarma	Tamil
1981	Dhanya		Malayalam
1981	Seetakoka Chiluka	David	Telugu
1981	Devi Dharisanam		Tamil
1982	Aval Etriya Deepam		Tamil
1982	Kanavugal Karpanaigal		Tamil
1982	Theerpu		Tamil
1982	Pelleedu Pillalu	Chalapati	Telugu
1982	Yamakinkarudu	Kishore	Telugu
1982	Azhagiya Kanne	Prasanna	Tamil
1982	Eera Vizhi Kaaviyangal	Gopal	Tamil
1982	Bala Nagamma	Vijayavarma	Telugu
1982	Metti	Pattabhi	Tamil
1982	Mettela Savvadi		Telugu
1982	Pannai Purathu Pandavargal		Tamil
1983	Sagara Sangamam	Raghu	Telugu
1983	Imaigal		Tamil
1983	Amarajeevi	Madhu	Telugu
1983	Muddula Mogudu	Madhu	Telugu
1983	Sattam	Ravi	Tamil
1983	Villiyanur Matha		Tamil
1983	Sitaara	Zamindar	Telugu
1983	Puli Debba	Manohar	Telugu
1983	Kaliyuga Daivam		Telugu
1983	Gaaju Bommalu		Telugu
1983	Sandhippu	Vasanth	Tamil
1983	Benkiyalli Aralida Hoovu	Kavitha's boss	Kannada
1983	Makkale Devaru	Ramu	Kannada
1984	Vellai Pura Ondru		Tamil
1984	Kanchana Ganga	Jayasimha	Telugu
1984	Kondaveeti Nagulu	D.S.P. Narayana Rao	Telugu
1984	Anbulla Malare		Tamil
1984	Chiranjeevi		Tamil
1984	Unnai Naan Santhithen	Captain Jagdeesh	Tamil
1984	Azhagu		Tamil
1984	Ninaivugal		Tamil
1984	Naan Paadum Paadal	Barath	Tamil
1984	Ezhuthatha Sattangal	Dr. Basheer	Tamil
1984	Mudivalla Arambam	Dr. Ram	Tamil
1984	Swati	Satyam	Telugu
1984	Agni Gundam		Telugu
1985	Anveshana	James	Telugu
1985	Pagal Nilavu	J. Peter Manohar	Tamil
1985	Siksha	George Prasad	Telugu
1985	Musugu Donga	Kiran	Telugu
1985	Anuraga Bandham		Telugu
1985	Vishakanya	Vijayasimha	
1985	Visha Kanni		Tamil
1985	Thulasidala	Sridhar	Kannada
1985	Ooriki Soggadu	Ravi	Telugu
1986	Usha		Kannada
1986	Jeevana Poratam		Telugu
1986	Swati Mutyam	Chalapati	Telugu
1986	Muddula Manavaraalu		Telugu
1986	Manakanakku	Lakshmi's husband	Tamil
1986	Dharma Devathai	Chandrasekhar	Tamil
1986	Kannukku Mai Ezhuthu		Tamil
1986	Khaidi Rani		Telugu
1986	Ukku Manishi	Salim	Telugu
1986	Kashmora	Sridhar	Telugu
1987	Velaikaran	Rajkumar	Tamil
1987	Shankar Guru	Devi's father	Tamil
1987	Chinnari Devatha	Devi's father	Telugu
1987	Chellakutti	Vijay	Tamil
1987	Ida Prapancham		Telugu
1987	Gautami		Telugu
1987	Chaitanya Ratham	Vijay	Telugu
1987	Viswanatha Nayakudu	Thimmappa	Telugu
1987	Sankeertana	Sravan Babu	Telugu
1987	Gandhinagar Rendava Veedhi	Ravi	Telugu
1987	Dabbevariki Chedu	Govardhanam	Telugu
1987	Samsaram Oka Chadarangam	Prakash	Telugu
1987	Michael Raj		Tamil
1988	Shakthi	ACP Bharath Kumar	Kannada
1988	Kampana		Kannada
1988	Jeevana Jyothi	Sridhar	Telugu
1988	Aatma Katha		Telugu
1988	Dorakani Donga	Tiger Raja	Telugu
1988	Adhu Antha Kaalam		Tamil
1988	Aanimuthyam	Ravi Chandra	Telugu
1988	Abhinandana	Kamala's husband	Telugu
1988	Daisy		Malayalam
1988	Chattamtho Chadarangam	Suryam and Nagabhushanam	Telugu
1988	Neerajanam		Telugu
1988	Prana Snehitulu		Telugu
1988	Kanchana Seeta		Telugu
1988	August 15 Raatri	Ravindra	Telugu
1988	Rendum Rendum Anju	Balu	Tamil
1988	Anna Chellelu	Dr. Rajasekhar	Telugu
1988	Manasukkul Mathappu	Dr. Raja	Tamil
1988	O Bharya Katha	Subhash	Telugu
1989	Chettu Kinda Pleader	Gopala Krishna	Telugu
1989	Raktha Kanneeru	Rajasekharam	Telugu
1989	Swathi Chinukulu		Telugu
1989	Yamapasam		Telugu
1989	Thendral Sudum		Tamil
1989	Thendral Puyalanadhu		Tamil
1989	Paape Maa Pranam	Richards	Telugu
1989	Vijay	Giridhar	Telugu
1989	Andru Peytha Mazhaiyil	Rajesh	Tamil
1990	Kokila	Police Officer	Telugu
1990	Neti Siddhartha	David	Telugu
1990	Aggiramudu	Ram Mohan	Telugu
1990	Raktha Jwala		Telugu
1990	Mrugathrushna		Telugu
1990	Four First Nights		Malayalam
1990	Sandhana Kaatru	Dr Sarath	Tamil
1991	Manjeera Nadam		Telugu
1991	Keechu Raallu		Telugu
1991	Malaichaaral		Tamil
1991	Palleturi Pellam		Telugu
1991	Ranachandi		Kannada
1992	Naangal	Rajasekhar	Tamil
1992	Annaamalai	Ashok	Tamil
1992	Soori		Kannada
1992	Aapad Bandhavudu	Sripathi	Telugu
1992	Sabarimalayil Thanka Sooryodayam		Malayalam
1992	Naalaiya Theerpu	Priya's brother	Tamil
1993	Vedan	Ganesh	Tamil
1993	Manikantana Mahime		Kannada
1993	Puthiya Thendral		Tamil
1993	Nakshatra Poratam		Telugu
1993	Rojavai Killathe	Sathasivam	Tamil
1993	Sivarathiri		Tamil
1993	Kanyakumariyil Oru Kavitha		Malayalam
1994	Captain	Ramasamy	Telugu
1994	Uzhiyan	Anakkal Raj	Tamil
1994	Hello Brother	Chakravarthy	Telugu
1994	Duet	Paramaguru	Tamil
1994	Makkala Sakshi		Kannada
1994	Criminal	Dr Pratap	Telugu
1994	Teerpu	ACP Madhu	Telugu
1995	Muthu	Prince	Tamil
1995	Puthiya Aatchi	Vivekanandan	Tamil
1995	Chandralekha	Shankar	Tamil
1995	Desa Drohulu		Telugu
1995	Pokiri Raja	CM & Brahmam (Dual role)	Telugu
1995	Muddayi Muddugumma	Raja	Telugu
1995	Kolangal	Shankar	Tamil
1995	Sisindri	Sarah Kumar	Telugu
1996	Mahaprabhu	Eswari Pandian	Tamil
1996	Vasantham		Tamil
1996	Love Birds	Prakash	Tamil
1996	Amrutha Varshini	Hemanth	Kannada
1996	Gaaya		Kannada
1996	Akkada Ammayi Ikkada Abbayi	Vishnu Murthy	Telugu
1997	Dongaata	ASP Vikram	Telugu
1997	Thodu		Telugu
1997	Poonilamazha	Chandran	Malayalam
1998	Uyirodu Uyiraga	Chandrasekhar	Tamil
1998	Sandhippoma	Nilani's father	Tamil
1998	Gamyam	Sriram	Telugu
1998	Pelli Pandiri	Inspector Rama Rao	Telugu
1999	Janumadatha	Srichandra Vidyasagar	Kannada
1999	Rythu Rajyam		Telugu
1999	Nilave Mugam Kaattu	Police officer	Tamil
1999	Hrudaya Hrudaya		Kannada
2000	Annayya	Rangarao	Telugu
2000	Bharatha Naari		Kannada
2000	Kadhal Rojavae	Sarath	Tamil
2001	Majnu		Kannada
2001	Neela	Palegar Jagadevaraya	Kannada
2001	Daddy	Doctor	Telugu
2001	Aalavandhan	Tejaswini's father	Tamil
2001	Ishtam	Chakravarthy	Telugu
2002	Law and Order		Kannada
2002	Nuvvu Leka Nenu Lenu	Panduranga Rao	Telugu
2002	Baba	The father of the girl saved by Baba	Tamil
2002	Maaran	District Collector	Tamil
2003	Anbu	Adithya's father	Tamil
2003	Ninne Ishtapaddanu	Sanjana's father	Telugu
2003	Neeke Manasichaanu	Vivek's father	Telugu
2003	Indru Mudhal	Geetha's father	Tamil
2003	Puthiya Geethai	Annamalai	Tamil
2003	Ottran	Manikkavel IPS, IG, Prisons	Tamil
2004	Arul	Doctor	Tamil
2004	Shock	Dr. Rajan	Tamil
2004	Gajendra	Azhagarsamy	Tamil
2004	Kavithai	Subbulakshmi's father	Tamil
2004	Pedababu	Pedababu's step-father	Telugu
2005	Rendella Tharuvatha	Gandham	Telugu
2005	Kannadi Pookal	Child psychiatrist	Tamil
2005	O Priyathama	Nagaraj	Kannada
2006	Kalvanin Kadhali	Sathya's boss	Tamil
2006	Sri Ramadasu	Sage Bhadra	Telugu
2006	Evandoi Srivaru	Chandrasekhar	Telugu
2006	Miss California	Prasad	Kannada
2006	Parijatham	Sumathi/Subhathra father	Tamil
2006	Perarasu	Chakkaravarthi Pandiyan	Tamil
2006	Rocky The Rebel	Ajay Sinha: Rocky's father	Hindi
2006	Student		Kannada
2006	Rakhi	Police Commissioner	Telugu
2007	Aata	Srikrishna's father	Telugu
2007	Shankar Dada Zindabad	Suresh's father	Telugu
2007	Chandrahas	Chatrapati	Telugu
2007	Waking Dreams	Dr Kumar	English
2008	Velli Thirai	Balaji	Tamil
2008	Uliyin Osai	Raja Raja Cholan	Tamil
2008	Souryam	Police Commissioner	Telugu
2008	Payana	Kaveri's father	Kannada
2008	Neenyare		Kannada
2008	Haage Summane		Kannada
2009	Namyajamanru	Dr. Patil	Kannada
2009	Neramu Siksha	Lawyer	Telugu
2009	Magadheera	Maharaj Vikram Singh	Telugu
2009	Kannukulle	Joseph Aruldoss	Tamil
2009	Adada Enna Azhagu	Vaikam	Tamil
2009	Malayn	Meiyappan aka Annachi	Tamil
2010	Nagavalli	Shankar Rao	Telugu
2011	Ilaignan	Deivanayagam	Tamil
2011	It's My Love Story	Vandana's father	Telugu
2012	AK 56		Kannada
2012	Dhoni	Chief Minister	Tamil / Telugu
2012	Shirdi Sai	Mahalsapati	Telugu
2013	Donga Police		Telugu
2013	Masani	Village head	Tamil
2013	Brindavana		Kannada
2013	Backbench Student	Karthik's Father	Telugu
2014	Ramanujan	Diwan Bahadur R Ramachandra Rao ICS	English / Tamil
2014	Aryan		Kannada
2017	Si3	K. C. D. P. Sathyanarayana Reddygaru	Tamil
2018	Nela Ticket	Ananda Bhupathi	Telugu
2018	Next Enti?	Prakash	Telugu
2018	Prashna Parihaara Shaala		Malayalam
2020	Entha Manchivaadavuraa	Siva Prasad	Telugu
2021	Vakeel Saab	Discipline Committee Chairman	Telugu
2023	Vasantha Mullai	Doctor	Tamil
2023	Malli Pelli	Narendra's stepfather	Telugu
2023	Por Thozhil	Kennedy Sebastian	Tamil

=== Dubbing artist ===
List of Sarath Babu dubbing credits
Year	Title	Actor	Notes
1981	Nandu	Suresh	

=== Television ===
List of Sarath Babu television credits
Year	Title	Role	Network	Language
1987	Silandhi vallai		Doordarshan	Tamil
1988	Narendhiranin vinodha vazhakku		Doordarshan	Tamil
1991	Penn		Doordarshan	Tamil
1989	Ivala En Manaivi		Doordarshan	Tamil
1997–2001	Antharangalu		ETV	Telugu
1997	Ethanai Manidhargal		Doordarshan	Tamil
2000–2002	Gopuram	Vasanthan / Jayanthan	Sun TV	Tamil
2000–2001	Janani		ETV	Telugu
2001–2002	Preetigagi		ETV	Kannada
2003–2004	Rekkai Kattiya Manasu		Raj TV	Tamil
2005–2006	Agnigundalu		ETV	Telugu
2013	Rajakumari		Sun TV	Tamil
2014	Mannan Magal		Jaya TV	Tamil

== Awards ==
Nandi Awards

- Best Supporting Actor – Seethakoka Chilaka (1981)
- Best Supporting Actor – O Bharya Katha (1988)
- Best Supporting Actor – Neerajanam (1989)

Other Awards

- Tamil Nadu State Film Award for Best Character Artiste (Male) for the film Malayan (2009).
