= Taxi Driver (1977 film) =

- Directed by: P. N. Menon
- Written by: G. Vivekanandan
- Screenplay by: G. Vivekanandan
- Produced by: C.P Damodharan
- Starring: Raghavan; Kuttyedathi Vilasini; S. P. Pillai; Sharada
- Cinematography: Ashok Kumar
- Music by: Joshi
- Production company: Sathyachithra Movies
- Distributed by: Sathyachithra Movies
- Release date: 14 October 1977
- Country: India
- Language: Malayalam

Taxi Driver is a 1977 Indian Malayalam film, directed by P. N. Menon. The film stars Raghavan, M.G Prakash, S. P. Pillai and Sharada in the lead roles. The film has musical score by Joshi.Ashok Kumar received the Kerala State Film Award for Best Cinematography.

== Cast ==
- Raghavan
- Kuttyedathi Vilasini
- S. P. Pillai
- Sharada
- Satheesh Sathyan
- Vidhubala
- M.G Prakash
- A.T.Samuel (Sam)

== Soundtrack ==
The music was composed by Joshi and the lyrics were written by O. N. V. Kurup and Sreedharan Nair.

No.	Song	Singers	Lyrics	Length (m:ss)
1	"Aakaasham Pazhayoru"	K. J. Yesudas	O. N. V. Kurup	
2	"Raareeraaraaro" (Mulmudi Choodiya)	S. Janaki	O. N. V. Kurup	
3	"Swargaloka Nadhanam Yahovaye"	K. J. Yesudas	Sreedharan Nair	
