= Jensy Gregory =

South Indian film playback singer

- Born: October 23 1961; Kerala, India
- Occupations: Playback singer
- Years active: 1977–1989
- Spouse: Gregory Thomas (m. 1983)

Jensy Gregory (née Anthony), also known mononymously as Jensy (also spelt Jency), is an Indian playback singer who has worked with composers like Ilaiyaraaja in Tamil films.

== Career ==
Jensy Gregory hails from a family of musicians and music came into her life at a very young age. Her debut song was for Malayalam film Vezhambal. She was introduced to the Tamil movie industry in the song "Vaanathu Poonkili" in the movie Thiripurasundari scored by Ilaiyaraaja. Her songs that followed were in many blockbuster movies like Mullum Malarum and Priya.

In September 2010, Srikanth Deva read one of the Jensy interviews and decided to give the talented singer a break in one of the movies that he was composing for. After the song recording was over, both director, John Mahendran and music director were heard saying that even after all these years Jensy's voice had not aged.

== Discography ==
=== Tamil songs ===
Most of her Tamil film songs are scored by Ilaiyaraaja.

Year	Movie	Song	Music director	Co-singers
1978	Tripura Sundari (film)	Vaanathu Poonkili	Ilaiyaraaja	S. Janaki
1978	Mullum Malarum	Adi Penney	Ilaiyaraaja	
1978	Vattathukkul Sathuram	Aada Sonnare	Ilaiyaraaja	
1978	Sonnadhu Nee Thanaa	Alankaara Pon Oonjale	Ilaiyaraaja	
1978	Priya	Ennuyir Neethaane	Ilaiyaraaja	K. J. Yesudas
1979	Puthiya Vaarpugal	Thamthana Namthana	Ilaiyaraaja	B. Vasantha
1979	Puthiya Vaarpugal	Idhayam Poguthey	Ilaiyaraaja	
1979	Niram Maaratha Pookkal	Aayiram Malargaley	Ilaiyaraaja	Malaysia Vasudevan, S. P. Sailaja
1979	Iru Paravaigal		Ilaiyaraaja	
1979	Anbe Sangeetha	Geetha Sangeetha	Ilaiyaraaja	Jayachandran
1979	Kadavul Amaitha Medai	Mayile Mayile	Ilaiyaraaja	S. P. Balasubrahmanyam
1979	Pagalil Oru Iravu	Thottam Konda Rasave	Ilaiyaraaja	Ilayaraja
1979	Azhage Unnai Aarathikkiren	Hey Masthana	Ilaiyaraaja	S. P. Balasubrahmanyam, P. Jayachandran, Vani Jayaram
1979	Mugathil Mugam Paarkkalaam	Akka Oru Rajaathi	Ilaiyaraaja	
1979	Poonthalir	Gnan Gnan Paadanum	Ilaiyaraaja	
1980	Ellam Un Kairasi	Naan Unnai Thirumba Thirumba	Ilaiyaraaja	
1980	Johnny	En Vaanile	Ilaiyaraaja	
1980	Karumbu Vil	Meenkodi Theril	Ilaiyaraaja	
1980	Ullasa Paravaigal	Deiveega Raagam	Ilaiyaraaja	
1980	Thai Pongal	Theertha Karai Thanile		
1980	Karadi	Kaathaaduthu Aasai Koothaaduthu	Gangai Amaran	M. C. Balu
1981	Panimalar	Paniyum Naane Malarum Neeye	Shankar–Ganesh	S. P. Balasubrahmanyam
1981	Tick! Tick! Tick!	Poo Malarndhida Nadamidum	Ilayaraaja	K. J. Yesudas
1981	Alaigal Oivathillai	Kaathal Ooviyam	Ilayaraaja	Ilayaraja
1981	Alaigal Oivathillai	Vaadi En Kapakilange	Ilayaraaja	Bhaskar, Gangai Amaran, Ilayaraja
1982	Eera Vizhi Kaaviyangal	En Gaanam Engu Arangerum	Ilayaraaja	Ilayaraja
1982	Enkeyo Ketta Kural	Aathora Kaathada	Ilayaraaja	
1982	Metti	Kalyanam Ennai Mudddikka	Ilayaraaja	Radhika, Rajesh
1982	Echchil Iravugal	Poothu Nikkuthu Kaadu	Ilayaraaja	Malaysia Vasudevan

=== Malayalam songs ===
Year	Film	Song	Music director	Co-singer	Note
1974	Kunjikkaikal	Kunnimanikkunje	K. K. Antony		
1977	Aval Oru Devaalayam	Dukhathin Mezhuthiri	M. K. Arjunan	L. R. Anjali	
1977	Aval Oru Devaalayam	Naarayanakkili	M. K. Arjunan	P. Susheela	
1977	Harshabaashpam	Ekaadashi Dinamunarnnu	M. K. Arjunan		
1977	Aasheervaadam	Vayaru Vishakkunnu	M. K. Arjunan		
1977	Vezhambal (Ahalyamoksham)	Thiruvaakacharthinu	M. K. Arjunan		
1977	Oru Jaathi Oru Matham	Maangalyam Chaarthiya	Kannur Rajan	K. J. Yesudas	
1983	Veenapoovu	Swapnamkondu Thulaabhaaram	Vidyadharan		
1983	Veenapoovu	Kannimaasathil	Vidyadharan	K. J. Yesudas	
1983	Eettillam	Raaraatti Raaraatti	A. T. Ummer		
1983	Visa	Thaleeppeelikkaattinulliloru	Jithin Shyam	K. J. Yesudas	
1984	Mounam Sammatham	Shyaamam Sundaram		K. G. Markose	
1985	Enikkum Enikkum idaykku	Thumbappoo	M. G. Radhakrishnan		
1985	Mizhiyezhuthiya kaavyam	Oru Pallavi Paadaamo	Prasad EP	Gopan	
1985	Mizhiyezhuthiya kaavyam	Raajakkuyile Neeyarinjo	Prasad EP		
1985	Mizhiyezhuthiya kaavyam	Thenoorum Mohavum	Prasad EP		
1985	Kothi Theerumvare	Aakaasha Gangayil	Kodakara Madhavan	K. J. Yesudas	
1986	Pappan Priyappetta Pappan	Puthan Manavaatti	Alleppey Ranganath	Sindhu Devi	
1987	Aankiliyude Tharattu	Go Back	Shyam		
1987	Maharshi	Naadodi Sheelum	Berny Ignatius	Unni Menon	
1987	Maharshi	Urangu Urangu	Berny Ignatius		
1988	Kambam				
1989	Aval				
