= Andru Peytha Mazhaiyil =

Andru Peidha Mazhaiyil
- Poster
- Directed by: Ashok Kumar
- Screenplay by: Ashok Kumar
- Based on: Fatal Attraction
- Produced by: Ashok Kumar
- Starring: Sarath Babu; Silk Smitha; Saranya
- Cinematography: Ashok Kumar
- Edited by: B. Lenin; V. T. Vijayan
- Music by: Thayanban
- Release date: 10 March 1989
- Country: India
- Language: Tamil

Andru Peytha Mazhaiyil (transl. In the rain of that day) is a 1989 Indian Tamil-language romantic thriller film directed, produced and photographed by Ashok Kumar. The film stars Sarath Babu, Silk Smitha and Saranya. It is a remake of the 1987 American film Fatal Attraction. The film was released on 10 March 1989.

== Plot ==
Rajesh is a happy family man living with his wife Preethi and his daughter Abhi. His friend is Vinodh. He meets Capri by chance. Preethi's mother falls sick and she starts to her home town. On a rainy evening, he meets Capri and starts a steamy affair by chance. She starts haunting him and makes him worried. Preethi senses something weird and suggests a long holiday. They enjoy their trip, while Capri searches for him. All her attempts go in vain. Rajesh asks her to forget him, but she announces her pregnancy. He is shocked and refuses to accept the child. Rajesh's friend suggest to him to go away far from the city so that he could live in peace. Capri has a bad past. She was married and got pregnant, but lost her husband and unborn child in an accident. She becomes mentally ill and since, she wants to keep Rajesh with her forever. She follows Rajesh and finds his new house. Rajesh and family leave for a party to Vinodh's house. Capri kills the rabbit in Rajesh's house and places it in a pressure cooker. He tells his wife about the affair. Preethi calls Capri and warns her not to disturb her family. The next day their daughter goes missing. Capri takes Abi to a park. Preethi gets hit by a car during the search. Rajesh gets violent and tries to kill her. He seeks the help of police to save him from this issue. After a day, Assistant commissioner warns him to be safe as Capri goes missing. She comes in search of Preethi and tries to kill her. Rajesh fights with Capri, meanwhile, Preethi shoots Capri to save Rajesh. The court releases Preethi as she had shot Capri for self-defense. The movie ends on a happy note.

== Cast ==
- Sarath Babu as Rajesh
- Silk Smitha as Capri
- Saranya as Preethi
- Y. G. Mahendran as Vinodh
- Charuhasan

== Soundtrack ==
The soundtrack was composed by Thayanban.

Track listing
No.	Title	Singer(s)	Length
1.	"Vaa Raja"	S. Janaki, Anu
2.	"Sri Ramana"	K. J. Yesudas, Lathika
3.	"Cuckoo Cuckoo"	K. S. Chithra
4.	"Naane Rani"	S. Janaki

== Reception ==
N. Krishnaswamy of The Indian Express wrote, "Ashok Kumar exploited the twilight world between fact and fantasy pertaining to sex [..] and in Andru Peytha Mazhayil he uses from every weapon in his armoury to heighten the play-of-passion effect". Ashok Kumar had hoped that Smitha would win the National Film Award for Best Actress, but she did not.
