= Uchakattam =

- Poster
- Directed by: N. S. Rajbharath
- Written by: N. S. Rajbharath
- Produced by: S. Kannan
- Starring: Sarath Babu; Sunitha; Rajkumar; Y. G. Mahendran
- Cinematography: Diwari
- Edited by: N. Vellaisamy; R. Krishnamoorthy
- Music by: Shankar–Ganesh
- Production company: Surya Arts
- Release date: 12 December 1980
- Running time: 101 minutes
- Country: India
- Language: Tamil

Uchakattam (transl. The Climax) is a 1980 Indian Tamil-language mystery thriller film directed by N. S. Rajbharath and produced by S. Kannan. The soundtrack was composed by the duo Shankar–Ganesh. The film stars Sarath Babu and Sunitha, with Y. G. Mahendran, A. R. Srinivasan and Jayaram playing supporting roles. It was released on 12 December 1980, and became a success. The film was remade in Kannada in 1982 as Prema Matsara.

== Plot ==
The storyline is on how a doctor turns out to be a psychotic killer of his unfaithful wife

== Cast ==
- Sarath Babu as Dr. Kiran
- Sunitha as Latha
- Y. G. Mahendran as Ganesh
- Jayaram as Dr. Bhashim
- Oru Viral Krishna Rao as Guest
- Rajkumar as Raj (cameo appearance)
- Madhan as Mohan
- A. R. Srinivasan as Inspector Ram

== Production ==
The film was initially titled as Mutrupulli (transl. End point); however, poet Vaali found the title to be inauspicious and suggested the title Uchakattam. Art direction was handled by Mohan.

== Soundtrack ==
Music was composed by Shankar–Ganesh and lyrics were written by Vaali.

Track listing
| No. | Title | Singer(s) | Length |
|---|---|---|---|
| 1. | "Siddhar Kuda" | S. P. Balasubrahmanyam |
| 2. | "Ithazhil" | Malaysia Vasudevan, S. Janaki |
