= Ashok Kumar (cinematographer) =

Indian cinematographer (c. 1941–2014)

- Born: Ashok Kumar Aggarwal circa 1941; Allahabad, North-Western Provinces (now a part of Uttar Pradesh), British India
- Died: 22 October 2014 (aged 73); Chennai, Tamil Nadu, India
- Occupations: Cinematographer, film director
- Years active: 1969–2006
- Children: 4 sons
- Awards: Kerala State Film Award for Best Cinematography; Nandi Award for Best Cinematographer; National Film Award for Best Cinematography; Tamil Nadu State Film Award for Best Cinematographer

Ashok Kumar Aggarwal (c. 1941 – 22 October 2014) was an Indian cinematographer who worked mainly in the South Indian film industry. In a career spanning nearly four decades, he worked in over 125 feature films in the Tamil, Telugu, Malayalam, and Hindi languages. Aggarwal was a member of the Indian Society of Cinematographers (ISC).

Born in Allahabad to a Hindi poet, Ashok Kumar obtained a diploma in photography from the Allahabad University. His passion for cinema made him enroll for a course in motion picture photography at the Institute of Film Technology, Adyar, Chennai. Upon graduating from the institute, he made his cinematic debut with the 1969 Malayalam film Janmabhoomi for which he was awarded that year's Kerala State Film Award for Best Cinematography. Subsequently, he won the Kerala State Film Award for Best Cinematography on two occasions: 1973 (Swapnam) and 1977 (Taxi Driver). His association with P. N. Menon in the early 1970s cemented his place in the Malayalam film industry. He also worked with other filmmakers such as Babu Nanthankode, J. D. Thottan, Bharathan, N. Sankaran Nair and Ramu Kariat. He got his break in Tamil cinema with Mahendran's Uthiripookkal (1979). He was associated with Mahendran in most of his films.

Apart from several state government awards, Ashok Kumar was also a recipient of the National Film Award for Best Cinematography. He also directed ten feature films in Telugu, Tamil, and Hindi. He was married and one of his sons, Akash Aggarwal, works as a cinematographer in Tamil cinema.

== Biography ==
Ashok Kumar was born in Allahabad, North-Western Provinces, British India, to Kedarnath Aggarwal, a Hindi poet. He was passionate about cinema right from his childhood despite his family not being connected to films. After obtaining a diploma in photography from the Allahabad University, he decided to join a film institute to pursue a career in filmmaking. Although his family was initially not supportive of his decision, he was allowed to go to Madras rather than Bombay. He gained an admission at the Institute of Film Technology, (now Film and Television Institute of Tamil Nadu) Adyar, for a course in motion photography. At the institute, he was exposed to World cinema including that of Satyajit Ray's. After passing out of the institute, he made his debut as a cinematographer in the 1969 Malayalam film Janmabhoomi. John Sankaramangalam, his teacher at the institute, was its director. The film was funded by Ashok Kumar along with a few of his batchmates at the institute. The film dealt with the theme of religious co-existence and won the Nargis Dutt Award for Best Feature Film on National Integration at the 16th National Film Awards. 1st Kerala State Film Awards, Ashok Kumar was awarded the Best Cinematography for the film. Following that, he received several offers in Malayalam for directors such as P. N. Menon, Babu Nanthankode, J. Sasikumar, Ramu Kariat and Bharathan. His involvement with the Malayalam film industry in the 1970s, earned him two more state government awards—for Swapnam (1973) and Taxi Driver (1977).

In 1978, when the Tamil film director Mahendran was searching for a cinematographer to shoot his directorial debut Mullum Malarum, he approached cinematographer Ramachandra Babu. The latter, who was busy with his film at the time, had suggested Ashok Kumar to Mahendran. However, based on actor Kamal Haasan's suggestion Balu Mahendra was selected for the film. Meanwhile, Mahendran had watched some of Ashok Kumar's Malayalam films and found some of his angles and lighting techniques to be very interesting. For his second film, Uthiripookkal, Mahendran approached Ashok Kumar as Balu Mahendra was busy with his directorial, Azhiyadha Kolangal. The latter accepted the offer this time and made his Tamil cinema debut. Following the film, Ashok Kumar continued to concentrate more on Tamil films. He became Mahendran's regular cinematographer and worked in nine of his twelve films, including Johnny (1980), Nenjathai Killathe (1980), Nandu (1981) and Metti (1982). For his work in Nenjathai Killathe, he won the National Film Award for Best Cinematography and Tamil Nadu State Film Award for Best Cinematographer.

During the mid 1980s, Ashok Kumar concentrated ventured into commercial films. He shot K. Bhagyaraj's Darling, Darling, Darling (1982) and Mundhanai Mudichu (1983). He worked in My Dear Kuttichathan (1984), India's first 3D film. He also worked with S. Shankar in Jeans (1998). His Hindi films include Kamagni (1987), Bawandar (2000) and Kehtaa Hai Dil Baar Baar (2002). Bawandar received international acclaim and won the Best Film award in several international film festivals. Ashok Kumar was awarded the V. Shantaram Award for Best Cinematography for the film.

Ashok Kumar served as jury member of the 43rd National Film Awards. Over his film career, his assistants include P. S. Nivas, Suhasini Maniratnam and B. R. Vijayalakshmi. Contemporary cinematographers such as Ramachandra Babu, P. C. Sreeram, Ravi K. Chandran and Venu have also spoken of being inspired by his work.

== Personal life ==
Ashok Kumar was married and had four sons. Two of his sons, Akash Aggarwal and Sameer Aggarwal are also cinematographers. His family is based in Chennai. Following severe illness in June 2014, Ashok Kumar was admitted to hospitals in Hyderabad and Chennai where he had undergone treatment for a period of about six months before dying on 22 October 2014 at the age of 73 in Chennai.

== Awards ==
=== National Film Award for Best Cinematography ===
- 1980 – Nenjathai Killathe

=== Kerala State Film Award for Best Cinematography ===
- 1969 – Janmabhoomi
- 1973 – Swapnam
- 1977 – Taxi Driver (Black and White)

=== Tamil Nadu State Film Award for Best Cinematographer ===
- 1980 – Nenjathai Killathe
- 1988 – Andru Peytha Mazhaiyil

=== Nandi Award for Best Cinematographer ===
- 2000 – Sri Sai Mahima

=== V. Shantaram Awards ===
- 2000 – Best Cinematography for Bawandar

== Filmography ==
=== As cinematographer ===
- Janmabhoomi (1969)
- Ezhuthaatha Kadha (1970)
- Avalalpam Vaikippoyi (1971)
- Kuttyedathi (1971)
- Kalam Marindi (1972)
- Chembarathi (1972)
- Maappusaakshi (1972)
- Gaayathri (1973)
- Manushyaputhran (1973)
- Darshanam (1973)
- Mazhakkaaru (1973)
- Swapnam (1973)
- Chaayam (1973)
- Kaamini (1974)
- Moham (1974)
- Odakkuzhal (1975)
- Nurayum Pathayum (1977)
- Taxi Driver (1977)
- Guruvayur Kesavan (1977)
- Randu Lokam (1977)
- Aniyara (1978)
- Sathrathil Oru Raathri (1978)
- Randu Janmam (1978)
- Ammuvinte Aattinkutty (1978)
- Njaan Njaan Maathram (1978)
- Aaravam (1978)
- Ee Ganam Marakkumo (1978)
- Jayikkaanaay Janichavan (1978)
- Lovely (1979)
- Devathai (1979)
- Thakara (1979)
- Uthiripookkal (1979)
- Ullasa Paravaigal (1980)
- Pootaadha Pootukkal (1980)
- Kaali (1980)
- Johnny (1980)
- Lorry (1980)
- Malankattu (1980)
- Swattu (1980)
- Nenjathai Killathe (1980)
- Manjil Virinja Pookkal (1980)
- Nandu (1981)
- Metti (1982)
- Azhagiya Kanney (1982)
- Novemberinte Nashtam (1982)
- Eera Vizhi Kaaviyangal (1982)
- Kannodu Kan (1982)
- Thadaakam (1982)
- Darling, Darling, Darling (1982)
- Mundhanai Mudichu (1983)
- Ente Mamattikkuttiyammakku (1983)
- Kaikeyi (1983)
- Parannu Parannu Parannu (1984)
- Kai Kodukkum Kai (1984)
- My Dear Kuttichathan (1984)
- Nokkethadhoorathu Kannum Nattu (1984)
- Kalkki (1984)
- Kanni Rasi (1985)
- Thendrale Ennai Thodu (1985)
- Pillai Nila (1985)
- Aan Paavam (1985)
- Unnidathil Naan (1986)
- Yaaro Ezhuthiya Kavithai (1986)
- Kanne Kaniyamuthe (1986)
- Paaru Paaru Pattanam Paaru (1986)
- Rithubhedam (1987)
- Manaivi Ready (1987)
- Daisy (1988)
- Jeeva (1988)
- Nethiyadi (1988)
- Andru Peytha Mazhaiyil (1989)
- Vetri Vizha (1989)
- Orukkam (1990)
- My Dear Marthandan (1990)
- Nadigan (1990)
- Vasanthakala Paravai (1991)
- Mannan (1992)
- Magudam (1992)
- Suriyan (1992)
- I Love India (1993)
- Indhu (1994)
- Kattumarakaran (1995)
- Ragasiya Police (1995)
- Jeans (1998)
- Malabar Police (1999)
- Bawandar (2000)
- Tales of The Kama Sutra: The Perfumed Garden (2000)
- Sri Sai Mahima (2000)
- Kehtaa Hai Dil Baar Baar (2002)
- Kovilpatti Veeralakshmi (2003)
- Kamasutra Nights (2008)

=== As director and cinematographer ===
- Kamagni (1987; Hindi)
- Ullam Kavarntha Kalvan (1987; Tamil)
- Abhinandana (1988; Telugu)
- Neerajanam (1989; Telugu)
- O Varsham Kurisina Ratri ( 1989; Telugu)
- Andru Peytha Mazhaiyil (1989; Tamil)
- Thambikku Oru Paattu (1991)
- Kaama (1999; Tamil)
- Sri Sai Mahima (2000; Telugu)
- Khajuraho (2002; Hindi)
