= Kamagni =

- LP Vinyl Records Cover
- Directed by: Ashok Kumar
- Produced by: Metro Film Corporation
- Starring: Aloknath; Tina Munim
- Cinematography: Ashok Kumar
- Music by: Ilaiyaraaja
- Release date: 1987
- Running time: 110 minutes
- Country: India
- Language: Hindi

Kamagni is a 1987 Indian Hindi-language film directed by Ashok Kumar, starring Aloknath, Tina Munim, Partha Sarathi Bhattacharya.

== Cast ==
- Aloknath
- Tina Munim
- Partha Sarathi Bhattacharya
- Ashalata
- Ramesh Deo

Seductive stills of Alka Nupur were used for film's publicity despite her not being in the film. This angered her.

== Soundtrack ==
Lyrics: Indeevar

Song	Singer
"Main Haseen Tu Jawan"	Asha Bhosle
"Aa Gaya Sapna Koi Sach Banke, Mil Gaye Saare Sukh Jeevan Ke"	Asha Bhosle, Suresh Wadkar
"Jiske Sahare Rangeen Nazaren, Jeevan Hai Ek Raagini"	Anuradha Paudwal, Suresh Wadkar
"Jage Ja, Jage Ja Ja Ja"	Sharon Prabhakar
