= Nenjathai Killathe =

1980 film by Mahendran

- Poster
- Directed by: Mahendran
- Written by: Mahendran
- Produced by: K. Rajagopal Chetty
- Starring: Suhasini; Sarath Babu; Pratap; Mohan
- Cinematography: Ashok Kumar
- Edited by: A. Paul Duraisingh
- Music by: Ilaiyaraaja
- Production company: Devi Films
- Release date: 12 December 1980
- Running time: 130 minutes
- Country: India
- Language: Tamil

Nenjathai Killathe (transl. Don't Pinch the Heart) is a 1980 Indian Tamil-language romantic drama film written and directed by Mahendran. The film stars Suhasini, Sarath Babu, Pratap and Mohan. It focuses on a girl who is torn between the man she loved, and the man she married.

Nenjathai Killathe is the debut film appearance of Suhasini, and the first major role for Mohan in Tamil. The score and soundtrack were composed by Ilaiyaraaja while the cinematography was handled by Ashok Kumar. The film was shot in Bangalore, mostly around Cubbon Park.

Nenjathai Killathe was released on 12 December 1980, and completed a theatrical run of roughly one year in Madras (now Chennai). The film won three awards each at the 28th National Film Awards and Tamil Nadu State Film Awards in 1981.

== Plot ==
Chandrasekhar and Mala are a married couple; their marital life is miserable due to Mala's irrational behaviour. Mala suspects that Chandrasekhar's classmate Ramya and her husband are having an affair since he visits her often. Chandrasekhar learns of Ramya's love for him only after his marriage to Mala. Ramya remains single and they share a platonic relationship, which antagonises Mala.

Chandrasekhar's sister Viji, who lives with him and Mala, is enthusiastic, fun-loving, and lives on her own terms. One day she bumps into Ram, a mechanic with an inferiority complex. Despite initial conflicts, they slowly become friends.

Pratap, a photographer and distant relative of Chandrasekhar, comes to Chennai from Calcutta and meets Viji. Though Pratap likes Viji, he does not propose to her.

Ram proposes to Viji, who is unsure whether to accept his suit. However, they become closer.

Viji's harmless mischief at home with Mala intensifies when Viji mixes chilli powder in Mala's bath water as punishment for the nuisance Mala creates at home; Mala swears revenge.

Viji accepts Ram's proposal and informs Chandrasekhar, who advises her to reconsider her decision as he feels they are incompatible. However, seeing her persistence, he approves. Ram's parents visit Viji's house to meet Chandrasekhar and take the proposal forward; as he is absent, they meet Mala, who lies to them about an abortion Viji had, as a result of a stray relationship. Shocked, they inform Ram that they have heard this from a doctor, to keep the informer's identity a secret.

Ram confronts Viji and asks her to clarify, saying he would decide the future course of action based on her reply. Angered with Ram's lack of trust in her, she ends her relationship with him. Seeing a depressed Viji, Chandrasekhar advises her to marry Pratap, as he is mature enough for her. Initially reluctant, she eventually agrees and marries Pratap. When Viji is leaving for her new life with Pratap, she is further upset when Mala proudly declares that it was she who derailed her wedding with Ram by misleading his parents.

Post marriage, Viji is unable to accept Pratap as her husband and stays aloof. Pratap too is not demanding and patiently waits for her to become normal. Viji is unable to forget her past, and her indifference affects Pratap's creativity and work.

Ram, in the meantime, has gotten married, and soon moves in with his wife to the same apartment complex as Viji and becomes her neighbour; Viji gets all the more disturbed. Pratap loses his job and plans to relocate to Calcutta. He reserves tickets for Viji as well, but lets her decide if she wants to accompany him.

When Viji is undecided, Ram invites her to his home. He shows her his physically disabled wife, whom he had married to atone for doubting Viji's character. Ram says that despite his wife's disability, he tries to live happily with her and asks Viji why she cannot do so with Pratap, who is more qualified than him, instead of thinking about their past and the grouse of losing the life she dreamt of. Realising her mistake of spoiling her present by living in the past, Viji rushes to meet Pratap at the airport and joins him.

== Cast ==
- Suhasini as Viji
- Sarath Babu as Chandrasekhar
- Pratap as Pratap
- Mohan as Ram
- V. A. Moorthy as the garage owner
- Manohar as Keech
- Kumarimuthu as Chintamani
- Shanthi Williams as Mala
- Samikannu as Ram's father
- Senthamarai as Mala's father
- Venkatraman as the photographer
- Vanitha as Ramya
- Charuhasan as Pratap's boss (guest appearance)

== Production ==
=== Development ===
Mahendran was approached by Devi Films to make a film for their company to which he agreed and he narrated a plot which impressed them and they decided to produce it. Once while staying in a Bombay hotel, Mahendran looked out of his window and saw a woman jogging. According to him, "Her concern was just fitness. Would it be the same once she gets married? I wondered." This led to him developing the screenplay of the film that would become Nenjathai Killathe. Gaurishankar of Devi Films was impressed by the plot and Mahendran wanted him to produce the film on this story instead of the one they approved earlier to which he agreed. The film was produced by Nanjappa Chettiar of Devi Films, photographed by Ashok Kumar, and edited by A. Paul Duraisingam. The costume designing was done by Jeyaraj, a reputed artist.

=== Casting and filming ===
For the lead characters, Mahendran wanted to cast new actors, so he invited actors from various cities but none of them satisfied him. Suhasini, then a camera-assistant to Ashok Kumar, was spotted by Mahendran during the filming of his previous venture Uthiripookkal (1979). During the making of Uthiripookkal, Suhasini used to visit her father Charuhasan, who was a part of the film's cast. Impressed by her speech and behaviour, Mahendran decided to cast her as Viji in Nenjathai Killathe. Initially, Suhasini was reluctant to take up acting as she wanted to become a cinematographer. However, she agreed to do the film after being convinced by her father. According to Suhasini, Padmini Kolhapure was the original choice for Viji, but could not accept the role for some reason.

Mahendran chose Mohan to play Ram after watching him in the Kannada film Kokila (1977). This was the first time Mohan played a major role in a Tamil film. Pratap Pothen was cast as the photographer Pratap, with the role being a departure from the psychotic/obsessive roles he was previously known for. The film was shot in Bangalore, mostly around Cubbon Park. A song where Mohan and Suhasini's characters go jogging in the morning was the first to be shot, it was shot as early as 4:00 am; despite the thick mist and lack of sunlight, Ashok Kumar managed to shoot the scene successfully.

== Soundtrack ==
The soundtrack was composed by Ilaiyaraaja. Lyrics were written by Gangai Amaran and Panchu Arunachalam. For the song "Paruvamae" which depicts characters jogging, Ilaiyaraaja created the jogging sound by telling his tabla player to tap his thigh. For the dubbed Telugu version Mouna Geetham, all songs were written by Aatreya.

Tamil
No.	Title	Lyrics	Singer(s)	Length
1.	"Hey Thendralae"	Gangai Amaran	P. Susheela	4:33
2.	"Paruvame Puthiya Paadal Paadu"	Panchu Arunachalam	S. P. Balasubrahmanyam, S. Janaki	4:16
3.	"Uravenum Pudhiya Vaanil"	Gangai Amaran	S. P. Balasubrahmanyam, S. Janaki	5:31
4.	"Mummy Peru"	Gangai Amaran	S. Janaki, Vennira Aadai Moorthy	4:32
Total length:				18:52

Telugu
No.	Title	Singer(s)	Length
1.	"Paruvama"	S. P. Balasubrahmanyam, S. Janaki	4:24
2.	"Chelimilo Valapu Ragam"	S. P. Balasubrahmanyam, S. Janaki	4:57
3.	"Naa Ragame"	P. Susheela	4:20
Total length:			13:41

== Release and reception ==
Nenjathai Killathe was released on 12 December 1980. Ananda Vikatan felt the film was another attempt to change the taste of the audience, which should be welcomed and the audience was unable to cope with the speed of change but slowly the gap was reducing. Nalini Shastry of Kalki praised Mahendran's direction for portraying emotions by staying away from typical cliches of Tamil cinema and also creating strong characters, calling Ashok Kumar's cinematography as poetic while also praising the performances of actors especially Suhasini, Ilaiyaraaja's music but found slow pace as the only negative of the film. The film completed a theatrical run of roughly one year in Madras (now Chennai). Although Suhasini was hesitant, her performance in the film received rave reviews. V. Shantaram, the chairman of the 28th National Film Awards, appreciated the opening scene and climax of the film shown in "intercut", which shows Suhasini jogging and rushing to the airport to catch her husband respectively. It was also screened at the Indian Panorama section of the International Film Festival of India. K. S. Rama Rao bought the dubbing rights and released it in Telugu as Mouna Geetham.

== Accolades ==
At the 28th National Film Awards, the film won in three categories: Best Feature Film in Tamil, Best Cinematography (Colour) for Ashok Kumar, and Best Audiography for S. P. Ramanathan. According to Sarath Babu, he was a strong contender for the Best Supporting Actor award, but missed "by a whisker". The film also won three Tamil Nadu State Film Awards: Best Film (Second prize), Best Actress (Suhasini) and Best Cinematographer (Ashok Kumar).

== Bibliography ==
- Dhananjayan, G. (2011). The Best of Tamil Cinema, 1931 to 2010: 1977–2010. Galatta Media. OCLC 733724281.
- Mahendran (2013) [2004]. சினிமாவும் நானும் [Cinema and I] (in Tamil). Karpagam Publications. OCLC 54777094.
