= Sudhakar =

Sudhakar is an Indian name and may refer to:

- Sudhakar (actor) (born 1959), Indian actor
- Patel Sudhakar Reddy (died 2009), member of the central committee of the Communist Party of India
- Sudhakar Chaturvedi (born 1897), Vedic scholar in Bangalore in Karnataka, India
- Sudhakar Rao (born 1952), former Indian cricketer
- Suravaram Sudhakar Reddy (born 1942), member of the 12th and 14th Lok Sabha of India, represents the Nalgonda constituency
- R Sudhakar (born 1959), Judge of the Indian Judiciary
- K. Sudhakar (politician), Indian politician
- K. Sudhakar (automobile designer), designer and owner of Sudha Cars Museum

== Other uses ==
- Sudhakar, a 20th-century Bengali weekly magazine.
