= Uthiripookkal =

1979 film by Mahendran

- Theatrical release poster
- Directed by: Mahendran
- Screenplay by: Mahendran
- Based on: "Chitrannai" by Pudhumaipithan
- Produced by: Radha Balakrishnan
- Starring: Vijayan; Ashwini; Madhu Malini
- Cinematography: Ashok Kumar
- Edited by: B. Lenin
- Music by: Ilaiyaraaja
- Production company: Dimple Creations
- Release date: 19 October 1979
- Running time: 114–143 minutes (Note: While the runtime is listed as 143 minutes in Encyclopaedia of Indian Cinema, the version screened at the 1979/1980 International Film Festival of India was 114 minutes long.)
- Country: India
- Language: Tamil

Uthiripookkal (transl. Unstrung Flowers) is a 1979 Indian Tamil-language drama film, written and directed by Mahendran. Based on the short story "Chitrannai" (transl. Stepmother) by Pudhumaipithan, it stars Vijayan, Ashwini and Madhu Malini. The film focuses on a sadistic man who makes life miserable for everyone in his village, including his wife and children.

While adapting the short story, Mahendran made substantial changes to the screenplay, especially with the treatment of the lead character. The film was produced by his friend Radha Balakrishnan, photographed by Ashok Kumar and edited by B. Lenin in his debut, with music composed by Ilaiyaraaja. It is the acting debut for many, including Ashwini, Charuhasan, Bhoopathy, and Charulatha. The film was shot primarily at Palapatti near Mettupalayam and Vellipalayam.

Uthiripookkal was released on 19 October 1979. The film was a critical and commercial success, running for 175 days in theatres. Mahendran won the Filmfare Award for Best Tamil Director and S. Janaki won the Tamil Nadu State Film Award for Best Female Playback Singer. In 2013, News18 included the film in its list of 100 greatest Indian films of all time. Although no print of Uthiripookkal is known to survive, the film is still available on home video. The film was remade in Telugu as Pasidi Moggalu (1980).

== Plot ==
Sundaravadivelu is a rich but sadistic villager. He is also the manager of the local school, and manages it authoritatively without respecting anyone; he siphons the school's money for his own wants. Sundaravadivelu lives with his chronically ill wife Lakshmi and their two children: son Raja and daughter Bhavani. Lakshmi's father Thambusamy, a pensioner, lives in the same village with his second daughter Shenbagam. Sundaravadivelu, who has lent money to Thambusamy, keeps demanding it back and also insults him on several occasions. Shenbagam falls in love with Prakash, a new teacher in the school. Sundaravadivelu does not approve of their relationship as he wants to marry Shenbagam, citing Lakshmi's chronic illness. He puts the proposal before his father-in-law and offers to write off his debt if he agrees. However, Thambusamy does not agree and Sundaravadivelu vents his anger on his wife.

Bhavani falls sick, and Lakshmi takes her to the recently appointed village health inspector. When they meet, they realise that they had been neighbours some years back and had met when he had come to meet her father to seek her hand in marriage. By then, Lakshmi was already engaged to Sundaravadivelu, hence the health inspector left in disappointment. Recollecting this, he tries to help her. When Thambusamy, unable to tolerate the harassment of his son-in-law, plans to leave the village, the health inspector offers money to settle the loan. When Sundaravadivelu learns this, he alleges an extramarital affair between his wife and the health inspector. With the help of the village panchayat, he throws Lakshmi out of his house, keeping the children with himself. The health inspector leaves the village to avoid causing further strain in Lakshmi's life, while Lakshmi goes to her father's place. Unable to withstand separation from her children, she dies.

Sundaravadivelu marries another woman and neglects his children, who keep visiting Shenbagam for food and care. Prakash meets Thambusamy and proposes to marry Shenbagam; Thambusamy readily accepts, and the marriage is fixed. Prakash tells Sundaravadivelu that the school's management has learnt about his mismanagement and has decided to take action against him. Shenbagam visits Sundaravadivelu to seek custody of his children so she can take care of them. Sundaravadivelu, who is jealous of her new status and enraged that she rejected his marriage proposal, degrades her modesty by undressing her forcibly and proudly declares that he is the first person to see her nude; he further taunts Shenbagam by saying that whenever her husband sees her, she would be reminded of this incident. Sundaravadivelu's wife witnesses this and disowns him. The villagers too learn of this; angered, they corner Sundaravadivelu, take him to the river and ask him to choose his way of death. Sundaravadivelu, remorseful over turning the peaceful villagers into a vengeful mob, shares a tender moment with his children, then drowns himself in the river.

== Cast ==
- Vijayan as Sundaravadivelu
- Ashwini as Lakshmi
- Madhu Malini as Shenbagam
- Sundar as Prakash
- Sarath Babu as the health inspector
- Charuhasan as Thambuswamy
- Baby Anju as Bhavani
- Master Haja Sheriff as Raja
- Charulatha as Sundaravadivelu's second wife
- Samikannu as Karuppiah
- Bhoopathy as Sundaravadivelu's brother
- C. T. Rajakantham as Sundaravadivelu's mother
- Venkatraman as Venkatraman

== Production ==
=== Development ===
After the success of his directorial debut Mullum Malarum (1978), Mahendran was flooded with further directorial offers by producers. But he decided to make his next film with newcomers instead of stars. The film would be Uthiripookkal, an adaptation of the short story "Chitrannai" by Pudhumaipithan, which Mahendran read when he was in school and according to him it had impacted his life. While reading the short story, Mahendran was completely attracted by the plot and made many changes into the screenplay according to his own wish. The character Sundaravadivelu was shown in the film as less sympathetic than the short story version, and the child character Raja, who was killed off in the short story, was changed to live on in the film.

The title Uthiripookkal was suggested by composer Ilaiyaraaja. Ashok Kumar handled the cinematography, while B. Lenin made his debut as editor with the film. Mahendran himself produced the film under the banner Dimple Creations, named after his daughter and he had chosen his friend Radha Balakrishnan to handle production duties. Mahendran requested Balakrishnan to pay royalties to Pudhumaipithan's family to which Balakrishnan initially hesitated as he found the screenplay of Uthiripookkal to be very different from "Chittranai" but later relented.

=== Casting and filming ===
Mahendran cast Vijayan as Sundaravadivelu at the last minute. Debutant Ashwini from Bangalore was chosen to portray Sundaravadivelu's first wife Lakshmi, and her voice was dubbed by Anuraatha Rajkrishna. Other newcomer actors were Kamal Haasan's brother Charuhasan, Manorama's son Bhoopathy, and Charulatha. The film was launched with the song recording of "Azhagiya Kanne". It was shot primarily at Palapatti near Mettupalayam and Vellipalayam. The filming was completed within 30 days.

== Themes ==
Uthiripookkal deals with domestic violence, sadism, and feminism. According to Ram Chander of Film Companion, the character of Sundaravadivelu "represents the filth in the hearts of all men and the climax is a call to destroy that demon so that we can move on as a society. Seen this way, Uthiripookkal is much more than just the tale of a solitary sadist and how he meets his end."

== Soundtrack ==
The soundtrack was composed by Ilaiyaraaja. The song "Naan Paada" is set in the Carnatic raga known as Kalyani. The flute portions in "Azhagiya Kanne" were performed by Sudhakar.

Track listing
No.	Title	Lyrics	Singer(s)	Length
1.	"Azhagiya Kanne"	Kannadasan	S. Janaki	4:52
2.	"Naan Paada"	M. G. Vallabhan	S. Janaki	4:56
3.	"Kalyanam Paaru"	Muthulingam	S. P. Sailaja	4:31
4.	"Poda Poda"	Muthulingam	S. Janaki	3:51
5.	"Yae Intha Poongathu"	Gangai Amaran	Ilaiyaraaja	2:40
Total length:				20:50

== Release and reception ==
Uthiripookkal was released on 19 October 1979. The Tamil magazine Ananda Vikatan, in a review dated 4 November 1979, rated the film 60 out of 100. It is among the magazine's highest-rated films. Kausikan of Kalki praised Mahendran for adapting "Chitrannai" beautifully for the screen and portraying every frame as a painter while also praising the performances of actors and cinematography. The Indian Express wrote on 20 October, "[Uthiripookkal] is a celluloid poem. It is for the Tamil people to decide whether they want meaningful films or just movies." The Hindu wrote on 26 October, "This colour movie is bound to change the fate of [the] Tamil film industry provided the producers take the cue."

Naagai Dharuman of Anna praised Mahendran for adapting a short story and making a film with quality and for handling scenes with realism. He also appreciated natural dialogues, actors for living as characters instead of acting, Ilaiyaraaja's music, Ashok Kumar's cinematography and concluded calling it flowers that do not fall in the mind and spread fragrance. The film was a commercial success, running for 175 days in theatres and becoming a silver jubilee film. Mahendran won the Filmfare Award for Best Tamil Director, and S. Janaki won the Tamil Nadu State Film Award for Best Female Playback Singer. The film was screened at the 1979/1980 International Film Festival of India as part of its Indian Panorama section. (Note: Indian Panorama is a flagship component of the IFFI under which the best of contemporary Indian films are selected for the promotion of film art.)

== Legacy ==
Uthiripookkal is considered a landmark film in Tamil cinema. After watching the film, many people who also read the source material thronged bookstores to read it again because of the differences between the two. In a 2002 interview with The Hindu, director Mani Ratnam remarked "If I get anywhere near what Mahendran did in [Uthiripookkal], I’ll be a happy man." The Times of India wrote, "1979 was the year of Uthiripookkal". On the centenary of Indian cinema in April 2013, IBNLive (later known as News18) included the film in its list of 100 greatest Indian films of all time. Filmmakers like AR Murugadoss and Pa. Ranjith have recognised the film as one of their favourites.

== Bibliography ==
- Mahendran (2013) [2004]. சினிமாவும் நானும் [Cinema and I] (in Tamil). Karpagam Publications. OCLC 54777094.
- Rajadhyaksha, Ashish; Willemen, Paul (1998) [1994]. Encyclopaedia of Indian Cinema. British Film Institute and Oxford University Press. ISBN 0-19-563579-5.
- Sundararaman (2007) [2005]. Raga Chintamani: A Guide to Carnatic Ragas Through Tamil Film Music (2nd ed.). Chennai: Pichhamal Chintamani. OCLC 295034757.
