= Mahendran (filmmaker) =

Indian filmmaker (1939–2019)

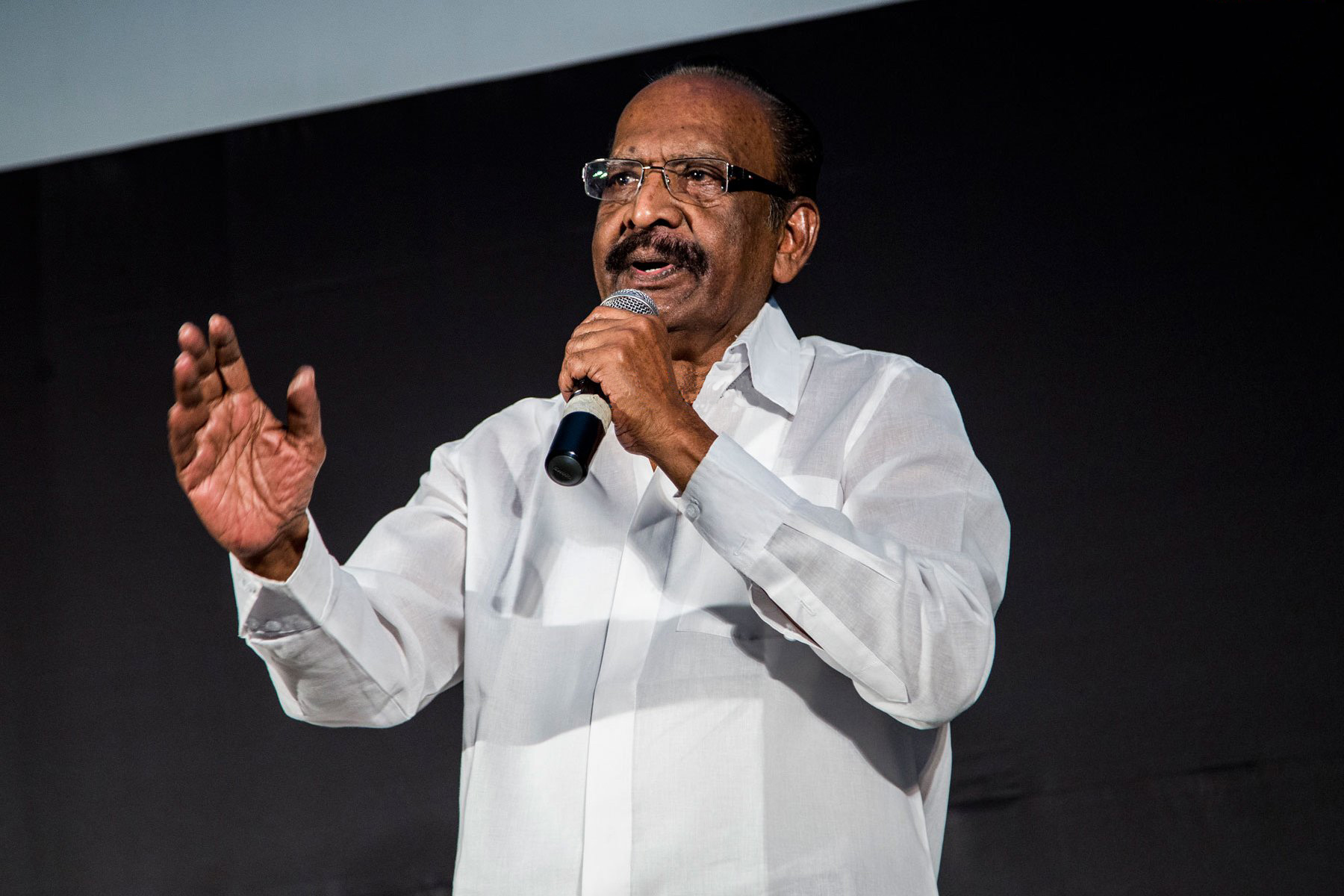
- Mahendran in April 2016
- Born: J. Alexander; 25 July 1939; Ilaiyangudi, Madras Presidency, British India
- Died: 2 April 2019 (Aged 79); Chennai
- Occupations: Film director; screenwriter; actor; literary editor
- Years active: 1966–2006, 2016–2019
- Spouse: Jasmine
- Children: John Mahendran
- Family: Rajesh (Cousin)

J. Alexander (25 July 1939 – 2 April 2019), known professionally as Mahendran, was an Indian film director, screenwriter and actor, known for his work in the Tamil film industry. Mahendran is regarded as one of the greatest film makers of Indian cinema and has influenced several filmmakers of the generations that followed.

Mahendran entered the film industry as a screenwriter, writing scripts for nearly 26 films. He made an immediate impact with his first directional venture Mullum Malarum (1978). Mahendran's next film Uthiripookkal, based on a short story written by Pudumaipithan, firmly established him as an important filmmaker in Tamil cinema. His Nenjathai Killathe won three National Film Awards including the award for the best regional film.

He has also acted in films during the latter part of his film career, including Kamaraj (2004), Theri (2016), Nimir (2018) and Petta (2019).

== Biography ==
Mahendran was born on 25 July 1939 to Joseph Chelliah, a teacher and Manonmani. Mahendran did his schooling in Ilayangudi and completed his intermediate at American College, Madurai. Later he joined Alagappa Government Arts College to do a Bachelor of Arts in Economics. During his college days, he was very active in stage plays. It was during that time when M. G. Ramachandran (M.G.R.) was invited as the chief guest for the college day during which Mahendran gave a speech that directly criticized the commercial elements that existed in cinema. Impressed by his speech M.G.R. praised Mahendran and said that he could become a good critic. After completing his degree, he went to Madras to study law. Seven months after joining the course he had to discontinue due to financial concerns. He then decided to go back to Ilayangud. However, on the insistence of Karaikudi Kannappa Valliappan he joined Inamuzhakkam, a periodical as a journalist. It was during this time he met M.G.R. again and he was asked to write the screenplay of Ponniyin Selvan after the former decided to make a film based on the story. The idea of developing the screenplay into a film got delayed, and M.G.R. asked Mahendran to write a story for his drama troupe. Mahendran wrote a script titled Anaadhaigal. M.G.R. decided to make a film based on the play. He named the film Vaazhve Vaa and acted in the lead role alongside Savitri. The project got shelved after three days of shooting. Soon M.G.R. acted in a film called Kaanchi Thalaivan and he recommended Mahendran to the director to make him an assistant.

Mahendran made his breakthrough as a screenwriter for the film Naam Moovar in 1966. After the success of the film he got more offers from the same banner and worked in films like Sabaash Thambi and Panakkara Pillai, both released in the subsequent years. He also wrote the script for Nirakudam starring Sivaji Ganesan. He announced that he was working on a new film in 2014 starring newcomers, for which Ilaiyaraaja would score music. He also worked as an actor in the films Kamaraj (2004), Theri (2016), and Nimir (2018).

Mahendran died on 2 April 2019, at the age of 79.

== Awards ==
- Filmfare Award for Best Film – Tamil – Mullum Malarum (1978)
- Filmfare Award for Best Director – Tamil – Uthiripookkal (1979)
- National Film Award for Best Feature Film in Tamil – Nenjathai Killathe (1980)
- IIFA Utsavam Best Actor for Performance in a Negative Role – Theri (2016)

== Filmography ==
=== As a film director ===
Year	Film	Notes
1978	Mullum Malarum	
1979	Uthiripookkal	
1980	Poottaatha Poottukkal	
1980	Johnny	
1980	Nenjathai Killathe	
1981	Nandu	
1982	Metti	
1982	Azhagiya Kanne	
1984	Kai Kodukkum Kai	
1986	Kannukku Mai Ezhuthu	
1992	Oor Panjayathu	
2006	Sasanam	Also costume designer

=== As a writer ===
Year	Film	Credited as			Notes
Year	Film	Story	Screenplay	Dialogues	Notes
1966	Naam Moovar	✓			
1967	Sabash Thambi	✓			
1968	Panakkara Pillai	✓			
1969	Nirai Kudam	✓			
1972	Ganga	✓			
1974	Thirudi	✓			
1974	Thangapathakkam	✓		✓	
1975	Nambikkai Natchathiram	✓		✓	
1975	Vaazhnthu Kaattugiren	✓		✓	
1975	Avalukku Aayiram Kangal	✓		✓	
1976	Vazhvu En Pakkam	✓		✓	
1976	Mogam Muppadhu Varusham		✓	✓	
1977	Sonthamadi Nee Enakku	✓		✓	
1977	Chakravarthy	✓		✓	
1977	Sonnathai Seiven		✓	✓	
1977	Aadu Puli Attam	✓		✓	
1979	Pagalil Oru Iravu			✓	
1980	Challenge Ramudu	✓			Telugu film
1980	Rishi Moolam	✓		✓	
1980	Kaali	✓		✓	
1982	Hitler Umanath	✓			
1984	Anbulla Malare		✓	✓	
1991	Thaiyalkaran	✓		✓	
1992	Naangal	✓			
1999	Kallazhagar			✓	

=== As an actor ===
Year	Title	Role	Language	Notes
2004	Kamaraj	K. Rajaram	Tamil	
2016	Theri	Vanamaamalai	Tamil	
2017	Katamarayudu	Machappa	Telugu	
2018	Nimir	Shanmugham	Tamil	
2018	Mr. Chandramouli	Azhagar	Tamil	
2018	Seethakaathi	Judge	Tamil	
2019	Boomerang	Judge	Tamil	
2019	Petta	Rajapandi	Tamil	
2019	Rustum	Durga Prasad	Kannada	Posthumous release
2021	Pon Manickavel	Nasrathullah	Tamil	Posthumous release
2022	Kombu Vatcha Singamda	Deivendran	Tamil	Posthumous release
