= 36th Filmfare Awards South =

Award ceremony for South Indian films

- Date: 13 August 1989
- Site: Music Academy Hall Madras, Tamil Nadu, India
- Hosted by: Shobana

The 36th Filmfare Awards South ceremony honoring the winners of the best of South Indian cinema in 1988 was an event held on 13 August 1989. The president of this year's function was Dr. M. Tamilkudimagan, Speaker of the Tamil Nadu Legislative assembly. The chief guest of the evening was the actor Dev Anand.

== Awards ==
=== Kannada cinema ===
Best Film	Best Director
Aasphota - V. Verghese	Dinesh Babu - Suprabhatha
Best Actor	Best Actress
Vishnuvardhan - Suprabhatha	Suhasini - Suprabhatha

=== Malayalam cinema ===
Best Film	Best Director
1921 - Mohammed Mannil	Padmarajan - Aparan
Best Actor	Best Actress
Mohanlal - Paadha Mudra	Revathi - Kakkothikkavile Appooppan Thaadikal

=== Tamil cinema ===
Best Film	Best Director
Agni Natchathiram - G. Venkateswaran	Balu Mahendra - Veedu
Best Actor	Best Actress
Karthik - Agni Natchathiram	Archana - Veedu

=== Telugu cinema ===
Best Film	Best Director
Swarna Kamalam - Appa Rao Ch V.	M. V. Raghu - Kallu
Best Actor	Best Actress
Venkatesh - Brahma Putrudu	Bhanupriya - Swarna Kamalam

=== Special awards ===
Lifetime Achievement Award
- Bhanumathi Ramakrishna (Actress)

== Awards Presentation ==
- V. Verghese (Best Film Kannada) Received Award from D. Ramanaidu
- I. V. Sasi Receives Mohammed Mannil Award (Best Film Malayalam) from L. V. Prasad
- Appa Rao Ch V. (Best Film Telugu) Received Award from S. Balachander
- G. Venkateswaran (Best Film Tamil) Received Award from Dev Anand
- Suresh Babu Receives Dinesh Babu Award (Best Director Kannada) from Girija
- Padmarajan (Best Director Malayalam) Received Award from Swapna
- Balu Mahendra (Best Director Tamil) Received Award from Bharathi Raja
- Suhasini (Best Actress Kannada) Received Award from Sivakumar
- Revathi (Best Actress Malayalam) Received Award from Mani Rathnam
- Bhanupriya (Best Actress Telugu) Received Award from Sathyaraj
- Archana (Best Actress Tamil) Received Award from Sowcar Janaki
- Vishnuvardhan (Best Actor Telugu) Received Award from K. Vishwanath
- Venkatesh (Best Actor Telugu) Received Award from K. Balaji
- Karthik (Best Actor Tamil) Received Award from Boney Kapoor
- Bhanumathi Ramakrishna (For Outstanding Contribution to Indian Films) Received Award from M. Tamilkudimagan
