= List of awards and nominations received by Vishnuvardhan =

The following is a list of awards received by Vishnuvardhan throughout his acting career.

Filmfare Awards South

Filmfare Award for Best Kannada Actor - 4 times:

- Naagarahaavu - 1973 Special Award
- Bandhana - 1984 Special Award
- Suprabhatha - 1988 Best Actor
- Haalunda Thavaru - 1994 (Best Actor)
- Yajamana - 2000 (Best Actor)
- Apthamitra - 2004 (Best Actor)
- Filmfare Lifetime Achievement Award - 2002.

Karnataka State Film Awards

Karnataka State Film Awards for the Best Actor Category: Seven Times

- Naagarahaavu – 1972-73
- Hombisilu – 1977-78
- Bandhana – 1984-85
- Lion Jagapathi Rao – 1990-91
- Laali – 1997-98
- Veerappa Nayaka – 1998-99
- Aaptha Rakshaka – 2009-10 (Posthumously)
- Lifetime achievement Award Dr. Rajkumar Award - 2008

Cinema Express Awards

Cinema Express Awards for the Best Actor Category:

- Suprabhatha – 1988 - (Best Actor)
- Rayaru Bandaru Mavana Manege – 1993 - (Best Actor)
- Yajamana – 2000 - (Best Actor)

Other awards

- Honorary Doctorate awarded by Bangalore University in 2005
- Aragini Reader's Award
- Suvarna Lifetime Achievement Award for Contribution To Kannada Cinema 2008
- Tarangini Berkley Award
- Indira Pratishtana National Award
- V Shantaram award Best Actor for Parva
- Kaladevi Award (Chennai)
- Suvarna Film Award for Favorite Hero 2011
- Madras Films Association Award
- Kerala Cultural And Art Award
- Rajyotsava Award - 1990
- R.N.R Award
- Videocon Suprabhata Film Viewers Award
- Maharaja of Hot Rain Songs by Indian Gilma Society

Karnataka Ratna-2025 Highest Civilian Award of Karnataka
