= Vettri Vizhaa =

1989 Indian film directed by Prathap K. Pothen

- Theatrical release poster
- Directed by: Prathap K. Pothen
- Screenplay by: Prathap K. Pothen
- Story by: K. Rajeshwar; Shanmugapriyan
- Based on: The Bourne Identity by Robert Ludlum
- Produced by: Santhi Narayanasamy; T. Manohar
- Starring: Kamal Haasan; Prabhu
- Cinematography: Ashok Kumar
- Edited by: B. Lenin; V. T. Vijayan
- Music by: Ilaiyaraaja
- Production company: Sivaji Productions
- Release date: 28 October 1989
- Running time: 143 minutes
- Country: India
- Language: Tamil

Vettri Vizhaa (transl. Ceremony of Victory) is a 1989 Indian Tamil-language action film directed by Prathap K. Pothen. It stars Kamal Haasan, Prabhu, pairing with Sasikala and Khushbu as lead heroine along with Amala in guest appearance. The film was a blockbuster and completed 175-day run at the box office. It is loosely based on the novel The Bourne Identity by Robert Ludlum.

Vettri Vizhaa was released on 28 October 1989 during the Diwali holiday. Santhi Narayanasamy and T. Manohar produced Vettri Vizhaa under the production company Sivaji Productions. The story was written by K. Rajeshwar and Shanmugapriyan. Cinematography was handled by Ashok Kumar, the editing was by B. Lenin and V. T. Vijayan, and the art direction was by B. Salim. The first film in which Kamal Haasan and Prabhu co-starred. Filming took place primarily in Goa and Chennai.

== Plot ==
A man (Kamal Haasan) is being chased by heavily armed men in a coastline. He takes out a couple of them with his superior skills, but is shot down from a hanging ladder in the helicopter trying to rescue him. He washes up on the shores of Goa unconscious and is rescued by Shirley (Sasikala), who brings him to her doctor aunt (Sowcar Janaki).

When he wakes up, he realises that he has amnesia and has a few flashes of sculptures and a karate class, but does not recognise them. Meanwhile, a local rowdy has been harassing the doctor and her niece. The man manages to thwart their next attack easily, which makes him believe that he might be trained in martial arts. Since the man has enraged the rowdy, the doctor pleads with him to marry her niece for her own protection. He does so and thwarts another attack from the rowdy during their wedding.

Right after, he decides to leave for Madras to find his identity with his new wife in tow. Soon they find out that the earlier flashes he had are of the sculptures in Connemara Hotel and he used to be a regular there. After getting the bank account number he has used previously in the hotel, he visits the bank and is once again surprised to find out that he was a regular to the bank too and has a locker with a large amount of money, multiple passports of him and a hand gun.

While leaving the bank, he is attacked by an unknown assailant in the lift but he once again successfully maims the assailant and escapes, but leaves a shocked witness. His bank locker contents along with his martial arts skills make him believe that he might have been involved in gangs before and decides to surrender to police but is talked out of it by his wife.

Vijay (Prabhu) and Jaya (Khushbu) are part of a wedding band. The man decides to uncover another one of his flashes and tries to locate the karate class. In one such class, the instructor recognizes him, but guides him towards a singer Disco Shanti and tells him that he might be in danger. Another group of assailants attack him, and Vijay and Jaya are caught in the chaos. Believing Vijay to be helping the man, they kidnap Jaya and demand the surrender of the man, but Vijay and the man team up to rescue Jaya, which makes Vijay pledge to help the man in his quest.

The man then goes to talk to the singer, but is soon recognized and is shot at. The singer helps him escape and gives him a phone number to contact but is seriously wounded. He contacts the number and barely escapes another attempt on his life, but manages to meet the person who the singer referred to, which happens to be Nithyanandam, the Deputy Inspector General of Police.

He finally learns of his true identity. His name is Vetrivel, and he was happily married to Lalitha (Amala Akkineni), and was an undercover IPS officer who teamed up with the DIG to bring down a notorious hit man Zinda (Salim Ghouse). Unable to find any information about Zinda's whereabouts, they devise a plan to make Vetri go undercover and make him a bigger and more dangerous hit man than Zinda, hoping Zinda would get in touch with his fiercest competitor. The plan works, and soon Zinda and Vetri become friends. However, Zinda learns about an undercover police officer in his gang through a spy and kidnaps Lalitha to draw out the mole. Vetri breaks his cover to protect Lalitha, but she is shot and killed, and Vetri is chased (the opening in the movie), but escapes barely.

Vetri puts the pieces back together and uncovers a plot by Zinda to assassinate a very popular priest, Baba Appaji (Janagaraj) when he goes to meet up with the singer. Vijay and Vetri thwart his plans, but Zinda still manages to escape. To avenge this, Zinda abducts both Vijay's and Vetri's wives and sends them a photographic evidence of the kidnap. Vetri and Vijay soon identify the location with the background signboard in the photo, rescue their wives, and arrest Zinda.

Awaiting Zinda's presence in the courtroom for his trial, they are surprised to see an unknown man being presented in the trial as Zinda. This makes them think that the DIG may be the spy who swapped Zinda out and rushes to his house to confront him, but finds him murdered in the arms of his crying wife. Suspicions still exist, and Vetri and Vijay find that the real spy is the DIG's wife, and they confront her. She shows them a lot of cash and asks them to let her go. Vijay sees this, and shoots and nearly kills Vetri for the money, and asks the wife to give him the money and leave. Believing that Vetri is finally dead, she rushes back to Zinda. But Vetri is alive, and this was a plan to make her lead them to Zinda's location. Vetri and Vijay follow her to a ship docked on the port, and go in to arrest Zinda. Zinda and his men are soon overpowered by the two-man fighting machine, but before he dies, he arms a bomb in the ship. Vetri and Vijay collaborate once and successfully disarm the bomb, thus relieving the port of the threat. The movie ends with both of them shaking hands.

== Cast ==
- Kamal Haasan as Vetrivel / Stephen Raj
- Prabhu as Vijay
- Khushbu as Jaya
- Sasikala as Shirley
- V. K. Ramasamy as Nallasivam
- Radha Ravi as Nithyanandam
- S. S. Chandran as Moorthi
- Salim Ghouse as Zinda
- Sudheer as Samuthiran
- Chinni Jayanth as Chinni
- Pradeep Shakthi as Victor
- Sowcar Janaki as Rani Sagayam
- Disco Shanti as Reena
- Thyagu as Thyagu
- Kullamani as Mani
- Mayilsamy as Mayilsamy
- LIC Narasimhan as Bank Manager S.Ganapathi
- Amala as Lalitha (Guest Appearance)
- Janagaraj as Baba Appaji (Guest Appearance)

== Production ==
It just so happened that I was reading [The Bourne Identity] at that time and it seemed terrific. It was basically Kalidasa's Shakuntala with lot more action.

— Prathap K. Pothen, on how Vettri Vizha developed

The film is Prathap K. Pothen's fifth directorial and third in Tamil after Meendum Oru Kaathal Kathai and Jeeva and was loosely inspired by the novel The Bourne Identity, written by Robert Ludlum in 1980. Bollywood actor Salim Ghouse made his Tamil debut with this film, portraying the antagonist. Prabhu's character was not present in the novel, and was created for the film. Prabhu Deva working as dance assistant to his father Sundaram Master choreographed a song "Thathom Thalangu" independently for Vettri Vizhaa.

== Soundtrack ==
This music was composed by Ilaiyaraaja. For the dubbed Telugu version Vijethalu, lyrics were written by Rajasri.

Tamil
No.	Title	Lyrics	Singer(s)	Length
1.	"Marugo Marugo"	Vaali	S. P. Balasubrahmanyam, K. S. Chithra	5:48
2.	"Seevi Sinukkeduthu"	Gangai Amaran	Malaysia Vasudevan, S. Janaki	4:30
3.	"Thathom Talangu"	Vaali	S. P. Balasubrahmanyam, S. Janaki	4:31
4.	"Poongatru Un Peru Solla"	Vaali	S. P. Balasubrahmanyam, K. S. Chithra	4:35
5.	"Vaanam Enna"	Vaali	S. P. Balasubrahmanyam, Malaysia Vasudevan	5:17
Total length:				24:41

Telugu
No.	Title	Singer(s)	Length
1.	"Edye Thullinadhi"	S. P. Balasubrahmanyam, S. Janaki	4:43
2.	"Marugo Marugo"	S. P. Balasubrahmanyam, K. S. Chithra	5:12
3.	"Ningi Choodu"	S. P. Balasubrahmanyam	5:07
4.	"Thathom Talangu"	S. P. Balasubrahmanyam, S. Janaki	4:27
5.	"Undali Nee Gundelo"	S. P. Balasubrahmanyam, S. Janaki	4:48
Total length:			24:18

== Release and reception ==
Vettri Vizhaa was released on 28 October 1989. The film ran for over 175 days in theatres. P. S. S. of Kalki praised Haasan's performance, Pratap Pothan's direction as jet speed, and Ashok Kumar's cinematography.

== Re-release ==
A digitally restored version of the film was released on 4 August 2017.
