= Kedar Nath Sahoo =

Founder director of the Government Chhau Dance Centre

- Born: Seraikella, Jharkhand, India
- Died: 8 October 2008; Kansari tola, Jharkahnd, India
- Occupation: Classical dancer
- Known for: Chhau dance
- Children: five sons and four daughters
- Awards: Padma Shri; Sangeet Natak Akademi Award

Kedar Nath Sahoo was an Indian classical dancer, known as one of the leading exponents of the Seraikella tradition of Chhau dance. (Note: Chhau dance is listed among UNESCO's Representative List of the Intangible Cultural Heritage of Humanity.) He served as the founder director of the Government Chhau Dance Centre (Chhau Nritya Kala Kendra) of the Government of Jharkhand where he served from 1974 to 1988. During the early stages of his career, he performed with the troupe led by Kumar Bijay Pratap Singh Deo, but later led his own group of dancers for performance in many places in India and abroad including Eastern Europe, South America and Southeast Asia. His students included many notable dancers like Sharon Lowen, Gopal Prasad Dubey and Shashadhar Acharya. He was a recipient of the 1981 Sangeet Natak Akademi Award and the Government of India awarded him the fourth highest civilian honour of the Padma Shri, in 2005, for his contributions to arts. Towards the latter part of his life, his health failed and he died on 8 October 2008 at his home in Kansari tola, aged 88. He was married, and had five sons and four daughters.

== See also ==
- Chhau dance
- Gopal Prasad Dubey
- Sharon Lowen
