= Agni Natchathiram =

1988 film by Mani Ratnam

- Theatrical release poster
- Directed by: Mani Ratnam
- Written by: Mani Ratnam
- Produced by: G. Venkateswaran
- Starring: Prabhu; Karthik; Amala; Nirosha
- Cinematography: P. C. Sreeram
- Edited by: B. Lenin; V. T. Vijayan
- Music by: Ilaiyaraaja
- Production company: Sujatha Productions
- Release date: 15 April 1988
- Running time: 155 minutes
- Country: India
- Language: Tamil

Agni Natchathiram (transl. Fire star) is a 1988 Indian Tamil-language masala film written and directed by Mani Ratnam. The film stars Prabhu, Karthik, Amala and newcomer Nirosha in the lead roles, with Vijayakumar, Jayachitra, Sumithra, Tara, S. N. Lakshmi and G. Umapathy in supporting roles. Its story revolves around two half-brothers who come into conflict with each other due to their claims for legitimacy as sons of a common father.

Ratnam intended Agni Natchathiram to follow Mouna Ragam (1986); he completed the script but chose to prioritise Nayakan. Although some scenes were filmed during a break from Nayakan, production on Agni Natchathiram stalled for nearly a year and resumed in late 1987 after Nayakan's release. Agni Natchathiram was produced by Ratnam's brother G. Venkateswaran; it was filmed by P. C. Sreeram, and edited by B. Lenin and V. T. Vijayan.

Agni Natchathiram was released on 15 April 1988, the week of the Tamil New Year festival Puthandu, and became a commercial success, running in theatres across Tamil Nadu for over 200 days. The film won two Filmfare Awards South, three Tamil Nadu State Film Awards, and five Cinema Express Awards. It became a trendsetter in Tamil cinema, set a new standard in the use of lighting, and was remade in Hindi as Vansh (1992).

== Plot ==
In Madras, half-brothers Gautham and Ashok harbor deep mutual animosity. Their father Vishwanath, a senior Indian Administrative Service (IAS) official, maintains two parallel households: Gautham is the son of his first wife, Susheela, while Ashok is the son of his second wife, Kamala. Gautham, a trainee Indian Police Service (IPS) officer, courts Anjali, the Police Commissioner's daughter, and the two fall in love. Upon graduating from the police academy, Gautham is posted as an Assistant Commissioner in Madras. Meanwhile, Ashok, who is unemployed and rebellious, falls in love with an anonymous woman. Concurrently, Vishwanath is appointed to chair a high-profile government inquiry commission investigating Chidambaram, a corrupt factory owner.

The underlying hostility between the brothers erupts one night when one of Ashok's friends taunts Gautham in public. Gautham abuses his police authority to apprehend Ashok and his friends on a fabricated charge. Although Susheela later helps Kamala secure Ashok's release, she delivers condescending, unsolicited advice about parenting, worsening the familial rift. Meanwhile, Chidambaram's attempts to bribe Vishwanath fail, prompting him to order the official's assassination.

Tensions peak on the day Kamala hosts a prospective groom's family for her daughter, Mallika. Vishwanath's absence causes the suitor's family to question his commitment to his second family. Outraged, Ashok goes to Vishwanath's primary residence to reprimand him, only to discover that Vishwanath was absent due to his mother's death. Gautham aggressively throws Ashok out of the house. A distraught Ashok confides in his girlfriend, who reveals that she also comes from a dysfunctional family. Elsewhere, the Police Commissioner discovers Gautham's romance with Anjali and, citing Vishwanath's bigamous history, disapproves of the relationship due to doubts over Gautham's capacity for monogamy.

The sibling dynamic shifts when Mallika encounters Gautham and Anjali on a commuter train. Gautham rescues her from hired ruffians deployed by Chidambaram to harass her, subsequently escorting her home alongside Anjali. When a grateful Mallika addresses Gautham as her brother, an unyielding Ashok arrives and aggressively throws him out. Following another altercation at a wedding and a massive public street brawl, a humiliated Vishwanath severely rebukes his sons for dragging their private family dysfunction into the public eye. Shortly after, Vishwanath is intentionally run down by a truck driven by Chidambaram's henchmen, leaving him critically injured.

The incident forces a truce, bringing both families closer as Kamala and Susheela maintain a joint vigil by Vishwanath's hospital bedside. Learning that Chidambaram has arranged a final assassination attempt before Vishwanath can submit his incriminating report the next day, the half-brothers unite. When Chidambaram's thugs infiltrate the hospital, Gautham and Ashok execute a coordinated counter-strategy, moving their father into an ambulance and successfully neutralizing the attackers. The following morning, the brothers safely escort the bandaged Vishwanath into the commission's headquarters to officially submit the evidence. Chidambaram is arrested, and the brothers reconcile.

== Cast ==
- Prabhu as Gautham Vishwanath
- Karthik as Ashok Vishwanath
- Amala as Anjali
- Nirosha as Ashok's girlfriend
- Vijayakumar as Vishwanath
- Veera Raghavan as the father of the groom-to-be for Mallika
- V. K. Ramasamy as Chettiar
- Janagaraj as Lakshmipathi
- Jayachitra as Kamala
- Sumithra as Susheela
- Tara as Mallika
- S. N. Lakshmi as Vishwanath's mother
- Disco Shanti as Anita the escort
- G. Umapathy as Chidambaram
- Prabhu Deva (special appearance in the song "Raaja Raajathi")

== Production ==
=== Development ===
After Mouna Ragam (1986), Mani Ratnam wrote the script for Agni Natchathiram, with which he intended to reach out to audiences he could not reach with Mouna Ragam. However, when Muktha Srinivasan approached Ratnam to make a film for Kamal Haasan, which eventually became Nayakan, he agreed, putting Agni Natchathiram on hold. The film was produced by Ratnam's brother G. Venkateswaran, filmed by P. C. Sreeram, and edited by B. Lenin and V. T. Vijayan. Thota Tharani was the art director and Mugur Sundar was the dance choreographer.

=== Casting and filming ===
It's the onset of agni natchatiram [the height of summer]. It stars slowly and reaches a peak with the sun, and then it cools down. The visual seems very simple because it's just the sun coming out, but we actually had to time it and measure the length of the shot. We went one day, P.C. Sreeram and I, with a stopwatch. Unlike now, when we ramp the shot to the length we need, we had to shoot it to the length that we required, and we had to ensure that the start-to-finish had that escalation.

— Mani Ratnam on the opening sunrise, 2012

Agni Natchathiram is the second time after Mouna Ragam Karthik collaborated with Ratnam. It is the feature-film debut of Radikaa's sister Nirosha, who was not initially interested in pursuing an acting career, having previously declined an offer to act in Nayakan, but at Radikaa's suggestion she joined this film. Vijayakumar, who had quit films and had settled in the United States, had returned to India for a different purpose when assistant director K. Subash met and offered him a role in Agni Natchathiram. Vijayakumar initially refused but Subash remained adamant; when Ratnam narrated the script, Vijayakumar was impressed with the character and accepted the role. G. Umapathy made his acting debut, playing the antagonist Chidambaram.

In January 1987, after two weeks of filming for Nayakan, Ratnam resumed work on Agni Natchathiram, filming scenes with Prabhu and Amala such as the song "Ninnukkori Varnam". Ratnam, however, could not manage filming for two films at the same time so work on Agni Natchathiram was halted for nearly a year, resuming only after Nayakan's release in late 1987. To make the film more commercially viable, a comedy subplot involving a middle-aged man (V. K. Ramasamy) and his chauffeur (Janagaraj) trying to cavort with an escort (Disco Shanti) without their wives' knowledge was created. Two backup dancers did not arrive for the filming of the dance song "Raaja Raajathi", so Sundar persuaded his son Prabhu Deva to perform the breakdance in the song. Some scenes were shot at the Southern Railway Headquarters. The entire climax was filmed with strobe light effects.

== Soundtrack ==
Ilaiyaraaja composed the soundtrack of Agni Natchathiram and Vaali wrote the lyrics. For the Telugu dubbed version titled Gharshana, all the lyrics are written by Rajasri.

== Release ==
Agni Natchathiram was released on 15 April 1988, the week of Puthandu, the Tamil New Year festival. It ran in theatres for over 200 days, becoming a silver jubilee film and Ratnam's most-profitable film to that point based on return on investment. The film was also dubbed in Telugu as Gharshana.

=== Critical reception ===
S. Shivakumar, writing for Mid-Day, called Agni Natchathiram "Mani's [most] loosely scripted work to date" and said; "What emerges on the screen is frothy and cracks like fresh pop corn". N. Krishnaswamy of The Indian Express wrote the film has "more light than heat", referring to the impact Sriram's technique had on the film, and criticised the comedy subplot. Ananda Vikatan wrote Ratnam proved he could make an interesting and engaging film with just a small thread of script, and that he had imagined each scene differently and presented them interestingly, giving the film a rating of 45 out of 100. Jayamanmadhan of Kalki criticised the film for Ratnam's direction and writing.

=== Accolades ===
Event	Award	Recipient	Ref.
36th Filmfare Awards South	Best Film – Tamil	G. Venkateswaran	
36th Filmfare Awards South	Best Actor – Tamil	Karthik	
Tamil Nadu State Film Awards	Best Film	G. Venkateswaran	
Tamil Nadu State Film Awards	Special Prize for Best Actor	Karthik	
Tamil Nadu State Film Awards	Best Female Playback Singer	K. S. Chithra	
9th Cinema Express Awards	Best Film – Tamil	G. Venkateswaran	
9th Cinema Express Awards	Best Director (Special Award)	Mani Ratnam	
9th Cinema Express Awards	Best Actress (Special Award)	Amala (Note: For Illam as well.)	
9th Cinema Express Awards	Best New Face	Nirosha (Note: For Senthoora Poove as well.)	
9th Cinema Express Awards	Best Music Director	Ilaiyaraaja (Note: For Soora Samhaaram and Dharmathin Thalaivan as well.)	

== Legacy ==
Indian film critic Baradwaj Rangan considers Agni Natchathiram a defining Tamil film for the youth of the 1980s. It became a trendsetter in Tamil cinema for setting "a new standard in the use of lighting". Lakshmipathi's dialogue "En pondatti oorrukku poyiruchu" ("My wife has gone to her town"), often misquoted as "En pondatti oorukku poittaa", which is spoken in excitement when his wife leaves for her hometown, entered Tamil vernacular. The misquotation also inspired a song of the same name in Nenjam Marappathillai (2021). In 2004, Rediff.com appreciated Agni Natchathiram for its "[s]ubtlety, diffused lighting, realistic fights, plain logic, a controlled Prabhu and a livewire Kartik", calling it a "landmark movie which never got the recognition it deserved up north". In 2018, Rangan called Agni Natchathiram one of the best films in the masala genre, though he noted elements such as the loosu ponnu character played by Amala and the "flashy, MTV-era cinematography" did not age well. The film was remade in Hindi as Vansh (1992).

== Bibliography ==
- Dhananjayan, G. (2011). The Best of Tamil Cinema, 1931 to 2010: 1977–2010. Galatta Media. OCLC 733724281.
- Ramachandran, Naman (2014) [2012]. Rajinikanth: The Definitive Biography. New Delhi: Penguin Books. ISBN 978-0-14-342111-5.
- Rangan, Baradwaj (2012). Conversations with Mani Ratnam. India: Penguin Books. ISBN 978-0-670-08520-0.
