= Gopal Prasad Dubey =

Indian classical dancer (1957–2022)

- Born: 25 June 1957; Seraikella, Bihar (now in Jharkhand), India
- Died: November 14, 2022 (aged 65)
- Occupation: Classical dancer
- Years active: Since 1971
- Spouse: Nalini gopal
- Children: 2
- Awards: Padma Shri Sangeet Natak Akademi Award 2016 Lifetime achievement award 2017 from CMSB New Delhi Vocational Achievement Award; Jharkhand State Award; Suvarna Shankhu Award; Natya Shri Puraskar; Golden Conch Award; Natya Tarang Puraskar; Natya Keerthi Shikha Puraskar; Natya Veda Puraskar
- Website: Official web site

Gopal Prasad Dubey (25 June 1957 – 14 November 2022) is an Indian classical dancer, known for his expertise in the Indian classical dance form of Chhau. He is considered by many as the leading exponent of the Seraikella variant of the art form. Dubey was honored by the Government of India, in 2012, with the fourth highest Indian civilian award of Padma Shri.

== Biography ==
Gopal Prasad Dubey was born on 25 June 1957 in a Brahmin family at Seraikella, in the Indian state of Bihar (now Jharkhand). He started training Chhau at the age of 14 under renowned gurus such as Rajkumar S. N. Singhdeo, Kedar Nath Sahoo, both Padma Shri award winners and Natasekhar Banbihari Pattanayak. He also had training in New York, under a grant provided by the Asian Cultural Council.

Dubey founded Trinetra, an institution for promoting Chhau dance, in 1985, under the aegis of which he has performed at many places across the world. He has worked as the faculty member for dance at the Panjab University, Chandigarh. He has also worked with many international universities such as the University of Kansas, Indiana University of Pennsylvania, Harvard University, University of London, Chungang University, Seoul, Seoul Institute of the Arts and American College of Greece and has taught at the Theatre Group and Multi Cultural Centre, both based in Inchon, South Korea.

Dubey presented two classic plays, Antigone, in 1984 in New York and Shakuntalam, in 1987 at the Volos Theatre in Greece. His compositions were included in Bharat Ek Khoj, a TV series produced by the renowned film makerShyam Benegal. He is also credited with the choreography of productions and presentations such as:

- Uttar Ramayan, (1997) TV series produced by Ramanand Sagar
- Jeevan Rekha, (1990) Doordarshan dance ballet by Sharon Lowen
- Death Watch, play written by Jean Genet and directed by Kumara Varma
- Andhayug, Panjab University production, based on Mahabharata
- Mrignayanee, TV series directed by Amol Palekar
- The Golden Leaves, Korean play directed by Lee Sung Kyu
- Mud Man, Korean play directed by Jang Jin Ho
- Last Vision, (2009) NFDC produced feature film directed by A. K. Bir
- Dance of the Warriors, (1996) a collaborative production with Henry Clay Smith of Solaris Dance Theatre, New York
- Mask of the Warriors, (1997) another Henry Clay Smith collaboration
- Pillars Of the Community, (2009) play in English, directed by Neeraj Kabi

An approved artist of the Indian Council for Cultural Relations, a Government of India agency, Gopal Prasad Dubey has travelled in many parts of the world with his performance, which includes a performance at Symphony Space, Broadway, New York and has conducted many workshops and demonstrations in India and abroad. He has also collaborated with mainstream cinema and experimental theatre.

Gopal Prasad Dubey lives in Bengaluru, Karnataka.

== Awards and recognitions ==
Gopal Prasad Dubey is a recipient of the Vocational Achievement Award from Rotary Club International. He received the Jharkhand State Award in 2007 for his contributions in promoting Chhau dance. He was awarded Suvarna Shankhu at the Keli Chhau festival in 2010. The same year, he received the Natya Shri title from Nataraj Music Academy and Golden Conch from Keli Foundation, Mumbai.

Holder of a senior fellowship from the Ministry of Culture, Dubey was honored by the Government of India in 2012, with the fourth highest civilian award of Padma Shri. He also received Natya Tarang Puraskar from Nataraj Music Academy and Natya Keerthi Shikha Puraskar from Sathyanjali Academy, Cochin, both in 2013 and Natya Veda Puraskar from Nataraj Music Academy in 2014.

== See also ==
- Chhau dance
- Indian classical dance
- List of Indian dances
