= Sanmanassullavarkku Samadhanam =

- Poster
- Directed by: Sathyan Anthikkad
- Screenplay by: Sreenivasan
- Story by: Sathyan Anthikkad
- Produced by: Siyad Koker
- Starring: Mohanlal; Karthika; Sreenivasan
- Cinematography: Vipin Mohan
- Edited by: K. Rajagopal
- Music by: Jerry Amaldev; Shyam (score)
- Production company: Kokers Films
- Distributed by: Central Pictures
- Release date: 31 October 1986
- Country: India
- Language: Malayalam

Sanmanassullavarkku Samadhanam (transl. Peace for those good graced) is a 1986 Indian Malayalam-language comedy-drama film directed by Sathyan Anthikkad and written by Sreenivasan from a story by Anthikkad. The film stars Mohanlal, Karthika, Sreenivasan and M. G. Soman. The film features songs composed by Jerry Amaldev and background score by Shyam. The film was released on October 31, 1986 during Diwali.

The film was a commercial success at the box office. It was remade by I. V. Sasi in Tamil as Illam (1988), in Telugu as Donga Kollu (1988), in Hindi by Priyadarshan as Yeh Teraa Ghar Yeh Meraa Ghar (2001) and twice in Kannada as Yardo Duddu Yellammana Jatre (2003) and Ananda Nilaya (2003).

Mohanlal won his 1st Filmfare Award for Best Actor – Malayalam.

== Plot ==
The story revolves around a short tempered and domineering house owner, Gopalakrishna Panikkar, who is struggling with debt incurred during the wedding of his two sisters. He needs to force his tenants to vacate so that the house can be sold and the debt repaid. The tenants do not want to leave for reasons of their own.

The only way Gopalakrishnan can escape from certain bankruptcy is to sell the property he owns in the city and use the proceeds to settle his debts. To do that, he has to evict his tenants from there first. Unfortunately for him, his tenant is the feisty Meera and her family, who absolutely refuses to vacate the house. Gopalakrishnan uses an obscure clause in the contract to take up residence at the house, and tries his best to smoke his tenants out and takes help of his friend, Sub-Inspector Rajendran (Sreenivasan) to evict them. But Rajendran falls in love with Meera and refuses to evict her. Things get worse for Gopalakrishnan as Meera’s elderly uncle Damodaran plots to kick him out with the help of a goon but Gopalakrishnan beats the goon up and chases Damodaran away.

Gopalakrishnan plans on Rajendran to marry Meera in order to evict her with her family, but fails when it is revealed by Meera's mother that she was a mental patient due to the death of her father. Much hilarity ensues later and Meera at last, on knowing about the extent of Gopalakrishnan's problems, vacates the house without reservations and leaves. But Gopalakrishnan calls her back and decides that this will be their house.

== Cast ==
- Mohanlal as Gopalakrishna Panikkar, the film protagonist and short tempered house owner
- Karthika as Meera, the feisty daughter
- Sreenivasan as Sub-Inspector K. Rajendran
- K. P. A. C. Lalitha as Karthyayani
- Mammukoya as Ummer
- Thilakan as Damodar Ji
- Innocent as Kunji Kannan Nair
- Sankaradi as Adv. P. Sreedharan Nair
- Sukumari as Panikkar's mother
- Thodupuzha Vasanthi as Ayisha
- Yadu Krishnan as Monukuttan, Meera's brother
- Sumitha Rahim as Deepa, Meera's sister
- M. G. Soman as Rajendran's uncle / Poomkinavu Ammavan

== Production ==
The film was shot in and around a house named "Chakyathu" situated near Mahatma Gandhi Road in Kochi, Kerala. Most of the story revolves around the house. The filming in the house was completed in 27 days. After the success of Sanmanassullavarkku Samadhanam, the house has become a location for many films.

== Soundtrack ==
The music was composed by Jerry Amaldev and the lyrics were written by Mullanezhi. Shyam composed the film score.

No.	Song	Singers	Lyrics	Length
1	"Kanninu Ponkani"	K. J. Yesudas	Mullanezhi	
2	"Pavizhamalli Poothulanja"	K. J. Yesudas	Mullanezhi	

== Reception and remakes ==
The film was a critical and commercial success. It was later remade in Telugu as Donga Kollu (1988) with Rajendra Prasad and Sumalatha, in Tamil as Illam (1988) with Sivakumar and Amala, in Hindi as Yeh Teraa Ghar Yeh Meraa Ghar (2001) directed by Priyadarshan and starring Sunil Shetty in the lead role and in Kannada as Yardo Duddu Yellammana Jatre (2003) with Jaggesh and once again in Kannada as Ananda Nilaya (2003).
