= 9th Cinema Express Awards =

1989 Indian film awards ceremony

- Date: 1989

Highlights
- Best Picture: Agni Natchathiram

On 9 March 1989, Cinema Express magazine editor V. Ramamurthy announced the best of South Indian films for the year of 1988, selected by the readers of the magazine. G. Lakshma Reddy, sales manager of Dyanora Television, co-sponsor also announced the Dyanora Gold cine awards for excellence in film industry.

Only four category of awards are selected for the languages Malayalam, Kannada and Telugu.

== Tamil ==
Category	Winner	Film
Best film	G. Venkateswaran	Agni Natchathiram
Best director	Balu Mahendra	Veedu
Best director (Special award)	Mani Ratnam	Agni Natchathiram
Best new face (director)	R. V. Udayakumar	Urimai Geetham & Puthiya Vaanam
Best actor	Prabhu	Manasukkul Mathappu
Best actress	Radhika	Paasa Paravaigal & Poonthotta Kaavalkaaran
Best actress (Special award)	Amala	Illam & Agni Natchathiram
Best character actor	Vijayakanth	Poonthotta Kaavalkaaran & Senthoora Poove
Best new face (actor)	Livingston	Poonthotta Kaavalkaaran
Best new face (actress)	Nirosha	Agni Natchathiram & Senthoora Poove
Best villain actor	Kitty	Sathyaa
Best comedy actor	S. S. Chandran	Vasanthi
Best comedy actress	Manorama	Paatti Sollai Thattathe
Best child artist	Master Silambarasan	En Thangai Kalyani
Best cameraman	M.M.Rengaswamy	Senthoora Poove
Best music	Ilaiyaraaja	Soora Samhaaram, Agni Natchathiram & Dharmathin Thalaivan
Best male playback singer	S. P. Balasubrahmanyam	Unnal Mudiyum Thambi (Song: )
Best female playback singer	P. Susheela	Raasave Unnai Nambi (Song:Raasathi Manasule ...)

== Telugu ==
Category	Winner	Film
Best film	Ch.V. Appa Rao	Swarnakamalam
Best director	K. Viswanath	Swarnakamalam
Best actor	Chiranjeevi	Swayamkrushi
Best actress	Bhanupriya	Swarnakamalam

== Kannada ==
Category	Winner	Film
Best film	Prabha Raj	Suprabhatha
Best director	V. Ravichandran	Ranadheera
Best actor	Vishnuvardhan	Suprabhatha
Best actress	Suhasini	Suprabhatha

== Malayalam ==
Category	Winner	Film
Best film	Atlas Ramachandran	Vaisali
Best director	I. V. Sasi	1921
Best actor	Mammootty	Oru CBI Diary Kurippu
Best actress	Geetha	Vaisali

== Dyanora Gold cine awards ==
Winner	Contribution
Nageswara Rao Akkineni	Contribution to south Indian cinema
Rajinikanth	For acting in the English film Bloodstone
Nagesh	Dedicated service to Tamil cinema
Anjali Devi	The most talented artiste in all south Indian language films
