= Kavadi Sindhu =

- Directed by: K. Bhagyaraj
- Written by: K. Bhagyaraj
- Produced by: Muktha Srinivasan
- Starring: K. Bhagyaraj; Amala
- Cinematography: K. Rajpreeth
- Music by: K. Bhagyaraj
- Production companies: Muktha Films; Kunjappan Pictures
- Country: India
- Language: Tamil

Kavadi Sindhu is an unfinished Indian Tamil-language film written and directed by K. Bhagyaraj. The film stars Bhagyaraj himself and Amala in lead roles. It was jointly produced by Muktha Films and Kunjappan Pictures. Bhagyaraj also composed the film's soundtrack. The film which was made in 1986 got shelved midway despite the release of the soundtrack.

== Cast ==
- K. Bhagyaraj
- Amala

== Production ==
It was announced in July 1985 that Bhagyaraj would act and direct a film for Muktha Films, which later became Kavadi Sindhu. In September 1986, media reported that the song "Yaaro Sonnanga" was shot at Palani in places such as Savarikkadu, Kodai House, Palar Dam while the song "Jaamakozhi" was shot in a set with huts at Sathya Studios.

== Soundtrack ==
The soundtrack was composed by Bhagyaraj. The songs "Yaaro Sonnanga", "Jaamakozhi" and "Enna Kurai" became popular during release. Bhagyaraj choose to compose music for the film himself due to a misunderstanding with composer Ilaiyaraaja.

Song	Singers	Lyrics
"Sangeetham Enakku"	S. P. Balasubrahmanyam	Vaali
"Yaaro Sonnanga"	S. P. Balasubrahmanyam, S. Janaki	Vaali
"Enna Kurai Rasave"	S. P. Balasubrahmanyam, K. S. Chithra	Vaali
"En Jodikili"	S. P. Balasubrahmanyam, S. Janaki	Muthulingam
"Vilakku Ethathum"	S. P. Balasubrahmanyam, S. Janaki	Chinnakonar
"Jaamakozhi"	P. Jayachandran, S. Janaki	Vaali
"Oru Poo Poothada"	S. P. Balasubrahmanyam, S. Janaki	Vaali
"Oru Ettu Mozha"	S. Janaki	Vaali
"Vethala Kaadu"	Jayachandran, Chithra	Vaali
"Maamov Adikkadi"	S. P. Balasubrahmanyam, Chithra	Vaali

== Legacy ==
Despite the release of the soundtrack, the film was shelved midway and never completed. However the songs "Ettumozham" ("Oru Ettu Mozha") and "Saamakozhi" ("Jaamakozhi") from this film were later reused in a film called Pattanamthan Pogalamadi (1990) as mentioned in thanks card. The song "Ennanavo Ketkum Vayasu" sung by S. P. Balasubrahmanyam and S. Janaki is also credited in the thanks card to be from this film; however, the song is absent from the soundtrack. The footage of "Saamakozhi" picturised on Bhagyaraj and Amala was added in the film during the scene where Radikaa and Rupini visit a theatre to watch a film while the rest of the songs from Kavadi Sindhu were picturised with the star cast of this film consisting of Rahman, Radikaa, Nizhalgal Ravi and Rupini.
