= Pratap Pothen =

Indian actor and filmmaker (1952–2022)

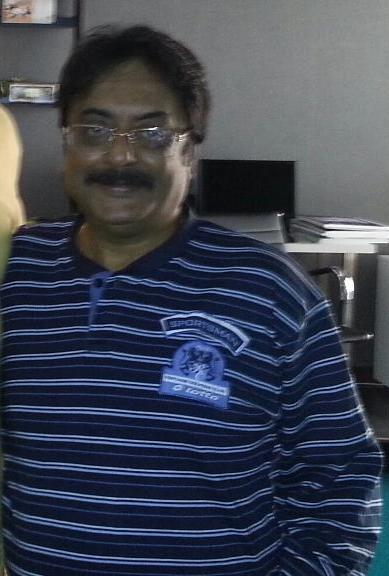
- Born: 13 August 1952; Trivandrum, Travancore–Cochin (present day Thiruvananthapuram, Kerala), India
- Died: 15 July 2022 (aged 69); Chennai, Tamil Nadu, India
- Education: Madras Christian College
- Occupations: Actor; film producer; scriptwriter; director; filmmaker
- Years active: 1978–1995, 2005–2022
- Spouses: Radhika Sarathkumar (m. 1985; div. 1986) Amala Satyanath (m. 1990)
- Children: 1

Pratap Pothen (13 August 1952 – 15 July 2022) was an Indian actor and filmmaker who acted in about 100 films and directed 12 films. He worked predominantly in Tamil, Malayalam and Telugu films. He also worked as a scriptwriter and producer for films.

== Early life and career ==
Pratap was born in Thiruvananthapuram, Kerala on 13 August 1952. His father was Pothan of the Kolathinkal house, a businessman who died in 1967, when Pratap was 15 years old. Pratap had five siblings, including an elder brother, Hari Pothan, who also worked as a film producer.

Pratap was educated at the Lawrence School, Lovedale in Ooty. Initially, he was interested in painting; however, once he joined college, he started acting in plays with the help of his friends, and gradually got more interested in acting than painting. After his graduation from the Madras Christian College, Pratap worked as a copywriter for an ad agency in Mumbai. Later he also worked at Sistas ad agency and Hindustan Thomson.

== Personal life ==
Pratap married actress Radhika in 1985, but their marriage did not last long and they separated in 1986. In 1990, he married Amala Sathyanath, with whom he had a daughter named Keya.

== Film career ==
Pratap worked with The Madras Players. After seeing Pratap's performance in Shaw's play Androcles and the Lion, Bharathan invited Pratap to appear in his Malayalam film Aaravam.

Pratap later starred in three more films: Thakara, Lorry and Chamaram.

He also acted in Tamil films such as Moodupani, Varumayin Niram Sivappu, Nenjathai Killathe, Panneer Pushpangal. His debut as a director was in Meendum Oru Kaathal Kathai, which he received a national award for. Pratap worked with Kamal Haasan in Vettri Vizhaa (1989). The film is noteworthy for being the first Tamil movie to use a steadicam.

Pratap created three more films in Malayalam Rithubhedam, Daisy, Oru Yathramozhi. His only Telugu film is Chaitanya and his only role in Bollywood is in Guru. His notable roles in Malayalam cinema include Once Upon A Time There Was A Kallan, Ayalum Njanum Thammil, 22 Female Kottayam, Idukki Gold, Ezra, Uyare, and Bangalore Days.

He directed Tamil films including Jeeva, Vettri Vizhaa, Seevalaperi Pandi and Lucky Man.

In 2006, Pratap Pothan announced that he would direct Madhavan in a script written by K. Rajeswar. Pre-production works proved to be difficult and the film went through several changes of title and lead actress, before it was announced that the film would be called Oru Naal Podhuma and would feature Rukmini Vijayakumar in the leading female role. The team had made plans to complete shooting for the film in Canada, though creative differences meant that the film was subsequently shelved.

In the last few years, he was busy with his ad agency "Green Apple" and focused on commercials for MRF Tyres and Nippo. He used to host Naalaya Iyakkunar on Kalaignar TV.

The turn of the century saw him playing many gratifying roles in films like Priyasakhi, Aayirathil Oruvan and Ponmagal Vandhal. As a filmmaker, in Tamil, Telugu and Malayalam, he directed veterans like Sivaji Ganesan, Mohanlal, Kamal Haasan, Thilakan and Nagarjuna.

== Death ==
Pratap was found dead in his apartment in Kilpauk, Chennai on 15 July 2022. He is believed to have died of natural causes.

== Awards and nominations ==
Award	Year	Category	Film	Result	Ref.
National Film Awards	1984	Best Debut Film of a Director	Meendum Oru Kaathal Kathai	Won	
Kerala State Film Awards	2014	Special Jury Award for acting	Once upon a Time There was a Kallan	Won	
Filmfare Awards South	1979	Best Actor (Malayalam)	Thakara	Won	
Filmfare Awards South	1979	Best Actor (Tamil)	Azhiyatha Kolangal	Nominated	
Filmfare Awards South	1980	Best Actor (Malayalam)	Chamaram	Won	
Filmfare Awards South	1980	Best Actor (Tamil)	Nenjathai Killathe	Nominated	
Filmfare Awards South	1987	Best Director (Malayalam)	Rithubhedam	Won	
Filmfare Awards South	2012	Best Supporting Actor (Malayalam)	Ayalum Njanum Thammil	Nominated	
South Indian International Movie Awards	2012	Best Actor in a Negative Role (Malayalam)	22 Female Kottayam	Won	
South Indian International Movie Awards	2012	Best Actor in a Supporting Role (Malayalam)	Ayalum Njanum Thammil	Nominated	
Asianet Film Awards	2013	Special Jury Mention for acting	Idukki Gold; 3 Dots	Won	
Vanitha Film Awards	2012	Best Supporting Actor	Ayalum Njanum Thammil	Won	

== Filmography ==
Order based on number of films that he acted in.

=== As an actor ===
==== Tamil films ====
Year	Film	Role	Notes
1979	Azhiyatha Kolangal	Indumathi's husband	Filmfare Award for Best Actor – Tamil
1980	Ilamai Kolam	Ilangovan	
1980	Moodu Pani	Chandru	
1980	Varumayin Niram Sivappu	Prathap	
1980	Nenjathai Killathe	Prathap	Filmfare Award for Best Actor – Tamil
1981	Karaiyellam Shenbagapoo	C. Kalyana Raman	
1981	Madhu Malar	Madhu	
1981	Kudumbam Oru Kadambam	Kannan	
1981	Panneer Pushpangal	Prem	
1981	Sollathe Yarum Kettaal		
1981	Nenjil Oru Mull	Prathap	
1981	Vaa Intha Pakkam		
1981	Thillu Mullu	Himself	Cameo appearance
1981	Rani		
1981	Panimalar		
1982	Vaazhvey Maayam	Prathap	
1982	Amma		
1982	Echchil Iravugal		
1982	Oru Varisu Uruvagiradhu		
1982	Sattam Sirikkiradhu	Raj	
1982	Eera Vizhi Kaaviyangal		
1982	Nandri, Meendum Varuga	Prathap	
1983	Yudhakaandam		
1984	Pudhumai Penn	Advocate David	
1984	Meendum Oru Kaathal Kathai	Ganapathi "Guppi"	Also director
1985	Sindhu Bhairavi	Sanjeevi	
1987	Manaivi Ready	Doctor	
1987	Jallikattu		Guest appearance
1988	En Jeevan Paduthu	Dr. Vijay	
1988	Penmani Aval Kanmani	Parandhaman	
1988	Raththa Dhanam		
1988	Jeeva	Magician in song "Abracadabra"	Cameo appearance
1988	Ithuthan Arambam		
1990	Sirayil Sila Raagangal	Pratap	
1992	Amaran	Raja Varma	
1997	Thedinen Vanthathu	Vicky	
2005	Priyasakhi	Priya's father	
2005	Raam	Psychiatrist	
2008	Velli Thirai	Himself	Cameo appearance
2009	Padikathavan	Ramakrishnan	
2009	Sarvam	Psychiatrist	Cameo appearance
2010	Aayirathil Oruvan	Chandramouli	
2010	Veerasekaran		
2011	Muran		Cameo appearance
2012	Suzhal	Daniel Mathews	
2013	Alex Pandian	Radhakrishnan	
2014	Poojai	Divya's Father	
2016	Remo	Dr. Ravichandran	
2017	Sathura Adi 3500	Fahad	
2017	Yaar Ivan	Dr. Xavier D'Souza	
2019	Kolaiyuthir Kaalam	Business manager	
2020	Ponmagal Vandhal	Judge	
2021	Kamali From Nadukkaveri	Arivudainambi	
2021	Tughlaq Durbar	Doctor	Cameo appearance
2022	Coffee with Kadhal	Ravi, Saravanan, Varshini and Kathir's father	Posthumous release
2022	Yugi	Purushothaman	Posthumous release
2024	Ippadiku Kadhal		Posthumous release
2025	Gajaana		Posthumous release

==== Malayalam films ====
Year	Film	Role	Notes
1978	Aaravam	Kokkarakko	
1979	Thakara	Thakara	Filmfare Award for Best Actor – Malayalam
1980	Aarohanam	Raju	
1980	Pavizha Mutthu	Santhosh	
1980	Chandra Bimbam	Gopi	
1980	Thaliritta Kinakkal		
1980	Lorry	Dasappan	
1980	Chamaram	Vinod	Filmfare Award for Best Actor – Malayalam
1980	Oormakale Vida Tharu		
1980	Pappu	Pappu	
1981	Aparna		
1982	Sindoora Sandhyakku Mounam	Anil-Raju	
1982	Idavela		
1982	Preeyasakhi Radha		
1982	Novemberinte Nashtam	Das	
1983	America America	Baby	
1983	Kaikeyi		
1984	Aksharangal		
1986	Onnu Muthal Poojyam Vare	Josekutty	
1987	Nirabhedangal	Jayadevan	
2005	Thanmathra	Doctor	
2009	Calendar	Cleetus	
2010	Pulliman		
2012	22 Female Kottayam	Hegde	SIIMA Award for Best Actor in a Negative Role
2012	Ayalum Njanum Thammil	Dr.Samuel	Filmfare Award for Best Supporting Actor – Malayalam
2013	3 Dots	Padmakumar/Pappettan	
2013	Aaru Sundarimaarude Katha	Alex Paul	
2013	Up & Down - Mukalil Oralundu	Edathil Govindan Nair	
2013	Arikil Oraal	Sudhir Bose	
2013	Idukki Gold	Michael	
2014	London Bridge	C S Nambiar	
2014	Bangalore Days	Francis	
2014	Alice: A True Story	Dr. Sivapanchanathan	
2014	Munnariyippu	KK	
2014	Vegam	Benny	
2014	Once Upon A Time There Was A Kallan		
2015	Mariyam Mukku	Father Gabriel	
2015	Appavum Veenjum	Fernandez	
2015	Kanal	Raghu	
2017	Ezra	Col.Nambiar	
2019	Uyare	Senior Air Traffic Controller	
2020	Pachamanga		
2020	Forensic	Dr. Jayakumar Menon	
2022	CBI 5: The Brain	Dr. George Abraham	
2022	Adrishyam	Purushothaman	Posthumous release
2024	Her	Vijayakumar	Posthumous release

==== Telugu films ====
Year	Film	Role	Notes
1981	Aakali Rajyam	Pratap	
1984	Kanchana Ganga	Mohan	
1984	Justice Chakravarthy	Pratap	
2006	Chukkallo Chandrudu	Prakash	
2010	Maro Charitra	Balu's father	
2015	Yevade Subramanyam	Butterfly Park Worker	
2017	Veedevadu	Dr. Xavier D'Souza	
2023	Grey: The Spy Who Loved Me	Sudarshan Reddy	Posthumous release

==== Other language films ====
Year	Film	Role	Language	Notes
1987	Pushpaka Vimana		Sound	
2007	Guru	K. R. Menon I.A.S.	Hindi	

=== As director ===
Year	Film	Language	Notes
1985	Meendum Oru Kaathal Kathai	Tamil	Also actor, producer and writer Indira Gandhi Award for Best Debut Film of a Director
1987	Rithubhedam	Malayalam	Filmfare Award for Best Director – Malayalam
1988	Daisy	Malayalam	Also writer
1988	Jeeva	Tamil	Also writer
1989	Vetri Vizha	Tamil	Also writer
1990	My Dear Marthandan	Tamil	Also writer
1991	Chaitanya	Telugu	Also writer
1992	Magudam	Tamil	Also writer
1993	Athma	Tamil	Also writer
1994	Seevalaperi Pandi	Tamil	
1995	Lucky Man	Tamil	Also writer
1997	Oru Yathramozhi	Malayalam	

=== As writer ===
- Solla Thudikuthu Manasu (1988) (Tamil)

=== Television ===
- Naalaya Iyakkunar (2019) (Kalaignar TV) (Tamil)
