= Magudam (1992 film) =

- Poster
- Directed by: Pratap Pothen
- Written by: Shanmuga Priyan; Pratap Pothen
- Produced by: K. Balu
- Starring: Sathyaraj; Bhanupriya; Gautami
- Cinematography: Ashok Kumar
- Edited by: B. Lenin; V. T. Vijayan
- Music by: Ilaiyaraaja
- Production company: K. B. Films
- Release date: 24 July 1992
- Country: India
- Language: Tamil

Magudam (transl. Crown) is a 1992 Indian Tamil language action drama film written and directed by Pratap Pothen. The film stars Sathyaraj, Bhanupriya and Gautami. It was released on 24 July 1992.

== Plot ==
Muthuvelu was brought up by his grandmother, who does not permit him to talk to girls. One night, Muthu meets Thilakavathi and becomes scared, thinking she is a ghost because she was wearing a white dress. Then he realizes she is a human. When Thilaka tries to drink poison, he stops her and asks her why she is doing this. Thilaka says that she was a medical student, and her chief asked her to conduct a postmortem on a woman. Thilaka was coerced into reporting that it was a case of suicide, but she conclusively proved that the woman was killed and that it was done by Thilaka's husband Thillainathan. For this, Thillainathan spoiled Thilaka's name, killed her mother, and tried to kill her also. She did not want to die at their hands, so she decided to commit suicide.

Muthu wants to help Thilaka. Soon after, they fall in love. He also convinces his grandmother, who says that Thilaka should continue her studies, for which Muthu will help. Later, Muthu was arrested by the police and framed by Thillainathan. In that period, he loses his land to Thillainathan. When he returns from jail, he plans to take revenge on Thillainathan. He forms a gang and becomes a local rowdy. Meanwhile, Thilaka becomes a doctor.

Enters Bhavani, a mischievous girl who falls in love with Muthu and tries to persuade him to marry her. Meanwhile, Thillainathan tries to kill Muthu by shooting him. Bhavani saves him but gets shot. At the hospital, the doctor says that Bhavani is going to die and asks her brother to fulfill her last wish. Bhavani says that she wants to die as Muthu's wife, and Muthu marries Bhavani. Unfortunately, Thilaka saves Bhavani and becomes devastated knowing that Muthu was Bhavani's husband. She stops her marriage, and his grandmother also hates Muthu without knowing about his marriage, and goes with Thilaka. Thilaka maintains a good friendship with Bhavani and solves her family problems. Thillainathan tries to kill Muthu in many ways, while Bhavani gives birth to a child.

Finally, Thillainathan kidnaps Muthu's child, grandmother, Bhavani, and Thilaka. Muthu and Bhavani's brother comes to rescue them. In this process, Bhavani is shot by Thillainathan, whose last words are that Muthu should marry Thilaka and that Thilaka should be the mother of her baby. Then she pushes Thillainathan from a rock, and both fall and die. Muthu marries Thilaka.

== Cast ==
- Sathyaraj as Muthuvelu
- Bhanupriya as Bhavani
- Gautami as Dr. Thilakavathi
- Manorama as Muthuvelu's grandmother
- Charan Raj as Harold, Bhavani's brother
- Salim Ghouse as Thilainathan
- Goundamani as Thanisami
- Senthil as Manasthan
- Mansoor Ali Khan as Thillainathan's brother
- Alagumani as Manasthan's sister (uncredited)
- Sridevi as herself (photographic appearance only)

== Soundtrack ==
The soundtrack was composed by Ilaiyaraaja, with lyrics by Vaali.

Track listing
No.	Title	Singer(s)	Length
1.	"Chinna Kanna"	S. P. Balasubrahmanyam, S. Janaki	4:57
2.	"Sivappana Chinna Pappa"	S. P. Balasubrahmanyam, S. Janaki	4:45
3.	"Indha Mamavukku"	K. S. Chithra, Swarnalatha, Uma Ramanan	5:01
4.	"Thangalaye"	S. P. Balasubrahmanyam	4:53
5.	"Vanga Kadal"	S. P. Balasubrahmanyam	4:58
6.	"Karpulla Kaalaiya"	S. P. Balasubrahmanyam, Manorama	4:39
Total length:			29:13

== Reception ==
Malini Mannath of The Indian Express wrote, "With a weak storyline, an abundance of characters who are never really justified, and a half-hearted treatment, Magudam is a film which never really takes off from the scene one". Sujitha Sridharan of Kalki felt the film had very artificial scenes, fragmented scenes and ordinary music from Ilaiyaraaja.
