= Pappu (film) =

- Directed by: Baby
- Screenplay by: Baby
- Story by: K. Balachander
- Starring: Prathap Pothen; Seema; Sukumari; Jagathy Sreekumar
- Cinematography: K. B. Dayalan
- Edited by: K. Sankunni
- Music by: K. J. Joy; Lyrics: Bichu Thirumala
- Production company: Dhanya
- Release date: 6 November 1980
- Country: India
- Language: Malayalam

Pappu is a 1980 Indian Malayalam-language film, directed by Baby and produced by Raghu Kumar. The film stars Prathap Pothen, Seema, Sukumari and Jagathy Sreekumar. It is a remake of the 1964 Tamil film Server Sundaram. The film has musical score by K. J. Joy.

== Cast ==
- Prathap Pothen
- Seema
- Sukumari
- Jagathy Sreekumar
- Prathapachandran
- M. G. Soman
- Kaviyoor Ponnamma
- Adoor Bhasi
- Sreelatha Namboothiri
- Ravikumar
- Ravi

== Soundtrack ==
The music was composed by K. J. Joy.

| No. | Song | Singers | Lyrics |
|---|---|---|---|
| 1 | "Kurumozhi Koonthalil Vidarumo" | K. J. Yesudas, S. Janaki | Bichu Thirumala |
| 2 | "Madhumalar Thaalamenthum" | K. J. Yesudas | Bichu Thirumala |
| 3 | "Poo Poo Uthaapoo Kaayaampoo" | Vani Jairam, Chorus | Bichu Thirumala |
| 4 | "Pushyaraagam Nrithamadum" | P. Jayachandran, Vani Jairam | Bichu Thirumala |
| 5 | "Thathappenne Thanchathil Vaa" | P. Susheela, Pattom Sadan | Bichu Thirumala |
