= Prema Yuddham =

1990 film by Rajendra Singh Babu

- Theatrical release poster
- Directed by: S. V. Rajendra Singh Babu
- Written by: Sainath Thotapalli (dialogues)
- Screenplay by: S. V. Rajendra Singh Babu
- Story by: S. V. Rajendra Singh Babu
- Produced by: P. Vijaya Kumari
- Starring: Nagarjuna; Amala; Mohan Babu; Amjad Khan
- Cinematography: P. S. Prakash
- Edited by: Gautham Raju
- Music by: Hamsalekha
- Production company: Anupama Arts
- Release date: 23 March 1990
- Running time: 166 minutes
- Country: India
- Language: Telugu

Prema Yuddham (transl. Love War) is a 1990 Telugu-language romance film produced by P. Vijaya Kumari under the Anupama Arts banner, directed by S. V. Rajendra Singh Babu. It stars Nagarjuna, Amala with music composed by Hamsalekha. The film was simultaneously shot in Kannada as Bannada Gejje, with V. Ravichandran by the same director. The film was dubbed into Tamil as Idhaya Geetham and in Hindi as Prem Jung.

== Cast ==
- Nagarjuna as Kalyan
- Amala as Latha
- Mohan Babu as Jayasimha
- Amjad Khan
- Devaraj as Ranjith
- Giri Babu
- Vani Viswanath
- Bharathi as Vyjayanthi
- Dubbing Janaki

== Production ==
The film was made on a budget of 4 crores with sets of every song costing 15 lakhs. One song was shot at Kashmir hills, another song at Nagarjuna Sagar while another one was picturised at Bangalore Cricket Stadium for nine days for which artificial rainfall was used.

== Soundtrack ==
Prema Yuddham

Film score by Hamsalekha
- Released: 1990
- Genre: Soundtrack
- Length: 40:39
- Label: Lahari Audio
- Producer: Hamsalekha

Hamsalekha chronology
Agni (1989)	Prema Yuddham (1990)	Shanti Kranti (1991)

The film's soundtrack was composed by Hamsalekha. The song "Swathi Muthyapu" was recreated in Action 3D (2013).

No.	Title	Lyrics	Singer(s)	Length
1.	"Hey Nenera Yuva Hero"	Veturi	S.P. Balu, Mano	4:43
2.	"Swathi Muthyapu"	Veturi	S.P. Balu, S. Janaki	6:26
3.	"Prema Geema"	Acharya Aatreya	S.P. Balu, S. Janaki	6:13
4.	"Dance Dance"	Veturi	S.P. Balu, S. Janaki	4:54
5.	"Yoga Yoga"	Achrya Atreya	S.P. Balu, S. Janaki	4:37
6.	"Bombatt Bombatt"	Veturi	S.P. Balu, S. Janaki	4:46
7.	"Ivvi Muripinchu"	Acharya Aatreya	S.P. Balu, S. Janaki	9:00
Total length:				40:39
