= Madhu Malar =

- Poster
- Directed by: Bharathi–Vasu
- Screenplay by: Bharathi–Vasu
- Story by: K. Somasundareshwar
- Produced by: V. F. Irani
- Starring: Pratap Pothen; Suhasini
- Cinematography: M. C. Sekar
- Edited by: P. Venkateswara Rao
- Music by: Gangai Amaran
- Production company: Rishad Creations
- Release date: 27 November 1981
- Country: India
- Language: Tamil

Madhu Malar is a 1981 Indian Tamil-language film jointly directed by Santhana Bharathi and P. Vasu. The film stars Pratap Pothen and Suhasini. It was released on 27 November 1981.

== Cast ==
- Pratap Pothen as Madhu
- Suhasini as Malar
- Ratheesh
- A. R. S.
- Vennira Aadai Moorthy
- Dilip
- Vanitha Krishnachandran

== Production ==
Madhu Malar is the second directorial venture of Bharathi–Vasu after Panneer Pushpangal, released earlier the same year.

== Soundtrack ==
The music was composed by Gangai Amaran.

Track listing
No.	Title	Lyrics	Singer(s)	Length
1.	"Vaaname"	Gangai Amaran	K. J. Yesudas, Uma Ramanan
2.	"Kairasiye"	Vaali	Malaysia Vasudevan, T. L. Maharajan
3.	"Maalaiye"	Paavannan	S. Janaki
4.	"Anandhame"	Muthulingam	S. P. Balasubrahmanyam

== Reception ==
Nalini Sastry of Kalki praised Gangai Amaran's music, Sekar's cinematography while also panning his camerawork for certain scenes as out of focus while also panning dialogues for being intellectual and panned the ill-suited ending felt it could have been changed and noted the team who showed promise in Panneer Pushpangal did not improve here. Nachi of Pesum Padam also reviewed the film. According to Bharathi–Vasu, the film failed due to its plot.
