= Aaravam =

1978 film

- Directed by: Bharathan
- Screenplay by: Bharathan
- Produced by: Ameer; Bharathan
- Starring: Nedumudi Venu; Bahadur; Prathap Pothan; KPAC Lalitha; Prameela; Kottayam Santha; Janardhanan
- Cinematography: Ashok Kumar
- Edited by: N. P. Suresh
- Music by: M. G. Radhakrishnan (songs); Ousepachan / Johnson (score)
- Production company: Creative Unit
- Distributed by: Creative Unit
- Release date: 24 November 1978
- Country: India
- Language: Malayalam

Aaravam is a 1978 Indian Malayalam film, directed by Bharathan. The film stars Nedumudi Venu, Prameela, Pratap Pothan, KPAC Lalitha, Bahadoor and Janardhanan in the lead roles. Actor Pratap Pothan was introduced in this film along with composer Ousepachan, who played the role of a fiddle player. The cinematography was handled by Ashok Kumar. The film has musical score by M. G. Radhakrishnan and background score by Johnson and Ousepachan. The story revolves around Marudhu, a village hunter and wanderer and his love interest named Kaveri, in the village, who runs a tea shop and how their life affected by the arrival of a Circus group in the village. It was a commercial failure.

== Plot ==
The movie starts with a Hunting scene of Maruthu. He is a very distorted person. Maruthu hunts rabbits and local birds for a living. Kaveri runs a tea shop in the name of Kadavul Sahayam tea shop. Anthony is the bus driver in that village. Kaveri has affair with Anthony and Maruthu. But she cares more about Maruthu. Upon her request Maruthu stays with her as caretaker and so called Husband, this makes Anthony angry. Another different character in the movie is Kokkarako annan. He is fond of chickens, always keep two in his hands. He consider them as his sons. One day a circus team comes to that village and they get impressed by the tricks of Maruthu. Maruthu agrees to join them. He gets close to stripping girl. This make Kaveri a little desperate.

== Cast ==
- Nedumudi Venu as Maruthu
- Prameela as Kaveri
- KPAC Lalitha as Alamelu
- Prathap Pothen as Kokkarakko Annan
- Kottayam Santha as Mrs. Murukayya
- Ouseppachan
- Manavalan Joseph
- Pattom Sadan
- Maniyanpilla Raju
- Bahadoor as Murukayya
- Janardanan as Anthony
- Suchitra
- Ouseppachan as fiddle player
- Hamza
- Sudheer Kumar
- Basheer

== Soundtrack ==
The music was composed by M. G. Radhakrishnan and the lyrics were written by Kavalam Narayana Panicker.

No.	Song	Singers	Lyrics	Length (m:ss)
1	"Ezhu Nilayulla Chaayakkada"	Ambili	Kavalam Narayana Panicker	
2	"Jillam Jillam"	K. J. Yesudas	Kavalam Narayana Panicker	
3	"Kaattil Thekkannam Kaattil"	S. Janaki	Kavalam Narayana Panicker	
4	"Mukkutti Thiruthali"	K. J. Yesudas	Kavalam Narayana Panicker	
