= Sainath Thotapalli =

Indian screenwriter

Sainath Thotapalli (born 27 April 1956) is a well-known writer from the Telugu film industry (also known as Tollywood) and has written for 107 Telugu movies so far including Sitara, Swathimutyam, Swarnakamalam, Swayamkrushi, Sirivennela, Prema, Challenge, Marana Mrudangam, Pavitra Prema and Rakhi among others. He was also long associated with the Mumbai film industry (also known as Bollywood) for movies such as Criminal and Gundagardi.

He worked on Padiappa, Veetilo Viseshamga, Madrasi and Villain for the Chennai film industry (also known as Kollywood). Sainath's contribution to Kannada language films (Years 1995–2000) include the only two films that the ex-chief minister Ramakrishna Hegde acted in – Prajashakthi and Marana Mrudanga. His association with the Kannada film industry has been for 14 Kannada films so far including Halunda Tavaru, Lion Jagapathi Rao among others.

== Biography ==
Sainath is the fourth born to TSS Sharma and Susheela in Ananthapur from their seven children. Thanks to his father's job as a railway station master, he travelled extensively during his formative years and did his schooling from Chennai (then Madras), Rajahmundry, Anaparthi, Gudivada, Ongole and Nellore before going to Vijayawada. He did his graduation in BSc from SRR and CVR Government College at Vijayawada.

His writing skills started showing right from his school days when he wrote his first drama in class 7th and continued this work in the form of writing short stories during college. His first serious association with the creative industry started with his joining Kalabharathi, founded by Jandhyala Subramanya Sastry (who he considers his guru) in 1972. Here, he started acting in various plays and wrote his first playlet "Konark Vastunondi" in 1973. His play "Chaitanyam" was aired on All India Radio in 1974 and Vennela Keretam in 1976.

In 1979, he was taken by Jandhyala Subramanya Sastry as his writing assistant. In a span of nine months thereon, he worked on fourteen films as a writing assistant, both for Jandhyala and Satyanand. In 1982, he started his real work in the film industry as a script associate for Amayaka Chakrayavarthi for Janardhan Vallabhaneni (Producer: Vijay Bapineedu).

In 1984, Vamsi's Sitara was a major hit for which he debuted as dialogue writer,[1] and he continued his work for some of the most successful movies of the time until 2009. Some of the films include Swathi Muthyam, Swayamkrushi, Sirivennela, Challenge, Punya Stree, Swarnakamalam, Prema, Criminal and Krishna Vamsi's Rakhi among 92 films in Telugu. His strong association with the television medium gave several outputs in the form of soaps Anubandham, Kalisiundaam Raa for Balaji Telefilms and Gayatri for Radon Media Ltd. He wrote for Janani produced by Jayasudha and Manase Mandiram for Kutty Padmini.

He is writer and director for Saakshi TV through Goli Soda, a political satire during 2008 General Elections. He was writer director for "Mixture Bandi" on TV5 during 2009, a weekly satire on political and film related developments during each week. Sainath is currently associated with his longtime associate K Vishwanath and working with Larsco Entertainment. Sainath lives with his wife Aruna in Hyderabad with his son Sai Charan and daughter Sameera T.

== Filmography ==
=== Telugu ===
- Sitaara (1984)
- Swati Mutyam (1984)
- Challenge (1984)
- Punyasthree (1985)
- Sirivennela (1985)
- Swayamkrushi (1986)
- Marana Mrudangam (1987)
- Swarnakamalam (1988)
- Prema Yuddham (1988)
- Prema (1989)
- Shanti Kranti (1991)
- Rao Gari Intlo Rowdy (1990)
- Rakhi (2006)
- Pavitra Prema
- Criminal (1995)
- Pelli Gola
- Pichhodi Cheti lo Rai
- Sanchalanam
- Amma-Naanna Kaavaali
- Khaidi Dada
- Saakshi
- Ukku Sankellu
- Lady James Bond
- Punnami Raatri
- Maa Vaari Gola
- Babai Hotel
- Kongu Chaatu Krishnudu
- Paaripoyina Khaideelu
- Anna Tammudu
- Donga Garu Swagatham
- Krishna Gari Abbai
- Vastaad
- Yama Dootalu
- Swethanaagu (2004)
- Slokam (2005)
- Sivaram
- Villain (2003)
- Todu Needa
- Viyyala Vari Kayyalu
- Subhapradam (2010)
- 2011 Edukondalavadu
- 2012 Tuniga Tuniga
- 2014-15 Krishnamma Kalipindi Iddarini
- 2015 Bahubali

=== Hindi ===
- 1995 Criminal (Mukesh Bhatt, Mahesh Bhatt, Nagarjuna, Manisha Koirala, Ramya Krishna)
- 1997 Gundagardi (KC Bokadia, Dharmendra, Vijay Shanthi, Simran, Aditya Panc

=== Tamil ===
- 1999 Padayappa(KS Ravi Kumar, Rajnikanth, Ramya Krishna, Soundarya)

=== Kannada ===
- 1990 Lion Jagapathi Rao (Vijay Kumar, Sai Prakash, Vishnu Vardhan, Lakshmi, Bhavya)
- 1992 Prajashakthi (Chidambar Shetty, D Rajendra Babu, Ramakrishna Hegde, Malasree)
- 1993 Marana Mrudanga (Chidambar Shetty, Rama Murthy, Ramakrishna Hegde, Malasree)
- 1994 Halunda Thavaru (Vizag Raju, D Rajendra Babu, Vishnu Vardhan, Sitara)
- 2015 Untitled. R Chandru directing, script underway
- 2015 "Lady Singham", Vijay Kumar as Producer, Sai Prakash as Director, production planning
- Other Kannada Movies include: Jagadeka Veera, Roll Call Ramakrishna, Vyuha, Pradhama Sparsa, Soma, Jeevanadhi, Raja, Swaranjali among others.
