= Oru Yathramozhi =

- Poster
- Directed by: Prathap Pothan
- Screenplay by: John Paul
- Story by: Priyadarshan
- Produced by: V. B. K. Menon
- Starring: Mohanlal; Sivaji Ganesan
- Cinematography: Muthukumar
- Edited by: B. Lenin; V. T. Vijayan
- Music by: Ilaiyaraaja
- Production company: Anugraha Cine Arts
- Distributed by: Anugraha Release
- Release date: 13 September 1997
- Country: India
- Language: Malayalam

Oru Yathramozhi (transl. An adieu) is a 1997 Indian Malayalam-language drama film directed by Prathap Pothan, based on a story by Priyadarshan and a screenplay by John Paul. It stars Mohanlal and Sivaji Ganesan. It was produced by V. B. K. Menon and distributed by Anugraha Release. The music was composed by Ilaiyaraaja.

== Plot ==
It is a story about a father and a son, which is filled with sentiment or sorrow. Govindankutty is on the lookout for his unknown father, seeking to take revenge by killing him for leaving him and his mother. Then enters Anantha Subramaniam, a Tamil government contractor, who comes to Govindankutty's hometown and likes him instantly for his loyalty and honesty.

Both become very close to each other. The story takes a turn when Govindankutty's mother recognizes the contractor as her long-lost husband. She dies fearing that Govindankutty will kill his father on knowing the truth. The story then comes to the climax as to whether Govindankutty knows who his father is and what happens next.

== Cast ==
- Mohanlal as Govindankutty / Chinna
- Sivaji Ganesan as Anantha Subramaniam / Periyavar
- Ranjitha as Nandhini
- Bharathi Vishnuvardhan as Gowri, Chinna's mother
- Nedumudi Venu as Appu Nair
- M. G. Soman as Santhosh, Brother In Law of Appu
- V. K. Sreeraman as Parameshwaran Nair
- Prakash Raj as Chandran
- N. F. Varghese as Rameshan, Police officer
- Bahadoor as Pappan
- Maniyanpilla Raju as Namboothiri
- Thilakan as Adhruman (Abdul Rahiman)
- K. R. Vatsala as lalitha, Premeswaran's Wife
- Krishna Prasad as Unni/Namboothiri Kutti
- Reena as Nandhini's Cousin Sister
- Jayaraj Warrier as Tea Shop Owner Jayarajan
- Ram Lakshman (stunt choreographers) as Tiger Antony

== Production ==
Swarnachamaram is a film that was shelved as a result of creative differences over the topic of mercy killing. Many scenes were edited out of the film along with a song by Mohanlal and Sivaji Ganesan. Producer V. B. K. Menon used the same dates and completed Oru Yathramozhi, starring Mohanlal in the lead role along with Tamil actor Sivaji Ganesan in a supporting role. The movie was not released until a year or so after completion.

== Soundtrack ==
All lyrics are written by Gireesh Puthenchery; all music is composed by Ilaiyaraaja.

No.	Title	Singer(s)	Length
1.	"Thaimavin Thanalil"	K. S. Chithra, M. G. Sreekumar	4:09
2.	"Kakkalakkannamma(film version)"	Ilaiyaraja, Arunmozhi	4:49
3.	"Kakkalakkannamma(audio version)"	S. P. Balasubrahmanyam, M.G. Sreekumar	4:49
4.	"Manjolum Rathri Maanju"	P. Jayachandran	4:26
5.	"Ponveyilile"	M. G. Sreekumar, K. S. Chithra	4:54
6.	"Erikanal kaattil"	M. S. Viswanathan	4:45

== Release ==
The film's initial release date was 15 August 1996, but the release was postponed and finally graced theatres only in 1997. The film was dubbed in Tamil as Payanathin Mozhi in 2017.

== Reception ==
A critic from The Hindu wrote that "Priyadarshan's story and John Paul's dialogue give ample strength to the characters with Muthukumar's lens graphically capturing the scenic beauty of the locations".
