= Lion Jagapathi Rao =

- Directed by: Om Sai Prakash
- Screenplay by: Sainath Thotapalli; V. R. Bhaskar; Vishnuvardhan
- Dialogues by: V. R. Bhaskar; B. L. Venu
- Story by: Sainath Thotapalli
- Starring: Vishnuvardhan; Bhavya; Lakshmi
- Cinematography: D. V. Rajaram
- Edited by: Victor Yadav
- Music by: Upendra Kumar
- Production company: Sri Vinayaka Combines
- Release date: 1991
- Running time: 144 minutes
- Country: India
- Language: Kannada

Lion Jagapathi Rao is a 1991 Indian Kannada-language drama film, directed by Om Sai Prakash and written by Sainath Thotapalli, starring Vishnuvardhan in dual roles, along with Lakshmi and Bhavya. The film was produced by Sri Vinayaka Combines.

The film was critically acclaimed upon release and won laurels at the Karnataka State Film Awards. The lead actor Vishnuvardhan was adjudged the Best Actor for the year 1991. Vishnuvardhan himself was one of the screenplay writers for the movie.

== Cast ==
- Vishnuvardhan as Lion Jagapathi Rao and Inspector Kumar
- Lakshmi as Janaki, Rao's wife and Kumar's mother
- Bhavya as Gayathri, Kumar's wife
- Mukhyamantri Chandru as Parvathayya
- Aravind
- Sadashiva Saliyan as Harihara Prasad
- Rajanand
- Ramamurthy
- Umesh
- Mysore Lokesh as Anthony
- Shanthamma
- Prithvi Vazir as Vishal

== Soundtrack ==
The music of the film was composed by Upendra Kumar and the lyrics were written by R. N. Jayagopal.

Lion Jagapathi Rao

Soundtrack album by Upendra Kumar
- Released: 1991
- Genre: Feature film soundtrack
- Label: Sangeetha

No.	Title	Lyrics	Singer(s)	Length
1.	"Kumar Kumar"	R. N. Jayagopal	S. P. Balasubrahmanyam, S. Janaki
2.	"Swagatha Nimage"	R. N. Jayagopal	S. Janaki
3.	"Vidhyabuddhi"	R. N. Jayagopal	S. Janaki
4.	"Enidu Shodhane"	R. N. Jayagopal	S. P. Balasubrahmanyam
5.	"Agajanana"	Traditional	S. P. Balasubrahmanyam
6.	"Premake Permit Banthu"	R. N. Jayagopal	S. P. Balasubrahmanyam, S. Janaki
