= Jeeva (1988 film) =

- Theatrical release poster
- Directed by: Pratap Pothen
- Written by: A. L. Narayanan (dialogues)
- Screenplay by: Pratap Pothen
- Story by: Pratap Pothen
- Produced by: T. G. Thyagarajan; G. Saravanan
- Starring: Sathyaraj; Amala
- Cinematography: Ashok Kumar
- Edited by: B. Lenin; V. T. Vijayan
- Music by: Gangai Amaran
- Production company: Sathya Jyothi Films
- Release date: 1 July 1988
- Country: India
- Language: Tamil

Jeeva is a 1988 Indian Tamil-language action film, directed by Pratap Pothen, starring Sathyaraj and Amala. Amala created a sensation by appearing in a bikini onscreen. The film was remade in Hindi as Baaz (1992).

== Plot ==
Jeeva is a carefree unemployed youth living with his widowed mother and sister. When they are murdered, he seeks revenge.

== Cast ==
- Sathyaraj as Jeeva
- Amala as Geetha
- Janagaraj as Dilli
- Nizhalgal Ravi as Anand
- Captain Raju as DSP Dhairiyam
- Pradeep Shakthi as Somnath
- R. S. Shivaji as Henchmen
- Anandaraj as main henchmen
- Lalu Alex as C.J. Dass
- Silk Smitha as Monika
- Oru Viral Krishna Rao
- Thalapathy Dinesh
- Raasi as sister
- Pratap Pothan as magician in song "Abracadabra"
- Prabhu Deva as dancer in song "Abracadabra"

== Soundtrack ==
The soundtrack was composed by Gangai Amaran. Lyrics by him and Pulamaipithan.

Track listing
No.	Title	Singer(s)	Length
1.	"Abracadabra"	S. P. Balasubrahmanyam
2.	"Hero Vandhachu"	S. P. Balasubrahmanyam, K. S. Chithra
3.	"Pattuvanna Rosa"	K. S. Chithra
4.	"Sangeetham"	Malaysia Vasudevan, Sunanda (singer), S. N. Surendar
5.	"Thagudu"	S. P. Balasubrahmanyam
6.	"O Thendrale"	K. J. Yesudas

== Release and reception ==
Jeeva was released on 1 July 1988. On 22 July that month, N. Krishnaswamy of The Indian Express said, "Pratap Pothen, in his attempt to put together a commercial yarn for Satya Movies, totters between two stools of varied height. On the one hand he tries to give a modish feel to his film – the jazzy interiors, the costumes that his actors wear, the five-star hotel-ad agency ambiance – but on the other he has to give a long rope to hero Satyaraj's attempts to play to a plebeian constituency. Pothen ends up being stylish and moronic. This makes an incongruous mixture."
