= Bhanupriya =

Indian actress

banupriya
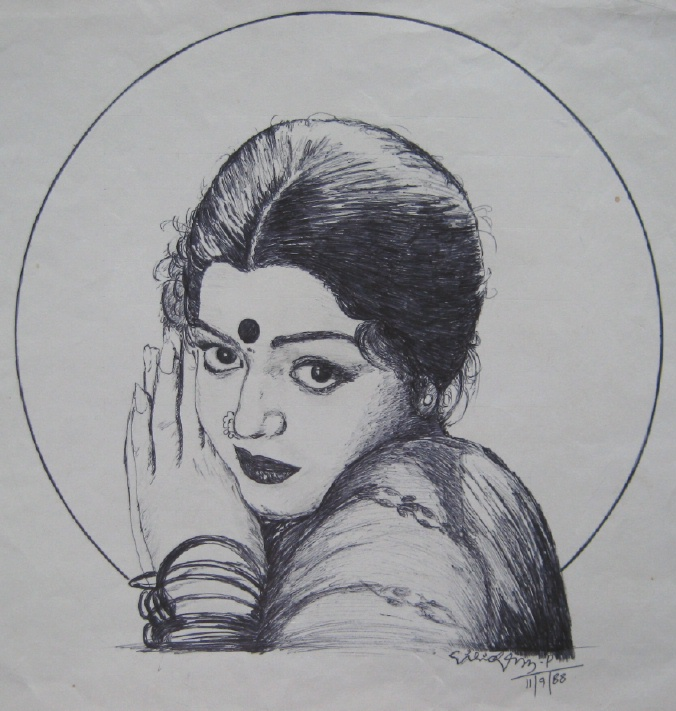
- Portrait of Bhanu Priya
- Born: Manga Anandha Bhanu; 15 January 1967 (age 59); Rajahmundry, Andhra Pradesh, India (present-day Rajamahendravaram)
- Years active: 1983–present
- Spouse: Adarsh Kaushal (m. 1998–2018)
- Children: 1
- Relatives: Shantipriya (sister)

Bhanupriya (born Manga Anandha Bhanu; 15 January 1967) is an Indian actress and dancer. In a four-decade-long career, she has appeared in 165 feature films, predominantly in Telugu and Tamil, and a few in Malayalam, Kannada and Hindi films. She has starred in a variety of roles, which garnered her three state Nandi Awards, two Tamil Nadu State Film Awards, two Filmfare Awards South and two Cinema Express Awards.

== Early life ==
Bhanupriya was born on 15 January 1967 in Rangampeta near Rajahmundry, Andhra Pradesh into a Telugu family, to Pandu Babu and Ragamali. She was named Mangabhanu after birth. Her family later moved to Chennai, Tamil Nadu.

== Career ==
She was one of the top mainstream actresses for more than a decade from 1983 to 1995. She was originally chosen to be the lead actress for Thooral Ninnu Pochchu (1982) after Bhagyaraj spotted her at a dance school, but after the photoshoot he felt she looked too young for this role and she was replaced by Sulakshana thus made her acting debut with the Tamil film Mella Pesungal (1983). She then appeared in the Telugu hit Sitaara (1984), which won the National Film Award for Best Feature Film in Telugu for that year. She then played an ornithologist in the 1985 Telugu mystery film Anveshana. In 1986, she made her Hindi film debut with Dosti Dushmani. In 1988, she appeared in the Telugu film Swarnakamalam, which was screened at the Indian panorama section of the 1988 International Film Festival of India, and the Ann Arbor Film Festival. Bhanupriya received the Indian Express Award for Best Actress, the Nandi Award for Best Actress, and the Filmfare Award for Best Actress – Telugu for her performance in the film. In 1989 and 1991, her performances in the Tamil hits Aararo Aariraro, and Azhagan brought her the Tamil Nadu State Film Award Special Prizes, respectively. She received the JFW Divas of South India Award for her contribution to South Indian cinema, the Gemini TV Puraskaram for lifetime achievement in television and various other honours.

== Personal life ==
She has an elder brother Gopikrishana, and a younger sister Shantipriya, who is also an actress. Bhanupriya married Adarsh Kaushal, a digital graphics engineer, at the Sri Venkateswara temple in Malibu, California, on 14 June 1998. The couple has a daughter, Abhinaya, born in 2002. Bhanupriya returned to India, and resumed her acting career. She lives in Chennai with her daughter. Kaushal died in 2018 after suffering a cardiac arrest.

== Filmography ==
=== Film ===
==== Acting roles ====
List of films and roles
Year	Title	Role	Language	Notes
1983	Mella Pesungal	Uma	Tamil	Tamil debut
1984	Etho Mogam	Geetha	Tamil	
1984	Sitaara	Sitaara / Kokila	Telugu	Telugu debut
1984	Rowdy	Ganga	Telugu	
1984	Eduruleni Monagallu	Rani	Telugu	
1984	Ramayanamlo Bhagavatam		Telugu	
1984	Palnati Puli	Rani	Telugu	
1984	James Bond 999	Neelima	Telugu	
1984	Chadarangam	Meena	Telugu	
1984	Gruhalakshmi	Swapna Priya	Telugu	
1984	Illale Devata	Radha	Telugu	
1985	Mogudu Pellalu	Saroja	Telugu	
1985	Musugu Donga	Swapna	Telugu	
1985	Chiranjeevi	Shanti	Telugu	
1985	Bangaru Chiluka	Hema/Chilaka	Telugu	Dual Role
1985	Preminchu Pelladu	Radha	Telugu	
1985	Jwala		Telugu	
1985	Thendral Thodhata Malar	Valli	Tamil	
1985	Garjana	Vijaya	Telugu	
1985	Kutumba Bandham	Lakshmi	Telugu	
1985	Illaliko Pariksha		Telugu	
1985	Aatmabalam	Vaishali	Telugu	
1985	America Alludu	Radha	Telugu	
1985	Vijetha	Priyadarsini	Telugu	
1985	Anveshana	Hema	Telugu	
1986	Bhale Mitrulu	Bharathi	Telugu	
1986	Manchi Manasulu	Janaki	Telugu	
1986	Pratibhavantudu		Telugu	
1986	Sravana Meghaalu		Telugu	
1986	Samajamlo Sthree		Telugu	
1986	Konaseema Kurradu	Jyothi	Telugu	
1986	Kashmora	Tulasi	Telugu	
1986	Dosti Dushmani	Rekha	Hindi	Hindi Debut
1986	Aalapana	Usha	Telugu	
1986	Apoorva Sahodarulu	Roja	Telugu	
1986	Anadiga Aadadi	Geetha	Telugu	
1986	Anasuyamma Gari Alludu	Rukmini	Telugu	
1986	Chadastapu Mogudu	Janaki	Telugu	
1987	Srinivasa Kalyanam	Lalitha	Telugu	
1987	Shankaravam	Jyothi	Telugu	
1987	Prema Samrat	Madhulatha	Telugu	
1987	Insaf Ki Pukar	Rani	Hindi	
1987	Prema Deepalu		Telugu	
1987	Chakravarthy	Rani	Telugu	
1987	Karthika Pournami	Abilasha/Gowri	Telugu	Dual Role
1987	Khudgarz	Jaya Saxena	Hindi	
1987	Donga Mogudu	Priyamvada	Telugu	
1987	Allari Krishnayya	Lalitha	Telugu	
1987	Dharmapatni	S.I Vidya	Telugu	
1987	Jebu Donga	Bujji	Telugu	
1988	Mar Mitenge	Jenny	Hindi	
1988	Bharatamlo Bala Chandrudu	Bhanu	Telugu	
1988	Nyayaniki Siksha	Sita	Telugu	
1988	Jhansi Rani	Jhansi Rani	Telugu	
1988	Agni Keratalu	Bhanurekha	Telugu	
1988	Tiragabadda Telugubidda	Padma	Telugu	
1988	Tamacha	Seema	Hindi	
1988	Khaidi No. 786	Radha	Telugu	
1988	Trinetrudu	Pratyusha	Telugu	
1988	Swarnakamalam	Meenakshi	Telugu	Nandi Award for Best Actress; Filmfare Award for Best Telugu Actress
1989	Suryaa: An Awakening	Shanoo	Hindi	
1989	State Rowdy	Asha	Telugu	
1989	Bhagawan	Rekha	Telugu	
1989	Black Tiger		Telugu	
1989	Dav Pech	Sunita Verma	Hindi	
1989	Garibon Ka Daata	Naina	Hindi	
1989	Gudachari 117		Telugu	
1989	Kasam Vardi Ki	Aarthi	Hindi	
1989	Ashoka Chakravarthy	Urmila	Telugu	
1989	Aararo Aariraro	Meenu	Tamil	Filmfare Award for Best Actress Tamil; Tamil Nadu State Film Award Special Prize
1990	Zahreelay	Seema	Hindi	
1990	Sirayil Pootha Chinna Malar	Chitra	Tamil	
1990	Jayasimha	Geetha	Telugu	
1990	Chatriyan	Banu	Tamil	
1991	Bhabhi	Sita/Kamini	Hindi	Dual Role
1991	Pudhu Manithan	Sugandhi	Tamil	
1991	Gopura Vasalile	Kalyani	Tamil	
1991	Sri Edu Kondala Swamy	Goddess Padmavati Devi	Telugu	
1991	Pondatti Sonna Kettukanum	Indira	Tamil	
1991	Azhagan	Priya Ranjan	Tamil	Tamil Nadu State Film Award Special Prize
1991	People's Encounter		Telugu	
1991	Bramma	Pavitra	Tamil	
1991	Thalapathi	Padma	Tamil	
1991	Thaipoosam	Sivagami	Tamil	
1991	Ramudu Kadhu Rakshasudu	Revathi	Telugu	
1992	Amaran	Sivagaami	Tamil	
1992	Sundara Kandam	Deivanai	Tamil	
1992	Bharathan	Indhu	Tamil	
1992	Therku Theru Machan	Parimala	Tamil	
1992	Vaaname Ellai	Herself	Tamil	Guest Appearance in a special song
1992	Rajashilpi	Durga	Malayalam	Malayalam debut
1992	Magudam	Bhavani	Tamil	
1992	Pangali	Saidhai Tamizharasi	Tamil	
1992	Neenga Nalla Irukkanum	Anjalai	Tamil	
1992	Kaviya Thalaivan	Priya / Saradha	Tamil	Dual Role
1993	Kattalai	Vijaya		
1993	Porantha Veeda Puguntha Veeda	Amudha		
1993	Bhagath		Telugu	
1993	Maharasan	Selvi	Tamil	
1993	Mutrugai	DSP Bhavani	Tamil	
1993	Rajadurai	Radha	Tamil	Guest Appearance in special song
1993	Kirayi Gunda		Telugu	
1993	Gokulam	Gayathri/Mary	Tamil	
1993	Uzhavan		Tamil	
1994	Rasika		Kannada	Kannada debut
1994	Ish Gup Chup	Ravali	Telugu	
1994	Bangaru Mogudu	Amulya	Telugu	
1995	Highway	Meera	Malayalam	
1995	Pedarayudu	Lakshmi	Telugu	
1995	Chakravarthy	Bhanu	Tamil	
1996	Azhakiya Ravanan	Anuradha	Malayalam	
1996	Amma Durgamma	Goddess Durga	Telugu	
1997	Mama Bagunnava	Gowri	Telugu	
1997	Aahaa..!	Geeta	Telugu	Cameo appearance
1997	Annamayya	Goddess Padmavathi	Telugu	
1997	Kulam	Subhadra	Malayalam	
1997	Rishyasringan	Poornima	Malayalam	
1997	Thalaimurai	Panchavarnam	Tamil	
1997	Aahaa..!	Rajeswari (Raaji)	Tamil	
1999	Endrendrum Kadhal	Pooja	Tamil	
1999	Anantha Poongathe	Banu	Tamil	Guest Appearance
2000	Annai	Kanagamagalatchumi	Tamil	
2000	14 February Necklace Road		Telugu	Guest appearance
2000	Ayodhya Ramayya	Padmavathi	Telugu	
2000	Jayam Manadera	Bhuvaneswari	Telugu	
2000	Hindustan: The Mother		Telugu	
2000	Kochu Kochu Santhoshangal	Maya Varma	Malayalam	
2000	Devara Maga	Annapoorna	Kannada	
2001	Sri Raja Rajeshwari	Goddess Parasakthi	Tamil	
2001	Thaali Kaatha Kaaliamman	Goddess Kaali	Tamil	
2002	Simhadriya Simha	Lakshmi	Kannada	
2002	Naina	Azhagu Nachiyar	Tamil	
2002	Lahiri Lahiri Lahirilo	Indu	Telugu	Nandi Award for Best Supporting Actress
2004	Jai	Veerapandi's wife/Jai's mother	Tamil	
2004	Jore	Meenakshi	Tamil	
2004	Chellamae	Herself	Tamil	Guest Appearance in a song "Kummi Adi"
2004	Manjupoloru Penkutti	Arundathi	Malayalam	
2004	Kadamba	Yamini	Kannada	
2004	Sravanamasam	Rajyam	Telugu	
2005	Orey Pandu	Akhilandeswari	Telugu	
2005	Goutham SSC	Bhanu	Telugu	
2005	Chatrapathi	Rajya Lakshmi	Telugu	Nandi Award for Best Supporting Actress
2005	Hridayathi Sookshikkaan	Sreenath's mother	Malayalam	
2006	Raathrimazha		Malayalam	
2007	Oru Ponnu Oru Paiyan	Ganga	Tamil	
2007	Polladhavan	Thilaka	Tamil	
2008	Mahayagnam		Telugu	
2008	Theekuchi	Sakthi	Tamil	
2008	Pellaindi Kaani	Rajeshwari	Telugu	
2009	Mesthru		Kannada	
2010	My Name is Amruta		Telugu	
2012	3	Ram's mother	Tamil	
2012	Dammu	Vasundhara	Telugu	
2013	Chatrapathi		Kannada	
2014	Avathaaram	Akkamma	Telugu	
2017	Shivalinga	Sarala	Tamil	
2017	Magalir Mattum	Rani Amirthakumari	Tamil	
2018	Mahanati	Durgambha	Telugu	
2018	Kadaikutty Singam	Panchavanmadevi	Tamil	
2021	Natyam	Sitara's mother	Telugu	
2022	Sila Nerangalil Sila Manidhargal		Tamil	
2024	Ayalaan	Tamizh's mother	Tamil	

==== Dubbing artist ====
1996	Indian	Urmila Matondkar		Also dubbed for the Telugu version Bharateeyudu (1996)	
Year	Film	Dubbed for	Language	Notes	Ref
1997	Suryavamsam	Priya Raman	Tamil		
1997	Thayin Manikodi	Nivedita Jain	Tamil		
1998	Arunachalam	Rambha	Telugu	Dubbed Version	
2025	Bad Girl	Shantipriya	Tamil		

=== Television ===
List of television shows and roles
Year	Title	Role	Language	Channel	Notes
1989	Vishwamitra	Menaka	Hindi	DD National	
1991	Penn		Tamil		
1997-1998	Sakthi		Tamil	Sun TV	Role ended due to marriage with a newly created role for Sukanya.
2000	Manase Mandiram		Telugu	Gemini TV	
2000-2001	Vaazhkkai	Seetha	Tamil	Sun TV	
2000	Gopi AVM	Yasodha	Tamil	Sun TV	
2001-2002	Take It Easy Vaazhkai	Story Narrator	Tamil	DD Podhigai/Sun TV	
2004	Deivam	Seetha	Telugu	Gemini TV/Star Maa	
2004	Sarvamangala	Mangala	Telugu	Gemini TV	
2005-2006	Porandha Veeda Pugundha Veeda	Raji	Tamil	Sun TV	
2012-2013	Aaha	Raji	Tamil	Vijay TV	
2016–2017	Nathicharami	Yamuna	Telugu	Gemini TV	

== Awards ==
Nandi Awards

- Best Actress - Swarna Kamalam (1988)
- Best Character Actress - Lahiri Lahiri Lahirilo (2002)
- Best Supporting Actress - Chatrapati (2005)

Filmfare Awards South

- Best Actress - Telugu in 1988 for her performance in Swarna Kamalam
- Best Actress - Tamil in 1989 for her performance in Aararo Aaariraro

Other Awards

- Tamil Nadu State Film Award Special Prize in 1989 for the film Aararo Aaariraro
- Tamil Nadu State Film Award Special Prize in 1991 for the film Azhagan
- Cinema Express Awards in 1996 for the film Peddarayudu
- Screen Videocon Award for the television serial Shakti.
- JFW Divas of South - Awarded on 12 October 2012 by Just for Women magazine for her contribution to south Indian cinema.
