= Swarnakamalam =

- Theatrical Release poster
- Directed by: K. Viswanath
- Written by: K. Viswanath; Sainath (dialogue)
- Produced by: C. H. V. Appa Rao; K. S. Rama Rao (presenter)
- Starring: Venkatesh; Bhanupriya
- Cinematography: Lok Singh
- Edited by: G. G. Krishna Rao
- Music by: Ilayaraja
- Production company: Bhanu Art Creations
- Release date: 15 July 1988
- Running time: 143 minutes
- Country: India
- Language: Telugu

Swarnakamalam (transl. The golden lotus) is a 1988 Indian Telugu-language dance film written and directed by K. Viswanath. The film stars Venkatesh and Bhanupriya in the lead, while Sharon Lowen appears in a special role. The film is about a danseuse daughter of a noted Kuchipudi exponent, wooed by a painter of banners and hoardings, who uses her as a model. The choreography is helmed by Kelucharan Mohapatra, and Sharon Lowen with soundtrack by Ilaiyaraaja. The song sequences were extensively shot at the Valley of Flowers National Park, the Nanda Devi National Park, the Shanti Stupa and Bhringesvara Siva Temple at Dhauli; and other locations in Visakhapatnam.

Featured in the Indian panorama section of the 12th IFFI, the Asia Pacific Film Festival and the Ann Arbor Film Festival, it fetched three Indian Express Awards, three state Nandi Awards, and two South Filmfare Awards, including Nandi Award for Best Feature Film and Filmfare Best Film Award (Telugu).

== Plot ==
Savitri and Meenakshi are the daughters of Vedantam Seshendra Sarma, a deeply revered Kuchipudi dance exponent. Sarma is visually impaired, chronically ill, and lives in severe financial penury, leaving him unable to provide his daughters with a conventional formal education. Despite their poverty, both daughters have achieved a high degree of artistic proficiency under his strict guidance: the elder sister, Savitri, in classical Carnatic vocal music, and the younger, Meenakshi, in Kuchipudi dance. While Savitri is content with their modest lifestyle and deeply respects the art, Meenakshi is intensely bitter about their circumstances. Viewing classical dance as an impractical burden that yields no material security, she longs for a modern lifestyle and conventional employment.

Meanwhile, Chandrasekhar "Chandram", an easygoing commercial painter who designs cinema billboards and hoardings, moves into the vacant house next door. Deeply respecting Sarma's artistic legacy, Chandram quickly integrates himself into the family's daily life as a helpful neighbor. After clandestinely witnessing Meenakshi dancing with effortless, innate grace in a local park to express her inner joy, Chandram recognizes her immense latent talent. Hoping to push her to embrace her gift, he attempts to subtly revitalize public interest in the family's art by painting vibrant promotional hoardings featuring Meenakshi.

Meenakshi strongly resists Chandram's constant interventions and resents her father's demanding rehearsal schedules. Following Savitri's wedding, Meenakshi's defiance reaches a breaking point during a high-stakes public performance. Out of sheer frustration and a desire to escape her obligations, she intentionally sabotages her dance routine on stage. Heartbroken by his daughter's open disdain for the sacred art form, Sarma impulsively steps onto the stage to dance himself, but suffers a physical collapse and passes away.

Grief-stricken but determined to distance herself from her heritage, Meenakshi permanently abandons her dancing bells and takes a menial job as a hotel housekeeper to support herself. Undeterred by her hostility, Chandram continues to monitor her welfare and engineer scenarios to make her confront her true calling. He informs the hotel management of her talent, resulting in her being reassigned from housekeeping to perform as a classical dancer for hotel events, alongside a well-paying desk job at the hotel's cultural affairs club. Despite this elevation, Meenakshi remains resentful of the art.

The turning point occurs when Sharon Lowen, a celebrated Odissi dancer, stays at the hotel and witnesses Meenakshi perform. Lowen notes her underlying mastery but observes her complete lack of interest. Recognizing her rare caliber, Lowen counsels Meenakshi to recognize her own gift, emphasizing the spiritual importance of classical art forms. Lowen offers to take Meenakshi to the United States with her dance troupe on the condition that she learns to view her heritage as a privilege within three months.

Spurred by Lowen's challenge, Chandram and others persuade Meenakshi to undergo rigorous training. Surrounded by people who revere her late father's legacy, Meenakshi undergoes a profound psychological transformation, finally realizing the value of her artistic roots. Moved by her newfound dedication and improved performance, Lowen formally invites her to join the international tour. At the airport, just before departure, Meenakshi opens a letter from Chandram. She finally realizes that his persistent, selfless pushing over the years was born out of a genuine reverence for her talent and a deep, unconfessed love. Choosing her calling and her love over the immediate tour, Meenakshi exits the airport and rushes back to meet Chandram, where she reciprocates his feelings, and the two share an emotional embrace.

== Cast ==
- Venkatesh as Chandu / Chandra Shekar
- Bhanupriya as Meenakshi
- Shanmukha Srinivas as Srinivas
- Sakshi Ranga Rao as Omkaram
- Sri Lakshmi as Akhilam/ Akhilandeshwari
- S. K. Misro as Government official
- Devilalita as Savitri
- Dubbing Janaki
- Pavala Syamala
- Sharon Lowen as herself
- Mucherla Aruna as Meenakshi's friend
- K. V. Satyanarayana
- Vinnakota Vijayaram
- N. Sivarama Krishnaiah
- K. S. T. Sai
- S. S. Vajpayee
- Sudha

== Production ==
The production design was helmed by Arun D. Ghodgaonkar, with cinematography by Lok Singh. Casting was done by K. Viswanath, including American dancer Sharon Lowen, who portrayed herself as a veteran Odissi artist. He selected Sharon Lowen to portray the role after watching her interview on Doordarshan. Her odissi performance for the song "Sakhi Hey" was shot in Bhubaneswar. The song "Andela Ravamidhi Padamulada" was shot in Yusmarg, Sonamarg, and Pahalgam.

== Soundtrack ==
Swarnakamalam

Film score by Ilaiyaraaja
- Released: 1988
- Genre: Soundtrack
- Length: 50:27
- Label: Echo Music
- Producer: Ilaiyaraaja

Ilaiyaraaja chronology
Rudraveena (film) (1988)	Swarnakamalam (1988)	Varasudochhadu (1988)
External audio
- Swarnakamalam – Jukebox on YouTube

The music for the film was composed by Ilaiyaraaja and released on ECHO Music Company.

No.	Title	Lyrics	Singer(s)	Length
1.	"Ghallu Ghallu Ghallumantu"	Sirivennela Sitaramasastri	P. Susheela, S. P. Balasubrahmanyam	5:02
2.	"Aakasamlo Aasala Harivullu"	Sirivennela Sitaramasastri	S. Janaki	4:29
3.	"Kothaga Rekkalochena"	Sirivennela Sitaramasastri	S. P. Balasubrahmanyam & S. Janaki	4:29
4.	"Koluvaiyunnade Devadevudu"	Shahaji Maharaja of Tanjore	P. Susheela & S. P. Balasubrahmanyam	4:57
5.	"Andela Ravamidhi Padamulada"	Sirivennela Sitaramasastri	S. P. Balasubrahmanyam & Vani Jairam	6:59
6.	"Siva Poojaku Chivurinchina"	Sirivennela Sitaramasastri	P. Susheela & S. P. Balasubrahmanyam	6:04
7.	"Cheri Yasodaku Sisuvithadu"	Annamacharya	S. P. Sailaja	4:35
8.	"Aathmathvam"	Adi Shankara	S. Janaki	3:07
9.	"Natarajane"	Sirivennela Sitaramasastri	S.P. Sailaja	3:08
10.	"Sakhi Hey"	Jayadeva from Gita Govinda	Trupti Das	5:48
Total length:				50:27

== Awards ==
Nandi Awards - 1988

- Best Feature Film - Gold - Ch.V. Appa Rao
- Best Actress - Bhanupriya
- Best Choreographer - Srinivas
- Best Lyricist - Sirivennela Seetharama Sastry

Filmfare Awards South - 1988

- Best Film – Telugu - Ch.V. Appa Rao
- Best Actress – Telugu - Bhanupriya

Cinema Express Awards - 1988

- Cinema Express Awards Best Film - Ch.V. Appa Rao
- Cinema Express Awards Best Director - K. Viswanath
- Cinema Express Awards Best Actress - Bhanupriya
