= Illam (film) =

- Theatrical release poster
- Directed by: I. V. Sasi
- Written by: M. S. Madhu (dialogues)
- Story by: Sreenivasan
- Based on: Sanmanassullavarkku Samadhanam (Malayalam)(1986)
- Produced by: M. L. Govind
- Starring: Sivakumar; Amala
- Cinematography: Jayaram
- Edited by: K. Narayanan
- Music by: Ilaiyaraaja
- Production company: MLG Films
- Release date: 12 August 1988
- Language: Tamil

Illam (transl. Home) is a 1988 Indian Tamil-language drama film directed by I. V. Sasi, starring Sivakumar and Amala. It is a remake of the Malayalam film Sanmanassullavarkku Samadhanam (1986). The film was released on 12 August 1988.

== Plot ==
Mayilsamy is a simple villager hard pressed for money and trying to save his ancestral home. His final hope is to sell a rental property in Chennai and pay of his debts. Saradha is his tenant living with her widowed mother and young brother. Mayilsamy tries to evict them but they are irritated by his rudeness and don't budge. Mayilsamy tries to threaten them through his policeman friend Rajendran, but Rajendran falls for Saradha. Mayilsamy plans to get Saradha married to Rajendran as that will force her to vacate the house.

During this process, Mayilsamy figures out Saradha was in a mental hospital not long ago and confronts her mother about it. He learns that Saradha caused an accident that killed her dad, and she was mentally affected by that accident for some time. The family is hesitant to vacate because of the memories of her father.

Mayilsamy relents and allows them to stay. He goes back to his village only to learn his debtors attached his ancestral home. He goes back to Chennai with his mother and younger sister because he cannot live in his village with the shame of losing his house. He learns that Saradha and family have vacated his rental house. Knowing they have nowhere else to go, he proposes to Saradha and both families can live in that house if she agrees. Saradha agrees to move back into the house.

The movie ends with a tagline hoping Saradha will accept and Mayilsamy as a partner as well.

== Cast ==
- Sivakumar as Mayilsamy
- Amala as Saradha
- Chandrasekhar as policeman Rajendran
- Srikanth as Rajendran's uncle
- Y. G. Mahendran as Saradha's neighbor

== Soundtrack ==
The music composed by Ilaiyaraaja, with lyrics by Gangai Amaran.

Song	Singers
Aadum Paambu	P. Jayachandran, S. P. Sailaja
Manjal Neerattu	K. S. Chithra
Nandhavanam Poothirukkudhu	S. P. Balasubrahmanyam
Puttu Puttu Vaikkatuma	Mano

== Reception ==
The Indian Express compared the film's plot to Veedu: "Illam is unlike Veedu in many ways [..] it does not have anchoring in social factors [..] and is mainly interested in the melodramatic aspects of the plot". Amala won the Best Actress Special Award at the 9th Cinema Express Awards.
