= Sharon Lowen =

American Odissi dancer

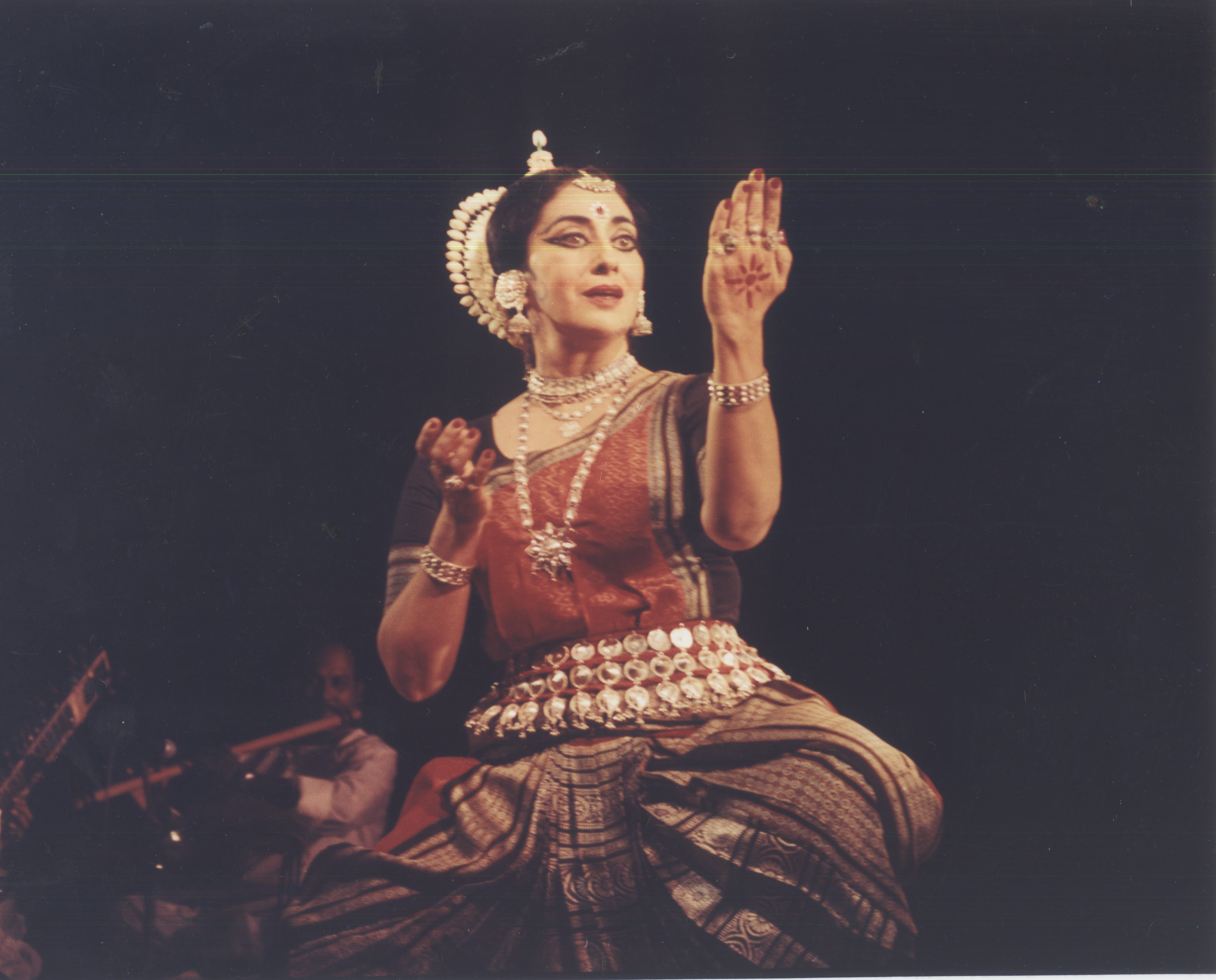
Sharon Lowen in Kumarasambhavam

Sharon Lowen is an American Odissi dancer, trained since 1975 by Guru Kelucharan Mohapatra. She has performed and choreographed for film and television and presented hundreds of concerts throughout India, North America, Asia, Africa, the United Kingdom. and the Middle East. Sharon came to India in 1973 after earning degrees in Humanities, Fine Arts, Asian Studies and Dance from the University of Michigan as a Fulbright Scholar to study Manipuri and later Chhau and Odissi.

== Early life ==
Sharon Lowen grew up in Detroit, United States, where her father was a chemical engineer and her mother a clinical psychologist. She trained in modern dance, Cecchetti ballet and classes at the Detroit Institute of Arts in puppetry, mime and theater since childhood, was a member of the Detroit Puppetry Guild, Puppeteers of America and UNIMA, performed with George Latshaw's puppets for the Detroit and Cleveland symphony orchestras and Jim Henson offered her an apprenticeship with the Muppets which was declined to accept a Fulbright scholarship to India.

Following her bachelor's degree in humanities, Fine Arts, Asian Studies and an M.A. in Education and Dance, Lowen arrived in India on a Fulbright scholarship in 1973 to continue Manipuri dance with Guru Singhajit Singh at Triveni Kala Sangam, New Delhi. With extension and renewal of the Fulbright to 1975, she also trained in Mayurbhanj Chhau under Guru Krushna Chandra Naik, Odissi under Guru Kelucharan Mohapatra, Manipuri Pala Cholam under Guru Thangjam Chaoba Singh and Manipuri Maibi Jagoi under Gurus Ranjana Maibi, Kumar Maibi and R.K. Achoubi Sana Singh. In 1981, her daughter Tara was born.

She has lived and worked in India ever since, achieving success as a foreign-born expert performer and choreographer of classical Indian dance. Throughout her career, she has periodically returned to the United States, performing classical Indian dance recitals around the country during these visits.

== Career ==
She portrayed herself in Indian Cinema, in an award-winning Telugu film Swarnakamalam, to inspire the heroine to value her own classical dance tradition. The film was directed by Dr.K.Viswanath. In the film she performs an Odissi dance and mesmerizes the audience of the film.

From Kashmir to Kanyakumari, Sharon has performed her own choreographies in Sanskrit, Odia, Telugu, Bengali, Malayalam, Tamil, Hindi, Kashmiri, Dogra, alongside her own guru's compositions, including festivals at Khajuraho; Sankat Morchan Hanuman Jayanti, Varanasi; JNU Academy, Imphal; Kottakkal Temple Festival; Bharat Bhavan, Bhopal; Kerala Kalamandalam Diamond Jubilee; Chaitra Parva Festival, Seraikella, Bihar; SNA Odissi Festival, Bhubaneswar; Chidambaram; Konark; Thiruvananthapuram, Shimla; Brihadeeswara Temple, Thanjavur.

Across the globe she has performed concerts, lecture-demonstrations and school performances in the United States, Canada, Mexico, England, Brazil, Japan, Kuwait, Dubai, South Africa, Malaysia, Singapore, Pakistan, Bangladesh, Lithuania, Slovak Republic, Ukraine, and Poland.

In the 90s, Sharon organized six annual Videshi Kalakaar Utsav festivals and Art Without Frontiers seminars supported by the Delhi Sahitya Kala Parishad. She is acknowledged with transforming the recognition of foreigners as classical Indian dance and music performing artists, rather than simply students for the following generations of international artists.

She has choreographed and directed 10 annual Shiv Vivaha Shivratri productions at Khajuraho in various classical dance genres and mime actors, along with Kamalini Dutt and Naresh Kapuria, inspired by the Lalit Suri Hospitality Group chaired by Dr Jyotsna Suri.

Blessed with unerring musicality and keenly deployed technique, Lowen can mesmerize with hands that drift and carve the air like rising smoke. But perhaps the strongest weapon in her arsenal is her eyes, which mirror the soul with convincing depth and grace. In passages of expressive mime, a parade of moods took their turn illuminating her from within, whether she was swooning with the desire of Radha for Krishna or becoming a fearsome warrior incarnation of Vishnu.

— Dance Critic Jennifer Fisher,
on Lowen's 1996 Odissi Performance at Occidental College

Lowen was instrumental in setting up the School of Visual and Performing Arts and Communication at Central University, Hyderabad; served as a member of the USIEF (then USEFI) board from 2003 to 2007.

She is committed to arts education and social upliftment expressed through choreography projects, benefit concerts and consultations for Deepalaya, Akshaypratisthan, Palna, Delhi Police School, and other government and private schools in New Delhi.

She founded the NGO Manasa-Art Without Frontiers with Kamalini Dutt and Naresh Kapuria to conduct, seminars, festivals, lecture demonstrations, classes and performances across artistic disciplines and communities.

== Odissi ==
Her Odissi guru, Padma Vibhushan Guru Kelucharan Mohapatra said of Sharon Lowen in 1986, after accompanying her 22 performance Festival of India-USA tour, "She is now one of my five best disciples who I can unhesitatingly recommend to represent the Odissi dance form anywhere in the world. Sharon has mastered the tradition."

Sharon had the privilege to study with Guru Kelucharan Mohapatra from 1975, and having him present her Odissi and Manipuri performance in Orissa in 1976. He has accompanied her on pakawaj for performances around India and on tour in the U.S. during the Festival of India-U.S.A., and they performed together at the Metropolitan Museum in New York City.

== Mayurbhanj and Seraikella Chhau ==
Training in Mayurbhanj Chhau from 1975 under Guru Krushna Chandra Naik led him to present her in Baripada in 1976 to demonstrate that a woman could perform this traditionally all-male genre and lead to training of women in Mayurbhanj district today. She is the first woman soloist of a previously all-male form, responsible for introducing Mayurbhanj Chhau to the United States at the 1978 Asian Dance Festival in Hawaii and later at the Olympic Arts Festival of Masks in Los Angeles and is singularly responsible for getting Chhau presented on Doordarshan's National Broadcasts.

Her training from 1981 with Guru Kedarnath Sahoo led to the guru including her solo performances during Chaitra Parva, the International Classical Indian Dance and Theatre Festival in Calcutta. Beyond her personal performances internationally and throughout India, Sharon collaborated with Gopal Dubey to create two Chhau ballets combining Mayurbhanj and Seraikella Chhau for Doordarshan National Programs of Dance. Her numerous national television programs from Doordarshan Central Production Centre set new standards of excellence starting with their inaugural program Triveni and later Panch Nayikas of Kalidas.

Sharon Lowen has had an immense impact on Chhau and has promoted its inclusion in arts education, both at national and international levels. Sharon Lowen has been responsible in making Chhau popular in the West, which is making a difference in the awareness of the local history in the regions of Seraikela.

== Manipuri ==
From 1969 to 1972, prior to coming to India, Sharon learned Manipuri from Shrimati Minati Roy and also performed and taught Manipuri for the Indian community and university functions in Ann Arbor.

She taught dance in University of Michigan as visiting professor 1975 and had more than 200 lectures and demonstrations to her credit.

Sharon's main study of Manipur was with Guru Singhajit Singh between 1973 and 1982, and briefly in 1989. She also had the opportunity to study Maibi Jagoi with Late Ranjani Maini, in Manipur in 1974 and 1976.

Sharon had the pleasure of studying under Late Guru Thangjam Chaoba Singh, teacher and choreographer in 1974 and 1976 when he organized her performance of Kartal Cholom at the academy to demonstrate the possibility of adding Cholom to the curriculum for female students.

"Sharon has a mature technique and a fine understanding of the sort of physical and emotional restraint that characterizes Manipuri." - Shanta Serbjeet Singh

== Filmography ==
- Swarnakamalam (1988)
