= Amala Akkineni =

Indian actress

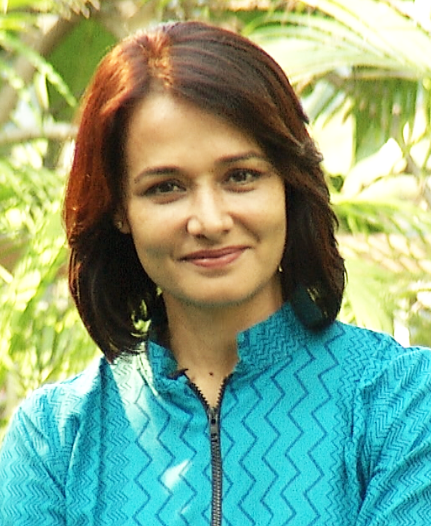
- Amala in 2013
- Born: Amala Mukherjee; Kalaikunda, West Bengal, India
- Education: Kalakshetra, Chennai
- Occupations: Director of Annapurna College of Film and Media; Actress; animal welfare; environmental activist
- Years active: 1986–1993; 2012–present
- Spouse: Nagarjuna Akkineni (m. 1992)
- Children: Akhil Akkineni (b. 1994); Naga Chaitanya (b. 1986) (step son)

Amala Akkineni (née Mukherjee) is an Indian actress, Bharatanatyam dancer, and activist. She has predominantly worked in Tamil films, in addition to Telugu, Hindi, Malayalam, and Kannada-language films. She was a leading actress in the Tamil film industry from 1986 to 1992 and has appeared in many blockbusters in Tamil and other languages. She has won two Filmfare Awards South, namely Best Actress – Malayalam for the 1991 film Ulladakkam and Best Supporting Actress – Telugu for the 2012 film Life Is Beautiful. Akkineni is the co-founder of Blue Cross of Hyderabad, a non-government organisation in Hyderabad, India, which works towards the welfare of animals and preservation of animal rights in India.

== Early life and education ==
Amala Akkineni was born Amala Mukherjee in Kalaikunda, West Bengal, to a Bengali father, M.K. Mukherjee and an Irish mother, Meitim Connolly. Their family soon shifted to Chennai, where she was brought up. She has a brother.

Akkineni holds a Bachelor of Fine Arts degree in Bharatanatyam from the Kalakshetra Foundation, Chennai.

== Personal life ==
Amala Akkineni married Telugu actor Nagarjuna on 11 June 1992 and the couple has a son, actor Akhil born in 1994. She is the step-mother of actor Naga Chaitanya. They currently live in Hyderabad.

She has given many live performances worldwide. She is fluent in English, Tamil, and Telugu and can also understand Bengali.

== Career ==
She was persuaded to join films by T. Rajendar, who visited her home with his wife Usha and convinced her mother to let her act in the film, which would be a classical film featuring her Bharatanatyam dancing. That film was Mythili Ennai Kaathali (1986) which was a box office hit. After the film's success, she acted in several Tamil films such as Mella Thirandhathu Kadhavu (1986), Panneer Nadhigal (1986) and Velaikkaran (1987). She acted with her future husband [Nagarjuna in hits such as Siva (1989) and Nirnayam (1991). She garnered acclaim for her role in the film Ulladakkam (1991).

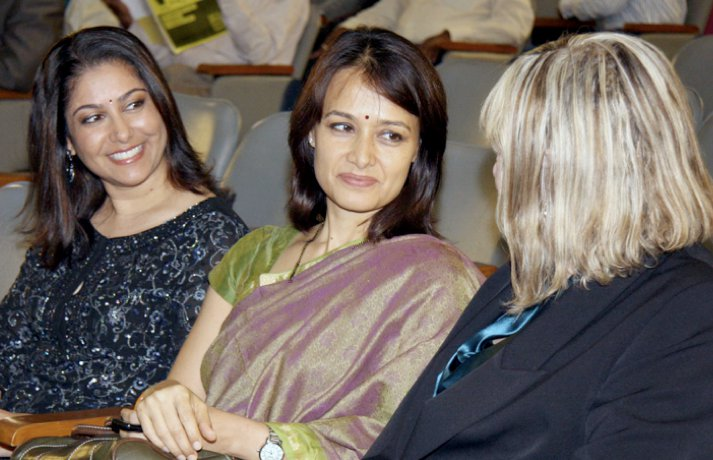
Akkineni at TeachAIDS 2010 India Launch

She quit acting in 1992 following her marriage to Nagarjuna. After a hiatus of 20 years she made a comeback in 2012 with the Telugu film Life is Beautiful. She received a CineMAA Award for Best Outstanding Actress and Telugu category Filmfare Award for best supporting actress in 2013 for her portrayal.

She returned to Malayalam cinema with C/O Saira Banu after a gap of 25 years, since Ulladakkam.

== Filmography ==
Key
†	Denotes films that have not yet been released

=== Tamil ===
Year	Title	Role	Note
1986	Mythili Ennai Kaathali	Mythili	Tamil film debut Nominated - Filmfare Award for Best Actress – Tamil
1986	Panneer Nathigal	Meera	
1986	Kanne Kaniyamuthe	Kavita	
1986	Mella Thirandhathu Kadhavu	Noorjahan	
1986	Unnai Ondru Ketpen	Gita	
1986	Oru Iniya Udhayam	Anju	
1987	Velaikaran	Kaushalya	
1987	Idhu Oru Thodar Kathai	Sumathi	
1987	Kavithai Paada Neramillai	Devi	
1987	Koottu Puzhukkal	Manga	
1987	Poo Poova Poothirukku	Mary	
1987	Vedham Pudhithu	Vaidehi	Nominated — Filmfare Award for Best Actress — Tamil
1988	Sathyaa	Geetha Nair	
1988	Agni Natchathiram	Anjali	
1988	Nethiyadi	Amala	Guest appearance
1988	Jeeva	Geetha	
1988	Illam	Saradha	
1988	Kaliyugam	Nithya	
1988	Kodi Parakkuthu	Aparna	
1989	Naalai Manithan	Preethi	
1989	Varam	Kavitha	
1989	Uthama Purushan	Rekha	
1989	Vetri Vizha	Lalitha	
1989	Mappillai	Geetha	
1990	Pudhu Padagan	Devi	
1990	Pattanamthan Pogalamadi	Unknown	The song "Saamakozhi" picturised for shelved film Kavadi Sindhu was used in this film.
1990	Mounam Sammadham	Hema	
1991	Vaasalil Oru Vennila	Kamal	
1991	Karpoora Mullai	Maya Vinodini	
2022	Kanam	Adhi's mother	Shot simultaneously in Telugu

=== Telugu ===
Year	Title	Role	Note
1987	Kirayi Dada	Lata	Telugu film debut
1988	Chinababu	Madhu	
1988	Raktha Tilakam	Radha	
1989	Siva	Asha	
1990	Prema Yuddham	Latha	
1990	Raja Vikramarka	Rekha	
1990	Aggiramudu	Manasa	
1991	Nirnayam	Geetha	
1991	Aagraham	Chitra	
2012	Life Is Beautiful	Amma	
2014	Manam	Dance teacher	Cameo appearance
2022	Oke Oka Jeevitham	Adhi's mother	Shot simultaneously in Tamil

=== Hindi ===
Year	Title	Role	Note
1988	Dayavan	Sarita	
1988	Kab Tak Chup Rahungi	Geeta	
1989	Dost	Pooja	
1989	Jurrat	Renu	
1990	Shiva	Asha	
2013	Listen... Amaya	Sujata	
2015	Hamari Adhuri Kahani	Rohini Ruparel	Cameo appearance
2018	Karwaan	Tahira	
2023	Tumse Na Ho Payega	Pooja	

=== Kannada ===
Year	Title	Role	Note
1990	Bannada Gejje	Menaka	
1991	Agni Panjara		
1992	Ksheera Sagara		
1992	Belliyappa Bangarappa	Mutthamma	

=== Malayalam ===
Year	Title	Role	Note
1991	Ente Sooryaputhrikku	Maya Vinodini	Malayalam film debut
1991	Ulladakkam	Reshma	Filmfare Award for Best Actress - Malayalam
2017	C/O Saira Banu	Adv. Annie John Tharavadi	
2021	The Fall into Spring	Sulochana Ramachandran	Short film

=== Sound ===
Year	Title	Role	Note
1987	Pushpaka Vimana	Magician's daughter	

=== Television ===
Year	Title	Role	Language	Network
1991	Penn		Tamil	Doordarshan
1992	Sangursh		Hindi	Doordarshan
2010	Super Mother	Judge	Tamil	Star Vijay
2014–2015	Uyirmei	Dr. Kavitha Sandeep	Tamil	Zee Tamil
2019	High Priestess	Swathi Reddy	Telugu	ZEE5
2020	The Forgotten Army - Azaadi Ke Liye	Maya's mother	Hindi	Amazon Prime Video

== Awards and honours ==
Year	Award	Award category	Work	Result	Ref.
1989	Cinema Express Awards	Cinema Express Award for Best Actress Special Jury	Illam; Agni Natchathiram	Won	
1991	Filmfare Awards South	Filmfare Award for Best Actress – Malayalam	Ulladakkam	Won	
2013	Filmfare Awards South	Filmfare Award for Best Supporting Actress – Telugu	Life Is Beautiful	Won	
2013	CineMAA Awards	CineMAA Awards for Best Outstanding Actress	Life Is Beautiful	Won	
2013	SIIMA	SIIMA Award for Best Supporting Actress – Telugu	Life Is Beautiful	Nominated	
2023	SIIMA	SIIMA Award for Best Supporting Actress – Telugu	Oke Oka Jeevitham	Nominated	
2024	Filmfare Awards South	Filmfare Award for Best Supporting Actress – Telugu	Oke Oka Jeevitham	Nominated	
