= Suprabhatha =

- VCD cover
- Directed by: Dinesh Babu
- Written by: Dinesh Babu
- Produced by: Prabha Raj
- Starring: Vishnuvardhan; Suhasini; Srividya
- Cinematography: Dinesh Babu
- Edited by: B. Lenin; V. T. Vijayan
- Music by: Rajan–Nagendra
- Production company: Suryaprabha Films
- Distributed by: Charuhasan
- Release date: 5 August 1988
- Running time: 121 minutes
- Country: India
- Language: Kannada

Suprabhatha is a 1988 Indian Kannada-language romantic drama film directed, written and filmed by Dinesh Babu. The film stars Vishnuvardhan and Suhasini in lead roles, along with Srividya and Maanu in other supporting roles. It tells the love story between a man who suffers from an inferiority complex because of speech defectiveness and a girl, a victim of traumatic experience of sexual assault.

The film was produced by Prabha Raj under the banner of Suryaprabha Films. The film features original songs composed by music duo Rajan–Nagendra. The film was edited by B. Lenin and V. T. Vijayan in their Kannada film debut. Upon release, Suprabhatha met with widespread critical acclaim was declared a blockbuster.

== Plot ==
Vijay Kumar (Vishnuvardhan) lives his life alone in a beautiful valley as petrol bunk owner. He is later joined by Hema (Suhasini) and her brother, Sundereshwar (Maanu) who visits the resort as a hobby to watch migrating birds. On meeting them, Vijay realises Hema is mute and recalls his days when he used to suffer from stammering. One fine day, Vijay's sister (Srividya) arrives with her young daughter and asks him to take care of her while she is out of the town. Hema, on seeing Vijay's plight in handling the kid, decides to do that herself. She soon gets emotionally attached to the kid. Vijay considers himself the perfect match for Hema since he believes that the inferiority complex he suffered due to stammering helps him understand Hema's difficulties. However, soon Vijay's sister arrives back and is shell-shocked to find Hema. She reveals Hema's dark past to Vijay. But when Vijay discovers the truth that Hema pretended to be speech impaired, a lot of secrets are revealed.

== Cast ==
- Vishnuvardhan as Vijay Kumar
- Suhasini as Hema
- Srividya as Vijay's sister
- Maanu as Sundareshwar, Hema's brother
- Vijay Kashi
- Anand Kumar
- Baby Mala
- Rajendra Singh
- Michael Madhu
- BEML Sommanna

== Soundtrack ==
All songs were composed by Rajan–Nagendra, with lyrics by Chi. Udaya Shankar. The soundtrack was hugely successful upon release.

- "Ee Hrudaya Haadide" – S. P. Balasubrahmanyam
- "Nanna Haadu Nannadu" – S. P. Balasubrahmanyam
- "Cheluve Nanna Cheluve" – S. P. Balasubrahmanyam, K. S. Chithra
- "Aralida Aase" – S. P. Balasubrahmanyam, K. S. Chithra
- "Ee Hrudaya Haadide" – K. S. Chithra
- "Cheluva Nanna Cheluva" – K. S. Chithra

== Awards ==
- Karnataka State Film Award for Best Cinematographer – Dinesh Babu
- Filmfare Award for Best Director – Kannada – Dinesh Babu
- Filmfare Award for Best Actor – Kannada – Vishnuvardhan
- Filmfare Award for Best Actress – Kannada – Suhasini
- Cinema Express Awards Best Film – Prabha Raj
- Cinema Express Awards Best Actor – Vishnuvardhan
- Cinema Express Awards Best Actress – Suhasini
