= Mani Ratnam filmography =

Mani Ratnam is an Indian filmmaker who works predominantly in Tamil cinema. Regarded as one of the greatest Indian filmmakers, he is credited with redefining the "range and depth of Tamil cinema". As of 2025, he has directed 29 films, and produced over 15 under his production company Madras Talkies.

Mani Ratnam made his directorial debut, without formal training or education in filmmaking, with the Kannada film Pallavi Anu Pallavi (1983). The critically acclaimed film, which he also wrote, won him the Karnataka State Film Award for Best Screenplay. Then he entered Malayalam film industry with Unaroo, which was based on then prevailing trade union politics. His first Tamil film Pagal Nilavu (1985) was a commercial failure, but immediately followed Idaya Kovil (1985) found theatrical success. The following year, he made the romantic drama Mouna Ragam, which narrated the story of a young woman who is forced into an arranged marriage by her family. The critical and commercial success of the film established him as a leading filmmaker in Tamil cinema. His next release Nayakan, starring Kamal Haasan, was inspired by the life of the Bombay-based gangster Varadarajan Mudaliar. The film was submitted by India as its official entry for the 60th Academy Awards. Later in 2005, Nayakan was included in Time's "All-Time 100 Movies" list. Mani Ratnam followed this with the tragic romance Geethanjali (1989), which marked his Telugu cinema debut; the tragedy Anjali (1990), (Note: The film was India's official entry to the 63rd Academy Awards.) which narrated the story of an intellectually disabled child; and the crime drama Thalapathi (1991), loosely adapted from the Indian epic Mahabharata. In 1992, he made the romantic thriller Roja for Kavithalayaa Productions. The film was dubbed into many Indian languages, including Hindi, and its widespread success brought national recognition to Mani Ratnam. Three years later, he made Bombay (1995), which was based on the 1992–93 Bombay riots. Although controversial for its depiction of religious riots, the film met with wide critical acclaim and became commercially successful in India.

In 1997, Mani Ratnam co-produced and directed the political drama film Iruvar starring Mohanlal with an ensemble supporting cast including Prakash Raj, Aishwarya Rai, Revathi, Gautami, Tabu, and Nassar. (Note: The film was the debut venture of Madras Talkies.) The film was loosely based on the relationship between cinema and politics in Tamil Nadu. The following year, he made his Bollywood debut with Dil Se.., the third film in his "terrorism trilogy". (Note: The preceding films are Roja and Bombay.) A box-office failure in India, the film emerged a success overseas; it became the first Indian film to be placed among the top 10 at the United Kingdom box-office. In 2002, Mani Ratnam directed the critically acclaimed drama Kannathil Muthamittal, which was set against the backdrop of the Sri Lankan Civil War. The commercial failure was the most successful film at the 50th National Film Awards, winning six honours including the award for the Best Feature Film in Tamil. He returned to Bollywood after a six-year hiatus with the political drama Yuva (2004); the project was simultaneously filmed in Tamil as Aayutha Ezhuthu with a different cast. His next release was the biographical film Guru (2007), a film à clef inspired by the life of the industrialist Dhirubhai Ambani. In 2010, Mani Ratnam worked on the Tamil-Hindi bilingual Raavanan/Raavan, which was based on the Indian epic Ramayana. Three years later, he produced and directed the crime drama Kadal, a critical and box office failure. This was followed by O Kadhal Kanmani (2015), a romantic drama about a cohabiting couple. The critically acclaimed film was his first commercial success in the 2010s.

== Filmography ==
=== As director ===
List of Mani Ratnam film credits as director
Year	Title	Language	Notes	Ref.
1983	Pallavi Anu Pallavi	Kannada		
1984	Unaroo	Malayalam		
1985	Pagal Nilavu	Tamil		
1985	Idaya Kovil	Tamil		
1986	Mouna Ragam	Tamil		
1987	Nayakan	Tamil		
1988	Agni Natchathiram	Tamil		
1989	Geethanjali	Telugu		
1990	Anjali	Tamil		
1991	Thalapathi	Tamil		
1992	Roja	Tamil		
1993	Thiruda Thiruda	Tamil	Also producer (Note: He worked as a co-producer with: S. Sriram under Aalayam Productions from 1990-1995; G. Srinivasan under Madras Talkies in 1997 and from 2000-2007; Shekhar Kapur and Ram Gopal Varma under the banner titled India Talkies in 1998; Subaskaran Allirajah under Lyca Productions from 2018-2023; Kamal Haasan under Raaj Kamal Films International in 2025.)	
1995	Bombay	Tamil	Also producer	
1997	Iruvar	Tamil	Also producer	
1998	Dil Se...	Hindi	Also producer	
2000	Alaipayuthey	Tamil	Also producer	
2002	Kannathil Muthamittal	Tamil	Also producer	
2004	Aayutha Ezhuthu	Tamil	simultaneous shots Also producer	
2004	Yuva	Hindi	simultaneous shots Also producer	
2007	Guru	Hindi	Also producer	
2010	Raavan	Hindi	simultaneous shots Also producer	
2010	Raavanan	Tamil	simultaneous shots Also producer	
2013	Kadal	Tamil	Also producer	
2015	O Kadhal Kanmani	Tamil	Also producer	
2017	Kaatru Veliyidai	Tamil	Also producer	
2018	Chekka Chivantha Vaanam	Tamil	Also producer	
2022	Ponniyin Selvan: I	Tamil	Also producer	
2023	Ponniyin Selvan: II	Tamil	Also producer	
2025	Thug Life	Tamil	Also producer	
2027	Inji Vellam	Tamil	Also producer	

Key
†	Denotes films that have not yet been released

=== As producer and writer ===
This is a list of films that Mani Ratnam worked for other directors.

List of Mani Ratnam film credits as producer or writer
Year	Title	Credited as		Language	Notes	Ref.
Year	Title	Producer	Writer	Language	Notes	Ref.
1990	Chatriyan	Yes	Yes	Tamil		
1993	Dasarathan	Yes		Tamil		
1993	Gaayam		Story	Telugu		
1995	Indira		Screenplay	Tamil		
1995	Aasai	Yes		Tamil		
1997	Nerrukku Ner	Yes		Tamil		
1999	Taj Mahal		Yes	Tamil		
2001	Dumm Dumm Dumm	Yes	Yes	Tamil		
2002	Five Star	Yes		Tamil		
2002	Saathiya	Yes	Yes	Hindi		
2017	Ok Jaanu	Yes	Yes	Hindi		
2020	Vaanam Kottattum	Yes	Yes	Tamil		
2020	Putham Pudhu Kaalai	Yes	Yes	Tamil	Anthology film; co-wrote Coffee, Anyone?	

== Television ==
List of Mani Ratnam television credits
Year	Title	Creator	Producer	Writer	Language	Network	Notes	Ref.
2021	Navarasa	Yes	Yes	Yes	Tamil	Netflix		

== Bibliography ==
- Rangan, Baradwaj (2012). Conversations with Mani Ratnam. New Delhi: Penguin Books. ISBN 9788184756906.
