= List of awards and nominations received by Mani Ratnam =

Mani Ratnam awards and nominations
- Ratnam during the shooting of Nayakan
Awards & nominations
Award	Won	Nom
Civilian honours	1	1
Filmfare Awards	4	7
Filmfare Awards South	6	8
International Film Festivals Awards	15	16
Karnataka State Film Awards	1	1
Nandi Awards	1	1
National Film Awards	7	7
Star Screen Awards	1	3
Tamil Nadu State Film Awards	4	4
Vijay Awards	1	1
V. Shantaram Awards	2	2
Other honours^{1}(Political Film Society Awards)	1	1
- Total number of wins and nominations
Totals	44	52

Mani Ratnam is an Indian film director, screenwriter and producer, who is well known for his work in Tamil cinema, based in Chennai, India. He entered the film industry through Pallavi Anu Pallavi, a Kannada film in 1983. The film fetched the Karnataka State Film Award for Best Screenplay for Ratnam. This was followed by a series of unsuccessful films such as Unaroo (Malayalam) and Pagal Nilavu (Tamil). However, it was after Mouna Ragam (1986) Ratnam established himself as a prominent film-maker in the Tamil film industry. The film earned him a National Film Award and a Filmfare Award for Best Tamil Director. Nayakan was released in 1987 and won three National Film Awards at the 35th National Film Awards. The film was India's official submission for the Academy Award for Best Foreign Language Film in 1988 at the 60th Academy Awards; however, it was not shortlisted among the final nominees. His next film Agni Natchathiram was commercially successful and won two awards each at the Filmfare Awards South and Tamil Nadu State Film Award ceremonies. In 1989 he made his Telugu language debut with Geethanjali which received the Golden Lotus Award for Best Popular Film and a Nandi Award. His "Terrorism trilogy" consisting of Roja (1992), Bombay (1995) and Dil Se.. (1998) were highly acclaimed and won numerous awards in India and film festivals abroad. Nayagan and Anjali (1990) were India's official entry for Oscars in the Best Foreign Language Film category. His Tamil film Nayagan along with Satyajit Ray's The Apu Trilogy and Guru Dutt's Pyaasa are the only Indian films to have appeared in Time magazine's All-Time 100 Greatest Movies.

The Government of India honoured Ratnam with the Padma Shri in 2002. Films like Roja, Bombay, Iruvar, Dil Se.. and Kannathil Muthamittal have been screened at many film festivals and fetched him international acclaim.

As of 2013, Ratnam has won six National Film Awards, four Filmfare Awards, six Filmfare Awards South, and numerous awards at various film festivals across the world.

== Civilian Honours ==
Year	Award	Honouring body	Outcome	Ref
2002	Padma Shri	Government of India	Won	
1994	Kalaimamani	Government of Tamil Nadu	Won	

== Filmfare Awards ==
Year	Film	Category	Outcome	Ref
1996	Bombay	Best Film (Critics)	Won	
2003	Saathiya	Best Screenplay	Won	
2005	Yuva	Best Screenplay	Won	
2005	Yuva	Best Film (Critics)	Won	
2007	Guru	Best Film	Nominated	
2007	Guru	Best Director	Nominated	
2007	Guru	Best Story	Nominated	

== Filmfare Awards South ==
Year	Film	Category	Outcome	Ref
1986	Mouna Ragam	Best Director	Won	
1987	Nayakan	Best Director	Nominated	
1988	Agni Natchathiram	Best Director	Nominated	
1989	Geethanjali	Best Director	Won	
1990	Anjali	Best Director	Won	
1991	Thalapathi	Best Director	Won	
1992	Roja	Best Director	Nominated	
1995	Bombay	Best Director	Won	
1997	Iruvar	Best Director	Nominated	
2000	Alaipayuthey	Best Director	Nominated	
2002	Kannathil Muthamittal	Best Director	Won	
2015	O Kadhal Kanmani	Best Director	Nominated	
2018	Chekka Chivantha Vaanam	Best Director	Nominated	
2022	Ponniyin Selvan: I	Best Director	Won	
2023	Ponniyin Selvan: II	Best Director	Nominated	

== Karnataka State Film Awards ==
Year	Film	Category	Outcome	Ref
1982-83	Pallavi Anu Pallavi	Best Screenplay	Won	

== Nandi Awards ==
Year	Film	Category	Outcome	Ref
1990	Geethanjali	Best Story Writer	Won	

== National Film Awards ==
Year	Film	Language	Category	Outcome	Ref
1986	Mouna Ragam	Tamil	Best Regional Film	Won	
1989	Geethanjali	Telugu	Best Popular Film Providing Wholesome Entertainment	Won	
1990	Anjali	Tamil	Best Regional Film	Won	
1992	Roja	Tamil	Best Film on National Integration	Won	
1995	Bombay	Tamil	Best Film on National Integration	Won	
2002	Kannathil Muthamittal	Tamil	Best Regional Film	Won	
2022	Ponniyin Selvan: I	Tamil	Best Regional Film	Won	

== Star Screen Awards ==
Year	Film	Category	Outcome	Ref
1995	Bombay	Best Director	Won	
2005	Yuva	Best Director	Nominated	
2005	Yuva	Best Screenplay	Nominated	

== Tamil Nadu State Film Awards ==
Year	Film	Category	Outcome	Ref
1988	Agni Natchathiram	Third Best Film	Won	
1992	Roja	Best Director	Won	
2002	Kannathil Muthamittal	Best Director	Won	
2002	Kannathil Muthamittal	Second Best Film	Won	

== Moscow International Film Festival ==
Year	Film	Category	Outcome	Ref
1993	Roja	Golden St. George for Best Film	Nominated	

== Edinburgh International Film Festival ==
Year	Film	Category	Outcome	Ref
1995	Bombay	Gala Award	Won	

== Jerusalem Film Festival ==
Year	Film	Category	Outcome	Ref
1995	Bombay	Honorable Mention	Won	
2002	Kannathil Muthamittal	In The Spirit of Freedom Award - Best Feature Film	Won	

== Political Film Society Awards ==
Year	Film	Category	Outcome	Ref
1995	Bombay	Special Award	Won	

== Belgrade Film Festival ==
Year	Film	Category	Outcome	Ref
1997	Iruvar	Best Film	Won	

== International Tamil Film Awards ==
Year	Film	Category	Outcome	Ref
2002	Kannathil Muthamittal	Best Film	Won	
2002	Kannathil Muthamittal	Best Director	Won	

== Berlin Film Festival ==
Year	Film	Category	Outcome	Ref
1998	Dil Se..	NETPAC (Special Mention)	Won	

== RiverRun International Film Festival ==
Year	Film	Category	Outcome	Ref
2002	Kannathil Muthamittal	Audience Award for Best Feature Film	Won	

== Zimbabwe International Film Festival ==
Year	Film	Category	Outcome	Ref
2002	Kannathil Muthamittal	Best Film	Won	

== Film Fest New Haven Awards ==
Year	Film	Category	Outcome	Ref
2002	Kannathil Muthamittal	Audience Award	Won	
2002	Kannathil Muthamittal	Jury Award	Won	
2002	Kannathil Muthamittal	Special Award	Won	

== Westchester Film Festival ==
Year	Film	Category	Outcome	Ref
2002	Kannathil Muthamittal	Best International Film	Won	

== Indian Film Festival of Los Angeles ==
Year	Film	Category	Outcome	Ref
2002	Kannathil Muthamittal	Best Film	Won	

== Venice International Film Festival ==
Year	Cer	Award	Outcome	Ref
2010	67th Venice International Film Festival	Jaeger-Lecoultre Glory To The Filmmaker (Honorary Award)	Won	

== V. Shantaram Awards ==
Year	Film	Category	Outcome	Ref
1992	Roja	Best Director	Won	
2007	Guru	Best Director	Won	

== Vijay Awards ==
Chevalier Sivaji Ganesan Award - Indian Cinema

== Norway Tamil Film Festival Awards ==
Year	Film	Category	Outcome	Ref
2023	Ponniyin Selvan:I	Best Director	Won	
