= Cinema Express Award for Best Director – Tamil =

Indian film award

The Cinema Express Award for Best Director – Tamil is given as a part of its annual Cinema Express Awards for Tamil (Kollywood) films.

== Winners ==
Year	Actor	Film	Ref.
1986	Mani Ratnam	Mouna Ragam	
1987	Mani Ratnam	Nayakan	
1988	Balu Mahendra	Veedu	
1989			
1990	Mani Ratnam	Anjali	
1991	P. Vasu	Chinna Thambi	
1992	Mani Ratnam	Roja	
1993	Bharathiraja	Kizhakku Cheemayile	
1994			
1995	Mani Ratnam	Bombay	
1996			
1997	Vikraman	Surya Vamsam	
1998			
1999	Vikraman	Vaanathaippola	
2000	K. S. Ravikumar	Thenali	
2001			
2002	Bala	Nandhaa	
