= Sumangali (TV series) =

- Genre: Soap opera
- Screenplay by: S.K. Sukimoorthy; I.Ashokan
- Story by: Sathya Jyothi Films; Dialogues; K.Anand Samyuktha; Baba Kenndy
- Directed by: B. Nithiyanandham (1-179); Shiva.K (180-287); V.Sadhasivam (288-400); A.P. Rajendran (400-600); K. Vetrimani (601-672)
- Creative director: T. G. Thyagarajan
- Starring: Aishwarya; Sujeeth; Akshitha Boopiah
- Theme music composer: Ganesh Ramana; Kiran
- Opening theme: "Kaniponnu Nenjatheya"
- Country of origin: India
- Original language: Tamil
- No. of episodes: 672

Production
- Producers: Selvi Thyagarajan; T.T.G. Thyaga Saravanan
- Cinematography: K. Sudhakar; E.Manikandan
- Editors: M. Muthuganesh; B.James; C.S.Rajapradeep
- Camera setup: Multi-camera
- Running time: 22 minutes
- Production company: Sathya Jyothi Films

Original release
- Network: Sun TV
- Release: 6 March 2017 – 12 July 2019

Sumangali is an Indian Tamil-language drama starring Aishwarya, Pradeep (replaced by Sujeeth) and Akshitha Bopiah. It was produced by Sathya Jyothi Films and directed by K. Vetrimani.

== Plot ==
Anu is a poor, free-minded girl who will do anything for people who are right and handles all relations. Santhosh a rich-arrogant business man who is self-centered, haughty and arrogant. At their first meeting he hates Anu. Their lives take a new turn as husband and wife. After marriage, the story is how they both live together.

== Cast ==
Main

- Divya Ganesh/Aishwarya Ramsai as Anu Santhosh / Raja Rajeswari, Santhosh's wife
- Sujeeth as Santhosh, Anu's husband
- Akshitha Boopaiah as Nithya Duraipandi, Santhosh's ex-lover; Duraipandi's widower

Recurring

- Ashwin Kumar as Selvam, Renuka Devi's housekeeper.
- Sushma Nair as Charu, Anu's cousin
- Sri Vidhya Shankar as Nagamma, Anu's foster mother and Nithya's biological mother.
- Deepa Netran as Parvathi, Santhosh mother
- Ilavarasan as Vedhanayagam, Santhosh father
- Purusothaman as Barani, Anu's cousin
- Navin Kumar as Mani, Anu's uncle
- Sathish as Kumar, Anu's foster brotheramd Nagamma's son
- K. Veera as Rajalingam, Anu's uncle.
- Uma Rani as Meenakshi Sankarapandi, Nithya's mother-in-law.
- Santhosh as Muthupandi, Sankarapandi's 2nd son.
- Syamantha Kiran as Vasanthi, Muthupandi's crush and Kamakshi's daughter.
- Veena Venkatesh as Renuka Devi, Anu's aunt.
- Akila as Bhanu, Renuka Devi's daughter-in-law.
- Srilatha as Kamakshi, Vedhanayagam's sister.
- Vaani as Nithya's grandmother
- Jenifer Rechaal as Devi, Anu's worker

Former

- Divya Ganessan as Anu Santhosh / Raja Rajeswari, Santhosh's wife (Replaced by Aishwarya).
- Pradeep as Santhosh, Anu's husband (Replaced by Sujeeth).
- Varshini Arza as Nithya Duraipandi (Replaced by Akshitha Bopaiah).

== Casting ==
- Actress Divya Ganesh landed of Anu
- Later on Aishwarya was replaced for the role of Anu.
- Actor Pradeep was selected to portray the lead role of Shanthosh,
- Later Kannada TV Actor Sujeeth was replaced role of Santhosh.
- Actress Varshini Arza was selected to portray the second lead role of Nithya. Later her character was replaced by Akshitha Bopaiah.
- Actor Ilavarasan was selected to the role of Vedhanayagam (Santhosh Father) and Deepa Nethran was selected to the role of Parvathi (Santhosh Mother) Gemini is joined as Sankarapandi role playing as calm and sadistic villain.
- Divya Ganesh As Anu (Later Replaced By Aishwarya)

== Production ==
The series was directed by K.Shiva. It was produced by Sathya Jyothi Films, along with the production crew of 2001–2012 Sun TV Serials Gopuram (2001–2002), Varam (2002–2003), Anandham (2003–2009), Kalyanam (2009), Idhayam (2009–2012) and Aan Paavam (2012).
