= Mouna Ragam =

1986 film by Mani Ratnam

- Theatrical release poster
- Directed by: Mani Ratnam
- Written by: Mani Ratnam
- Produced by: G. Venkateswaran
- Starring: Mohan; Revathi
- Cinematography: P. C. Sreeram
- Edited by: B. Lenin; V. T. Vijayan
- Music by: Ilaiyaraaja
- Production company: Sujatha Films
- Release date: 15 August 1986
- Running time: 145 minutes
- Country: India
- Language: Tamil

Mouna Ragam (/ˈmaʊnə ˈrɑːɡəm/ transl. Silent Symphony) is a 1986 Indian Tamil-language romantic drama film written and directed by Mani Ratnam, and produced by G. Venkateswaran. The film stars Mohan and Revathi, with Karthik in a guest appearance. V. K. Ramasamy, Ra. Sankaran, Bhaskar, Kanchana, Vani, Kalaiselvi and Sonia play supporting roles. It narrates the life of Divya (Revathi), a free-spirited college girl who is forced into an arranged marriage with Chandrakumar (Mohan) by her father (Sankaran) though she still lives with the memory of her deceased lover Manohar (Karthik). The story follows Divya's inner conflict between holding on to her past and coming to terms with the present.

The film's development began when Ratnam began writing a short story titled "Divya" with no cinematic plans until he finished it. Since production on his directorial debut Pallavi Anu Pallavi (1983) was delayed, he took a break for a month and developed "Divya" into a film script, which would eventually be renamed Mouna Ragam. Although Ratnam began work on the script during Pallavi Anu Pallavi, it languished in development hell and ended up becoming his fifth film. Mouna Ragam was the first film produced by Venkateswaran's Sujatha Films, and was shot primarily in Madras, with additional filming taking place in Delhi and Agra. The music was composed by Ilaiyaraaja, with lyrics by Vaali. P. C. Sreeram was the cinematographer, and the art director was Thota Tharani. The film was edited by B. Lenin and V. T. Vijayan.

Mouna Ragam was released on 15 August 1986. Despite opening to modest audiences, it became a major box-office success, with a theatrical run of over 175 days, and Mani Ratnam's breakthrough. The film received critical acclaim; it won the National Film Award for Best Feature Film in Tamil, and Ratnam received the Filmfare and Cinema Express Awards for Best Director in Tamil. Mouna Ragam also became a breakthrough in Karthik's career despite his role being a cameo. The film introduced techniques such as soft-focus shots, flare filters and backlighting, which became popular in Tamil cinema. It was remade in Hindi in 1992 as Kasak, and in Kannada in 1999 as Chandrodaya.

== Plot ==
Divya is a free-spirited college student from a conservative family in Madras. Her father Chandramouli has planned an arranged marriage for her and tells Divya to come home early from college to meet Chandrakumar, the prospective groom. Uninterested in marriage, she deliberately arrives home late, hoping Chandrakumar would have left, but finds him still patiently waiting. She gives various reasons to make him dislike her but, undeterred, he says that he likes her and agrees to the wedding. Divya initially refuses, but when her father has a heart attack, her mother begs her to accept the proposal to aid his recovery. Divya reluctantly marries Chandrakumar, but he sees how unwilling she is, and they do not consummate their marriage.

Chandrakumar takes Divya to his house in Delhi, but she cannot accept him as her husband. When he asks her what she would like as a wedding gift, she says she wants a divorce, which shocks Chandrakumar. Some time later, Divya tells Chandrakumar about when she was in love with Manohar, during her college days: Divya had Manohar arrested after witnessing him robbing a politician's son. She later learns that the politician's son had run over a girl with his car, and Manohar robbed him to pay for the girl's medical treatment. Feeling guilty, Divya bails him out.

When Manohar meets Divya again, he falls in love with her; although she initially rejects him, she eventually returns his feelings. Manohar is part of a revolutionary group that plans to hold an illegal rally. Divya disapproves, and asks him not to attend; he agrees on the condition that she marry him. On their wedding day, Manohar is falsely accused of participating in the rally and arrested. He escapes and runs to the marriage registrar's office where Divya is waiting for him. A policeman accidentally shoots Manohar, and he dies in front of Divya.

After hearing her story, Chandrakumar tells Divya that he does not care about her past, but the future that he wants to build with her. He tells her to either sign the divorce papers he has obtained, or accept the anklets he bought as his wedding gift to her; Divya chooses divorce. They consult a lawyer who tells them that, per law they must wait one year to file for divorce since they are newly married. The couple is forced to live together for a year.

Having told Chandrakumar about her past and the reason she was unable to accept her marriage, Divya finds herself free from her mental baggage and discomfort around Chandrakumar. She begins to appreciate her situation and make the most of it. Conversely, Chandrakumar is wary of her presence in his life as he fears what would happen once their divorce is approved. Troubled, he distances himself from her and rejects her every move. At the same time, he slowly begins falling in love with her while denying his feelings to himself.

One day, Chandrakumar is attacked by his company's labourers because he had suspended their union leader, and Divya rushes him to a nearby hospital. After Chandrakumar is discharged, Divya takes care of him and realises that she has fallen in love with him. She tries to show it by wearing the anklets he bought for her. But before he can notice the anklets, they enter an argument as Divya tried to surprise him. He asks her to return to Madras and books her trip. Some time later, Chandrakumar notices the anklets and realises that Divya does love him, but the next morning, both continue remaining distant.

Once Chandrakumar leaves for work, Divya arrives alone at the railway station, where she sees Chandrakumar waiting for her. He hands her the divorce papers, saying they were approved that morning. Divya breaks down, telling Chandrakumar that she loves him and would wait indefinitely for him to reciprocate. She tears the divorce papers and leaves to catch her train. Chandrakumar, surprised at Divya's open declaration, catches the departing train, stops it and carries Divya home.

== Cast ==
- Mohan as Chandrakumar
- Revathi as Divya
- Karthik as Manohar (guest appearance)
- V. K. Ramasamy as Chandrakumar's boss
- Ra. Sankaran as Chandramouli
- Bhaskar as Divya's brother
- Kanchana as the lawyer
- Vani as Janaki
- Kalaiselvi as Divya's sister
- Sonia as Divya's sister

Uncredited

- John Babu as a dancer in the song "Panivizhum Iravu"
- Malini Vaman as a dancer in "Panivizhum Iravu"
- Prabhu Deva as the flute player in "Panivizhum Iravu"

== Production ==
=== Development ===
When the last filming schedule for Mani Ratnam's directorial debut, the Kannada film Pallavi Anu Pallavi (1983) was delayed inordinately, he began work on his next script Divya—which eventually became Mouna Ragam, his fifth film. "Divya" was originally a short story about a couple's wedding night that Ratnam did not plan to film, but after writing the story he realised it had cinematic possibilities. Ratnam took a break for a month from Pallavi Anu Pallavi due to its delays, and wrote the script for Divya. For the first time, he was able to write in his native language Tamil, unlike Pallavi Anu Pallavi where he wrote the script in English and had it translated into Kannada. The new title Mouna Ragam was derived from the song "Naan Paadum Mouna Ragam", from Ratnam's fourth film, Idaya Kovil (1985). He considered Mouna Ragam the second film after Pallavi Anu Pallavi to be made exactly as he wanted, in contrast to Idaya Kovil where there was interference.

Ratnam initially read the script of Mouna Ragam when it was titled Divya to producer N. G. John, but the latter wanted a political film, which eventually became the Malayalam film Unaroo (1984), also directed by Ratnam. He then pitched Divya to T. G. Thyagarajan of Sathya Jyothi Films, but Thyagarajan wanted an action film, and Ratnam made Pagal Nilavu (1985) with him. Kovaithambi of Motherland Pictures too rejected Divya, and Ratnam instead made Idaya Kovil with them. The film was eventually picked up by Ratnam's brother, G. Venkateswaran, under his Sujatha Films banner, ending its five-year development hell. It was the company's first film production; until then, it was only distributing and financing films. Mouna Ragam was also Ratnam's first collaboration with cinematographer P. C. Sreeram. The film was edited by B. Lenin and V. T. Vijayan, with art direction by Thota Tharani.

=== Casting ===
Ratnam cast Mohan as Chandrakumar and Revathi as Divya, after casting both of them in Idaya Kovil and Pagal Nilavu, respectively. He initially had "someone like Anant Nag and Supriya Pathak" in mind when he finished writing Divya. Between finishing the story and making the film, he decided to include Revathi, whose performance in Mann Vasanai (1983) impressed him. Nadhiya claims she was also considered for the role, but declined due to prior commitments. Ratnam decided to cast Kanchana in the minor role of the lawyer since he believed "a certain amount of star quality helps" when the character has little screen time but is crucial to the plot. Prabhu Deva, who became a successful dance choreographer, made his acting debut in the film as a boy playing the flute in the song "Panivizhum Iravu", and John Babu, who also became a dance choreographer, appears as the main dancer in the song.

According to Ratnam, the only difference between Divya and Mouna Ragam was the inclusion of Karthik's character Manohar, which was not part of the earlier screenplay. Divya did not explore the girl's past; it only dealt with how she settles into an arranged marriage. Ratnam realised that the story needed to satisfy a wider audience, and decided to give them something that would make them accept the character without questioning Divya's actions, then the film could depict the arranged marriage – two strangers suddenly thrown together – and how they adjust. He originally resisted this, but reconsidered because it provided a clear rationale for Divya's resistance to the arranged marriage. Karthik said he was a last-minute addition to the cast, and described his role as a cameo.

=== Filming ===
Principal photography began at P. C. Sreeram's house in Alwarpet, Madras. The film's introductory credits feature photographs of Revathi from her childhood through her teenage years; her mother gave Thota Tharani the pictures. Although the film was primarily set indoors in Delhi, Ratnam and Sreeram wanted the indoor scenes to look as lively as those shot outdoors. Since the cast was relatively small, Ratnam did not want it to resemble a play and used backlighting for the interior scenes. Tharani found a house in the residential area of Kilpauk which admitted a great deal of sunlight, making it similar to houses in Delhi. To reduce production costs, food for the film's crew was cooked at Venkateswaran's home.

Sreeram made extensive use of frontal and profile close-ups, set against long shots with out-of-focus foregrounds. While filming Manohar's introductory scene, he had to lie on a bed sheet to film. The crew pulled the sheet, with Sreeram and the camera. The scene where Manohar plays a prank on Divya's father (Ra. Sankaran), which later became known as the "Mr. Chandramouli scene", was shot at Tic Tac, an open-air restaurant in Nungambakkam. Filming was also done at Madras' Presidency College, the Schmidt Memorial on Edward Elliot's Beach, and the Madras Literary Society. While filming the song "Oho Megam Vandhadho" which shows Divya dancing in the rain, Revathi tied a handkerchief around her wrist to cover her watch because she felt Divya would actually do that.

The crew filmed in Delhi for two days, and the scenes set in Agra were shot in one day. Portions of "Panivizhum Iravu" were shot at the Taj Mahal in Agra, and those from "Mandram Vandha" were shot at the India Gate. The scenes involving Karthik were the last parts to be filmed, being shot in either a week or two. (Note: In a 2010 interview with The Times of India, Karthik said his scenes were shot in a week, and contradicted this in a later interview with The Hindu, saying they were shot in fourteen days.) The scene where Manohar is killed was shot at the stairs before the Rajaji Hall. In post-production, Mohan's voice was dubbed by S. N. Surendar. The film's final length was 3,987.50 metres (13,082.3 ft).

== Themes and influences ==
Mouna Ragam provides insight into the issues faced by married couples, exploring the plight and perception of divorce, how societies need to view the desires of women, and questions the agency of women. Film critic Baradwaj Rangan compared it to Nenjathai Killathe (1980), another story of a woman torn between the man she loves and the man she marries, Andha 7 Naatkal (1981) and its Hindi remake, Woh Saat Din (1983). Rakesh Mehar of The News Minute noted that one thing differentiating Mouna Ragam from Andha 7 Naatkal and similar films is that it remains focused on Divya. Kumuthan Maderya, writing for PopMatters, described Mouna Ragam as a "chick flick", because like other chick flicks, the film allowed romance to blossom between Divya and Chandrakumar, rather than let divorce separate them; according to him, "chick flicks center on the romantic worldview of females while gratifying their hopes and dreams usually through a warm and fuzzy denouement".

Manohar was part of a group involved in anti-government activities. Rangan drew similarities between his motives and those of characters in the Italian film The Night of the Shooting Stars (1982) and Unaroo. The connection to The Night of the Shooting Stars is referenced when a poster of it appears in a scene where Manohar and his anarchist friends plan an event. According to Rangan, the scene where Divya is looking after Chandrakumar at the hospital reflects her traditional qualities; with her strengths, she is humane and vulnerable. Divya's mischievous nature is shown in a scene where she teaches a Sardar offensive Tamil phrases, which he says to Chandrakumar's boss.

Revathi compared herself to Divya, saying that Divya believes in "living life to the fullest" and she was once like that. Sujatha Narayanan, writing for The New Indian Express, described Chandrakumar as a "patient-understanding-and-poised-at-all-times" man, contrasting him with Manohar who she described as a "dashing, brave and epitome-of-the-word-'dude'". She noted that Divya, like the female leads in most of Ratnam's films, is "practical with strong convictions" and the characters "go through their confusions unapologetically". According to Ratnam, the line "Neenga thottaale kambilipoochi oorraa madhri irukku" (When you touch me, it feels as if caterpillars are crawling on me), spoken by Divya to Chandrakumar, expressed how she would feel on her wedding night.

Many critics have mentioned that Mouna Ragam's background score suits its scenes and themes. According to Martin Clayton, Trevor Herbert and Richard Middleton's 2003 book, The Cultural Study of Music: A Critical Introduction, "Oho Megam Vandhadho" resembled Broadway and MTV styles of singing and dancing, and the main songs combine American music with Indian vocals by S. Janaki. Sangeetha Devi Dundoo of The Hindu considered that Ratnam used rain in the film to accentuate the "childlike, free-spirited nature" of Divya. The sarangi and nadaswaram are used in the music accompanying Chandrakumar and Divya's wedding. In scenes of the couple sightseeing in Delhi, light synth-based music depicts them as modern tourists in their own country. The restaurant scene with Manohar and Divya includes awkwardly played sitar music, indicating the couple's emotions. Spanish music is used for the fight scene when Manohar attacks the politician's son.

The Hindu's Sruthi Radhakrishnan described "Panivizhum Iravu" as "one of those only-80s songs that served as a stand-in for sexual tension, where you'd have two people looking intensely at each other." Raveena Joseph of The Hindu noted that films in the 1980s which featured men stalking women, hoping to get them, were reflective of "the times where romances were covert and such discretion was necessary even in consensual encounters", citing Manohar stalking Divya in Mouna Ragam as an example. The film was Ratnam's first to follow the theme of a person moving to a strange place where they do not know the local language. Divya has a dilemma; since she does not know the language of Delhi, she can barely socialise with local people, and is in conflict with Chandrakumar, the only person with whom she can socialise. Rangan believed Manohar to be the first character in a Tamil film to invite a girl for a "cup of coffee", a form of dating. He contrasted it with Oru Thalai Ragam (1980), in which the protagonists barely spoke. Ratnam replied that although it was not uncommon to invite a girl for a cup of coffee in the 1980s, it was not reflected in mainstream Tamil cinema of the time.

== Music ==
Mouna Ragam's soundtrack was composed by Ilaiyaraaja with lyrics by Vaali. It was released by Echo Records. The film and its soundtrack was dubbed in Telugu, under the same name, whose adapted lyrics were written by Rajasri.

== Release ==
Mouna Ragam was publicised with a shot of Revathi clinging to a lamp post and singing, which Ratnam confirmed as being inspired by "Singin' in the Rain". Before the film's release, a Central Board of Film Certification member wanted it to receive an "A" (adults-only) certificate because the female lead asks for a divorce; after much deliberation, it received a "U" (unrestricted) certificate. Mouna Ragam was released on 15 August 1986, Despite opening to modest audiences, it picked up and became a box-office success, running for over 175 days in theatres, thereby becoming a silver jubilee film. Ratnam considered Mouna Ragam his first commercial success. While the film performed very well in urban areas, it was largely shunned by audiences in rural areas.

== Reception ==
The film was critically acclaimed, especially for its realistic portrayal of urban Tamil people. In a 31 August 1986 review, the review board of the Tamil magazine Ananda Vikatan praised Revathi and Mohan's performances, the film's camera work, music and lack of masala, giving Mouna Ragam a score of 43 out of 100. Jayamanmadhan (a duo) of Kalki wrote that Karthik's presence completely overshadowed Mohan and Revathi while appreciating Sriram's cinematography. The duo said it almost felt like Sreeram had a magic wand instead of camera and also called the screenplay consistent which moves seamlessly but found the story slightly lagging after the intermission and the song set in Agra as minus points. Jayamanmadhan concluded that the relief that one gets after getting up from watching the film would get rid of all the irritants in the film and felt that was enough. Balumani of Anna praised the acting and direction. Kaviya Shetty of India Today wrote in 1994, "[Mouna Ragam] found the perfect formula of a strong storyline and great music, presented in a fresh visual style that caught the audience by surprise".

== Accolades ==
Award (Note: Awards, festivals and organisations are in Alphabetical order.)	Date of ceremony (Note: Date is linked to the article about the awards held that year, wherever possible.)	Category	Recipient(s)	Result	Ref.
Bommai Nagi Reddy Awards	July 1987	Bommai Nagi Reddy Award	Mani Ratnam	Won	
Cinema Express Awards	2 August 1987	Best Director – Tamil	Mani Ratnam	Won	
Filmfare Awards South	9 August 1987	Best Director – Tamil	Mani Ratnam	Won	
National Film Awards	29 September 1987	Best Feature Film – Tamil	G. Venkateswaran (film producer)	Won	

== Other versions ==
Mouna Ragam was dubbed in Telugu and released with the same title in 1987, which was also a success. It was remade in Hindi as Kasak in 1992, and in Kannada in 1999 as Chandrodaya.

== Post-release ==
Mouna Ragam was screened at the 11th International Film Festival of India, the only Tamil entry. It has also been screened at other film festivals, including Mani Ratnam's Love Films at London's National Film Theatre in 2002, a Retrospective of Mani Ratnam's Films at the 2002 Calcutta Film Festival and at the 2002 Locarno Film Festival. An enhanced 5.1 Digital Dolby soundtrack was released in May 2008 by Bayshore Records.

== Legacy ==
Mouna Ragam emerged a milestone of Tamil cinema and Mani Ratnam's breakthrough film. It has been acclaimed for combining box-office success with elements of an art film. The film introduced techniques such as soft-focus shots, flare filters and backlighting, which became popular in Tamil cinema. Ratnam continued using these techniques in his later films, notably Nayakan (1987) and Agni Natchathiram (1988). Mouna Ragam's theme of a person moving to a new place where they do not know the local language was replicated in Ratnam's later films like Nayakan, Roja (1992) and Bombay (1995). It was also Ratnam's first film to make extensive use of staccato dialogue; this became another recurring feature in his later films. The film became a major breakthrough for Karthik despite his role being a cameo, and his "Mr. Chandramouli" dialogue became popular. A feature film, released in 2018 and starring him, was named after this dialogue. The character of Chandramouli became one of Sankaran's best known roles.

According to a Rediff.com article, "The Most Memorable Mani Movies", Mouna Ragam was "arguably the film that announced Mani Ratnam to the Tamil film industry as a talent to watch out for. An excellent script by Ratnam himself, [cinematography by P. C. Sreeram] and a lilting score by [Ilaiyaraaja] made it a hit with both critics and moviegoers". Pavithra Srinivasan of the same website said, "It took a Mani Ratnam to move away from clichéd romantic dialogues and capture subtle nuances that add so much richness to the story, introduce proper, three dimensional characters that lived breathed and sorrowed like everyone else". Deccan Chronicle listed Karthik and Revathi on its "Top 10 Jodis" of Tamil cinema; they "made a fresh pair and were adored by the youth, especially the college students. Their awesome on-screen chemistry in Mouna Ragam was a talking point back then". For the April 2013 centenary of Indian cinema, Forbes India included Revathi's performance in its list, "25 Greatest Acting Performances of Indian Cinema".

== In popular culture ==
Mouna Ragam has influenced countless films, particularly regarding the trope of the bride or groom being reluctantly married. These include Hum Dil De Chuke Sanam (1999), Vallamai Tharayo (2008), Rab Ne Bana Di Jodi (2008), Tanu Weds Manu (2011), Raja Rani (2013) where both the male and female leads have past lovers, Bangalore Days (2014) where the man is unable to forget his past love and accept his wife, and Maalai Naerathu Mayakkam (2016).

Karthi said that his character in Naan Mahaan Alla (2010) was similar to Karthik's "moody yet jovial" character in Mouna Ragam. Sri Divya called Revathi's character an influence on her role in Mallela Theeram Lo Sirimalle Puvvu (2013). Vaibhav Reddy compared his character in Kappal (2014) to Manohar in Mouna Ragam because of their shared effervescence. Director B. V. Nandini Reddy said that the story of a bride unhappy with her husband in Mouna Ragam inspired her to make Kalyana Vaibhogame (2016), where neither the bride nor the bridegroom is interested in marriage.

The scene where Manohar tries to declare his love for Divya through the college intercom in response to her challenge was parodied in Tamizh Padam (2010). Director R. S. Prasanna described one scene in Kalyana Samayal Saadham (2013) where the male lead meets his father-in-law at a café as an ode to the "Mr. Chandramouli" scene. In Master (2021), JD (Vijay) lies about his past but from Manohar's perspective.

== Bibliography ==
- Clayton, Martin; Herbert, Trevor; Middleton, Richard (2003). The Cultural Study of Music: A Critical Introduction. Psychology Press. ISBN 0-415-93845-7.
- Dasgupta, Rohit K.; Datta, Sangeeta (15 December 2018). 100 Essential Indian Films. Rowman & Littlefield. ISBN 978-1-4422-7799-1.
- The Hindu (2000). Students' Britannica India, Volumes 1–5. Popular Prakashan. ISBN 0-85229-760-2.
- Joshi, Priya; Dudrah, Rajinder (2016). The 1970s and Its Legacies in India's Cinemas. Routledge. ISBN 978-0-415-83658-6.
- Joshi, Rajmohan (2006). Environmental Biotechnology. Isha Books. ISBN 81-8205-366-8.
- Kumar, K. Naresh (1995). Indian cinema: ebbs and tides. Har-Anand Publications. ISBN 9788124103449.
- Ministry of Information and Broadcasting (2002). Report – Government of India, Ministry of Information and Broadcasting.
- Rajadhyaksha, Ashish; Willemen, Paul (1998) [1994]. Encyclopaedia of Indian Cinema. British Film Institute and Oxford University Press. ISBN 0-19-563579-5.
- Rangan, Baradwaj (2012). Conversations with Mani Ratnam. India: Penguin Books. ISBN 978-0-670-08520-0.
- Shankar, Subramanian (2 July 2012). Flesh and Fish Blood: Postcolonialism, Translation, and the Vernacular. University of California Press. ISBN 978-0-520-95234-8.
