= Mani Ratnam =

Indian filmmaker (born 1956)

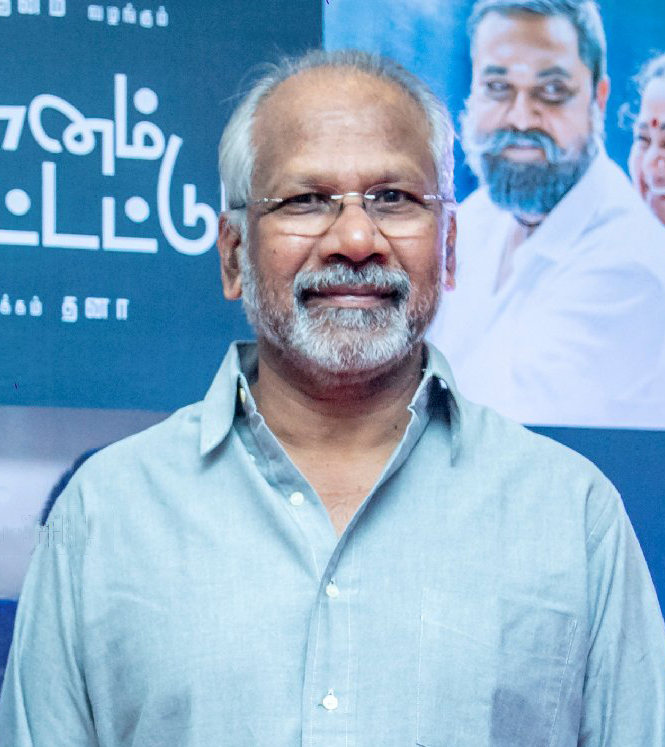
- Mani Ratnam at Vaanam Kottattum Audio Launch
- Born: Gopalaratnam Subramaniam; 2 June 1956 (age 70); Madurai, Madras State, India
- Education: Jamnalal Bajaj Institute of Management Studies
- Occupations: Film director; film producer; screenwriter
- Years active: 1983–present
- Works: Full list
- Spouse: Suhasini Charuhasan (m. 1988)
- Children: 1
- Relatives: G. Venkateswaran (brother); Charuhasan (father-in-law); Kamal Haasan (uncle-in-law)
- Awards: Full list
- Honours: Padma Shri (2002)

Gopalaratnam Subramaniam (born 2 June 1956), known professionally as Mani Ratnam, is an Indian film director, film producer and screenwriter who predominantly works in Tamil cinema and a few Hindi, Telugu, Malayalam, and Kannada films. He is known as one of the most prominent and successful directors in the history of Indian cinema.

He has won seven National Film Awards, four Filmfare Awards, seven Filmfare Awards South, and numerous awards at various film festivals across the world. In 2002, the Government of India honoured him with the Padma Shri, acknowledging his contributions to film.

Despite being born into a film family, Mani Ratnam did not develop any interest in films when he was young. Upon completion of his post graduation in management, he started his career as a consultant. He entered the film industry through the 1983 Kannada film, Pallavi Anu Pallavi. The failure of his subsequent films would mean that he would be left with fewer offers. After working in Telugu and Malayalam cinema, he made his major breakthrough with Mouna Ragam (1986), established him as a leading filmmaker in Tamil cinema which won him his first Filmfare Best Director Award. He was the director of the critically acclaimed Nayakan (1987) and Anjali (1990), both of which qualified as India's official entry for The Academy Awards. He found success with the crime drama Thalapathi, romantic terrorism drama Roja (1992), Bombay (1995), Dil Se.. (1998), and his romantic trilogy of Mouna Ragam (1986), Alaipayuthey (2000), O Kadhal Kanmani (2015).

Each of his films contain its own unique style, with beautifully photographed songs and unique back-lighting. Exploring success in romantic, terrorism war and drama films. His epic historical dramas, Ponniyin Selvan: I (2022) and Ponniyin Selvan: II (2023), based on the Indian epic written by Kalki Krishnamurthy, were critical and commercial blockbusters with the former becoming the 35th highest-grossing film in India and 5th highest-grossing Tamil film.

== Early life ==
Mani Ratnam was born on 2 June 1956 in a Tamil Iyer family in Madurai, Tamil Nadu as the second child of a family that was closely associated with film production. His father, S. Gopalaratnam, was a film distributor who worked for Venus Pictures, while his uncle, "Venus" Krishnamurthy, was a film producer. His elder brother G. Venkateswaran (died 2003) would go on to produce some of his films. His younger brother G. Srinivasan (died 2007), like G. Venkateswaran, would also co-produce some of his films. Mani Ratnam grew up in Madras (now Chennai), along with his siblings and cousins. Despite being a film family, the children were not allowed to watch films as the elders considered them taboo. "As a youngster, films seemed like a waste of time", he claimed in a 1994 interview; however, he started watching films more actively when he was studying at the Besant Theosophical School. During this time, he developed an admiration for actors like Sivaji Ganesan and Nagesh; watching all their films. When he discovered the legendary director K. Balachander, he became his fan. Upon completing his schooling, he graduated with a degree in commerce from the Ramakrishna Mission Vivekananda College, affiliated to the Madras University. Later, he did his Master of Business Administration (MBA) in finance from Jamnalal Bajaj Institute of Management Studies in Mumbai. After finishing his post-graduation in 1977, he was employed in a firm in Madras as a management consultant, and continued to work there for sometime.

== Personal life ==
Ratnam married actress Suhasini on 26 August 1988. The couple have a son. The family resides in Alwarpet, Chennai, where he runs his production company, Madras Talkies.

An FIR was filed against Mani Ratnam and 49 others in 2019 when they wrote to Prime Minister Narendra Modi listing statistics and expressing concern over the rise in communal violence against minorities including Muslims, Christians, and Dalits since Modi's Bharatiya Janata Party (BJP) took power in 2014.

== Film career ==
=== Beginnings: 1975–1982 ===
Mani Ratnam was not satisfied with his job as a consultant as he found it to be a mere extension of his academics. During this time his friend Ravi Shankar, son of director B. R. Panthulu, was in the process of making his first film. Mani Ratnam, Ravi Shankar and another friend Raman, son of filmmaker S. Balachander, worked on the script of the film. Mani Ratnam took a sabbatical from his job to ensure his participation in the making of the film. Being inexperienced, the makers were largely dependent upon the American Cinematographer magazine. The principal cast included Vishnuvardhan, Srinath, Ambareesh, Lakshmi, and Roja Ramani. When the filming was about to begin in Kolar, Karnataka, Mani Ratnam left his consulting job and joined the crew. The film, however, did not take off and was eventually shelved. Nevertheless, he was firm in his idea of becoming a film-maker. Although not impressed with many of the films made in Tamil cinema, he was "amazed" at Bharathiraja's 16 Vayathinile (1977), K. Balachander's Apoorva Raagangal (1975), and Mahendran's Mullum Malarum (1978) and Uthiripookkal (1979). During this time, he befriended a group of people namely P. C. Sreeram, Santhana Bharathi, and P. Vasu, who shared his interest of entering into the film industry.

With a script in hand, Mani Ratnam had an idea to either get a producer for his film or to narrate the script to a "celebrated" film-maker, so that he could get a chance to work along with them and get to know about the various aspects involved in film-making. He chose three directors—Balachander, Bharathiraja, and Mahendran. As the attempts to meet and convince all the three proved to be unsuccessful, he decided to look out for a producer. In the process, he along with P. C. Sreeram—who would collaborate with him in most of his future projects—met around 20 people; however, all the efforts turned out to be unsuccessful.

=== Early years and struggle: 1983–1986 ===
Mani Ratnam developed a script—originally written in English—into a film and named it Pallavi Anu Pallavi. His uncle Krishnamurthy agreed to produce the film but imposed a condition that it should be made under a limited budget in Kannada, to which he agreed. He persuaded Balu Mahendra to do the cinematography as he found the latter's work to be very impressive. He managed to get other crew members B. Lenin (for Film editing), Thota Tharani (for art direction) and Ilaiyaraaja (for composer music), all leading craftsmen in their respective fields. For the male lead, he cast Anil Kapoor after watching his performance in the Telugu film Vamsa Vruksham (1980). Lakshmi was signed up as the female lead. The film explored the relationship between a young man and an older woman. Although an average grosser at the box-office, the film fetched Mani Ratnam the Best Screenplay Award from the Karnataka State Government for the year 1983. After watching Pallavi Anu Pallavi, N. G. John offered him a chance to direct a film in Malayalam. Scripted by T. Damodaran and featuring Mohanlal as hero, Unaroo was about the corruption in labour unions of Kerala. The film was completed within two months and released in April 1984. Mani Ratnam attributed the failure of the film to the conflict of interests that he and the producer had. Following this, he entered Tamil cinema when G. Thyagarajan of Sathya Jyothi Films offered him a chance to direct Pagal Nilavu (1985). The film had Murali and Revathi playing lead roles. It was different from his previous two films in that it included dance sequences and a "comedy track". The same year, he directed another Tamil film Idaya Kovil, a romantic drama. He remodelled a ready made script on the lines of Charlie Chaplin's Limelight (1952). Despite being unsatisfied with the final product, the film was a major box-office success. The phase between 1983 and 1986 was the toughest of his career with only Pallavi Anupallavi feeling satisfactory; the other three completed with a lot of "compromises".

=== Breakthrough: 1986–1991 ===
In 1986, Mani directed the Tamil romantic drama Mouna Ragam, which starred Revathi and Mohan. The film was critically acclaimed for portraying urban Tamils in a "realistic" manner. Specifically, it told the story of the friction between a newly-wed couple. The score by Ilaiyaraaja was appreciated along with SPB in background score and became popular upon release. Mouna Raagam was subsequently dubbed into Telugu under the same title and became a hit in Andhra Pradesh as well. The film elevated Mani's status as a director, and won the National Film Award for Best Feature Film in Tamil at the 34th National Film Awards. He won his first Filmfare Award for directing the film.

In 1987, Mani directed Nayakan starring Kamal Haasan, and the film became a huge success and brought him recognition at the national level. Inspired by the 1972 American crime film, The Godfather, the film was based on the real-life story of underworld don Varadarajan Mudaliar, and tells the story of an orphaned slum-dweller and his rise to top of the Bombay underworld hierarchy. It was included in Time magazine's All-Time 100 Greatest Movies in 2005. Satyajit Ray's The Apu Trilogy and Guru Dutt's Pyaasa are the only other Indian films that have appeared in the list. Indian critics dubbed the film as India's answer to The Godfather. Nayakan was both commercially successful and critically acclaimed winning three National Awards—Best Actor, Best Cinematography and Best Art Direction—at the 35th National Film Awards. The film was India's official entry to the Oscars for Best Foreign Language Film at the 60th Academy Awards, but was not nominated.

Following these two commercial successes, Mani wrote and directed Agni Natchathiram in 1988. The film deals with the story of half-brothers played by Prabhu and Karthik and is notable for its use of new techniques in camera framework, especially during the songs. The film had a successful run in the box office.

In 1989, Telugu actor Nagarjuna and Mani Ratnam collaborated for a Telugu film and it remains the only Telugu film directed by Ratnam. The film Geethanjali which had Nagarjuna and Girija Shettar in the lead, told the story of an ill-fated couple, both of whom are suffering from terminal diseases. Geethanjali was critically acclaimed and won the National Film Award for Best Popular Film Providing Wholesome Entertainment in 1990. In addition, it won the Best Director and Nandi Award for Best Story Writer for Mani. Mani maintained a momentum of making emotional stories of under-served people through the film Anjali in 1990, which starred Baby Shamili as the central character. The film which also had Raghuvaran and Revathy, told the story of an intellectually disabled child who changed the lives of people around her. The film proved to be a commercial success and was nominated as India's official entry to the Oscars in the Best Foreign Language Film category at the 63rd Academy Awards. Following Anjali's release, Mani later made another underworld-themed Tamil film, Thalapathi (1991), starring Rajinikanth and Mammootty. The film was loosely based on Mahabharata, dealt with the friendship between Karna and Duryodhana portrayed by Rajinikanth and Mammmooty respectively. The film met with both critical acclaim and commercial success upon release. Ilaiyaraaja's musical score and Mani's work were highly appreciated as they both went on to win the Music Director and Best Director awards respectively at the 39th Filmfare Awards.

=== National acclaim: 1992–1999 ===
With Thalapathy, Mani ended his long-term association with music director Ilaiyaraaja, bringing in debutant music director A. R. Rahman to score his Tamil classic Roja (1992). The venture was successful, earning Mani various awards. Roja, a romantic film, was about terrorism in the Kashmir region. Starring Arvind Swamy and Madhoo, it was nominated for the Golden St. George Award at the 18th Moscow International Film Festival. It became highly popular, gaining an iconic status in Indian cinema and was dubbed into other languages and met similar success in other regions. Mani took a more light-hearted approach with his next film—Thiruda Thiruda (1993). Scripted by Ram Gopal Varma, the film was a fun filled caper, which was a departure from Mani's previous style and fared moderately well at the box office. Thiruda Thiruda was premiered at the Toronto International Film Festival in 1994.

Mani again teamed up with Ram Gopal Varma to provide the screenplay for the latter's Telugu film Gaayam, a socio-politico film loosely based on The Godfather. In 1995, Mani returned to Tamil language drama through Bombay starring Arvind Swamy and Manisha Koirala, which told the story of a Hindu-Muslim couple in the midst of the 1993 religious Bombay riots and bombings. It was also the first Indian film to focus on marriage between Hindu and Muslim people. The film met with controversy and censorship upon release. It was subsequently dubbed into Hindi where it gained commercial success and appreciation by critics. It won a number of awards, such as Nargis Dutt Award for Best Feature Film on National Integration, Special Award from the Political Film Society, In the Spirit of Freedom Award at the Jerusalem International Film Festival and the Gala Award at the Edinburgh International Film Festival.

Mani produced his wife's directorial debut film, Indira, and then directed the critically successful Iruvar with Mohanlal, Aishwarya Rai, Tabu and Prakash Raj in the lead. Iruvar was awarded the Best Film at the "Festival of the Auteur Films" at the FEST film festival held in Belgrade. In 1998 came the third part of his "terrorism trilogy", named Dil Se.. and starring Shahrukh Khan and Manisha Koirala, with the latter fabricating the second collaboration. It showed the relationship between a young man and a dangerous, disturbed woman. Although they fall in love, she is unable to take the romance further due to her bleak past. The soundtrack album, again composed by A. R. Rahman, gained mass appeal and gave Rahman his next Filmfare Award for Best Music Direction in 1999. Unlike his previous two projects, Dil Se.. opened with little note among film critics and performed poorly in the domestic market, despite being a success overseas. It was screened in many international film festivals, and won the Netpac award (Ex-Aqueo) in the Berlin International Film Festival. The film over the years has achieved cult classic status.

In 2000, Mani directed the romantic drama Alaipayuthey that starred R. Madhavan and Shalini. The film focussed on marriage and explored relationships and their consequences, and garnered critical recognition. It was also screened at the Berlin International Film Festival.

Along with Vasanth, he was instrumental in organising Netru, Indru, Naalai, a stage musical that marked the first theatre production, with numerous other artistes, to aid The Banyan, an organisation that rehabilitates women and children with mental illness.

=== Kannathil Muthamittal and onwards: 2002–2010 ===
Mani's next film, Kannathil Muthamittal, dealt with the story of a child of Sri Lankan Tamil parentage adopted by Indian parents, who wishes to meet her biological mother during the Sri Lankan Civil War. The film was critically acclaimed and commercially successful, winning six National Film Awards, Filmfare Award for Best Direction in Tamil, In the Spirit of Freedom Award at the Jerusalem Film Festival, and an award at the Indian Film Festival of Los Angeles. In 2004, he made Aayutha Ezhuthu, which tells the story of how one incident sends the lives of three youths on a collision course and received positive reviews. Mani made the film simultaneously in Hindi as Yuva, his second venture into Bollywood. Ajay Devgn, Abhishek Bachchan, and Vivek Oberoi replaced Surya Sivakumar, R. Madhavan, and Siddharth, respectively in the Hindi version. Unlike Yuva, Aayutha Ezhuthu was appreciated by critics. Mani suffered his first heart attack while shooting Aayutha Ezhuthu.

In 2007, Mani made Guru, a biographical film based on the life of Dhirubhai Ambani, a business magnate from India. The film starred Abhishek Bachchan and Aishwarya Rai. The film, set in the early 1950s, became a box office success and received critical acclaim. Guru was screened at the Tous Les Cinemas du Monde (World Cinema) section of the 2007 Cannes Film Festival. In 2010, Mani worked on a bilingual film, titled Raavanan starting Vikram, Aishwarya Rai and Prithviraj Sukumaran in Tamil where in the film look was unveiled at 2010 Cannes Film Festival, as part of its marketing campaign. and Raavan in Hindi. The film was released worldwide on 18 June 2010.

The film is loosely based on the Hindu epic Ramayana; its narrative occurs over 14 days when a revolutionist named Veera, who lives in a forest, kidnaps a policeman's wife to avenge his sister's death. The Tamil version received positive reviews from the critics compared to its other versions. The New York Times called the movie a "critics' pick". However, the reviewers of the Hindi version panned the film; Rajeev Masand said it was "a crushing bore of a film, a disappointment on virtually every count" The Tamil version was declared a box office success.

=== Comeback: 2013–present ===
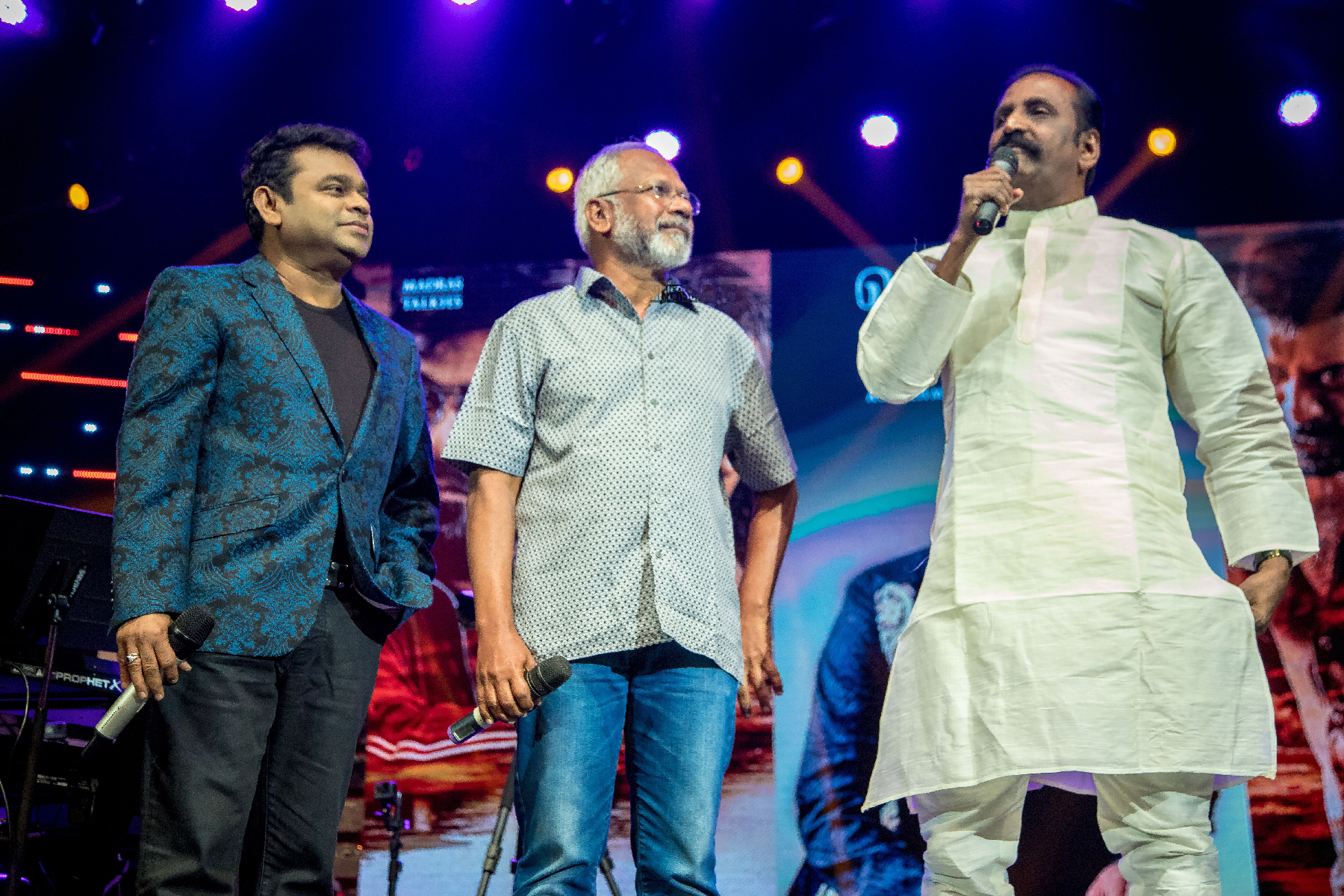
Mani Ratnam with AR Rahman & Vairamuthu at the Chekka Chivantha Vaanam Audio Launch

Mani's film, Kadal was released worldwide on 1 February 2013 to mixed reviews from critics and became a box office failure. Later the distributor of the film filed a police complaint against Mani on account of the huge losses suffered by him.

His next film, romantic drama O Kadhal Kanmani starring Dulquer Salmaan and Nithya Menen as the lead pair, was released in April 2015. The cinematography and editing of the film was handled by P.C. Sreeram and A. Sreekar Prasad respectively, while music was scored by A. R. Rahman. The film depicted the life of a young couple in a live-in relationship in Mumbai, and was said to be a "reflection of the modern mindset of urban India", dealing with issues such as marriage and traditional values. Made at a small budget of 6 crores, the film achieved widespread critical acclaim and commercial success.

His next was Kaatru Veliyidai, starring Karthi, Aditi Rao Hydari and RJ Balaji. The film, set in 1999 during the Kargil War, followed a pilot who, during his time as a prisoner of war, reflects on his failed love life. Kaatru Veliyidai was released in April 2017 to mixed reviews and received an average box office return.

After Kattru Veliyadai, Ratnam's next film was the crime thriller Chekka Chivantha Vaanam, starring Arvind Swami, Silambarasan, Arun Vijay and Vijay Sethupathi as the lead actors, while Jyothika, Aishwarya Rajesh, Aditi Rao Hydari and Dayana Erappa, Prakash Raj, Thiagarajan, and Mansoor Ali Khan rounded out the supporting cast. The film followed three children as they battled for complete power of their crime family following their father's unexpected demise. Chekka Chivantha Vaanam opened in September 2018 to positive reviews and was a box office success. His next project was confirmed to be Ponniyin Selvan: I, based on the Indian epic written by Kalki Krishnamurthy. The film has an ensemble cast consisting of Vikram, Karthi, Jayam Ravi, Jayaram, Rahman, Aishwarya Rai, Trisha, Aishwarya Lekshmi, R. Parthiban, Lal, Babu Antony, Ashwin Kakumanu, Prabhu, Sarathkumar, Sobhita Dhulipala, Vikram Prabhu and many more, play the prominent roles. The venture was jointly produced by Mani Ratnam and Subaskaran under their banners, Madras Talkies and Lyca Productions. The music was composed by A. R. Rahman, while Ravi Varman handled the cinematography of the film. A. Sreekar Prasad was the editor. Initially planned as one film, reminiscent of Mughal-E-Azam, Ponniyin Selvan was divided into two parts. This was done to ensure that the audience would not be confused with the screenplay and story, adapted from the five books of the epic. The first part, Ponniyin Selvan: I, was released theatrically, on 30 September 2022. The second part, Ponniyin Selvan: II released on 28 April 2023. His next film was Thug Life (2025) starring an ensemble cast of Kamal Hassan, Silambarasan, Trisha, Abhirami, Joju George, and Nassar.

== Craft, style, and technical collaborations ==
Mani Ratnam grew up watching the films of K. Balachander, Guru Dutt and Sivaji Ganesan. He is greatly influenced by the film-making styles of Akira Kurosawa, Martin Scorsese, Krzysztof Kieślowski, Ingmar Bergman and Mahendran.

Unlike most of his contemporaries, Mani Ratnam did not assist anybody in film-making prior to entering the industry. A majority of his films are characterised by a string of socio-political themes. Because of his idea of combining art and commercial elements, most of his films garnered both critical acclaim and commercial success. Nayakan, Bombay and Iruvar were inspired from real-life incidents, while Thalapathi and Raavan were based on Indian epics.

Mani Ratnam handled screenplays for a majority of his films. Lauded for his casting in each of his films, he claimed in an interview that "I am not a director who performs and shows. I discuss the role, the scene with my actors and let them bring life to it". Right from the beginning of his career, his works were noted for their technical expertise in areas such as cinematography, art direction, editing and background score. For his debut film, he managed to handpick Balu Mahendra, Thotta Tharani, B. Lenin, and Ilaiyaraaja, leading craftsmen in their respective fields. As his career progressed, he worked with his childhood friend P. C. Sreeram and continued his collaborations with him until Geethanjali. In 1991 for his film Thalapathi, he chose Santosh Sivan and Suresh Urs—both newcomers to the Tamil film industry—to do cinematography and editing respectively. Both would later become a part of his regular crew. While working on Raavan, Santosh Sivan noted "any cameraman can hone his skills just working with Mani" and described Mani Ratnam's films as difficult to film. From his debut project till Thalapathi, Ilaiyaraaja was his regular composer. For his next film Roja (1992), he collaborated with debutant A. R. Rahman, who has been his regular composer for all his films to date. Among cinematographers, he has also worked with Madhu Ambat, Rajiv Menon, Ravi K. Chandran, V. Manikandan and Ravi Varman while switching between Sreeram and Santosh Sivan otherwise. Since Alaipayuthey, A. Sreekar Prasad has been his regular film editor.

== Awards and honours ==
Mani is well recognised outside India with a retrospective of his films held at various film festivals around the world such as Toronto International Film Festival, Busan International Film Festival, Tokyo Filmex and Birmingham International Film Festival. His films are screened regularly at many film festivals such as Venice Film Festival, Rotterdam Film Festival, Montreal World Film Festival and Palm Springs International Film Festival.

The Government of Tamil Nadu honoured Mani with Kalaimamani Award in 1994. The Government of India honoured him with the Padma Shri in 2002. He has won several National Film Awards, Filmfare Awards, Filmfare Awards South and state awards. Apart from these awards, many of his films have been screened at various film festivals and have won numerous accolades. Geethanjali, directed by him won the Golden Lotus Award for Best Popular Film at the 37th National Film Awards. Other films like Mouna Ragam, Anjali, and Kannathil Muthamittal have won the Best Regional Film awards at the National Film Awards. Two of his films, Roja and Bombay have won the Nargis Dutt Award for Best Feature Film on National Integration. The former was also nominated for Best Film category at the 18th Moscow International Film Festival. In 2010, Mani was honoured with Jaeger-Lecoultre Glory to the Filmmaker at the 67th Venice International Film Festival. In July 2015, he was honoured with the Sun Mark Lifetime Achievement Award at the Bagri Foundation London Indian Film Festival for his esteemed contribution to international cinema. Around the same time, the Museum of the Moving Image, New York City, paid a special tribute to Mani. His films Roja, Bombay, and Dil Se were screened at the museum as a retrospective.

The Academy of Motion Picture Arts and Sciences invited Mani Ratnam to join its Directors Branch in 2023.

== See also ==
- List of films directed by Mani Ratnam featuring A. R. Rahman
- List of awards and nominations received by Mani Ratnam

== Bibliography ==
- Nagappan, Ramu (1 December 2011). Speaking Havoc: Social Suffering and South Asian Narratives. University of Washington Press. ISBN 978-0-295-80171-1. Archived from the original on 13 August 2018.
- Thoraval, Yves (1 February 2000). The cinemas of India. Macmillan India. ISBN 978-0-333-93410-4. Archived from the original on 31 December 2013.
- Film. British Federation of Film Societies. 1994. Archived from the original on 12 December 2013.
- National Film Development Corporation of India (NFDC), Directorate of Film Festivals (1988). Indian cinema. Directorate of Film Festivals, Ministry of Information and Broadcasting.
- Chaudhuri, Shohini (2005). "Cinema of South India and Sri Lanka". Contemporary world cinema: Europe, the Middle East, East Asia and South Asia. Edinburgh University Press. p. 199. ISBN 9780748617999.
- "1994 India". India Today. 21. Aroon Purie for Living Media India Ltd. 1994.
- "1988 India". India Today. 13. Living Media India Limited: 96. 1988. Archived from the original on 12 December 2013.
- Gopalan, Lalitha (2005). Bombay: BFI Film Classics. BFI Publishing. ISBN 978-0-85170-956-7.
- Rangan, Baradwaj (2014). Conversations with Mani Ratnam. Penguin Books Limited. ISBN 978-81-8475-690-6.
- Rangan, Baradwaj; Sachidanandam, Aravindh (2014). Maniratnam Padaippugal or Uraiyadal. Kizhakku Pathippagam. ISBN 9789351351573.
