= Pagal Nilavu =

1985 film by Mani Ratnam

- Poster
- Directed by: Mani Ratnam
- Written by: Mani Ratnam
- Dialogue by: A. L. Narayanan
- Produced by: T. G. Thyagarajan
- Starring: Murali; Revathi; Sarath Babu; Sathyaraj
- Cinematography: Ramachandra Babu
- Edited by: B. Lenin
- Music by: Ilaiyaraaja
- Production company: Sathya Jyothi Films
- Release date: 28 June 1985
- Running time: 145 minutes
- Country: India
- Language: Tamil

Pagal Nilavu (transl. The Daytime Moon) is a 1985 Indian Tamil-language gangster film written and directed by Mani Ratnam, starring Murali, Revathi, Sarath Babu and Sathyaraj. It is about a carefree youth caught between his loyalty to a mafia don and his love for a police officer's sister.

The film's score and soundtrack were composed by Ilaiyaraaja which were widely acclaimed, while the cinematography of the film was handled by Ramachandra Babu. Pagal Nilavu marked Mani Ratnam's entry into Tamil cinema. The film was released on 28 June 1985.

== Plot ==
Selvam is an aimless youth in Muttam, Kanyakumari. Out of a sense of deep gratitude, he ends up joining the gang of Devarajan alias Periyavar and complications arise when he falls in love with Jyothi, the sister of Peter, an honest and committed police inspector who is newly posted to the town. Periyavar pretty much runs the town and though he helps people in need, he is a diabolical kingpin who will not compromise on his hold of the town for anything. He wins Selvam's undying loyalty when he helps him with money and power at a critical juncture to save his mother.

In this backdrop Peter takes charge and moves into the town with his sister and daughter. Being uncompromising in his morals, Peter is automatically drawn into a game of one-upmanship with Periyavar and his gang. He also consequentially cannot stand Periyavar's chief henchman Selvam, and is consequentially drawn into continuous verbal and physical duels with him. Selvam meanwhile falls hook line and sinker to Jyothi and tries every trick in the book to woo her and eventually wins.

== Cast ==
- Murali as Selvam
- Revathi as Jyothi
- Sarath Babu as J. Peter Manohar
- Sathyaraj as Devarajan
- Goundamani as George Kutty
- Radhika as Thulasi (cameo appearance)
- Nizhalgal Ravi as Devarajan's eldest son
- Isari Velan as Mudaliyar
- Srilekha Rajendran as George Kutty's wife
- Babumohan
- Venu Arvind as Chandrasekhar (uncredited)

== Production ==
Mani Ratnam and T. G. Thyagarajan of Sathya Jyothi Films were childhood friends as both their fathers were partners of Venus Movies and after the latter became a producer, he was keen to make a film directed by Ratnam. Like with the producer of Unaroo (1984), Ratnam initially narrated the script of Mouna Ragam (1986), then under the title of Divya, but Thyagarajan wanted an action film; the pair eventually began work on Pagal Nilavu. The producer suggested that Sathyaraj should play a character, while Murali and Revathi were also signed on for the lead roles in the film. Sarath Babu and Radhika were also selected to portray supporting roles. As the film was set in a small town milieu, Ratnam felt that he could not do justice to the local dialogues and A. L. Narayanan was drafted in to help work on the dialogues. The film was Ratnam's first in Tamil. Since Radhika's character was a dancer, the actress had to undergo training.

The film was launched at Prasad Studios along with song recording in December 1984. Pagal Nilavu was the first Mani Ratnam film to have standalone songs, which had to be picturised and he shot the videos of "Maina Maina" and "Nee Appothu", one after another. To make the film more commercially viable, Thyagarajan included a comedy subplot written by J. Livingston and Kumar, featuring Goundamani as a Malayali. Cinematography was handled by Ramachandra Babu, and editing by B. Lenin.

== Soundtrack ==
The music was composed by Ilaiyaraaja, with lyrics by Gangai Amaran.

Track listing
No.	Title	Singer(s)	Length
1.	"Poovilae Medai"	P. Jayachandran, P. Susheela	2:39
2.	"Vaidhegi Raman"	S. Janaki	4:22
3.	"Maina Maina"	Ilaiyaraaja	4:23
4.	"Poo Maalayae"	Ilaiyaraaja, S. Janaki	4:21
5.	"Nee Appothu"	Malaysia Vasudevan, S. P. Sailaja	4:24
6.	"Vaarayo Vaanmathi"	Ramesh, Usha Srinivasan	4:33
Total length:			24:42

== Release and reception ==
Pagal Nilavu was released on 28 June 1985, and was unsuccessful at the box office. Ananda Vikatan gave the film a rating of 46 out of 100.

== Bibliography ==
- Rangan, Baradwaj (2012). Conversations with Mani Ratnam. Penguin Books India. ISBN 978-0-670-08520-0.
