= Sathya Jyothi Films =

Indian film production and distribution company

- Type: Film production and distribution
- Industry: Motion pictures and television
- Founded: 1977
- Founder: T. G. Thyagarajan; G. Saravanan
- Website: sathyajyothifilms.com

Sathya Jyothi Films is an Indian film production and distribution company in Tamil Nadu. It was established in 1977 by T. G. Thyagarajan.

== History ==
Sathya Jyothi Films was founded by T. G. Thyagarajan in the 1970s. Thyagarajan, an MBA graduate from the United States, is the son of film producer, late Venus T. Govindarajan, who had made films from the 1960s to the 1980s under Venus Pictures. Thyagarajan initially ventured into film productions under the studio Sathya Movies, production company of his father-in-law R. M. Veerappan before founding Sathya Jyothi Films to make "slightly offbeat films". The first film distributed by the company was the Tamil-dubbed version of Yashoda Krishna. The company's first film as producers was Moondram Pirai (1982).

== Productions ==
=== Films ===
- All films are in Tamil, unless otherwise noted.

Year	Film	Director	Cast	Notes	Ref.
1982	Moondram Pirai	Balu Mahendra	Kamal Haasan, Sridevi		
1985	Pagal Nilavu	Mani Ratnam	Murali, Revathi, Sathyaraj		
1986	Manithanin Marupakkam	K. Rangaraj	Sivakumar, Radha, Jayashree		
1986	Sathya Jyothi	K. Rangaraj	Vishnuvardhan, Sumalatha, Urvashi	Kannada film	
1988	Jeeva	Pratap Pothen	Sathyaraj, Amala		
1990	Kizhakku Vaasal	R. V. Udayakumar	Karthik, Revathi, Khushbu		
1991	Idhayam	Kathir	Murali, Heera		
1992	Endrum Anbudan	Bhagyanathan	Murali, Sithara, Heera		
1993	Vedan	Suresh Krissna	Sarathkumar, Khushbu		
1994	Honest Raj	K. S. Ravi	Vijayakanth, Gautami, Aamani		
1998	Harichandra	Cheyyar Ravi	Karthik, Meena		
2003	Parthiban Kanavu	Karu Palaniappan	Srikanth, Sneha		
2006	Em Magan	Thirumurugan	Bharath, Gopika, Nassar		
2008	Jayamkondaan	R. Kannan	Vinay, Bhavana, Lekha Washington		
2010	Baana Kaathadi	Badri Venkatesh	Atharvaa, Prasanna, Samantha		
2016	Thodari	Prabhu Solomon	Dhanush, Keerthy Suresh		
2017	Sathriyan	S. R. Prabhakaran	Vikram Prabhu, Manjima Mohan, Aishwarya Dutta		
2017	Vivegam	Siva	Ajith Kumar, Vivek Oberoi, Kajal Aggarwal, Akshara Haasan		
2019	Viswasam	Siva	Ajith Kumar, Nayanthara, Jagapathi Babu		
2020	Pattas	R. S. Durai Senthilkumar	Dhanush, Sneha		
2021	Sivakumarin Sabadham	Hiphop Tamizha	Hiphop Tamizha Adhi, Madhuri	Co-produced by Indie Rebels	
2022	Anbarivu	Aswin Raam	Hiphop Tamizha Adhi, Kashmira Pardeshi, Napoleon		
2022	Maaran	Karthick Naren	Dhanush, Malavika Mohanan, Samuthirakani, Smruthi Venkat, Krishna Kumar, Mahendran		
2023	Veeran	ARK Saravan	Hiphop Tamizha, Athira Raj, Vinay Rai		
2024	Captain Miller	Arun Matheswaran	Dhanush, Sundeep Kishan, Priyanka Arul Mohan		
2025	Thalaivan Thalaivii	Pandiraj	Vijay Sethupathi, Nithya Menen, Yogi Babu		
2025	Mark	Vijay Karthikeya	Sudeep	Trilingual film	
2026	Lenin Pandiyan	D. D. Balachandran	Gangai Amaran, Roja Selvamani, Dharshan Ganesan, Shrrita Rao		

=== Television ===
- Anandham (2003–2009) - Sun TV
- Kalyanam (2009) - Sun TV
- Idhayam (2009–2012) - Sun TV
- Aan Paavam (2012) - Sun TV
- Puguntha Veedu (2012–2014) -Zee Tamil
- Maya (2012–2013) - Jaya TV
- Annakodiyum Aindhu Pengalum (2015–2016) - Zee Tamil
- Sumangali (2017–2019) - Sun TV
- Thirumagal (2020–2023) - Sun TV
- Meena (2023–2024) - Sun TV

== Bibliography ==
- Rangan, Baradwaj (2012). Conversations with Mani Ratnam. Penguin Books India. ISBN 978-0-670-08520-0.
