= T. G. Thyagarajan =

Indian film producer

- Occupation: film producer
- Father: Venus Govindarajan
- Relatives: R. M. Veerappan

T. G. Thyagarajan (Thothadri Govindarajan Thyagarajan) is an Indian film producer. He made his debut as film producer with critically acclaimed film Moondram Pirai. He is the founder of the production and distribution company Sathya Jyothi Films. He has produced over 30 films and few television series with the production studio. His father Venus Govindarajan was also a reputed film producer.

== Career ==
Thyagarajan initially produced films with Satya Movies owned by his father-in-law R. M. Veerappan before founding Sathya Jyothi Films in 1970's. His first independent production venture, the Kamal Haasan starrer Moondram Pirai (1982) was a commercial success and was critically acclaimed. The film also won the Tamil Nadu State Award for Best Film. His next venture Pagal Nilavu (1985) which was a maiden collaboration with Mani Ratnam was unsuccessful venture at the box office.

Thyagarajan also produced super hit film Parthiban Kanavu (2003) which eventually bagged the Tamil Nadu State Award for Best Film. He produced back to back 3 films with stars like Dhanush, Vikram Prabhu and Ajith Kumar in 2016 and 2017 titled Thodari (2016), Sathriyan (2017) and Vivegam (2017) respectively. In 2019, his production venture Viswasam became a box office success grossing around 200 crores which was also one of the biggest hit of his career. After Viswasam, Thyagarajan collaborated with Dhanush again with Pattas (2020) which portrayed the Tamil martial arts Adimurai.

== Filmography ==
=== Films ===
- Moondram Pirai (1982)
- Pagal Nilavu (1985)
- Manithanin Marupakkam (1986)
- Jeeva (1988)
- Kizhakku Vaasal (1990)
- Idhayam (1991)
- Endrum Anbudan (1992)
- Vedan (1993)
- Honest Raj (1994)
- Harichandra (1998)
- Parthiban Kanavu (2003)
- Em Magan (2006)
- Jayamkondaan (2008)
- Baana Kaathadi (2010)
- Thodari (2016)
- Sathriyan (2017)
- Vivegam (2017)
- Viswasam (2019)
- Pattas (2020)
- Sivakumarin Sabadham (2021)
- Anbarivu (2022)
- Maaran (2022)
- Veeran (2023)
- Captain Miller (2024
- Thalaiavan Thalaivii (2025)
- Mark (2025)

=== Television ===
- Jeipathu Nijam (1999)
- Gopuram (2002)
- Varam (2003)
- Anandham (2003–2009)
- Kalyanam (2009)
- Idhayam (2009–2012)
- Aan Paavam (2012)
- Puguntha Veedu (2012–2014)
- Maya (2012–2013)
- Annakodiyum Aindhu Pengalum (2015)
- Sumangali (2017–2019)
- Thirumagal (2020–2023)
- Meena (2023–Present)
