= Sundarapandiapuram =

Sundarapandiapuram Swarnapandiapuram
- Town
- A Sunflower field at Sundarapandiapuram

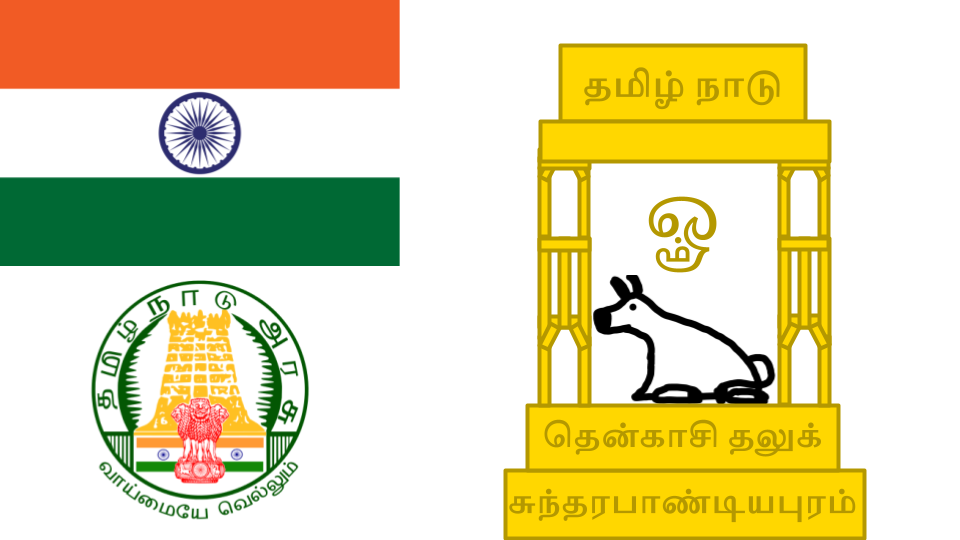
- Flag

- Location in Tamil Nadu, India
- Coordinates: 8°58′06″N 77°22′53″E
- Country: India
- State: Tamil Nadu
- District: Tenkasi
- Taluk: Tenkasi
- Founder: King Jatavarman Sundara Pandyan I
- Named for: Jatavarman Sundara Pandyan I

Area
  - Total: 7.47 km^{2} (2.88 sq mi)

Population (2011)
  - Total: 8,957
  - Density: 1,200/km^{2} (3,110/sq mi)

Languages
  - Official: Tamil
- Time zone: UTC+5:30 (IST)
- Postal code: 627858

Sundarapandiapuram is a panchayat town in Tenkasi district, in the Indian state of Tamil Nadu. It is a setting for several Tamil films and regional sitcoms.

== Demographics ==
In the India census, Sundarapandiapuram had a population of 7,705. Males constituted 50% of the population and females, 50%. It had an average literacy rate of 65%, higher than the national average of 59.5%. The male literacy rate in the town was 74%, while the female literacy rate was lower at 56%. 11% of the population was under 6 years of age.

By the 2011 census, the town had grown to 8,957 inhabitants.

== Economy ==
The main economy of this village is farming and cattle farming. The main crops are rice paddy, sunflower seeds, green chilly, onion, and coconut farming. Cattle farming involves food requirements like milk and another for labour purposes like ploughing, irrigation, etc.

== In popular culture ==
The critically and commercially successful Tamil movie Roja was also shot here. Later, many films have been produced in this area, such as Karuthamma, Vetri Kodi Kattu, Gentleman, Mudhalvan, Anniyan, Satyam, Sivapathikaram, Vettai, Avan Ivan, Dharmadurai, Seema Raja, Vedi, Sindubadh, Pushpa and many more.

== Temples ==
Shri Muppudathi Amman Temple - ???

Shri Sivan Temple - 1887

Sri RajaGopala Swamy Temple - 1200s - 1400s

== Government ==
The town board contains one member from each community and together they elect a president of the town.
