= Endrum Anbudan =

1992 film by R. Bhagyanathan

- Theatrical release poster
- Directed by: R. Bhagyanathan
- Written by: R. Bhagyanathan
- Produced by: G. Saravanan; T. G. Thyagarajan
- Starring: Murali; Sithara; Heera Rajagopal
- Cinematography: M. S. Annadurai
- Edited by: Anil Malnad
- Music by: Ilaiyaraaja
- Production company: Sathya Jyothi Films
- Release date: 14 August 1992
- Country: India
- Language: Tamil

Endrum Anbudan (transl. Always with love) is a 1992 Indian Tamil-language drama film written and directed by R. Bhagyanathan in his debut. The film stars Murali, Sithara and Heera Rajagopal, with Manorama, Janagaraj and Chinni Jayanth in supporting roles. It was released on 14 August 1992.

== Cast ==
- Murali as Thyagu
- Sithara as Nandhini
- Heera Rajagopal as Jennifer
- Manorama
- Janagaraj as Venkatachalam
- Chinni Jayanth as Ashok
- Charle as Munsamy
- Senthil as Estry
- Baby Monisha as Mallu
- Mohan Raman as Nandhini's father
- Chandrasekhar (guest appearance)

== Production ==
Endrum Anbudan is the writing and directorial debut of R. Bhagyanathan, who earlier assisted K. Bhagyaraj.

== Soundtrack ==
The soundtrack was composed by Ilaiyaraaja.

Track listing
No.	Title	Lyrics	Singer(s)	Length
1.	"Chinnanjiru Annakili"	Vaali	S. P. Balasubrahmanyam
2.	"Thulli Thirnthoru"	R. Bhagyanathan	S. P. Balasubrahmanyam
3.	"Manjal Vayieal"	Piraisoodan	Mano
4.	"Nillavu Vandhadu"	Vaali	Mano, S. Janaki
5.	"Power Pochedah"	Vaali	Mano

== Release and reception ==
Endrum Anbudan was released on 14 August 1992. Ayyappa Prasad of The Indian Express wrote "Endrum Anbudan has a very interesting storyline ably directed and scripted by Bhagyanathan (debut) with excellent performances by Sitara and Murali in lead roles". C. R. K. of Kalki wrote the film had near perfect incidents, strong dialogues with complete subtlety but with inclusion of two fight scenes.
