= Iruvar =

- Poster
- Directed by: Mani Ratnam
- Written by: Mani Ratnam
- Dialogues by: Suhasini
- Poem by: Vairamuthu
- Produced by: Mani Ratnam; G. Srinivasan
- Starring: Mohanlal; Prakash Raj; Aishwarya Rai; Revathi; Tabu; Gautami
- Cinematography: Santosh Sivan
- Edited by: Suresh Urs
- Music by: A. R. Rahman
- Production company: Madras Talkies
- Distributed by: Madras Talkies
- Release date: 14 January 1997
- Running time: 158 minutes
- Country: India
- Language: Tamil

Iruvar (transl. The Duo) is a 1997 Indian Tamil-language epic political drama film co-written, produced, and directed by Mani Ratnam. The music was composed by A. R. Rahman. The film, inspired by the lives of M. G. Ramachandran, M. Karunanidhi and J. Jayalalithaa, is set against the backdrop of cinema and politics in Tamil Nadu. It stars Mohanlal with an ensemble supporting cast including Prakash Raj, Aishwarya Rai, Revathi, Gautami, Tabu, and Nassar. Rai, who was crowned Miss World 1994, made her first screen appearance, playing dual characters.

The high-budget film had its original soundtrack composed by A. R. Rahman, and the cinematography was by Santosh Sivan. The film marked Mohanlal's debut in Tamil cinema after having only a cameo in Gopura Vasalile.

Iruvar was the first Tamil film to be screened at the Academy Museum of Motion Pictures on 19 April 2025 and was also screened at the Masters section in the 1997 Toronto International Film Festival. The film won the Best Film award at the Belgrade International Film Festival and two National Film Awards. In 2012, Iruvar was included by critic Rachel Dwyer in the 2012 British Film Institute Sight & Sound 1000 greatest films of all time. In a 2013 interview, Ratnam said he considered Iruvar to be his best film. It used DTS 6 track sound recording.

== Plot ==
In the late 1940s Madras, Anandan is a charismatic but struggling actor attempting to break into the Tamil film industry. He meets Tamizhselvan, an eloquent, rationalist writer steeped in Dravidian ideology. Impressed by Tamizhselvan's flowery prose, Anandan delivers an audition that secures him the lead role in an upcoming feature film. Tamizhselvan introduces Anandan to Ayya Veluthambi, the venerable leader of a rising Dravidian political party. Anandan aligns with the party's socialist principles, and the two friends marry their respective village suitors: Anandan marries Pushpavalli, while Tamizhselvan marries Maragatham. However, upon returning to Madras, financial issues abruptly halt Anandan's film production. Over the next few months, while Tamizhselvan's party grows into the primary political opposition, Anandan is reduced to minor acting roles. Facing poverty, he sends a pregnant Pushpavalli back to her village. Shortly after, Pushpavalli dies from a sudden illness, leaving a despondent Anandan to be consoled by Tamizhselvan.

Weeks later, Anandan’s fortunes shift when he is re-offered a lead protagonist role. He insists the director hire Tamizhselvan as the screenwriter. The film is a monumental success, transforming Anandan into a cinematic icon and a massive cultural celebrity. Recognizing his immense star power, Tamizhselvan encourages Anandan to campaign for the party. During this period, Anandan marries Ramani, a fellow actress whom he rescues from her abusive family. Years later, as a general election approaches, Veluthambi requests that Anandan contest a legislative seat to leverage his mass appeal. Tamizhselvan privately objects, believing veteran party workers are more deserving of the candidacy, sowing the first seeds of friction between the friends.

During a film shoot, Anandan is accidentally shot in the neck with a prop gun, triggering a massive wave of public sympathy that helps the party sweep the state elections. Veluthambi declines the office of Chief Minister, tasking Anandan and senior leader Madhivannan with selecting the premier. Though resentful of being sidelined by Veluthambi, Tamizhselvan is ultimately appointed Chief Minister with Anandan's wholehearted public endorsement. Later, Anandan requests the Health Minister portfolio in the new cabinet. Tamizhselvan refuses, citing a party rule that prohibits cabinet ministers from continuing active film careers, offering Anandan any portfolio on the condition that he retire from acting. Reluctant to abandon cinema, Anandan declines. Concurrently, Tamizhselvan enters into a passionate relationship with Senthamarai, an idealistic admirer of his political protests, who becomes his second wife.

Anandan's next film features Kalpana, a vibrant young actress who bears an uncanny resemblance to his late first wife, Pushpavalli. Though initially distant, Anandan is drawn to her, but his hesitation to commit to a third marriage causes a frustrated Kalpana to sever ties and leave the industry. Following the death of Veluthambi, the underlying tension between the two men explodes at a memorial service, where Anandan publicly accuses Tamizhselvan's administration of institutional corruption. In retaliation, Tamizhselvan expels Anandan from the party. The expulsion causes a factional split, prompting Anandan to launch a rival political party.

Over the next four years, Anandan uses his films as powerful propaganda tools to expose the government's failings, ultimately defeating Tamizhselvan in the next election to become Chief Minister. However, Anandan's administration proves equally susceptible to bureaucratic inefficiencies. Tamizhselvan utilizes his formidable oratorical skills to incite widespread public protests against Anandan's government. With a heavy heart, Anandan orders his former friend's arrest to maintain public order. Meanwhile, Anandan spots Kalpana working at a flood relief camp and sends a vehicle to fetch her; tragic circumstances intervene when the car crashes, killing Kalpana instantly and leaving Anandan emotionally devastated.

Anandan's health rapidly deteriorates under the weight of personal grief and political pressure. At the wedding of Veluthambi's granddaughter, a visibly frail Anandan encounters Tamizhselvan; the two share a poignant, silent handshake. The following morning, Ramani discovers that Anandan has died peacefully in his sleep. Confronted by the loss of his lifelong brother-in-arms, a grieving Tamizhselvan visits a historic ruin where they had once envisioned their shared future, delivering a poignant, private monologue in verse to mourn the passing of his greatest friend and rival.

== Cast ==
- Mohanlal as Anandan, a superstar actor, who later becomes the Chief Minister of Tamil Nadu
- Prakash Raj as Tamizhselvan, the former Chief Minister of Tamil Nadu and current opposition leader
- Aishwarya Rai as Pushpavalli and Kalpana
- Gautami as Ramani
- Revathi as Maragatham
- Tabu as Senthamarai
- Nassar as Ayya Veluthambi
- Kaka Radhakrishnan as Kasshi
- Major Sundarrajan as Police Officer
- Rajesh as Madhivanan
- Delhi Ganesh as Nambi
- Nizhalgal Ravi as Ramani's uncle
- Kalpana Iyer as Annamal, Anandan's mother
- S. N. Lakshmi as Tamizhselvan's mother
- Gowtham Sundararajan as Elango
- C. K. Saraswathi
- P. L. Narayana as Ramasamy
- Laxmi Rattan as Arjun Doss
- Sujitha as Tamizhselvan's daughter
- Vishnuvardhan as Tamizhselvan's son
- Krishna as Tamizhselvan's son
- Monica as Manimegalai, Tamizhselvan's daughter
- Cheenu Mohan as Assistant director
- Madhoo in a special appearance in song "Narumugaye"

== Production ==
=== Development ===
In October 1995, Mani Ratnam announced that he was set to make a feature film titled Anandan featuring dialogue written by his wife Suhasini and starring Mohanlal, Nana Patekar, and Aishwarya Rai. Initial speculation suggested that the film would visualise the duel between Velupillai Prabhakaran and his former Liberation Tigers of Tamil Eelam deputy Mahattaya, who was executed in 1995 for an alleged plot to kill his mentor, with Aishwarya Rai reported to be playing Indira Gandhi. Mani Ratnam was quick to deny any political backdrop claiming that the film would be about the Indian movie industry; however, this proved to bluff the public as the film was to be set within a political canvas. The film was later retitled Iruvar (The Duo). The idea to make a film on the lives of 1980s Tamil Nadu political icons M. G. Ramachandran and M. Karunanidhi and their influential relationship between Tamil cinema and Dravidian politics was sparked off by a conversation Mani Ratnam had with renowned Malayalam author, M. T. Vasudevan Nair.

=== Casting ===
When interviewed about the difficulties of casting, Mani Ratnam revealed he "struggled" citing that casting "is most important as far as performance is concerned" and that "fifty per cent of the job is done if you cast correctly". Mohanlal was approached to play Anandan, a character inspired by M. G. Ramachandran and about his performance in the film, Ratnam claimed that Mohanlal had "the ability to make everything absolutely realistic with the least amount of effort". He described that debutant Aishwarya Rai, the former Miss World beauty pageant winner, who appeared in two different characters—one inspired by actress-politician J. Jayalalithaa—as a "tremendous dancer" and as "having a lot of potential". The director revealed that the only difficulty Mohanlal and Rai had was the language, with both being non-Tamil speakers, adding that the pair had to work hard over the dubbing trying to get as close to the Tamil tongue as possible. Tabu was also signed to play an important role in the film and shot for Iruvar alongside her Tamil debut film, Kadhal Desam.

The actor to play the role of Tamizhselvan, inspired by Karunanidhi, took substantially longer to finalise with the initial choice, Nana Patekar, withdrawing after several discussions about his remuneration. Later, Mammootty was offered the role but declined, as did Kamal Haasan and Sathyaraj. Negotiations with R. Sarathkumar failed as he demanded a higher remuneration, and Mithun Chakraborty declined as the required looks would have affected his other film commitments. Arvind Swamy was later signed on, but soon opted out after a look test, as he could not cut his hair for the role, which would have caused continuity problems for his commitment to Minsara Kanavu and Pudhayal (1997). Ratnam called R. Madhavan, then a small-time model, for the screen test, but left him out of the project citing that he thought his eyes looked too young for a senior role. Subsequently, Prakash Raj, who had played a small role in Ratnam's Bombay (1995), was signed up. Prakash Raj initially told Ratnam that he was unprepared to essay such a delicate role on such short notice, with Prakash Raj later revealing that Ratnam nurtured the character and brought self-confidence into the actor.

=== Filming ===
The film was shot in 1996 and schedules were canned all across India from Kerala to Leh with Mohanlal stating that it was the longest duration he had shot for a film. To ensure perfection, Ratnam made Prakash Raj take 25 takes for his first shot, lasting over six hours. After the shooting for Iruvar was completed, Mani Ratnam asked Prakash Raj to dub in Tamil himself for the first time, with his work taking four days to complete.

== Soundtrack ==
The soundtrack was composed by A. R. Rahman. It has songs ranging from pure Carnatic to Tamil folk and jazz. Rahman blended two Carnatic ragas—Naattai and Gambheera Naattai—in "Narumugaye". "Vennila Vennila" and "Hello Mister Edhirkatchi" are based on jazz music. Rahman sampled Dave Grusin's "Memphis Stomp" for the intro of "Hello Mister Edhirkatchi". "Udal Mannukku" and "Unnodu Naan Irundha" were recitals by Arvind Swamy. Vishwa Mohan Bhatt also worked on the album, playing the Mohan veena upon Rahman's invitation.

All lyrics are written by Vairamuthu.

Iruvar (Tamil)
No.	Title	Singer(s)	Length
1.	"Ayirathil Naan Oruvan"	Mano, A. R. Rahman (backing vocals)	5:51
2.	"Narumugaye"	P. Unnikrishnan, Bombay Jayashri	6:20
3.	"Kannai Kattikolathey"	Hariharan, A. R. Rahman	5:10
4.	"Vennila Vennila"	Asha Bhosle	4:59
5.	"Hello Mister Edhirkatchi"	Harini, Rajagopal	4:12
6.	"Pookodiyin Punnagai"	Sandhya Jayakrishna	5:31
7.	"Udal Mannuku"	Arvind Swamy	2:54
8.	"Unnodu Naan Irundha"	Arvind Swamy	2:35

All lyrics are written by Veturi, except where noted.

Iddaru (Telugu)
No.	Title	Singer(s)	Length
1.	"Aadhukonadam Vratha Mai"	Mano	5:51
2.	"Sasivadane"	P. Unnikrishnan, Bombay Jayashri	6:22
3.	"Kallagganthalu Kattadhoi"	Hariharan	5:56
4.	"Vennelaa"	Asha Bhosle	4:58
5.	"Hello Mister Edurpakshi" (Lyrics:Sirivennela Seetharama Sastry)	Harini, Rajagopal	4:13
6.	"Poonagave"	Sandhya Jayakrishna	5:31
7.	"Odalu Mannanta"	Mano	2:54
8.	"Unnanu Neeku Thodugaa"	S. P. Balasubrahmanyam, Dominique Cerejo	2:36

== Release ==
The Central Board of Film Certification panel saw the film on 31 December 1996 and opined that various characters in the film reflected the personal lives of some politicians and accordingly a certificate was denied. Following the producer's protest, it was seen by an eight-member revising committee on 2 January 1997 which suggested deletion of some objectionable portions and cleared the film for U/A certification. Four dialogues from the film were subsequently cut. However the objected scenes were muted with a background playing rather than a complete muting of the scenes.

Two days before the release of the film, Dravidar Kazhagam president K. Veeramani threatened to mobilise public against its screening in theatres, because he felt that it contained "objectionable" footage denigrating the Dravidian movement founded by Periyar. The politician threatened legal action if the film was screened in theatres without removing what he perceived as the "offending" portion, but Mani Ratnam dismissed that Veeramani was making rushed conclusions without having seen the film. The film's box office performance was also hampered by the fallout from the FEFSI strike of 1997.

A month after the film's release in February 1997, the regional chief of the censor board G. Rajasekaran brought up the issue again and referred the film to the Indian Home Office for "advice", threatening that if more scenes were not deleted, it might ultimately lead to a law and order problem. The film was dubbed in Telugu under the title Iddaru and in Malayalam under the same name.

== Reception ==
The film received positive reviews from critics including by reviewers in Kalki, The Hindu, and the Edmonton Sun.

== Controversy ==
Both M. Karunanidhi and J. Jayalalithaa denied the relevance of the film to their lives and never admitted to the film being a biopic.

== Legacy ==
Mani Ratnam named Iruvar as his best film in an interview with critic Baradwaj Rangan. Rangan also named the film the best work of Mani Ratnam, in his list “All Mani Ratnam Movies Ranked”.

The film was also noted for its vignette style of making, with many single-shot scenes, where a fluid camera setup captures the entire action.

== Accolades ==
National Film Awards 1997

- Best Supporting Actor – Prakash Raj
- Best Cinematography – Santosh Sivan

International honours

- Belgrade International Film Festival – Best Film in the Festival of the Auteur Films
- Toronto International Film Festival – Masters section

== See also ==
- Film à clef

== Bibliography ==
- Dhananjayan, G. (2014). Pride of Tamil Cinema: 1931–2013. Blue Ocean Publishers. OCLC 898765509.
- Rangan, Baradwaj (2012). Conversations with Mani Ratnam. India: Penguin Books. ISBN 978-0-670-08520-0.
