= Anjali (1990 film) =

1990 film by Mani Ratnam

- Theatrical release poster
- Directed by: Mani Ratnam
- Written by: Mani Ratnam
- Produced by: G. Venkateswaran
- Starring: Raghuvaran; Revathi; Shamili
- Cinematography: Madhu Ambat
- Edited by: B. Lenin; V. T. Vijayan
- Music by: Ilaiyaraaja
- Production company: Sujatha Productions
- Distributed by: GV Films
- Release date: 12 July 1990
- Running time: 155 minutes
- Country: India
- Language: Tamil

Anjali is a 1990 Indian Tamil-language children's drama film written and directed by Mani Ratnam. It stars Raghuvaran and Revathi, with Tarun, Shruti and Shamili in supporting roles. The film deals with the story of a dying mentally disabled child, and the emotional trauma experienced by her family.

Anjali was released on 12 July 1990 and was critically acclaimed, winning three National Film Awards, and was also featured at the 14th International Film Festival of India in the Indian Panorama section. Anjali was chosen as India's official entry to the Oscars in 1991, but was not nominated.

== Plot ==
Shekar, a civil engineer, and his wife, Chitra, live in a suburban housing colony with their two young children, Arjun and Anu. The couple previously suffered the loss of their third child, a daughter, who was reported to have been stillborn. Two years later, the family has seemingly recovered from the tragedy. Arjun and Anu initially clash with the other children in the housing society but are eventually accepted into the tight-knit peer group. The neighborhood children spend most of their time pulling harmless pranks on the residents, fearing only Dennis Joseph, a reclusive ex-convict living in the complex.

The family dynamic becomes strained when Chitra and the children visit Shekar’s construction site to surprise him, only to learn he has abruptly left for an unannounced personal emergency. That evening, Shekar claims he was working at the site all day. Though hurt by the deception, Chitra dismisses her suspicions. On New Year's Eve, while Shekar is ostensibly away on an official business trip, Arjun slips out to celebrate with his friends. During the festivities, Arjun spots his father in public with an unknown woman. Later that night, the police apprehend the children and return them to their parents. When Chitra requests that a returned Shekar discipline Arjun, the boy exposes his father's actions. Shekar vehemently denies having an affair, defusing the tension by swearing an oath on his children's lives.

A few days later, Chitra and the children spot Shekar in public with the same woman. Confronting him, a devastated Chitra refuses to listen to his explanations and prepares to leave him. Desperate, Shekar discloses the truth: their third child, Anjali, did not die at birth. Instead, she survived but sustained a severe hypoxic brain injury, resulting in a profound intellectual disability. Advised by doctors that the infant had only days to live, Shekar had feigned the stillbirth to spare his recovering wife the trauma of a terminal diagnosis. However, the child survived and has spent the past two years under the specialized care of Dr. Sheela, the woman Shekar had been meeting. Deeply saddened by the multi-year deceit but driven by maternal instinct, Chitra insists on bringing Anjali home.

Anjali's arrival disrupts the household. Her developmental challenges and the exhaustive attention she requires from her parents cause Arjun and Anu to resent her. The sibling rivalry dissolves when one of Arjun's friends bullies Anjali; Arjun fiercely defends his sister, sustaining minor injuries in the ensuing altercation. When an innocent Anjali tenderly cares for his bruises, a deep emotional bond forms between them. Arjun becomes highly protective of Anjali, eventually leading his peer group to unconditionally accept and embrace her. However, the conservative parents in the housing society object to their children associating with a disabled child and demand the family's eviction. Dennis intervenes, aggressively contesting their discriminatory demands and forcing the residents to back down out of fear. Over time, Anjali’s innocence wins over the entire apartment complex.

Concurrently, during a late-night visit to his construction site alongside Chitra and Anjali, Shekar witnesses a murder orchestrated by a local criminal. He reports the crime to the authorities, leading to the perpetrator's arrest. Upon securing bail, the criminal invades Shekar's apartment to seek vengeance. Dennis arrives to defend the family; during the violent struggle, he kills the intruder. Before being apprehended by the arriving police, a grateful Dennis thanks Shekar, noting that Anjali was the only person in the colony who had ever treated him with unconditioned compassion. The following morning, Anu attempts to wake Anjali, only to discover that she has peacefully died in her sleep. The grieving family and the transformed neighborhood residents gather together to mourn the loss of the child.

== Cast ==
- Shamili as Anjali
- Tarun as Arjun
- Shruti as Anu
- Raghuvaran as Shekar
- Revathi as Chitra
- Prabhu as Dennis Joseph (cameo)
- Saranya as Dr. Sheela (cameo)
- Nishanti (special appearance in the song "Iravu Nilavu")
- V. K. Ramasamy as Umapathi
- Poornam Viswanathan as Narayanaswamy
- Charuhasan as the apartment colony head
- Janagaraj as the watchman
- Oru Viral Krishna Rao as the driver
- Charle as a police officer
- Krishnan as Krishnan
- Babu Antony as Dharma
- Anand (Special appearance in the song "Motta Maadi")
- Gayathri (Special appearance in the song "Motta Maadi")
- Richard (Special appearance in the song "Motta Maadi")
- Anand Krishnamoorthi as Anjali's friend

== Production ==
=== Development ===
The idea of Anjali was developed by Mani Ratnam during the making of Nayakan (1987). He initially approached Dennis Joseph to have the screenplay for Anjali written. Being a fan of Ratnam's work, Dennis Joseph agreed to write but as months went by he could not work on it due to other commitments. Eventually, Ratnam decided to write the film himself. Anjali was also Ratnam's first film since Mouna Ragam (1986) without P. C. Sreeram as cinematographer, for which he used Madhu Ambat instead. Ambat said he agreed to work on the film because he liked Ratnam's earlier work. B. Lenin and V. T. Vijayan served as editors.

=== Casting and filming ===
Mohan was originally considered for playing the male lead, but he refused due to creative differences with the director. The role later went to Raghuvaran. Shamili was three years old while doing this film. The crew had difficulty to get the character right for her, so they found the solution by recording videos of a special child. Shamili's father put in a lot of effort, and he would make her watch every day to observe the actions of the child. Prabhu's character was named after Dennis Joseph. Singer Pop Shalini was offered the role of Anjali's sister but her mother refused the role as not to affect her education. Anand Krishnamoorthi, who later gained fame as a sound engineer, made his debut as a child actor.

== Soundtrack ==
The soundtrack was composed by Ilaiyaraaja and lyrics by Vaali. It is Ilaiyaraaja's 500th film as a composer.

Tamil Track listing
No.	Title	Singer(s)	Length
1.	"Something Something"	Karthik Raja, Yuvan Shankar Raja, Bhavatharini, Venkat Prabhu, Premgi Amaren, Bala, Parthi Bhaskar, Hari Bhaskar	5:03
2.	"Raathiri Nerathil"	S. P. Balasubrahmanyam	4:58
3.	"Iravu Nilavu"	S. Janaki, Karthik Raja, Yuvan Shankar Raja, Bhavatharini, Venkat Prabhu, Premgi Amaren, Parthi Bhaskar, Hari Bhaskar	4:46
4.	"Anjali Anjali"	Sathya, Karthik Raja, Yuvan Shankar Raja, Bhavatharini, Venkat Prabhu, Premgi Amaren, Parthi Bhaskar, Hari Bhaskar, Vaishnavi	5:33
5.	"Vaanam Namakku"	Karthik Raja, Yuvan Shankar Raja, Bhavatharini, Venkat Prabhu, Premgi Amaren, Parthi Bhaskar, Hari Bhaskar	4:51
6.	"Vegam Vegam"	Usha Uthup	4:56
7.	"Motta Maadi"	Karthik Raja, Yuvan Shankar Raja, Bhavatharini, Venkat Prabhu, Premgi Amaren, Parthi Bhaskar, Hari Bhaskar	4:32
Total length:			34:39

All lyrics are written by Rajasri.

Telugu Track listing
No.	Title	Singer(s)	Length
1.	"Paattaku"	Kousalya, Lalitha, Subhasri, Prasanna, Sharmila, Jama, R. Sulochana, B Padma, R.Kalpana	5:23
2.	"Meda Paina"	Kousalya, Lalitha, Subhasri, Prasanna, Sharmila, Jama, R. Sulochana, B Padma, R.Kalpana	4:52
3.	"Chanda Mama"	S Janaki	5:13
4.	"Anjali Anjali"	Kousalya, Lalitha, Subhasri, Prasanna, Sharmila, Jama, R. Sulochana, B Padma, R.Kalpana	6:18
5.	"Vegam Vegam"	Anitha Reddy	5:30
6.	"Raathiri Vela"	S. P. Balasubrahmanyam	5:36
7.	"Gaganam"	Kousalya, Lalitha, Subhasri, Prasanna, Sharmila, Jama, R. Sulochana, B Padma, R.Kalpana	5:17
Total length:			38:11

All lyrics are written by Sameer.

Hindi Track listing
No.	Title	Singer(s)	Length
1.	"Amber Hamara Raasta"	Chorus	4:46
2.	"Aayega Aayega"	Kavitha Krishnamurthy, Chorus	4:43
3.	"Ek Love Jodi"	Chorus	4:27
4.	"Anjali Anjali"	Chorus	5:41
5.	"I Want Something"	Chorus	4:52
6.	"Magic Journey"	Amit Kumar	4:53
7.	"Star Wars"	Abhijeet Bhattacharya	4:57
Total length:			34:19

== Release and reception ==
Anjali was released on 12 July 1990 by GV Films. The following day, N. Krishnaswamy wrote for The Indian Express that "directing so many kids must have been such a difficult task ... and [Mani Ratnam] has been so successful in this department." On 5 August 1990, Ananda Vikatan overwhelmingly appreciated the film, rating it 58 out of 100.

A Telugu dubbed version was released later that year. After the success of the Hindi dubbed version of Roja (1992), this film was dubbed in Hindi in 1993.

== Accolades ==
Anjali was chosen as India's official entry to the Oscars in 1991, but was not nominated. It was screened at the International Film Festival of India along with Sandhya Raagam (1990) as the only two Tamil films as part of Indian Panorama.

Event	Award	Recipient(s)	Ref.
Tamil Nadu State Film Awards	Special Prize for Best Film	Anjali	
Tamil Nadu State Film Awards	Best Child Artist	Shamili	
38th National Film Awards	Best Child Artist	Shamili, Tarun, Shruti	
38th National Film Awards	Best Audiography	Pandu Rangan	
38th National Film Awards	Best Feature Film in Tamil	Anjali	
Cinema Express Awards	Best Director – Tamil	Mani Ratnam	
Cinema Express Awards	Best Actress – Tamil	Revathi	
Cinema Express Awards	Best Child Actress	Shamili	

== See also ==
- List of submissions to the 63rd Academy Awards for Best Foreign Language Film
- Doni (film), 2013 Sri Lankan remake

== Bibliography ==
- Rangan, Baradwaj (2012). Conversations with Mani Ratnam. India: Penguin Books. ISBN 978-0-670-08520-0.
