= Aan Paavam (TV series) =

2012 Indian Tamil-language television series

- Genre: Soap opera
- Written by: Pon Gandhiraajan
- Screenplay by: T.C. Bala
- Directed by: T.C. Bala (1-93)
- Creative director: T. G. Thyagarajan
- Starring: Rajesh; Meera Krishnan; Indraja; Aishwarya; Sujibala; Barath Kalyan
- Country of origin: India
- Original language: Tamil
- No. of seasons: 1
- No. of episodes: 93

Production
- Producer: T.G. Thyagarajan
- Camera setup: M.R. Saravana Kumar
- Running time: approx. 20-22 minutes per episode
- Production company: Sathya Jyothi Films

Original release
- Network: Sun TV
- Release: 6 February – 15 June 2012

Aanpavam is a 2012 Tamil-language soap opera that aired on Sun TV from February 6, 2012 to 15 June 2012 during weekdays. The show was screenplayed and directed by T.C. Bala and produced under Sathya Jyothi Films by T.G. Thyagarajan.

== Plot ==
The story revolves around the family of the couple Gopalswamy and Mahalakshmi and their four sons and the problems they face in their lives.

== Cast ==
=== Main ===
- Rajesh as Gopalswamy
- Meera Krishnan as Mahalakshmi

=== Recurring ===
- Indraja
- Barath Kalyan
- Raaj Kamal
- Venkat
- Mahalakshmi
- Satish Kumar as Cheenu a.k.a. Srinivasan
- Aishwarya
- Jayashree
- Magi
- Gowri
- Lakshmi
- Karthika
- Sujibala
- Ramya
- Tamiz Mani
- Bombay Babu
- Paandi

== Production ==
=== Casting ===
In this serial Rajesh and Meera Krishnan are playing the role as father and mother; Barath Kalyan, Raaj Kamal, Venkat, Satish are the sons. Pairing with them are Indraja, Jayshree, Gowri, Lakshmi, Ishwarya.
