= Unaroo =

1984 film by Mani Ratnam

- Theatrical release poster
- Directed by: Mani Ratnam
- Written by: T. Damodaran
- Produced by: N. G. John
- Starring: Mohanlal; Sukumaran; Ratheesh; Sabitha Anand; Balan K. Nair
- Cinematography: Ramachandra Babu
- Edited by: B. Lenin
- Music by: Ilaiyaraaja
- Production company: Geo Movie Production
- Release date: 14 April 1984
- Running time: 150 minutes
- Country: India
- Language: Malayalam

Unaroo (transl. Wake Up) is a 1984 Indian Malayalam-language political drama film directed by Mani Ratnam and written by T. Damodaran, starring Mohanlal, Sukumaran, Ratheesh, Sabitha Anand, Ashokan and Balan K. Nair, with music composed by Ilaiyaraaja and cinematography by Ramachandra Babu. The film gives the inside view of the problems that arose in the labour trade union parties in Kerala. It was released on 14 April 1984.

== Plot ==
This is the story of a group of workers who defy their union leaders to help a new factory materialise.

== Cast ==
- Mohanlal as Ramu
- Sukumaran as Janardanan
- Ratheesh as Peter
- Sabitha Anand as Marry
- Balan K. Nair as Hakkim
- Unni Mary as Sara
- Krishnachandran
- Ashokan as Sajan
- Jagannatha Varma as Bharathan
- Lalu Alex
- Kundara Johny as Koshy
- Prathapachandran
- Philomina
- Paravoor Bharathan
- Janardhanan
- Sathyakala

== Production ==
Producer N. G. John, who had experienced success with Ee Nadu (1982) and Iniyengilum (1983), had been impressed with Mani Ratnam's debut film Pallavi Anu Pallavi (1983), a Kannada film that tackled a complex subject. John offered Ratnam the chance to direct a Malayalam film for his production house. Ratnam initially narrated the script of Mouna Ragam (1986), then titled Divya, to John but the producer wanted to make a political film. Subsequently, he began work on Unaroo, which revolved around corruption in the labour union movement and scripted the film alongside John and Damodaran. Ratnam revealed that he struggled with the film, owing to its alien concept from his previous film on human relationships, as well as due to the sheer number of artistes involved. The film began production in February 1984 and was shot in a single stretch.

== Soundtrack ==
The music was composed by Ilaiyaraaja and the lyrics were written by Yusufali Kechery. The song "Theeram Thedi Olam Padi" was reused by Ilaiyaraaja himself as "Roja Ondru Mutham Ketkum" in the film Komberi Mookan, that was released in the same year.

Track listing
No.	Title	Lyrics	Singer(s)	Length
1.	"Deepame"	Yusufali Kechery	S. Janaki, Chorus, C. O. Anto, Krishnachandran
2.	"Theeram Thedi Olam Padi"	Yusufali Kechery	S. Janaki

== Bibliography ==
- Rangan, Baradwaj (2012). Conversations with Mani Ratnam. Penguin Books. ISBN 978-0-670-08520-0.
