= Political Film Society Awards Special Award =

For film awards, special awards were conferred in the 1980s and 1990s for the best political film at the East-West Center Film Festival, now the Hawaii International Film Festival. The awards for 2001 and 2009 were conferred because those films had not been properly nominated for the years when they were first screened. The 1990, 1995, and 2010 films were voted the best films on Hawai`i.

- 1987 The Killing Fields
- 1988 Vietnam
- 1989 A City of Sadness
- 1990 Pele's Appeal
- 1991 City of Hope
- 1992 Midnight Express
- 1993 Farewell, My Concubine
- 1994 Bombay
- 1995 Picture Bride
- 1996 Six O'Clock News
- 1997 Poverty Outlaw
- 2001 The Distinguished Gentleman
- 2009 The Cider House Rules
- 2010 Princess Ka`iulani
