= Pallavi Anu Pallavi =

1983 film by Mani Ratnam

- Poster
- Directed by: Mani Ratnam
- Written by: Mani Ratnam
- Produced by: T. Govindarajan
- Starring: Anil Kapoor; Lakshmi; Kiran Vairale
- Cinematography: Balu Mahendra
- Edited by: B. Lenin
- Music by: Ilaiyaraaja
- Production company: Venus Pictures
- Release date: 7 January 1983
- Running time: 140 minutes
- Country: India
- Language: Kannada

Pallavi Anu Pallavi is a 1983 Indian Kannada-language romantic drama film written and directed by Mani Ratnam in his debut. The film stars Anil Kapoor, Lakshmi, and Kiran Vairale. It revolves around a young man falling in love with a slightly older woman. The music was composed by Ilaiyaraaja, while cinematography was handled by Balu Mahendra. The film is also Anil Kapoor's debut in Kannada cinema.

Pallavi Anu Pallavi was released on 7 January 1983 to critical acclaim. However, the film was an average grosser at the box office, performing well in bigger cities but not so well in smaller towns and villages. The film won in three categories at the Karnataka State Film Awards: Best Screenplay for Ratnam, Best Cinematographer for Balu Mahendra and Best Dialogue for R. N. Jayagopal.

== Plot ==
Having pledged his love for college girl Madhu, Vijay finds himself entwined in a close friendship with Anu, a married woman separated from her husband. Vijay grapples with the definition of love, treading the fine line between trust and attraction, amidst tremendous societal pressure. He is confused about his feelings for Anu, yet wants Madhu as his life partner. Amid all this is his youthful streak of rebellion, ready to take on the world despite the society's extreme reaction, which creates more grief than good.

== Cast ==
- Anil Kapoor as Vijay
- Lakshmi as Anu
- Kiran Vairale as Madhu
- Vikram Makandar as Kumar
- Master Rohith Srinath as Harsha, Anu and Kumar's son
- Suresh Heblikar
- Sundar Raj

== Production ==
=== Development ===
After completing his MBA and beginning work as a management consultant, Mani Ratnam was keen to enter the film industry and thus accepted the invitation of his friends Ravishankar and Raman (the sons of director B. R. Panthulu and musician S. Balachander respectively) to co-write the script of a Kannada film they were making, titled Bangarada Gani. Featuring Vishnuvardhan, Lakshmi, Ambareesh and Roja Ramani, the film was never completed and was later shelved. Ratnam then decided to branch out as a director himself and wrote a script entirely in English, during a single month in 1980.

With the script of the film which he intended to make in Tamil, Ratnam first met Kamal Haasan to play the protagonist, after his friend Kitty arranged a meeting with the actor. Haasan demanded major changes to the script if he were to play the lead role, and introduced Ratnam to his brother Charuhasan, who pledged to help find the script a producer. Ratnam revealed that he was open to the idea of selling the script to a popular director so that he could learn about filmmaking during the production process, but his meetings with K. Balachander, Bharathiraja and Mahendran were not successful. Haasan had later claimed that he was unable to work in Pallavi Anu Pallavi due to his commitment to Raja Paarvai (1981) and around the same time "also getting into Hindi films".

Ratnam subsequently met several producers. The script was rejected by over twenty studios, including Rajkannu of Sri Amman Creations and Gowri Shankar of Devi Films. Subsequently, Ratnam's uncle Krishnamurthy and T. Govindarajan of Venus Films agreed to finance the film on the condition that he made it as a low-budget Kannada film. While P. C. Sreeram was his original choice for cinematography, the producers insisted on an established cinematographer. Ratnam then approached Balu Mahendra. Ratnam also convinced B. Lenin (who was incidentally his neighbour), to work as the editor, since he had been impressed with his editing of Mahendran's Uthiripookkal (1979). Thota Tharani who happened to meet Ratnam during the shoot of Raja Paarvai, which the director had gone to watch, joined the team next.

=== Casting ===
While selecting the cast, Ratnam approached Lakshmi, with whom he had worked during the making of Bangarada Gani to portray the lead character with whom the younger man falls in love. Lakshmi was a well-established star at the time, and her coming on board, prompted Krishnamurthy to agree to financing the film. Anil Kapoor was chosen to portray the male protagonist after Ratnam was impressed with his performance in the Telugu film Vamsa Vruksham (1980). Kapoor also helped bring Kiran Vairale on board when Suhasini turned down the role. Rohit, the son of Srinath, was a child actor in the film and appeared in Ratnam's first shot.

=== Filming ===
Ratnam did not know Kannada before directing the film but learned it "on the job", as he extensively researched literature for the script at the USIS and British Council offices in Chennai. With the help of his associate Shivanand, he was able to convert the English dialogues into Kannada and help Kapoor and Kiran Vairale perform to their respective lines, in a language unfamiliar to them. The film was shot in Coorg and Bangalore, close to Venus Films' distribution centre in the city. Towards the end of production, the film ran into financial difficulties and it took twenty one months to finish the final three days of the shoot, owing to call-sheet conflicts.

== Soundtrack ==
Ilaiyaraaja composed the score and soundtrack, the lyrics for which were written by R. N. Jayagopal. In his biographical book Conversations with Mani Ratnam, Ratnam revealed that Balu Mahendra introduced him to Ilaiyaraaja. Ratnam told Ilaiyaraaja that he was doing a Kannada film with a very small budget but wanted him to compose the music, while also confessing that he could not afford to pay the latter's market price. Ilaiyaraaja agreed to work for one-fifth the amount he was getting at the time. The composer would go on to collaborate with the director for nine more films, including acclaimed Tamil films like Mouna Ragam (1986), Nayakan (1987), Agni Natchathiram (1988), Anjali (1990) and Thalapathi (1991).

Track listing
No.	Title	Singer(s)	Length
1.	"Nagu Endide"	S. Janaki	4:23
2.	"Hrudaya Rangoli"	S. P. Sailaja	4:06
3.	"Naguva Nayana"	S. P. Balasubrahmanyam, S. Janaki	4:10
4.	"O Premi O Premi"	S. P. Balasubrahmanyam	4:23
Total length:			17:02

== Release ==
Pallavi Anu Pallavi was released on 7 January 1983. The film experienced moderate success at the box office, performing well in bigger cities but not so well in smaller towns and villages.

== Awards ==
1982–83 Karnataka State Film Awards

- Best Screenplay – Mani Ratnam
- Best Cinematographer – Balu Mahendra
- Best Dialogue – R. N. Jayagopal

== Legacy ==
Pallavi Anu Pallavi was dubbed in Telugu with the same title and in Tamil as Priya oh Priya. Idea Cellular used the tune of "Naguva Nayana" as the theme music for some of their advertisements.

== Bibliography ==
- Rangan, Baradwaj (2012). Conversations with Mani Ratnam. Penguin Books India. ISBN 978-0-670-08520-0.
