= Meena (2023 TV series) =

Indian television series

- Genre: Drama
- Created by: T. G. Thiyagarajan
- Written by: Dialogue; Rajesh Khanna
- Screenplay by: G.Radhakrishnan
- Directed by: Muthukumarasamy
- Starring: Indhu Chowdhary; Jay Srinivasa Kumar
- Theme music composer: Ajesh
- Opening theme: "Poove Kathai Pesalama" Saindhavi (Vocals), Snehan (Lyrics)
- Country of origin: India
- Original language: Tamil
- No. of seasons: 1
- No. of episodes: 368

Production
- Producer: Selvi Thiyagarajan; G.Saravanan
- Cinematography: C. Dhandapani
- Editor: Subash Bagavathiappan
- Camera setup: Multi-camera
- Running time: approx.20-22 minutes per episode
- Production company: Sathya Jyothi Films; Sun Entertainment

Original release
- Network: Sun TV
- Release: 24 July 2023 – 10 October 2024

Meena is a 2023-2024 Indian Tamil-language television series, starring Indhu Chowdhary and Jay Srinivasa Kumar. The show is directed by Muthukumarasamy and produced by Selvi Thiyagarajan and G.Saravanan under the banner of Sathya Jyothi Films and Sun Entertainment.

It was premiered on 24 July 2023 aired on Sun TV from Monday to Saturday and ended with 368 episodes from 10 October 2024. It is also available on the digital platform Sun NXT.

== Cast ==
=== Main ===
- Indhu Chowdhary as Meena Ram: A school teacher; Ram's wife (2023-2024)
- Jay Srinivasa Kumar as Ram Chidambaram: Chidambaram and Revathy's son; Meena's husband (2023-2024)

=== Recurring ===
- Abhishek Shankar as Sathyamoorthy: Chidambaram's arch-rival (2023-2024)
- Vignesh as Chidambaram: Sathyamoorthy's arch-rival (2023-2024)
- Sujatha Selvaraj as Subbulakshmi: Kasturi's mother (2023-2024)
- Vanadana Michel as Vedhanayagi, Chidambaram and Sathyamoorthy's arch-rival (2024)
- Kavyavarshini Arun as Anjali Gokul: Meena's arch-rival; Gokul's wife (2023-2024)
- Sonia Bose as Kasthuri: Sathyamoorthy's wife; Chidambaram's sister (2023-2024)
- Munish Raja as Gokul: Kasturi's brother; Anjali's husband (2023-2024)
- Bila Bose as Sukanya's husband, Divya's father
- S.Kumaran as Kumaran Sathyamoorthy: Sathyamoorthy's son (2023-2024)
- Harikrishnan as Ganesan Sathyamoorthy: Sathyamoorthy's son; Devi's husband (2023-2024)
- Minnal Deepa as Revathy: Chidambaram's wife (2023-2024)
- Ra. Sangeetha as Devi Ganesan: Chidambaram and Revathy's daughter (2023-2024)
- Kavitha Solairaja as Sukanya: Chidambaram's sister
- Kurinji Nathan as Paralogam (2023-2024)
- Dharani Hephziba as Divya: Sukanya 's husband; Sukanya's daughter
- C. Parthasarathy (2023)
- Thangamani (2023)

== Production ==
=== Development ===
Initially produced under the working title Sabash Meena, Meena was produced by Selvi Thiyagarakan and G. Saravanana with the production company Sathya Jyothi Films. The first promo was released under the title Meena on 11 July 2023.

The concept of the show was originally based on Vikraman's 1996 film Poove Unakkaga.

=== Casting ===
Indhu Chowdhary and Jay Srinivasa Kumar were cast as the leads Meena and Ram Chidambaram. At the time of casting, Kumar had been participating in the television series Ilakkiya; Kumar would end up leaving his role there in order to join the Meena cast. Abhishek Shankar was cast as Sathyamoorthy, marking his return after Pudhu Pudhu Arthangal. Vignesh was cast as Chidambaram and Sonia played the role of Sathyamoorthy's wife.

=== Release ===
The show was broadcast on Sun TV starting on 24 July 2023 from Monday to Saturday.
