= Cohabitation in India =

Cohabitation in India is legal. It is prevalent mostly among the people living in metro cities in India.

== Legal decisions ==
Protection of Women from Domestic Violence Act 2005 recognizes “relationship in the nature of marriage” and protects female partners from domestic violence. Such partners can claim monetary and other reliefs under the Act.

In S. Khushboo Vs. Kanniammal & Anr., the Supreme Court of India, placing reliance upon its earlier decision in Lata Singh Vs. State of U.P. & Anr., held that live-in-relationship is permissible only in unmarried major persons of heterogeneous sex. The Supreme Court on 13 August 2010 in the case of Madan Mohan Singh & Ors v. Rajni Kant & Anr. has once again entered the debate on legality of the Live-in Relationship as well as legitimacy of Child born out of such relationship. The Court while dismissing the appeal in the property dispute held that there is a presumption of marriage between those who are in live-in relationship for a long time and this cannot be termed as 'walking-in and walking-out' relationship. In the case of Bharata Matha & Ors v. R. Vijaya Renganathan & Ors. dealing with the legitimacy of child born out of a live-in relationship and his succession of property rights, the Supreme Court held that child born out of a live-in relationship may be allowed to succeed inheritance in the property of the parents, if any, but doesn't have any claim as against Hindu ancestral coparcenary property.

The Delhi High Court in its decision on 10 August 2010, in Alok Kumar v. State & Anr while dealing with the validity of live-in relationship held that "‘Live-in relationship’ is a walk-in and walk-out relationship. There are no strings attached to this relationship, neither this relationship creates any legal bond between the parties. It is a contract of living together which is renewed every day by the parties and can be terminated by either of the parties without the consent of the other party and one party can walk out at will at any time." (Para 6)

The Supreme Court in the case of D. Velusamy v.D. Patchaiammal held that a ‘relationship in the nature of marriage’ under the 2005 Act must also fulfill the following criteria:

(a) The couple must hold themselves out to society as being akin to spouses.
(b) They must be of legal age to marry.
(c) They must be otherwise qualified to enter into a legal marriage, including being unmarried.
(d) They must have voluntarily cohabited and held themselves out to the world as being akin to spouses for a significant period of time, and in addition, the parties must have lived together in a ‘shared household’ as defined in Section 2(s) of the Act. Merely spending weekends together or a one-night stand would not make it a ‘domestic relationship’. It also held that if a man has a ‘keep’ whom he maintains financially and uses mainly for sexual purpose and/or as a servant it would not, in our opinion, be a relationship in the nature of marriage’.

On a notable context, though cohabitation is made legal in India, it is still a subject of taboo in many parts. Patriarchy is deeply entrenched while the courts and society promote the monolithic view of a family and this needs to transform. Such couples have sometimes faced threats from the outer circle and their families concerned to an alarming state of being. For example: in 2016, a Mumbai-based live-in couple committed suicide after their family opposed their marriage in Andheri east area of the city. One of the most notable books written in contemporary Indian English regarding the aforementioned subject is in 2014 by Kajol Aikat called Unsocial Amigos, which is about how two young adults go in a live-in relationship in an Indian semi-urban socio-economic setup and its rooted consequences upon the grounds of moral policing.
