= Roja (film) =

1992 Indian film by Mani Ratnam

- Theatrical release poster
- Directed by: Mani Ratnam
- Written by: Story & Screenplay: Mani Ratnam; Dialogues: Sujatha
- Produced by: K. Balachander (presenter); Rajam Balachander; Pushpa Kandaswamy
- Starring: Arvind Swamy; Madhubala; Nassar; Pankaj Kapur
- Cinematography: Santosh Sivan
- Edited by: Suresh Urs
- Music by: A. R. Rahman
- Production company: Kavithalayaa Productions
- Distributed by: GV Films
- Release date: 15 August 1992
- Running time: 137 minutes
- Country: India
- Language: Tamil

Roja is a 1992 Indian Tamil-language romantic thriller film directed and co-written by Mani Ratnam. The film stars Arvind Swamy and Madhoo (credited as Madhubala). The film was produced by K. Balachander under his Kavithalayaa Productions and distributed by G. Venkateswaran. The film's cinematography was handled by Santhosh Sivan, production design by Thota Tharani, music by A. R. Rahman in his debut and editing by Suresh Urs. Roja follows a young woman from Sundarapandiapuram a village in southern Tamil Nadu as she makes desperate efforts to find her husband, who is kidnapped by militants during a secret undercover mission in Jammu and Kashmir.

The film released on 15 August 1992, India's independence day, to positive reviews, receiving praise for its patriotic theme and critically acclaimed soundtrack. It was featured in the Indian panorama section of the 24th IFFI. Roja won three National Film Awards, including Best Film on National Integration, catapulting Ratnam to national acclaim. The film also gained international acclaim with its nomination for Best Film at the 18th Moscow International Film Festival. The film was re-released for international audiences in light of the growing fear of terrorist attacks across the world. It is the first in Mani Ratnam's trilogy of films, preceding Bombay (1995) and Dil Se.. (1998), that depict human relationships against a background of Indian politics.

A. R. Rahman debuted as a composer with this film. He won the National Film Award for Best Music Direction, Filmfare Award for Best Music Director – Tamil and the Tamil Nadu State Film Award for Best Music Director for his work.

== Plot ==
In Srinagar, an Indian Army team led by Colonel Rayappa successfully captures Wasim Khan, a high-ranking Kashmiri separatist militant. Meanwhile, in the peaceful village of Sundarapandiapuram in Tamil Nadu, eighteen-year-old Roja hopes that the upcoming marriage proposal for her elder sister, Shenbagam, goes smoothly. The suitor is Rishi Kumar, a cryptologist working for the R&AW. Unknown to the family, Shenbagam is secretly in love with her maternal cousin. When Rishi requests a private conversation with Shenbagam, she confesses her relationship and begs him to reject the alliance publicly to spare her family from shame. Rishi complies but surprises everyone by proposing to marry Roja instead. Unaware of the underlying truth, Roja initially resents Rishi for seemingly slighting her sister, but she ultimately acquiesces to the marriage. The couple relocates to Madras, while Shenbagam marries her cousin.

Upon discovering Shenbagam's secret and realizing Rishi’s honorable intentions, Roja apologizes, and a deep romance blossoms between the newlyweds. Their domestic bliss is cut short when Rishi's superior falls ill, forcing Rishi to be deployed to an army communications center in Baramulla, Jammu and Kashmir, to intercept military intelligence. Roja accompanies him to the region. Shortly after their arrival, Roja’s world is upended when a group of militants abducts Rishi from a temple. The group, led by a lieutenant named Liaqat, demands the release of Wasim Khan from judicial custody in exchange for Rishi’s life.

Faced with a devastating crisis, Roja desperately seeks assistance from local politicians and the military. Her efforts are severely hindered by a stark language barrier, as she speaks only Tamil while the local authorities and residents speak Hindi and Kashmiri. Simultaneously in captivity, Rishi undergoes intense interrogation but remains unyielding, attempting to reason with his captors about the futility and immorality of their violent secessionist campaign. While the militants remain hardened, Liaqat’s sister privately shows compassion toward Rishi. When Roja's initial appeals fail to move the bureaucracy, the Indian Government publicly announces its policy of refusing to negotiate with terrorists.

The situation escalates when the militants attempt to burn the Indian national flag in front of Rishi; Rishi risks his life by throwing himself onto the flames to extinguish the fire, deeply moving some of his captors with his raw patriotism. Tensions within the militant camp compound when Liaqat’s younger brother, who had been sent across the border to Pakistan for combat training, is killed by the Pakistani military. Though shaken by this betrayal, Liaqat forces himself to remain committed to his cause. Back in the capital, Roja's relentless, grief-stricken appeals finally touch a senior minister, who overrides military objections and orders the release of Wasim Khan in exchange for Rishi.

Colonel Rayappa strongly objects to the trade, viewing the release of a dangerous militant as a catastrophic security failure. Sensing his role as a political pawn, Rishi escapes from the militant hideout with the covert assistance of Liaqat’s sympathetic sister. Liaqat and his men give chase. Rayappa, Roja, and the military escort arrive at the designated hostage exchange spot with Wasim Khan, but the exchange falls through when Rishi and his captors fail to appear, forcing the army to return Khan to custody. Having evaded his pursuers and subdued two militants in hand-to-hand combat, Rishi is cornered by Liaqat just short of the border. Facing the gun, Rishi delivers a final, passionate argument against the immorality of Liaqat's war. Convinced and remorseful, Liaqat lowers his weapon, renounces his mission, and allows Rishi to go free. Liaqat escapes into the wilderness just as Rishi safely arrives at the army outpost, passionately reuniting with Roja.

== Cast ==
- Arvind Swamy as Rishi Kumar
- Madhubala as Roja
- Nassar as Colonel Rayappa
- Janagaraj as Achu Maharaj
- Pankaj Kapur as Liaqat
- Shiva Rindani as Wasim Khan
- Vaishnavi Aravind as Shenbagam
- C. K. Saraswathi as one of the village seniors
- Vijaya Chandrika as Roja's mother
- Sathyapriya as Rishi's mother
- Vatsala Rajagopal as Roja's paternal grandmother
- Sujitha as Chinna Ponnu
- S. V. Venkatraman as Chandramoorthy, Rishikumar's chief and RAW official
- Nirmala Periyasamy as Newsreader
- Rangammal
- Manikandan. G. as Liaqat's brother
- Padmini as Liaqat's sister
- Raju Sundaram (special appearance in the song "Rukmini")

== Production ==
=== Development ===
On 28 June 1991, K. Doraiswamy, an executive of the Indian Oil Corporation, was kidnapped by Kashmiri militants and put in captivity for two months. This inspired Mani Ratnam to make the film Roja. Doraiswamy's wife was fighting for his release, and according to Ratnam, it was her plight that the film was based on.

During the making of Anjali (1990), Ratnam told actor and director Kitty the outline of Roja and offered him to direct the film. Kitty declined, as he wanted to do something of his own. As Ratnam was telling him the outline, the subject became more crystallised. Kitty did not pick it up and when filmmaker K. Balachander asked Ratnam, he told him the outline. All the developments happened after that. It was Balachander who approached Ratnam to make a film for his banner. As Balachander was the inspiration and the reason for Ratnam entering Tamil films, when he asked him to make a film for his banner, Ratnam wanted it to be one of the best films they had produced. Ratnam was keen that it needed to be of Balachander's standard. Balachander instantly approved the outline of the film when Ratnam narrated. However, he disliked the title Roja (Rose) as he felt it sounded similar to the name of a brand of crushed betel nut. Ratnam thought the title represented Kashmir because "the rose is something beautiful but with thorns". To satisfy Balachander, he suggested another title Irudhi Varai (Till the end), but Balachander preferred Roja, which was finalised.

Roja was the first film for which Ratnam used a Steadicam, in the shot that introduces the terrorists' hideout to the audiences. The film was made on a shoestring budget. The technicians worked for less money with the understanding that the film would also be sold for less money. It was not thought of as something that would work on a big scale. The film was composed mostly of newcomers, a new music director, and it was about Kashmir which, according to Ratnam, not much was known to Tamil people at that time. He called the film "a bit of an experiment". It is also the first in Ratnam's trilogy of films that depict human relationships against a background of Indian politics, including Bombay (1995) and Dil Se.. (1998). Roja is a contemporary adaptation of the story of Savitri and Satyavan. According to Ratnam, it was not originally planned as a political film: "It was a phase India was going through and these things affected me and found their way into my work."

=== Casting ===
Arvind Swamy was signed on to play the lead role in Roja after Rajiv Menon declined. Aishwarya and Ayesha Jhulka were initial choices for the female lead, but declined due to date issues; the role went to Madhoo, credited as Madhubala. Aishwarya later revealed that she deeply regretted her decision, which was made by her grandmother against her will, for a Telugu film which was later cancelled. Ratnam wanted a North Indian actor to portray Liaqat, a Kashmiri character, and Pankaj Kapur accepted when approached. Ratnam approached Karisma Kapoor to play a Kashmiri girl, but ultimately decided not to cast her, believing she was "far too expensive for a Tamil film"; the role went to another actress.

=== Filming ===
Ratnam had planned to shoot Roja in Kashmir, but extreme terrorism there forced him to shoot the film in other hill stations resembling it. Shooting locations included Coonoor, Ooty, and Manali, Himachal Pradesh. The film's cinematographer Santosh Sivan said that a lot of images were written in at the script level; even in the Kashmir sequences, the audience only sees the snow when Roja sees it for the first time. These things were written into the script. The song "Chinna Chinna Aasai" was shot at Hogenakkal Falls in Dharmapuri and in the Banatheertham Falls in Papanasam, Tirunelveli. Shakti Singh dubbed for Arvind Swami in the Hindi version of the film, while Madhubala dubbed for herself. The whole film was completed in less than 60 days. The final length of the film was 3,750 metres (12,300 ft).

== Themes and influences ==
Writing for the magazine Jump Cut, Kumudan Maderya noted that Roja celebrates "the middle-class yuppie hero’s nationalistic fervor" and positions the "anti-national communalist terrorists in Kashmir" as key threats to India as a whole. Vairamuthu, who was signed as the lyricist, felt the film's "tense and action-packed" content was in sharp contrast to the "poetic" title. Journalist Malini Mannath and a writer for Bangalore Mirror compared Roja to Held Hostage (1991), a television film about the kidnapping of journalist Jerry Levin whose rescue was organised by his wife.

== Soundtrack ==
The soundtrack and background score for the film was composed by A. R. Rahman in his debut as a music director. Mani Ratnam, who previously worked with Ilayaraaja in his earlier films, replaced him with Rahman, who worked as a keyboard programmer for Ilayaraaja for his film Punnagai Mannan (1986), also marking their first collaboration as well. The album features seven tracks in Tamil and Hindi, and six tracks in Telugu, Malayalam and Marathi and five tracks in the instrumental adaptation album.

The song "Thamizha Thamizha" is a poem written by Subramanya Bharathi. "Chinna Chinna Aasai" was the first song Rahman had composed for the film. The song "Kadhal Rojave" has two versions in both Tamil and Hindi; a solo and a duet in the former. The Hindi version of the song, titled "Roja Jaaneman", has two versions – one by S. P. Balasubrahmanyam and the other by Hariharan.

The album received critical acclaim and was also listed in Time magazine's "10 Best Soundtracks" of all time. The Tamil and Hindi versions of the album sold over 3 million units in India, with the Tamil version selling over 200,000 units and the Hindi version selling 2.8 million units.

== Release ==
Roja was released on 15 August 1992, and distributed by GV Films. In August 2015, it was screened at the 2015 London Indian Film Festival, in the retrospective series Politics as Spectacle: The Films of Mani Ratnam, along with Bombay and Dil Se. Owing to the commercial response in domestic market, Roja was dubbed and released in Hindi, Telugu, Marathi and Malayalam languages, all of which proved to be equally successful ventures.

== Reception ==
=== Critical response ===
Roja received praise for its patriotic themes. On 26 September 1992, K. Vijiyan of New Straits Times wrote, "Under Mani Ratnam's direction, Arvind and Madhubala gave their best ... The excellent photography by Santhosh Sivan [who was also the cameraman for Thalapathi] makes us appreciate the beauty we take for granted in the villages. The snow-capped mountains and flower-covered valleys of Kashmir are also an eyeful." Writing for The Indian Express, Malini Mannath compared Roja unfavourably to Held Hostage; she praised Arvind Swami's performance, calling him "dignified and natural", but criticised Madhubala's performance in the scenes where Roja pleads for her husband's rescue, saying, "Her tremulous whisper praying for help, sounds contrived". She also felt that Pankaj Kapoor looked "lost in his role", but lauded the cinematography by Santosh Sivan and the editing by Suresh Urs. T. N. Seshan, then the Chief Election Commissioner of India declared, "This is a film that every Tamilians should see." S. R. of Kalki applauded the film for Sivan's cinematography, Ratnam's direction, Rahman's music, humorous and strong dialogues, natural acting and story.

== Accolades ==
1993 National Film Awards (India)

- Won – Silver Lotus Award – Best Music Director – A. R. Rahman
- Won – Silver Lotus Award – Best Lyricist – Vairamuthu
- Won – Nargis Dutt Award for Best Feature Film on National Integration

Madhubala's performance took her close to winning in the category of Best Actress, but she eventually lost to Dimple Kapadia.

1993 Filmfare Awards South

- Won – Filmfare Best Movie Award (Tamil) – Roja
- Won – Filmfare Best Music Director Award (Tamil) – A. R. Rahman

1993 Tamil Nadu State Film Awards (India)

- Won – Tamil Nadu State Film Award for Best Film
- Won – Tamil Nadu State Film Award for Best Director – Mani Ratnam
- Won – Tamil Nadu State Film Award for Best Music Director – A. R. Rahman
- Won – Tamil Nadu State Film Award Special Prize – Madhubala
- Won – Tamil Nadu State Film Award for Best Female Playback Singer – Minmini

1993 Shantaram Awards

- Won – Best Director – Mani Ratnam

1993 Moscow International Film Festival (Russia)

- Nominated – Golden St. George (Best Film) – Mani Ratnam

Bite the Mango Film Festival (United Kingdom)

- Featured screening and premiere – Roja

Wangfujing Film Festival (Beijing)

- Special screening – Roja

Indian Film Week (Moscow)

- Screening in the category of "From the classics to the contemporary" – Roja
