= Conversations with Mani Ratnam =

2012 book by Baradwaj Rangan

- Author: Baradwaj Rangan
- Language: English
- Subject: Mani Ratnam
- Genre: Biography
- Published: 3 December 2012
- Publisher: Penguin Books
- Publication place: India
- Media type: Print
- Pages: 305
- ISBN: 978-81-84756-90-6

Conversations with Mani Ratnam is a 2012 Indian biographical book by the film critic and author Baradwaj Rangan, focusing on the career of the Tamil filmmaker Mani Ratnam. The book contains conversations between Rangan and Ratnam, discussing the latter's career as a director, producer, and screenwriter. It was published on 3 December 2012 by Penguin Books and received critical acclaim.

== Release ==
Conversations with Mani Ratnam was announced in October 2012. The book was yes released at Hilton Chennai, Chennai on 3 December that year by Penguin Books. An edition in Tamil was released in December 2013 under the title of Mani Ratnam Padaipukkal: Or Uraiyaadal (transl. Mani Ratnam's Work: A Conversation), with Badri Seshadri of Kizhakku Pathippagam publishing it and Aravind Satchidanandam working as the translator.

== Critical reception ==
Conversations with Mani Ratnam got positive reviews from critics. Writing for Mint newspaper, Sanjukta Sharma stated that the book has proved that a book with interview format "work", describing it as an "essential read for film lovers". Sandhya Rao of Business Line wrote, "The book sparkles because we have an insightful film critic who can write, and an introspective film-maker who is articulate ... In a sense, the book even works as a primer for those seriously into films." India Today's Kaveree Bamzai said the book had changed her perception of how a book of "conversations with famous people tend to be straightjacketed by too much respectfulness on the part of the interviewer and barely concealed boredom on the part of the interviewed." K. Hariharan from The Hindu singled out the "Iruvar" chapters, which he thought was the best one from the book.

Partha Basu, in her review for The Telegraph, observed: "Comfortably weighty because of the kind of paper used, it has a winning dust-jacket, an unusual double-column page lay-out, a host of photographs and film stills, and high-quality formatting. The total effect is comparable with the best in the business." Deepa Gahlot felt that "Rangan hits on a tone between fan and critic". In a review carried by the news magazine Tehelka, Arun Mani called it "a sometimes contentious, always fascinating pow-wow between critic and filmmaker". Renuka Bisht from The Financial Express termed to the book as "satisfying", but Madhavankutty Pillai from Open saw that, after the second half, the book got "boring and academic". Naman Ramachandran concluded, "The questions make for as much delightful reading as Ratnam’s answers, given that they are incredibly informed and analytical. When Rangan dives in and throws in the occasional bouncer, Ratnam is more than equal to the challenge, choosing either to dead bat it or knock it out of the park."
