= Ayngaran International =

Tamil film distribution company

- Native name: Tamil
- Type: Film production Film distribution
- Industry: Film Distribution
- Founded: Jan 14, 1987
- Headquarters: Thanikachalam Rd, Thillaiganga Nagar, Parthasarathi Puram, T. Nagar, Chennai, Tamil Nadu 600017
- Key people: K Karunamoorthi; Rohan Manickavasagar
- Revenue: $12 Million
- Number of employees: 67
- Website: Ayngaran

Ayngaran International is a film distribution and production company, based in the United Kingdom. The chairman of the company is K. Karunamoorthy.

== Logo ==
The Ayngaran International logo features a stylized symbol of Lord Ganesha, representing the Tamil film production and distribution company. The word Ayngaran is a Tamil name for Lord Ganesha meaning "the five-handed one" (referencing his four arms and trunk), making his depiction the centerpiece of the brand's identity. Throughout the late 1990s and 2000s, Ayngaran International used several iconic animated DVD and theatrical intros which showcase the Ganesha emblem accompanied by traditional South Indian instrumental music.

== History ==
=== Film production ===
In the 1980s and 1990s, Ayngaran International was the leading overseas distributor of Tamil films. The most prestigious productions sold for hundreds of thousands of rupees, and many enjoyed long runs on VHS.

Tamil films are generally released in eight major overseas territories: Malaysia, Singapore, United Arab Emirates, Europe, the United Kingdom, Australia and New Zealand, Canada and United States.

Ayngaran International has several retail stores across the world, located in cities such as London, Toronto, Paris, Sydney, and Singapore. Other partner sites are located in Sri Lanka and Malaysia.

The map of international territories expanded significantly in the 1990s. Trade experts attribute this growth in part to political instability in neighboring Sri Lanka. Many Sri Lankan Tamils emigrated to Canada and countries in Europe, and have since constituted the largest audience for Tamil films in the world.

These audiences also warmed to the directors and actors who were making their mark during this decade. “Around this time, there were several stars in the Tamil film industry, such as Vijayakanth, Karthik and Prabhu said K Vijayakumar, executive producer of Ayngaran International Film and Media Private Limited. “Mani Ratnam made Roja (1992), and S. Shankar's Gentleman (1993) in the early ’90s. Vijay and Ajith too emerged as stars around the latter part of the decade. It took the double star power of director Shankar and actor Kamal Haasan to break the overseas price record. The rights to distribute Indian went for Rs 1 crore in 1996“.

Ayngaran International made its first foray into film production with the 1996 horror film Karuppu Roja, directed by Aabavanan, but the venture's failure prompted them to prioritise European distribution ventures. In 2006, Ayngaran International entered into a joint venture with Eros International and announced plans to begin producing and distributing films on a larger scale. Its first distribution venture as a joint venture, Shankar's Rajinikanth-starrer Sivaji, became a very profitable venture and soon after, Ayngaran announced plans to begin producing films.

Ayngaran has also released numerous anthology DVDs featuring the best music videos and tracks by legendary composers such as A. R. Rahman (A.R. Rahman Hits) and Ilaiyaraaja.

Ayngaran played a pioneering role in the publishing and distribution of VHS tapes and then original DVDs of Tamil films (often digitally mastered with DTS, Inc. or Dolby Digital audio tracks.

Subsequently, it was announced that they would produce the director and actor's next collaboration, Enthiran (2010), dubbed as the most expensive Tamil film ever made, along with Eros International. However, in December 2008, Eros International withdrew from the joint venture after financial difficulties caused by the box-office failure of Drona (2008) and Yuvvraaj (2008), while Ayngaran International itself, struggled with the 2008 financial crisis.

The film's production and release rights were consequently sold on to Sun Pictures, who released the film.

After enjoying success as the worldwide co-distributors of the Ajith Kumar-starrer Billa (2007), they signed the actor on to appear in their production Aegan (2008), which was directed by Raju Sundaram. Simultaneously they produced Prabhu Deva's Villu (2009) with Vijay in the lead role, but both films did not perform well commercially.

The failure of both their big-budget films and their other venture Vishnuvardhan's Sarvam (2009), coupled with their withdrawal from Enthiran, put the release of several of their other projects into doubt. While smaller films like Peraanmai (2009) and Angadi Theru (2010) managed to release and perform well at the box office, other ventures including Mysskin's Nandalala (2010), Murattu Kaalai (2012) and the Prabhu Deva-starrer Kalavaadiya Pozhuthugal (2017) experienced severe delays as a result of financial restraints, however the latter got released in 2017.

Likewise Ayngaran's films shot in the late 2000s like the Jai-starrer Arjunan Kadhali and the Jeevan-starrer Krishnaleelai remain unreleased, while projects such as the A. R. Rahman musical, Kadhir's Manavar Dhinam with Vinay, were shelved after being launched.

The studio continued distributing films throughout the 2010s and made a return to production through Kaththi (2014), which was co-produced by Lyca Productions. The success of the film meant that Ayngaran International were actively looking to make a return to the film industry, and announced that they would finance Anand Shankar's Marma Manithan with Vikram and Kajal Aggarwal starring. However, subsequently they opted against making the film and the project was taken up by different producers.

With the decline of physical formats (VHS/DVD) and the rise of streaming, the company has moved a large portion of its extensive catalog to digital platforms and its official channel on Ayngaran – YouTube.

== Filmography ==
Ayngaran introduced the six-track DTS sound system to the Indian Cinema Industry through its inaugural production feature Karuppu Roja in 1996.

As Producer
Year	Film	Director	Cast
1996	Karuppu Roja	Paneer	Ramki, Vineetha
2008	Mayabazaar (Malayalam)	Thomas Sebastian	Mammootty, Sheela Kaur, Tisca Chopra
2008	Aegan	Raju Sundaram	Ajith Kumar, Nayanthara
2009	Villu	Prabhu Deva	Vijay, Nayanthara
2009	Sarvam	Vishnuvardhan	Arya, Trisha
2009	Peraanmai	S. P. Jananathan	Jayam Ravi, Vasundhara, Saranya, Liyasree, Dhansika, Varsha Ashwathi, Roland Kickinger
2010	Angadi Theru	Vasanthabalan	Mahesh, Anjali, A. Venkatesh
2010	Nandalala	Mysskin	Mysskin, Ashwath Ram, Snigdha Akolkar
2012	Murattu Kaalai	K. Selva Bharathy	Sundar C, Sneha, Sindhu Tolani
2017	Kalavaadiya Pozhuthugal	Thangar Bachan	Prabhu Deva, Bhumika Chawla, Prakash Raj
2024	Nirangal Moondru	Karthick Naren	Atharvaa, R. Sarathkumar, Rahman
2026	Anbil Avan	R. Kaarthikeyan	Ashok Selvan, Preity Mukhundhan, Sabumon Abdusamad, Revathi

=== Film distribution ===
Year	Film	Notes
1987	Chinna Poove Mella Pesu	
1987	Nayakan	
1987	Manithan	
1987	Ore Oru Gramathiley	
1988	Urimai Geetham	
1988	Kan Simittum Neram	
1988	Guru Sishyan	
1988	Agni Natchathiram	
1988	Kathanayagan	
1988	Enga Ooru Kavakkaran	
1988	Senthoorapoove	
1988	Dharmathin Thalaivan	
1988	Poovizhi Raja	
1989	En Purushanthaan Enakku Mattumthaan	
1989	Varusham 16	
1989	Rajadhi Raja	
1989	Andru Peytha Mazhaiyil	
1989	Apoorva Sagodharargal	
1989	Siva	
1989	Paandi Nattu Thangam	
1989	Karakattakkaran	
1989	Raja Chinna Roja	
1989	Mappillai	
1989	Aararo Aariraro	
1989	Manasukketha Maharasa	
1990	Panakkaran	
1990	Mounam Sammadham	
1990	Pondatti Thevai	
1990	Periya Veetu Pannakkaran	
1990	Anjali	
1990	Sirayil Pootha Chinna Malar	
1990	Inaindha Kaigal	
1990	My Dear Marthandan	
1990	Chatriyan	
1990	Pudhu Pudhu Ragangal	
1991	Sikaram	
1991	Eeramana Rojave	
1991	Dharma Durai	
1991	Kumbakarai Thangaiah	
1991	Vanakkam Vathiyare	
1991	Thanga Thamaraigal	
1991	Chinna Thambi	
1991	Enga Ooru Sippai	
1991	Marikozhundhu	
1991	Ennarukil Nee Irunthal	
1991	Maanagara Kaaval	
1991	Archana IAS	
1991	Nee Pathi Naan Pathi	
1991	Vasanthakala Paravai	
1991	Bramma	
1991	Rudhra	
1991	Thalapathi	
1991	Putham Pudhu Payanam	
1991	Nadigan	
1992	Amaran	
1992	Chinna Gounder	
1992	Mannan	
1992	Sundara Kandam	
1992	Vanna Vanna Pookkal	
1992	Kasthuri Manjal	
1992	Singaravelan	
1992	Chembaruthi	
1992	Chinnavar	
1992	Nadodi Pattukkaran	
1992	Vaaname Ellai	
1992	Chinna Marumagal	
1992	Aavarampoo	
1992	Sevagan	
1992	Amma Vandhachu	
1992	Annaamalai	
1992	Ponnuketha Purushan	
1992	Surieyan	
1992	Roja	
1992	Thalaivaasal	
1992	Deiva Vaakku	
1992	Pandian	
1992	Kaviya Thalaivan	
1992	Thirumathi Palanisamy	
1992	Thevar Magan	
1992	Natchathira Nayagan	
1992	Meera	
1993	Sinna Mapplai	
1993	Jaathi Malli	
1993	Maamiyar Veedu	
1993	Walter Vetrivel	
1993	Yajaman	
1993	Kalaignan	
1993	Ponnumani	
1993	Kattalai	
1993	Pudhiya Mugam	
1993	Thangakkili	
1993	Gokulam	
1993	Band Master	
1993	Athma	
1993	Parvathi Ennai Paradi	
1993	Gentleman	
1993	Udan Pirappu	
1993	Thalattu	
1993	Galatta Maappillai	Tamil Dubbed version of Allari Alludu
1993	Kilipetchu Ketkavaa	
1993	Kizhakku Cheemayile	
1993	Sabash Babu	
1993	Thiruda Thiruda	
1993	Uzhavan	
1994	Mahanadhi	
1994	Rajakumaran	
1994	Sethupathi IPS	
1994	Veetlile Visheshanga	
1994	Paasamalargal	
1994	Veettai Paaru Naattai Paaru	
1994	Athiradi Padai	
1994	Raasamahan	
1994	Adharmam	
1994	Honest Raj	
1994	Indhu	
1994	Sakthivel	
1994	Veera	
1994	Vandicholai Chinraasu	
1994	Chinna Durai Periya Durai	Tamil Dubbed version of Dongala Rajyam
1994	Oru Vasantha Geetham	
1994	Duet	
1994	Jaihind	
1994	Namma Annachi	
1994	Priyanka	
1994	Pathavi Pramanam	
1994	Manitha Manitha	Tamil Dubbed version of Gangmaster
1994	Sevatha Ponnu	
1994	Super Police	Tamil Dubbed version of same title
1994	Manasu Rendum Pudhusu	
1994	Seevalaperi Pandi	
1994	Maindhan	
1994	Rasigan	
1994	Chinna Madam	
1994	Pudhupatti Ponnuthayi	
1994	Vietnam Colony	
1994	Saadhu	
1994	Kanmani	
1994	Thozhar Pandian	
1994	Sarigamapadani	
1994	En Aasai Machan	
1994	Killadi Mappillai	
1994	May Maadham	
1994	Raja Pandi	
1994	Thai Maaman	
1994	Mudhal Payanam	
1994	Veeramani	
1994	Kaadhalan	
1994	Pudhusa Pootha Roosa	
1994	Ulavaali	
1994	Sabash Ramu	Tamil Dubbed version of Muddula Priyudu
1994	Kaadhalan	
1994	Mr Maharani	Tamil Dubbed version of Maga Rayudu
1994	Mani Rathnam	
1994	Nammavar	
1994	Nattamai	
1994	Pavithra	
1994	Periya Marudhu	
1994	Karuthamma	
1994	Veera Padhakkam	
1994	Nila	
1994	Pudhiya Mannargal	
1994	Thaai Manasu	
1994	Chinna Pulla	
1994	Vanaja Girija	
1995	Karuppu Nila	
1995	Baashha	
1995	Kattumarakaran	
1995	Naan Petha Magane	
1995	Oru Oorla Oru Rajakumari	
1995	Paattu Paadava	
1995	Deva	
1995	Muthu Kalai	
1995	Bombay	
1995	Aanazhagan	
1995	Karnaa	
1995	Lucky Man	
1995	Killadi Raja	Tamil Dubbed version of Gharana Bullodu
1995	Indira	
1995	Thirumoorthy	
1995	Chinna Vathiyar	
1995	Murai Maaman	
1995	Nandhavana Theru	
1995	Villadhi Villain	
1995	Ellame En Kadhali	Tamil Dubbed version of Criminal
1995	Pullakuttikaran	
1995	Raasaiyya	
1995	Periya Kudumbam	
1995	Aasai	
1995	Mr. Madras	
1995	Rangeela	Tamil Dubbed version of same title
1995	Mouna Yudham	Tamil Dubbed version of Mounam
1995	Chutti Kuzhandhai	Tamil Dubbed version of Sisindri
1995	Makkal Aatchi	
1995	Muthu	
1995	Neela Kuyil	
1995	Maa Manithan	
1995	Seethanam	
1995	Ayudha Poojai	
1995	Maaman Magal	
1995	Varraar Sandiyar	
1995	Veeraputhran	Tamil Dubbed version of Rikshavodu
1995	Dear Son Maruthu	
1996	Coimbatore Mappille	
1996	Love Birds	
1996	Parambarai	
1996	Ullathai Allitha	
1996	Vaanmathi	
1996	Vaikarai Pookkal	
1996	Take It Easy Urvashi	
1996	Amman Kovil Vaasalile	
1996	Meendum Savithri	
1996	Nattupura Pattu	
1996	Poove Unakkaga	
1996	Musthaffaa	
1996	Vasantha Vaasal	
1996	Irattai Roja	
1996	Devaraagam	Tamil Dubbed version of same title
1996	Maanbumigu Maanavan	
1996	Siraichalai	Tamil Dubbed version of Kaalapani
1996	Kaalam Maari Pochu	
1996	Rajali	
1996	Sengottai	
1996	Indian	
1996	Pudhu Nilavu	
1996	Krishna	
1996	Avathara Purushan	
1996	Kadhal Kottai	
1996	Tamizh Selvan	
1996	Poovarasan	
1996	Enakkoru Magan Pirappan	
1996	Mahaan	Tamil Dubbed version of The Prince
1996	Kadhal Desam	
1996	Mettukudi	
1996	Sivasakthi	
1996	Subash	
1996	Tata Birla	
1996	Unnaiye Kalyanam Pannikiren	Tamil Dubbed version of Ninne Pelladata
1996	Andha Naal	
1996	Alexander	
1996	Avvai Shanmugi	
1996	Gokulathil Seethai	
1996	Kalki	
1996	Mr. Romeo	
1996	Senathipathi	
1996	Gopala Gopala	
1996	Poomani	
1996	Karuppu Roja	
1997	College Galatta	Tamil Dubbed version of Chinnabbayi
1997	Sakthi	
1997	Dharma Chakkaram	
1997	Iruvar	
1997	Kaalamellam Kaathiruppen	
1997	Kathirunda Kadhal	
1997	Minsara Kanavu	
1997	Nalla Manasukkaran	
1997	Periya Thambi	
1997	Bharathi Kannamma	
1997	Nesam	
1997	Kaalamellam Kadhal Vaazhga	
1997	Ettupatti Rasa	
1997	Mappillai Gounder	
1997	Vivasaayi Magan	
1997	Arunachalam	
1997	Thaali Pudhusu	
1997	Dhinamum Ennai Gavani	
1997	Raasi	
1997	Vallal	
1997	Sishya	
1997	Adimai Changili	
1997	Love Today	
1997	Pistha	
1997	Ullaasam	
1997	Pasamulla Pandiyare	
1997	Devathai	
1997	Surya Vamsam	
1997	Once More	
1997	V. I. P.	
1997	Nandhini	
1997	Kaadhali	
1997	Pagaivan	
1997	Aanandham Aarambam	Tamil Dubbed version of Katha Nayakan
1997	Periya Idathu Mappillai	
1997	Raman Abdullah	
1997	Abhimanyu	
1997	Kalyana Vaibhogam	
1997	Nerrukku Ner	
1997	Ganga Gowri	
1997	Aahaa Enna Porutham	
1997	Aahaa	
1997	Periya Manushan	
1997	Porkkaalam	
1997	Ratchagan	
1997	Thedinen Vanthathu	
1997	Vasuke	
1997	Vidukathai	
1997	Janakiraman	
1997	Poochudava	
1997	Arasiyal	
1997	Rettai Jadai Vayasu	
1997	Kadhalukku Mariyadhai	
1998	Moovendhar	
1998	Kaadhale Nimmadhi	
1998	Maru Malarchi	
1998	Naam Iruvar Namakku Iruvar	
1998	Ponmanam	
1998	Ulavuthurai	
1998	Police Killadi	Tamil Dubbed version of Aavida Maa Aavide
1998	Kondattam	
1998	Dhinamdhorum	
1998	Bhagavath Singh	
1998	Swarnamukhi	
1998	Kangalin Vaarthaigal	
1998	Vaettiya Madichu Kattu	
1998	Thulli Thirintha Kaalam	
1998	Ini Ellam Sugame	
1998	Thalaivaa	Tamil Dubbed version of Sivayya
1998	Ponnu Velayira Bhoomi	
1998	Santhosham	
1998	Kaathala Kaathala	
1998	Ninaithen Vandhai	
1998	Jeans	
1998	Autokkaran	Tamil Dubbed version of Auto Driver
1998	Jolly	
1998	Aval Varuvala	
1998	Iniyavale	
1998	Priyamudan	
1998	Natpukkaga	
1998	Dharma	
1998	Poonthottam	
1998	Anandha Mazhai	Tamil Dubbed version of Tholi Prema
1998	Kalyana Galatta	
1998	Sollamale	
1998	Unnidathil Ennai Koduthen	
1998	Uyire..	Tamil Dubbed version of Dil Se..
1998	Ellame En Pondattithaan	
1998	Aasai Thambi	
1998	Simmarasi	
1998	Veeram Vilanja Mannu	
1998	Pudhumai Pithan	
1998	Guru Paarvai	
1998	Aranmanaikaran	Tamil Dubbed version of Kottaram Veettile Apputtan
1998	Pooveli	
1998	Kaadhal Kavithai	
1999	Surya Parvai	
1999	Ponnu Veetukkaran	
1999	Thullatha Manamum Thullum	
1999	Chathriya Dharmam	Tamil Dubbed version of Seetharama Raju
1999	Kallazhagar	
1999	Ninaivirukkum Varai	
1999	Unnai Thedi	
1999	Chinna Raja	
1999	Padayappa	
1999	Nilave Mugam Kaattu	
1999	Poomagal Oorvalam	
1999	Nenjinile	
1999	Viralukketha Veekkam	
1999	Rojavanam	
1999	Poovellam Kettuppar	
1999	Taalam	Tamil Dubbed version of Taal
1999	Nee Varuvai Ena	
1999	Jodi	
1999	Unakkaga Ellam Unakkaga	
1999	Shankar	Tamil Dubbed version of Ravoyi Chandamama
1999	Hello	
1999	Kannupada Poguthaiya	
1999	Mudhalvan	
1999	Pudhu Kudithanam	
1999	Time	
1999	Unnaruge Naan Irundhal	
1999	Paattali	
2000	Kannukkul Nilavu	
2000	Vaanathaippola	
2000	Eazhaiyin Sirippil	
2000	Alai Payuthey	
2000	Mugavaree	
2000	Vallarasu	
2000	James Pandu	
2000	Kandukondain Kandukondain	
2000	Kushi	
2000	Appu	
2000	Ennamma Kannu	
2000	Vetri Kodi Kattu	
2000	Pennin Manathai Thottu	
2000	Kuberan	
2000	Parthen Rasithen	
2000	Bharathi	
2000	Budget Padmanabhan	
2000	Rhythm	
2000	Uyirile Kalanthathu	
2000	Priyamaanavale	
2000	Thenali	
2000	Snegithiye	
2000	Ennavalle	
2001	Dheena	
2001	Friends	
2001	Paapa	Tamil Dubbed version of Devi Putrudu
2001	Minnale	
2001	Ullam Kollai Poguthae	
2001	Rishi	
2001	Paarvai Ondre Pothume	
2001	Vinnukum Mannukum	
2001	Badri	
2001	Dumm Dumm Dumm	
2001	Little John	
2001	Aanandham	
2001	Citizen	
2001	Lovely	
2001	Dhill	
2001	Star	
2001	Poovellam Un Vaasam	
2001	Vedham	
2001	Samudhiram	
2001	Chocklet	
2001	Alli Thandha Vaanam	
2001	Pandavar Bhoomi	
2001	12B	
2001	Aalavandhan	
2001	Manadhai Thirudivittai	
2001	Nandhaa	
2001	Paarthale Paravasam	
2001	Shahjahan	
2001	Thavasi	
2001	Kasi	
2001	Majunu	
2002	Alli Arjuna	
2002	Azhagi	
2002	Pammal K. Sambandam	
2002	Punnagai Desam	
2002	Red	
2002	Vivaramana Aalu	
2002	Dhaya	
2002	Kannathil Muthamittal	
2002	Kamarasu	
2002	Roja Kootam	
2002	Gemini	
2002	Raajjiyam	
2002	Thamizh	
2002	Thamizhan	
2002	Junior Senior	
2002	Varushamellam Vasantham	
2002	Unnai Ninaithu	
2002	Enge Enadhu Kavithai	
2002	123	
2002	Devan	
2002	Ezhumalai	
2002	Thenkasi Pattanam	
2002	Panchatanthiram	
2002	Raja	
2002	Samurai	
2002	Yai! Nee Romba Azhaga Irukey!	
2002	Youth	
2002	Karmegham	
2002	Baba	
2002	Run	
2002	Arputham	
2002	Maaran	
2002	Namma Veetu Kalyanam	
2002	Jjunction	
2002	Five Star	
2002	Kadhal Azhivathillai	
2002	April Maadhathil	
2002	I Love You Da	
2002	Mutham	
2002	Bala	
2002	Kadhal Virus	
2002	Virumbukiren	
2003	Dhool	
2003	Anbe Sivam	
2003	Pallavan	
2003	Manasellam	
2003	Dum	
2003	Arasu	
2003	Punnagai Poove	
2003	Anbe Anbe	
2003	Pudhiya Geethai	
2003	Lesa Lesa	
2003	Parthiban Kanavu	
2003	Parasuram	
2003	Nala Damayanthi	
2003	Paarai	
2003	Whistle	
2003	Priyamaana Thozhi	
2003	Thayumanavan	
2003	Kaakha Kaakha	
2003	Thithikkudhe	
2003	Vikadan	
2003	Thennavan	
2003	Diwan	
2003	Boys	
2003	Alai	
2003	Winner	
2003	Anjaneya	
2003	Ottran	
2003	Thirumalai	
2003	Jay Jay	
2003	Kurumbu	
2003	Konji Pesalaam	
2003	Enakku 20 Unakku 18	
2003	Joot	
2003	Thathi Thavadhu Manasu	
2003	Indru	
2003	Sindhamal Sitharamal	
2003	Kadhal Kirukkan	
2004	Engal Anna	
2004	Kovil	
2004	Pudhukottaiyilirundhu Saravanan	
2004	Virumaandi	
2004	Thendral	
2004	Pura	Tamil Dubbed version of Kanninum Kannadikkum
2004	Varnajalam	
2004	Autograph	
2004	Kangalal Kaidhu Sei	
2004	Gambeeram	
2004	Jairam	Tamil partial version of Jai
2004	Kuthu	
2004	Ghilli	
2004	Aethirree	
2004	Arul	
2004	Perazhagan	
2004	Aayutha Ezhuthu	
2004	Jore	
2004	Maanasthan	
2004	Machi	
2004	Shock	
2004	Azhagiya Theeye	
2004	Arivumani	
2004	Vasool Raja MBBS	
2004	Madhurey	
2004	Chellamae	
2004	Arasatchi	
2004	Gajendra	
2004	Giri	
2004	Bose	
2004	7/G Rainbow Colony	
2004	Neranja Manasu	
2004	Attahasam	
2004	Chatrapathy	
2004	Dreams	
2004	Manmadhan	
2004	Maha Nadigan	
2004	Aai	
2004	Jai Soorya	
2004	Kaadhal	
2004	Veeran	Tamil Dubbed version of Mass
2005	Aayudham	
2005	Devathaiyai Kanden	
2005	Thirupaachi	
2005	Iyer IPS	
2005	Kannadi Pookal	
2005	Sukran	
2005	Kadhal FM	
2005	Mannin Maindhan	
2005	Kannadi Pookal	
2005	Raam	
2005	Maayavi	
2005	London	
2005	Kicha Vayasu 16	
2005	Girivalam	
2005	Thaka Thimi Tha	
2005	Sevvel	
2005	Chandramukhi	
2005	Sachein	
2005	Mumbai Xpress	
2005	Jithan	
2005	Karkaa Kasadara	
2005	6′.2″	
2005	Kana Kandaen	
2005	Amudhae	
2005	Power of Women	
2005	Ullam Ketkumae	
2005	Anniyan	
2005	Englishkaran	
2005	Kaatrullavarai	
2005	Chinna	
2005	Priyasakhi	
2005	Daas	
2005	Selvam	
2005	ABCD	
2005	Ponniyin Selvan	
2005	Chidambarathil Oru Appasamy	
2005	Oru Naal Oru Kanavu	
2005	Anbe Aaruyire	
2005	Thotti Jaya	
2005	Kundakka Mandakka	
2005	Kasthuri Maan	
2005	Adhu Oru Kana Kaalam	
2005	Sivakasi	
2005	Majaa	
2005	Bambara Kannaley	
2005	Rajamanikyam	Tamil Dubbed version of same title
2005	Kanda Naal Mudhal	
2005	Aaru	
2005	Sandakozhi	
2005	Deva	Tamil Dubbed version of Jai Chiranjeeva
2006	Lakshmi	Tamil Dubbed version of same title
2006	Paramasivan	
2006	Aathi	
2006	Pasakiligal	
2006	Dishyum	
2006	Chithiram Pesuthadi	
2006	Idhayathirudan	
2006	Kodambakkam	
2006	Kalabha Kadhalan	
2006	Madrasi	
2006	Thambi	
2006	Pattiyal	
2006	Thirupathi	
2006	Thalainagaram	
2006	Parijatham	
2006	Makkal Dalapathy	Tamil Dubbed version of Prajapathi
2006	Imsai Arasan 23rd Pulikecei	
2006	Unakkum Enakkum	
2006	Nee Venunda Chellam	
2006	Vettaiyaadu Vilaiyaadu	
2006	Em Magan	
2006	Jambhavan	
2006	Sillunu Oru Kaadhal	
2006	Boss	Tamil Dubbed version of same title
2006	Kedi	
2006	Dharmapuri	
2006	E	
2006	Varalaru	
2006	Thalaimagan	
2006	Vallavan	
2006	Vathiyar	
2006	Rendu	
2006	Chennai Kadhal	
2006	Nenjirukkum Varai	
2006	Thiruvilaiyaadal Aarambam	
2006	Veyil	
2006	Poi	
2007	Guru	Tamil Dubbed version of same title
2007	Aalwar	
2007	Pokkiri	
2007	Thaamirabharani	
2007	Deepavali	
2007	Pori	
2007	Pachaikili Muthucharam	
2007	Paruthiveeran	
2007	Thirumagan	
2007	Koodal Nagar	
2007	Unnale Unnale	
2007	Naan Avan Illai	
2007	Mudhal Kanave	
2007	Parattai Engira Azhagu Sundaram	
2007	Karuppusamy Kuththagaithaarar	
2007	Sivaji: The Boss	
2007	Viyabari	
2007	Kireedam	
2007	Thozhan	Tamil Dubbed version of Sooryan
2007	Aarya	
2007	Marudhamalai	
2007	Satham Podathey	
2007	Malaikottai	
2007	Azhagiya Tamil Magan	
2007	Vel	
2007	Billa	
2007	Don	Tamil Dubbed version of same title
2008	Bheemaa	
2008	Kaalai	
2008	Pazhani	
2008	Pirivom Santhippom	
2008	Sadhu Miranda	
2008	Anjathe	
2008	Yaaradi Nee Mohini	
2008	Nepali	
2008	Santosh Subramaniam	
2008	Arai En 305-il Kadavul	
2008	Kuruvi	
2008	Pandi	
2008	Dasavathaaram	
2008	Muniyandi Vilangial Moonramandu	
2008	Subramaniapuram	
2008	Kuselan	
2008	Satyam	
2008	Dhaam Dhoom	
2008	Saroja	
2008	Kadhalil Vizhunthen	
2008	Mayabazar	Tamil Dubbed version of same title
2008	Durai	
2008	Seval	
2008	Aegan	
2008	Vaaranam Aayiram	
2008	Thenavattu	
2008	Dindigul Sarathy	
2008	Silambattam	
2008	Abhiyum Naanum	
2008	Thiruvannamalai	
2008	Pudhukottai Azhagan	Tamil Dubbed version of King
2009	Villu	
2009	Padikkadavan	
2009	Vennila Kabadi Kuzhu	
2009	Naan Kadavul	
2009	Siva Manasula Sakthi	
2009	TN 07 AL 4777	
2009	Aayirathil Oruvan	Tamil Dubbed version of same title
2009	Ayan	
2009	Guru En Aalu	
2009	Pasanga	
2009	Sarvam	
2009	Maasilamani	
2009	Crime File	Tamil Dubbed version of Rahasya Police
2009	Naadodigal	
2009	Pokkisham	
2009	Kanthaswamy	
2009	Unnaipol Oruvan	
2009	Peraanmai	
2009	Aadhavan	
2009	Naan Avan Illai 2	
2009	Kandhakottai	
2010	Nil Kavani Ennai Kadhali	Tamil Dubbed version of Black Stallion
2010	Aayirathil Oruvan	
2010	Jaggubhai	
2010	Tamizh Padam	
2010	Aasal	
2010	Vinnaithaandi Varuvaayaa	
2010	Aval Peyar Thamizharasi	
2010	Kacheri Aarambam	
2010	Angadi Theru	
2010	Sura	
2010	Singam	
2010	Raavanan	
2010	Kalavani	
2010	Madrasapattinam	
2010	Thillalangadi	
2010	Baana Kaathadi	
2010	Vamsam	
2010	Naan Mahaan Alla	
2010	Bale Pandiya	
2010	Boss Engira Bhaskaran	
2010	Vandae Maatharam	
2010	Enthiran	
2010	Mynaa	
2010	Uthamaputhiran	
2010	Nandalala	
2011	Aadukalam	
2011	Kaavalan	
2011	Aadu Puli	
2011	Seedan	
2011	Ko	
2011	Avan Ivan	
2011	Nootrenbadhu	
2011	Venghai	
2011	Deiva Thirumagal	
2011	Kanchana	
2011	Yuvan Yuvathi	
2011	Mankatha	
2011	Engaeyum Eppothum	
2011	Vandhaan Vendraan	
2011	Velayudham	
2011	Poraali	
2011	Osthe	
2011	Mambattiyan	
2011	Mouna Guru	
2012	Vettai	
2012	Muppozhudhum Un Karpanaigal	
2012	Kaattu Puli	Tamil partial version of This Weekend
2012	Maasi	
2012	3	
2012	Oru Kal Oru Kannadi	
2012	Leelai	
2012	Marupadiyum Oru Kadhal	
2012	Murattu Kaalai	
2012	Saguni	
2012	Billa II	
2012	Podaa Podi	
2012	Neerparavai	
2012	Neethaane En Ponvasantham	
2013	Kanna Laddu Thinna Aasaiya	
2013	David	
2013	Vishwaroopam	
2013	Singam II	
2013	Thalaivaa	
2013	Naiyaandi	
2013	Arrambam	
2013	All in All Azhagu Raja	
2013	Jannal Oram	
2013	Endrendrum Punnagai	
2014	Rummy	
2014	Jilla	
2014	Goli Soda	
2014	Nimirndhu Nil	
2014	Maan Karate	
2014	Naan Sigappu Manithan	
2014	Travel La Oru Kadhal	
2014	Tenaliraman	
2014	Vallavanukku Pullum Aayudham	
2014	Uyirukku Uyiraga	
2014	Uyirvarai Iniththaai	
2014	Anjaan	
2014	Aranmanai	
2014	Madras	
2014	Kaththi	
2014	Oru Oorla Rendu Raja	
2014	Meaghamann	
2015	Yennai Arindhaal	
2015	Anegan	
2015	Vai Raja Vai	
2015	Maari	
2015	Chandi Veeran	
2015	Vaalu	
2015	Puli	
2015	Naanum Rowdy Dhaan	
2015	Vedalam	
2015	Eetti	
2016	Rajinimurugan	
2016	Kathakali	
2016	Gethu	
2016	Tharai Thappattai	
2016	Jil Jung Juk	
2016	Miruthan	
2016	Pugazh	
2016	Enakku Innoru Per Irukku	
2016	Kabali	
2016	Thodari	
2016	Remo	
2016	Achcham Yenbadhu Madamaiyada	
2016	Kannula Kaasa Kattappa	
2017	Kalavaadiya Pozhuthugal	
2017	Velaikkaran	
2018	Diya	
2018	Kaala	
2018	Genius	
2020	Draupathi	
2021	Enemy	
2021	Thuneri	
2022	Poikkal Kudhirai	
2022	Thiruchitrambalam	
2022	Naane Varuvean	
2023	Dada	
2023	Single Shankarum Smartphone Simranum	
2023	Agilan	
2023	Munthirikkaadu	
2023	Yaathisai	
2023	Kazhuvethi Moorkkan	
2023	Jailer	
2023	Karumegangal Kalaigindrana	
2023	Mark Antony	
2023	Ulagammai	
2023	Aathmika	
2024	Local Sarakku	
2024	Arimapatti Sakthivel	
2024	Romeo	
2024	Vallavan Vaguthadhada	
2024	Rathnam	
2024	Ingu Mirugangal Vaazhum Idam	
2024	PT Sir	
2024	Raayan	
2024	Veerayi Makkal	
2024	Vaazhai	
2024	Aaryamala	
2024	Brother	
2024	Bloody Beggar	
2024	Paraman	
2024	Nirangal Moondru	
2024	Miss You	
2025	Poorveegam	
2025	Dinasari	
2025	Sabdham	
2025	Devil's Double Next Level	
2025	Good Day	
2025	Akkenam	
2025	Paranthu Po	
2025	Coolie	
2025	Thanal	
2025	Madurai 16	
2025	Thandakaaranyam	
2025	Right	
2025	Sareeram	
2025	Thadai Athai Udai	
2025	Ram Abdullah Antony	
2025	Aaromaley	
2025	Retta Thala	
2026	Draupathi 2	
2026	Youth	
2026	Kaalidas 2	
2026	Kara	
2026	Ananthan Kaadu	
2026	DC	
2026	Sandakari	
2026	Anbil Avan	
2026	Mookuthi Amman 2	
