= Vaseegara =

- Theatrical release poster
- Directed by: K. Selva Bharathy
- Screenplay by: K. Selva Bharathy
- Story by: Trivikram Srinivas
- Based on: Nuvvu Naaku Nachav (Telugu)
- Starring: Vijay; Sneha
- Cinematography: Balasubramaniem
- Edited by: N. Ganesh Kumar; R. R. Eshwar
- Music by: S. A. Rajkumar
- Production company: Shots N' Stills Ltd
- Distributed by: Satya Movies
- Release date: 14 January 2003
- Running time: 176 minutes
- Country: India
- Language: Tamil

Vaseegara (transl. Magical Charmer) is a 2003 Indian Tamil-language romantic comedy film written and directed by K. Selva Bharathy. It is the Tamil remake of the 2001 Telugu film, Nuvvu Naaku Nachav. The film stars Vijay and Sneha in the lead roles, while Vadivelu, Gayatri Jayaraman, Nassar and Manivannan play supporting roles. The film's title is based on a song of the same name from Minnale (2001). It was released on 14 January 2003, during Pongal.

== Plot ==
Bhoopathy is a happy-go-lucky youth from Pollachi who is sent by his father Mani Gounder to stay with his best friend Vishwanathan at Villivakkam, Chennai, so that he can get a job and behave responsibly. Priya is Vishwanathan's daughter who is engaged to an NRI groom Prakash. Priya and Bhoopathy are at loggerheads and constantly fight and play pranks on each other. Soon, however, Priya falls for Bhoopathy. While Bhoopathy also loves Priya back, he realises that she is already engaged to another man and is also reminded of his father's words that he (Bhoopathy) should not make him (father) lose face with his friend under any circumstances. With this in mind, he starts to keep a distance from Priya and decides to return to Pollachi, only to be stopped by Vishwanathan.

Some days later, Priya and Bhoopathy, along with Priya's younger cousin sister Pappi, go to Ooty to attend the wedding of Priya's friend Asha. At Ooty, Bhoopathy attends the bachelor party of the groom Sriman. While drunk, he reveals his feelings about Priya. After the marriage, Bhoopathy, Priya and Pappi, along with a photographer Ganesh, go on a day-out to Black Thunder, where Ganesh takes a photo of Bhoopathy and Priya holding hands. Bhoopathy keeps snubbing Priya and her romantic overtures to him during the trip as he is reminded of his promise to his father but cannot forget her.

On the day before Priya's wedding, Mani arrives in Chennai and knows about the relationship between Bhoopathy and Priya. Later that night, Prakash and his family see the photo of Bhoopathy and Priya holding hands and Prakash's father Chandrasekhar decides to call off the wedding unless Vishwanathan can pay ₹1 crore to him, which Vishwanathan refuses to do. When Vishwanathan confronts Priya, Priya's aunt Lakshmi, who is aware of the love Priya has for Bhoopathy as well as Bhoopathy's dilemma, reveals the truth to Vishwanathan. Meanwhile, Bhoopathy is at the railway station, trying to convince Prakash to marry Priya. Vishwanathan, who has also arrived at the railway station, sees this, and realising the true reasons behind Bhoopathy backing out over his love for Priya, sends Prakash and his family away and accepts Bhoopathy's relationship with Priya. In the end, Bhoopathy marries Priya.

== Cast ==
- Vijay as Bhoopathy
- Sneha as Priya
- Nassar as Vishwanathan, Priya’s father
- Vadivelu as Kattabomman, Vishwanathan's house servant
- Suhasini Maniratnam as Lakshmi, Vishwanathan's sister
- Meera Krishnan as Parvathi, Priya’s mother
- Manivannan as Mani Gounder, Bhoopathy's father
- Gayatri Jayaraman as Asha, Priya's friend
- Sriman as Sriman, Asha's husband
- Vasu Vikram as Sundaram, Priya's uncle
- Manochithra as Padma, Priya's aunt
- Nizhalgal Ravi as Chandrasekhar
- Mayilswamy as Moorthy, Chandrasekhar's relative
- Bava Lakshmanan as Chandrasekhar's relative
- Kamalesh as Prakash, Priya's fiance
- Pandiarajan as Ganesh (guest appearance)

Uncredited

- Bonda Mani as Auto Driver
- Scissor Manohar as Ticket collector
- Siva Narayana Murthy as Train passenger
- Chaplin Balu as Wedding guest
- Vellai Subbaiah as Wedding priest
- Shobi (guest appearance in the song "Oru Thadavai Solvaya")
- Kottai Perumal as Mani's friend

== Production ==
K. Selva Bharathy, who had worked previously with Vijay in two Tamil remakes, Ninaithen Vandhai (1998) and Priyamaanavale (2000), opted to remake the 2001 Telugu hit Nuvvu Naaku Nachav into Tamil with his previous film Priyamaanavale's lead actor Vijay retained. The remake's title Vaseegara was derived a song from Minnale (2001). Sneha was signed on to as the lead actress, acting with Vijay for the first time. Gayatri Jayaraman was also signed on to play a supporting role. A song from the film was canned in New Zealand, while scenes were shot at Birla Planetarium and MGM Dizzee world. Unlike the Telugu original which did not have any fight sequences, Tamil version included a fight sequence.

== Soundtrack ==
Vaseegara's soundtrack was composed by S. A. Rajkumar, which marked his fourth and final collaboration with Vijay after Poove Unakkaga, Thullatha Mananum Thullum and Priyamaanavale. The audio rights were acquired by Hungama South & Music is Future.

Song	Artist	Lyrics
"Aaha En Parkal"	Shankar Mahadevan	Pa. Vijay
"Poopola Theepola"	Hariharan	Na. Muthukumar
"Oru Thadavai Solvaya"	Hariharan, Chinmayi	Na. Muthukumar
"Marriage Endral"	Karthik	Pa. Vijay
"Nenjam Oru Murai"	Srinivas, Mahalakshmi Iyer	Pa. Vijay
"Venaam Venaam"	Udit Narayan, Sadhana Sargam	Na. Muthukumar

== Release ==
Vaseegara was released on 14 January 2003, during Pongal. The film grossed around ₹8 crore during its lifetime, and India Today estimated it suffered a loss of ₹5 crore (equivalent to ₹20 crore or US$2.1 million in 2026).

== Critical reception ==
Sify appreciated the film as a welcome break from the masala films Vijay was known for and also praised the music, adding, "If you like to see a good love story and if you are a Vijay fan then go ahead and see it". Ananda Vikatan rated the film 41 out of 100. Visual Dasan of Kalki wrote even if you remove the small flaws, Vaseegara is half a poem and the rest is prose. Malini Mannath of Chennai Online wrote "The film opens interestingly enough, the earlier scenes being lively and enjoyable. It’s more to do with the characterisation of the hero than the situations. [..] But then the narration proceeds on the same plane, there are hardly any exciting moments in the script, and it all becomes a bit too monotonous in the end".

Indiainfo wrote, "Though the storyline is very thin it is the presentation that is refreshing. Director Selvabharathy has done commendable job. Though Vijay is no match to Venkatesh, he has given honest performance. Sneha is okay. Music by S A Rajkumar fails to rise above the ordinary, while the cinematography by Balasubramaniam deserves mention. Gayathri Jayaram, the other heroine, has nothing but couple of scenes". Cinesouth wrote "There is nothing remarkably different about this film from all his [Vijay] other recent releases. Its the usual single-lined story, a soggy screenplay and a very ordinary direction". Deccan Herald wrote "The script is a bit different from the normal romantic films and the director has treated the subject well. However, at times one can see the shades of overacting by the lead characters in trying to evoke laughter".
