= Red label =

Red label may refer to:

- Toxicity label
- A Scotch whisky from Johnnie Walker
- Red Label (2026 film), a 2026 Tamil film by K. R. Vinoth
- A tea made by Brooke Bond
