= Murattu Kaalai (1980 film) =

1980 film by S. P. Muthuraman

- Poster
- Directed by: S. P. Muthuraman
- Written by: Panchu Arunachalam
- Produced by: M. Kumaran; M. Saravanan; M. Balasubramaniam
- Starring: Rajinikanth; Rati Agnihotri; Sumalatha; Jaishankar
- Cinematography: Babu
- Edited by: R. Vittal
- Music by: Ilaiyaraaja
- Production company: AVM Productions
- Release date: 20 December 1980
- Running time: 144 minutes
- Country: India
- Language: Tamil

Murattu Kaalai (transl. Raging Bull) is a 1980 Indian Tamil-language action film directed by S. P. Muthuraman, and written by Panchu Arunachalam. The film stars Rajinikanth, Rati Agnihotri, Sumalatha and Jaishankar. It revolves around Kaalaiyan, an honourable villager who, despite being wealthy, chooses to live modestly while Sundaravelu, a less honourable man from the neighbouring village, tries to grab Kaalaiyan's land.

Murattu Kaalai was the first film for Rajinikanth with AVM Productions, and the company's re-entry into Tamil cinema after a long sabbatical since A. V. Meiyappan, the founder of AVM Productions died in 1979 with his sons taking over the production business. It was released on 20 December 1980 and became the highest grossing Tamil film of that year. The film was also instrumental in establishing Rajinikanth as both an action hero and superstar. It was remade again in Tamil under the same title and released in 2012.

== Plot ==
Kaalaiyan, a well-to-do and honourable landlord, lives modestly with his four brothers in a village. Sundaravelu is an equally rich but vicious landlord in the neighbouring village. He is obsessed with Kaalaiyan's property and sends his assistant Saamipillai to him with an offer to buy his property.

Kaalaiyan refuses to sell his property. Saamipillai, knowing well that Kaalaiyan is the best jallikattu player around, advises to Sundaravelu to organise a jallikattu game in the village festival and announce the reward as his sister Soundaryam's hand in marriage. Kaalaiyan wins, but refuses to marry Soundaryam as he is aware of Sundaravelu's devious plan, thus disappointing Soundaryam, who loved him, and also insulting Sundaravelu. Further, Kalaiyan had heard Soundaryam talking to her friends about separating Kalaiyan from his brothers after marriage, thus cementing his decision.

Sundaravelu falls in love with Kannamma, a girl of his village and proposes to her. When she refuses, he tries to molest her and she comes to Kaalaiyan seeking protection. Kaalaiyan allows her to stay at his house. She takes care of all the domestic work and impresses Kaalaiyan's brothers. When the villagers talk ill of Kannamma, Kaalaiyan's brothers decide to get Kannamma and Kaalaiyan married. To stop the wedding, Sundaravelu, at the instigation of Saamipillai, sends his henchman Sangili, who previously killed Kannamma's father, to fight Kaalaiyan. Kaalaiyan subdues Sangili but spares him.

Sundaravelu kills Sangili and frames Kaalaiyan. The police arrive at Kaalaiyan's marriage venue to arrest him. He escapes and hides in a forest. Soundaryam, coming to know about the misdeeds of her brother and his plans to destroy Kaalaiyan, argues with her brother and goes to the forest in search of Kaalaiyan. She finds him and reveals the truth. Sundaravelu, who had secretly followed Soundaryam to the forest, fights Kaalaiyan and takes his knife to kill him, but ends up killing Soundaryam, who came between the two.

Kaalaiyan is again framed for murder by Sundaravelu, the police intensify their search and a team of officers reach the forest. One of them is Sundaravelu's man and he attacks an officer. The corrupt officer assumes he is dead and leaves the place, but Kaalaiyan finds and saves him. Sundaravelu learns that the attacked officer survived and sends a group of thugs to attack Kaalaiyan when he is travelling in a train. Kaalaiyan fights the thugs and subdues them all; he forces one of them to inform Sundaravelu that Kaalaiyan and the policeman are dead.

During Sundaravelu's birthday party celebrations, Kaalaiyan and Kannamma come there disguised as dancers. When Sundaravelu gifts them money, Kaalaiyan reveals his true identity. A fight ensues, until a team of police officers arrives to arrest Sundaravelu for his crimes. When he demands witnesses and proof for his crimes, Saamipillai comes forward and agrees to give all the evidence, revealing his identity as the last surviving member of a family whom Sundaravelu's father had killed 35 years ago to encroach their land to build the palace Sundaravelu now lives in, revealing that he diliberately joined Sundaravelu as an adult to manipulate his actions and engineer his fall from within his gang. Sundaravelu realises that he does not have any support and shoots himself dead to avoid arrest.

== Cast ==
- Rajinikanth as Kaalaiyan
- Rati Agnihotri as Kannamma
- Sumalatha as Soundaryam
- Jaishankar as Sundaravelu
- Suruli Rajan as Saamipillai
- Y. G. Mahendran as Kaalaiyan's first brother
- G. Srinivasan as Kannamma's father
- Shantharam as Sangili
- Rajappa as Kaalaiyan's second brother
- Master Ramu as Kaalaiyan's third brother
- S. A. Ashokan (Guest appearance)
- Thengai Srinivasan (Guest appearance)

== Production ==
=== Development ===
AVM Productions took a break from producing films after few of their films failed at box-office. Its founder A. V. Meiyappan wanted S. P. Muthuraman to direct a film for AVM featuring Rajinikanth and Kamal Haasan, and Muthuraman agreed. However, a month later, Meiyappan died and Muthuraman became upset at not fulfilling his wish. Soon after, Meiyappan's son M. Saravanan reminded Muthuraman about his father's wish and said he, along with his brothers, would produce the prospective film, reinvigorating Muthuraman. Rajinikanth, who had a long-time desire to appear in an AVM film, readily agreed when approached by Muthuraman. However, Haasan was reluctant as he and Rajinikanth did not intend to act together again; Haasan told Muthuraman to make a separate film for each actor. Saravanan decided that work on the Rajinikanth film begin first.

Panchu Arunachalam developed the script for the film, which was titled Murattu Kaalai. It marked the fourth collaboration between Muthuraman and Rajinikanth, and both men's first with AVM. The film also marked the comeback of AVM to Tamil films after a long sabbatical. It was co-produced by Saravanan's brothers M. Kumaran and M. Balasubramaniam, photographed by Babu and edited by R. Vittal.

=== Casting and filming ===
Murattu Kaalai was the first film where Jaishankar, who was generally known for his heroic roles, portrayed a negative character. According to Muthuraman, the producers were initially hesitant to approach him, given his image, but Jaishankar agreed without any reservations. Rajinikanth wanted Jaishankar to get equal prominence in all the film's promotional material, and it happened that way. Y. G. Mahendran, Rasappa, Ramu and Arjunan were chosen to portray Rajinikanth's younger brothers. Rajinikanth wore a wig designed by B. Natesan throughout the shoot to portray his character. The makers chose to shoot the film in Pollachi as it had all that the script required: fields, forests, hills and rivers. The scene involving Rekla race was shot by tying the camera to the bottom of rekla cart.

The introductory jallikattu sequence and succeeding song "Pothuvaaga En Manasu Thangam" were shot at Paganeri, a village near Karaikudi while the close-up shots of Rajinikanth fighting with the bull in the field were shot at the AVM school playground in Chennai. When Muthuraman and Babu were scouting for locations which conduct jallikattu, they found a village who said this event will happen on villages like Paganeri and Palayapatti. Congress Leader Udayappa's family who lived in Paganeri helped the crew with resources and arranged the event. Around 400 bulls were bought from Madurai and Ramanathapuram for this scene. Since Muthuraman demanded a single horned bull with a particular colour also with that broken horn, the film's production manager had to scout every cattle markets for similar bulls but could not get such. After that they bought a bull and went to veterinary doctor who was forced to cut off the single horn from the bull and the crew waited for the wound to heal before shooting the scene. This scene took three days to be shot and it lasts around 1000 feet and it took 12 rolls to complete the scene.

The fight sequence at the top of a train was choreographed by Judo. K. K. Rathnam, was shot at Tenkasi Railway Station and took three days to film. According to Saravanan, the train fight scene was inspired by a Chinese film which was given by sons of Nalli Kuppuswami Chetti. Since train used to travel and arrive on that station only on morning and evening within four hours, the makers decided to shoot the scene on afternoon by hiring a train on rent. While filming the scene, the film's cinematographer Babu and his assistants placed the camera in front of the train engine, on the side of the garage, and under the train with the help of vacuum base.

The scene where Sumalatha dies was shot at Top hills in Pollachi while another fight scene was shot at a mango grove which is located 22 kilometrees away from Pollachi. The climax initially had the antagonist beaten and dragged by the police, but Rajinikanth could not bear to see Jaishankar in such a position; it was changed to have the character commit suicide to avoid arrest.

== Soundtrack ==
The music was composed by Ilaiyaraaja and the lyrics were written by Panchu Arunachalam. The song "Entha Poovilum" is based on Antonio Ruiz-Pipó's Cancion y Danza. For the song "Podhuvaga En Manasu", S. P. Muthuraman wanted an alternative tune for it. Ilaiyaraaja offered the tune of "Yeh Aatha" but Muthuraman preferred the earlier tune. "Yeh Aatha" was subsequently used in Payanangal Mudivathillai. "Pothuvaaga En Manasu Thangam" became immensely popular among fans of Rajinikanth, and featured prominently in the 1996 Tamil Nadu Legislative Assembly election.

Track listing
No.	Title	Singer(s)	Length
1.	"Entha Poovilum"	S. Janaki
2.	"Puthu Vannangal"	S. Janaki
3.	"Pothuvaaga En Manasu Thangam"	Malaysia Vasudevan
4.	"Maame Machchan"	S. P. Sailaja
5.	"Kodanu Kodi Konda Selvanai Padunga"	Malaysia Vasudevan, P. Susheela

== Release and reception ==
Murattu Kaalai was released on 20 December 1980. The review board of the magazine Ananda Vikatan gave the film a B rating (equal to 40 or 45 marks out of 100), calling it a mass commercial entertainer. The Indian Express noted "[..] there is nothing small in this movie. Nothing is compromised. All efforts are made to bring maximum entertainment to the audience. The lapse, if at all, is in the story" while felt the screenwriter slumbered in showing the atrocities of antagonist to show the "heroic exploits" of the lead protagonist. The film was a major commercial success, running for over 175 days in 4 theatres.

== Legacy ==
Murattu Kaalai popularised the trend of introduction songs which went on to become a trademark in Rajinikanth's films. The film also confirmed Rajinikanth's status as a superstar. As film historian G. Dhananjayan noted, "With [Murattu Kaalai], Rajinikanth went from being an acting hero to an action hero. He became a larger-than-life hero and superstar after this film." The train fight and jallikattu scenes remain landmark fight sequences in Tamil cinema. N. S. Ramnath wrote in Forbes India that though Tamil cinema became more experimental in the 1970s, Murattu Kaalai's success "put a stop to experimentation in films, and pushed everyone on to the masala bandwagon". "Seeviduven" (transl. I will decapitate you) became one of the popular catchphrases from the film.

Murattu Kaalai was remade again in Tamil under the same title by K. Selva Bharathy. The remake featured a remix of "Pothuvaaga En Manasu Thangam". It was released in 2012, and failed to repeat the success of the original. R. S. Prakash of Bangalore Mirror compared Veeram (2014) to Murattu Kaalai because of how it depicted the male lead's relationship with his four younger brothers.

== In popular culture ==
The dialogue "Seeviduven" became so popular and Rajinikanth also went on to utter the same dialogue in some of his films like Mappillai. In Muthu (1995), the title character (Rajinikanth) is seen performing "Podhuvaga En Manasu" on stage. In Subramaniapuram (2008), Azhagar (Jai) and Paraman (Sasikumar) are seen watching Murattu Kaalai at a theatre. In Enthiran (2010), Pachaimuthu (Kalabhavan Mani) utters the dialogue "Seeviduven" while threatening Vaseegaran (Rajinikanth). The 2017 film Podhuvaga Emmanasu Thangam was named after the song from Murattu Kaalai.

== Bibliography ==
- Rajadhyaksha, Ashish; Willemen, Paul (1998) [1994]. Encyclopaedia of Indian Cinema. British Film Institute and Oxford University Press. ISBN 0-19-563579-5.
- Ramachandran, Naman (2014) [2012]. Rajinikanth: The Definitive Biography. New Delhi: Penguin Books. ISBN 978-0-14-342111-5.
- Saravanan, M. (2013) [2005]. AVM 60 Cinema (in Tamil) (3rd ed.). Rajarajan Pathippagam. OCLC 1158347612.
- Muthuraman, S. P. (2017) [2005]. AVM Thandha SPM (in Tamil) (3rd ed.). Vikatan. OCLC 607342391.
