= Karuppu Roja =

- Title card
- Directed by: J. Paneer
- Written by: Aabavanan
- Produced by: A. Karunamoorthy; Indhumathy
- Starring: Ramki; Amar Siddique; Yosika; Vineetha
- Cinematography: Selvakumar
- Edited by: R.T Annadurai
- Music by: M. S. V. Raja
- Production company: Ayngaran International
- Release date: 13 December 1996
- Country: India
- Language: Tamil

Karuppu Roja (transl. Black Rose) is a 1996 Indian Tamil-language dark fantasy film directed by Paneer, written by Aabavanan and produced by Ayngaran International. The film stars Ramki, Amar Siddique, Yosika, Vineetha amongst others. The project became the first DTS film in Indian cinema, and had music composed by M. S. V. Raja, his first music composing venture.

== Plot ==
Vinodh and Thulasi meet in college and fall in love and he manipulates her into marrying him. He then takes away her firstborn to kill him as an offering to please Satan in order to cure his mentally ill mother who has been insane since the death of her husband. But Aravindh, a kind exorcist who exorcises the ghosts in the Hindus by chanting Manthras, saves the child by praying to Shiva, and Thulasi is also rescued by him finally. Vinodh dies at the former's hands for spreading Satanism.

== Cast ==
- Ramki as Aravindh
- Amar Siddique as Vinod (voice dubbed by Vikram)
- Yosika as Thulasi
- Vineetha as Meena
- Dubbing Janaki as Thulasi's mother
- S.R. Veeraraghavan as Thulasi's father
- Charle
- Srikanth
- Karikalan
- Kavithashree
- Kokila Gobinathan
- Sangeetha Balan

== Production ==
Karuppu Roja was written by Aabavanan. It was produced jointly by writer Indhumathi and by Karunamoorthy, who made his debut as a producer in the Tamil film industry with his studio Ayngaran International. The film was heavily publicised before releases, with the producers targeting magazines in particular to rave about the new sound system that the venture was introducing. Filming took place exclusively at the Andhra University and Bheemunipatnam regions in Vishakhapatnam, Andhra Pradesh with some sporadic schedules taking place in and around Chennai.

== Soundtrack ==
The soundtrack was composed by M. S. V. Raja, with lyrics by Aabavanan.

Track listing
No.	Title	Singer(s)	Length
1.	"Mella Chirithal"	Suresh Peters	5:03
2.	"Mangala Roopini"	K. S. Chithra	1:25
3.	"Siraiyil"	K. S. Chithra	2:13
4.	"Karaiyil Oru"	S. P. Balasubrahmanyam	5:06
5.	"Dealiya Poo"	Chandrabose	4:54
6.	"Thaayin Madiyil"	P. Jayachandran	1:24
7.	"Thottu Vidava Naan"	S. P. Balasubrahmanyam, Swarnalatha	5:01
8.	"Siraiyil" (repeat)	K. S. Chithra	1:54
9.	"Thaayin Madiyil" (repeat)	Jayachandran	1:47
10.	"Thaayin Madiyal" (instrumental)	—	1:26
Total length:			30:13

== Reception ==
Taramani of Kalki wrote that the uncharismatic lead pair, harsh music, logicless plot, dramatic dialogues are the troubles; however the only consolation is the screenplay, which is nothing short of horror while also panning the DTS sound system for being too loud and there is nothing appreciative about this film which has superstitions. Taramani concluded since the film had disgusting elements like spirits, black magic and sacrifice, they felt like bathing with dettol after coming out from the theatre. D. S. Ramanujam of The Hindu wrote " Iyngaran International's Karuppu Roja takes the viewer on a different plane of entertainment. Added to these is the technical expertise of Aabavanan (story, screenplay, lyrics and music) and his team, putting the computer graphics to good effect, the DTS sound system in Abirami cinema completing the picture." H. Sridhar won the Tamil Nadu State Film Award for Best Audiographer, while D. Rajan won the Tamil Nadu State Film Award for Best Art Director.
