= Murattu Kaalai (2012 film) =

2012 Indian film by K. Selva Bharathy

- Movie poster
- Directed by: K. Selva Bharathy
- Written by: K. Selva Bharathy
- Story by: Panchu Arunachalam
- Produced by: Amirtham Gunanidhi
- Starring: Sundar C Sneha; Sindhu Tolani; Suman; Vivek
- Cinematography: Santonio Terzio
- Edited by: Praveen K. L. Srikanth N. B.
- Music by: Srikanth Deva
- Production company: Surya Productions
- Distributed by: Ayngaran International
- Release date: 15 June 2012
- Country: India
- Language: Tamil

Murattu Kaalai (transl. Raging Bull) is a 2012 Tamil-language action film written and directed by K. Selva Bharathy and produced by Amirtham Gunanidhi. A remake of the 1980 film of same name, it stars Sundar C, Sneha and Sindhu Tolani, while Suman and Vivek play supporting roles. The music was composed by Srikanth Deva. The film, which had been under production since 2008, released on 15 June 2012 to negative reviews and failed to repeat the success of the original.

== Plot ==
Kaalaiyan is a simple person and the best jallikattu (bullfight) player in his village. His world revolves around his four younger brothers. Varadharajan, a zamindar from the neighbouring village who lives an extravagant lifestyle. His close aide is the transgender Saroja. Varadharajan's sister Priya falls for Kaalaiyan when he wins a Jallikattu. In the meantime, Bhuvana is running from Varadharajan as he falls for her charm and tries to molest her. She takes refuge in Kaalaiyan's house. However, Varadharajan decides to marry Priya to Kaalaiyan, with an eye on his land. On the day of the marriage, when Kaalaiyan learns that the bride wants to split the bond between the brothers, he calls off the marriage. Kaalaiyan takes a liking for Bhuvana and the inevitable happens – romance blossoms. What follows is predictable, but there comes a surprise in the form of Saroja in the climax.

== Cast ==
- Sundar C as Kaalaiyan
- Sneha as Bhuvana
- Sindhu Tolani as Priya
- Suman as Varadharajan
- Vivek as Saroja / Saami
- Meenal as Saroja's maid
- Lollu Sabha Jeeva as Kaalaiyan's brother
- Periya Karuppu Thevar as Saroja's grandfather
- Stunt Silva as Suruli
- Cell Murugan as Veterinarian
- Devan
- Thyagu
- Alex
- King Kong as Kaalaiyan's uncle
- Vichu Vishwanath
- Chutti Aravind
- Ambani Shankar
- Kadhal Arun Kumar

== Production ==
In September 2008, it was revealed that Tamil Nadu Chief Minister M. Karunanidhi's grandson Gunanidhi was set to produce a remake of AVM Productions's 1980 film, Murattu Kaalai. Sundar C was roped in to play the lead role, while Suman would play the villain role done by Jaishankar, and Suruli Rajan's comedy will be taken over by Vivek, in the venture to be directed by Selva Bharathy. The team initially hoped to begin production in December 2008 and released the film on 14 April 2009. Sneha was soon after assigned to play the lead female role, while Samiksha was also selected to play another leading role. However, during the first schedule in Pollachi, Samiksha was replaced by Sindhu Tolani for unknown reasons and the team subsequently completed two full schedules by January 2009. However Ayngaran International's financial crisis meant that Murattu Kaalai along with their other productions became stuck. The film re-emerged when Chief Minister of Tamil Nadu, M. Karunanidhi launched the audio of the film on 18 September 2010, which was received by actor Vikram and the film was expected to be released by 12 November 2010, but eventually did not.

The film subsequently remained completed by unreleased due to Ayngaran International's financial problems which had also stopped the release of other films such as Arjunan Kadhali and Kalavadiya Pozhudugal. The film finally was promoted and released by the production house on 15 June 2012.

== Soundtrack ==
Murattu Kaalai

Soundtrack album by Srikanth Deva
- Released: 18 September 2010
- Recorded: 2010
- Genre: Soundtrack
- Length: 24:55
- Label: Ayngaran
- Producer: Srikanth Deva

Srikanth Deva chronology
Marupadiyum Oru Kadhal (2012)	Murattu Kaalai (2010)	Chandhamama (2013)

Music was scored by Srikanth Deva and released on Ayngaran. "Podhuvaga En Manasu Thangam" from Murattu Kaalai (1980) was reused and remixed from the 1980 film.

All lyrics are written by K. Selva Bharathy.

Track-List
No.	Title	Artist(s)	Length
1.	"Podhuvaaga En Manasu Thangam"	Naveen	5:11
2.	"Punnagai Enna Vilai"	Hariharan, Shraviya	5:10
3.	"Sundara Purusha"	Simbhu, Anuradha Sriram	5:03
4.	"Dhavani"	Surmukhi Raman	5:00
5.	"Bhonda Koli"	Malathi	4:31
Total length:			24:55

== Critical reception ==
The film received mixed to negative reviews. The Times of India rated the film 3/5 stating that, "Still, the good news here is that, surprisingly, 'Murattu Kaalai' is not a disaster and works to an extent. But the bad news is that this is an entirely pointless remake with hardly anything new to offer". Anupama Subramanian of Deccan Chronicle rated the film 2.5/5 praising Vivek's and Sundar.C's performances and stated that the movie is "Watchable Once".

Rohit Ramachandran of Nowrunning.com rated it 1/5 calling the film "sickening." Sify rated the movie as "Below Average" praising Santonio Terzio's work. Vivek Ramz of in.com rated Murattu Kaalai 2/5 calling it "a poor remake" and added that it's an example of how not to remake an old blockbuster.
