= Taraka Ramudu =

- Theatrical release poster
- Directed by: R. V. Udayakumar
- Written by: M. V. S. Haranadha Rao (dialogues)
- Screenplay by: R. V. Udayakumar
- Story by: Sujatha Udhayakumar
- Produced by: M. Sudhakar; K. Shobanbabu
- Starring: Srikanth; Soundarya
- Cinematography: M. Sudhakar
- Edited by: Anil Malnad
- Music by: Koti
- Production company: Maha Ganapathi Films
- Release date: 29 August 1997
- Country: India
- Language: Telugu

Taraka Ramudu is a 1997 Indian Telugu-language romantic drama film directed by R. V. Udayakumar, starring Srikanth and Soundarya. The film was partially reshot and released in Tamil as Velli Nilave (transl. Oh silver moon; 1998) with Manivannan and Senthil replacing Kota Srinivasa Rao and Babu Mohan, respectively. Selva dubbed for Srikanth's character in the Tamil version.

== Cast ==
- Srikanth as Ramudu
- Soundarya as Taraka
- Srikanya as Ramudu's cousin
- Ranganath as Gajapati
- Anandaraj as Gajapati's brother-in-law
- Kota Srinivasa Rao as Guru gaaru and his son (dual role)
  - Manivannan as Suriya Pandi (Tamil version)
- Babu Mohan
  - Senthil as Chandra Pandi (Tamil version)
- Karikalan
- Chelladurai as Manual Officer
- Kovai Senthil as Mandal Officer
- Madhusudhan Rao as Rowdy (uncredited)
- Jayalalitha

== Soundtrack ==
The soundtrack was composed by Koti and all lyrics were written by Sirivennela Seetharama Sastry.

Track listing
No.	Title	Singer(s)	Length
1.	"Dandalandi Kotha"	Krishnam Raju, K. S. Chithra	4:55
2.	"Kopam Vasthe"	S. P. Balasubrahmanyam, K. S. Chithra	4:28
3.	"Ivali Ivvalyna"	S. P. Balasubrahmanyam, K. S. Chithra	5:01
4.	"Chettumedhi Usiri"	S. P. Balasubrahmanyam	1:27
5.	"Hai Hai Venelamma"	S. P. Balasubrahmanyam	5:07
6.	"Sadicheyakamma"	S. P. Balasubrahmanyam	2:03
7.	"Ramudu Manchi"	S. P. Balasubrahmanyam	5:29
Total length:			28:33

== Reception ==
Reviewing the Tamil version, D. S. Ramanujam of The Hindu wrote, "Sujatha Udayakumar's old fashioned story has nothing much to enthuse about and the director's screenplay, dialogue (he has also penned the lyrics) and handling give credibility to the main characters, despite the narrative drawbacks".
