= Rajakumaran (film) =

- Theatrical release poster
- Directed by: R. V. Udayakumar
- Written by: Gokula Krishnan (dialogues)
- Screenplay by: R. V. Udayakumar
- Story by: Sujatha Udhayakumar
- Produced by: Prabhu
- Starring: Prabhu; Meena; Nadhiya
- Cinematography: Abdul Rahman
- Edited by: B. S. Nagaraj; N. Kapilan
- Music by: Ilaiyaraaja
- Production company: Sivaji Productions
- Release date: 14 January 1994
- Running time: 145 minutes
- Country: India
- Language: Tamil

Rajakumaran (transl. Prince) is a 1994 Indian Tamil-language action drama film directed by R. V. Udayakumar. The film stars Prabhu, Meena and Nadhiya. It was released on 14 January 1994, during Pongal. The film was Prabhu's 100th film and was produced by Sivaji Productions.

== Plot ==
The kindhearted Rajakumaran is the son of the village chief in Sundharapuri. Selvi and Vaidehi are in love with their cousin Rajakumaran but he chooses Vaidehi and Selvi decides to sacrifice her love. During a jallikattu spectacle in Sundharapuri, Yuvaraj, who is from the neighbouring village Palipattu, insults the villagers of Sundharapuri for not being able to tame his bull. A brave Rajakumaran then tames his bull and he humiliates him back. Selvi's father Selvaraj refuses to give his property to the village people as promised. To give away the property, his only request is that Rajakumaran marry his daughter Selvi. Selvi convinces Rajakumaran to lie for the good of all, so he lies to her father and acquires the property. Vaidehi, who learns about it, is heartbroken and decides to kill herself by jumping into a well. Later, Vaidehi is found dead when Rajakumaran finally reveals his lie.

One day, some goons decide to put a bomb in Sundharapuri but Rajakumaran beats up the goon and saves the village. The villagers think that the culprit was Selvi's brother Thangaraj because he wanted to take revenge on Rajakumaran for his lie. An angry Thangaraj then insults Rajakumaran's father in a wedding function and Rajakumaran's father dies of a heart attack due to the humiliation. Yuvaraj asks the permission of Selvaraj and Thangaraj to marry Selvi, and they accept. On the day of the marriage, the villagers are against the marriage and beg Rajakumaran to save Selvi from the heartless Yuvaraj. A man then says that a deaf-mute girl was the witness of Vaidehi's murder by Yuvaraj. Yuvaraj cancels the marriage and decides to humiliate Selvi in his village. Rajakumaran saves her and decides to marry her.

== Cast ==
- Prabhu as Rajakumaran
- Meena as Selvi
- Nadhiya as Vaidehi
- Nassar as Yuvaraj
- Vijayakumar as Rajamanikkam Gounder
- Sujatha as Sivagami
- Goundamani as Maarusamy
- Senthil as Ponnusamy
- Vadivelu as 'Vicharuva' Veerasamy
- Captain Raju as Selvaraj
- Kavitha as Bhagyam
- Rajmadhan as Dhanaraj
- Sathyapriya as Sundari
- Thyagu as Thangaraj
- Kaka Radhakrishnan
- Oru Viral Krishna Rao
- Periya Karuppu Thevar
- Kovai Senthil
- Pasi Narayanan
- Chelladurai
- R. V. Udayakumar in a cameo appearance
- Sheela Kaur as young Vaidehi

== Production ==
Rajakumaran is the 100th film of Prabhu as an actor. Since it is the 100th film of Prabhu, Sivaji Productions decided to produce this film by themselves and chose R. V. Udayakumar to direct the film. Nadhiya who took a break from films after marriage made her acting comeback with this film.

== Soundtrack ==
The soundtrack was composed by Ilaiyaraaja, with the lyrics written by the director Udayakumar. The song "Chinna Chinna Sol Eduthu" is set in Pahadi raga.

Song	Singer(s)	Duration
"Aadi Varattum"	S. P. Balasubrahmanyam, K. S. Chithra	5:16
"Chinna Chinna Sol Eduthu"	K. J. Yesudas, S. Janaki	5:08
"Ennavendru Solvathamma"	S. P. Balasubrahmanyam	5:04
"Kaatule Kambakaatule"	S. P. Balasubrahmanyam, S. Janaki	5:01
"Pottu Vachathu Yaaru"	S. P. Balasubrahmanyam	4:01
"Rajakumara Rajakumara"	Mano, Sunandha	4:25
"Sithagathi Pookale"	S. P. Balasubrahmanyam, K. S. Chithra	4:41

== Release and reception ==
Rajakumaran was released on 14 January 1994 coinciding with Pongal. The film received negative reviews and became a box-office bomb. The Indian Express wrote, "Udayakumar seems to have exhausted his stock of ideas [...] Rajakumaran is nothing but a rehash of his earlier film Ejaman". R. P. R. of Kalki felt this is Prabhu's 100th test match, but no one seems to have acted with that responsibility.
