= Mayabazar (2008 film) =

- Directed by: Thomas Sebastian
- Screenplay by: T. A. Razzaq
- Story by: Govind Ramdas
- Produced by: Ayngaran International; Akhil films
- Starring: Mammootty; Sheela Kaur; Kalabhavan Mani; Suraj Venjaramoodu; Lalu Alex
- Cinematography: Manoj Pillai
- Edited by: Bijith Bala
- Music by: Original Songs: Rahul Raj; Background Score: Mohan Sithara
- Release date: 4 October 2008
- Country: India
- Language: Malayalam

Mayabazar is a 2008 Indian Malayalam-language action comedy film directed by Thomas Sebastian with Mammootty in the Double role. In the film, Rameshan, a man who is the leading vendor of a salvaged car bazaar helps patients at a local hospital with the money he earns. One day, he stumbles upon the dead body of his lookalike and his life takes a turn.

The film received mixed reviews.

== Plot ==
Maya Bazaar is in a village called Mayannoor where people buy salvaged vehicles for their parts. Rameshan is a leading man of the bazaar. With the money he earns, he feeds patients at the local hospital. A young woman who lives in Maya Bazaar called Maya loves Rameshan, but Rameshan does not have any feelings for her. Rameshan has a rival gang led by Bhadran and Bhadran wants to marry Maya.

One day Rameshan happens to see the body of a person killed in a road accident. The person looks exactly like him, and his name is Lakshmi Narayanan. The rest of the movie is about the mystery associated with the dead man.

== Cast ==
- Mammootty in a dual role as:
  - Rameshan
  - Lakshmi Narayanan
- Sheela Kaur as Maya, Rameshan's Love Interest (Voice-over by Sreeja Ravi)
- Tisca Chopra as Neena Kurian, Lakshmi Narayan ex-lover and Andrews's Wife
- Kalabhavan Mani as Bhadran, Mayabazar Leader
- Saikumar as Simon Joseph, Lakshmi Narayan's Friend
- Lalu Alex as Dr.Koshy
- Suraj Venjaramoodu as Pachu, Member of Mayabazar and Car Mechanican
- Salim Kumar as Govindan Achari
- Rajan P. Dev as Aakri Divakaran, Rameshan's Father
- Janardhanan as Kurian, Neena's Father
- Bijukuttan as Girijan
- Vincent Asokan as Andrews, The Main Antagonist
- T. G. Ravi as Jose, A Tea Shop Owner
- Mala Aravindan as Kumarankutty Aasan
- Augustine as SI Mathews George
- Anoop Chandran as Vijayan
- Anil Murali as Kallavandi Vikraman
- Sabitha Anand as Ponnutty, Rameshan's Daughter and Former Lakshmi Narayan's Daughter
- Ambika Mohan as Annakutty Kurian, Neena's Mother
- Vijay Kumar as Stephen, Hospital Attender
- Yamini Sharma as an item dancer in the song "Jiliu Jillu Nee"

== Soundtrack ==
- "Mizhiyil Mizhiyil" - Sujatha Mohan, Sreenivas, Rahul Raj
- "Jiliu Jillu Nee" - Vineeth Sreenivasan, Cicily, Sayanora Philip
- "Mizhiyil Mizhiyil" (F) - Sujatha Mohan

== Release ==
The film was released on 4 October 2008 and became a below average grosser. Later the film was dubbed in Telugu under the title Nenunnanu.
