= Mere Sapno Ki Rani (film) =

- Directed by: K. Raghavendra Rao
- Written by: Javed Siddiqui (dialogues)
- Story by: Satyanand
- Based on: Pelli Sandadi by K. Raghavendra Rao
- Produced by: C. Ashwini Dutt
- Starring: Sanjay Kapoor; Urmila Matondkar; Madhoo
- Cinematography: V. Jayaram
- Edited by: Marthand K. Venkatesh
- Music by: Songs: Anand–Milind; Score: M. M. Srilekha
- Production company: Sri Raghavendra Movie Corporation
- Release date: 15 August 1997
- Running time: 157 minutes
- Country: India
- Language: Hindi

Mere Sapno Ki Rani (transl. The queen of my dreams) is a 1997 Indian Hindi-language film directed by K. Raghavendra Rao and produced by Allu Aravind and C. Ashwini Dutt. It stars Sanjay Kapoor, Urmila Matondkar, and Madhoo. The film was a remake of the 1996 Telugu film Pelli Sandadi.

== Cast ==
- Sanjay Kapoor as Vijay Kumar
- Urmila Matondkar as Sapna Nehle
- Madhoo as Vandana Nehle
- Kulbhushan Kharbanda as Mr. Kumar
- Satish Kaushik as Ram Nehle
- Anupam Kher as Lakhan Nehle
- Shakti Kapoor as Mamaji
- Laxmikant Berde as Arun
- Dinesh Hingoo as Pandit
- Satyendra Kapoor as Rajnath Nehle
- Dina Pathak as Rajnath's mom
- Asrani as Gate-crasher
- Rakesh Bedi as Gate-crasher

== Music ==
Lyrics by Dev Kohli. Two songs ("Ye Pyaar Ye Pyaar" and "Bagiya Ke Amrud") were reused from the original. The song "Aaja Mere Baahon" is based on the Telugu song "Bhimavaram Bulloda" from the Telugu film Gharana Bullodu.

#	Title	Singer(s)
1	"Choli Ke Peeche"	Vinod Rathod, Abhijeet, Jolly Mukherji
2	" Payal Kare Ye Cham Cham"	Udit Narayan, Alka Yagnik
3	"Chupke Chupke"	Alka Yagnik, Sadhana Sargam
4	"Aaja Meri Baahon Mein"	Udit Narayan, Alka Yagnik
5	"Chhama Chaka"	Udit Narayan, Sadhana Sargam
6	"Swapna Sundari"	Udit Narayan, Alka Yagnik
7	"Phir Se Dhol"	Vinod Rathod, Udit Narayan, Alka Yagnik
8	"Sabji Kat Kat Ke"	Vinod Rathod, Abhijeet, Jolly Mukherji
9	"Bagiya Ke Amrud"	Alka Yagnik
10	"Yeh Pyaar Yeh Pyaar"	Udit Narayan, Alka Yagnik, Bela Sulakhe
