= Puthiya Vaanam =

1988 film by R. V. Udayakumar

- Theatrical release poster
- Directed by: R. V. Udayakumar
- Screenplay by: R. M. Veerappan; R. V. Udayakumar (dialogues)
- Story by: Anil Sharma
- Produced by: G. Thyagarajan; V. Thamilazhagan
- Starring: Sivaji Ganesan; Sathyaraj; Rupini; Gautami
- Cinematography: Ravi Yadav
- Edited by: K. R. Krishnan
- Music by: Hamsalekha
- Production company: Sathya Movies
- Release date: 10 December 1988
- Running time: 150 minutes
- Country: India
- Language: Tamil

Puthiya Vaanam (transl. New Sky) is a 1988 Indian Tamil-language action drama film directed by R. V. Udayakumar. The film stars Sivaji Ganesan, Sathyaraj, Rupini, and Gautami. A remake of the 1987 Hindi film Hukumat, it was released on 10 December 1988.

== Plot ==
In the past, the honest military officer Jeevadurai was killed by Govindan. Thereafter, Rajaratnam, Jeevadurai's son, was brought up by D.I.G. Pandidurai. A few years later, Rajaratnam marries Devaki and they then have a son. Like his father, Rajaratnam becomes a police officer. In Shanthi Nagar, Govindan, who is now known as Kocha, controls the city and the people are afraid of him and his henchmen. His adopted father Pandidurai transfers Rajaratnam to Shanthi Nagar.

== Cast ==
- Sivaji Ganesan as D.I.G. Pandidurai
- Sathyaraj as M. G. Rajaratnam (MGR)
- Rupini as Devaki
- Gautami as Mary
- Vijayakumar as Kocha / Govindan
- Janagaraj as Pattabi
- Rajesh Kumar as Joni, Kocha's son
- Nassar
- Charle
- LIC Narasimhan as Samuel
- K. Natraj
- Ponnambalam
- Oru Viral Krishna Rao
- Idichapuli Selvaraj
- Ennatha Kannaiya
- Sethu Vinayagam
- Gundu Kalyanam
- Baby Sujitha
- Kuyili
- Disco Shanti
- Anuja
- Jai Ganesh as Jeevadurai (guest appearance)

== Production ==
Puthiya Vaanam, a remake of the 1987 Hindi film Hukumat, is the 275th film of Ganesan. Its title is derived from a song from Anbe Vaa (1966). The name of Sathyaraj's character, M. G. Rajaratnam or MGR, is an allusion to that film's lead actor M. G. Ramachandran.

== Soundtrack ==
The soundtrack was composed by Hamsalekha.

Song	Singer(s)	Lyrics	Duration
'Manidha Innum'	S. P. Balasubrahmanyam	Ilandevan	2:49
'Mynaa Mynaa'	S. P. Balasubrahmanyam, S. P. Sailaja, Sunanda	Muthulingam	4:39
'Oore Kedithavane'	S. P. Balasubrahmanyam, S. P. Sailaja	Gangai Amaran	4:08
'Oru Paadal Solgiren'	S. P. Balasubrahmanyam, Malaysia Vasudevan	R. V. Udayakumar	4:36
'Raakuyile'	S. P. Balasubrahmanyam, K. S. Chithra	R. V. Udayakumar	4:58

== Reception ==
The Indian Express wrote, "Under enterprising young filmmaker Udayakumar's direction, debutant cameraman Ravi Yadav imparts a glow and sheen to the frames [..]". P. S. S. of Kalki praised the acting of Ganesan, Sathyaraj, Rupini, the humour of Janagaraj and Charle, Hamsalekha's music and cinematography but felt Gauthami was underutilized and concluded that all the commercial ingredients have been made in equal proportions.
