= Urudhi Mozhi =

- Poster
- Directed by: R. V. Udayakumar
- Written by: R. V. Udayakumar
- Produced by: Ravi Yadav
- Starring: Prabhu; Shanthini; Sivakumar; Geetha; Bharathi
- Cinematography: R. Ganesh
- Edited by: G. R. Anilmalnad
- Music by: Ilaiyaraaja
- Production company: Yaathavaalayaa
- Release date: 1 December 1990
- Country: India
- Language: Tamil

Urudhi Mozhi (transl. Pledge) is a 1990 Indian Tamil-language action adventure film, directed by R. V. Udayakumar and produced by Ravi Yadav. The film stars Prabhu, Shanthini, Geetha, Sivakumar and Bharathi. It was released on 1 December 1990, and became Udayakumar's third consecutive box office success.

== Cast ==
- Prabhu as Arun
- Sarath Kumar as Legal Loganathan
- Sivakumar as Dr. Chandrasekar
- Shanthini as Suganthi
- Geetha as Jaya Chandrasekar ( Guest Appearance)
- Jai Ganesh
- Bharathi as Abhirami
- Janagaraj as Jagan
- Sarathkumar as Legal
- Anandaraj
- Sharat Saxena
- Pandu as Pattu

== Production ==
The film was produced by cinematographer Ravi Yadav. Some of the scenes were shot at Thekkady.

== Soundtrack ==
The music was composed by Ilaiyaraaja, with lyrics by R. V. Udayakumar.

Song	Singers	Length
"Neruppu Neruppu"	K. S. Chithra, S. P. Balasubrahmanyam	04:37
"Adhi Kaalai Nilave"	P. Jayachandran, S. Janaki	04:31
"Dhinakku Dhinakku" (Happy)	S. Janaki, S. P. Sailaja	03:15
"Maarelo Mari"	Chorus	02:17
"Anbu Kathai"	S. P. Balasubrahmanyam	04:36
"Takkara Achadi"	S. P. Balasubrahmanyam	04:50
"Dhinakku Dhinakku" (Pathos)	Ilaiyaraaja, S. Janaki, S. P. Sailaja	02:29

== Reception ==
The Indian Express wrote, "The choice of locales, the stunts enacted and the technical finesse of the film, make it an effective action adventure".
