= R. V. Udayakumar =

Indian film director

- Born: Mettupalayam, Coimbatore, Tamil Nadu, India
- Occupations: Director, actor, lyricist
- Years active: 1988–1996; 2005; 2012–present
- Spouse: Sujatha
- Children: 1

R. V. Udayakumar is an Indian film director, lyricist and actor who worked predominantly in the Tamil film industry throughout the 1990s, making films including Kizhakku Vaasal (1990), Chinna Gounder (1992), Yajaman and Ponnumani (both 1993). He has also directed two Telugu films.

== Early life ==
Udayakumar was born to an agricultural family in a village called Mollepalayam near Mettupalayam. His father is Venkatasamy and mother is Kannammal. He graduated with P. U. C from govt Arts and science College and studied BSc in Coimbatore. He joined the Madras Film Institute to pursue a diploma in direction. During the course, Udayakumar directed various short films.

== Career ==
He worked as an associate director for films like Neram Vandhachu, Janani and Oomai Vizhigal. He made his directorial debut with Urimai Geetham starring Prabhu and Karthik. The film became successful and RM Veerappan provided him an opportunity to direct his second film Puthiya Vaanam, remake of Hindi film Hukumat. The film starred Sivaji Ganesan and Sathyaraj. He then directed Uruthimozhi. His fourth film Kizhakku Vasal became successful at the box office, the shooting of this film was plagued with various problems. The set which was built for the film was burnt, M. S. Madhu, storywriter of this film suffered from fits after witnessing the fire. Actress Sulakshana was admitted to hospital due to nose bleeding. RV Udayakumar was hospitalised due to car accident and he went into coma for one month. After recovery, Udayakumar completed the climax of the film. His next venture Chinna Gounder featured Vijayakanth as a soft-spoken village chieftain which was radically different from larger than life action roles which he was used to play, it was another successful film for both actor and director. He then directed Singaravelan with Kamal Haasan which also became successful.

After the success of Chinna Gounder, Udayakumar was approached by various producers but he was in confusion in selecting hero for his next film and then he decided to have Rajinikanth as hero for his next film. Rajini agreed to act under the direction of Udayakumar and Udayakumar expressed his interest to make this film for AVM Productions. Initially different script was narrated but Udaykumar later opted to film other script as AVM Saravanan felt that it might go over budget. Meena was selected as heroine, Rajini was initially reluctant to have her as heroine as she appeared as child artist for his film Anbulla Rajinikanth and he felt that his fans might not accept this combination but eventually Rajini agreed to do so. The success of Ejamaan meant that Udayakumar began a film titled Jilla Collecter with Rajinikanth, but the film was later cancelled. He again directed Ponnumani with Karthik which also became successful venture.

He then directed Prabhu's 100th film Rajakumaran which became a flop but featured a successful soundtrack. His subsequent films Nandhavana Theru starring Karthik and Subash starring Arjun became failure and average at box office respectively. He made his debut in Telugu with Tarakaramudu starring Srikanth and Soundarya, became a flop and was dubbed in Tamil as Velli Malare. He then began an incomplete film titled Ulagai Vilai Pesava with Karthik and Malavika, before completing a project called Chinna Ramasamy Periya Ramasamy with himself and Jayaram in leading roles. In spite of the soundtrack being released, the film remains unreleased. He was announced to direct Telugu remake of Nandha with Kalyanram which failed to proceed after launch. He then made a comeback with Karka Kasadara introducing actor Vijay's cousin Vikranth in lead role. The film flopped at box office and Udayakumar opted against directing films and started portraying supporting roles as an actor.

== Personal life ==
Udayakumar is married to Sujatha who provided the story for many of his films.

== Filmography ==
=== As director ===
- Note: all films are in Tamil, unless otherwise noted.

Year	Film	Verdict
1988	Urimai Geetham	
1988	Puthiya Vaanam	
1990	Urudhi Mozhi	
1990	Kizhakku Vasal	Tamil Nadu State Film Award for Best Film (Third prize)
1992	Chinna Gounder	Tamil Nadu State Film Award for Best Film (Third prize)
1992	Singaravelan	
1993	Yajaman	
1993	Ponnumani	
1994	Rajakumaran	
1995	Nandhavana Theru	
1996	Subash	
1997	Taraka Ramudu	Telugu film
2000	Aaya	Telefilm made for DD Podhigai; also producer
2005	Karka Kasadara	
2011	Mr. Rascal	Telugu film; remake of Thiruttu Payale

=== As actor ===
- Chinna Gounder (1992)
- Ponnumani (1993)
- Ejamaan (1993)
- Rajakumaran (1994)
- Chinna Ramasamy Periya Ramasamy (2000) – Unreleased
- Iru Nadhigal (2008)
- Sooriya Nagaram (2012)
- Pasanga 2 (2015)
- Anjala (2016)
- Thodari (2016)
- Devi (2016 - Multilingual)
- Paambhu Sattai (2017)
- Kelambitangaya Kelambitangaya (2018)
- 100% Kadhal (2019)
- Ithu Kathaiyalla Nijam (2023)
- Karumegangal Kalaigindrana (2023)
- Ninaivellam Neeyada (2024)
- Garudan (2024)
- Rajaputhiran (2025)
- Desingu Raja 2 (2025)
- Red Label (2026)

=== As lyricist ===
Year	Film name	Song name	Music	Notes
1988	Urimai Geetham	all songs	Manoj-Gyan	
1990	Urudhi Mozhi	All songs	Ilaiyaraaja	
1990	Kizhakku Vasal	Paadi Parandha, Pachaimalai Poo, Vandhadhe, Thalukki	Ilaiyaraaja	
1992	Singaravelan	Innum Ennai	Ilaiyaraaja	
1992	Chinna Gounder	all songs	Ilaiyaraaja	
1993	Ponnumani	all songs	Ilaiyaraaja	
1993	Ejamaan	Yejaman Kaaladi, Nilave Mugam, Aalapol, Idiye Aanalum, Oru Naalum, Thookuchattiya, Urakka Kattura	Ilaiyaraaja	
1993	Dharmaseelan	Kinnaram	Ilaiyaraaja	
1994	Rajakumaran	all songs	Ilaiyaraaja	
1995	Nandhavana Theru	all songs	Ilaiyaraaja	
1995	Periya Kudumbam	Muchathu Maadapura, Thathi Thathi	Ilaiyaraaja	
1996	Subash	all songs	Vidyasagar	
1997	Dharma Chakkaram	all songs	Deva	
1998	Velai	Oivedu Nilave	Yuvan Shankar Raja	
1998	Guru Paarvai	Vekkali Amman	Deva	
2000	Kakkai Siraginilae	all songs	Ilaiyaraaja	
2002	Shree	"Kala Kalavena", "Vasantha Sena"	T. S. Muralidharan	
2003	Chokka Thangam	Enna Nenacha	Deva	
2005	Karka Kasadara	all songs	Prayog	
