= Ponnumani =

1993 film by R. V. Udayakumar

- Poster
- Directed by: R. V. Udayakumar
- Written by: Gokula Krishnan (dialogues)
- Screenplay by: R. V. Udayakumar
- Story by: Sujatha Udayakumar
- Produced by: J. B. Rajaravi; Jegadeesh
- Starring: Karthik; Soundarya; Sivakumar
- Cinematography: Abdul Rahman
- Edited by: B. S. Nagaraj
- Music by: Ilaiyaraaja
- Production company: Thaai Sakthi Productions
- Release date: 16 April 1993
- Running time: 149 minutes
- Country: India
- Language: Tamil

Ponnumani is a 1993 Indian Tamil-language drama film, directed by R. V. Udayakumar, starring Karthik, Soundarya (in her Tamil film debut) and Sivakumar. It was released on 16 April 1993. It won the Tamil Nadu State Film Award for Best Story.

== Plot ==
Ponnumani and Chinthamani are sweethearts who spend their childhood together in a village. Chinthamani goes off to pursue an education, but she and Ponnumani remain devoted to each other. Kathirvelu, who dotes on Ponnumani wants to see them happily married.

It is decided that they would marry once Chinthamani's exams are over. Ponnumani, who has been waiting all his life for this moment sets off eagerly to receive Chinthamani at the station. He is shocked to find her in a mentally unbalanced state.

Later on he learns that Chinthamani has been brutally molested by Uday Prakash and is pregnant, which results in Kathirvelu's death. Though overwhelmed with grief, he tries to arrange Chinthamani's marriage with the rapist. When the latter shows no remorse for his act, and tries to kill Chinthamani, Ponnumani kills him and is sentenced for 5 years imprisonment. He is reunited with childlike Chinthamani and her daughter.

== Cast ==
- Karthik as Ponnumani
- Soundarya as Chinthamani
- Sivakumar as Kathirvelu
- Goundamani as Nachi
- Senthil
- Vadivelu
- Manorama as Kathiravelu's mother
- Uday Prakash
- G. M. Sundar

== Production ==
Ponnumani is the Tamil debut for Soundarya. The film was entirely shot at Sethumadai near Pollachi.

== Music ==
The music was composed by Ilaiyaraaja. Lyrics were written by the director Udayakumar. The song "Adiye Vanjikodi" was composed by Ilaiyaraaja's son Karthik Raja. The song "Nenjukulle Innarunu" is set in Keeravani raga. According to Charulatha Mani, the song brought out "emotion of sadness in love very effectively". For the dubbed Telugu version Muddula Baava, all songs were written by Rajasri.

Tamil
No.	Title	Singer(s)	Length
1.	"Aathu Mettula"	S. P. Balasubrahmanyam, S. Janaki	5:01
2.	"Aadi Pattam"	Mano	5:03
3.	"Anba Sumanthu"	S. P. Balasubrahmanyam	4:59
4.	"Adiye Vanjikodi"	Ilaiyaraaja	4:55
5.	"Sindhu Nathi Seemane"	S. P. Balasubrahmanyam	4:50
6.	"Nenjukkule Innarendru"	S. P. Balasubrahmanyam, S. Janaki	4:55
7.	"Nenjukkule" (sad)	S. P. Balasubrahmanyam	5:05
Total length:			34:48

Telugu
No.	Title	Singer(s)	Length
1.	"Kallone Vunnavule"	S. P. Balasubrahmanyam, K. S. Chithra	5:14
2.	"Addirabanna"	S. P. Balasubrahmanyam	5:11
3.	"Yei Vannelannee"	S. P. Balasubrahmanyam, Chorus	5:03
4.	"Chinnari Naa Jaabili"	S. P. Balasubrahmanyam	4:56
5.	"Sande Maatuna"	S. P. Balasubrahmanyam, K. S. Chithra	5:09
6.	"Penchavu Amma Naannaga"	S. P. Balasubrahmanyam	5:10
7.	"Kallone Vunnavule – 1"	S. P. Balasubrahmanyam	4:52
Total length:			35:39

== Release and reception ==
Ponnumani was released on 16 April 1993. Malini Mannath of The Indian Express wrote, "The film is an average entertainer with Karthik getting enough scope to emote. For Soundarya, the role is a cake-walk". K. Vijiyan of New Straits Times appreciated Karthik's performance and the music but criticised the overuse of songs and the film's length. R. P. R. of Kalki praised Udayakumar's direction for making even little sequences poetic while also pointing out the flaws. Karthik won the Filmfare Award for Best Actor – Tamil.
