= Murai Maaman =

- DVD cover
- Directed by: Sundar C
- Written by: Sundar C
- Dialogue by: K. Selva Bharathy
- Produced by: N. Prabavathy: J. Jyothi Lakshmi; N. Vishnuram; N. Raghuram
- Starring: Jayaram; Khushbu
- Cinematography: U. K. Senthil Kumar
- Edited by: B. S. Vasu
- Music by: Vidyasagar
- Production company: Ganga Gowri Productions
- Release date: 19 May 1995
- Running time: 140 minutes
- Country: India
- Language: Tamil

Murai Maaman (transl. Mother's Brother) is a 1995 Indian Tamil-language comedy film and the directorial debut of Sundar C. The film stars Jayaram and Khushbu. It was released on 19 May 1995.

== Plot ==
Sirusu and his elder brother Perusu are rich bachelors who own a village cinema theatre and many orchards and farms. Their family receives the first respect in their region. For several years, his family feuded with the family of their rich relative Parameswaran Gounder. In the past, Sirusu's father was killed by Parameswaran's brother, who was sentenced to death, then Saratha (Sirusu's sister) secretly married a relative of Parameswaran's.

Saratha comes from Mumbai with her husband Sabapathy and her daughter Indhu. Sirusu falls in love with Indhu at first sight. Parameswaran Gounder and his son Ratnam Gounder propose to Sabapathy to marry Ratnam to Parameswaran's daughter. Indhu's father forces her to marry, but she refuses. Indhu decides to leave the village, but Sirusu stops her. Indhu says that she does not want to marry Ratnam and is not in love with Sirusu either. The villagers misunderstand their relationship. Indhu tells Ratnam that they were only talking, but Sirusu lies to marry Indhu.

Sirusu marries Indhu, as he wanted. However, Indhu refuses to live with him as his wife. Then, she becomes very ill, and he takes care of her. Sirusu's mother explains that he must place a statue of a god in the village temple to save Indhu. Sirusu accomplishes it with his brother's help, and Indhu understands Sirusu's feelings.

Ratnam's henchmen beat Sirusu, and he gets admitted to the hospital. Ratnam removes Indhu's Thaali and kidnaps her. A fight ensues, and Sirusu saves his wife. Parameswaran and Ratnam realise their mistakes and apologise to Sirusu. The two families unite and live happily.

== Cast ==
- Jayaram as Sirusu
- Khushbu as Indhu
- Goundamani as Perusu aka Pannai Gounder
- Manorama as Sirusu's mother
- Sangeetha as Saratha
- Jai Ganesh as Sabapathy, Saratha's husband
- Senthil as Chinna Thambi
- Vinu Chakravarthy as Parameswaran Gounder
- Kazan Khan as Rathnam Gounder
- Sundar C in a cameo appearance

== Production ==
Murai Maman is the directorial debut of Sundar C. He initially wanted a leading action hero to play the lead role and approached R. Sarathkumar, but the producer was unavailable to sign the actor. Subsequently, the director chose Jayaram to play the lead role. Sundar revealed that he tapped into his innate sense of humour, as Jayaram was very famous for his comedy in Malayalam films. Sundar created the protagonist's father and intended for an actor like Vijayakumar to play that role, but once it was changed to the protagonist's brother, Goundamani was cast.

== Soundtrack ==
The music was composed by Vidyasagar.

Track listing
| No. | Title | Lyrics | Singer(s) | Length |
|---|---|---|---|---|
| 1. | "Thenna Marathula" | Palani Bharathi | Malaysia Vasudevan, Sujatha | 04:44 |
| 2. | "Anandham Anandham" | Palani Bharathi | P. Unnikrishnan, Sujatha, Manorama | 05:24 |
| 3. | "Kangalai Thoothuviten" | Vairamuthu | Swarnalatha | 04:12 |
| 4. | "Poove Poove" | Vairamuthu | Ouseppachan | 04:04 |
| 5. | "Mannavargal Vantha Kudi" | Palani Bharathi | Sirkazhi G. Sivachidambaram, Deepan Chakravarthy | 04:39 |
| 6. | "Yennachi Yennachi" | Palani Bharathi | Arunmozhi, Sirkazhi G. Sivachidambaram, Swarnalatha | 04:24 |
| Total length: | | | | 27:27 |
