= Yajaman =

1993 film by R. V. Udayakumar

- Theatrical release poster
- Directed by: R. V. Udayakumar
- Screenplay by: R. V. Udayakumar
- Story by: Sujatha Udayakumar
- Produced by: M. Saravanan; M. Balasubramaniam; M. S. Guhan
- Starring: Rajinikanth; Meena; Aishwarya
- Cinematography: Karthik Raja
- Edited by: B. S. Nagaraj
- Music by: Ilaiyaraaja
- Production company: AVM Productions
- Release date: 18 February 1993
- Running time: 153 minutes
- Country: India
- Language: Tamil

Yajaman (transl. Figure Head) is a 1993 Indian Tamil-language action drama film written and directed by R. V. Udayakumar. The film stars Rajinikanth, Meena and Aishwarya, with M. N. Nambiar, Manorama, Vijayakumar and Napoleon in supporting roles. It was produced by M. Saravanan, M. S. Guhan and M. Subrahmaniam of AVM Productions. The film was released on 18 February 1993 and became commercially successful, with a 175-day theatrical run.

== Plot ==
Kanthavel Vanavarayan is a feudal chieftain, adored and respected by the people of his village near Pollachi. He lives with his grandparents. Following his advice, they abstain from voting in the elections and instead, pool the money given by the candidates to get themselves some basic amenities. Vallavaraayan is his archenemy. Their enmity is further sharpened when Vanavarayan wins the hand of Vaitheswari, whom Vallavaraayan had also wished to wed. Vallavaraayan then convinces the priest of the village temple to mix poison in the holy water that Vaitheswari drinks. As a result, she becomes incapable of conceiving a baby. But surprisingly, Vaitheswari soon becomes pregnant, though she has pretended with the help of the mid-wife, to do so to uphold her husband's honour. However, she takes poison and kills herself during the Seemantham celebration, unable to bear the grief of being incapable of giving her husband a child and on her deathbed makes Vanavarayan swear to take Ponni as his wife. Vanavarayan however refuses until Ponni agrees to marry Sembattai- Vallavarayan's henchman-who abandons her to Vallavarayan's vice. Infuriated, Vanavarayan attacks Vallavarayan, but spares his life after giving him a sermon on how to win the hearts of people.

== Cast ==
- Rajinikanth as Kanthavel Vanavarayan
- Meena as Vaitheswari
- Aishwarya as Ponni
- M. N. Nambiar as Kathavarayan
- Manorama as Akilandeswari
- Vijayakumar as Rajarathnam
- Napoleon as Veeravel Vallavarayan
- Goundamani as Vellaiyangiri
- Senthil as Azhagiri
- Peeli Sivam as Namachivayam
- Thalapathy Dinesh as Sembattai
- Rajesh Babu as Thandavarayan
- S. N. Lakshmi as Muppatha
- M. Varalakshmi as Sivakami
- Santhiya as Gowri

== Production ==
After the success of Chinna Gounder (1992), director R. V. Udayakumar was approached by various producers but he was unsure as to who should play the part of the hero for his next film. Subsequently, he decided to cast Rajinikanth as the hero for his next film. Rajinikanth agreed to act under the direction of Udayakumar. The director expressed his interest to make this film for AVM Productions. Initially, a different script titled Jilla Collector was narrated, but Udaykumar subsequently opted to film a different script altogether, which became Yajaman, since M. Saravanan of AVM felt that the original script might go over budget. Rajinikanth was initially reluctant to have Meena as the heroine because she had appeared as a child artist for his film Anbulla Rajinikanth (1984) and he felt that his fans might not readily accept this pairing. But he eventually agreed to have Meena play the part after she insisted. Rajinikanth also objected to Napoleon's casting as the antagonist due to him being younger than the character, but Udayakumar remained firm on casting him. Yajaman was Rajinikanth's 141st film and his 8th collaboration with AVM Productions. One of the filming locations was Samathur Jamindar Ramaraja Vanavarayar Palace at Pollachi while filming was also held at Andhra.

== Soundtrack ==
The music was composed by Ilaiyaraaja. Except for the song "Urakka Kathuthu Kozhi" which was penned by Vaali, all other songs were penned by Udayakumar himself. Many of the songs are set in Carnatic ragas; "Aalappol Velappol" is set in Sankarabharanam, "Yajaman Kaladi" is in Madhyamavati, "Nilave Mugam Kaattu" and "Oru Naalum" are set in Sindhubhairavi. The latter two songs were originally composed for Rasukutty (1992).

Track listing
No.	Title	Singer(s)	Length
1.	"Aalappol Velappol"	S. P. Balasubrahmanyam, K. S. Chithra	5:06
2.	"Adi Raakumuthu"	S. P. Balasubrahmanyam	5:10
3.	"Yajaman Kaladi"	Malaysia Vasudevan	4:08
4.	"Idiye Aanaalum Thangi Kollum"	Malaysia Vasudevan	1:44
5.	"Nilave Mugam"	S. P. Balasubrahmanyam, S. Janaki	5:06
6.	"Oru Naalum"	S. P. Balasubrahmanyam, S. Janaki	6:00
7.	"Thookkuchattiye"	Malaysia Vasudevan	3:56
8.	"Urakka Kathuthu Kozhi"	S. Janaki	5:04
Total length:			36:14

== Release and reception ==
Yajaman was released on 18 February 1993. When the film was released, it initially received unfavourable reception and did not do well in some areas. When Saravanan saw a letter written by a woman named Thilagavathi who reviewed the film, he used this letter as an advertisement for the film which led to the increase in collection. According to Saravanan, despite fans of Rajinikanth not liking the film, it picked up due to the support of general public.

Malini Mannath of The Indian Express wrote, "Yajaman is a well meant film from AVM and from director Udayakumar". K. Vijiyan of New Straits Times wrote, "The film begins well but gets bogged down after the interval and the large number of songs do not help matters". C. R. K. of Kalki praised the performances of artistes. At the 14th Cinema Express Awards, S. P. Balasubrahmanyam won the Best Playback Singer award.

== Legacy ==
Chinna Gounder and Yajaman started the trend of portrayals of village chieftain in Tamil films. Director Rajmohan directed a film titled Vanavarayan Vallavarayan (2014) named after Rajinikanth and Napoleon's characters. Dhanapal Padmanabhan who directed Krishnaveni Panjaalai (2012), rated Yajaman "as the film that best captured the village flavour and beauty of Pollachi".

== Bibliography ==
- Sundararaman (2007) [2005]. Raga Chintamani: A Guide to Carnatic Ragas Through Tamil Film Music (2nd ed.). Pichhamal Chintamani. OCLC 295034757.
- Saravanan, M. (2013) [2005]. AVM 60 Cinema (in Tamil) (3rd ed.). Rajarajan Pathippagam. OCLC 1158347612.
