= Singaravelan =

1992 film by R. V. Udayakumar

- Theatrical release poster
- Directed by: R. V. Udayakumar
- Screenplay by: R. V. Udayakumar
- Story by: Panchu Arunachalam
- Produced by: R. D. Bhaskar
- Starring: Kamal Haasan; Khushbu
- Cinematography: Abdul Rehman
- Edited by: B. Lenin; V. T. Vijayan
- Music by: Ilaiyaraaja
- Production company: Pavalar Creations
- Release date: 13 April 1992
- Running time: 150 minutes
- Country: India
- Language: Tamil

Singaravelan (/sɪŋɡɑːrəveɪlən/) is a 1992 Indian Tamil-language romantic comedy film written and directed by R. V. Udayakumar from a story by Panchu Arunachalam. The film stars Kamal Haasan and Khushbu. It revolves around a villager who is tasked with locating his urbanite cousin and marrying her, with the intention of reuniting their separated family.

Singaravelan was produced by R. D. Bhaskar under the production company Pavalar Creations. The film's soundtrack was composed by Ilaiyaraaja. Abdul Rahman handled cinematography, while B. Lenin and V. T. Vijayan handled editing respectively.

Singaravelan was released on 13 April 1992 and became a hit at the box office. Though the film attained cult status in Tamil cinema, it received criticism in later years for glorifying misogyny, sexism and stalking.

== Plot ==
Singaravelan "Velan" lives with his widowed mother Parvathy in a village. Velan's father died heartbroken that his marriage with Velan's mother was not accepted by her sister-in-law and they had broken all links. Further, they believe that it was Parvathy's curse that killed her brother and sister-in-law in a car accident and they get a promise from the guardian that their daughter should not be married to Parvathy's son. Velan's mother reveals that it is Velan's duty to marry her brother's daughter Sumathi to reunite the separated family. Armed with only a picture of the girl when she was four, he leaves for Madras to fulfil his mother's wishes.

Velan arrives at his friend Mano's house to implement his mission. Mano lives with three roommates: Mani, Subha, and Ramasamy. Velan explains his mission, and all of them agree to help him. At a computer centre, the clerk generates an image of the adolescent Sumathi. While at the beach, Velan and friends recognise a woman playing tennis as Sumathi. When Sumathi goes to fetch a ball from the sea, Velan goes to help her. He accidentally submerges her but manages to pull her out of the water. After regaining consciousness, she berates Velan as she knows swimming. Despite his friends' advice to leave Sumathi due to her arrogance, Velan refuses.

Velan and his friends follow Sumathi to a 5-star restaurant, where a flautist is performing. Once the performance ends, Sumathi kisses his hand. Velan too offers his hand to be kissed, wherein he is asked whether he knows anything about music. To prove her wrong, Velan sings a song while adorned with various musical instruments, but Sumathi insults the performance. Velan teases with harmless intention, and earns Sumathi's dislike.

Velan attempts to attract Thaiyamma, Sumathi's guardian, by visiting her house daily. Thaiyamma is attracted by Velan's entertaining nature. Velan lies by saying his mother's name as Mahalakshmi. Though Thaiyamma certifies Velan as a good man, Sumathi continues to hate him. Sumathi's uncle Natesan, a retired IG, visits Velan to warn him to stop teasing his niece. There, he realizes his father is Kaliannan Gounder, an industrialist who disowned him due to his passion for music. Unfortunately, he manages to meet Kaliannan to verify Velan's family background and finds everything true via Kaliannan. However, Velan and his friends have already visited Kaliannan and convinced him to lie to the general to help them out.

Velan manages to attract Sumathi gradually through a series of events, which makes Sumathi realize her femininity. Their love becomes strong when Sumathi hears that Velan is very serious at a hospital as he was attacked by some men hired by Natesan as he lied about being the son of an industrialist. She finds Velan dressed up with full bandages on his body (a drama by Velan who counterattacked the men sent by the uncle and instructs them to convey that the men attacked Velan, to Sumathi as part of the love mission). Velan's mother is informed about her son's hospitalization and immediately rushes to see him. There, she realizes the truth and feels easy. Velan and Sumathi's love grows steadily, and they decide to get engaged.

On the engagement day, through 'Sincere' Sivamani, the manager at Sumathi's factory, Sumathi learns that Velan is, in fact, the son of Parvathy, cancels the engagement and shuns him. Later, Natesan discovers that Sivamani has been using Sumathi's premises to print counterfeit bills. Sivamani kills Natesan and frames Velan. Velan escapes the police and goes on the run. His friends, mother, and Kaliannan are arrested as accomplices. Sivamani decides to kill Velan and marry Sumathi for her wealth and tricks Thaiyamma into accepting his proposal to marry Sumathi. He also uses one of his men to bring Velan in and to kill him, but Velan beats all the thugs and calls the police. Together with the police, Sivamani's ally, mother, and friends, Velan reaches the wedding hall and exposes Sivamani, who is arrested. Sumathi realises Velan's love and requests his mother to marry them. Velan and Sumathi then marry.

== Cast ==
- Kamal Haasan as Singaravelan a.k.a. Velan
- Khushbu as Sumathi
- Jaishankar as Natesan
- Manorama as Thaiyamma
- Goundamani as Drums Mani
- Sumithra as Parvathi
- C. R. Saraswathi as Sumathi's mother (cameo)
- Charle as Flute Ramasamy
- Vadivelu as "Michael Jackson Thangachi" Subha
- Mano as Mano
- V. K. Ramasamy as Kaliannan Gounder
- Vennira Aadai Moorthy as Doctor
- Sangili Murugan (cameo)
- Vinu Chakravarthy (cameo)
- Malaysia Vasudevan as Sumathi's father (cameo)
- Shanmugasundaram (cameo)
- Oru Viral Krishna Rao as marriage broker
- Nizhalgal Ravi as "Sincere" Sivamani
- Ajay as a thug
- Veeraraghavan as Commissioner
- Peeli Sivam as inspector
- Swaminathan as one of the constables
- Vijayakumar as Velan's father (uncredited)

== Production ==
A few scenes were shot at the Southern Railway Headquarters.

== Soundtrack ==
The soundtrack was composed by Ilaiyaraaja. The song "Innum Ennai Enna" is set in the Carnatic raga Nata, "Pudhu Cheri Katcheri" is set in Sankarabharanam, and "Thoodhu Selvadharadi" is set in Charukesi.

Track listing
| No. | Title | Lyrics | Singer(s) | Length |
|---|---|---|---|---|
| 1. | "Sonnapadi Kelu" | Vaali | Kamal Haasan, Chorus | 5:13 |
| 2. | "O Ranga Sriranga" | Gangai Amaran | S. P. Balasubrahmanyam, Arunmozhi, Saibaba, Chorus | 5:11 |
| 3. | "Innum Ennai Enna" | R. V. Udayakumar | S. P. Balasubrahmanyam, S. Janaki | 4:03 |
| 4. | "Pudhu Cheri Katcheri" | Vaali | S. P. Balasubrahmanyam, Yuvashankar, Pothirani, Harikrishna, Sathaya | 6:22 |
| 5. | "Thoodhu Selvadharadi" | Ponnadiyan | S. Janaki | 2:26 |
| 6. | "Pudhu Cheri Katcheri" (Sad) | Vaali | S. P. Balasubrahmanyam | 2:03 |
| 7. | "Pottu Vaitha Kathal Thittam" | Vaali | Kamal Haasan, Arunmozhi, Saibaba | 5:00 |
| Total length: | | | | 31:05 |

== Release and reception ==
Singaravelan was released on 13 April 1992, in the week of Puthandu. The Indian Express wrote, "The script betrays an episodic approach, but [Kamal Haasan] carries himself with poise in a role that does not make much demands on him, except for some spirited dancing and singing, and the pack of comedians made up of Goundamani, Charlie, Vadivelu and Manorama, despite some ridiculous attempts at humour off and on, make a generally good impression." Sriram of Vannathirai appreciated Udayakumar for giving a different kind of masala film starring Haasan. C. R. K. of Kalki called it an entertaining masala, but criticised the story. Singaravelan did well at the box office.

== Legacy ==
Singaravelan attained cult status in Tamil cinema. The scene where the title character and his friends visits a computer centre to digitally visualise what Sumathi would look like in present-day gained popularity for its comedy. Despite its cult status, the film drew criticism in later years for glorifying misogyny, sexism and stalking.

== Bibliography ==
- Sundararaman (2007) [2005]. Raga Chintamani: A Guide to Carnatic Ragas Through Tamil Film Music (2nd ed.). Pichhamal Chintamani. OCLC 295034757.
