= Ingu Mirugangal Vaazhum Idam =

Indian Tamil-language crime thriller film

- Theatrical release poster
- Directed by: S. Sasikumar
- Written by: S. Sasikumar
- Produced by: Fine John
- Starring: Fine John; Sreedevi Unnikrishnan
- Cinematography: Chandran Chami
- Edited by: Ram Gopi
- Music by: Vidhaya Sharan
- Production company: Finejohn Pictures
- Distributed by: Action Reaction Jenish
- Release date: 26 April 2024
- Country: India
- Language: Tamil

Ingu Mirugangal Vaazhum Idam (transl. This is where animals live) is a 2024 Indian Tamil-language crime thriller film written and directed by S. Sasikumar. The film stars Fine John and Sreedevi Unnikrishnan was produced by Fine John under the banner of Finejohn Pictures.

== Synopsis ==
John works in the Security Guard Office and is single-handedly raising his only daughter, Jenny. Genie, who has an inordinate affection for her father, looks after John. However, her boyfriend, rapes and murders Jenny along with his friend

== Cast ==
- Fine John
- Sreedevi Unnikrishnan

== Production ==
The film was shot in Chennai and Trichy.

== Reception ==
Critics from Maalai Malar and Dinakaran gave mixed reviews.
