= Pelli Sandadi =

1996 Indian film by K. Raghavendra Rao

- DVD Cover
- Directed by: K. Raghavendra Rao
- Written by: Screenplay: K. Raghavendra Rao; Story & Dialogues: Satyanand
- Produced by: C. Aswani Dutt; Allu Aravind
- Starring: Srikanth; Ravali; Deepti Bhatnagar
- Cinematography: V. Jayaram
- Edited by: Marthand K. Venkatesh
- Music by: M. M. Keeravani
- Production company: Sri Raghavendra Movie Corporation
- Distributed by: Geetha Arts
- Release date: 12 January 1996
- Running time: 129 minutes
- Country: India
- Language: Telugu
- Budget: ₹1.25 crore (Note: Eenadu reported the budget to be ₹85 lakh and the box office gross as ₹15 crore. One of the producers, C. Aswani Dutt, mentioned that the film was budgeted at ₹1.25 crore and grossed ₹12 crores.)
- Box office: est. ₹12–15 crore

Pelli Sandadi (transl. Wedding euphoria) is a 1996 Indian Telugu-language musical romance film directed by K. Raghavendra Rao. Produced by C. Aswani Dutt and Allu Aravind on Sri Raghavendra Movie Corporation banner, the film stars Srikanth, Ravali, and Deepti Bhatnagar, with music composed by M. M. Keeravani.

The film was released on 12 January 1996 and became a major commercial success. Made on a budget of ₹1.25 crore, the film grossed ₹12–15 crore at the box office, making it the second-highest-grossing Telugu film of the year after Ninne Pelladata. Pelli Sandadi received critical acclaim, winning five Nandi Awards and a Filmfare Award.

The film's success led to several adaptations, including remakes in Bengali as Biyer Phool (1996), in Hindi as Mere Sapno Ki Rani (1997) and in Tamil as Ninaithen Vandhai (1998). A spiritual sequel, Pelli SandaD, was released in 2021.

== Plot ==
Vijay Krishna (Srikanth) is a musician from a musical family. He lives with two married sisters, their husbands, and his uncle. His whole family is dedicated to music. His father (Satyanarayana) is looking for a suitable matrimonial alliance for Vijay, who is in search of a girl whom he saw in a dream. He never saw her face in the dream, but he saw a mole beside her belly button. The story continues in search of the girl. Meanwhile, his father arranges his marriage to Kalyani (Ravali), who hails from a nearby village and belongs to a musical family.

Meanwhile, Vijay gets a job in Ooty as a music lecturer. There, he finds his dream girl, Swapna (Deepti Bhatnagar). He falls in love with her and proposes, which she accepts. He returns home to share the news about his love, but his father arranges the marriage. Later, Swapna learns that the person she loves and Kalyani's fiancé are the same. Swapna and Kalyani are actually sisters. Swapna then sacrifices her love and informs her sister that she has a terminal illness. She asks Vijay, as her dying wish, to marry Kalyani. Meanwhile, Kalyani also learns that Vijay loves her younger sister Swapna. Eventually, Kalyani convinces her sister to marry Vijay, and the film ends on a happy note.

== Cast ==
- Srikanth as Vijay Krishna
- Ravali as Kalyani (Voice Dubbed by Shilpa)
- Deepti Bhatnagar as Swapna (Voice Dubbed by Roja Ramani)
- Kaikala Satyanarayana as Vijay's father
- M. Balaiah as Kalyani and Swapna's father
- Brahmanandam as N. V. Krishna, Vijay's uncle
- Tanikella Bharani as Vijay's brother-in-law
- Sivaji Raja as Vijay's brother-in-law
- Babu Mohan as Kalyani and Swapna's uncle
- A.V.S. as Kalyani and Swapna's uncle
- Sri Lakshmi as Kalyani and Swapna's aunt
- Chitti Babu as Paidi Talli
- Raja Ravindra as Quarry Engineer
- Gundu Hanumantha Rao as Priest
- Rajitha
- Ananth
- Suthi Velu
- Jenny
- Visweswara Rao

== Production ==
Raghavendra Rao, who has made films with big stars, decided to make a low-budget film with three producers: Aswini Dutt, Allu Aravind, and Jagadish Prasad. The filming began with the song "Sarigamapadanisa" with Aamir Khan applauding it. The choreography for all the songs were designed by Raghavendra Rao himself. The song "Soundarya Lahari" was shot for 40 days, with each shot taken at each place, while the shoot of the song "Aina Chikkaledu" began from 9:00 A.M. in the morning to 1:00 P.M. in the afternoon.

== Release ==
The film grossed ₹12–15 crore at the box office. It grossed ₹1.25 crore at Sandhya theatre in Hyderabad. The film had a 100-day theatrical run at 34 locations.

== Soundtrack ==
The soundtrack of the film was composed by M. M. Keeravani. Each song is set in major raagas of Carnatic music, such as Hindolam.

No	Song	Singer(s)	Lyricist
1	"Hrudayamane"	K. S. Chithra, S. P. Balasubrahmanyam	Sirivennela Seetharama Sastry
2	"Soundarya Lahari"	K. S. Chithra, S. P. Balasubrahmanyam	Sirivennela Seetharama Sastry
3	"Kila Kila Kila"	K. S. Chithra, S. P. Balasubrahmanyam	Veturi Sundararama Murthy
4	"Maa Perati Jaam Chettu"	K. S. Chithra, S. P. Balasubrahmanyam	Veturi Sundararama Murthy
5	"Chemma Chekka"	K. S. Chithra, S. P. Balasubrahmanyam	Veturi Sundararama Murthy
6	"Nava Manmadhuda"	K. S. Chithra	Samavedam Shanmukhasarma
7	"Ramya Krishna Laaga"	Mano, M. M. Keeravani	Jonnavithula
8	"Ayina Chikkaledhu"	M. M. Keeravani	M. M. Keeravani
9	"Sarigama Padhanisa"	S. P. Balasubrahmanyam	Chandrabose

== Awards ==
Filmfare Awards South

- Filmfare Award for Best Music Director – Telugu – M. M. Keeravani

Nandi Awards

- Best Home Viewing Feature Film – Allu Aravind
- Best Director – K. Raghavendra Rao
- Best Choreographer – K. Raghavendra Rao
- Best Music Director – M. M. Keeravani

== Remakes ==
The film was remade in Bengali as Biyer Phool (1996), in Hindi as Mere Sapno Ki Rani (1997) and in Tamil as Ninaithen Vandhai (1998).
