= Subash (film) =

- Poster
- Directed by: R. V. Udayakumar
- Screenplay by: R. V. Udayakumar
- Story by: Sujatha Udhayakumar
- Produced by: K. S. Srinivasan; K. S. Sivaraman
- Starring: Arjun; Revathi
- Cinematography: Siva
- Edited by: B. S. Nagaraj
- Music by: Vidyasagar
- Production company: Sivasree Pictures
- Release date: 21 September 1996
- Running time: 150 minutes
- Country: India
- Language: Tamil

Subash (/sʊbɑːʃ/) is a 1996 Indian Tamil-language action film directed by R. V. Udayakumar. The film stars Arjun and Revathi. It was the last film featuring Silk Smitha, whose body was found two days after the release of the film. The film was released on 21 September 1996.

== Plot ==
Subash is portrayed as a troublemaker. His brother, Rajasekhar is a government minister. Their father is a judge who was previously involved in a scandal. Subash falls in love with Savitri, a middle-class Brahmin girl. Although Savitri loves Subash, she wants to marry someone successful and ambitious. Subash subsequently joins the Army and becomes a military officer. Upon his return from a military camp, his family share the news that Savitri and her father have died in a mysterious accident. Arumugasamy, an honest politician, a member of Rajasekhar's opposition party, as well as Subash's best friend, are also believed to have died. Subash suspects Thangamani, Arumugasamy's right hand, as the killer. Subash finds Savitri in Thangamani's house and rescues her.

Savitri reveals that Rajasekhar is a corrupt politician involved with terrorist groups. Rajasekhar's henchmen kill Arumugasamy, and Thangamani hold Savitri captive. Heartbroken, Subash resolves to punish his brother and save his country from terrorists. Later, Savithri has an accident and loses her memory. Subash marries Savitri in front of his family. He follows his brother and learns of his plans to kill all the religious leaders of India in the peace yatra. Subash and his father try to expose Rajasekar's plans, but Rajasekar's partner uses his influence to get orders for Subash to return to the army base immediately. To obtain additional leave for Subash, his father commits suicide. Subash's leave is extended to attend the funeral, allowing Subash to stop his brother's plan. Subash kills Rajasekar and his associates. Finally, Subash resigns from his commission, having attained the rank of Colonel.

== Cast ==
- Arjun as Colonel Subash
- Revathi as Savithri
- Monica Bedi as Anitha
- Siddique as Rajasekhar
- Prakash Raj as Arumugasamy
- Mounika as Arumugasamy's wife
- Jaishankar as Subash's father
- Manivannan as Thangamani
- Vadivelu as Subash's friend
- Vivek as Subash's friend
- R. N. K. Prasad as Indian Army General
- Sudha as Lakshmi
- K. R. Vatsala as Nithyananda Swamy's assistant
- Y. Vijaya as Anitha's mother
- Hemanth as Nithyananda Swamy
- Sukran as Subash's friend
- Silk Smitha in a special appearance for the song "Hey Saloma Salo"

== Production ==
Subash was initially titled August 15th. After the change of title, composer Karthik Raja was replaced by Vidyasagar. This film was actress Silk Smitha's last release.

== Soundtrack ==
The music was composed by Vidyasagar, with lyrics by the director R. V. Udayakumar.

Song	Singers	Duration
"Hawala"	Mano, Swarnalatha	4:29
"Kudi Magan"	Chorus	1:30
"Mugam Enna"	S. P. Balasubrahmanyam, S. Janaki	4:41
"Hey Saloma"	Vidyasagar, Swarnalatha	5:20
"Hero Honda"	Arjun, Sujatha	4:37
"Thendral Mela"	S. P. Balasubrahmanyam, K. S. Chithra	4:21

== Reception ==
R. P. R. of Kalki praised the forest chase in the beginning of the film, giving time space for every scenes without wrapping up and also made sure the fim does not become boring while also praising Jaishankar's performance and handling patriotism naturally. K. N. Vijiyan of New Straits Times wrote, "There are enough twists in the story to keep our interest, at least initially. It's only when the politician angle comes in that you lose interest. The story then works its way to its predictable end".
