= Red Label (film) =

Indian Tamil-language film

- Theatrical release poster
- Directed by: K. R. Vinoth
- Written by: Pon Parthiban
- Produced by: Lenin
- Starring: Lenin; Azmin Yasar; R. V. Udayakumar; Munishkanth
- Cinematography: Sathish Maiappan
- Edited by: Lawrence Kishore
- Music by: Kailas Menon
- Production company: Revgen Film Factory
- Release date: 6 February 2026
- Country: India
- Language: Tamil

Red Label is a 2026 Indian Tamil-language film directed by K. R. Vinoth and written by Pon Parthiban. The film stars Lenin and Azmin Yasar in the lead roles alongside R. V. Udayakumar, Munishkanth, Anu Mohan and others in important roles. The film is also produced by the lead actor Lenin under his Revgen Film Factory banner. It was released in theatres on 6 February 2026.

== Cast ==
- Lenin as Kathir
- Azmin Yasar as Pavithra
- R. V. Udayakumar as MLA
- Munishkanth
- Anu Mohan

== Music ==
The film has music composed by Kailas Menon. The first single titled "Milira" was released on 5 December 2025.

Track listing
No.	Title	Singer(s)	Length
1.	"Milira"	Chinmayi Sripada
2.	"Raakku Raakkachi"	Velmurugan, Kavitha Gopi

== Release and reception ==
Red Label was theatrically released on 6 February 2026. Abhinav Subramanian of The Times of India gave 2 out of 5 stars and wrote "Red Label has enough of a plot to keep you seated, but sits so comfortably in its template that it never once risks surprising you." A critic of Dinamalar also rated the film with 2 out of 5 stars. Dina Thanthi reviewed the film by stating that the film is watchable without any shortage of excitement.
