= Hello (1999 film) =

- Poster
- Directed by: K. Selva Bharathy
- Written by: K. Selva Bharathy
- Produced by: Thiruvengadam
- Starring: Prashanth; Preeti Jhangiani
- Cinematography: Vijay Milton
- Edited by: B. S. Vasu; Saleem
- Music by: Deva
- Production company: Serene Movie Makers
- Release date: 7 November 1999
- Running time: 158 minutes
- Country: India
- Language: Tamil

Hello is a 1999 Indian Tamil-language romantic drama film directed and written by K. Selva Bharathy. The film stars Prashanth and Preeti Jhangiani. It was released on 7 November 1999.

== Plot ==
Chandru works in a flower shop. He tries to woo girls and enter into a relationship, but it does not materialise. His friends tease him for being unable to find a girlfriend. Chandru has a plan to prevent them making fun of him. He requests his close friend Gayathri to come to the temple along with some of her friends so he would introduce her as his girlfriend to his friends. Chandru takes his friends with him to temple with plans of introducing Gayatri's friend as his lover. Unfortunately, Gayatri does not turn up that day, and Chandru simply points out a girl among the crowd in the temple as his lover to his friends. Chandru pretends as if he is talking frequently over phone to his lover so that his friends would believe him.

Suresh is Charle's friend who comes to Chennai to visit a girl for marriage proposal. He is introduced to Chandru, and they become good friends. Chandru's friends accompany Suresh while he goes to meet the girl, whose name is Swetha and inform Suresh that Swetha is in love with Chandru. Suresh feels bad that he has come to meet his friend's lover. All three leave the place without informing them. Suresh apologises to Chandru for the incident that happened, which shocks him. Meanwhile, Swetha's brother Sekhar gets furious, meets Charle, and asks for the reason for them to stop the marriage proposal. Charle reveals that Chandru and Swetha are in love. Shekar scolds Swetha, even though she tries to prove her innocence. She feels bad that no one in her family trusts her.

Swetha consumes poison and is admitted in the hospital. Also, Shekar beats up Chandru's friends, and they are admitted in the same hospital. Chandru comes to the hospital to meet his friends and is surprised to know that Gayatri and Swetha are good friends. Gayatri tells about Swetha consuming poison, which makes Chandru feels guilty that he is responsible for all the fiascos at Swetha's house. With Gayatri's help, Chandru gets introduced to Swetha but does not disclose the truth to her. Slowly, Swetha and Chandru become good friends. Chandru also earns the trust of Swetha's family members. Gayatri gets to know that Swetha loves Chandru, and she informs him about this. Swetha's family also likes Chandru, and they decide to get them married. One day, Suresh comes to wish Chandru, knowing about his marriage. Swetha's family members get shocked seeing Chandru and Suresh together. Finally, Chandru reveals the truth, apologises, and clarifies that his intention is not to cheat Swetha. Swetha's family members get convinced, and Chandru and Swetha unite.

== Cast ==
- Prashanth as Chandru
- Preeti Jhangiani as Swetha
- Ranjith as Sekhar
- Sujitha as Gayathri
- Manivannan as Flower Shop Owner
- Charle as Chandru's friend
- Vaiyapuri as Chandru's friend
- Suresh as Suresh
- Senthil as Flower Shop Worker
- Ilavarasi
- R. Sundarrajan
- Kaka Radhakrishnan
- Kanal Kannan
- R. Sundaramoorthy

== Production ==
The film marked the second venture for director K. Selva Bharathy, while it also featured Preeti Jhangiani in her first Tamil film. Being unfamiliar with the language, Jhangiani mouthed her longer on-screen dialogues in Hindi, and was later dubbed over by a voice artist. The actress also noted that the production of Hello was completed swiftly.

== Soundtrack ==
The soundtrack was composed by Deva. The superhit song "Salam Gulamu" was reused as "Salam Gulabi" in the 2004 Kannada film Baithare Baithare.

Song	Singer(s)	Lyrics	Duration
"Salam Gulamu"	Sukhwinder Singh	Na. Muthukumar	05:20
"Chella Chella"	Srinivas, Anuradha Sriram	Vairamuthu	05:07
"B.B.C Pola"	S. P. Balasubrahmanyam	Vairamuthu	04:52
"Valantines"	Shankar Mahadevan, Sabesh	Vairamuthu	05:45
"Intha Nimisham"	Hariharan, K. S. Chithra	Vairamuthu	05:45
"Salam Gulamu" II	Naveen	Na. Muthukumar	05:21

== Reception ==
Aurangazeb of Kalki wrote dragging length in second half as the biggest flaws but since the humour makes us forget those flaws Selvabharathi has scored pass mark for second time. Malathi Rangarajan of The Hindu wrote, "Prashanth as the hero Chandru does a neat job. The choreography for the songs is appealing and Prashanth's elegant movements enhance the appeal. The wonderful locations are an added feast for the eyes". Chennai Online wrote, "To push his narration forward, the director forces in a lot of accidental encounters and co-incidences that brings the hero and the heroine to the same places at the same time".
