= K. Selva Bharathy =

Indian film director

- Born: Selvabharathi Kumarasamy; 25 September 1964 (age 62); Tamil Nadu, India
- Occupation: Film director writer
- Years active: 1995–present

K. Selva Bharathy is an Indian film director and dialogue writer, who works in Tamil cinema. He was one time assistant of late director-actor Manivannan. He was also an erstwhile dialogue writer for director Sundar C. He has directed nine films in his illustrious career since making his directorial debut in 1998.

== Career ==
He made his directorial debut with the Tamil film Ninaithen Vandhai (1998) starring Vijay in the main lead role alongside Rambha and Devayani. Ninaithen Vandhai was a Tamil remake of the Telugu film Pelli Sandadi (1996) and became a successful venture at the Tamil Nadu box office. He had insisted that he opted to use body double of Rambha instead of casting Rambha herself in "Vannanilavae Vannanilavae" song sequence in Ninaithen Vandhai. Selva eventually wanted to shoot the song with both Vijay and Rambha, but Rambha during the meantime had given callsheet to a Telugu film and the director decided to not disturb Rambha due to her Telugu film commitments. It was without the knowledge of Rambha that director went ahead with the strategy of incorporating a body double option by roping in a dancer who could ideally fit in Rambha's mould in order to complete the shooting of the song.

Following the success of Ninaithen Vandhai, he collaborated with Vijay again in two more remakes; Priyamaanavale (2000) with Simran and Vaseegara (2003) with Sneha which were also well received by the audience. His other directorial ventures post Vaseegara, such as Anbe Vaa (2005), Pasupathy c/o Rasakkapalayam (2007), Murattu Kaalai (2012) and Kadhalai Thavira Verondrum Illai (2014) did not exactly live up to the expectations as they were considered predominantly as low profile releases and were deemed below average in the box office. He frequently collaborated with comedian Vivek in Anbe Vaa, Pasupathy c/o Rasakkapalayam and Murattu Kaalai whereas Vivek's comical hilarious performances had turned out to be the only saving graces in those films that kept the films somewhat engaging to a certain extent. Selva Bharathy cast in blind musician Comagan alongside other Raaga Priya orchestra members for the song "Uyir Thantha Thaye" for the emotional climax sequence in Pasupathy c/o Rasakkapalayam.

== Filmography ==
Director

Year	Film	Notes			
Year	Film	Notes	1998	Ninaithen Vandhai	Remake of Telugu film Pelli Sandadi
1999	Hello				
2000	Priyamaanavale	Remake of Telugu film Pavitra Bandham			
2002	Vivaramana Aalu				
2003	Vaseegara	Remake of Telugu film Nuvvu Naaku Nachav			
2005	Anbe Vaa				
2007	Pasupathi c/o Rasakkapalayam				
2012	Murattu Kaalai				
2014	Kadhalai Thavira Verondrum Illai				

Writer

Year	Film	Credited as	Notes
Year	Film	Writer	Notes
1995	Murai Maman	Dialogues	
1995	Murai Mappillai	Dialogues	
1996	Ullathai Allitha	Dialogues	
1996	Mettukudi	Dialogues	
1997	Janakiraman	Story	
1997	V.I.P	Dialogues	
1997	Adrasakkai Adrasakkai	Dialogues	
1998	Moovendhar	Story and dialogues	
1999	Azhagarsamy	Dialogues	
2005	Thaka Thimi Tha	Story and dialogues	
2008	Vambu Sandai	Story and dialogues	
2019	Vantha Rajavathaan Varuven	Dialogues	

Actor

Year	Title	Role	Notes
2010	Moscowin Kavery	Kaveri's father	

Lyricist

Year	Title	Song	Composer	Notes
2005	Anbe Vaa	"Alek Alek", "Naan Unnai", "Pudikkavillaida"	D. Imman	
2005	Thaka Thimi Thaa	"Idhu Kallooriyalla"	D. Imman	
2007	Pasupathy C/o Rasakkapalayam	all songs	Deva	
2012	Murattu Kaalai	all songs	Srikanth Deva	
2013	Kadhalai Thavira Verondrum Illai	all songs	Srikanth Deva	
