= Ninaithen Vanthai =

- Poster
- Directed by: K. Selva Bharathy
- Screenplay by: K. Selva Bharathy
- Story by: Sathyanand
- Based on: Pelli Sandadi (Telugu); By K. Raghavendra Rao
- Produced by: Allu Aravind; C. Ashwani Dutt; K. Raghavendra Rao
- Starring: Vijay; Rambha; Devayani
- Cinematography: Ilavarasu
- Edited by: B. S. Vasu; Saleem
- Music by: Deva
- Production company: Sri Raghavendra Movie Corporation
- Distributed by: Geetha Arts
- Release date: 10 April 1998
- Running time: 149 minutes
- Country: India
- Language: Tamil

Ninaithen Vanthai (transl. When I Thought [of You], [You] Arrived) is a 1998 Indian Tamil-language romantic musical comedy film directed by K. Selva Bharathy (in his directorial debut) and produced by Allu Aravind. It is the Tamil remake of the 1996 Telugu film Pelli Sandadi. The film stars Vijay, Rambha and Devayani in the lead roles, while Manivannan, Malaysia Vasudevan, Ranjith, Senthil, and Vinu Chakravarthy play supporting roles. The music was composed by Deva.

Ninaithen Vanthai released on 10 April 1998. It received positive reviews and became a commercial success.

== Plot ==
Gokula Krishnan is a music-loving man who begins the film with a dream where he sees his dream girl. The only trademark he remembers from it is a mole which is situated next to her navel. He then becomes determined in looking for his dream girl with the help of his uncle and brothers-in-law. On the other hand, his father Sandhana Goundar arranges his marriage to a village girl named Savithri, which Gokul (often referred to as "Mapillai") objects to, but Savithri loves him. Gokul later sees his dream girl, Swapna, at a wedding, where he spots the mole on her navel. He then sings to her, impressing her, but she leaves abruptly. He later sees her at a music class which he teaches, and from then on, they love each other. Gokul tries to stop the marriage with Savithri in many failed attempts due to everyone in Savithri's family getting the wrong impression. Swapna then arrives to Savithri's village, and it is revealed that they are sisters. Neither of them knew that they love the same man.

Gokul tells Savithri's father that he does not want the marriage, which Swapna overhears. Knowing how much her sister loves him, Swapna is determined to get Gokul to forget her by faking that she has a blood clot in her heart. After much persuasion, Gokul agrees to marry Savithri. Throughout the film, another man, Vignesh, is in love with Swapna and tries to get her to marry him and if not, he will kill her with him also. When Vignesh (after almost killing Savithri) reveals that he loved Swapna but said that she will only love and marry Gokul, Savithri lets Swapna marry him.

== Cast ==
- Vijay as Gokula Krishnan (Gokul)
- Rambha as Swapna (Voice dubbed by Jayageetha)
- Devayani as Savithri (voice dubbed by Sreeja Ravi)
- Manivannan as Gopalakrishnan Gounder, Gokul's uncle
- Senthil as Swapna's and Savithri's uncle
- Vinu Chakravarthy as Sandhana Goundar, Gokul's father
- Malaysia Vasudevan as Vasudevan, Swapna's and Savithri's father
- R. Sundarrajan as Swapna's and Savithri's uncle
- Ranjith as Vignesh, Swapna's one side lover
- Charle as Gokul's brother-in-law
- S. N. Lakshmi as Swapna's and Savithri's grandmother
- C. R. Saraswathi as Swapna's and Savithri's aunt
- Halwa Vasu as Gokul's brother-in-law
- Latha as Gokul's sister
- Pasi Narayanan

== Production ==
The film was a Tamil remake of the Telugu film Pelli Sandadi (1996). The film marked the debut of Sundar C's erstwhile dialogue writer K. Selva Bharathy. Filming began in April 1997, when Vijay was simultaneously having schedules for his mid 1997 and the late 1997 releases, such as Once More and Nerrukku Ner, and took place until October 1997, after which Vijay started attending shooting for his next romantic drama film, Kadhalukku Mariyadhai. Actor and comedian Goundamani was initially expected to portray the main comedian role, but eventually did not feature, and was replaced by Senthil.

Director Selva Bharathy had insisted that he opted to use body double of Rambha instead of casting Rambha herself in the song "Vannanilavae Vannanilavae". Selva eventually wanted to shoot the song with both Vijay and Rambha, but Rambha during the meantime had given callsheet to a Telugu film and the director decided to not disturb Rambha due to her Telugu film commitments. It was without the knowledge of Rambha that director went ahead with the strategy of incorporating a body double option by roping in a dancer who could ideally fit in Rambha's mould in order to complete the shooting of the song.

== Soundtrack ==
The music was composed by Deva. The audio rights were acquired by Star Music India and Pyramid Audio. Three of the tunes were borrowed from the original Telugu film (Unnai Ninaithu, Pottu Vaithu & Un Marbile Vizhi). The song "Vannanilavae Vannanilavae" is set to the raga Madhukauns, "Unai Ninaithu Naan Enai" and "Un Marbile Vizhi Moodi" are set to Hindolam, "Maligayae Maligaiyae" and "Ennavale Ennavale" are set to Shuddha Dhanyasi and "Pottu Vaithu Poomudikkum" is set to Hamsanandi.

Song	Singer(s)	Lyricist	Duration
"Unai Ninaithu Naan Enai"	S. P. Balasubrahmanyam, K. S. Chithra, Sujatha	Vaali	5:07
"Vannanilavae Vannanilavae"	Hariharan	Palani Bharathi	5:07
"Ennavale Ennavale"	Mano, Anuradha Sriram	Palani Bharathi	4:58
"Maligayae Maligaiyae"	K. S. Chithra, Anuradha Sriram	Palani Bharathi	4:54
"Un Marbile Vizhi Moodi"	K. S. Chithra	Palani Bharathi	4:56
"Pottu Vaithu Poomudikkum"	S. P. Balasubrahmanyam, Swarnalatha	Palani Bharathi	4:47
"Manisha Manisha"	Deva, Sabesh, Krishnaraj	K. Selva Bharathy	5:13

== Release and reception ==
Ninaithen Vanthai was initially planned to be released in December 1997, during the Christmas, but was postponed to be released on 10 April 1998, to avoid clash with another Vijay starrer, Kadhalukku Mariyadhai, which was filmed only after this film, although that was released before this film, in December 1997. D. S. Ramanujam of The Hindu wrote, "Debutant director K. Selvabharathi sets a brisk pace throughout, bringing out the finer moments of the love-struck trio with adequate situations". Ananda Vikatan gave the film a score of 35 out of 100. R. P. R. of Kalki called it a classic story which can be watched once only for thrills.

The success of the film prompted the makers to sign on Rambha to appear alongside Vijay in two of his next projects – Endrendrum Kadhal (1999) and Minsara Kanna (1999).
