= Chinna Gounder =

1992 film by R. V. Udayakumar

- Poster
- Directed by: R. V. Udayakumar
- Screenplay by: R. V. Udayakumar
- Story by: R. Selvaraj
- Produced by: V. Mohan; V. Natarajan
- Starring: Vijayakanth; Sukanya
- Cinematography: A. Karthik Raja
- Edited by: B. S. Nagaraj
- Music by: Ilaiyaraaja
- Production company: Anandhi Films
- Distributed by: Balakrishna Pictures
- Release date: 15 January 1992
- Running time: 143 minutes
- Country: India
- Language: Tamil

Chinna Gounder (transl. Junior Gounder) is a 1992 Indian Tamil-language drama film directed by R. V. Udayakumar. The film stars Vijayakanth and Sukanya, while Manorama, Salim Ghouse, Sathyapriya, Goundamani, Senthil, and Vadivelu play supporting roles. The music was composed by Ilaiyaraaja with cinematography by A. Karthik Raja and editing by B. S. Nagaraj. The film released on 15 January 1992, during Pongal. The film was remade in Telugu as Chinarayudu, and in Kannada as Chikkejamanru.

== Plot ==
Thavasi, also known as Chinna Gounder, is a wealthy and respected landlord in his village near Pollachi. His family has served as the hereditary Village Judge for a group of 18 villages, and Thavasi took over this role 10 years after his father's death. Thavasi's father, who was in ill health, was asked to preside over a very complex case and died before delivering a verdict. The case involved a newly built village temple that stood on land belonging to Sundari, Sakkarai's second wife. Sakkarai's first wife is Thavasi's elder sister. Sakkarai had cited the law and sealed off the temple premises a day before its opening. Thavasi investigates the case, clearly proving that the land purchase document is a forgery, and concludes that the temple premises belong to the village. He is commended by a district judge for his swift decision-making skills.

Chinna Gounder lives with his mother Meiyatha and is the most respected person in the village, known for his sense of justice and loyalty. There is rivalry between Chinna Gounder and his brother-in-law Sakkara Gounder, who is accused of causing Chinna Gounder's sister's death and subsequently marrying Sundari. Sakkara Gounder plans to grab the local temple premises by forging false documents. Chinna Gounder exposes the fraud, thereby preventing the temple premises from going into the hands of the roadies. Sakkara Gounder is angered and waits for an opportunity to knock out Chinna Gounder.

Deivanai, a poor, talkative village belle, often gets into silly verbal conflicts with Chinna Gounder and his mother. One day, when Chinna Gounder is walking through the village, some children complain that Deivanai is holding their spinning tops and ask him to get them back from her. Chinna Gounder goes to talk to Deivanai, but she challenges him in the spinning top game. The challenge was that losers should lie down and the top will leave to spin on their belly. Afraid of losing the bet, he escaped from there, then she said jokingly that he must come to play the game. On that day, he learned to spin the top and won the game the next day. Deivanai returned the tops to the children and tried to escape from the punishment, but Gounder and the children were surrounded. She was lying down by them, and Gounder left a spinning top to spin on her stomach. She screams in embarrassment.

Chinna Gounder and Deivanai fall in love in the ensuing hilarious fights. Later, Deivanai saves Meiyatha from a snakebite. When Chinna Gounder rewards her with money, Deivanai refuses it, reasoning that she saved his mother only out of respect. Chinna Gounder falls in love with her good attitude, boldness, and self-respect. Deivanai owes Sakkara Gounder money, which she borrowed for her younger sister's education. As she could not repay the debt on time, she invites the villagers for Moi Virunthu (one who eats food at her house has to contribute money to settle her dues) as per village custom. Chinna Gounder visits without invitation, but proposes to her. She agrees to the same.

Chinna Gounder is married to Deivanai, and life progresses smoothly for some time, until Sakkara Gounder interferes with a plan. Sakkara Gounder poisons the local pond and blames Chinna Gounder. He also sets up a false witness to trap Chinna Gounder. Deivanai overhears Sakkara Gounder's plans. While trying to stop the witness from reaching the panchayat, she attacks the witness with a sickle. Later, the police arrests Deivanai with a murder charge, as the man whom she attacked is dead. Deivanai is imprisoned. Deivanai's sister now comes to Chinna Gounder's home as she is left alone. One day, it is revealed that Deivanai's sister is pregnant, and Chinna Gounder is blamed. As Chinna Gounder also remains silent over the issue, his mother sends him out of the house. Deivanai is shocked to hear this and believes that her husband has betrayed her trust and love. She refuses to meet him when he comes to visit her in jail. Now the advocate, who already knows about Chinna Gounder, finds out that he is in trouble and decides to offer help. He takes over the case in favour of Deivanai and begins his groundwork. He gets the postmortem report and finds out that the cause of death of the man attacked by Deivanai was only due to a lack of breath.

A few months pass, and Deivanai comes out of jail to visit her sister, who is about to deliver a baby. She scolds her sister for having an illicit relationship with Chinna Gounder. However, her sister reveals that he is in no way related to her pregnancy, and the father of the child is the witness whom Deivanai attacked. As Chinna Gounder did not want to tarnish her image in front of the villagers, he accepted the blame. Deivanai's sister gives birth to a baby and dies. Deivanai realises her mistake and apologises to her husband. Later, Deivanai is kidnapped by Sakkara Gounder. Chinna Gounder comes to her rescue and saves her. Chinna Gounder produces Sakkara Gounder in front of the village panchayat, where it is revealed that it Sakkara Gounder killed the witness and decided to blame Deivanai.

In the end, Chinna Gounder and Deivanai come out clean from the accusations made against them. Sakkara Gounder begs the villagers to forgive him, but no one listens. Chinna Gounder then forgives him for all his misdeeds by stating that he only wanted Sakkara Gounder to realise his mistakes.

== Cast ==
- Vijayakanth as Thavasi (Chinna Gounder)
- Sukanya as Deivaanai (Chinna Gounder's wife)
- Manorama as Meiyatha (Chinna Gounder's mother)
- Salim Ghouse as Sakkarai Gounder (Chinna Gounder's brother-in-law)
- Meera as Vadivu, Sakkarai Goundar's daughter
- Sathyapriya as Sundari
- Goundamani as Vellai
- Senthil as Ammavasai
- Vadivelu as Maakali, Chinna Gounder's servant
- Ra. Sankaran as Advocate Krishnamurthy
- Kovai Senthil
- Mayilsamy
- Kamala Kamesh as Ponnatha
- Devaki as Valli, Deivanai's younger sister

== Production ==
Chinna Gounder was entirely shot at Sethumadai near Pollachi. The title character was largely inspired by Udayakumar's uncle Athiyan, who served as a village chairman in the Thuckanaickenpalayam municipality for many years. To portray her character, Manorama wore dentures.

== Soundtrack ==
The music was composed by Ilaiyaraaja, while the lyrics were by R. V. Udayakumar.

Song	Singers
"Antha Vaanathai"	Ilaiyaraaja
"Chinna Kili Vanna Kili"	S. P. Balasubrahmanyam, S. Janaki
"Sutti Sutti Un Vaalai"	Malaysia Vasudevan
"Kannu Pada"	Ilaiyaraaja
"Koondukulla"	S. P. Balasubrahmanyam, S. Janaki
"Muthumani Maala"	S. P. Balasubrahmanyam, P. Susheela
"Sollaal Adicha"	Ilaiyaraaja
"Antha Vaanathai" (Female version)	S. Janaki

== Reception ==
Sundarji of Kalki called the story ordinary, but praised the cast performances and music. Chinna Gounder won the Tamil Nadu State Film Award for Best Film – Third Prize, and Sukanya won the award for Best Actress at the same ceremony. At the 13th Cinema Express Awards, she won the Cinema Express Award for Best Actress – Tamil.
