= Aalayam Productions =

Indian film production and distribution company

- Type: Film production Film distribution
- Industry: Entertainment
- Founded: 1990–2002
- Headquarters: Chennai, India
- Key people: S. Sriram; Mani Ratnam
- Products: Motion pictures (Tamil)

Aalayam Productions was an Indian film production and distribution company headed by S. Sriram. The firm had been a leading production studio in the Tamil film industry in the 1990s, with director Mani Ratnam also being a partner.

== History ==
S. Sriram and Mani Ratnam set up Aalayam Productions in 1990 and produced K. Subash's Chatriyan (1990) as their first venture. Featuring Vijayakanth and Bhanupriya in the lead roles, the film won critical acclaim and performed well at the box office.

Following the release of Roja (1992), director Mani Ratnam opted to stop making films for external production houses and chose to work solely for Aalayam Productions. The pair collaborated on Mani Ratnam's films including the heist comedy Thiruda Thiruda (1993) and the romantic drama Bombay (1995). As Bombay had faced political trouble prior to release, Sriram had said that he hoped that the film's plight and clearance would make it easier for future filmmakers to make films on religious riots without leading to controversy. Bombay went on to become one of the highest-grossing films from the Tamil industry and was also screened at many international film festivals. The studio also produced Vasanth's Aasai (1995), which gave actor Ajith Kumar his career breakthrough in the Tamil film industry.

Mani Ratnam later left the production house in the mid-1990s to prioritise work on his own studio, Madras Talkies.

Sriram died following a heart attack on 4 September 2019. Sriram was survived by his wife Nalini Sriram, a costume designer in the Indian film industry, and son, Nikhil Sriram.

== Filmography ==
Title	Year	Language	Director	Cast	Synopsis	Ref.
Chatriyan	1990	Tamil	K. Subash	Vijayakanth, Bhanupriya, Revathi	Selvam, a former police officer is pressurized by Annachi, his enemy whom he had arrested to return to the police force.	
Dasarathan	1993	Tamil	Raja Krishnamoorthy	Sarathkumar, Heera Rajagopal, Sivakumar	Dasarathan who cannot tolerate injustice becomes a cop against his father's wishes their relationship worsens when he kills an innocent man during a riot.	
Thiruda Thiruda	1993	Tamil	Mani Ratnam	Prashanth, Anand, Heera Rajagopal	Two petty thieves stumble upon a secret related to an cash container.	
Bombay	1995	Tamil	Mani Ratnam	Arvind Swamy, Manisha Koirala, Nassar	Hindu boy and Muslim girl fall in love and get married after their parents object to their relationship, later they get embroiled in Bombay riots.	
Aasai	1995	Tamil	Vasanth	Ajith Kumar, Suvaluxmi, Prakash Raj	An ex-service man who has an eye on his wife's sister kills his wife and separates her lover and tricks into marrying her.	
Samurai	2002	Tamil	Balaji Sakthivel	Vikram, Anita Hassanandani, Jaya Seal	A man along with group of people runs a rebel movement to expose corrupted politicians.	
