= Nalini Sriram =

Indian costume fashion designer and entrepreneur

- Occupations: Entrepreneur, fashion costume designer, celebrity stylist
- Known for: Fashion designing
- Spouse: S. Sriram (d.2019)

Nalini Sriram is an Indian fashion costume designer and entrepreneur. She is considered one of the early pioneers of fashion designing for South Indian films.

== Career ==
Nalini graduated with a degree in English literature and worked as a freelance writer during her early career. After marrying film producer S. Sriram, she opted to pursue a career in fashion designing and made her debut with Mani Ratnam's Roja (1992). She continued to work for Mani Ratnam's productions, and the success of her work in Bombay (1995) attracted offers from other studios. In 2000, a particular paavadai dhavani she had made for Aishwarya Rai in Kandukondain Kandukondain (2000) triggered demand for similar products in Chennai.

Nalini has regularly collaborated in films directed by Gautham Vasudev Menon since Kaakha Kaakha (2003). Notably, she won acclaim for her work in Vinnaithaandi Varuvaayaa (2010).

She has also worked in the Telugu film industry, notably designing the costumes for the cast in Gautham Menon's Ye Maaya Chesave (2010) and Vikram Kumar's Manam (2014).

Away from the film industry, Nalini co-owns the Shilpi boutique, an independent brand. She also conducts workshops and curates new collections.

== Personal life ==
Nalini was married to film producer S. Sriram, who had headed Aalayam Productions. He died of cardiac arrest in September 2019.

== Filmography ==
- 1992 Roja
- 1993 Thiruda Thiruda
- 1995 Aasai
- 1995 Bombay
- 2000 Kandukondain Kandukondain
- 2002 Gemini
- 2003 Kaakha Kaakha
- 2004 Ghilli
- 2004 Perazhagan
- 2005 Maayavi
- 2005 Ghajini
- 2006 Thirupathi
- 2006 Sillunu Oru Kaadhal
- 2006 Vettaiyaadu Vilaiyaadu
- 2007 Pokkiri
- 2007 Pachaikili Muthucharam
- 2007 Azhagiya Thamizh Magan
- 2008 Kuruvi
- 2008 Kuselan
- 2008 Satyam
- 2008 Vaaranam Aayiram
- 2009 Villu
- 2009 Ayan
- 2009 Vettaikaaran
- 2010 Asal
- 2010 Vinnaithaandi Varuvaayaa
- 2010 Ye Maaya Chesave
- 2010 Sura
- 2011 Kaavalan
- 2011 Velayudham
- 2011 Ko
- 2011 Engeyum Kaadhal
- 2011 Nadunisi Naaygal
- 2012 Ekk Deewana Tha
- 2012 Neethaane En Ponvasantham
- 2012 Yeto Vellipoyindhi Manasu
- 2014 Manam
- 2016 Remo
- 2017 Hello
