= Madras Talkies =

Indian entertainment company (founded 1995)

- Type: Private
- Industry: Entertainment
- Founded: 1995 in Chennai, Tamil Nadu
- Founders: Mani Ratnam; G. Srinivasan
- Headquarters: Chennai, India
- Key people: Mani Ratnam; Suhasini
- Products: Films
- Owner: Mani Ratnam
- Website: madrastalkies.com

Madras Talkies is an Indian entertainment company, which was established by director Mani Ratnam and his brother G. Srinivasan as partners in 1995. Madras Talkies has actively involved in production of films and television serials, which are distributed all over the world. The company has produced fifteen feature films and six television serials.

Prior to Madras Talkies, Ratnam previously served as a film producer on several projects with Aalayam Productions, alongside S. Sriram. Through his own directorial venture, Iruvar (1997), Madras Talkies made its debut as Ratnam's official production studio.

== Films ==
=== As producer ===
List of Madras Talkies film credits
Year	Title	Language	Director	Cast	Synopsis	Ref.
1997	Iruvar	Tamil	Mani Ratnam	Mohanlal, Aishwarya Rai, Prakash Raj, Tabu	A struggling actor gradually grows into the Tamil film industry's leading actor and enters politics to become Tamil Nadu's Chief Minister.	
1997	Nerukku Ner	Tamil	Vasanth	Vijay, Suriya, Kausalya, Simran	Following the break up of a passport official and his wife, their respective brothers become enemies. The pair are later forced to reconcile to save their niece, who gets kidnapped by an MLA, who wants to avenge the passport official.	
1998	Dil Se..	Hindi	Mani Ratnam	Shahrukh Khan, Manisha Koirala, Preity Zinta	Set in the backdrop of the insurgency in Northeast India, an executive of All India Radio falls in love with a mysterious woman, who turns out to be a Liberationists suicide bomber.	
2000	Alaipayuthey	Tamil	Mani Ratnam	R. Madhavan, Shalini	Karthik and Shakthi fall in love against the wishes of their parents in suburban Chennai. Following their secret marriage, the pair experience the tensions of married life and the maturing of their love.	
2001	Dumm Dumm Dumm	Tamil	Azhagam Perumal	R. Madhavan, Jyothika	An unhappy groom and bride draw up plans to stop their wedding, but they fizzle out. Just when they begin to fall in love, a real fight stops the wedding. The pair subsequently rekindle in Chennai.	
2002	Kannathil Muthamittal	Tamil	Mani Ratnam	R. Madhavan, Simran, Nandita Das, Keerthana	A child of Sri Lankan Tamil parentage, who is adopted by Indian parents, demands to return to North Sri Lanka to meet her biological mother in the midst of the Sri Lankan Civil War.	
2002	Five Star	Tamil	Susi Ganesan	Prasanna, Kanika, Krishna	Four college friends investigate the whereabouts of another friend, who was forced into a marriage by his father. After discovering that he fled from his new wife, they decide to try to find him in London.	
2002	Saathiya	Hindi	Shaad Ali	Rani Mukerji, Vivek Oberoi	Aditya and Suhani fall in love against the wishes of their parents in suburban Mumbai. Following their secret marriage, the pair experience the tensions of married life and the maturing of their love.	
2004	Aayutha Ezhuthu / Yuva	Tamil	Mani Ratnam	Suriya, R. Madhavan, Siddharth, Esha Deol, Meera Jasmine, Trisha	A goon – who dreams of making it big in life, a student leader – who strives to keep politicians away from college election and a youngster – who wants to settle abroad, have their lives change after an incident on a bridge.	
2004	Aayutha Ezhuthu / Yuva	Hindi	Mani Ratnam	Ajay Devgan, Abhishek Bachchan, Vivek Oberoi, Rani Mukherji, Kareena Kapoor, Esha Deol	A goon – who dreams of making it big in life, a student leader – who strives to keep politicians away from college election and a youngster – who wants to settle abroad, have their lives change after an incident on a bridge.	
2007	Guru	Hindi	Mani Ratnam	Abhishek Bachchan, Aishwarya Rai, R. Madhavan, Vidya Balan, Mithun Chakraborty	An ambitious man leaves his small village behind to pursue his dream of opening his own business. He gradually grows into India's largest business magnate and is faced with questions concerning the integrity of his success.	
2010	Raavan / Raavanan	Hindi	Mani Ratnam	Abhishek Bachchan, Aishwarya Rai, Vikram	A bandit leader kidnaps the wife of the policeman who killed his sister. The kidnapped woman later begins to develop feelings for her kidnapper, blurring the line of who is good and who is evil.	
2010	Raavan / Raavanan	Tamil	Mani Ratnam	Vikram, Aishwarya Rai, Prithviraj	A bandit leader kidnaps the wife of the policeman who killed his sister. The kidnapped woman later begins to develop feelings for her kidnapper, blurring the line of who is good and who is evil.	
2013	Kadal	Tamil	Mani Ratnam	Gautham Karthik, Thulasi Nair, Arjun, Arvind Swamy	A wayward youth believes that bad will triumph over good. He implicates his classmate, who is good hearted and god fearing, into a case of adultery and murder after several years. The pair consequently influence the life of a young fisherman.	
2015	O Kadhal Kanmani	Tamil	Mani Ratnam	Dulquer Salmaan, Nithya Menen, Prakash Raj, Leela Samson	Aditya and Tara opt to briefly have a live-in relationship, before they go their separate ways for their respective careers. The pair's reflection on the idea of marriage gets gradually influenced by the intimacy of their elderly landlords.	
2017	Ok Jaanu	Hindi	Shaad Ali	Aditya Roy Kapur, Shraddha Kapoor, Naseeruddin Shah, Leela Samson	Aditya and Tara opt to briefly have a live-in relationship, before they go their separate ways for their respective careers. The pair's reflection on the idea of marriage gets gradually influenced by the intimacy of their elderly landlords.	
2017	Kaatru Veliyidai	Tamil	Mani Ratnam	Karthi, Aditi Rao Hydari	A military pilot, being held as a prisoner of war in Pakistan, remembers his intense romance with a local doctor.	
2018	Chekka Chivantha Vaanam	Tamil	Mani Ratnam	Arvind Swami, STR, Vijay Sethupathi, Arun Vijay, Jyothika, Aditi Rao Hydari	A family of gangsters go through a power struggle as they attempt to find the assassin who killed their father.	
2020	Vaanam Kottatum	Tamil	Dhana Sekhar	Sarathkumar, Radhika, Vikram Prabhu, Aishwarya Rajesh, Shanthanu Bhagyaraj, Madonna Sebastian	A man's relationship with his wife and kids is jeopardised by a revelation from his past.	
2020	Putham Pudhu Kaalai	Tamil	Various	Various	OTT film	
2022	Ponniyin Selvan: I	Tamil	Mani Ratnam	Vikram, Karthi, Aishwarya Rai Bachchan, Jayam Ravi, Trisha, Aishwarya Lekshmi	Based on the epic 5 part novel by Kalki Krishnamurthy, the crown prince of the powerful Chola Empire battles enemy kingdoms with the aid of his shrewd siblings while regional chieftains and disgruntled members of royalty conspire to usurp the throne by overthrowing the ailing emperor, whose past secrets are about to change the realm's present and future.	
2023	Ponniyin Selvan: II	Tamil	Mani Ratnam	Vikram, Karthi, Aishwarya Rai Bachchan, Jayam Ravi, Trisha	The conclusion to the saga as foes turn friends and allies become adversaries in 10th century South India. In the aftermath of wars, political gamesmanship and covert regal intrigue, one man will rise above all to become a legend among kings, flying the flag of his forefathers to lands beyond and establishing a legacy that will stand the test of time.	
2025	Thug Life	Tamil	Mani Ratnam	Kamal Haasan, Silambarasan, Trisha, Abhirami	co-produced with Raaj Kamal Films International	
2027	Inji Vellam	Tamil	Mani Ratnam	Vijay Sethupathi, Sai Pallavi	co-produced with Lyca Productions	

Key
†	Denotes films that have not yet been released

=== As presenter ===
- Paradise (2023) (Malayalam)

== Web series ==
Key
†	Denotes series that have not yet been released

List of series produced by Madras Talkies
Title	Year	Director	Cast	Language	OTT	Ref.
Navarasa	2021	Arvind Swami, Bejoy Nambiar, Gautham Vasudev Menon, Halitha Shameem, K. V. Anand, Karthick Naren, Karthik Subbaraj, Ponram, Rathindran R. Prasad	Suriya, Siddharth, Parvathy Thiruvothu, Pavel Navageethan, Rajesh Balachandran, Sree Raam, Ammu Abhirami, Vijay Sethupathi, Prakash Raj, Revathi, Vikranth, Aishwarya Rajesh, Arvind Swami, Prasanna, Sai Siddharth, Shamna Kasim, Bobby Simha, Sananth, Gautham Karthik, Saravanan, Robo Shankar, Azhagam Perumal, Nithya Menen, Riythvika, Ashok Selvan, Ramesh Thilak, Vidhu	Tamil	Netflix	

== Television serials ==
List of Madras Talkies television serials
Serial	Director	No. of episodes	Channel	Frequency	Ref.
Ganesh & Vasanth	Suhasini, V. Priya	43	Sun TV	Weekly	
Panchavarnam	Manobala	39	Sun TV	Weekly	
Anbulla Snegidheiye	V. Priya	127	Sun TV	Daily	
Punnagai	Manobala	30	Sun TV	Daily	

== See also ==
- Mani Ratnam – Indian filmmaker (born 1956)
- Cinema of Tamil Nadu – Segment of Indian cinema
