= Moondru Per Moondru Kadal =

2013 Indian film by Vasanth

- Theatrical release poster
- Directed by: Vasanth
- Screenplay by: Shankar Raman; Vasanth
- Story by: Vasanth
- Produced by: Bharath Kumar; Mahendhiran; Maha Ajay Prasath
- Starring: Arjun; Cheran; Vimal; Surveen Chawla; Muktha; Lasini
- Cinematography: Bhojan K. Dinesh
- Edited by: S. N. Fazil; Vasanth
- Music by: Yuvan Shankar Raja
- Production company: Mahendra Talkies
- Release date: 1 May 2013
- Country: India
- Language: Tamil

Moondru Per Moondru Kadal (pronounced [muːnd̺ʳʉ peːr muːnd̺ʳʉ kɑːd̪əl] transl. Three People, Three Loves) is a 2013 Indian Tamil-language romance film directed, co-edited and co-written by Vasanth. It stars Arjun, Cheran, Vimal, Surveen Chawla, Muktha and Lasini. The film features music composed by Yuvan Shankar Raja. Cinematography and editing were handled by Bhojan K. Dinesh and S. N. Fazil respectively. The film revolves around three couples and the trials and tribulations they face. It was released on 1 May 2013 to mixed reviews.

== Plot ==
Varun and Anjana's love story happens in the Ooty mountains (in Tamil literature, they are referred to as Kurinji); Guna's story happens in Tuticorin seashore (Neidhal); and Harris and Divya's story happens in the city (Marudham).

Varun explains his life story: he fell in love with Anjana despite knowing her engagement had been called off, but he later sacrifices his love after hearing Guna and Mallika's story.

Guna is a philanthropist who runs an organisation called "Punnagai," a rehabilitation centre for jail prisoners. Mallika, a physiotherapist, silently pines for him. When Guna fails to reunite a prisoner, Ilankumaran, with his family, Mallika does so. Impressed with her, he gives her the responsibility of taking care of Punnagai and leaves the town.

Another story is of Harris, a swimming coach, and his student-come-lover Divya (Varun claims Divya is his childhood friend, but there is no scene where they are together). Divya is disappointed to lose the swimming match, and her father Thiruvengadam advises another coach, Elango, to replace Harris, but Divya is adamant that Harris should be her coach. Meanwhile, Harris is involved in a bike accident where his legs and hands are hurt, but he encourages Divya to participate in the Olympics swimming match. Divya rigorously practices for the match and wins by finishing it in less than 56 seconds.

In 2016, Varun narrated these stories because they prompted him to write a novel called "Moondru Kaadhal". Harris arrives at the press conference for the book release and says he is alive because of Divya. She is the epitome of goodness and confidence, and he narrates that though she had won the match, she died due to a heart attack in the swimming pool. The film ends with Harris saying that love is not to be asked but to be given.

== Cast ==
- Arjun as Paul Harris Rosario
- Cheran as Gunasekar
- Vimal as Varun
- Surveen Chawla as Divya ( Voice dubbed by Savitha Reddy )
- Muktha as Mallika ( Voice dubbed by Renuka Kathir )
- Lasini as Anjana ( Voice dubbed by Krithika Nelson)
- Sathyan as Varun's friend
- Appukutty as Karunamurthy
- Thambi Ramaiah as Thiruvengadam
- John Vijay as Elango
- Shanthi Williams as Guna's mother
- Ravi Raghavendra as Varun's father
- Aadukalam Naren as Ilankumaran
- Bosskey as Interviewer
- Boys Rajan as Doctor
- Nellai Siva
- Suruli Manohar
- Pasanga Sivakumar
- Rindhu Ravi
- Theni Murugan
- Ritvik Varun in a special appearance
- Robert in a special appearance
- Blaaze in a special appearance

== Production ==
=== Development ===
In July 2011, reports confirmed that Vasanth would start directing his next film, titled Moondru Per Moondru Kaadhal, four years after his last film Satham Podathey was released. Vasanth reportedly had been waiting with the script for three years to "get the right actors". He further noted that the film was not a love story but a "story about love". The film would consist of three love stories featuring the three lead characters, which play out in three landscapes: by the seaside, in the mountains and on the plains. Bharath Kumar, a fan of Vasanth's films, came forward to produce the film along with his friends under his newly launched Mahendra Talkies banner. Moondru Per Moondru Kaadhal was started on 9 August 2011.

=== Casting ===
The director hired Arjun, who had worked with him in Rhythm (2000), and director-turned-actor Cheran for the lead roles, while stating that four newcomers would be selected for another male lead and the three lead female roles. By November 2011, it was speculated that Vasanth would introduce his son to play the third lead role. In January 2012, Vasanth confirmed that Vimal had been finalised. Muktha Bhanu, formerly credited as Bhanu, was chosen to portray one of the female leads, while Lasini, a Kingfisher Calendar Model Hunt model from Mumbai and participant of I AM She 2010 beauty pageant, and Punjabi actress Surveen Chawla agreed to play the other two female leads, making their Tamil film debut. Furthermore, National Film Award winning actors Thambi Ramaiah and Appukutty were selected for supporting roles, providing comic relief. Despite knowing Tamil, Lasini, a native of Palakkad, had to train to improve her Tamil accent. Chawla, despite already knowing how to swim, took additional training to prepare for her role and Bhanu took help from one of Vasanth's associates to speak her dialogues in Nagercoil slang.

=== Filming ===
Filming began in late 2011, and was completed by late 2012. The film was shot in locations including Kerala, Nagercoil, Ooty, and Hyderabad.

== Soundtrack ==
The music was composed by Yuvan Shankar Raja, collaborating with Vasanth after Poovellam Kettuppar (1999) and Satham Podathey (2007). Vasanth noted that Yuvan had put in about seven months of work for this film, while describing the genre of the soundtrack as postmodern music. The soundtrack album features six songs with lyrics penned by Na. Muthukumar.

Composing was started even before the film was launched, with the first song being recorded on 9 August 2011. Sonu Nigam originally sang the melody titled "Mazhai Mazhai Mazhaiyo Mazhai", which was recorded in Mumbai. The final version, however, featured Karthik's vocals. Neha Bhasin, who had sung "Pesugiren" in Satham Podathey, lent her voice for the song "Kaadhal Endhan Kaadhal". The song "Padapadakkudhu Maname" was sung by Blaaze and Krish; the former wrote the rap lyrics.

Nandini Srikar was chosen to sing "Aaha Kadhal" after Vasanth was impressed with her song "Bhare Naina" in Ra.One (2011). The song was recorded in Mumbai. Ramesh Vinayakam, who previously worked as a composer in Vasanth's Yai! Nee Romba Azhaga Irukey! (2002), sang a peppy number titled "Stop the Paatu". Yuvan himself sang "Unakkagave", which Vasanth claimed was the first dubstep track in Tamil cinema. The final mixing was done by Kausikan Sivalingam in Berlin.

The album was launched on 1 December 2012 at the Park Sheraton Hotel in Chennai. The event was hosted by television anchors Ma Ka Pa Anand and Dhivyadharshini.

Karthik of Milliblog and Indo-Asian News Service gave the album positive reviews.

Track listing
No.	Title	Singer(s)	Length
1.	"Kaadhal Endhan Kaadhal"	Neha Bhasin	5:02
2.	"Unakkaagave Uyir Vaazhgiren"	Yuvan Shankar Raja	4:37
3.	"Padapadakkudhu Maname"	Krish, Blaaze	5:46
4.	"Aaha Kaadhal Konji Pesudhe"	Nandini Srikar	4:08
5.	"Mazhai Mazhai"	Karthik, Shweta Mohan	5:55
6.	"Stop The Paatu"	Ramesh Vinayakam	4:20
Total length:			29:48

== Release and reception ==
Moondru Per Moondru Kadhal was released on 1 May 2013 (May Day), and received mixed reviews from critics. S Saraswathi from Rediff.com gave 2.5 stars out of 5 and wrote "Moondru Per Moondru Kadhal lacks the intensity expected of a Vasanth film, but makes up for it with its exceptional music. Sify said, "MPMK is technically chic and Vasanth has made an interesting film which has its shares of romantic break-up's and heart breaks" and rated the film as average. Vivek Ramz of In.com rated the film 2.5 out of 5 and wrote "MPMK is not entirely bad and those who love pure romantic flicks can watch it once provided if you can sit through the bland first hour of the film." Baradwaj Rangan wrote for The Hindu that "the film isn't worked out very well. It doesn't build the way it ought to, and the various strands don't come together satisfactorily – they hang loose". In response to criticism over its pacing, the two hours and thirty minutes long film was shortened by 16 minutes.
