= Annupamaa =

Indian playback singer from Tamil Nadu

- Born: Annupamaa Krishnaswami; 2 September 1968; Chennai, Tamil Nadu, India
- Occupations: Playback singer, actor, voice actor Music composer
- Instruments: piano, guitar, ukulele
- Years active: 1991–present

Annupamaa is an Indian playback singer from Tamil Nadu. She is known especially for the song "Chandralekha" (Konjam Nilavu) from Thiruda Thiruda. She is also trained in Carnatic music and a 6th grade solo pianist from Trinity College London.

Annupamaa Krishnaswami was born in Chennai, Tamil Nadu, India on 2 September 1968. She got training in Carnatic music from the age of four and she began singing in school competitions from the age of eight. She had her school education from St. Anthony's Senior Secondary School, New Delhi and took her BA Degree in English from Kamala Nehru College, New Delhi in 1989. She dropped out of the Mass Communication Course from the Indian Institute of Mass Communication in New Delhi following her passion to become a singer.

Annupamaa is married to J. Murali Krishnan, Executive Vice-president and National Creative Director of Optima Response and they live in Chennai.

Annupamaa used to take part in college competitions during her days as a student of Mass Communications. As a copy trainee in an ad agency, she had a chance to participate in an Ad Utsav.

== Notable songs ==
| Song | Album | Composer |
|---|---|---|
| Akhila Akhila | Nerukku Ner | Deva |
| Anbal Unnai | 3 Roses | Karthik Raja |
| Antha Vennila | Sandhippoma | Vidyasagar |
| Break the Rules | Boys | A. R. Rahman |
| Kya Scene Hai | Sisindri | Raj |
| Chandralekha | Thiruda Thiruda / Chor Chor | A. R. Rahman |
| Chinna Ponnu | Kashmir | Deva |
| Dil Se Re | Dil Se.. | A. R. Rahman |
| Dus (female) | Dus (Unreleased) | Shankar–Ehsaan–Loy |
| Gulmohar Malare | Majunu | Harris Jeyaraj |
| Hay Hay Ye Mazboori | Haz Aur Shahadat (album) | Khurshid Alam Qawwal |
| Hello Doctor | Kadhal Desam | A. R. Rahman |
| Hosima | Chocolate | Deva |
| Ichankaatule Muyal Onnu | V.I.P | Ranjit Barot |
| Ied Ka Din | Haz Aur Shahadat (album) | Khurshid Alam Qawwal |
| If you wanna | New | A. R. Rahman |
| Indiran Alle | V.I.P | Ranjit Barot |
| I Wanna Be Free | Tehzeeb | A. R. Rahman |
| Iyaiyo Kanava | Rangeela (Tamil Dubbed version) | A. R. Rahman |
| Jaan Tum Ho Meri | Vishwavidhaata | A. R. Rahman |
| July Maddham Vanthal | Pudhiya Mugam | A. R. Rahman |
| Kaatrodu Puyalai | Rishi | Yuvan Shankar Raja |
| Kama Kama | Enakku 20 Unakku 18 | A. R. Rahman |
| Kadhal Niagra | En Swasa Kaatre | A. R. Rahman |
| Kora Kagaaj | Shraddhanjali (album) | R.D. Burman (Original) Zubeen Garg (Cover) |
| Kumuru Kumuru | Aanai | D. Imman |
| Love Love | Ulavuthurai | Shah |
| Maara Maara | Kadhal Azhivathillai | Vijaya T. Rajendar |
| Mama Varalama | Sagiye | Pradeep Ravi |
| Mercury Pookkal | Ratchagan | A. R. Rahman |
| Mogama Thakama | Kama | |
| Nazrein Milaana Nazrein Churaana | Jaane Tu... Ya Jaane Na | A. R. Rahman |
| Pappu Can't Dance | Jaane Tu... Ya Jaane Na | A. R. Rahman |
| Pooveukenna Pootu | Bombay | A. R. Rahman |
| Rahathulla | Ghajini | Harris Jeyaraj |
| Salaam | Haz Aur Shahadat (album) | Khurshid Alam Qawwal |
| Sandhipoma | Enakku 20 Unakku 18 | A. R. Rahman |
| Sandhosha Kanneere | Uyire | A. R. Rahman |
| Sundara En Sundara | Super Police | A. R. Rahman |
| Signore Signore | Kannathil Muthamittal | A. R. Rahman |
| Teri Jawani Mast Mast | Tathastu | Vishal–Shekhar |
| Thilothamma | Kadhal Mannan | Bharadwaj |
| Thithikkara Vayasu | Thimiru | Yuvan Shankar Raja |
| Thudikindra Kadhal | Nerukku Ner | Deva |
| USA USA | Achchamundu! Achchamundu! | Karthik Raja |
| Yaa Rasool Khuda | Haz Aur Shahadat (album) | Khurshid Alam Qawwal |
| Yeh Raat | Aks | Anu Malik |
