= Appu (2000 film) =

- DVD cover
- Directed by: Vasanth
- Screenplay by: Vasanth
- Based on: Sadak by Robin Bhatt
- Produced by: Rajam Balachander; Pushpa Kandasamy
- Starring: Prashanth; Devayani; Prakash Raj
- Cinematography: P. S. Vinod; Additional cinematography: R. D. Rajasekhar
- Edited by: R. Sridhar
- Music by: Deva
- Production company: Kavithalayaa Productions
- Release date: 16 June 2000
- Running time: 132 minutes
- Country: India
- Language: Tamil

Appu is a 2000 Indian Tamil-language romantic action thriller film written and directed by Vasanth. The film stars Prashanth, Devayani and Prakash Raj. It is a remake of the Hindi film Sadak (1991). The film was released on 16 June 2000.

== Plot ==
Appu is a taxi driver in Mumbai. One day, Appu meets Seetha and develops affection instantly. Seetha is also sold by her uncle to a brothel managed by Maharani, a transgender, as he is unable to repay his debt. Appu decides to save Seetha from the brothel. Appu visits the brothel as a customer and plans to make Seetha escape from there.

A small flashback is shown where Appu had a sister Saradha who eloped with her lover a few years back. However, Saradha's lover ditched her by selling her to a brothel. Saradha tries to escape from the brothel but gets caught and commits suicide. Appu vaguely sees the brothel owner from a distance who happens to be Maharani and plans to take revenge. The film comes to the present and Appu realises that Maharani was responsible for his sister's death as well.

Appu helps Seetha escape from the brothel and Maharani's henchmen are in search of them. Slowly, love blossoms between Appu and Seetha. In the chase, Appu loses his friend Mano and his lover Pooja, as they both get killed by Maharani. Finally, Appu kills Maharani and unites with Seetha.

== Cast ==
- Prashanth as Appu
- Devayani as Seetha
- Prakash Raj as Maharani
- Vignesh as Mano
- Kaveri as Pooja
- Eashwari Rao as Saradha, Appu's sister
- Ramesh Khanna as Chidambaram
- Dhamu as Dhamu
- Vietnam Veedu Sundaram as Appu's grandfather
- Mohan Sharma as Bhai
- Hemanth Ravan as Corrupted Mumbai Police Officer
- Besant Ravi as Fighter

== Production ==
K. Balachander wanted to produce a "quickie", and when he offered Vasanth to direct a remake of the Hindi film Sadak (1991), Vasanth agreed as he could not refuse an offer from his mentor. When casting the lead actor, Vasanth intentionally chose Prashanth, who he felt was stereotyped as a "lover boy", as he wanted to experiment with his acting prowess. The film entered development in mid-1999. During production, the film was briefly titled Surya before being renamed to Appu. Devayani plays the lead actress, and her voice was dubbed by Deepa Venkat, who make her debut as a dubbing artist.

Prakash Raj played the character of a eunuch, reuniting with Vasanth after Aasai (1995). Vasanth said he considered various actors before finalising Raj because he "has got a lot of fire in him and we vibe very well too". During production, some eunuchs hailing from Thiruvannamalai threatened to initiate large scale protests and do their best to hinder shooting schedules if portions of the film were not reshot. They were upset that Raj played a "sexually handicapped" person who is the antagonist. They argued that the eunuchs are treated as socially unwanted having little social standing, and that such films would further threaten their status in the society. The song "Idam Tharuvaya" was shot in South Africa while the song "Punnagaikku" was shot at Chennakeshava Temple, Somanathapura.

== Soundtrack ==
The soundtrack was composed by Deva, all song lyrics were by Vairamuthu. The audio was launched at Kamarajar Memorial Hall. Venky of Chennai Online wrote, "Though the songs sound familiar, they are definitely worth a hear".

Song	Singer(s)	Duration
"Yeno Yeno"	Sujatha, Hariharan, Harini	06:10
"Idam Tharuvaya"	Pop Shalini, P. Unnikrishnan	05:10
"Koila Koila"	Hariharan, Anuradha Sriram	06:04
"Punnagaikku"	Sukhwinder Singh, Anupama Deshpande, S. P. B. Charan	05:40
"Vaada Vaa"	Shankar Mahadevan, P. Unnikrishnan	06:05

== Critical reception ==
Malathi Rangarajan of The Hindu wrote, "Vasanth has laid a firm foundation by choosing a solid story, though there is nothing novel about it, and the rest just falls in place.Heavy at times, Appu appeals nevertheless". Rajitha of Rediff.com wrote, "It is not as though there were glaring deficiencies in this remake of the Sanjay Dutt-starrer Sadak -- the disappointment comes from the fact that the Tamil remake, with Prashant and Devyani in the lead, simply fails to grip". She added that one could expect more from Vasanth, but praised the music and Prakash Raj's acting. Krishna Chidambaram of Kalki praised the acting of Prashanth and Prakash Raj and Ramesh Khanna's humour but felt the revenge in second half could have been forceful if Prashanth got to know the culprit in the first half.

Malini Mannath of Chennai Online wrote, "A sensitive director of Vasanth's caliber is clearly wasted here. But he does leave a mark in his song picturisations (Va da va...), which are catchy, despite the absence of expensive props and sets. Cinematographer Vinod leaves a mark in his maiden effort". Indiainfo wrote, "Remake films do not always stand up to the originals. There are rare exceptions though. Appu falls into that category." The critic added that Vasanth "has done a good remake job of Sadak in Tamil. The lead stars Prasanth and Devyani have also managed to put in a performance that matches up to the original. However, the credit goes to Prakashraj who could live up to the expectations his role raised. [...] The native touch that he has given to the eunuch character is commendable".
