= Nerrukku Ner =

1997 film directed by Vasanth

- Poster
- Directed by: Vasanth
- Written by: Vasanth
- Produced by: Mani Ratnam
- Starring: Vijay; Suriya; Simran; Kausalya
- Cinematography: K. V. Anand
- Edited by: B. Lenin; V. T. Vijayan
- Music by: Deva
- Production company: Madras Talkies
- Release date: 6 September 1997
- Running time: 151 minutes
- Country: India
- Language: Tamil

Nerrukku Ner (/neɪrʊkkʊ neɪr/ transl. Face to Face) is a 1997 Indian Tamil-language romantic action film written and directed by Vasanth and produced by Mani Ratnam. The film stars Vijay and Suriya in the lead roles alongside Simran and Kausalya. Raghuvaran, Shanthi Krishna, Baby Jennifer, Karan, Vivek, Manivannan and Prakash Raj play supporting roles. The film marks Suriya's acting debut. Deva and K. V. Anand handled the music and cinematography respectively.

Nerrukku Ner released on 6 September 1997. It became a commercial success and won two Tamil Nadu State Film Awards.

== Plot ==
Raghu, a passport-issuing officer, lives in Chennai with his wife Shanthi. Raghu, a cheater with remorse, tells Shanthi that he cheated on her with a coworker when he was in Goa. She immediately leaves for her mother's house. Raghu, now a transformed gentleman, tries to stop her by apologizing, but in vain. Raghu's brother Vijay, a good and supportive brother, and Shanthi's brother Suriya, a non-emotive but supportive brother, meet in a cinema theatre. Vijay blames Shanthi for the problem, and Suriya blames Raghu for the same. They keep on fighting at every chance. Meanwhile, Vijay and Suriya fall in love with Akhila and Asha, respectively.

One day, Raghu finds a bundle of cash on his table and meets Muthukumaraswamy, the person who kept it there. Raghu realizes that Muthukumaraswamy is a businessman who is wanted by the police for forex fraud. Muthukumaraswamy wants to leave the country to escape the police. He needs a fake passport to flee the country; otherwise, the police will catch him. Since the police confiscated his passport, he tells Raghu to get one for him, but Raghu, being a sincere officer, disagrees and calls the police instead. Muthukumaraswamy gets angry and promises to take revenge on Raghu. Meanwhile, Raghu and Shanthi apply for a divorce according to the Hindu Law of Divorce. Child custody of their daughter Sona, who was at Shanthi's sister's house when the breakup occurred, is given to the mother by the court.

One day, Suriya takes Sona to a festival fair and somehow loses her. In the confusion that follows, Sona falls from a Ferris wheel and is taken to the hospital by Vijay. She is brought to Raghu's house once she recovers. Soon, Vijay discovers that Sona has lost her hearing in the accident. Some days later, Suriya finds that Sona is missing. Suriya finds Vijay, and the two get into a fight. Then, Raghu tells everyone that Sona is in his sister's house. Since Sona's custody is given to the mother, Raghu's action is wrong in the eyes of the law.

Shanthi and Suriya, accompanied by a lawyer, come to Raghu's house to get Sona back. At that time, Raghu suffers a serious asthma attack while in the bathroom, and everyone saves him. After recovering, Raghu tells everyone that Sona is not in his sister's house but has been kidnapped by Muthukumaraswamy, who is out on bail. In a turn of events, Raghu issues a fake passport to Muthukumaraswamy but does not want him to escape from the police. Vijay and Suriya join hands to ensure this does not happen. Sona is in a van with Muthukumaraswamy's wife Maya and brother-in-law Kachiram. Vijay and Suriya search for Sona, then realize she is in a van. Sona, after seeing both Vijay and Suriya on a bike, throws her family photo from the van. The van reaches the safe place, and Kachiram calls Muthukumaraswamy to share the news of their arrival. They both decide to insert a bomb in Sona's hearing device. Maya then decides to save the child. Kachiram fights her, puts her in the van, and activates the bomb, which will explode in 10 minutes. Then, Vijay and Suriya catch the van, and a fight between Kachiram and Vijay ensues.

Meanwhile, Suriya takes Sona home along with her hearing device, which still has the bomb. In the middle of the fight, Kachiram drives away. Maya shouts to Vijay to save Sona by telling him about the bomb. At the airport, Kanthaswamy, the DCP of Chennai, arrests Muthukumaraswamy. As Suriya reaches home, Vijay follows them. Once Vijay reaches home, he throws away Sona's hearing device before the bomb goes off. The film ends with Vijay and Suriya becoming best friends again after a long time and reconciling with their lady loves, and Raghu and Shanthi also embracing each other with Sona.

== Cast ==
- Vijay as Vijay
- Suriya as Suriya
- Simran as Asha (Voice dubbed by Sreeja Ravi)
- Kausalya as Akhila (Voice dubbed by Savitha Reddy)
- Raghuvaran as Raghu
- Shanthi Krishna as Shanthi
- Baby Jennifer as Sona
- Karan as Muthukumaraswamy
- Vivek as Ravi
- Manivannan as Sundaram
- Prakash Raj as DCP Kandaswamy
- Dhamu as Dhamu
- Ajay Rathnam as Kachiram
- Rajesh as Thamizharasan
- Vijayachandrika as Devaki, Suriya's mother
- Geetha Ravishankar as Sharadha, Suriya and Shanthi's elder sister
- Thalaivasal Vijay as Police Inspector Venkatram
- Kavithalaya Krishnan as Krishnan
- Ragasudha as Maya
- Fathima Babu as Alamu
- Mohan Raman as Anantharaman
- Mayilsamy as Petty Shop Owner
- Madhan Bob as Ganeshan
- Karate Raja as Suriya's friend
- Nesan as Vijay's friend
- Lakshmi Devi as Pritha
- Harish Siva
- Janaki Ravi
- Japan Kumar (special appearance in the song "Thudikindra Kadhal")

== Production ==
Initially, Vasanth chose his lead hero from Aasai, Ajith Kumar and Vijay to play the lead roles, though Ajith withdrew from the film 18 days after production began as a result of issues with director Vasanth on not revealing the story to the actor as it involves dual hero subject. The film was briefly reported to be titled Manasukkul Varalaama? (Can I Come into your Heart?) and also featured Swathi in the cast. Prabhu Deva was touted as a potential replacement to Ajith, though Vasanth then opted to replace Ajith with a debutant as he was able to commit under short notice. Vasanth then approached Suriya, the eldest son of actor Sivakumar, to make his acting debut in the film. Vasanth had earlier unsuccessfully tried to persuade Suriya to star in Aasai, in 1995 but Sivakumar insisted that his son was finally ready to act. Suriya said he was initially uninterested in an acting career, and accepted the role to pay off his mother's loan of ₹25,000 (equivalent to ₹140,000 or US$1,400 in 2026).

During the test shoot for the film, cinematographer K. V. Anand revealed that the team were worried how Suriya was going to stand opposite Vijay and that they made him wear two inch heels and made him put some shoulder pads. He added that for the first four days during the shoot in Kolkata, Suriya appeared to be uncomfortable in front of the camera and used to tell the team that he did not want to do the film. The film was the first Tamil project signed by Simran who was signed by Vasanth after he was impressed with her looks in Tere Mere Sapne, though Once More and VIP released earlier. Vasanth signed on Kausalya after seeing and being impressed with her picture at a jewellery shop and was unaware that she had already made her debut in the film Kaalamellam Kadhal Vaazhga. The director revealed he had great difficulty in filming the song "Engengae", as crowds in Kolkata refused to co-operate with the technical team. The filming mainly took place in and around Trivandrum and Kochi, with some minority portions being shot in Chennai. The song "Aval Varuvala" was shot at SDAT Tennis Stadium at Chennai.

== Soundtrack ==
The soundtrack was composed by Deva, with lyrics by Vairamuthu. The song "Akila Akila" is based on Bob Marley's "Buffalo Soldier", "Thudikindra Kadhal" was inspired by "Im Nin'alu" by Ofra Haza, and "Aval Varuvala" uses a minor refrain from Marley's "Get Up, Stand Up". The song was also reused in the 2026 film With Love. The song "Manam Virumbuthey" was inspired by "Manavyalakinchara" by Tyagaraja, and is set to the Carnatic raga Nalinakanthi. The song "Engenge" is set to Charukesi raga.

Track listing
No.	Title	Singer(s)	Length
1.	"Engengey"	Hariharan, Asha Bhosle	05:52
2.	"Aval Varuvala"	Hariharan, Shahul Hameed	06:08
3.	"Akila Akila"	Srinivas, Anupama	05:36
4.	"Thudikindra Kadhal (Evar Kandaar)"	Anupama, Mano, Bhavatharini	04:45
5.	"Manam Virumbuthey" (female)	Harini	06:03
6.	"Manam Virumbuthey" (male)	P. Unnikrishnan	06:03
Total length:			33:49

== Release and reception ==
Nerrukku Ner was released on 6 September 1997. R. P. R. of Kalki bemoaned that the "nalla director" (good director) Vasanth gave a garam masala by having villain, bike chase, fights, sada songs, cheesy comedy and regular climax. The film went on to win two Tamil Nadu State Film Awards for 1997 with the child artiste, Jennifer, securing the Best Child Star award for her performance. Harini also won the Best Female Playback Singer award for her rendition of "Manam Virumbuthae" in the album aged 18. The film won two Dinakaran Cinema Awards: Best New-Face Actor (Suriya) and Best Child Artist (Jennifer).
