= Dasarathan =

- Poster
- Directed by: Raja Krishnamoorthy
- Written by: Raja Krishnamoorthy
- Produced by: Mani Ratnam; S. Sriram
- Starring: Sarathkumar; Heera
- Cinematography: G. P. Krishna
- Edited by: B. Lenin; V. T. Vijayan
- Music by: L. Vaidyanathan
- Production company: Aalayam Productions
- Release date: 5 February 1993
- Running time: 146 minutes
- Country: India
- Language: Tamil

Dasarathan (/ˈðəsərəθən/) is a 1993 Indian Tamil language-language action film, directed by actor Kitty making his directorial debut credited under his real name Raja Krishnamoorthy. The film stars Sarathkumar and Heera, while Sivakumar, Saranya and Gandhimathi play supporting roles. It was released on 5 February 1993.

== Plot ==
Dasarathan wants to become a high ranking policeman and is also a hard working man who fights against bad people. But his father does not like Dasarathan fighting with people and always quarrels with him to not interfere in other people's problems. Dasarathan, while travelling in a bus, saves Heera from bad people. Heera gets a file of Dasarathan in the bus and later goes to his house to return the file. Heera finds out that she was the school time girlfriend of Dasarathan and knows his father, who used to give food to anybody who came to his house. Heera tries to learn cooking and help Dasarathan's father, but spoils the whole kitchen. Dasarathan and Heera falls in love and marry.

Meanwhile, Dasarathan gets appointed as a commissioner and tries to deal with a riot. During the riot, Dasarathan shoots at an innocent man who accidentally came in the front of the riot. The news comes in the newspapers. Dasarathan's father, after reading the news, goes to the area where the victim lived with his wife. Dasarathan's father helps the victim's wife, Sharanya and her child. Dasarathan, now staying in another house, finds his father is missing from the house. Dasarathan encounters a new politician enemy who was behind the previous riot, which made Dasarathan kill the innocent man. Dasarathan's father and Sharanya become witnesses for a policeman's death due to rowdies of the politician.

Dasarathan, investigating the policeman's death, finds out evidence to the killing of an old man and Sharanya, but does not know his father is the witness. Dasarathan enters Sharanya's house and accidentally finds out his father is living with Sharanya, and he while leaving the area, he gets attacked by rowdies of the politician. Now Dasarathan's father helps in the hospital and takes care of Dasarathan. Later all of them stay in one place. Now at night, the politician and his rowdies try to kill Dasarathan's family. During the attack, the house's electricity goes off. Dasarathan also finally enters to the house, and a fight in the darkness happens, with Sarath finally defeating the politician villain and his rowdies.

== Cast ==
- Sarathkumar as Dasarathan
- Heera
- Sivakumar as Dasarathan's father
- Saranya
- Gandhimathi
- Charle
- Ajay Rathnam

== Production ==
The film marked the directorial debut of Raja Krishnamurthy who earlier assisted Mani Ratnam. He initially planned to make this film in Malayalam with Mohanlal and Thilakan in lead roles but Santosh Sivan insisted to make this in Tamil. The film was produced by Mani Ratnam under Aalayam Productions.

== Soundtrack ==
The soundtrack was composed by L. Vaidyanathan.

Track listing
No.	Title	Lyrics	Singer(s)	Length
1.	"Araro Ariraro"	Vairamuthu	K. J. Yesudas, S. P. Balasubrahmanyam	5:00
2.	"Chinna Ponnu"	Raja Krishnamurthy	S. P. Balasubrahmanyam, Swarnalatha	6:02
3.	"Enna Than Solvathu"	Vairamuthu	Mano, Sunanda	4:37
4.	"Iyappa Iyappa"	Vairamuthu	K. J. Yesudas	6:02
5.	"Unnai Kandu"	Raja Krishnamurthy	Mano, K. S. Chithra	4:25
Total length:				26:06

== Reception ==
R. P. R. of Kalki wrote that the director seemed to have been confused whether to make his kind of a film or a Sarathkumar kind of film.
