= Pedda Manushulu (1999 film) =

- Film poster
- Directed by: Boyina Subba Rao
- Produced by: Daggubati Ramanaidu
- Starring: Suman; Rachana; Heera Rajagopal
- Music by: Eeshwar
- Production company: Suresh Productions
- Release date: 13 January 1999
- Running time: 160 minutes 18 seconds
- Country: India
- Language: Telugu

Pedda Manushulu (transl. Gentlemen) is a 1999 Telugu-language film directed by Boyina Subba Rao under the Suresh Productions banner. The film stars Suman and Rachana. The film was an adaptation of Kommanapally Ganapathy Ran’s novel, Shatadinotsavam.

== Cast ==
- Suman as Sagar
- Rachana Banerjee as Sravanthi
- Heera Rajagopal as Bhanumathi
- Kaikala Satyanarayana as Balakotayya
- Srihari
- Kota Srinivasa Rao as Chenchuramayya
- Raja Ravindra
- Narsing Yadav
- S. P. Balasubrahmanyam
- D. Ramanaidu (guest appearance)

== Soundtrack ==
Pedda Manushulu

Film score by Eeshwar
- Released: 1999
- Genre: Soundtrack
- Label: Aditya Music
- Producer: Eeshwar

Eeshwar composed the music. Music released under Aditya Music Company.

No.	Title	Singer(s)	Length
1.	"Kondapuramu"	S. P. Balasubrahmanyam, K. S. Chithra
2.	"Andagatthela"	S. P. Balasubrahmanyam
3.	"Vaana Jallu"	Mano, Sujatha
4.	"Zebra Zebra"	Mano, Swarnalatha
5.	"Patti Patti"	S. P. Balasubrahmanyam, Chithra
6.	"Vennela Tharagani"	S. P. Balasubrahmanyam, Chithra
7.	"Nannu Hathya"	S. P. Balasubrahmanyam

== Release ==
A critic from The Hindu wrote, "Suman looks too heavy to prance around with the heroines. Srihari as the bridegroom, who keeps stripping to show off his biceps frequently, is irritating. The comic track is very poor. Musical score by S A Rajkumar is deafening. On the whole a downbeat movie."
