= Satham Podathey =

- Poster
- Directed by: Vasanth
- Written by: Vasanth
- Produced by: C. Shanker; R. S. Senthil Kumar
- Starring: Prithviraj; Padmapriya; Nithin Sathya
- Cinematography: Dinesshkumaar
- Edited by: Sathisshkurosowaa
- Music by: Yuvan Shankar Raja
- Production company: Kaivallya Entertainment
- Release date: 14 September 2007
- Running time: 157 minutes
- Country: India
- Language: Tamil

Satham Podathey (transl. Don't make a sound) is a 2007 Indian Tamil-language psychological thriller film written and directed by Vasanth. It stars Prithviraj and Padmapriya, with Nithin Sathya as the main antagonist, whilst Nassar, Suhasini, Premji and Raaghav play pivotal roles. The film, which is based on a true incident, has music scored by Yuvan Shankar Raja. The film was released on 14 September 2007.

== Plot ==
Bhanumathy marries Rathnavel Kalidas, who works in railways as a hockey player. He married Bhanu by hiding the fact that he is infertile and a recovering alcoholic. Soon, the relationship turns sour when the couple realises that Rathnavel is infertile after a gynecologist tells them so. Despite family pressures to get a mutual divorce, the old-fashioned Bhanu decides to go ahead with the marriage by adopting a child.

With the baby's arrival, Rathnavel becomes more insecure and tells Bhanu that the child reminds him of his weakness. All hell breaks loose when Bhanu realises that her husband was an alcoholic who knew about his infertility and betrayed her. Rathnavel, in his anger, beats up Bhanu until she is almost unconscious. A few days later, she files for a divorce and stays with her parents for some days.

Later, Bhanu meets Ravichandran, a happy-go-lucky guy and a friend of her brother. Ravi proposes to Bhanu, and they later marry, but Rathnavel, who vowed to make Bhanu's life miserable, returns. He kidnaps Bhanu and places a cadaver in her home before faking an accident with a cooking gas cylinder, leading Ravi and his family to believe that Bhanu died in a kitchen accident. After that, Rathnavel brings Bhanu to his bungalow in an isolated area and locks her in a soundproof room. When Ravi goes to Rathnavel's house to get some life insurance papers, a series of clues leads him to find Bhanu. After distracting Rathnavel, Ravi calls the police and rescues Bhanu. Rathnavel is sent to a mental asylum, where he later hangs himself.

This seems to be a true story that happened in Andhra Pradesh in the late 1990s, and Rathnavel's (name changed) family members are still there in Kakinada. The movie ends on a happy note with Ravi and Bhanu happily married and Bhanu visibly pregnant.

== Cast ==
- Prithviraj as Ravichandran
- Padmapriya as Bhanumathy Sridharan. Voice dubbed by Chinmayi
- Nithin Sathya as Rathnavel alias Ramanathan
- Raaghav as Bhanu's brother
- Suhasini as the gynaecologist
- Nassar as Vincent Selvakumar
- Sriman as Police inspector
- Premji as Ravichandran's friend
- Jagan as Jegan, Rathnavel's friend
- M. Krishnamoorthy (Nagesh Krishnamoorthy) as Bhanu's father
- Crane Manohar as Ramachandran
- Kottachi as Cow herder
- Bayilvan Ranganathan in a deleted scene
- Soundarya as Ramachandran's wife

Uncredited

- Nellai Siva as Roadside shop owner
- Muthalvan Saran as Marriage registration officer

== Production ==
When Vasanth met doctor Priya Kannan, she spoke about a deceased man suffering from impotency who tortured his wife and while attending as guest for Alcohol Anonymous centre, he was deeply moved by the people who spoke about alcoholism affecting their life. He made a screenplay out of these two incidents.

== Soundtrack ==
Director Vasanth teamed up with composer Yuvan Shankar Raja again for Satham Podathey after Poovellam Kettuppar (1999). The soundtrack album was released on 14 June 2007 at the Kamarajar Arangam.

Saraswathy Srinivas of Rediff.com gave the album a positive review, praising Yuvan's work. He was, in particular, lauded for making singers Shankar Mahadevan, Shreya Ghoshal and classical singer Sudha Ragunathan render songs in different genres as they earlier never did, whereas Sudha's rendition of a hip hop song called "Kadhal Periyadha" was seen as a "surprise item". "Pesugiren Pesugiren" and "O Indha Kaadhal" topped the charts for some time.

All lyrics are written by Na. Muthukumar.

Track listing
No.	Title	Singer(s)	Length
1.	"Azhagu Kutti Chellam"	Shankar Mahadevan	5:48
2.	"O Indha Kaadhal"	Adnan Sami, Raju Krishnamurthy, Yuvan Shankar Raja	5:30
3.	"Pesugiren Pesugiren"	Neha Bhasin (credited as "Viva Girls")	5:30
4.	"Entha Kuthiraiyil"	Shreya Ghoshal, Rahul Nambiar	6:20
5.	"Kadhal Periyadha"	Sudha Ragunathan	5:28
Total length:			28:36

== Reception ==
Nandhu Sundaram wrote for Rediff.com, "Surprisingly, hits are hard to come by in the thriller movie genre in Tamil, so, any noteworthy attempt deserves to be appreciated. SM Vasanth's Satham Podathey is one such attempt". Arundhati of Kalki praised the performances of the star cast, music, cinematography while also praising Vasanth for giving a family thriller and for portraying impotence with sensitivity. Malini Mannath of Chennai Online wrote, "It's a commendable effort from Vasanth to give a psychological thriller. If only he had taken a little more care in the etching of his antagonist, and in structuring the later half of the film".

== Accolades ==
Vasanth won the Tamil Nadu State Film Award for Best Story Writer, and Neha Bhasin won the Reliance Mobile Vijay TV Award for Best Female Playback Singer for "Pesugiren Pesugiren".
