= Heera Rajagopal =

Indian actress (born 1971)

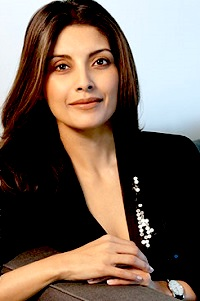
- Born: Heera Rajagopal; Chennai, Tamil Nadu, India
- Education: Women's Christian College, Chennai (B.Sc.)
- Occupations: Actress, Philanthropist
- Years active: 1991–1999
- Spouse: Pushkar Madhav Natu (m. 2002; div. 2006)

Heera Rajagopal is an Indian former actress who has appeared in a number of Tamil, Telugu, Kannada, Malayalam and Hindi language films.

== Early life and family ==
Heera Rajagopal was born to Colonel Dr. Rajagopal and his wife. Her father was a doctor in the Army Medical Corps of the Indian Army. After retiring from the army, he worked as a dermatologist at the Apollo Hospital in Chennai. Her mother was a nurse in the Military Nursing Service of the Indian Army. She has a younger sister named Sangeetha. Heera married Pushkar Madhav Natu in 2002 and divorced him in 2006.

== Career ==
As a military brat, Heera shifted to schools across different states in India every few years. She later pursued a degree in psychology at Women's Christian College, Chennai. During her time in college, Heera was approached to model for print magazines, and she took on the opportunities for financial independence. She also briefly worked as an encyclopedia-seller, a hotel worker, and a model coordinator in her days as a student. Heera was initially not keen on a career in films and turned down initial approaches for roles by film directors. She first received a film offer on a family holiday at Gulmarg in Kashmir, where a producer had approached her to play the body double for Tina Munim. She also later rejected an offer from filmmaker Subhash Ghai, who had attended one of her modeling assignments.

In 1991, soon after finishing college, Heera accepted to play the lead female role in Kathir's Tamil romantic drama film Idhayam. Despite her initial apprehensions, she was convinced by film producer T. G. Thyagarajan to become an actress, and she obliged, crediting the professional approach and continued determination of the film's team to sign her on. Heera's second film Nee Pathi Naan Pathi (1991), was directed by Vasanth and produced by Kavithalayaa Productions. She then starred in four films opposite actor Sarathkumar in quick succession, before playing a single mother in Sabash Babu (1993), written by T. Rajender.

Heera was cast by Mani Ratnam in his caper film Thiruda Thiruda (1993), and portrayed a rural belle who becomes a thief on the run, alongside actors Prashanth and Anand. A critic from The New Indian Express wrote there was "a drastic change of image from her hitherto sophisticated roles" and that she enacts it "so successfully". She later debuted in Bollywood through Raj Sippy's Amaanat (1994) co-starring Sanjay Dutt and Akshay Kumar. The film had a delayed release, after being impacted by Dutt's criminal litigation process.

In the mid-1990s, Heera continued to act in high-profile Tamil productions, though often as one of several female lead actresses. She notably appeared in Balu Mahendra's comedy drama Sathi Leelavathi (1995), alongside an ensemble cast including Kamal Haasan, Ramesh Aravind and Raja. She portrayed a corporate manager in Agathiyan's Kadhal Kottai (1996), co-starring Ajith Kumar and Devayani. The film performed well at the box office, and went on to win several National Film Awards. She later featured in a supporting role opposite Kamal Haasan in K. S. Ravikumar's comedy drama Avvai Shanmugi (1996).

Heera opted to quit the film industry in late 1999 citing she did not want to "succumb to the inevitable pressures" to play roles that did not appeal to her intellect sensibilities.

== Filmography ==
Year	Film	Role	Language	Notes
1984	Aparadhi		Telugu	
1986	Poojaku Panikiraani Puvvu		Telugu	
1991	Idhayam	Geetha	Tamil	
1991	Nee Pathi Naan Pathi	Madhu	Tamil	
1992	Public Rowdy		Telugu	
1992	Endrum Anbudan	Kamali	Tamil	
1993	Dasarathan		Tamil	
1993	Munarivippu	Padma	Tamil	
1993	Band Master	Gita	Tamil	
1993	Sabash Babu	Lalitha	Tamil	
1993	Thiruda Thiruda	Rajathi	Tamil	
1993	Apoorva Jodi		Kannada	
1994	Namma Annachi	Priya	Tamil	
1994	Thaatboot Thanjavoor		Tamil	
1994	Dongala Rajyam		Telugu	
1994	Amaanat	Gita	Hindi	
1994	The Gentleman		Hindi	
1995	Sathi Leelavathi	Priyadharshini “Priya”	Tamil	
1995	Nirnayam	Annie	Malayalam	
1995	Minnaminuginum Minnukettu	Pinky Menon	Malayalam	
1995	Oru Abhibhashakante Case Diary	Indu	Malayalam	
1996	Little Soldiers	Anitha	Telugu	
1996	Sri Karam		Telugu	
1996	Krishna	Tara	Tamil	
1996	Kadhal Kottai	Neha	Tamil	
1996	Mr. Bechara	Asha Varma	Hindi	
1996	Aur Ek Prem Kahani	Kokila	Hindi	
1996	Avvai Shanmugi	Ratna	Tamil	
1997	Aahvaanam	Sireesha	Telugu	
1997	Kalavida	Prema	Kannada	
1997	Chelikadu		Telugu	
1998	Aavida Maa Aavide	Jhansi	Telugu	
1998	Sundara Pandian	Ramya	Tamil	
1998	Poothiruvathira Raavil	Aswathy	Malayalam	
1998	Yaare Neenu Cheluve	Diana	Kannada	
1998	Padutha Theeyaga	Uma	Telugu	
1998	Anthahpuram	Dancer	Telugu	Special appearance in the song "Chamakku Chamakkule"
1998	Yuvaratna Rana		Telugu	
1998	Pooveli	Shalini	Tamil	
1999	Thodarum	Meera	Tamil	
1999	Peddamanushulu	Bhanumathi	Telugu	
1999	Alludugaaru Vachcharu	Shalini	Telugu	
1999	Suyamvaram	Maheshwari	Tamil	

=== Television ===
Year	Title	Role	Director	Language	Ref.
1995	Chinna Chinna Aasai – Aarambam	Supriya	Herself	Tamil	
