= Samurai (2002 film) =

2002 film by Balaji Sakthivel

- Promotional poster
- Directed by: Balaji Sakthivel
- Written by: Balaji Sakthivel
- Produced by: S. Sriram
- Starring: Vikram; Anita Hassanandani; Jaya Seal
- Cinematography: Sethu Sriram
- Edited by: V. T. Vijayan
- Music by: Harris Jayaraj
- Production company: Aalayam Productions
- Release date: 12 July 2002 (India)
- Running time: 180 minutes
- Country: India
- Language: Tamil

Samurai is a 2002 Indian Tamil-language vigilante action thriller film written and directed by Balaji Sakthivel (in his directoral debut) and produced by S. Sriram. The film stars Vikram in the title role, alongside Anita Hassanandani, Jaya Seal, and Nassar. Cinematography was handled by Sethu Sriram and the music was scored by Harris Jayaraj.

Filming of Samurai started in March 2001 but due to the production delays, the film was released in July 2002.

== Plot ==
Thiyagarajan, a medical student, heads to meet his childhood friend Varadharajan. On the way, he meets a kind-hearted but mischievous schoolgirl Deiva, who lives with her grandmother and is the daughter of a police officer named Sandana Pandian. Sandana has a run-in with Thiyagu, but later realizes his kind-heartedness. Thiyagu meets up with his friends to kidnap a politician for his illegal activities at which time, he finds out that Sandana's family are neighbors with him and good friends with his friend. After the dirty politician gets kidnapped, Sandana is appointed to investigate the case.

Meanwhile, Thiyagu also kidnaps another five people, while Sandana is unable to catch the culprit. During this time, Nisha's friends try to molest Deiva. Unable to bear the trauma she experienced on her own, she returns to her parents. However, Sandana is already stressed out from the investigation and doesn't want to hear about Deiva's problems. Thiyagu helps to relieve Deiva's anxiety by telling her she now knows how to avoid that type of situation in the future. After that, Deiva, not knowing Thiyagu's true identity, falls in love with him.

Past: Thiyagu's studious classmate, Kavitha writes about the things, which she wants to tell Thiyagu in her diary, but never does. Although Thiyagu gets irritated with her, he still loves her. While attending medical school, Kavitha discovers that a pharmaceutical company has distributed expired medicines that caused a boy's death. When she tries to expose the company, no one supports her because they don't know the boy. This upset her so much she commits suicide. Before dying though, Kavitha asked Thiyagu to deliver justice for the boy's death on her behalf. After much thought, and after reading Kavitha's diary, Thiyagu and his friends decide to exact vengeance on those, who use a loophole in the law to complete their prison sentence in guest houses and hospitals.

Present: Sandana discovers that the next target is a minister, who is behind the pharma crimes for which Kavitha committed suicide. Sandana tries to protect the minister, but he still gets kidnapped, where Sandana later realizes that Thiyagu is responsible for the kidnappings. Knowing Pandian is after him, Thiyagu tries to escape. When Deiva conveys her love to Thiyagu, he reveals his identity to her. Pandian captures Thiyagu and puts him on trial in an open court with magistrates and other people. They ask him to release the kidnapped people, but Thiyagu argues that he will only release them after they are punished with a capital punishment.

The magistrates deny the request stating there is no law that has such a punishment. The abductees end up being released and everyone that heard Thiyagu's argument, form a protest and kills all the abductees. After this, Sandana takes Thiyagu and his friends away in a van, and appreciates his work by saying that there is a need for such a law that gives the culprits a punishment of death. As Thiyagu leaves, Deiva arrives, which reminds Thyagu of how he felt about Kavitha. Deiva tells him that Kavitha is always with him just as Deiva will be. Later, Thiyagu and his friends leave with Deiva.

== Cast ==
- Vikram as Thiyagarajan (Thiyagu)
- Anita Hassanandani as Deiva
- Jaya Seal as Dr.Kavitha
- Nassar as ASP Sandana Pandian IPS
- Jayakumar as Thiyagu's Friend
- Anupam Shyam as DIG Vasu Devan IPS
- Kollam Thulasi as IAS Rajeshwar
- Chinni Jayanth as Varadarajan
- Bindu Panicker as Deiva's mother
- Vadivukkarasi as Deiva's grandmother
- Delhi Kumar as Medical College Dean
- George Maryan as a villager
- Sriya Reddy as Nisha
- Piyush Mishra as Politician (special appearance)

== Production ==
Vikram signed the film in March 2001 and it became the first venture he committed to, after the blockbuster success of Bala's Sethu which released in 1999. North Indian model Anita Hassanandani was selected to make her debut in the film, but another film, Varushamellam Vasantham starring Anita Hassanandani was released before Samurai.

Simran was approached to play a pivotal role in the film, but Jaya Seel, who appeared alongside Prabhu Deva in Pennin Manathai Thottu, was roped in instead to play a medical student. Malayalam actor Kollam Thulasi was signed up to play a villain in the film making his debut in Tamil films.

Shooting commenced in April 2001 when Vikram was simultaneously shooting for the action masala films such as Vinnukkum Mannukkum (2001), Dhill (2001), Kasi (2001), Gemini (2002), King (2002) and Kadhal Sadugudu (2003), and was continued till June 2002 due to some production delays. The initial schedules were held in Chennai, then the unit moved on to shoot at locations in Kuttralam, Ooty, Araku, Vishakhapatnam, Lucknow and Bihar. Some scenes with the lead pair were shot in the forest areas of Kerala which was also the location for a song shot on Vikram. Again, a lavish set was erected at the AVM Studios where Vikram, Anita, and new-face Shreya took part. The film was also heavily shot in Orissa, while songs were canned in Syria. The song "Moongil Kaadugale" was shot at Hogenakkal Falls in Dharmapuri.

Vikram went to yoga classes to prepare for the opening scene for Samurai, where he poses in the Mayura asanam posture. In a 2002 interview, the actor stated that when he first met Balaji, "he was a very enthusiastic, charged person" and was able to convince Vikram to star in the film. He also compared Balaji with director Shankar.

== Soundtrack ==
The music and background score were composed by Harris Jayaraj.

Samurai

Soundtrack album by Harris Jayaraj
- Released: July 2, 2002
- Recorded: 2002
- Genre: Feature film soundtrack
- Length: 26:59
- Labels: Five Star Audio; Ayngaran Music; An Ak Audio
- Producer: Harris Jayaraj

Harris Jayaraj chronology
Vasu (2002)	Samurai (2002)	Lesa Lesa (2003)

All tracks are written by Vairamuthu.

Track listing
No.	Title	Singer(s)	Length
1.	"Aagaya Suriyanai"	Harish Raghavendra, Harini	5:25
2.	"En Manadhil"	Vasundhara Das	5:02
3.	"Adidadi Appatha"	Suneeta Rao, Vadivukkarasi	4:38
4.	"Moongil Kaadugale"	Hariharan, Tippu	6:20
5.	"Oru Nadhi Oru Pournami"	Nithyashree Mahadevan, Tushara	5:34
Total length:			26:59

== Reception ==
Samurai opened in July 2002. The Hindu's critic noted that "Samurai will satisfy action lovers but for those looking for innovation in story and screenplay, the soldier leaves you yearning". With respect to performances, the critic added that "with an admirably well-maintained physique and powerful eyes Vikram is all geared up for action". Moreover, "Anita is more of an essential prop, but Jayaseel in a cameo has scope to perform, which she does well".

Rediff.com wrote that "the net result is disappointing due to the worn-out theme that is very reminiscent of recent films". However, the reviewer also went on to say "Vikram, though, is convincing in his portrayal and the 'training' scenes where he gains expertise and invulnerability is thrilling and the stunt scenes draw applause".

The director himself later labelled the film a "damp squib" mentioning he made serious errors with the film's screenplay. The film ended a string of consecutive successful Vikram films in Dhill, Kasi and Gemini. Despite this, it was reported that Balaji Sakthivel was still keen to make Vikram star in his next film, though the director next went on to make the successful low-budget film Kaadhal (2004). Samurai was later dubbed under the same name in Telugu to capitalise on Vikram's star potential.
