= Chatriyan =

- Poster
- Directed by: K. Subash
- Written by: A. Varunan (dialogues)
- Screenplay by: Mani Ratnam
- Story by: Mani Ratnam
- Produced by: Mani Ratnam; S. Sriram
- Starring: Vijayakanth; Bhanupriya; Thilakan
- Cinematography: Y. N. Murali
- Edited by: Raghu; Baabu
- Music by: Ilaiyaraaja
- Production company: Aalayam Productions
- Release date: 17 October 1990
- Running time: 130 minutes
- Country: India
- Language: Tamil

Chatriyan (transl. The Warrior) is a 1990 Indian Tamil-language action drama film directed by K. Subash and written by Mani Ratnam, with dialogues by A. Varunan. The film stars Vijayakanth, Bhanupriya and Thilakan, with Revathi in a guest appearance. The music was composed by Ilaiyaraaja, while cinematography and editing were handled by Y. N. Murali and Raghu & Baabu.

Chatriyan became a blockbuster at the box office and achieved cult status.

== Plot ==
ACP Panneer Selvam alias Sathriyan, an honest cop, gathers enough evidence against a local goon named Arumai Nayagam alias Annachi for his involvement in illegal activities. Annachi is sent to prison but avenges his arrest by killing Sathriyan's wife Jaya.

Consequently, Sathriyan quits the police force and takes care of his children, while renting an apartment. Banu, the apartment owner's granddaughter, gets introduced to Sathriyan's children and starts mingling with them. She eventually falls in love with Sathriyan and learns about his tragic childhood and meeting Jaya.

Meanwhile, Annachi is released from prison and realizes that he does not carry the same respect as he used to before going to prison. His anger against Sathriyan does not cease. Annachi challenges Sathriyan to join the police and fight him again. Sathriyan initially rejects the offer. Annachi tries to provoke Sathriyan by attacking his home and son. Out of frustration over his son's attack, Sathriyan joins the police and fights Annachi, who gets defeated by Sathriyan after an intense hand-to-hand combat.

== Cast ==
- Vijayakanth as ACP Panneer Selvam alias Sathriyan
  - Master Vishnuvardhan as a young Sathriyan
- Bhanupriya as Banu
- Thilakan as Arumai Nayagam alias Annachi
- V. K. Ramasamy as Banu's grandfather and Sathriyan's house owner
- Vijayakumar as Sathriyan's godfather
- A. V. Ramanan as ASP Ramanan
- Delhi Ganesh as Jaya's father
- Ajay Rathnam as John Swaminathan
- Veeraraghavan as Dileep
- Vincent Roy as Manibharathi
- Kutty Padmini as Panneer Selvam Mother
- Baby Aarthi as Preethi
- Revathi as Jaya, Sathriyan's wife (cameo appearance)

== Production ==
Chatriyan is the first film produced by Aalayam Productions.

== Soundtrack ==
The music was scored by Ilaiyaraaja, with lyrics written by Vaali. The song "Maalayil Yaaro" is set in Suddhadhanyasi raga. The song "Pootukkal Pottalum" was inspired by "My Favorite Things" from The Sound of Music.

Track listing

Song	Singers(s)	Length
"Maalayil Yaro Manathodu"	Swarnalatha	05:31
"Yaaru Pottadhu"	S. Janaki, Yuvan Shankar Raja	04:40
"Pootukkal Pottalum"	S. Janaki	04:58

== Release and reception ==
Chathriyan was released on 17 October 1990 alongside other major releases including Michael Madana Kama Rajan, Mallu Vetti Minor, Avasara Police 100, Sirayil Sila Raagangal, En Kadhal Kanmani, Amman Kovil Thiruvizha and Pudhupaattu. C. R. K. of Kalki praised the film for crisp dialogues, subtle emotions and cinematography.

== In other media ==
The Tamil film Theri (2016) was noted for its similarities to this film.
