= Bahala Chennagide =

2001 film by M. S. Rajshekar

- Directed by: M. S. Rajashekar
- Story by: E. V. V. Satyanarayana
- Produced by: Ganapathi Prasad; S. Ramanathan; Shivaram; Chandulal Jain
- Starring: Shiva Rajkumar; Shashi Kumar; Jaya Seal
- Cinematography: Prasad Babu
- Edited by: S. Manohar
- Music by: Koti
- Production company: Chitra Jyothi
- Release date: 25 July 2001
- Running time: 123 min
- Country: India
- Language: Kannada

Bahala Chennagide (transl. Very Good) is a 2001 Indian Kannada language drama film starring Shiva Rajkumar, Shashi Kumar and Jaya Seal. The film is directed by M.S.Rajshekar. It is a remake of the Telugu language film Chala Bagundi (2000) directed by E. V. V. Satyanarayana.

== Cast ==
- Shiva Rajkumar as Krishna
- Shashi Kumar as Shivaji
- Jaya Seal as Vidya
- Ruchita Prasad
- Shivaram
- Ramesh Bhat as Seetapathi
- Ashok Badaradinni
- Shani Mahadevappa
- Jayakumar
- Padma Vasanthi as Saraswathi
- Ashwini
- Shivangi Chaudhary
- Aravind
- Honnavalli Krishna
- Dingri Nagaraj
- Rajaram as Rajaram
- Umesh Hegde
- Vijay
- Master Santhosh
- Master Chandan

== Production ==
This was the final film produced by Chandulal Jain before his death in 2009.

== Soundtrack ==
All the songs are composed and scored by Koti.

Sl No	Song title	Singer(s)	Lyrics
1	"Srikara Idu"	S. P. Balasubrahmanyam, Lata Hamsalekha	Doddarange Gowda
2	"Kanda Odane"	S. P. Balasubrahmanyam, Harini	K. Kalyan
3	"Hosa Ragadali"	S. P. Balasubrahmanyam, M. D. Pallavi Arun	Doddarange Gowda
4	"Holi Holi"	S. P. Balasubrahmanyam, K. S. Chithra	K. Kalyan
5	"Chori Chori"	Devan Ekambaram, Harini	K. Kalyan
6	"Bombatu Brotheru"	S. P. Balasubrahmanyam	Bangi Ranga

== Reception ==
Indiainfo wrote "Of course, there are the usual quota of songs, comedy and sentiments present in the film. After a long time Shivraj's performance is worth mentioning, Shashi Kumar has also done a decent job, Jay seal and Ruchita are okay. Ramesh Bhatt and Ashok Badardinni have some good comic scenes, Kalyan's songs are also okay. Overall, this Telugu remake of Chaala Baagundi is Bahala Chennagide".
