= Nee Pathi Naan Pathi =

- DVD cover
- Directed by: Vasanth
- Written by: Vasanth
- Produced by: Rajam Balachander; Pushpa Kandaswamy
- Starring: Rahman; Gautami; Heera
- Cinematography: R. Ganesh
- Edited by: Ganesh–Kumar
- Music by: Maragadha Mani
- Production company: Kavithalayaa Productions
- Release date: 12 September 1991
- Country: India
- Language: Tamil

Nee Pathi Naan Pathi (transl. You are one half, I am one half) is a 1991 Indian Tamil-language romantic drama film directed by Vasanth and produced by Kavithalayaa Productions. The film stars Rahman, Gautami and Heera. The music was composed by M. M. Keeravani under the pseudonym Maragathamani. The film's title is based on a song from the director's previous film Keladi Kannmanii (1990). It was released on 12 September 1991, and became an average success, but Gautami won numerous accolades for her performance, including the Filmfare Award for Best Actress – Tamil.

== Plot ==
Nandha, a young graduate falls in love with Nivedha, an illicit daughter of a venerated judge. The man's father learns of the affair; helps his son set up a scene to introduce Nivedha to their domineering mother, Vedavalli. Vedavalli likes the girl immediately and goes on to the Judge's house asking for Nivedha's hand to his first wife and ends up being bashed up. The second unmarried wife learns of the scene and begs the judge to give a moral life to their daughter. Judge goes to meet Nandha's parents and Vedavalli is not convinced. Nandha's father gives him cash asking him to elope with Nivedha. Meanwhile, the illicit wife gets arranged to be awarded for her acting skills from the hands of her own-not-publicly-known husband by their drama company chief played by Janagaraj. The scenes run parallel. As Nivedha elopes with Nandha, the award ceremony happens and when the mother was called to be awarded, she was spotted dead not being able to accept her daughter's eloped marriage. When she was shown to fall down, the car in which the couples eloped meets with an accident.

Few months pass by. The couples stay in Ooty where Madhu falls in love with Nandha and that's when it is shown that Nivedha has turned mentally disabled after the accident. Though Nandha firmly resists the entry of Madhu in his life, he is helpless in needing help to look after Nivedha when he's not at home. Janagaraj happens to visit Ooty for a drama and shocked by Nivedha's stage, asks Nandha to go for a booze party. Nandha comes back home not conscious. Meanwhile, on ill-health issues, Nandha takes Nivedha to a doctor and while treatment, by miracle, Nivedha completely recovers. When everyone around is happy, Madhu gets to know of her pregnancy through Nandha. She decides to hide it. But on the day of Nandha's wedding with Nivedha, Nivedha gets to know. On a conversation with Nandha, Madhu and Janarthanan; Nivedha decides to break the wedding against the wishes of everyone. In the end, Nandha marries Madhu.

== Cast ==
- Rahman as Nandha
- Gautami as Nivedha
- Heera as Madhu
- Janagaraj as Ramasamy
- Poornam Viswanathan
- Manorama as Vedavalli
- Srividya as Kalpanadevi
- Disco Shanti as Ramasamy's wife
- Jaishankar
- Delhi Ganesh
- Ganeshkar
- Sulakshana
- K. S. Jayalakshmi

== Soundtrack ==
The soundtrack was composed by Maragathamani, with lyrics penned by Vaali.

Song	Singers	Length
"Devan Theerpendrum"	K. J. Yesudas	04:43
"Kaalam Ullavarai"	S. P. Balasubrahmanyam, K. S. Chithra	05:38
"Nivedha"	S. P. Balasubrahmanyam	03:17
"Paattu Paattu"	K. S. Chithra	05:16
"Pondatti Kupidumpothu"	K. S. Chithra	04:49
"Pudhiya Pookalai"	S. P. Balasubrahmanyam	04:01
"Yaarai Kaettu"	K. S. Chithra, K. J. Yesudas	04:19

== Reception ==
N. Krishnaswamy of The Indian Express praised Vasanth for his direction and content but was critical of the second half of the film. Sundarji of Kalki criticised the film for lacking a strong and coherent story. At the 39th Filmfare Awards South, Gautami won the Filmfare Award for Best Actress – Tamil, at the 12th Cinema Express Awards, she won the Best Actress (Special) award, and she also won the Film Fans Association Award for Best Actress.
