= Alifa =

2016 film

- আলিফা
- Directed by: Deep Choudhury
- Written by: Deep Choudhury
- Produced by: Arman Ahmed
- Starring: Baharul Islam; Jaya Seal; Victor Banerjee; Al-Mamun Al Siyam; Pakija Hasmi; Satya Ranjan
- Cinematography: Nahid Ahmed
- Edited by: Rabiranjan Maitra
- Music by: Anirban Borthakur; Subir Kumar Das; Bickram Ghosh
- Release dates: December 2016 (Kolkata); 30 March 2018
- Running time: 109 minutes
- Country: India
- Languages: Bengali; Assamese

Alifa (Bengali: আলিফা) is an Indian Bengali drama feature film written and directed by Deep Choudhury and produced by Arman Ahmed. It stars Baharul Islam and Jaya Seal.

Alifa won the Best Debut Film of A Director award to Deep Choudhury in 2017 64th National Film Awards.

== Story ==
This movie carries the story of a couple and their daughter Alifa as they had lost their home to soil erosion by the Beki River at Barpeta and settled in Guwahati for their livelihood.[]

== Cast ==
- Baharul Islam
- Jaya Seal
- Victor Banerjee
- Al-Mamun Al Siyam as Saif
- Prasun Gayen
- Satya Ranjan
- Pakija Hasmi
- Rayan Abdul
- Swapna Dey
- Mahmuda Begum
- Tajmal Hussain
- Pabitra Rabha as Ranjan

== Festivals ==
Alifa premièred at 22nd Kolkata International Film Festival in at Kolkata, West Bengal in November 2016.

Alifa was also screened at Ottawa Indian Film Festival Awards 2017 at Ottawa, Canada

== Reception ==
=== Critical response ===
NEZine.com writes about the film as "Alifa- in search of hope and humanity amidst chaos and despair"

Alifa was also featured in North East Today article in April 2017.

== Accolades ==
The film was screened at 22nd Kolkata International Film Festival

== Awards and nominations ==
64th National Film Awards

- Best Debut Film of A Director – Deep Choudhury. Alifa (2016)
