= Namma Annachi =

- Poster
- Directed by: Dhalapathi
- Screenplay by: Dhalapathi
- Story by: Vasan Brothers
- Produced by: K. S. Srinivasan; K. S. Sivaraman
- Starring: R. Sarathkumar; Radhika; Heera Rajagopal; Rupini
- Cinematography: Siva
- Edited by: G. Jayachandran; G. Gopinath
- Music by: Deva
- Production company: Vasan Brothers
- Release date: 21 May 1994
- Running time: 140 minutes
- Country: India
- Language: Tamil

Namma Annachi (transl. Our brother) is a 1994 Indian Tamil-language action drama film directed by Dhalapathi. The film stars R. Sarathkumar in a triple role, along with Radhika, Heera Rajagopal and Rupini. The music was composed by Deva, and the film released on 21 May 1994.

== Plot ==
Ayya was an honest police officer in a remote village. The villagers respected him for protecting the village against the heartless don Vaiyapuri. Ayya lived happily with his wife and son Annachi. One day, Vaiyapuri killed Ayya and his wife in front of Annachi. In turn, the young Annachi stabbed Vaiyapuri and fled to the city.

20 years later, Annachi does odd jobs for a living and eventually becomes a brave man who fights against injustice. An old couple adopts him. Meanwhile, Vaiyapuri and his son Vadivelu control the city. Annachi starts working at Vaiyapuri's factory, where he realizes that the laborers are paid less. Gayathri, a labor officer, speaks in favor of the laborers, but Vaiyapuri tactfully frames her for prostitution and sends her to jail. Annachi rescues and marries her. During a labor strike, Vaiyapuri kills one of the laborers, and a furious Annachi kills Vaiyapuri in revenge.

20 years later, Annachi becomes a godfather, helping the poor and oppressed. His only son Prabhakaran becomes a lawyer and falls in love with Priya. Vadivelu is now a corrupt politician. At the election, all citizens vote for the non-candidate Annachi, thus cancelling the election. The angry candidate poisons poor people during Annachi's fest, and Annachi kills him. Prabhakaran witnesses the murder and takes the matter to court, and he wants to punish his father. Annachi is later discharged. Soon, Annachi clashes with Vadivelu, and Vadivelu kills Gayathri. What transpires later forms the crux of the story.

== Cast ==
- R. Sarathkumar as Ayya, Annachi and Prabhakaran
- Radhika as Gayathri
- Heera Rajagopal as Priya
- Rupini as Ayya's wife
- Radha Ravi as Vadivelu
- Mohan Natarajan as Vaiyapuri
- R. Sundarrajan
- S. S. Chandran as Annachi's adoptive father
- Gandhimathi as Annachi's adoptive mother
- Vivek as Nallathambi
- Charuhasan as Priya's father
- Thyagu
- Mahanadi Shankar as Thangapandi
- MRK
- Madhan Bob as Lawyer
- Mohan V. Ram
- Kullamani
- Rani as item number "Enna Dappu Partyinnu"

== Soundtrack ==
The soundtrack was composed by Deva.

Song	Singer(s)	Lyrics	Duration
"Enna Dappa Partyinnu"	S. P. Balasubrahmanyam, K. S. Chithra	Kalidasan	5:00
"Neelagiri Mala Orathila"	S. P. Balasubrahmanyam, K. S. Chithra	Vaali	4:55
"Ooru Sanatha Ootty"	K. J. Yesudas	Vaali	4:52
"Vaararu Vaararu Annachi"	Malaysia Vasudevan, K. S. Chithra	Kalidasan	5:08
"Vaazhkai Oru Porattam"	S. P. Balasubrahmanyam	Vaali	4:00
"Cheran Cholan Pandiyar"	S. P. Balasubrahmanyam, S. Janaki	Vaali	4:32

== Release and reception ==
Namma Annachi was released on 21 May 1994. K. Vijiyan of New Straits Times criticised the director Dhalapathi: "his inexperience shows with his matter-of-fact handling of even the most important events and dialogues with poor use of the cameras" and stated, "to do all three roles is just to generate more publicity for Sarath and the movie". The critic advised the film for only ardent Sarathkumar fans. Malini Mannath of The Indian Express criticised Sarathkumar's performance in the film due to "his difficulty in emoting" and criticised the director for putting "unnecessary strain on him". R. P. R. of Kalki also gave a negative review, calling it a concern for filmmakers to take revenge on fans.
