= Bombay (film) =

1995 Indian film by Mani Ratnam

- Theatrical release poster
- Directed by: Mani Ratnam
- Written by: Mani Ratnam
- Produced by: S. Sriram; Mani Ratnam; Jhamu Sughand
- Starring: Arvind Swamy; Manisha Koirala
- Cinematography: Rajiv Menon
- Edited by: Suresh Urs
- Music by: A. R. Rahman
- Production company: Aalayam Productions
- Distributed by: Aalayam Productions; Ayngaran International; Amitabh Bachchan Corporation (Hindi Version)
- Release date: 10 March 1995
- Running time: 130 minutes
- Country: India
- Language: Tamil

Bombay is a 1995 Indian Tamil-language romantic drama film written and directed by Mani Ratnam, starring Arvind Swamy and Manisha Koirala. The film tells the story of an inter-religious family in Bombay before and during the Bombay riots, which took place between December 1992 and January 1993 after the demolition of the Babri Masjid led to religious tensions between Hindu and Muslim communities. It is the second installment in Ratnam's trilogy of films that depict human relationships against a background of Indian politics, including Roja (1992) and Dil Se.. (1998). The film additionally features some Hindi dialogues.

Bombay was released on 10 March 1995. The film was well-received both critically and commercially successful. It was screened at many international film festivals including the Philadelphia Film Festival in 1996. The film's soundtrack earned composer A. R. Rahman his fourth consecutive Filmfare Best Music Director Award (Tamil), and is considered one of the greatest Indian soundtracks of all time. However, the film caused considerable controversy upon release for its depiction of inter-religious relations between a Muslim woman and a Hindu man. The film was banned in Singapore and Malaysia upon release.

In July 2005, a book on the film by Lalitha Gopalan was published by BFI Modern Classics, looking at the film's production, the several issues it covered, and its impact upon release in India and abroad. The film was ranked among the top 20 Indian films in the British Film Institute's rankings.

== Plot ==
Shekhar Pillai, a progressive journalism student based in Bombay, returns to his native village of Mangudi in Tirunelveli, Tamil Nadu, to visit his orthodox Hindu family. During his stay, he encounters Shaila Banu, a local Muslim schoolgirl and a friend of his sister, and quickly falls in love with her. Although initially hesitant and protective of her traditional boundaries, Shaila eventually reciprocates Shekhar's persistent courtship, and the two enter into a secret romance.

Seeking to legitimize their relationship, Shekhar approaches Shaila’s father, Basheer, to ask for her hand in marriage, but Basheer flatly refuses based on their religious differences. When Shekhar confesses his intentions to his own father, Narayana Pillai, the latter reacts with fury, leading to a hostile and vitriolic public confrontation between Narayana and Basheer. Deeply disheartened by the mutual familial rejection, Shekhar returns to Bombay. He subsequently sends Shaila a train ticket and an invitation to join him. When Basheer discovers the covert correspondence, he immediately arranges an alternative marriage for Shaila to end the romance. Left with no other option, Shaila flees the village using the ticket Shekhar provided and arrives in Bombay.

In Bombay, Shekhar and Shaila marry in a civil ceremony and establish a harmonious life together. Shaila later gives birth to twin sons, whom they name Kabir Narayan and Kamal Basheer, deliberately raising them with an appreciation for both Hindu and Muslim traditions. Over the next six years, Shekhar establishes a successful career as a journalist while Shaila manages their household, and the family integrates comfortably into the multicultural metropolis.

The family's domestic peace is shattered on 6 December 1992, following the demolition of the Babri Masjid, which triggers a wave of violent communal riots across Bombay. Kabir and Kamal are briefly caught in the street violence while running errands, but Shekhar and Shaila manage to rescue them and return home safely. Alarmed by news of the urban warfare, a remorseful Narayana Pillai travels to Bombay to reconcile with his son. He embraced his daughter-in-law and grandchildren, moving into their apartment. Shortly thereafter, Basheer and his wife also arrive from the village, leading to a joyful, albeit temporary, cross-cultural family reunion where both grandfathers dote on the children.

On 5 January 1993, a second wave of deadlier retaliatory riots erupts throughout the city, fueled by targeted political murders. As extremist factions engage in widespread arson and slaughter across the streets, a mob sets fire to Shekhar’s apartment complex. Shekhar attempts an emergency evacuation of the household, but the fire traps Narayana, Basheer, and his wife, killing them instantly in a sudden structural explosion. Amidst the ensuing panic and stampede of fleeing residents, Kabir and Kamal are separated from their parents.

In the chaotic aftermath, Kamal is rescued and sheltered by a protective transgender woman, while a traumatized Kabir wanders the volatile streets alone. Shekhar and Shaila launch a desperate, agonizing search for their sons, navigating overcrowded hospitals and checking morgues for casualties. Devastated by the senseless destruction, Shekhar uses his position as a journalist to unite moderate religious leaders and secular citizens, organizing public peace demonstrations to counter the radical mobs. As the collective appeals for sanity finally cause the riots to subside, Shekhar and Shaila are tearfully reunited with both Kabir and Kamal. Around them, the traumatized citizens of Bombay form a human chain across the streets, renouncing communal hatred in favor of human solidarity.

== Cast ==
- Arvind Swamy as Shekhar Narayanan Pillai
- Manisha Koirala as Shaila Banu (voiced by Rohini)
- Nassar as Narayanan Pillai
- Kitty as Basheer Ahmed
- Tinnu Anand as the Sakthi Samaj Head
- Akash Khurana as a fanatical Muslim leader
- Master Harsha (Sumeet) as Kabir Narayan
- Master Hriday as Kamal Basheer
- A. R. Srinivasan as Police officer
- Crazy Venkatesh as Servant
- Prakash Raj as Kumar
- Rallapalli as a transgender woman
- M. V. Vasudeva Rao
- Pramoth as Periya Thambi
- Vijaya Chandrika as Visalam
- Radhabhai as Pankajam
- Sujitha in a special appearance

Additionally, Sonali Bendre and Nagendra Prasad appear in the item number "Humma Humma".

== Production ==
=== Development ===
During the recording of the background score of Mani Ratnam's Thiruda Thiruda (1993), the Bombay riots broke out. Mani Ratnam planned on making a film in Malayalam about a boy who gets lost in the riots, and requested M. T. Vasudevan Nair to write the script. This was supposed to be Mani Ratnam's second Malayalam film after Unaroo (1985). But since the idea did not materialise, he decided to make it in Tamil as the film that would later be titled Bombay. According to Ratnam, Bombay was not originally planned as a political film: "It was a phase India was going through and these things affected me and found their way into my work."

=== Casting ===
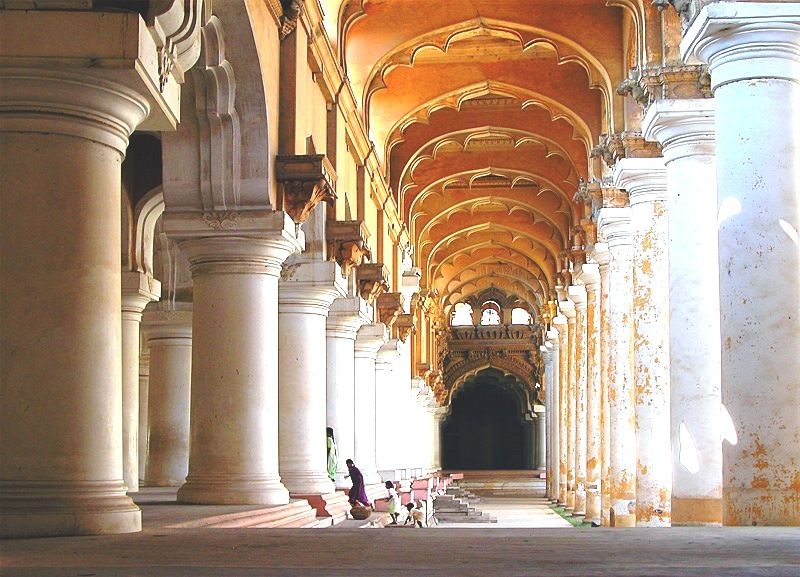
Thirumalai Nayakkar Mahal, where "Kannalane" was shot.

Aishwarya Rai was considered for the female lead, but she opted out due to unavailability of dates, with the production schedules clashing with her Miss World pageant, a title she went on to win. Mani Ratnam held a photoshoot for the film with Vikram and Manisha Koirala, but eventually excluded Vikram as he was unwilling to shave his beard and long hair that he had grown for the production of another film during the period, Pudhiya Mannargal (1994); the role went to Arvind Swamy. Koirala has stated that, though some people advised her against accepting the project since she had to play a mother, she did not listen as there were others who said "it'll be foolish to refuse a Mani Ratnam film". Koirala's voice was dubbed by Rohini. Nassar, a Muslim in real life, was cast as the father of Swamy's character (a Hindu) while Kitty, a Hindu in real life, was cast as the father of Koirala's character (a Muslim). Ratnam deliberately cast them in those roles as a statement. Twins Harsha and Hriday were chosen to play the protagonists' twin sons, from over 70 twins that the director saw but was not impressed. Bombay remains Harsha's only release.

=== Filming ===
When Ratnam approached cinematographer Rajiv Menon to shoot Bombay, he described it as a film about the riots and said that he (Menon) needed to "(make what came before) the riots as beautiful as possible". So Menon suggested shooting in the rains to achieve the effect. They shot the interiors of homes in Pollachi in Tamil Nadu and the exteriors were shot in Kasaragod, and Kannur in Kerala. The song "Kannalane" was shot at Thirumalai Nayakkar Mahal, and "Uyire" was shot at Bekal Fort. The demolition of the Babri Masjid was shown onscreen through newspaper headlines and photographs, as the Censor Board did not want the makers to show the actual destruction.

== Themes and influences ==
Mani Ratnam described Bombay as "a positive film about communal harmony". He said the Bombay riots were not the main focus of the film, but "a helpless, innocent man caught up in violence not of his own making." The film is the second installment in Ratnam's trilogy of films that depict human relationships against a background of Indian politics, including Roja (1992) and Dil Se.. (1998). Bangalore Mirror compared it to the theme of the 1990 movie Come See the Paradise.

== Soundtrack ==
The soundtrack album for Bombay was composed by A. R. Rahman, in his third collaboration with Mani Ratnam after Roja and Thiruda Thiruda. The lyrics for the Tamil version were written by Vairamuthu, except "Humma Humma" and "Halla Gulla" written by Vaali. The soundtrack of the film became one of the best-selling Indian music albums of all time, with sales of 15 million units. The soundtrack was included in The Guardian's "1000 Albums to Hear Before You Die" list, and the song "Kannalanae" sung by K. S. Chithra was included in their "1000 Songs Everyone Must Hear" list. "Bombay Theme" has appeared in various international films and music compilations, while the songs "Kannalanae" and "Bombay Theme" have been sampled by various international artists.

== Release ==
Bombay was released on 10 March 1995. The Hindi-dubbed version and the Telugu-dubbed version were released on the same day. It was previously scheduled to release in January 1995, during Pongal. The film caused considerable controversy upon release in India and abroad for its depiction of inter-religious relations between a Muslim woman and a Hindu man. The film was banned in Singapore and Malaysia upon release. Two homemade bombs were thrown at the house of Mani Ratnam by Radical Islamist terrorists, Mani Ratnam had to be hospitalised with shrapnel injuries.

== Reception ==
=== Box office ===
The Hindi dubbed version of the film grossed ₹140 million (equivalent to ₹910 million or US$9.5 million in 2026), as reported by Box Office India, making it one of the year's ten highest-grossing Hindi films.

=== Critical reception ===
Ananda Vikatan, in a review dated 19 March 1995, rated the film 53 out of 100. Anand Kannan, writing for Planet Bollywood, said, "I wouldn't call this the best of Mani Ratnam [...] But good acting, a socially conscious theme and a quick pace make the movie well worth watching." In 1996, American critic James Berardinelli rated the film 3.5 out of 4 and said, "Largely because of their limited North American appeal and dubious quality, Indian movies are routinely ignored by distributors [...] Occasionally, however, a worthwhile picture causes enough people to take notice that it becomes a favorite on the international film festival circuit. One such movie is Bombay, the fourteenth feature from celebrated director Mani Rathnam." He concluded, "Director Rathnam has shown great courage in making this picture (bombs were thrown at his house after it opened in India), which speaks with a voice that many will not wish to hear. Bombay recalls how forceful a motion picture can be." R. P. R. of Kalki wrote that with far cry from average cinema, this film raises a thousand questions about social morality, not just Mani Ratnam; it has given every Indian a chance to be proud.

== Accolades ==
Award (Note: Awards, festivals and organizations are in alphabetical order.)	Date of ceremony (Note: Date is linked to the article about the awards held that year, wherever possible.)	Category	Recipient(s)	Result	Ref.
Cinema Express Awards	1995	Best Film – Tamil	Bombay – Mani Ratnam	Won	
Cinema Express Awards	1995	Best Director – Tamil	Mani Ratnam	Won	
Cinema Express Awards	1995	Best Actor (Special Award)	Arvind Swamy	Won	
Cinema Express Awards	1995	Best Actress (Special Award)	Manisha Koirala	Won	
Cinema Express Awards	1995	Best Lyricist – Tamil	Vairamuthu	Won	
Cinema Express Awards	1995	Best Female Playback Singer – Tamil	K. S. Chithra	Won	
Edinburgh International Film Festival	1996	Gala Award	Bombay – Mani Ratnam	Won	
Filmfare Awards	2 March 1996	Critics Award for Best Film	Bombay – Mani Ratnam (Note: The only dubbed film to win the award.)	Won	
Filmfare Awards	2 March 1996	Critics Award for Best Actress	Manisha Koirala (Note: Koirala is the only actress who has won the award for a non-Hindi film as Bombay was dubbed in Hindi.)	Won	
Filmfare Awards South	14 September 1996	Best Film – Tamil	Bombay – S. Sriram	Won	
Filmfare Awards South	14 September 1996	Best Director – Tamil	Mani Ratnam	Won	
Filmfare Awards South	14 September 1996	Best Actress – Tamil	Manisha Koirala	Won	
Filmfare Awards South	14 September 1996	Best Music Director – Tamil	A. R. Rahman	Won	
Jerusalem Film Festival	4–13 July 1996	Honorable Mention	Bombay – Mani Ratnam	Won	
Matri Shree Media Award	6 May 1996	Best Film	Mani Ratnam	Won	
National Film Awards	6 August 1996	Best Feature Film on National Integration	Producer: Mani Ratnam and S. Sriram; Director: Mani Ratnam	Won	
National Film Awards	6 August 1996	Best Editing	Suresh Urs	Won	
Political Film Society	1996	Special Award	Bombay – Mani Ratnam	Won	
Tamil Nadu State Film Awards	1997	Best Lyricist	Vairamuthu (Note: also for Muthu.)	Won	
Tamil Nadu State Film Awards	1997	Best Female Playback Singer	K. S. Chithra – (for "Kannalane")	Won	

== Bibliography ==
- Gopalan, Lalitha (2019) [2005]. Bombay. Bloomsbury Publishing. ISBN 978-0-85170-956-7.
- Rangan, Baradwaj (2012). Conversations with Mani Ratnam. India: Penguin Books. ISBN 978-0-670-08520-0.
