= S. Sriram =

Indian film producer (died 2019)

- Died: 4 September 2019
- Occupation: Film producer
- Spouse: Nalini Sriram

S. Sriram was an Indian film producer from Tamil Nadu.

== Biography ==
Sriram and Mani Ratnam established Aalayam Productions. He produced films like Thiruda Thiruda, Bombay and Aasai. Samurai was the last film which was produced by him.

Sriram died of cardiac arrest on 4 September 2019.

== Selected filmography ==
- Chatriyan (1990)
- Dasarathan (1993)
- Thiruda Thiruda (1993)
- Bombay (1995)
- Aasai (1995)
- Samurai (2002)
