= Jaya Seal =

Indian actress & dancer (born c.1972)

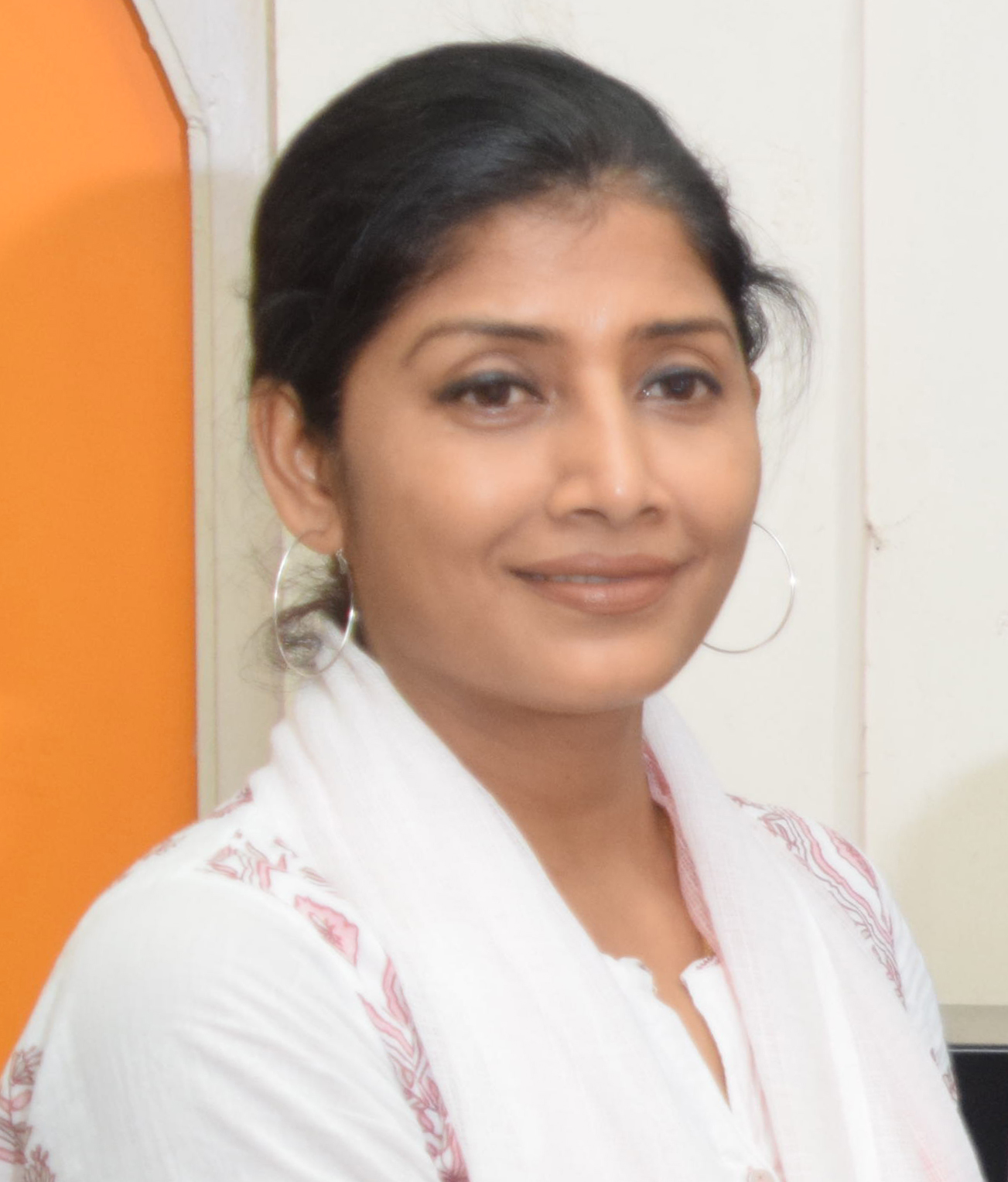
- Born: c. 1972; Guwahati, India
- Occupations: Actress, dancer
- Years active: 1999–present
- Spouse: Bickram Ghosh

Jaya Seal Ghosh (née Seal) is an Indian actress and dancer. She was trained in Bharatanatyam from an early age by Guru Indira P. P. Bora for five years. She also acted in Assamnee television and plays with Assamnee theatre personalities from NSD like Dulal Roy and Baharul Islam (actor) who inspired her. She studied at the National School of Drama in New Delhi where she had completed her three-year course in 1997.

Jaya went on to act in 19 feature films in 8 languages, and appeared in several ad commercials. Some of the Jaya's films received National and International Awards in Venice and Pusan Film Festivals. Among her best films, she holds Uttara, by Buddhadeb Dasgupta. She was nominated for best actress in 2000 for the film Uttara. She was also seen in ‘Kahani Ghar Ghar Ki’ in 2004.

Some of her well-known films are Chal & Xcuse Me (Hindi), Pennin Manathai Thottu (Tamil) opposite Prabhu Deva, Samurai (Tamil) opposite Vikram, Bahala Channa Gide (Kannada) opposite Shivraj Kumar, Magunido Sagodo (Odiya) which won the National Award for best Odiya film in 2003, Thilaadanam (Telugu) which won National Award for best debut director to the late 6 time National and International award-winning Film Critic and Director K.N.T. Sastry and also won best foreign film and New Currents Award award in Pussan film festival in 2003, Shesh Thikana (Bengali) etc. She has worked in more than thirty ad commercials like Dettol, Colgate, Clinic plus oil n shampoo, Sun drop oil etc.

She received the Best Actress Award at the Assam Prag Cine Awards for the Assamnese film Shrinkhol in 2014.

Throughout this phase, she also continued to dance. While she was in Mumbai she was trained by Guru Vaibhav Arekar and Guru Rajeshri Shirke at Lasya academy. Later she was trained by Guru Naresh Pillai.

After shifting to Kolkata, Jaya joined Kalamandalam under the guidance of Guru Thankamani Kutty in the year 2005. she continued her learning under Bidushi Rama Vaidyanathan. Jaya has performed as a dancer at many prestigious venues. She regaled audiences at Detroit's Cobo Arena at the inauguration of the 2007 Bengali Sammelan & Muscat show in May 2015.

Jaya also worked with renowned theatre personality Usha Ganguly as the main lead in her production Chandalika. She acted in the film Arshinagar directed by Aparna Sen. Film Alifa in Bengali language shot at Guwahati directed by Deep Choudhury which was selected in the year 2016. For the 22nd Kolkata International Film Festival she received best debut director award in 2017 national award and Best film in OTTAWA film FEST. She won the best actress award for the film Alifa in Lonawala Film Festival (LIFT). In 2018 and received best actress award in Hyderabad ((Bengali film)) festival for the film Alifa.

== Filmography ==
Year	Film	Role	Language	Notes
1999	Amrita		Hindi	
2000	Pennin Manathai Thottu	Sunitha	Tamil	
2000	Shesh Thikana	Sriradha	Bengali	
2000	Uttara	Uttara	Bengali	
2000	Thilaadanam		Telugu	
2001	Sesh Upahar		Assamese	
2001	Kalakalappu	Thilaga	Tamil	
2001	Bahala Chennagide		Kannada	
2002	Magunira Shagada		Odia	
2002	Samurai	Kavitha	Tamil	
2002	Evare Atagaadu	Sneha	Telugu	credited as Jaya
2002	Chhal	Padmini	Hindi	
2002	Desh Devi	Gayatri	Hindi	
2003	Xcuse Me	Monica Khurana	Hindi	
2004	Hotath Neerar Jonnyo	Rani	Bengali	
2011	Katakuti	Sudeshna	Bengali	
2012	Quartet 1		Hindi	
2014	Sringkhal	Ambika	Assamese	Prag Cine Awards for Best Actress
2015	Arshinagar	Madhu Mitra	Bengali	
2016	One Little Finger		English	
2018	Alifa	Fatima	Bengali	
2018	Dawshobhuja- A Durgachitra	cameo appearance	Bengali	
TBA	Flowers of the Mountain	Jayalakshmi Subramaniam	Hindi	

== Television ==
- Kahani Ghar Ghar Ki as Swati
- Rishtey – Episode 79
- Aashram Season 3 (Web series)
