= Poovellam Kettuppar =

- DVD cover
- Directed by: Vasanth
- Written by: Crazy Mohan (Dialogue)
- Screenplay by: Vasanth
- Story by: Vasanth
- Produced by: Meena Panchu Arunachalam
- Starring: Suriya; Jyothika
- Cinematography: M. S. Prabhu
- Edited by: A. Sreekar Prasad
- Music by: Yuvan Shankar Raja
- Production company: P. A. Art Production
- Release date: 6 August 1999
- Running time: 148 minutes
- Country: India
- Language: Tamil

Poovellam Kettuppar (transl. Ask all the flowers) is a 1999 Indian Tamil-language romantic comedy musical film written and directed by Vasanth. It stars Suriya and Jyothika. Vijayakumar, Nassar, Vadivelu and Ambika appear in supporting roles. The film was released on 6 August 1999.

== Plot ==
Two music directors, Bharathi and Kannan, used to be friends and composed music together. After Kannan has a fight with the director on a project, Bharathi decides to split from Kannan and compose the music by himself. He offers Kannan the chance to reconcile after the movie, but Kannan rejects the offer and gives details about the fallout to newspapers, causing Bharathi to lose the movie deal.

Kannan's daughter Janaki lives with her grandparents and mother in Bangalore while her father, struggles with his friend Ramanathan in Chennai. Janaki goes on a college tour and stays at a hotel, where Krishna, Bharathi's son, is staying. He falls in love with her and tries to woo her, but she rejects his advances. Four days later, Janaki misses her bus to college and she takes a public bus home. Krishna gets on the bus to impress her. After taking a ride from a drunk driver, Janaki lets Krishna drive.

On the way, the drunk driver becomes sober and leaves them stranded until Janaki stops another bus. On their journey, they learn their fathers' identities. Krishna takes Janaki back to her college and leaves, but they admit their feelings for one another. Krishna has to return to Chennai because his mother is in the hospital. He promises Janaki that he will speak to his father about their marriage, and Janaki has one condition: if they disapprove, she will not elope with Krishna without her parents' consent. Krishna agrees and goes to see his mother.

The doctor tells Krishna's mother that she will send a nurse to their home to help her. At the same time, Bharathi has a fallout with a prominent director and Kannan is recruited to anger Bharathi. Kannan's music in the movie becomes successful and he becomes an overnight sensation — gaining fame and being flooded with offers. Bharathi is severely affected by the fallout and loses his status and offers, further angering him. In response, Krishna goes to Kannan's house as a driver while telling his parents that he went to Bombay to pursue further studies, and Janaki pretends to be the nurse that the family doctor sent and tells her parents that she has an extra class at college.

Krishna assumes the name of Driver Pandi while Janaki becomes Nurse Kalyani. Janaki impresses Krishna's parents while Krishna does the same with Janaki's. Problems arise when Krishna is kicked out of Kannan's house when he takes the blame for Kannan's father-in-law accidentally telling the media about Kannan's drinking. Janaki is kicked out as she stands up to Bharathi and tells him it is ironic that he is named after Bharathiyaar, who fought for women's rights, when he does not allow his wife to sing in public after their marriage.

Bharathi realises his mistake and invites Janaki back. Krishna, however, has to struggle much more to gain back Kannan's trust. Kannan has a fight with a director, which gives Kannan a bad image in the media. When Kannan realises that Krishna helped him out despite his anger, he invites him back to his house. Krishna and Janaki tell Kannan and Bharathi that they are in love and that their parents and their lover's parents are against it. They convince them to speak to the lovers' parents. The families arrive at a beach house. Krishna's parents accept the union, but Kannan storms off. Kannan's wife convinces the couple that Kannan will not miss his only daughter's wedding.

Kannan does not turn up for the wedding. Janaki and Krishna turn up at his house; Krishna tells him that they are not married and that they won't until he approves. Krishna claims that they will wait and remain lovers until Kannan gives his consent. As Krishna drives away, he comes to a sudden halt as Kannan and his family block his path. Kannan tells him that he better marry Janaki or else. Janaki then brings Bharathi while Krishna brings Kannan to him, and they reconcile.

== Cast ==
- Suriya as Krishna Bharathi/Palpandi
- Jyothika as Janaki Kannan/Kalyani
- Vijayakumar as K. R. Bharathi
- Nassar as C.R. Kannan
- Ambika as Nirmala Bharathi
- Karan as Venu Mahadevan
- Delhi Ganesh as Ramanathan
- Vadivelu as Shanmugam
- Vadivukkarasi as Kasthuri
- Kovai Sarala as Dr. Bala Thirupurasundari
- Maadhu Balaji as Balaji
- Dhamu as Dhamu
- Madhan Bob as Rathavelu
- Kaka Radhakrishnan as Rangasamy
- Kavitha as Lakshmi
- Pasi Sathya as Nurse Kalyani
- Poovilangu Mohan as Association Secretary
- Thadi Balaji as Reporter
- R. Sundaramoorthy as EB worker
- Raju Sundaram (special appearance in the song "Oh Senyoreeta")
- Dinesh (special appearance in the song "CBI Enge")
- Japan Kumar (special appearance in the song "CBI Enge")
- Bhavatharini as herself (special appearance in the song "Poothathu")
- Agathiyan as himself (special appearance) (Note: credited as Special Thanks)
- Manorama as herself (special appearance)
- Ganesh (of Shankar–Ganesh) as himself (special appearance)
- Pyramid Natarajan as himself (special appearance)

Cameo appearances as themselves in the song "Sevvaanam Vetkam Kondathu" (in order of appearance)

- Srinivas
- Ramki
- Ranjitha
- Sonia
- Kannadasan (photo appearance)
- Bharathiraja
- Prabhu
- Simran
- Sivaji Ganesan
- R. Parthiban
- Meena
- Revathi
- Karthik
- R. Sarathkumar
- K. Balachander
- Theni Kunjarammal

== Production ==
The film was initially titled Romance, but was later retitled Poovellam Kettuppar during production. Poovellam Kettupar was one of the working titles for the director Vasanth's previous film Aasai (1995). Vasanth considered changing the title again briefly to Thathi Thaavathu Manasu, but eventually decided not to do so. During production, media speculation arose that the lead pair, Suriya and Jyothika, were dating. The film was the first of seven films in which Suriya appeared alongside Jyothika, whom he married in 2006.

The film shared a similar storyline to several other Tamil films released during the same period including Jodi, which incidentally had Vijayakumar and Nassar playing similar roles as patriarchs of feuding families. Likewise the films Minsara Kanna (1999) and Anbulla Kadhalukku (1999) were also noted for similarities in their plots.

== Soundtrack ==
The soundtrack features eight songs composed by Yuvan Shankar Raja. The album opened the opportunity for his first breakthrough in the industry and proved to be a major turning point in his career.

All lyrics are written by Palani Bharathi.

Track listing
No.	Title	Singer(s)	Length
1.	"CBI Enge"	Sukhwinder Singh	6:04
2.	"Chudithar Aninthu"	Hariharan, Sadhana Sargam	5:56
3.	"Irava Pagala"	Hariharan, Sujatha Mohan	5:12
4.	"Poothathu"	Bhavatharini	3:02
5.	"Poove Poove" (female)	Nithyasree Mahadevan	5:55
6.	"Poove Poove" (male)	P. Unnikrishnan	5:53
7.	"Oh Senyoreeta"	P. Unnikrishnan	5:01
8.	"Sevvaanam Vetkam Kondathu"	Srinivas	2:45
Total length:			39:48

== Reception ==
Rajitha of Rediff.com described the film as "a winner" and praised Vasanth's direction. D. S. Ramanujam of The Hindu praised the director, saying he "maintains a light vein right through, the humour escalating as the drama thickens". K. P. S. of Kalki praised the film's cast, humour and music. A critic from The New Indian Express wrote that "The-romantic part has little novelty, but Jyothika and Surya perform with bouncy exuberance. The absolutely enchanting musical score by Yuvan Shankar Raja (Ilayaraja's son) bears testimony to his 'Raja' surname. But like the edifice that crumbled due to an unstable pillar, the entire movie collapses under the weight of a debutant editor".

Although the film performed well outside of India, it was received poorly domestically, which Vasanth attributed to when the film was released and the lack of publicity. Vasanth's wife Renuga won the Tamil Nadu State Film Award for Best Costume Designer in 1999 for her work in the film.
