= Thiruda Thiruda =

1993 film by Mani Ratnam

- Theatrical release poster
- Directed by: Mani Ratnam
- Dialogues by: Sujatha; Suhasini
- Screenplay by: Mani Ratnam
- Story by: Mani Ratnam; Ram Gopal Varma
- Produced by: S. Sriram; Mani Ratnam
- Starring: Prashanth; Anand; Anu Aggarwal; Heera Rajagopal
- Cinematography: P. C. Sriram
- Edited by: Suresh Urs
- Music by: A. R. Rahman
- Production company: Aalayam Productions
- Distributed by: Aalayam Productions
- Release date: 13 November 1993
- Running time: 170 minutes
- Country: India
- Language: Tamil

Thiruda Thiruda (transl. Thief! Thief!) is a 1993 Indian Tamil-language black comedy caper film directed by Mani Ratnam written along with Ram Gopal Varma. The film stars Prashanth, Anand, Anu Aggarwal and Heera Rajagopal while Salim Ghouse and S. P. Balasubrahmanyam play supporting roles. The film's soundtrack and background score were composed by A. R. Rahman while the cinematography was handled by P. C. Sriram. In 1994, the film premièred at the Toronto International Film Festival. It also won the National Film Award for Best Special Effects. This is the only film that Anu Aggarwal has acted in Tamil.

== Plot ==
Printed Indian currency from the Reserve Bank of India security press at Nasik with an estimated value of ₹ 1000 crores, is stolen from a train by T. T. Vikram, a gangster and drug dealer living in London. The container is shipped off by Vikram's henchman and is on the move. The access card of the container goes to the possession of pop star Chandralekha, an acquaintance of Vikram. CBI SP Lakshminarayanan is assigned to track down the stolen currency within the next ten days, on time for the upcoming budget allotment for the fiscal year.

Lakshminarayanan tracks down Chandralekha who tactfully escapes from him and tries to reach Vikram, when she comes across two small time burglars – Kadhir and Azhagu. The duo are on the run from the police after a successful burglary in the countryside. A village belle Rasathi, who tries to escape from her abusive relatives also tags along with the thieving duo. Chandralekha and the trio end up traveling together due to circumstances. When Chandralekha tries to double cross the thieves and escape, they steal her purse containing the access card as revenge. Realizing this, she comes back to them and only then does the duo realize the actual worth of the access card. They all make a plan to pursue the money container somehow, but Vikram tries to chase down and kill all of them to get the card back at any cost.

While on the run from the police and Vikram, they come across the very same truck containing the loot and manage to bring it under their possession. They hide it away from prying eyes with the entirety of the loot still intact inside the container. With Lakshminarayanan and his brigade of CBI officers close at his tail, Vikram stops at nothing to get his loot back, but is outwitted repeatedly by the thieves. Vikram finally manages to find Chandralekha, gets the access card from her and she is left to die in the forest, but is rescued and taken into custody by Lakshminarayanan, who interrogates her and she cooperates with them to find the container.

Meanwhile, Kadhir and Rasathi are mutually attracted to each other but Kadhir sacrifices his love for her after realizing that his best friend Azhagu is also in love with Rasathi. Rasathi, who does not want to continue with this love triangle, opts out and leaves them both, but Vikram captures her. Kadhir and Azhagu, in a bid to save her, point to the location of the currency container and Vikram escapes with the loot on a train, taking Rasathi as a hostage.

Lakshminarayanan finds that the loot is being transported on a train and is in hot pursuit, while Kadhir and Azhagu also get on the train to save Rasathi from Vikram. They save Rasathi together and subdue Vikram, who falls off the train. Azhagu also steals the access card from him. Now that they are finally in possession of the loot, Kadhir and Azhagu playfully argue about who would marry Rasathi and leave the other to manage the loot, each indicating that they are more interested in the money than their love for Rasathi, so she grabs the access card and throws it away and chases them around.

Lakshminarayanan arrives at the nick of time and takes the access card and the currency container back to the Indian government where it actually belongs and finally restores order.

== Cast ==
- Prashanth as Azhagu
- Anand as Kathir
- Anu Aggarwal as Chandralekha (Voice-over by actress Vaishnavi)
- Heera Rajagopal as Rasathi (Voice-over by actress Suhasini Maniratnam)
- Salim Ghouse as T. T. Vikram
- S. P. Balasubrahmanyam as Lakshmi Narayanan SP, CBI
- Malaysia Vasudevan as Inspector Santhosham
- S. S. Chandran as Lorry driver
- Shanmugasundaram as Chengalvarayan
- P. C. Ramakrishna as Finance Minister of India
- Oru Viral Krishna Rao as Tollgate employee
- Thalaivasal Vijay as Vijay, Associate of Lakshmi Narayanan
- Madhan Bob as K. B. S., Associate of Lakshmi Narayanan
- Ajay Rathnam as Ashok Chellaiya
- Kavithalaya Krishnan as Constable Kaliyaperumal
- Crazy Venkatesh as Horseman
- Pravin as Pravin
- Dhamu as Doss
- Vaani as Pushpavalli
- Renuka as Seethalakshmi

== Production ==
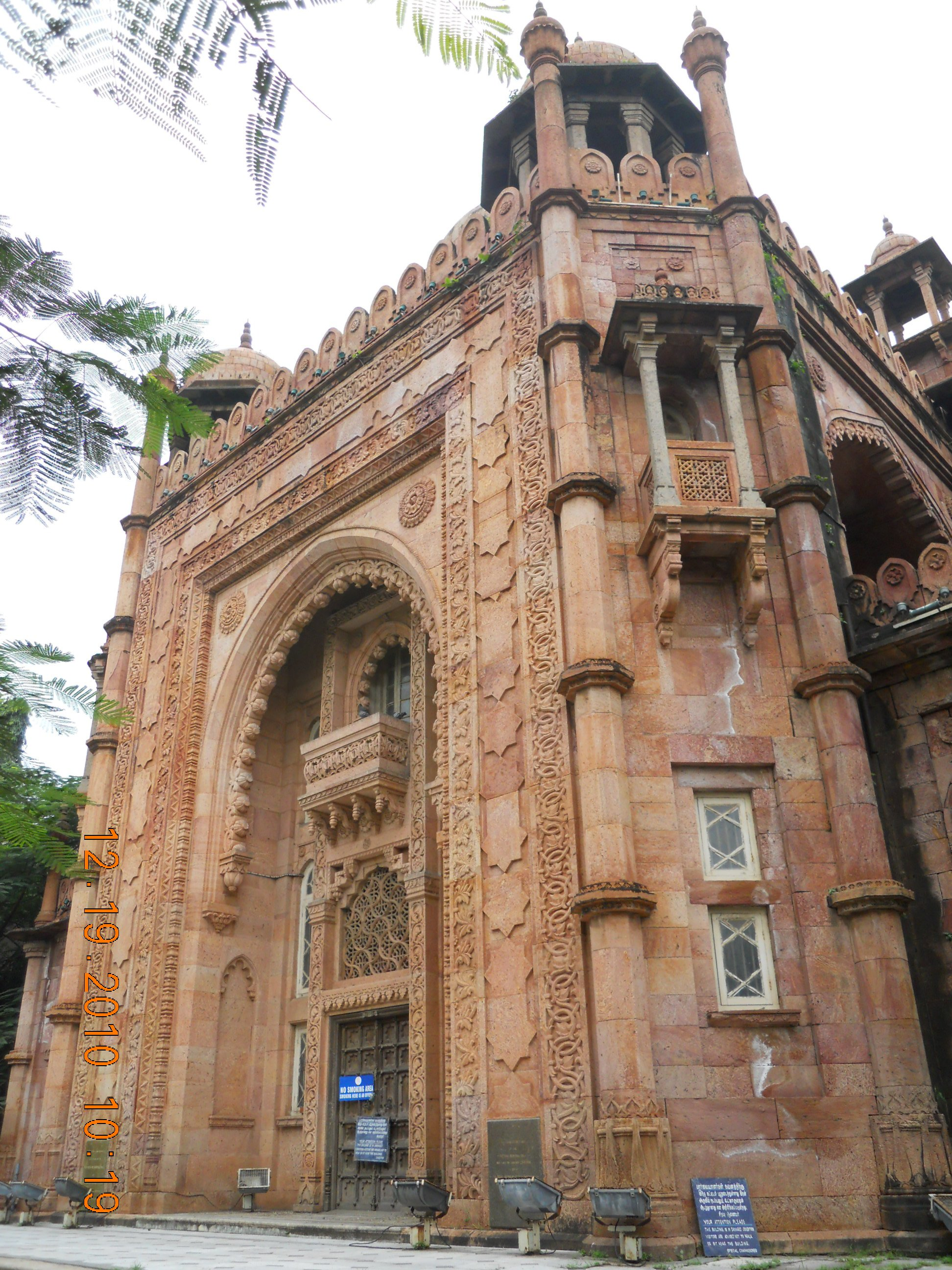
The National Art Gallery, one of the museum buildings in Government Museum, seen in the song "Chandralekha".

In late 1992, Mani Ratnam chose to make the caper film Thiruda Thiruda as his first directorial venture under his newly set-up production studio, Aalayam Productions, alongside his co-producer Sriram. When writing the script of the film, Mani Ratnam went on a recce with Ram Gopal Varma and both filmmakers spent a few days each fine-tuning each other's scripts. While Varma worked on parts of Thiruda Thiruda, Mani Ratnam helped script Varma's Gaayam (1993). With the script of Thiruda Thiruda, he wanted to attempt the caper genre for the first time and took Rajasekhar's Vikram (1986) and Varma's Kshana Kshanam (1991) as his initial inspirations. He was also inspired by the ongoing financial scandal involving stockbroker Harshad Mehta, which had made Indian national news during early 1992 and chose to adapt his script accordingly. The American film Butch Cassidy and the Sundance Kid (1969) was another influence on Thiruda Thiruda.

J. D. Chakravarthy was initially meant to play the role of Kadhir before Anand was selected. Salim Ghouse, a renowned theatre artist, was roped into play an antagonist. Before finalising Anu Aggarwal for a role, Mani Ratnam considered Dimple Kapadia but opted against signing her as he wanted to select an actress new to Tamil cinema. Actress Meena were also approached for role in the film but refused the opportunity due to other commitments. K. V. Anand was among P. C. Sriram's assistant cinematographers in the film.

== Release and reception ==
Thiruda Thiruda was released on 13 November 1993. Malini Mannath wrote for The Indian Express on 19 November, "Thiruda Thiruda is a technique conscious film that may seem sparkling and wondrous to the technique crazy cine-goer though it never really takes off after the interval". The film won the National Film Award for Best Special Effects and National Film Award for Best Choreography for Sundaram.

== Soundtrack ==
The soundtrack features 9 songs (6 Songs included on the Soundtrack) composed by A. R. Rahman, with lyrics by Vairamuthu. The film's songs are notable for two reasons—the introduction of relatively unknown vocalists into mainstream Tamil playback singing and the extensive use of experimental sounds in South Indian cinema. While vocalist Annupamaa in the technopop song "Chandralekha" and the Filipina singer Caroline in "Thee Thee" sang their first mainstream songs, the late singer Shahul Hameed was roped in to sing the A cappella number Raasathi. The song "Veerapandi Kottayile" became a big hit across South India. The tune of "Thee Thee" was originally composed by Rahman for an advertisement that never aired.

The lyrics for the Tamil version were penned by Vairamuthu, while Rajashri and P. K. Mishra penned lyrics for the Telugu and Hindi versions.

The music label for the Tamil and Telugu versions are Sony Music India while the Hindi version is under Saregama.

All lyrics are written by Vairamuthu; all music is composed by A. R. Rahman.

Tamil Track listing
No.	Title	Singer(s)	Length
1.	"Kannum Kannum"	Mano
2.	"Konjam Nilavu (Chandralekha)"	Annupamaa; Suresh Peters
3.	"Veerapandi Kottayile"	Mano, K. S. Chithra; Unni Menon
4.	"Putham Pudhu Bhoomi"	Mano, K. S. Chithra
5.	"Rasathi"	Shahul Hameed; Sujatha Mohan; Ganga
6.	"Thee Thee"	Carolene; Noel James

Not included in the Original Soundtrack

No.	Title	Singer(s)	Length
7.	"Aathukulla Ayira Meenu"	Suresh Peters, Srinivas
8.	"Thiruda Thiruda"	G. V. Prakash Kumar
9.	"Theme Music" (Instrumental)	-

Telugu version

Song	Singer(s)	Time	Lyricist
"Kotha Bangaru"	K. S. Chithra; Mano	4:23	Rajashri
"Aakatayi"	G. V. Prakash Kumar	0:23	Rajashri
"Koncham Neeru"	Annupamaa	5:44	Rajashri
"Veerabobbili"	K. S. Chithra; Unni Menon; Mano	6:27	Rajashri
"Kanulu Kanulanu"	Mano	4:06	Rajashri
"Ettilona"	Srinivas; Suresh Peters	1:22	Rajashri
"Sitaalu"	Shahul Hameed	4:16	Rajashri
"Thee Thee"	Sujatha Mohan	4:56	Rajashri

Hindi version

Song	Singer(s)	Time	Lyricist
"Chandralekha"	Annupamaa	5:41	P. K. Mishra
"Chor Chor"	G. V. Prakash Kumar	0:24	P. K. Mishra
"Dil Hi Sanam Dil"	Sujatha Mohan	4:55	P. K. Mishra
"Hum Bhi Tum Bhi"	Udit Narayan; Mano	4:05	P. K. Mishra
"Jhoom Jhoom"	K. S. Chithra; S. P. Balasubrahmanyam	4:33	P. K. Mishra
"Joor Laga"	Srinivas, Suresh Peters	1:28	P. K. Mishra
"Pyaar Kabhi"	K. S. Chithra, Udit Narayan, Mano	6:33	P. K. Mishra

The song "Kannum Kannum" was also sampled in Hindi as "Kunjam Kunjam Pyar Ki Baatein" for the film album Deewana Sanam. This sampled version has S. P. Balasubrahmanyam and S. Janaki as the singers and Nikhil-Vinay as the composer.

== Legacy ==
The song "Kannum Kannum" inspired a 2020 film titled Kannum Kannum Kollaiyadithaal. A film with the same name had earlier been planned by Pandiarajan in 2002, but was later shelved.

== Bibliography ==
- Rangan, Baradwaj (2012). Conversations with Mani Ratnam. Penguin Books. ISBN 978-0-670-08520-0.
- Rajadhyaksha, Ashish; Willemen, Paul (1998) [1994]. Encyclopaedia of Indian Cinema (PDF). British Film Institute and Oxford University Press. ISBN 0-19-563579-5.
