= Vasanth =

Indian film director

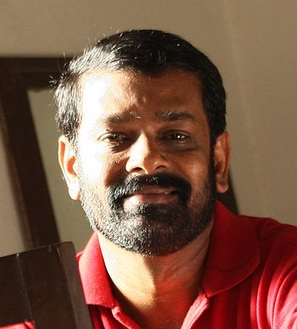
- Director Vasanth
- Born: Devakottai, Tamilnadu, India
- Occupation: Director
- Years active: 1987–present

Vasanth is an Indian director well known in Tamil language films for directing films such as Keladi Kanmani (1990), Aasai (1995), Nerrukku Ner (1997), Rhythm (2000) and Satham Podathey (2007).

== Career ==
Vasanth began his career as a journalist and short story writer, before he began working as an assistant director to K. Balachander on 18 films including Sindhu Bhairavi and Punnagai Mannan. He made his first independent film in 1990, the critically acclaimed film Keladi Kanmani, which starred noted playback singer S. P. Balasubrahmanyam and enjoyed a 285-days-run at theatres. He next directed Nee Pathi Naan Pathi, titled after a song from his previous film, which focussed on an unwed mother's issue. The film features the song "Nivedha", becoming noted for its visualisation and its lyrics consisting of a single word. His third directorial was the thriller Aasai (1995), which became a trendsetter and high financial success that ran for more than 200 days. Produced by Mani Ratnam. as well as the feature film debut of lead actress Suvalakshmi, while Vasanth received the Tamil Nadu State Film Award for Best Director.

In 1997, Vasanth's next project, Nerrukku Ner released. Also produced by Maniratnam, the film introduced actor Sivakumar's eldest son Suriya, who played a leading role and Bollywood actress Simran alongside Vijay and Kausalya also became a commercial success and ran for 175 days. Vasanth's subsequent project Poovellam Kettuppar (1999), also starred Suriya, pairing for the first time with Jyothika, who would later become his wife. The film is especially known as being composer Yuvan Shankar Raja's first major musical success. The following year, two of his directorial released, Appu and Rhythm. The former was appreciated for Prakash Raj's performance as a eunuch, whilst the latter is considered a classic, mainly for its theme and realism by critics and public. Rhythm told the tale of two individuals who lose their life partners in the same accident and overcome their sorrow to start a new relationship. The film's soundtrack, scored by A. R. Rahman consists of five songs, each depicting one of the five elements. Vasanth had picked Rhythm to be the film "closest to heart". Yai! Nee Romba Azhaga Irukke! (2002) was his following project, with its major attraction being the first ensemble soundtrack in Indian cinema, featuring five songs, composed by five debutant music directors but failed at the box office. In 2007, he made the thriller film Satham Podathey (2007), which was critically acclaimed but not a commercial hit. and a blockbuster at the box office, while fetching him a Tamil Nadu State Film Award for Best Storywriter. 2013 he made the romantic musical Moondru Per Moondru Kadhal, a film involving three love stories. In 2015, he began his next feature film titled Sivaranjaniyum Innum Sila Pengalum, reported to be a "pro-women film", in which he would introduce Carnatic singer Sudha Ragunathan as a music director.

During his sabbaticals from filmmaking, Vasanth has worked on several ad films, short films and documentaries as well. The short films, Thakkayin Methu Naanku Kangal (தக்கையின் மீது நான்கு கண்கள்), for which he won the National Film Award for Best Short Fiction Film at the 2005 ceremony, and the critically acclaimed Visaranai Commission, based on Sakithya Academy prize-winning novel by Sa. Kandhasami, are the other notable works in his career. He has directed more than 40 advertising films for multinational brands and co-directed the Vijay TV extravaganza Netru, Indru, Naalai along with Mani Ratnam. Besides, Vasanth has been conducting workshops, too, teaching nuances of filmmaking.

== Filmography ==
Year	Film	Notes			
Year	Film	Notes	1990	Keladi Kanmani	Tamil Nadu State Film Award for Best Film
1991	Nee Pathi Naan Pathi				
1995	Aasai	Tamil Nadu State Film Award for Best Director			
1997	Nerrukku Ner				
1999	Poovellam Kettuppar				
2000	Appu				
2000	Rhythm				
2002	Yai! Nee Romba Azhaga Irukke!				
2005	Thakkaiyin Meedhu Naangu Kangal	National Film Award for Best Short Film			
2007	Satham Podathey	Tamil Nadu State Film Award for Best Story Writer			
2013	Moondru Per Moondru Kadal				
2016	Sanath	Short film; National Film Award for Best Film on Social Issues			
2021	Sivaranjiniyum Innum Sila Pengalum	2022 National Film Award for Best Feature Film in Tamil; Released on a digital platform Sony LIV			

Web series

Year	Web Series	Role	Language	Notes
2021	Navarasa	Director (Payasam)	Tamil	A Netflix anthology web series; Segment : Payasam

=== Voice artist ===
Year	Film	Role	Actor	Notes
1982	Gandhi	Mahatma Gandhi	Ben Kingsley	Dubbed for older Gandhi

=== Actor ===
Films

Year	Film	Role
1987	Manathil Uruthi Vendum	Reporter
1988	Unnal Mudiyum Thambi	Reporter
2014	Ninaithathu Yaaro	Himself
2015	Vai Raja Vai	Karthik's father

Television

- Kadhal Pagadai (1996) as himself (episode 6)
