= Aasai =

1995 Indian film by Vasanth

- Theatrical release poster
- Directed by: Vasanth
- Written by: Vasanth
- Produced by: Mani Ratnam; S. Sriram
- Starring: Ajith Kumar; Suvaluxmi; Prakash Raj
- Cinematography: Jeeva
- Edited by: B. Lenin; V. T. Vijayan
- Music by: Deva
- Production company: Aalayam Productions
- Release date: 9 September 1995
- Running time: 144 minutes
- Country: India
- Language: Tamil
- Box office: est. ₹5 crore

Aasai (transl. Desire) is a 1995 Indian Tamil-language romantic thriller film, written and directed by Vasanth. The film stars Ajith Kumar, Suvaluxmi and Prakash Raj, with Rohini, Poornam Viswanathan, Nizhalgal Ravi, and Vadivelu in supporting roles. It revolves around an army major lusting for his sister-in-law, and attempting to ruin her relationship with her lover.

Aasai was produced by Mani Ratnam and S. Sriram via Aalayam Productions. Set and shot in Madras and Delhi, it was photographed by Jeeva and edited by B. Lenin and V. T. Vijayan, while Deva composed the music. The film, released on 9 September 1995, became a commercial success and Ajith's first major breakthrough. It won three Tamil Nadu State Film Awards, including Best Director (Vasanth). The film was remade in Hindi as Pyaar Zindagi Hai (2001).

== Plot ==
Saraswathi "Yamuna", the younger daughter of an Orthodox father, comes to Madras to finish her studies. Major Madhavan, the husband of Yamuna's elder sister Ganga, is infatuated with Yamuna after seeing her photo in a letter she sent. Meanwhile, Yamuna meets Jeevanantham "Jeeva" on a bus, who gives her his ticket because she had not taken her own. Later, Jeeva decides to express his love to Yamuna by writing a letter but disposes of it after seeing a boy who did the same being beaten up. Yamuna finds the letter and realises his love.

One day, when they are walking together, Jeeva tries to remove dirt from Yamuna's eyes and ends up kissing her. Yamuna is angry with him. Jeeva senses it, gets wet in the rain, and gets a cold. Hearing this, Yamuna meets him. Jeeva says she is his only medicine and he needs her. Yamuna promises she will marry him. On Yamuna's birthday, Jeeva jumps into her house and presents her with a puppy. One day, fearing Yamuna's father might not marry Yamuna to Jeeva, Jeeva decides to marry her at a registry office. However, Yamuna refuses, and Jeeva leaves.

Meanwhile, Madhavan settles his father-in-law's debts and earns his trust. He also pays to connect a landline to Yamuna's house and talks to her regularly, but Ganga is unaware. One day, Ganga finds it and starts to realize his true identity. Madhavan then reveals his love affair with Yamuna to his wife. This makes her so upset that she tries to go live with her father and Yamuna. Madhavan imprisons her in the house. One day he tells her she can go to her father's house by flight and tricks her by making her drink a glass of milk laced with sleeping pills, as a result of which she falls unconscious. Madhavan then murders Ganga by suffocating her to death with a polythene cover and tying it around her head with his shoelace. He lies to everyone that she died from a heart attack. He then makes Yamuna and her father stay with him in Delhi to look after his baby, but he has other plans.

Jeeva comes to Delhi. One day he sees Yamuna, who ignores him. Later, he sees her carrying the puppy and asks why she needs it when she does not need him. Yamuna leaves the puppy in the middle of the road. Later that night, Yamuna comes to take the puppy in the rain. Jeeva sees this and realises she really loves him. Two months later, Yamuna's father decides to get her married to Jeeva; Madhavan decides to stop the marriage. Yamuna's family meets Jeeva in a restaurant. While Jeeva talks to Madhavan, he takes advantage of a careless Sikh and dashes against him, causing Jeeva to lose his balance. In the melee, Madhavan steals Jeeva's purse. When Jeeva senses his purse missing, he confronts the Sikh and humiliates himself, exactly as Madhavan anticipated. Later, he suspects Madhavan and wants to frisk him. This angers Yamuna's father, who blindly believes Madhavan.

Madhavan later gives Jeeva his flight ticket and wants to send him to Madras, but Jeeva foils Madhavan by tearing the ticket and spending the day with Yamuna. Enraged, Madhavan drenches his baby in the rain and calls Yamuna to look for it. Later, Madhavan arranges for some men to pour liquor into Jeeva's mouth and lay him in the middle of the road, leading Yamuna and her father to believe that Jeeva is a drunkard. Yamuna's father boasts that he has the divine gift to discern good versus bad people at sight; with that "gift", he declares Jeeva a bad person. Meanwhile, Jeeva complains to Lt. Col Hariharan, a friend of Madhavan, who does not believe him. Later, when celebrating Holi, Madhavan asks Jeeva about the puppy. Jeeva gives it, but Madhavan kills the puppy and frames Jeeva. An argument ensues between them; Madhavan tries to kill Jeeva with a rod, but stops when Yamuna pleads with him.

Hariharan eventually realises the truth about Madhavan and tells him to stop. Instead, Madhavan kills Hariharan, staging it as a car accident. Madhavan plants narcotics in Jeeva's pillows and tips off the police, leading to Jeeva's arrest. While meeting Jeeva in prison, Madhavan boastfully reveals the truth to Jeeva about how he killed Ganga to get Yamuna. Yamuna overhears this and informs her father. Her father wails in agony for his murdered older daughter and his folly and poor judgment. They plan to escape, but Madhavan arrives, knocks out Yamuna's father, and holds Yamuna prisoner in his house. Jeeva escapes from prison and arrives there. A fight ensues between Madhavan and Jeeva, where Jeeva triumphs and Madhavan is knocked out. Yamuna and Jeeva take the baby to the hospital, as it has fainted.

Yamuna's father awakens, locks the doors, and opens the gas cylinder. When Madhavan too awakens, the father threatens to light a match to avenge his daughter and repay Madhavan for his evil deeds. Madhavan's histrionics and pleadings fall on deaf ears. Yamuna's father casually lights the matchstick, causing a deadly explosion that kills both Madhavan and himself. Jeeva is exonerated and unites with Yamuna and the baby.

== Cast ==
- Ajith Kumar as Jeevanantham "Jeeva"
- Suvaluxmi as Saraswathi (Yamuna)
- Prakash Raj as Major Madhavan
- Rohini as Ganga
- Poornam Viswanathan as Yamuna's father
- Nizhalgal Ravi as Lt. Col Hariharan
- Vadivelu as Jeeva's friend
- Pooja Batra (special appearance in the song "Shock Adikuthu Sona")
- Veeraraghavan as Yamuna's father's friend
- Bayilvan Ranganathan as Army Officer
- Dhamu as Jeeva's friend
- Mahanadi Shankar as Moneylender
- Daljit Singh as Sardar
- Kutty Anand (special appearance in the song "Shock Adikuthu Sona")
- S. J. Suryah as Auto Driver (uncredited)

== Production ==
=== Development ===
Vasanth wanted to make a "family thriller" with a powerful villain not usually seen in Tamil films; the story of Aasai evolved from this. Poovellam Kettupaar, Deva and Kanne were the working titles during the film's production but Vasanth chose Aasai as the title because it was about both the protagonist and antagonist. In creating the antagonist, Vasanth took inspiration from Rajinikanth's character from Avargal (1977) and Vijayan's character in Uthiripookkal (1979). The film was produced by Mani Ratnam and S. Sriram via Aalayam Productions. Cinematography was handled by Jeeva, and editing by B. Lenin and V. T. Vijayan.

=== Casting ===
The lead role of Jeevanantham was initially offered by Vasanth to actor Sivakumar's son Saravanan (later known as Suriya), to make his debut but he declined, citing a lack of interest in an acting career. Ajith Kumar was instead cast after Vasanth and co-producer S. Sriram saw him in a dhoti advertisement on Doordarshan. Actor Suresh dubbed Ajith's voice. For the antagonist Major Madhavan, Vasanth considered Manoj K. Jayan as one of the actors but he felt the role needed someone else, he chose Prakash Raj after he was recommended by his mentor K. Balachander. Vasanth cast Suvaluxmi as Saraswathi / Yamuna after seeing her performance in the Bengali film Uttoran and he wanted "someone who had an innocent face and could make the audience believe the gullibility of the character". Vasanth based Yamuna's father, played by Poornam Viswanathan, on his own father who had a tendency to trust the wrong people. Film News Anandan filmed scenes which did not make the final cut.

=== Filming ===
Vasanth chose the Delhi backdrop because Prakash Raj's character had to be "far away from the heroine's place" and the team shot in the early mornings during their Delhi schedule as the director was "obsessive about onlookers not being part of the frame". The film's military parade scene was filmed at the Madras branch of the Officers Training Academy after giving an assurance that the character of Madhavan had a "blemishless professional record".

== Soundtrack ==
The music was composed by Deva. He was chosen to compose the music because the director and composer had previously collaborated on Doordarshan shows. To get the right music, Deva and Vasanth had pre-recording sessions to finalise the orchestration and sound of the songs. U. Srinivas played the mandolin portions in the song "Pulveli Pulveli". The song "Meenamma" is based on "Mama" by the British band Genesis, and "Thiloththama" is inspired by the Israeli singer Ofra Haza's version of "Galbi".

Track listing
No.	Title	Lyrics	Singer(s)	Length
1.	"Konja Naal Poru Thalaivaa"	Vaali	Hariharan	5:10
2.	"Meenamma"	Vaali	P. Unnikrishnan, Anuradha Sriram	5:32
3.	"Shock Adikuthu Sona"	Vaali	Suresh Peters, G. V. Prakash Kumar	5:42
4.	"Pulveli Pulveli"	Vairamuthu	K. S. Chithra, P. Unnikrishnan	6:26
5.	"Pulveli Pulveli" (male)	Vairamuthu	P. Unnikrishnan	6:36
6.	"Thiloththama"	Vairamuthu	S. P. Balasubrahmanyam, Swarnalatha	5:44
Total length:				35:10

== Release and reception ==
Aasai was released on 9 September 1995. Ananda Vikatan, in a review dated 1 October 1995, rated the film 41 out of 100, with particular praise for Prakash Raj's performance and Deva's music. R. P. R. of Kalki wrote without any Amman dance, mother, father sentiment, action, lengthy dialogue, here comes a film after a long time that that sticks in the mind forever; the plot had an opportunity to turn vulgar, but the cursed things were deftly avoided as the director is completely focused on the finesse of carving out the characters. D. S. Ramanujam of The Hindu wrote, "The movie has the mould of a foreign film and the situations the director has webbed, prolong the suspense and tension in the right dosage to the end." The film became a major success and Ajith's first major breakthrough. It went on to win in three categories at the Tamil Nadu State Film Awards: Best Director (Vasanth), Best Music Director (Deva) and Best Male Playback Singer (Hariharan). The film was later remade in Hindi as Pyaar Zindagi Hai (2001).

== Bibliography ==
- Dhananjayan, G. (2011). The Best of Tamil Cinema, 1931 to 2010: 1977–2010. Galatta Media. OCLC 733724281.
