= Thalapathi (soundtrack) =

- Cassette cover

Soundtrack album by Ilaiyaraaja
- Released: 23 April 1991
- Genre: Feature film soundtrack
- Language: Tamil
- Label: Lahari Music
- Producer: Ilaiyaraaja

Thalapathi is the soundtrack album composed by Ilaiyaraaja, with lyrics written by Vaali, for 1991 Indian Tamil-language film of the same name which was written and directed by Mani Ratnam, and produced by G. Venkateswaran. The film stars Rajinikanth and Mammootty with Arvind Swamy in his feature-film debut. It was the last collaboration between Ilaiyaraaja, Vaali and Ratnam as the latter had associated with A. R. Rahman and Vairamuthu for all of his projects, beginning with Roja (1992), which marked Rahman's debut.

== Development ==
According to cinematographer Santosh Sivan, Ilaiyaraaja finished composing the entire soundtrack in "half a day". This is the first film for which Ratnam chose to use stereophonic music. The first song to be composed for the film was "Chinna Thayaval", although Ilaiyaraaja had given the tune of "Putham Puthu Poo" to Ratnam much earlier. "Chinna Thayaval" is set in Charukesi, a Carnatic raga, and "Putham Puthu Poo" is set in Hamsanandi. The recording of "Sundari Kannal", which is set in Kalyani, took place in Mumbai (then known as Bombay) with R. D. Burman's orchestra. The picturisation of the song was heavily inspired from the book Ponniyin Selvan written by Kalki Krishnamurthy. The song "Rakkamma Kaiya Thattu" was conceived and composed to introduce the character Subbulaxmi onscreen. It is set in Abheri, and at the insistence of Ratnam, Vaali incorporated the devotional song "Kunitha Puruvamum" into this. "Yamunai Aatrile" is set in Yamunakalyani. The Bhogi-themed "Margazhithan" was inspired by Tamil folk music. The film's audio rights were sold to Lahari Music for ₹7.2 million (equivalent to ₹62 million or US$640,000 in 2023), then a record price.

== Track listing ==
All lyrics are written by Vaalee; all music is composed by Ilaiyaraaja.

Tamil
| No. | Title | Singer(s) | Length |
|---|---|---|---|
| 1. | "Yamunai Aatrile" | Mitali Banerjee Bhawmik | 1:22 |
| 2. | "Rakkamma Kaiya Thattu" | S. P. Balasubrahmanyam, Swarnalatha | 7:10 |
| 3. | "Sundari Kannal" | S. P. Balasubrahmanyam, S. Janaki | 7:14 |
| 4. | "Kaattukuyilu Manasukkulae" | K. J. Yesudas, S. P. Balasubrahmanyam | 5:32 |
| 5. | "Putham Puthu Poo" | K. J. Yesudas, S. Janaki | 5:00 |
| 6. | "Chinna Thayaval" | S. Janaki | 3:23 |
| 7. | "Margazhithan" | S. P. Balasubrahmanyam, Swarnalatha, Chorus | 2:39 |

All lyrics are written by P. K. Mishra; all music is composed by Ilaiyaraaja.

Hindi
| No. | Title | Singer(s) | Length |
|---|---|---|---|
| 1. | "Yamuna Kinare" | Sadhana Sargam | 1:22 |
| 2. | "Jaaneman Aaja Aaja" | Kumar Sanu, Sadhana Sargam | 7:10 |
| 3. | "Sundari Yeh Jeevan Tera" | Suresh Wadkar, Sadhana Sargam | 7:14 |
| 4. | "In Aankhon Ka Tu Tara" (Version 1) | Kavitha Krishnamurthy | 5:32 |
| 5. | "In Aankhon Ka Tu Tara" (Version 2) | Kavitha Krishnamurti | 3:23 |
| 6. | "Aayi Holi" | Udit Narayan, Abhijeet Bhattacharya | 2:39 |

All lyrics are written by Rajasri; all music is composed by Ilaiyaraaja.

Telugu
| No. | Title | Singer(s) | Length |
|---|---|---|---|
| 1. | "Yamuna Thatilo" | Swarnalatha | 1:22 |
| 2. | "Chilakamma Chitikeyanga" | S. P. Balasubrahmanyam, K. S. Chithra | 7:10 |
| 3. | "Sundari Nuvve" | S. P. Balasubrahmanyam, K. S. Chithra | 7:14 |
| 4. | "Singarala" | K. J. Yesudas, S. P. Balasubrahmanyam | 5:32 |
| 5. | "Mudda Banthi Puvvulo" | Mano, Swarnalatha | 5:00 |
| 6. | "Ada Janmaku" | P. Susheela | 3:23 |

All music is composed by Ilaiyaraaja.

Kannada
| No. | Title | Singer(s) | Length |
|---|---|---|---|
| 1. | "Kogilege Haadu Antha" | Ramesh Chandra, Akbar Y. E. | 5:22 |
| 2. | "Hey Rukkamma Kaiyatattu" | Akbar Y. E., Vedika, Shashikala Sunil | 6:42 |
| 3. | "Hocha Husa Hoo" | Ramesh Chandra, Shashikala Sunil | 4:59 |
| 4. | "Sundari Ninnaseya Hele" | Akbar Y. E., Shashikala Sunil | 6:40 |
| 5. | "Putta Thayiya Kandana" | Shashikala Sunil | 2:53 |
| 6. | "Margashira" | Harsha Uppar, Vinay K. N., Shashikala Sunil | 2:37 |

== Release history ==
The original Tamil version of the soundtrack album features seven songs and was released on 23 April 1991. The Hindi-dubbed version Dalapathi has six songs, which were written by P. K. Mishra and released on Saregama. The Telugu-dubbed version, which was distributed by Aditya Music, features lyrics penned by Rajasri. Lahari Music released the Kannada-dubbed version of the film's soundtrack which was titled Nanna Dalapathi, and V. Nagendra Prasad penned its lyrics.

== Reception ==
N. Krishnaswamy of The Indian Express criticised the incorporation of "Kunitha Puruvamum" into "Rakkamma Kaiya Thattu", saying, "Beside this verse that has survived more than fourteen hundred years, how utterly pedestrian and absolutely base [Ilaiyaraaja's] song sounds. And how blasphemous and philistine it looks when the profound and the profane are juxtaposed with total disregard to cultural values". The review board of Ananda Vikatan praised Ilaiyaraaja's music, particularly "Rakkamma Kaiya Thattu".

== In popular culture ==
The soundtrack was included in The Guardian's list of "1000 Albums to Hear Before You Die". "Rakkamma Kaiya Thattu" was placed fourth among the songs listed in a BBC list of "World Top Ten Popular Songs of All-time". The song was included in the 2012 Hindi film Agent Vinod, and Lahari sued that film's producer Saif Ali Khan for using the song without permission. "Rakkamma Kaiya Thattu" was adapted in Hindi by Anand–Milind as "Tu Tu Tu Tu Tara" for Bol Radha Bol (1992). Rapper M.I.A. sampled the beats used in the chorus of "Kaattukuyilu" for her song "Bamboo Banga" from the album Kala (2007). "Yamunai Aatrile" was reused in '96 (2018); this version was sung by Chinmayi.

== Bibliography ==
- Ramachandran, Naman (2014) [2012]. Rajinikanth: The Definitive Biography. New Delhi: Penguin Books. ISBN 978-0-14-342111-5.
- Rangan, Baradwaj (2012). Conversations with Mani Ratnam. India: Penguin Books. ISBN 978-0-670-08520-0.
- Sundararaman (2007) [2005]. Raga Chintamani: A Guide to Carnatic Ragas Through Tamil Film Music (2nd ed.). Pichhamal Chintamani. OCLC 295034757.
