= GV Films =

Indian film company

- Type: Film production Film distribution
- Industry: Entertainment
- Founded: 1989
- Founder: G. Venkateswaran
- Headquarters: Chennai, India
- Products: Motion pictures (Tamil)

GV Films is an Indian film production and distribution company in headed by Ishari K. Ganesh. The firm had been a leading production studio in the Tamil film industry in the 1990s and had been founded by G. Venkateswaran as Sujatha Films in 1986.

== History ==
=== Film industry ===
Sujatha Films was set up in 1986 by G. Venkateswaran, a chartered accountant, as a film production and distribution company. Operating as a family production house, Venkateswaran's brother Mani Ratnam also often assisted on the production work of films that he directed for the studio. Sujatha Films became GV Films as it became the first publicly listed company from the Indian media industry in 1989.

The early films by the studio saw frequent collaborations with Mani Ratnam and Visu, as well as with composer A. R. Rahman. Films including Anjali and Thalapathi were among the studio's most notable films.

GV Films produced Suhasini Maniratnam's first film Indira (1995) featuring Anu Hasan and Arvind Swamy in the lead roles. The film did not perform well at the box office, prompting GV Films to stop production and prioritise distribution ventures. However, some distribution ventures including Aalavandhan (2001) and Baba (2002) were also expensive failures.

GV Films made a return to production in the early 2000s, first working on the making of Thamizhan (2002) directed by debutant Majith. The film featured Vijay and Priyanka Chopra in her first acting role. Further films that the studio worked on included Vasanth's Yai! Nee Romba Azhaga Irukke! (2002) and K. Bhagyaraj's Chokka Thangam (2003) with Vijayakanth. All three films did not perform well commercially. Subsequently, Venkateswaran came under pressure from film financiers. In April 2003, Venkateswaran committed suicide at his residence in Chennai.

Following Venkateswaran's death, the studio continued to produce media content under the same name. Notably, actress Manisha Koirala was briefly a board member as the studio attempted to make a comeback through Hindi film content and 3D television serials. The studio launched a big budget Hindi film directed by Mahesh Manjrekar starring Sanjay Dutt in late 2005, though it was later stalled. Kasthuri Shankar also worked with the studio and assisted on the oversight of the production of Urchagam (2007). The studio returned to prioritising distribution ventures and instead chose to make small budget films such as Kaivantha Kalai (2006) and Thirudi (2006). In 2015, GV Films held a ceremony in Mumbai to mark 25 years since its founding.

=== Other ventures ===
In 1993, GV Films worked on bringing Michael Jackson to India for two live concerts to be held in Bombay and Madras on 8 and 10 December in aid of the Rajiv Gandhi Foundation. The event was later cancelled prompting the studio to suffer heavy losses and begin litigation.

In 2000, GV Films paid $43.6 million to acquire about 8,000 international titles from a seller's offshore investment company Pinewood Films. This included the masters for non-exclusive internet, DVD and theatrical rights. The deal was considered the biggest catalogue buyout by an Indian company. During the same period, GV Films entered into a joint venture with UK internet portal Asian Online.

As of 2020, the group of companies is headed by Ishari K. Ganesh.

== Filmography ==
=== Film production ===
as Sujatha Films

Title	Year	Director	Cast	Synopsis	Ref.
Mouna Ragam	1986	Mani Ratnam	Mohan, Revathi, Karthik		
Agni Natchathiram	1988	Mani Ratnam	Prabhu, Karthik, Amala		

as GV Films

Title	Year	Director	Cast	Notes	Ref.
Vedikkai En Vadikkai	1990	Visu	Visu, S. Ve. Sekhar, Ravi Raghavendra		
Anjali	1990	Mani Ratnam	Shamili, Raghuvaran, Revathi		
Thalapathi	1991	Mani Ratnam	Rajinikanth, Mammootty, Arvind Swamy		
Neenga Nalla Irukkanum	1992	Visu	Nizhalgal Ravi, Bhanupriya, Visu		
May Maadham	1994	Venus Balu	Vineeth, Sonali Kulkarni, Manorama		
Indira	1995	Suhasini	Anu Hasan, Arvind Swamy, Nassar		
Thamizhan	2002	Majith	Vijay, Priyanka Chopra, Ashish Vidyarthi		
Yai! Nee Romba Azhaga Irukke!	2002	Vasanth	Shaam, Sneha, Rajiv Krishna		
Chokka Thangam	2003	K. Bhagyaraj	Vijayakanth, Soundarya, Prakash Raj		
Ullam Ketkumae	2005	Jeeva	Shaam, Arya, Laila, Asin, Pooja		
Matichya Chuli	2006	Atul Kale-Sudesh Manjrekar	Sudhir Joshi, Vandana Gupte, Ankush Choudhary	Marathi film	
Kaivantha Kalai	2006	Pandiarajan	Prithvi Rajan, Sruthi, Pandiarajan		
Thirudi	2006	K. Shankar	Kathir, Dhanya Mary Varghese		
Urchagam	2007	Ravichandran	Nandha, Sherin, Dinesh Lamba		
TN 07 AL 4777	2009	A. Lakshmikanthan	Pasupathy, Ajmal, Simran		

=== Film distribution ===
In addition to the production of films since 2010, GV Films has also been involved in distributing films of other production houses across certain regions.

- Aalavandhan (2001)
- Baba (2002)
- Vettaiyaadu Vilaiyaadu (2006)
- Vallavan (2006)
- Thaamirabharani (2007)
- Sivaji (2007)

=== Television ===
- Mayavi (Jaya TV)
