= Suneeta Rao =

Background information
- Genres: Pop; Indipop
- Occupation: Singer
- Instrument: Vocalist
- Years active: 1989–present
- Labels: Gramophone Company India/Saregama; BMG Music; Sony Music
- Website: Official site

Suneeta Rao is an Indian pop singer, playback singer, dancer and stage actress, popular for her songs sung in the 1980s and 1990s. Her most famous song is Paree Hoon Main from the album Dhuan (1991).

== Early life and career ==
Suneeta Rao was born in Germany in a Telugu speaking family. Her father Dr DK Rao hailed from Krishna district Andhra Pradesh while her mother Komala Sista Rao hailed from West Godavari. She has two siblings Sister Aarti Rao and brother Narsimha Rao. She completed her schooling in Mumbai and higher studies at St. Xavier's College, Mumbai. During and after college, she acted in many plays such as Evita and musicals such as They're Playing Our Song and Greased Lightning.

== Singing and stage career ==
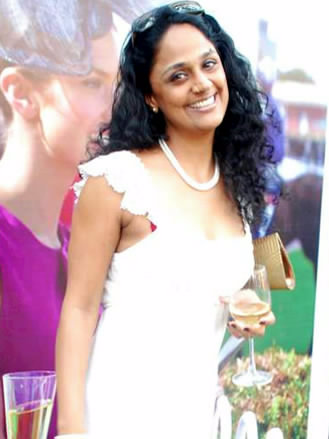
Rao in 2012

Rao started her career with the song Suneeta Senorita in 1989. She became popular with the song "Paree Hoon main".

She released a Hindi pop album entitled Dhuan in 1991 with Gramophone Company India, which sold over 75,000 copies, with music by Lesle Lewis. The song and video of "Paree" from the album made Suneeta Rao a household name, leading the press to affectionately crown her the "Paree of the Masses".

Her early association with A. R. Rahman was "Adi Paru Mangatha", from the 1994 Tamil film May Madham. She released a Hindi pop album entitled Talaash in 1999 with Gramophone Company India, with music by Ranjit Barot.

Two videos that hit the screen were for the songs "Dehka Dehka" and "Kesariya", two folksy upbeat tracks that reinstated Rao at the top of the charts. She then released a new single and music video entitled "Chhoti Chhoti Baatein" as part of the Magnasound album A Reason To Smile on the occasion of 50 years of Indian Independence. She also featured in a group song in the album called "Wajah Muskurane Ki".

Besides going platinum, all the above albums were at the top of the Hindi music charts. Her album Ab Ke Baras has lilting, sensuous, joyous music that blends traditional folk music with modern production values.

Her career includes songs from films like Ghulam-e-Mustafa, Dulhan Hum Le Jayenge and Kahin Pyar Na Ho Jaye. Suneeta Rao also has shows in Pakistan and Africa in the offing, as well as several other projects for television, theatre and films.

She performed for NDTV in 2008.

Rao wrote and recorded an anthem song for global warming. This was for a campaign initiated by the ICAI and GYAAN called "Planet alert". The song launched the campaign in a radiothon that was aired from 5 June 2009 on BIG 92.7 FM! The song was produced by Dhruv Ghanekar, and sung by Rao.

Rao launched her new album Waqt on 15 July 2008 at the Hard Rock Cafe. These Raag-based contemporary songs were composed by Rao, with music arranged by Nexus, DJ Gaurav Issar and Dudul Saikia. The CDs were available in stores under the Crescendo Music label. The first video was of the song "Sun Zara", a song for the Girl Child, supported by the UNFPA, to address the issue of sex-selection. The video was directed by Rachel Reuben, shot by Jason West, and stars Suneeta Rao and leading actress Suchitra Pillai.

Suneeta Rao gave 12 performances in the NDTV Imagine reality show Dhoom Macha De and received the runner up award for the "Dhoom final stopper". In 2005, she acted in an Off-Broadway play in New York called Sidd.

== Personal life ==
Rao is married to Jason West, a cinematographer based in Mumbai. She is actively involved and is the spokesperson of an initiative called Laadli, organized by an NGO called Population First, started by her uncle, Bobby Sista, whose main agenda is "Saving the Girl Child", population control and other social movements in India.

== Discography ==
- Senorita (1989)
- Dhuan (1991)
- Talaash (1996)
- Choti Choti Batein - Single (1997)
- Ab Ke Baras (2000)
- Mujhe Pyar Ho Gaya - Single (2001)
- Waqt (2008)
- Vaada Karo - Single (2018)
- Dekha Tujhe To Dil Remake (2020)

=== Film and television songs ===
==== Hindi ====
Year	Film	Song(s)	Composer	Co-singer(s)	Notes
1989	Kahan Hai Kanoon	"One By One Koi Bhi Aaye, One By One Kadam Milaye"	Bappi Lahiri	Bappi Lahiri	
1993	Game	"Zindagi Hai Game"	Anand–Milind		
1994	Teesra Kaun	"Dekha Tujhe Toh Dil Gaane Laga"	Anand–Milind	Bali Brahmbhatt	
1994	Sangdil Sanam	"Le Le Mera"	Anand–Milind		
1995	Swabhimaan	"Ek Pal"			
1995	Ahankaar	"Nasha Nasha"	Anu Malik		
1995	Ram Shastra	"Chak Lange"	Anu Malik	Gurdas Mann	
1996	Ek Tha Raja	"Mere Khwabowale Raja"	Anand–Milind		
1996	Sapoot	"Catch Me If You Can"	Anu Malik		
1997	Ghulam-E-Musthafa	"Sara Shehar Aaj Jaagega"	Amar Haldipur		
1997	Gupt: The Hidden Truth	"Duniya Hasino Ka Mela"	Viju Shah	Udit Narayan	
1997	Loha	"Door Na Jao Jee"	Tabun		
1998	Angaaray	"Rangila"	Anu Malik	Anu Malik	
1999	Kaala Samrajya	"Koi Hai Diwana Dil Me Kisi Ke Dil Me Hai Masti"	Anand–Milind	Arun Bakshi	
1999	Laawaris	"Kuchh Hamare Pas Hain"	Rajesh Roshan	Jolly Mukherjee, Shankar Mahadevan	
2000	Dulhan Hum Le Jayenge	"Dulhan Hum Le Jayenge"	Himesh Reshammiya	Kumar Sanu, Alka Yagnik	
2000	Kahin Pyaar Na Ho Jaaye	"Aa Meri Life Bana De"	Himesh Reshammiya	Kamaal Khan	
2001	Asoka	"O Re Kanchi"	Anu Malik	Shaan, Alka Yagnik	

==== Telugu ====
Year	Film	Song(s)	Composer	Co-singer(s)	Lyricist	Notes
1998	Hrudayanjali	"Achampeta Mangatha"	A. R. Rahman	Anupama, T. K. Kala, G. V. Prakash Kumar	Vennelakanti	Dubbed version of May Maadham
2001	Bava Nachadu	"Bang Bang"	M. M. Keeravani	Shankar Mahadevan	Sirivennela Seetarama Sastry	
2001	Anandam	"Oka Merupu"	Devi Sri Prasad		Potula Ravikiran	
2002	Holi	"Chamaku Chamak"	R. P. Patnaik		Kulasekhar	
2004	Varsham	"Nachave Nizam Pori"	Devi Sri Prasad	Adnan Sami	Sirivennela Seetarama Sastry	

==== Tamil ====
Year	Film	Song(s)	Composer	Co-singer(s)	Lyricist	Notes
1994	May Maadham	"Achampeta Mangatha"	A. R. Rahman	T. K. Kala, G. V. Prakash Kumar	Vairamuthu	
2002	Samurai	"Adidadi Appatha"	Harris Jayaraj	Vadivukkarasi	Vairamuthu	
