= Dinesh Lamba =

Indian film actor

- Born: Jambuda, Gujarat, India
- Occupation: actor/producer/director
- Years active: 2002-Present

Dinesh Lamba is an Indian actor mainly acting in Bollywood. He is primarily seen in supporting roles and has appeared in over 60 Hindi and Tamil films and several television commercials.

== Filmography ==
=== Hindi films ===
Year	Film	Role	Notes
2002	Mohabbat Ho Gayi Hai Tumse		
2003	Samay: When Time Strikes	Sub Inspector Rafique	
2003	Waisa Bhi Hota Hai Part II	Sunil	
2004	Ab Tak Chhappan	Rafique Sulaiman, gangster	
2004	Aan: Men at Work		
2004	Aitraaz		
2004	Jaago		
2004	Masti		
2005	Page 3		
2005	Go	PA to CM	
2005	Mumbai Xpress	Johnson	
2005	Main Aisa Hi Hoon	Indraneel's friend	
2005	Naina	Villager	
2005	D	Dinesh	
2005	Mangal Pandey: The Rising	Bearer	
2005	Mr Ya Miss		
2005	Sarkar		
2006	Shaadi Se Pehle	Lucky Local	
2006	Shiva	Hawaldar Atmaran Bhende	
2006	Vivah	Munim-ji	
2006	Phir Hera Pheri		
2006	Mohabbat Ho Gayi Hai Tumse		
2008	Mumbai Meri Jaan	Scooter Owner	
2008	Maan Gaye Mughal-e-Azam		
2008	Karzzz	Kabira's man	
2009	Daddy Cool		
2010	Fired	Khalid	
2011	Bin Bulaye Baraati	Havaldar	
2017	Humein Haq Chahiye Haq Se		

=== Tamil films ===
Year	Film	Role
2007	Urchagam	Nicholas
2010	Thottupaar	
2012	Billa II	Praveen Kumar
2023	Leo	DFO
2026	Draupathi 2	

=== Other language films ===
Year	Film	Role	Language
2001	Maiyar Ma Mandu Nathi Lagtu	Gordada-Brahmin	Gujarati
2022	BaagadBillaa	Fakir	Gujarati
2023	Samara		Malayalam
