= May Maadham =

1994 film directed by Venus Balu

- Theatrical release poster
- Directed by: Venus Balu
- Written by: Venus Balu; Crazy Mohan (dialogues)
- Produced by: G. Venkateswaran
- Starring: Vineeth; Sonali Kulkarni
- Cinematography: P. C. Sreeram
- Edited by: B. Lenin; V. T. Vijayan
- Music by: A. R. Rahman
- Production company: GV Films
- Release date: 9 September 1994
- Country: India
- Language: Tamil

May Maadham (transl. The Month of May) is a 1994 Indian Tamil-language romantic musical film directed by Venus Balu, produced by G. Venkateswaran, and distributed by GV Films. The film stars Vineeth and Sonali Kulkarni, with music by A. R. Rahman. It is an uncredited remake of the 1953 Hollywood film Roman Holiday. The movie was released on 9 September 1994.

== Plot ==
Sandhya lives in Ooty with her overbearing father Rangarajan, a businessman and strict disciplinarian. Over Sandhya's objections, Rangarajan arranges her marriage to Rajesh Kumar, a non-resident Indian living in the United States. After finding out that Rajesh is bald and speaks with a stutter, a disgruntled Sandhya tricks him into buying her coconut water at a railway crossing, then flees by boarding a moving train as it crosses the road.

The train takes Sandhya to Madras Central, where a photographer named Eeshwar takes a photo of her walking through the station while testing his camera equipment. Sandhya's bag is stolen by a thief and mistakenly picked up by Eeshwar, who leaves the station with Sandhya in hot pursuit. Finding ₹1,000 (equivalent to ₹7,200 or US$77 in 2026) inside the bag, Eeshwar's young assistant steals it and spends it all at a party later that night. A now-penniless Sandhya confronts Eeshwar after the party and demands her money back. After Eeshwar's assistant admits to the theft, Eeshwar promises to pay her back to avoid arrest. He takes Sandhya to a hotel for a meal but slips away without paying, forcing Sandhya to work in the kitchen for the rest of the night to cover the bill.

The following day, Eeshwar is hired to do photography for a wedding. An enraged Sandhya shows up at the wedding, accuses him of theft, and destroys his roll of film, getting him fired and leaving him without any money. To repay her, Eeshwar sells his old, barely-functioning car, and directs the buyer to pay Sandhya before leaving.

A fashion studio later discovers the photo of Sandhya taken by Eeshwar at the train station and contacts Eeshwar's employer "All-in-All" Ayyasamy, offering money to bring her in for a photoshoot. Ayyasamy approaches Eeshwar with the offer, and Eeshwar sets off to find Sandhya. He finds her serving tea to locals, where she has made a circle of new friends, and persuades her to return to the fashion studio with him. When Sandhya notices a large cutout of her photo displayed in front of the studio, she panics, explaining to Eeshwar that her father is still looking for her and intends to force her to marry. As they approach the fashion studio, Sandhya spots her father Rangarajan inside and immediately drives away. With nowhere else to go, Eeshwar and Sandhya proceed to leave Madras.

Eeshwar takes Sandhya to the Shore Temple in Mahabalipuram and shows her a mouth-shaped opening in Krishna's Butterball, a large nearby rock. Eeshwar tells her that only those who are truthful can place their hand inside and safely withdraw it. After Sandhya is reluctant to place her hand inside, Eeshwar sticks his entire arm into the hole and startles Sandhya by pretending that his hand has been cut off. Sandhya and Eeshwar share a tender moment, and their relationship grows close over the course of the following day. That night, Sandhya musters up the courage to put her hand in the hole herself. However her arm becomes lodged in the opening and she panics, goes into shock and falls unconscious. A horrified Eeshwar rushes her to a nearby hospital.

As Eeshwar exits the hospital room, he finds Rangarajan waiting outside, and tells him that he has fallen in love with Sandhya. Rangarajan replies that Sandhya has a serious condition requiring costly medical treatment that only he can afford, and that once she recovers, he will allow her to marry Eeshwar. Eeshwar agrees, and Rangarajan takes a still-unconscious Sandhya home with him. The next day, however, Rangarajan quickly finalizes Sandhya's marriage to Rajesh. Rangarajan also sends a wedding invitation to Eeshwar, making it clear that he never intended to honor their agreement.

Devastated, Eeshwar is urged by his young assistant to seek the assistance of a local drunkard known as "the captain", a man who turned to heavy drinking after his own failed marriage. The captain agrees to help and flies Eeshwar to Sandhya's house by helicopter on the day of the wedding, landing directly in front of Sandhya and Rajesh as they prepare to exchange vows. Sandhya leaves Rajesh at the mandapa and embraces Eeshwar, who confronts Rangarajan, accuses him of going back on his word, and quickly ties a mangalasutra around Sandhya's neck. An enraged Rangarajan draws a revolver and points it at Eeshwar, but Rajesh steps forward, lowers Rangarajan's hand, and admonishes him to let Sandhya be with the man she loves. The film ends with Eeshwar and Sandhya flying away in the helicopter, and subsequently celebrating their marriage back in Eeshwar's neighborhood.

== Cast ==
- Vineeth as Eeshwar
- Sonali Kulkarni as Sandhya
- Manorama as Aandal
- Kaka Radhakrishnan as Sadha Sivam
- Janagaraj as Captain
- R. Sundarrajan as "All-in-All" Ayyasamy
- P. C. Ramakrishna as Rangarajan
- Rajeshkumar as Rajesh Kumar
- Pandu as a police constable
- Anand Krishnamoorthi as Thirugnana Sambanthan
- Oru Viral Krishna Rao as a colony resident
- Madhan Bob as Ramasamy
- S. N. Lakshmi as Sandhya's grandmother
- Sathyapriya as a female pimp
- Pasi Sathya as Poongodi
- Marthandan as a mad-man
- Vellai Subbaiah as a customer
- Jaya Prahasam as Gurusamy
- Mounika in a special appearance in the song "Aadipaaru Mangatha"
- Silk Smitha in a special appearance in the song "Palakattu Machanukku"

== Production ==
Ajith Kumar and Khushbu were initially considered to play the lead roles before Vineeth and Sonali Kulkarni were cast. The film was Kulkarni's second acting credit, and remains her only Tamil-language film to date. She was encouraged to audition for the role by Mani Ratnam, and accepted the part after traveling to Chennai for her audition. Parts of the song "Madrasa Suthi" were filmed in Marina Beach, along the coast of Chennai.

== Soundtrack ==
The film's soundtrack was composed by A. R. Rahman, with lyrics penned by Vairamuthu. Rahman initially considered including a rap song in the soundtrack, at a time when the genre was still emerging in India, but ultimately scrapped it, feeling it did not suit the overall score. The song "Margazhi Poove" is set in the Hindolam ragam, while "Enmel Vizhundha Mazhaithuli" is set in the Kāpi ragam.

In a 2018 interview, Vairamuthu recalled that after he had completed most of the lyrics for "Margazhi Poove", Rahman asked him to write additional lyrics for "a short tune that plays between the BGM". Vairamuthu initially considered the task impossible, but did so at Rahman's insistence, writing an abbreviated set of lyrics for the scene.

Rahman later re-used much of the soundtrack for May Maadham in the 2022 Hindi film Love You Hamesha, the soundtrack of which was released in 2001.

Tamil
No.	Title	Singer(s)	Length
1.	"Aadi Paaru Mangaathaa"	Suneeta Rao, T. K. Kala and G. V. Prakash Kumar	04:26
2.	"Paalakkaattu Machchaanukku"	G. V. Prakash Kumar, Noel James, A. R. Rahman (backing vocals)	04:37
3.	"Maarghazhi Poove"	Shobha Shankar, Chorus	06:18
4.	"En Mel Vizhundha"	P. Jayachandran, K. S. Chithra	05:05
5.	"Madraasai Suththip paakka"	Shahul Hameed, Swarnalatha, G. V. Prakash Kumar and Manorama	04:51
6.	"Minnalae"	S. P. Balasubrahmanyam	05:37

Telugu
No.	Title	Lyrics	Singer(s)	Length
1.	"Achampeta Mangatha"	Vennelakanti	Anupama, Suneeta Rao, T. K. Kala and G. V. Prakash Kumar	04:26
2.	"Madarasu Chuttivaste"	Ghantasala Ratnakumar	Srinivas, Swarnalatha, G. V. Prakash Kumar, Noel David, Malgudi Subha	04:51
3.	"Maanasa Veena"	Sirivennela Seetarama Sastry	K. S. Chithra, chorus	06:18
4.	"Edapai Jarina"	Sirivennela Seetharama Sastry	K. S. Chithra, Unnikrishnan	05:05
5.	"Palakollu Mavayya"	Bhuvana Chandra	G. V. Prakash Kumar, Gopal Rao	04:37

== Release and reception ==
May Maadham was released on 9 September 1994. Malini Mannath of The Indian Express gave the film a positive review, writing that "Despite its flaws, May Maadham is an engaging little film that is worth viewing". Thulasi of Kalki appreciated the film for P.C. Sreeram's cinematography, A.R. Rahman's music, Mohan's dialogues and the performances of the cast.

Despite the positive reviews, the film was commercially unsuccessful, and proved to be a financial setback for the production company GV Films, which had earlier produced back-to-back box office successes in Anjali and Thalapathi. In 1998, the film was dubbed in Telugu under the title Hrudayanjali. Prior to the film's release, the film's soundtrack was well received.
