= D. Imman =

Indian musician and score composer (born 1983)

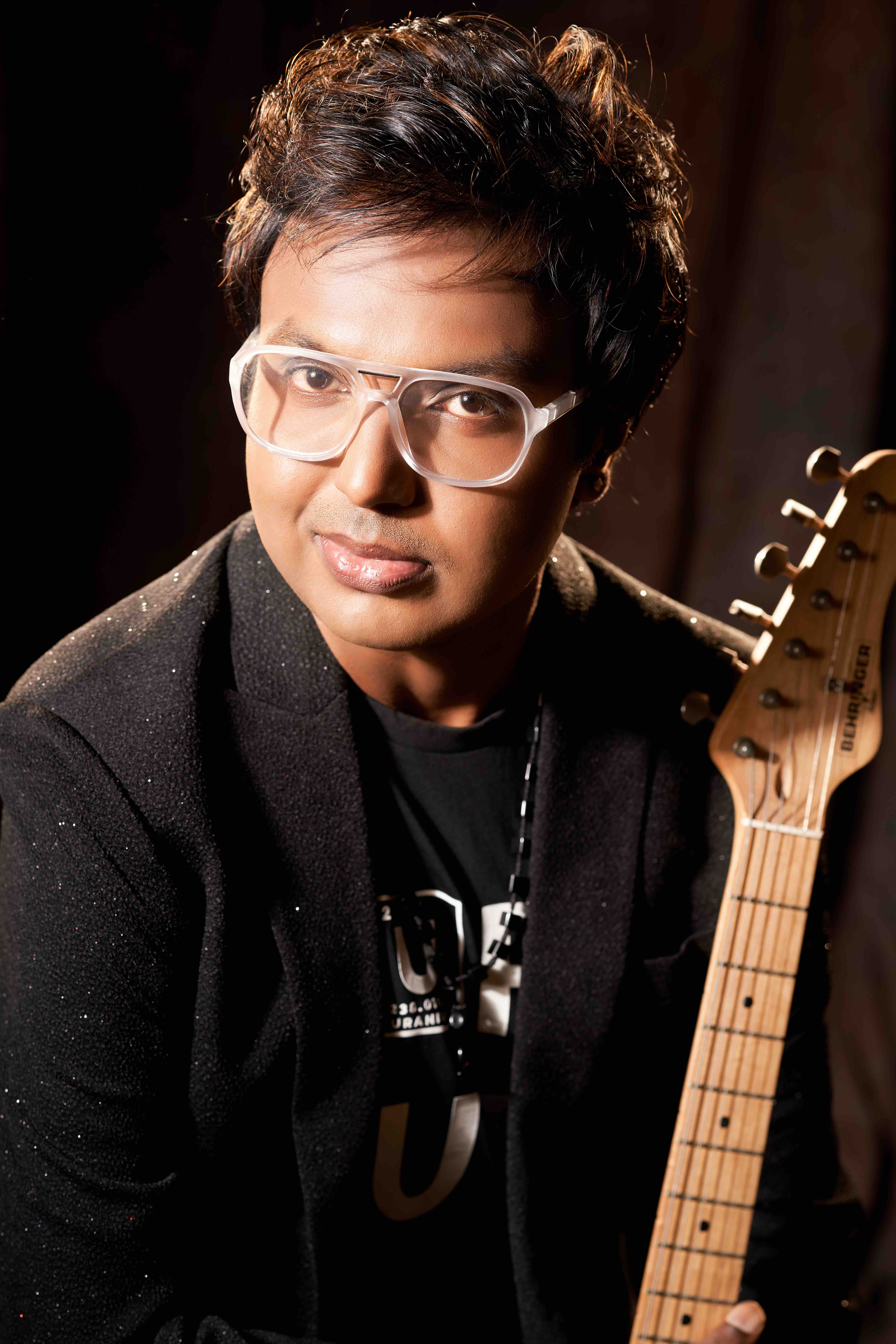

Background information
- Born: Immanuel Vasanth Dinakaran; 24 January 1983 (age 43); Chennai, Tamil Nadu, India
- Genres: Film score, soundtrack
- Occupations: Composer, record producer, music director, arranger, playback singer
- Instruments: Vocals, guitar, flute, percussion, drums, harpejji, continuum fingerboard, keyboard, piano
- Years active: 2002–present

Immanuel Vasanth Dinakaran (born 24 January 1983), better known as D. Imman, is an Indian music composer and singer, who predominantly works in Tamil cinema. His first film as music director was Thamizhan in 2002. Since then he has composed music for more than 100 films. He is the fifth Tamil music composer to win the National Film Award for Best Music Direction. He has also won the Filmfare Awards South and he has received 4 Filmfare Awards South nominations. He has also won 1 Tamil Nadu State Film Award, 2 Vijay Awards, 1 Edison Award, 1 Ananda Vikadan Cinema Award and 1 Zee Tamil Award. D. Imman is appointed as the Ambassador for Tamil Chair in University Of Toronto, Canada (2019).

== Career ==
Imman began work on music for films aged 15, apprenticing under music composers Mahesh Mahadevan and Adithyan by playing the keyboard. During this period, his work was noticed by television serial producer Kutty Padmini, who gave him the opportunity to work on the theme song and background music for the drama Krishnadasi, which began running in 2000. He subsequently began to get further work in the television circuit, garnering opportunities to score music for Kolangal, Police Diary and Mandhira Vaasal. Kutty Padmini then gave him the chance to score music and compose songs for his first feature film, Kaadhale Swasam, a romantic film featuring Karthik and Meena. Producer Venkateswaran, was impressed with Imman's work in the album, and gave him the opportunity to compose the music for Thamizhan (2002). The album won positive reviews, with the composer also featuring the voices of the lead actors Vijay and Priyanka Chopra for a particular song.

The success of individual songs such as "Azhagiya Asura" from Whistle (2003) made him popular. His next album was for Sundar C's masala film starring Arjun, Giri (2004), with the song Dai Kaiyaa Vechukittu being well received with the town and rural audiences.

The positive reviews that his work in Prabhu Solomon's Mynaa (2010) received, coupled with the film's box office success prompted bigger offers for Imman. He has subsequently collaborated with Prabhu Solomon for the rest of his trilogy of romantic films, earning acclaim for his work in Kumki (2012) and Kayal (2014). Similarly he has struck a similar successful combination with director Suseenthiran, winning positive reviews for his work on Pandianadu (2013) and Jeeva (2014). He teamed up with Actor Vijay again for Jilla (2014). Imman is the composer of Ajithkumar, Nayanthara starrer blockbuster Viswasam (2019). He also worked as a music composer for several films with Actor Sivakarthikeyan (Manam Kothi Paravai, Varuthapadatha Valibar Sangam, Rajinimurugan, Seemaraja, and Namma Veettu Pillai). Also he worked as a music composer for Annaatthe collaborating with Rajinikanth for the first time.

== Filmography ==
Year	Film	Role	Notes
2006	Kovai Brothers	Himself	Cameo appearance in the song "Ulagathula"
2006	Nenjil	Himself	Cameo appearance in the song "Nenjil"

== Awards & nominations ==
D.Imman has received several awards and recognitions for his work in the South Indian film musical world. He has been awarded the Kalaimamani award by the Government of Indian state Tamil Nadu in 2021.

Film	Awards	Category	Result	Ref
Mynaa	5th Vijay Awards	Best Music Director	Nominated	
Kumki	Ananda Vikatan Cinema Awards 2013	Best Music Director	Won	
Kumki	The Chennai Times Film Awards 2013	Best Music Director	Nominated	
Kumki	Edison Awards 2013	Best Music Director	Won	
Kumki	60th Filmfare Awards South	Best Music Director – Tamil	Won	
Kumki	60th Filmfare Awards South	Best Male Playback Singer – Tamil for "Onnum Puriyale"	Nominated	
Kumki	Mirchi Music Awards South 2013	Song of the Year for "Ayayayo Aananthamey"	Won	
Kumki	Mirchi Music Awards South 2013	Song of the Year for "Solitaley"	Nominated	
Kumki	Mirchi Music Awards South 2013	Album of the Year	Won	
Kumki	Mirchi Music Awards South 2013	Music Composer of the Year for "A Lady and the Violin"	Nominated	
Kumki	Mirchi Music Awards South 2013	Music Composer of the Year for "Solitaley"	Won	
Kumki	Mirchi Music Awards South 2013	Song of the Year – Listener's choice for "Solitaley"	Won	
Kumki	Norway Tamil Film Festival Awards 2013	Best Music Director	Won	
Kumki	2nd SIIMA Awards	Best Music Director – Tamil	Nominated	
Kumki	Tamil Nadu State Film Awards 2017	Best Music Director	Won	
Kumki	7th Vijay Awards	Best Music Director	Won	
Kumki	7th Vijay Awards	Vijay Award for Favourite Song for "Solitaley"	Nominated'	
Rummy	4th SIIMA Awards	Best Music Director	Nominated	
Kotigobba 2	Mirchi Music Awards South 2017	Song of the Year Kannada for "Saaluthillave"	Won	
Kotigobba 2	Mirchi Music Awards South 2021	Song of the Decade - Kannada for "Saaluthillave"	Won	
Viswasam	67th National Film Awards	Best Music Director	Won	
Viswasam	9th SIIMA Awards	Best Music Director – Tamil	Won	
Viswasam	Zee Cine Awards Tamil 2020	Favourite Music Director	Won	
Viswasam	Norway Tamil Film Festival Awards 2020	Best Music Director	Won	
Viswasam	Edison Awards 2020	Best Music Director	Nominated	
Annaatthe	67th Filmfare Awards South	Best Music Director	Nominated	
