= T. K. Kala =

Indian playback singer

- Occupations: Playback singer, actress
- Years active: 1972–1985; 1991–present

T. K. Kala is an Indian playback singer who sings in Tamil, Kannada and Telugu languages. Kala is also an actress who plays supporting roles in Tamil films and voice actor. She received the Kalaimamani award in 2006. She is the daughter of actress Shanmugasundari.

== Career ==
Born to actress Shanmugasundari, Kala was trained in music and was frequently choice for songs featuring child actors. Her major breakthrough came when she was noticed by A P Nagarajan and made her singing debut in the film "Agathiyar" with the song "Thaayir sirandha kovilum illai". She made her acting debut portraying Prakash Raj's mother in Ghilli (2004).

== Discography ==
=== Tamil ===
Year	Film	Song title	Music director	Co-singer
1972	Agathiyar	Thaayir Chirandha	Kunnakudi Vaidyanathan	
1973	Rajapart Rangadurai	Vanthaen Vandhanam	M. S. Viswanathan	T. M. Soundararajan & K. Veeramani
1975	Ingeyum Manithargal	Aaraaro Aaraaro Aarudhal	T. S. Naresh	M. K. Muthu
1975	Melnaattu Marumagal	Pallandu Pallandu	Kunnakudi Vaidyanathan	Vani Jairam
1975	Melnaattu Marumagal	Kalaimagal Kai	Kunnakudi Vaidyanathan	Vani Jairam
1975	Pallandu Vazhga	Poivaa Nadhi Alaiye	K. V. Mahadevan	K. J. Yesudas
1975	Uravukku Kai Koduppom	Thiruvennum Peyarukku Uriyavale	D. B. Ramachandra & S. P. Venkatesh	P. Susheela & P. Madhuri
1976	Dasavatharam	Hari Narayana Ennum Naamam	S. Rajeswara Rao	
1976	Dasavatharam	Iranyaya Namaga	S. Rajeswara Rao	Y. G. Mahendran
1976	Dasavatharam	Thaniyaayo Sinam	S. Rajeswara Rao	
1976	Oru Oodhappu Kan Simittugiradhu	Murukko Kai Murukku	V. Dakshinamoorthy	
1976	Uzhaikkum Karangal	Vaaren Vazhi Paarthirupene	M. S. Viswanathan	T. M. Soundararajan
1976	Vaayillaa Poochchi	Aasai Thaan Nenjin	M. S. Viswanathan	A. L. Raghavan & B. S. Sasirekha
1977	Nandha En Nila	Oru Kaadhal Saamrajyam	V. Dakshinamoorthy	P. Jayachandran
1977	Palabishegham	Kundril Aadum Kumarunukku Aragarogara	Shankar–Ganesh	Krishnamoorthy & S. C. Krishnan
1977	Palabishegham	Padam Edukkira Paambu Pole	Shankar–Ganesh	S. C. Krishnan
1978	En Kelvikku Enna Bathil	Ore Vaanam	M. S. Viswanathan	B. S Sasirekha
1978	Thanga Rangan	Enga Rangan Thanga Rangan	M. S. Viswanathan	T. M. Soundararajan
1979	Pappathi	Kalli Mara Kaattula Kanni Vachen	Shankar–Ganesh	T. L. Maharajan
1979	Raja Rajeswari	En Kannin Maniye	Shankar–Ganesh	S. P. Balasubrahmanyam
1980	Mazhalai Pattalam	Gumthalakkadi Gumma	M. S. Viswanathan	Master Raj, L. R. Anjali, B. S. Sasirekha & S. P. Sailaja
1980	Oru Marathu Paravaigal	Mottu Malli	Shankar–Ganesh	Manorama
1981	Jadhikkoru Needhi	Ondru Sernthu	Shankar–Ganesh	T. M. Soundararajan
1982	Sparisam	Rajagopala Ungamma	Ravi	B. S. Sasirekha & Murali
1984	Pillaiyar	Kallaathaanaa Nee Kadavul Illaiyaa	Soolamangalam Rajalakshmi	
1985	Raman Sreeraman	Aiyaa Aiyaa Aiyaiyaa	Sivaji Raja	Malaysia Vasudevan
1991	Saajan	Kaathal Thi Vasamaneen	Nadeem–Shravan	D. L. Murli
1991	Saajan	Yenthan Nenchil	Nadeem–Shravan	Kumar Sanu
1991	Saajan	Nenchil Vanthir	Nadeem–Shravan	
1991	Saajan	Yen Paavalane	Nadeem–Shravan	
1991	Saajan	Nila Vennila	Nadeem–Shravan	Kumar Sanu
1992	Deewana	Mengai Polave	Nadeem–Shravan	Vinod Rathod
1992	Deewana	Raatiree Vellai 1	Nadeem–Shravan	Arun Ingle
1992	Deewana	Maane Vaa	Nadeem–Shravan	Arun Ingle
1992	Deewana	Poongodiye	Nadeem–Shravan	Arun Ingle
1992	Deewana	Raatiree Vellai 2	Nadeem–Shravan	Arun Ingle
1992	Amaran	Abhyam Krishna Naragaasuran	Adithyan	Sirkazhi G. Sivachidambaram
1993	Kizhakku Cheemayile	Edhukku Pondatti	A. R. Rahman	Shahul Hameed & Sunandha
1994	Duet	Kulicha Kutralam	A. R. Rahman	S. P. Balasubrahmanyam
1994	Karuththamma	Araro Ariraro	A. R. Rahman	Theni Kunjarammal & Deepan Chakravarthy
1994	May Madham	Adi Paru Mangatha	A. R. Rahman	Suneeta Rao & G. V. Prakash Kumar
1995	Maman Magal	Maman Magale	Adithyan	Malaysia Vasudevan, Mano & Aditya Narayan
1996	Summa Irunga Machan	Maama Maama Idhu Sun TV	Deva	Sindhu
1998	Maru Malarchi	Rettaikili	S. A. Rajkumar	Swarnalatha & Mansoor Ali Khan
1999	Taj Mahal	Sengathe	A. R. Rahman	
2000	Ennamma Kannu	Naan Oru Pombala Rajini	Deva	Anuradha Sriram
2000	Sandhitha Velai	Chinna Ponnu	Deva	
2006	Sivappathigaram	Poranthiruchu Kaalam	Vidyasagar	Saindhavi & Jayamoorthy

=== Other language ===
Year	Film	Language	Song title	Music director	Co-singer
1980	Makkala Sainya	Kannada	Dhimma Thakka Dhimmi	M. S. Viswanathan	Master Raj, L. R. Anjali, B. S. Sasirekha & S. P. Sailaja
1991	Saajan (D)	Kannada	Yendendu Erali Preeti	Nadeem–Shravan	Anil Kiran
1991	Saajan (D)	Kannada	Nanna Manasu	Nadeem–Shravan	Kumar Sanu
1991	Saajan (D)	Kannada	Yee Kavithyu Naa	Nadeem–Shravan	
1991	Saajan (D)	Kannada	Anuraga Pallavige	Nadeem–Shravan	
1991	Saajan (D)	Kannada	Jeevisdli Hege	Nadeem–Shravan	Kumar Sanu
1991	Saajan (D)	Telugu	Chusanu Toleesari	Nadeem–Shravan	Anil Kiran
1991	Saajan (D)	Telugu	Na Manasu Mate	Nadeem–Shravan	Kumar Sanu
1991	Saajan (D)	Telugu	Nee Gayamlo	Nadeem–Shravan	Ninu
1991	Saajan (D)	Telugu	Nenu Tapasu Chesanu	Nadeem–Shravan	
1991	Saajan (D)	Telugu	Ella Bratakanu	Nadeem–Shravan	Kumar Sanu
1992	Deewana (D)	Kannada	Hosa Diganthadi	Nadeem–Shravan	Vinod Rathod
1992	Deewana (D)	Kannada	Guri Thappidha	Nadeem–Shravan	P. Balram
1992	Deewana (D)	Kannada	Priti Gilee	Nadeem–Shravan	P. Balram
1992	Deewana (D)	Kannada	Gaarudiya Ho Ho	Nadeem–Shravan	P. Balram
1992	Deewana (D)	Kannada	Koti Druvatare	Nadeem–Shravan	P. Balram
1992	Deewana (D)	Telugu	Pranaya Ragame	Nadeem–Shravan	Vinod Rathod
1992	Deewana (D)	Telugu	Chiru Navve	Nadeem–Shravan	Arun Ingle
1992	Deewana (D)	Telugu	Chali Kalla Lo	Nadeem–Shravan	Arun Ingle
1992	Deewana (D)	Telugu	O Chaliya	Nadeem–Shravan	Arun Ingle
1992	Deewana (D)	Telugu	Kori Kolichanu	Nadeem–Shravan	Arun Ingle
1994	Vanitha (D)	Telugu	Jo Laali Jo Laali	A. R. Rahman	Sarala
1994	Hrudayaanjali (D)	Telugu	Achampeta Mangatha	A. R. Rahman	Annupamaa, Suneeta Rao & G. V. Prakash Kumar
1994	Palnati Pourusham	Telugu	Idigo Peddapuram	A. R. Rahman	Mano & Sunandha

== Filmography ==
- Ghilli (2004)
- Kasthuri Maan (2005)
- Veyil (2006)
- Kuruvi (2008)
- Pirivom Santhippom (2008)
- Nee Unnai Arindhaal (2009)
- Maasilamani (2009)
- Magizhchi (2010)
- Aravaan (2012)
- Kaadu (2014)
- I (2015)

== Television ==
Year	Title	Network
2023 – 2024	Ethirneechal	Sun TV
2025 – 2026	Kanmani Anbudan	Star Vijay
