= Kee Mu =

- Directed by: Majith
- Written by: Majith
- Produced by: M. S. Yakobubeen
- Starring: Hassan; Sarika
- Cinematography: Ilavarasu Kadhaganesan
- Edited by: B. S. Vasu; S. Saleem
- Music by: Elango Kalaivanan (Songs); Sabesh–Murali (Score)
- Production company: Yako Films
- Release date: 5 September 2008
- Running time: 140 minutes
- Country: India
- Language: Tamil

Kee Mu (transl. B. C.) is a 2008 Indian Tamil-language romantic drama tragedy film directed by Majith. The film stars newcomers Hassan and Sarika, with Vadivelu, Charan Raj, Soori, Karthik Sabesh, Marks and Majith playing supporting roles. The film, produced by M. S. Yakobubeen, was released on 5 September 2008.

== Plot ==
The film begins with a disfigured Ramya (Sarika) living near a salt pan in Thoothukudi. Her father Bhavani (Charan Raj) and his henchmen then forcibly take her to the hospital in Chennai. From her hospital bed, she remembers her past.

Saravanan (Hassan) was a poor boy delivering mutton pieces throughout the city. Ramya, on the other hand, was a rich, spoiled brat and the daughter of the city bigwig Bhavani, a strict yet affectionate father. Saravanan and his three friends - Nethili Murugan (Soori), Sodhappal Sodalamuthu (Karthik Sabesh), and Ganesan (Marks) - were all from Thoothukudi and working to make ends meet in Chennai. Ramya, irritated by Saravanan for no particular reason, makes fun of him and teases him on multiple occasions. She even made Saravanan believe she was in love with him, and then the heartbroken Saravanan realized it was all acting. Ramya felt guilty for breaking Saravanan's heart, so she tried to apologize, but he kept avoiding her. One day, Ramya kissed Saravanan in public and confessed her love, and he fell in love with her.

When Bhavani got to know of his daughter's love, he decided to arrange his daughter's marriage as soon as possible. Ramya took a bundle of notes and her jewellery and fled from her home. She was still an underage girl, but in seven days, she would reach the legal age of majority and be able to marry Saravanan at the registrar's office. The couple, accompanied by the three friends, started travelling by bus from Courtallam to Thiruchendur. With the police's help, Bhavani and his henchmen eventually captured the couple in Kerala.

Ramya then convinced her father to marry Saravanan. Bhavani changed his mind for his daughter's happiness and finally accepted the marriage. In a twist of fate, Bhavani's henchman Kasi (Majith) killed Saravanan to save his boss's honour. Ramya then jumped into her lover's funeral pyre. She was saved, but the fire disfigured her face.

The film ends with Ramya returning to Thoothukudi to live with Saravanan's father, while Kasi has now become a lunatic.

== Cast ==
- Hassan as Saravanan
- Sarika as Ramya
- Vadivelu as Madasami
- Charan Raj as Bhavani
- Soori as Nethili Murugan
- Karthik Sabesh as Sodhappal Sodalamuthu
- Marks as Ganesan
- Majith as Kasi
- Thambi Ramaiah
- Halwa Vasu as Coconut Seller
- Bava Lakshmanan as Thief
- Subburaj as Thief
- Bonda Mani as Waiter
- Vijay Ganesh as Police Officer
- Chelladurai as Rice Shop Owner
- Vengal Rao as Fake Doctor
- Sangeetha Balan as Nethili Murugan's aunt
- Amirthalingam
- Rangamma Paatti
- Risha
- Anisha Narang

== Production ==
Director Majith, revealed that the film was based on a real life incident, and was shot where the real incidents took place. The film introduced Hassan and Sarika as the lead pair.

== Soundtrack ==
The soundtrack was composed by Elango Kalaivanan, in his debut.

Song	Singer(s)	Duration
"Puyalai"	Prasanna Rao	2:09
"Oru Mathiri"	Yugendran, Prashanthini	3:41
"Azhagana Pasangal Ellam"	Gopal Sharma, Manjunath, Rita	4:27
"Layilo Layilo"	Vijay Yesudas	5:01
"Kathal Sammatham"	Ranjith, Hema Ambika	4:28
"Sontha Bantha"	Pushpavanam Kuppusamy, Theni Kunjarammal	4:02

== Reception ==
Pavithra Srinivasan of Rediff.com gave 1.5 stars out of 5 for the film and said that it is "nothing more than a mock-glorified attempt at recreating Kaadhal".
