= Thamizhan =

2002 film by Majith

- Theatrical release poster
- Directed by: Majith
- Screenplay by: S. A. Chandrasekhar
- Story by: Majith
- Produced by: G. Venkateswaran
- Starring: Vijay; Priyanka Chopra
- Cinematography: N. K. Ekambaram
- Edited by: V. T. Vijayan
- Music by: D. Imman
- Production company: G. V. Films
- Release date: 12 April 2002
- Running time: 155 minutes
- Country: India
- Language: Tamil
- Budget: ₹4 crore

Thamizhan is a 2002 Indian Tamil-language action drama film directed by debutant Majith and produced by G. Venkateswaran. The film stars Vijay and Priyanka Chopra in the lead roles. This is Chopra's debut film, as well as her first and only Tamil film up to date. Revathi, Nassar, Ashish Vidyarthi and Vivek also play pivotal roles in the film, while the film's score and soundtrack were composed by another debutant D. Imman. The story involves solving several corruption cases by a lawyer named Surya in the process fighting against a criminal boss and finally making Indian law basics available as a free book to common people.

Thamizhan released on 12 April 2002, receiving mixed reviews but achieving commercial success at the box office.

== Plot ==
Surya is a happy-go-lucky guy who often gets involved in petty fights. He falls in love with Priya. His brother-in-law Sakthivel, a lawyer, advises him to work under senior lawyer Lakshminarayanan. Surya becomes an upright lawyer who values and tries to redress things legally. Meanwhile, Sakthivel is killed in the process of upholding justice by a corrupt bigwig GK. Surya takes up a mission to make the layman understand his legal rights and learn the Indian law basics. He is soon seen as a hero by the Indian people. GK's dairy factory gets sealed by Surya for violating food safety norms. Surya's sister Jaya also meets a pitiful end at the hands of GK's goons, but Surya refuses to give up. GK's goons start a riot in a village and put the blame on Surya. Surya is arrested and beaten up by the corrupt cops, and retaliates in return. He is summoned at the court and fights up legally, suggesting several reforms in the judicial system of India. After Surya gets released, GK attempts to shoot him but gets thrashed by the people. Surya tells GK to reform before he gets punished. For his service, Surya is honoured by the President of India. Finally, it is shown that Surya's dream had come true.

== Cast ==
- Vijay as Surya, future-lawyer
- Priyanka Chopra as Priya
- Nassar as N. Shakthivel, lawyer
- Revathi as Jaya, Surya's sister and Shakthivel's wife
- Vivek as Nandhakumar, Surya's friend
- Ashish Vidyarthi as G. K.
- Charuhasan as Sivaraman
- Poornam Viswanathan as Vishwanthan
- Vinu Chakravarthy as MLA Nachiyappan
- Delhi Ganesh as Advocate Lakshmi Narayanan
- Vincent Roy as DCP Muthuvel
- Vasu Vikram as Writer Govindhan
- M. S. Bhaskar as Conductor Ganesan

Uncredited

- Pasi Sathya as Villager
- Muthukaalai as a rickshaw driver
- Bayilvan Ranganathan as a visitor to Surya's office
- Siva Narayana Murthy as a visitor to Surya's office
- Besant Ravi as Henchman
- Sampath Ram as Henchman
- Nellai Siva as Train Ticket Collector
- Chelladurai as Train Ticket Collector
- Vellai Subbaiah as Train Ticket Collector
- S. Rajasekar as Moorthy
- Kovai Senthil as Estate worker
- Thadi Balaji as Sekhar, Surya's friend
- Vijay Ganesh as Estate worker
- Kaka Gopal as Aadisaamy
- Raneesh as Surya's friend

== Production ==
In August 2001, producer G. Venkateswaran signed on Thirupathisamy to direct Vijay in an action film titled Velan. The film, a remake of the director's Telugu film Azad, saw Priyanka Chopra, winner of the beauty pageant Miss World 2000, being brought in by Venkateswaran to make her debut and play the lead female role. However, before production began, Thirupathisamy died in an accident and Venkateswaran duly decided to give debutant Majith a chance to direct a film with the same cast. Filming began eventually in November 2001, shortly after the release of Vijay's previous romantic drama movie, Shahjahan and lasted until March 2002. To prepare for her role in the film, Priyanka watched Tamil films and tried to pick up a Tamil accent.

Gautami was initially selected to play Vijay's sister in the film, but was later replaced by Revathi. Vivek was signed on to film comedy scenes for a sum of ₹15 lakh. A new technical team of music director 18-year-old Imman, who had scored for serials earlier, and cinematographer Ekambaram, who had apprenticed with Jeeva, were also selected. Furthermore, the sets were designed by Sabu Cyril, dance choreography was by Raju Sundaram, and stunts were arranged by Super Subbarayan.

A scene for the film featured the producer and lyricist Vairamuthu making guest appearances as themselves during a book launch event. The patriotic nature of the film led to a postal stamp being released with Vijay's face on it. The similarities of title and release date between Thamizhan and the Prashanth-starrer Thamizh created confusion, with the producers of both films unable to accommodate any changes.

== Soundtrack ==
Thamizhan

Soundtrack album by D. Imman
- Released: 2002
- Genre: Feature film soundtrack
- Label: Star Music

D. Imman chronology
Thamizhan (2002)	Sena (2003)

The soundtrack of the film was composed by D. Imman, who made his debut at 19 years old. Priyanka Chopra sang a song in the film, with Vijay recommending her after he had heard her humming to a tune.

Track-list
No.	Title	Lyrics	Singer(s)	Length
1.	"Hot Party"	Vaali	Tippu, Mathangi	04:38
2.	"Lala Law Mudichom"	Vairamuthu	Shankar Mahadevan, Lavanya	05:09
3.	"Mattu Mattu"	Vairamuthu	D. Imman, Anuradha Sriram	05:03
4.	"Tamizha Tamizha"	Vairamuthu	Karthik	04:43
5.	"Ullathai Killathe"	Vairamuthu	Vijay, Priyanka Chopra	05:04
Total length:				24:37

== Release and reception ==
The film was released on 12 April 2002. Made on a high budget of ₹5 crore, Thamizhan was sold for ₹4.5 crore to distributors. Despite the film's success, India Today estimated it suffered a loss of ₹1.5 crore (equivalent to ₹6.0 crore or US$640,000 in 2026). The film was later dubbed in Telugu as Dammunte Kasko (2013).

Malathi Rangarajan of The Hindu praised Vijay's image change and claimed he acts out a "creditable portrayal", while adding that "dialogue is a strong point of the film". She further added "debutante Priyanka Chopra has precious little to do" and that Revathi's role was of a clichéd elder sister. Cinesouth wrote "Director Majid's bold attempt to make a film on this subject deserves standing ovation. Vijay's pavers are better utilized in stories like these than in helping 'unexpected' loves. This would probably make the theatres as well as the Justice departments to sit up & notice". In comparison, a reviewer from Bizhat.com stated that "the message conveyed leaves you exhausted and stressed", giving the film an average review. Ananda Vikatan rated the film 40 out of 100.

== Controversy ==
A case was filed in the Madras High Court to ban the film as they felt certain acts of Vijay's character portrayed lawyers in poor light.
