= Chokka Thangam =

- Theatrical release poster
- Directed by: K. Bhagyaraj
- Written by: K. Bhagyaraj
- Produced by: G. Venkateswaran
- Starring: Vijayakanth; Soundarya; Uma
- Cinematography: M. V. Panneerselvam
- Edited by: K. Mohankumar
- Music by: Deva
- Production company: GV Films
- Release date: 15 January 2003
- Running time: 160 minutes
- Country: India
- Language: Tamil

Chokka Thangam (transl. Pure gold) is a 2003 Indian Tamil-language drama film written and directed by K. Bhagyaraj and produced by G. Venkateswaran under the banner GV Films. It stars Vijayakanth, Soundarya and Uma in the lead roles, with Goundamani, Senthil, Prakash Raj and Swathi playing supporting roles. The background score and music were composed by Deva. The film was released on 15 January 2003.

== Plot ==
Muthu is a well-off owner of a traditional oil extraction mill who lives in a village with his younger sister, Maragatham, and their uncle (played by Goundermani). Having lost their parents at a young age, Muthu is extremely devoted to his sister and takes it upon himself to care for her. Together with his uncle, he actively searches for a suitable groom for Maragatham.

Pavalam is an orphan who arrives in the same village after the recent death of her father, an alcoholic. With nowhere else to go, she takes shelter in the home of her grandmother, who is a distant relative. By chance, Pavalam accompanies Muthu and Maragatham on a shopping trip, during which the three become acquainted. Impressed by Pavalam's outspoken and cheerful personality, Maragatham begins to see her as a perfect match for her brother.

As time passes, Muthu develops feelings for Pavalam, and she gradually reciprocates his affection. After Pavalam's grandmother passes away, she is left all alone. Taking advantage of her vulnerable situation, the local rowdy Periya Minor and his brother attempt to molest her. Muthu arrives just in time to rescue Pavalam and brings her home, strengthening the bond between them.

Meanwhile, Muthu succeeds in finding a suitable alliance for Maragatham. He chooses Sundaram, a kind-hearted man whom he once witnessed rescuing a poor woman from her abusive, drunken husband. After Muthu approaches Sundaram and his family, Maragatham and Sundaram are married. Sundaram belongs to a large joint family, where relatives play an influential role in every major family decision.

Soon after the marriage, Sundaram's family begins making arrangements for Muthu to marry Sundaram's sister, Gowri. It is then revealed that Gowri's earlier wedding had been called off after her fiancé died on the wedding day, leading the villagers to believe she is unlucky. Sundaram had intentionally searched for a groom who had a sister, hoping that both siblings could marry into each other's families. The marriage broker had deliberately concealed these details from Muthu, resulting in conflict and confusion.

Despite everything, Sundaram's family insists that Muthu marry Gowri. However, Muthu refuses because he is deeply in love with Pavalam. Offended by his decision, Sundaram's relatives force Maragatham to leave their home until Gowri is married, compelling her to return to Muthu's house.

Determined to resolve the situation, Muthu tirelessly searches for a suitable groom for Gowri, but every proposal ends in disappointment. He even approaches Akash's family with a marriage proposal, only to be rejected. During this period, Maragatham becomes pregnant. Understanding Muthu's predicament, Sundaram secretly continues to visit his wife despite opposition from his family. Eventually, Sundaram finds another groom for Gowri, and the wedding is arranged. Maragatham is welcomed back into her marital home, and the two families reconcile.

One day, Muthu rescues Akash and his family from a serious accident. Realizing Muthu's noble character despite having previously humiliated him, Akash's family begins to respect him. However, on the day of Gowri's wedding, it is discovered that the groom is a fraud who has been planted by the Minor brothers to trap Muthu. The groom reveals that the Minor brothers demand Pavalam in exchange for allowing the wedding to proceed. Otherwise, they threaten to cancel the wedding, once again ruining Gowri's future and putting Maragatham's married life at risk.

Muthu courageously confronts and fights the Minor brothers. As Gowri's wedding falls apart, Sundaram's relatives pressure Muthu into marrying Gowri instead. They claim that Pavalam can later be married to someone else from their acquaintance, all while keeping Sundaram unaware of their true intentions. To protect his sister's happiness and preserve her family, Muthu decides to sacrifice his own love and agrees to marry Gowri.

Before the wedding can take place, Gowri reveals everything to her brother, Sundaram. Furious upon learning the truth, Sundaram confronts his relatives and gains even greater respect for Muthu's selflessness. At the last moment, Akash and his family step forward and agree to the marriage. Akash and Gowri are finally married.

In the end, Muthu is reunited with Pavalam, and the two are married with the blessings of both families. The film concludes on a happy note, with both couples embarking on a new chapter of their lives together as husband and wife.

== Cast ==
- Vijayakanth as Muthu
- Soundarya as Pavalam
- Uma as Maragatham
- Goundamani as Muthu's uncle
- Senthil as Servant
- Prakash Raj as Sundharam
- Swathi as Gowri
- C. R. Saraswathi as Sundaram's cousin
- Sindhu as Sundharam's cousin
- Jaya Murali as Sundharam's mother
- S. S. Chandran as Sundharam's uncle
- Vinu Chakravarthy as Temple trustee
- Thyagu as Sindhu's husband
- T. P. Gajendran as C. R. Saraswathi's husband
- Ponnambalam as Periya Minor
- Besant Ravi as Chinna Minor
- B. V. Balaguru as Villager
- Sriman as Muthu's cousin
- Akash as Muthu's cousin
- Lekhasri as Sundari
- Usha Priya as Sundari's mother
- Pasi Sathya as Muthu's aunt
- Nellai Siva as Village Nattamai
- Chelladurai as Villager
- Kovai Senthil as Villager
- Idichapuli Selvaraj as Villager
- Tirupur Ramasamy as Villager
- Soundar as Abusing husband
- Kalidoss as Police inspector
- Mippu as Villager
- Lollu Sabha Soundarya as a mentally challenged woman

== Production ==
Soon after GV Films announced their collaboration with Vijayakanth, the producers approached Cheran to direct the film. However, due to issues concerning remuneration, K. Bhagyaraj eventually took on the role. Vidhya Venkatesh was originally approached for the role of Vijayakanth's sister, but since she was busy with Kalatpadai, she could not spare her dates and she was replaced by Uma. The filming was held at Pollachi for thirty days.

== Soundtrack ==
The soundtrack was composed by Deva.

Track listing
No.	Title	Lyrics	Singer(s)	Length
1.	"Enna Nenache"	R. V. Udayakumar	P. Unnikrishnan, Anuradha Sriram	4:51
2.	"En Jannal"	Pa. Vijay	Hariharan, Sadhana Sargam, Ganga Sitharasu	4:45
3.	"Ettu Jilla"	Pa. Vijay	Karthik, Anuradha Sriram, Unni Menon	4:41
4.	"Vellayai Manam"	Thamarai	Swarnalatha, P. Jayachandran, Sujatha Mohan	4:06
5.	"Oor Oora"	Snehan	S. P. Balasubrahmanyam	5:02
Total length:				23:25

== Critical reception ==
Malathi Rangarajan of The Hindu wrote "The film does have its plus points, yet somehow Bhagyaraj's magic touch in films [..] is definitely missing in 'Chokka Thangam.'" Krishna Chidambaram of Kalki wrote Bhagyaraj's touch was visible only in first half which goes away after interval and appears only in the film's end though he praised Vijayakanth as pure gold for following director's instructions but questioned why for this spineless character. He praised Uma's acting and song "Vellaiyai Manam" citing it has been a long time he heard a song with proper situation placement and concluded requesting Bhagyaraj to give retirement and send away colourful outfits of hero and white chariot in songs.

Malini Mannath of Chennai Online wrote "The director seems to have compromised for the sake of his hero’s image, there are more action-scenes than in a Vijaykant action-film, and the confusion is evident throughout. Talking of action, the chord tied to Vijaykant as he does the gravity-defying leap is clearly visible. The director’s heart was surely not in this film!". Sify wrote, "Bhagyaraj-Vijaykanth coming together in a rural backdrop had evoked a lot of interest among the audience, but unfortunately the duo could not create any magic and the film is totally disappointing. The story lacks any twist and punch associated with a Bhagyaraj film, as it is as old as the hills of Pollachi where it was shot".

== Box office ==
India Today estimated that the film suffered a loss of ₹1 crore (equivalent to ₹3.7 crore or US$380,000 in 2023). Venkateswaran blamed the losses on Vijayakanth not cutting his remuneration, while Vijayakanth noted the increase on outdoor expenses and cost of equipment.
