= Neenga Nalla Irukkanum =

1992 film directed by Visu

- Poster
- Directed by: Visu
- Written by: Visu
- Produced by: G. Venkateswaran
- Starring: Nizhalgal Ravi; Bhanupriya
- Cinematography: N. Balakrishnan
- Edited by: Ganesh Kumar
- Music by: M. S. Viswanathan
- Production company: GV Films
- Release date: 2 October 1992
- Country: India
- Language: Tamil
- Budget: ₹8.5 million (about 0.277 million USD) (Note: The exchange rate in 1992–93 was 30.64 Indian rupees (₹) per 1 US dollar (US$).)

Neenga Nalla Irukkanum (transl. You Should Live Long) is a 1992 Indian Tamil-language film written and directed by Visu. It stars Nizhalgal Ravi and Bhanupriya in the lead with Visu, Chandrasekhar and Manorama forming the supporting cast. Produced by G. Venkateswaran under his banner GV Films, the film won the award for Best Film on Other Social Issues at the 40th National Film Awards. The film was the first to be sponsored by the Tamil Nadu Government and had Jayalalithaa in a pivotal role as a Chief Minister (her real-life political profession at the time) in a brief appearance; making her unofficial comeback to films after a decade.

== Plot ==
Anjalai, a village woman marries a drunkard Manickam, with the hope of changing his behaviour post marriage. But Manickam continues drinking and goes to a level where he steals Anjalai's jewelry before losing his job. During this time, his mother dies in a fire accident after which he vows not to drink any more. Meanwhile, Manickam falls sick after damaging his liver as a result of excessive drinking. To safeguard his life, Anjalai collects money by begging in the streets and donation from the chief minister of the state. Manickam is sent to the United States for treatment. When the couple returns to India after Manickam gets cured, he starts drinking again and gets addicted to it. Unable to tolerate his change in behaviour, Anjalai ends her life. This forces all the women in the village to jointly launch a protest against alcohol.

== Cast ==
- Nizhalgal Ravi as Manickam
- Bhanupriya as Anjalai
- Visu
- Chandrasekhar
- Manorama
- Major Sundarrajan
- Srividya
- Jayalalithaa as herself (Chief Minister of Tamil Nadu)

== Production ==
Actress-turned politician Jayalalithaa who was the then Chief Minister of Tamil Nadu played herself in the film. This was also her final film as an actress.

== Soundtrack ==
Soundtrack was composed by M. S. Viswanathan and lyrics for all songs were written by Vaali.

- "Poongathu" – S. P. Balasubrahmanyam
- "Aasapattu" – S. P. Balasubrahmanyam
- "Mangalyam" – K. S. Chithra
- "Shivashankari" – K. S. Chithra
- "Varugiraar" – T. M. Soundararajan
- "Aalagi" – Malaysia Vasudevan, Swarnalatha

== Reception ==
Released on 2 October 1992, coinciding with Gandhi Jayanti, Neenga Nalla Irukkanum focused on Prohibition and was the first Tamil film to be sponsored by the Government of Tamil Nadu. The film was budgeted at a cost of ₹8.5 million (about US$ 0.277 million in 1992–93).

Despite being launched with much fanfare and media acclaim, the film did not make any impact among the audience as it turned out to be a box-office failure. It won the National Film Award for Best Film on Other Social Issues in 1993 and a Tamil Nadu State Film Award. The jury noted the film for its "effective and purposeful plea for prohibition". K. Vijiyan of New Straits Times wrote, "This is not the usual Visu fare we are used to [...] Visu has made sure this is not just an educational movie with an anti-alcohol message. There is an Indian saying that it is difficult to straighten a dog's tail and the story seems to subscribe to the fatalistic view that drunkards cannot quit". C. R. K. of Kalki expressed similar views. However Ayyappa Prasad for The Indian Express wrote that the film "fails to impress" and the "director in a bid to do propaganda-cum-commercial has ended up with a product that is neither".
