= Abdul Majith =

Indian film director

- Born: Abdul Majith; 20 February 1974 (age 52); Tirunelveli, Tamil Nadu
- Other names: Majith, Majeeth
- Occupations: Director, Producer, Screenwriter
- Years active: 1996-present

Abdul Majith (commonly known as Majith) is an Indian film director, producer screenwriter who has worked on Tamil films. He made his directorial debut with the 2002 social drama film, Thamizhan starring Vijay and Priyanka Chopra. He has since worked on lower budget ventures.

== Career ==
In 1996, he worked as the story writer for Selvaa. In 2001, producer G. Venkateswaran signed on Thirupathisamy to direct Vijay in an action film titled Velan. The film, a remake of the director's Telugu film Azad, saw Priyanka Chopra, winner of the beauty pageant Miss World 2000, being brought in by Venkateswaren to make her debut and play the lead female role. However, before production began, Thirupathisamy died in an accident and Venkateswaren duly decided to give debutant Majith a chance to direct a film with the same cast. A social drama, campaigning for the widespread knowledge of legal rights, the film created anticipation prior to release. The film opened to mixed reviews from film critics on 14 April 2002 and Malathi Rangarajan of The Hindu praised the film adding that "dialogue is a strong point of the film". The critic from Rediff.com also gave the film a positive review stating that the director had succeeded in making a good debut, while another critic labelled the film as "meaningful cinema" though stated that some scenes were overdone. In comparison, a reviewer from Bizhat.com stated that "the message conveyed leaves you exhausted and stressed", giving the film a below average review.

He began work on his second film, the thriller Thunichal in May 2005 and filming was completed by the end of the year, except for the dubbing portions. Subsequently, the film was postponed indefinitely due to financial restraints, and remained unreleased. The actors and director involved, moved on to participate with other projects. In 2008, he worked on the romantic drama Kee Mu, featuring newcomers. The film progressed with little publicity and had a low key release at the box office, while Majith also appeared in acting role. The film received negative reviews with a critic noting the film "copying one or two well-known trend-setters, seems nothing short of sacrilege when seen on screen". The success of Arun Vijay's Malai Malai, meant that the producers of Thunichal decided to use his new-found publicity to relaunch their own film. Arun Vijay, worried that the move could hamper his new-found image at the box office, lodged a complaint with the Nadigar Sangam, alleging that the producers of Thunichal were attempting to release the film without his voice. Soon after, he retracted his statements and refuted that the film would not damage his reputation. Upon release, the film received highly negative reviews. A reviewer from Behindwoods.com claimed in regard to the cast that "Arun Vijay seems to be in a lost plot after his Malai Malai high but that Ramana impressed with "his cold villainy" and the "other performances don’t count for much". The director was criticized, citing that "he fails to hold the viewers’ attention right from the start" and a "few interesting scenes which would have enhanced the quality of the film". Regarding the work from the technical crew, the reviewer cited that "there is nothing much that stands out", while the music by Premji Amaran "fails to make any sort of impact".

In 2016, he began production on Paisa, which is set in a slum. In February 2017, he began a female-centric thriller film titled Torchlight starring Anjali and Sadha.

== Filmography ==
- Note: he was credited as Majith till 2018.

Year	Title	Credited as			Notes
Year	Title	Director	Writer	Producer	Notes
1996	Selvaa	No	Story	No	
2002	Thamizhan	Yes	Story	No	
2008	Kee Mu	Yes	Yes	No	Also actor
2010	Thunichal	Yes	Yes	No	
2016	Paisa	Yes	Yes	Yes	
2018	Torchlight	Yes	Yes	Yes	
