= Fired (2010 film) =

- Directed by: Sajit Warrier
- Written by: Shripal Morakhia; Sajit Warrier
- Produced by: Shripal Morakhia; Ashish Bhatnagar
- Starring: Rahul Bose; Militza Radmilovic; Dinesh Lamba
- Edited by: Zealot (UK)
- Music by: Raju Singh
- Distributed by: IDream Productions
- Release date: 29 January 2010
- Running time: 90 minutes
- Country: India
- Language: Hindi

Fired is a 2010 Indian Hindi-language horror film starring Rahul Bose and Militza Radmilovic. It is the feature film debut of director Sajit Warrier and premiered at the Cannes Marché du Film on 12 May 2010.

== Plot ==
At the H.S.W.L HEAD OFFICE in LONDON England, the egotistical maniac Joy Mittal, the CEO of the company, decides to repair his scandal-ridden work record and prove to himself and his partners that he can, indeed, care for his family and be a competent leader in an economic meltdown which affects everyone. He is responsible for firing almost half the employees in London and implementing major cut-downs. In the turmoil that follows, he decides to sack the manager RUBY, a 29-year-old seductress with whom he has been having an affair which affects his personal and professional life. After a day of ultimate stress, Joy finally decides to finish off all his paperwork and stand proudly in front of his partners for a board meeting that will definitely change his life. The depiction of the horrific time spent by JOY at the empty office filled with the curse of people who have been recently fired is the crux of the film FIRED. It is a supernatural influence that keeps JOY haunted in his own empty office, and also the twin demons of PROZAC and insecurity which turn a happy go lucky man into a stark-raving suicidal guy. In a matter of a couple of hours, Joy turns into a pleading madman, seeing ghosts of his lover and her kid at every nook and corner. Everything around in the seemingly undistinguished office become the targets of his paranoia, fed by the crazy hallucinatory effects of his anti-depressant pills. FIRED is a real-time depiction of the last two hours in the life of a CEO who has recently fired almost half his employees, set in an empty office space, which also acts as a major character, enhancing the suspense of the film.

== Cast ==
- Rahul Bose as Joy Mittal
- Militza Radmilovic as Ruby Harmison
- Dinesh Lamba as Security Guard
- Naseer Abdullah as Mr. Kapoor

== Production ==
Fired was filmed in London, England. Due to depictions of nudity and some violence, the Indian Censor Board gave the film's promos an A rating which prevented them from being shown on television. The film has not been released theatrically because of these issues. Mumbai fashion designer Saisha Shinde designed the wardrobe for the film.
