= Tapassu =

1995 Telugu film by Bharath Parepalli

- Directed by: Bharath Parepalli
- Written by: Bharath Parepalli
- Produced by: Bharath Parepalli; C. S. Avadhani
- Starring: Bharath Parepalli; Krishna Bharati
- Music by: Raj–Koti
- Production company: Sruthilaya Unit
- Release date: 2 February 1995
- Country: India
- Language: Telugu

Tapassu (transl. Penance) is a 1995 Indian Telugu-language romantic drama film written, directed, and co-produced by Bharath Parepalli, who also played the lead role alongside Krishna Bharati. The film features music composed by Raj–Koti.

The film received acclaim for its music. The song "Talukumannadi Kulukula Tara," with lyrics by Vennelakanti and sung by Mano, remains popular decades after its release. Bharath Parepalli won the Nandi Award for Best Screenplay Writer for his work on the film. After the release of Tapassu, Bharath focused exclusively on directing.

== Cast ==
- Bharath Parepalli
- Krishna Bharati as Kiranmayi
- Bhaskar
- Roopa Devi
- Ramesh Kumar
- Banerjee
- Harish Goud

== Production ==
Bharath Parepalli, a protege of Dasari Narayana Rao, began his directorial career with Dr. Ambedkar in 1992. He followed this with films such as Boy Friend (1994) and Jantar Mantar (1994). For Tapassu, Bharath took on dual responsibilities as the film's director and lead actor. The film was produced under the Sruthilaya Unit banner. Tapassu was inspired by the 1993 Hindi film Darr.

== Music ==
The soundtrack of Tapassu was composed by Raj–Koti, with lyrics penned by Vennelakanti.

Track listing
No.	Title	Singer(s)	Length
1.	"Talukumannadi Kulukula Tara"	Mano	5:30
2.	"Mogadu Ragam"	Malgudi Subha	3:29
3.	"Muddulalo Tholi Muchatalo"	Murali, Renuka	4:48
4.	"O Naa Prema"	S. P. Balasubrahmanyam, K. S. Chithra	5:15
5.	"Oka Merupalle Merisavu"		2:15
6.	"College Adirinidi"	Koti	4:48
7.	"Nuvvante Nenani"	Mano, Renuka	5:02
Total length:			31:07
