= Torchlight (2018 film) =

Tamil-language drama thriller film directed by Abdul Majith

- Theatrical release poster
- Directed by: Abdul Majith
- Written by: Abdul Majith
- Produced by: Abdul Majith
- Starring: Sadha
- Cinematography: Sakthivel
- Music by: GV
- Production company: Confident Film Café
- Release date: 7 September 2018
- Running time: 127 minutes
- Country: India
- Language: Tamil

Torchlight is a 2018 Indian Tamil-language thriller film produced, written and directed by Abdul Majith. The film stars Sadha, Riythvika and Thirumurugan in the lead roles. The film is produced by the production banner Confident Film Café. The film is loosely based on 1970 Bollywood film Chetna and the plot is based on the true incidents which happened in the 1990s in the Tamil Nadu-Andhra highways. The film was launched in February 2017 and the principal photography of the film commenced on 23 February 2017. The film was theatrically released on 7 September 2018. It was also dubbed in Telugu as Srimathi 21F.

== Plot ==
The story revolves around a woman who has been forced to serve as a sex worker.

== Cast ==
- Sadha as Nilla
- Dinesh Kumar
- Varun Udhay
- Sivasakthi
- Riythvika as Kavitha
- Master Sujatha
- Thirumurugan
- A. Venkatesh
- C. Ranganathan
- A. L. Raja
- Saravana Sakthi
- Soodhu Kavvum Sivakumar
- Bava Lakshmanan as Zamindar
- Meghana R

== Production ==
The filmmakers announced the project in February 2017 and revealed that the film would be set on the prostitution and about the lives of women who miserably suffer while working in the streets. The film was set in the backdrop of the early 1980s and 1990s. Sadha was cast in the lead role and made her comeback into Tamil cinema after the 2015 film Eli. The first look poster of the film was unveiled by director Abdul Majith on 1 December 2017.

== Release ==
The film's release was delayed due to sanctions imposed by the Central Board of Film Certification (CBFC), resulting in approximately 87 cuts and an initial refusal to certify the film. Majith flew to Mumbai and cleared the censorship issue and the film received an A certificate from the CBFC. It was released on 7 September 2018.

== Reception ==
Maalai Malar appreciated the cast performances, especially Sadha's, and the background music and was mildly appreciative of the cinematography. Samayam was less positive, rating it 2.5 out of 5 stars.
