= Thunichal =

2010 Indian film

- Poster
- Directed by: Majith
- Written by: Majith
- Produced by: P. Kalidas
- Starring: Arun Vijay; Ramana; Shiva Munjal; Swathika
- Cinematography: Ilavarasu Sugatha Ganesan
- Edited by: M. S. Suriya
- Music by: Premji Amaran
- Production company: Sri Ambrishini Arts
- Release date: 1 January 2010
- Country: India
- Language: Tamil

Thunichal (transl. Bravado) is a 2010 Indian Tamil-language action thriller film written and directed by Majith. Starring Arun Vijay, Ramana, newcomer Shiva Manjal, and Swathika, the film was released on 1 January 2010, after many delays.

== Cast ==
- Arun Vijay as Shiva
- Ramana as Vinod
- Shiva Manjal as Sakthi
- Swathika as Priya
- Gangai Amaren
- K. Rajan
- Vaiyapuri as Film shooting assistant
- George Vishnu as Shiva's elder brother
- Lavanya as Sakthi's elder sister
- Singamuthu
- Halwa Vasu
- Bonda Mani
- Citizen Mani
- Kottachi

== Production ==
The shooting for Thunichal began in 2005, and ended in 2007. Subsequently, the film was scheduled to release in 2008 but did not after Arun Vijay did not dub for the film. Producer P. Kalidas filed a court case against Arun for delaying dubbing for the film. The court verdict was a hold on Arun's next film Maanja Velu (2010)'s release till Thunichal released.

== Soundtrack ==
The soundtrack was the first soundtrack composed by music director Premji Amaran, who during the postponement of the film, went on to become a popular actor. The film is one of two films—the other being Nenjathai Killadhe (2008)—that he worked outside the Chennai 600028 gang.

Thunichal

Soundtrack album by Premji Amaran
- Released: February 2, 2008
- Recorded: 2005
- Genre: World Music

Premji Amaran chronology
Thunichal (2008)	Nenjathai Killadhe (2008)

Track list
No.	Title	Singer(s)	Length
1.	"Kalapayalae"	Suchitra
2.	"Katikalama"	Karunas, Venkat Prabhu, Grace Karunas
3.	"Nadaswara"	Malathi, Kovai Kamala
4.	"Neer Vaanam"	Yugendran, Suchitra
5.	"Yezhu Vannamai"	Karthik, K. S. Chithra
6.	"Vaal Eduthal"	Yugendran
7.	"Paiyaa Paiyaa"	Vijay Yesudas, Chinmayi

== Release ==
The film had a low-key release on 1 January 2010, releasing only in 16 theaters.
