= Nee Unnai Arindhaal =

- Directed by: V. Rishiraj; Indian Bhaskar
- Written by: V. Rishiraj; Indian Bhaskar
- Produced by: Z. T. Choudhary
- Starring: Murali; V. Rishiraj; Kushi
- Cinematography: Sai Natraj
- Edited by: Shankarji
- Music by: R. K. Sundar
- Production company: 24 Frames Productions
- Release date: 3 July 2009
- Running time: 130 minutes
- Country: India
- Language: Tamil

Nee Unnai Arindhaal (transl. If you know yourself) is a 2009 Indian Tamil language drama film directed by V. Rishiraj and Indian Bhaskar. The film stars Murali, V. Rishiraj, and newcomer Kushi, while Risha, T. K. Kala, and Dhadha Muthukumar playing supporting roles. The film, produced by Z. T. Choudhary, was released on 3 July 2009.

== Plot ==
Sadai (V. Rishiraj) is an orphan who was adopted by Gopal's (Murali) mother (T. K. Kala) when he was a child, and she considers Sadai as her own son. Gopal and Sadai become best friends and work as rickshaw pullers. They live in a slum with Gopi's mother, who runs a roadside dosa business where the poor people can eat there for cheap. Although the two friends are both kind-hearted, Gopal is a soft person without any bad habits, whereas Sadai is a big brute who loves drinking alcohol and sleeping with prostitutes. Gopal has a cousin named Valli (Kushi), and they are in love with each other. They eventually get married, and Valli moves in Gopal's small house; thus, Gopal's mother and Sadai have to sleep in front of the house.

Gopal and his mother do not want to see Sadai being alone, so they decide to find him a wife. One day, they force Sadai to see a woman, who they choose for him to be married to, but the woman insults Sadai for being an ugly man and alcoholic. Gopal and his wife Valli reassure Sadai and swear to find him a better woman. Shortly after, Gopal's mother dies of a heart attack. Things get sticky when Valli gets pregnant as she finds that Sadai is having a bad influence on her husband. Valli complains to Gopal about Sadai's bad habits and tells him to stop hanging out with him, but Gopal refuses to follow his wife's instruction and tells her that his friend is more important than anything else.

Sadai wants to sleep with the beautiful prostitute Dashani (Risha), but he does not have enough money to pay her. Later, Gopal gives him his wife's ornaments to repair his rickshaw. Sadai then trades the jewels for money, but instead of repairing his vehicle, he pays Dashani to sleep with him. The big Sadai starts to hurt the little Dashani; thus, she refused to sleep with him, and she threw his money in his face. The heavily intoxicated Sadai then goes to Gopal's house, and Valli reluctantly welcomes him. Sadai assaults and brutally rapes Valli. She dies after the assault, and Sadai leaves the house. Gopal returns home after a hard day's work and discovers his wife's dead body. Gopal thought that she had committed suicide because he refused to follow her advice.

After the funeral, a neighbor reveals to Gopal that Sadai killed his wife, but Gopal refuses to believe him at first. One night, the neighbor curses Sadai for killing Valli. Sadai then kills him for being the only witness of the murder. The next day, the neighbor's dead body was found under a bridge. Gopal has had a suspicion that Sadai might have murdered his wife, so he decides to unearth his wife's corpse, and he finds Sadai's hair there. He is therefore heartbroken and mad with rage all at the same time. Later that night, Gopal finds an intoxicated Sadai in a chemical warehouse. Gopal beats Sadai up, disposes his body in a gallon barrel, and dissolves his body with nitric acid.

== Cast ==
- Murali as Gopal
- V. Rishiraj as Sadai
- Kushi as Valli
- Risha as Dashani
- T. K. Kala as Gopal's mother
- Dhadha Muthukumar as Muthu, Valli's father
- Indian Bhaskar
- Rail Ravi
- Master Sabari Priyan as Young Gopal
- Master Nirmal as Young Sadai

== Production ==
The film's title is based on the lyric "Nee Unnai Arindhaal" from the song "Unnai Arindhaal" from Vettaikkaran (1964). Murali signed to play the role of a rickshaw puller. Newcomer Kushi was chosen to play the female lead role, with V. Rishiraj, T. K. Kala, Dhadha Muthukumar, and T. Harikrishnan playing supporting roles. R. K. Sundar has scored the music for the lyrics jotted down by Indian Bhaskar. V. Rishiraj and Indian Bhaskar had written the story, screenplay and dialogues, and the latter is taking care of the stunts. Z. T. Choudhary produced the film under the banner 24 Frames Productions.

== Soundtrack ==
Nee Unnai Arindhaal

Soundtrack album by R. K. Sundar
- Released: 2009
- Recorded: 2009
- Genre: Feature film soundtrack
- Length: 25:34
- Producer: R. K. Sundar

The film score and the soundtrack were composed by R. K. Sundar. The soundtrack, released in 2009, features 6 tracks with lyrics written by Indian Bhaskar. Actor Narain and director Rama Narayanan attended the audio launch.

Track	Song	Singer(s)	Duration
1	"Vanthavarai Vaalavaikum"	Chandrakanth	4:21
2	"Daakku Daakku"	Indian Bhaskar	4:42
3	"Sonthama Jolikkiraal"	S. S. Kennedy, Sabeetha	4:07
4	"Otha Otha"	Rave Ravi, V. Rishiraj, Sathish	4:51
5	"Vaama Ponnu"	Krishnaraj	3:36
6	"Antha Naal"	Indian Bhaskar	3:57

== Reception ==
A reviewer from Dinamalar said, "Murali's underplayed performance in the title role is far better than V. Rishiraj over-the-top's acting" and added that the rest of the cast were apt but criticized the film's screenplay and presentation.
