= Rakkamma Kaiya Thattu =

Song by S. P. Balasubrahmanyam, Swarnalatha

from the album Thalapathi
- Released: 14 July 1991
- Length: 7:10
- Label: Lahari Music
- Composer: Ilaiyaraaja
- Lyricist: Vaali
- Producer: Ilaiyaraaja

"Rakkamma Kaiya Thattu" (transl. Rakkamma, Clap Your Hands) is a Tamil language song from the 1991 Indian film Thalapathi. The lyrics were written by Vaali and music composed by Ilaiyaraaja, with S. P. Balasubrahmanyam and Swarnalatha providing the vocals. It was named the fourth most popular song in a poll conducted by the BBC World Service worldwide in 2002.

== Recording ==
The song sung by S. P. Balasubrahmanyam and Swarnalatha was featured in the 1991 film Thalapathi, which was known to be the last collaboration of Mani Ratnam and Ilaiyaraaja, the former's regular composer until then. It was recorded in Bombay and was among the first to be recorded for the film. On the insistence of Mani Ratnam, Vaali had "blended" the original lines with Tevaram, a Śaiva devotional poetry. Genre-wise, the song "fuses Tamil folk music, Carnatic traditions, Western classical fugue and polka".

== Music video ==
"When Rajini-Sir is dancing, he puts in a lot of energy and work into it. He matched Prabhu Deva's energy and this is something that Mani Ratnam admired. Prabhu Deva was a kid then but Rajinikanth would match all his steps."

— Santosh Sivan, the song's photographer

The song was shot in Raya Gopuram, Melukote over several days during the night. It was picturised on Rajinikanth and Sonu Walia dancing along with other dancers. Thalapathi was directed by Mani Ratnam while cinematography was handled by Santosh Sivan. The song was choreographed by Mugur Sundar and his son Prabhu Deva. According to Mani Ratnam, it was one of the "big-scale" songs of Sivan in the latter's early career. Set in the backdrop of a temple, the song's pulse changes when Shobana arrives with a group of women possessing oil-lamps, passing the dancers and floating those lamps on a pond. At this point, the music shifts to Tevaram. After that the song returns to its original rhythm.

== Legacy ==
The BBC described the song as one of Ilaiyaraaja's "most celebrated compositions". The global rights for the song was sold to Lahari Music at a compensation of ₹7.5 million (equivalent to ₹58 million or US$600,000 in 2023) in 1992. In 2002, as a part of its 70th anniversary celebrations, the BBC World Service conducted an international poll to choose the ten most popular songs of all time worldwide. More than 1,000 songs from various countries were nominated through an online voting system. "Rakkamma Kaiya Thattu" was leading the poll for a brief period of time leaving behind other popular singles such as Yesterday, Bohemian Rhapsody and Stairway to Heaven. After leading the poll for a brief period, the song was named the fourth most popular when the results were announced on 21 December 2002.

In 2012, Agent Vinod, a Bollywood film starring Saif Ali Khan used the song in a sequence in the film. Lahari Music took legal action against Khan, who also produced the film, for using it without their permission.
