= Sadha =

Indian actress

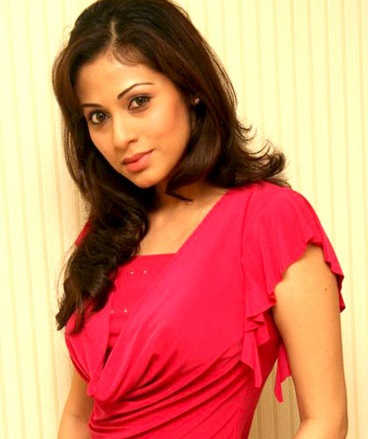
- Sadha in 2010 promoting Click
- Born: Sadaf Mohammed Sayed; 17 February 1984 (age 42); Ratnagiri, Maharashtra, India
- Other name: Sadaa
- Occupations: Actress; wildlife photographer
- Years active: 2002–present

Sadaf Mohammed Sayed, known professionally as Sadha, is an Indian actress and wildlife photographer known for her work in Telugu, Tamil, and Kannada cinema, as well as Telugu television. She made her film debut with the Telugu film Jayam (2002).

== Early life ==
Sadha was born in Ratnagiri, Maharashtra, to a Muslim father and a Hindu mother. Her parents migrated from Belgaum before settling in Ratnagiri.

== Career ==
After making her debut in Jayam (2002), Sadha appeared in the Tamil film Anniyan (2005), opposite Vikram directed by S. Shankar. Since then, she has appeared in a number of films across various film industries of India, in different languages including Monalisa (2004) in Kannada and Click (2010) in Hindi.

In 2014, Sadha joined as a judge for the ninth season of Jodi No 1 on Vijay TV. In 2016, Sadha was one of the judges for Dhee Juniors 1 & 2, a dance-based dance reality show produced by Mallemala Entertainments in Telugu. She is a judge on Dhee Jodi with Sekhar Master, with each season running over a period of one year. It is a weekly show that is broadcast on Wednesdays at 9:30 pm IST on ETV Telugu. She is known for her dressing style in the show.

She appeared in the films Eli in 2015 and Torchlight in 2018.

== Other works ==
Sadha is an animal rights supporter, animal rescuer and vegan. She supports the Federation of Indian Animal Protection Organisations (FIAPO) and has encouraged veganism. Sadha is also a seasoned wildlife photographer.

== Filmography ==
=== Film ===
List of film credits
Year	Title	Role	Language	Notes
2002	Jayam	Sujatha	Telugu	Won—Filmfare Award for Best Actress – Telugu
2003	Naaga	Viji	Telugu	
2003	Jayam	Sujatha	Tamil	
2003	Praanam	Kathyayani / Uma	Telugu	
2004	Varnajaalam	Abhirami	Tamil	
2004	Aethiree	Priya	Tamil	
2004	Monalisa	Monalisa / Spandana	Kannada	
2004	Donga Dongadi	Vijaya Lakshmi a.k.a. Viji	Telugu	
2004	Leela Mahal Center	Anjali	Telugu	
2005	Avunanna Kaadanna	Aravinda	Telugu	
2005	Anniyan	Nandini Krishna	Tamil	Nominated—Filmfare Award for Best Actress – Tamil
2005	Priyasakhi	Priya Santhanakrishnan	Tamil	
2006	Chukkallo Chandrudu	Shravani	Telugu	
2006	Thirupathi	Priya	Tamil	
2006	Veerabhadra	Ashta Laxmi	Telugu	
2006	Mohini 9886788888	Varsha	Kannada	
2007	Unnale Unnale	Jhansi	Tamil	Nominated—Filmfare Award for Best Actress – Tamil
2007	Classmates	Raaji	Telugu	
2007	Shankar Dada Zindabad	Sandhya	Telugu	Guest appearance
2007	Takkari	Priya	Telugu	
2008	Novel	Priya Nandini	Malayalam	
2008	Naan Aval Adhu	Ashwini	Tamil	Unreleased
2009	Love Khichdi	Sandhya Iyengar	Hindi	
2009	A Aa E Ee	Ramya	Telugu	
2010	Click	Sonia	Hindi	
2010	Huduga Hudugi	Maya	Kannada	Guest appearance
2010	Mylari	Anitha	Kannada	
2011	Mallikarjuna	Priya	Kannada	
2011	Puli Vesham	Ashwini	Tamil	
2012	Aarakshaka	Katherine	Kannada	
2012	Mythri	Mythri	Telugu	
2013	Dasa Tirigindi	Gowri	Telugu	
2014	Kelvi	Sadha	Malayalam	Special appearance
2014	Yamaleela 2	Sadha	Telugu	Special appearance
2015	Eli	Julie	Tamil	
2016	Dil Toh Deewana Hai	Anamika	Hindi	
2018	Torchlight	Nila	Tamil	
2023	Ahimsa	Laxmi	Telugu	
2023	Aadikeshava	Parvathy	Telugu	
2025	Madha Gaja Raja	Doctor	Tamil	Delayed Release after 12 years; Special appearance

=== Shelved Projects ===
List of film credits
Title	Role	Language	Notes
Naan Aval Adhu	Ashwini	Tamil	Remains Unreleased

=== Television ===
Year	Title	Role	Channel	Language	notes
2015	Dhee Juniors 1	Judge	E TV	Telugu	
2016	Dhee Juniors 2	Judge	E TV	Telugu	
2016	Dhee Jodi Special	Judge	E TV	Telugu	
2016-2017	Jodi Number One	Judge	Star Vijay	Tamil	
2017	Alitho Saradaga	Guest	E TV	Telugu	
2022	Cash 2.0	Participant	E TV	Telugu	
2022	Hello World	Prardhana	Zee5	Telugu	Web series
2022	BB Jodi Telugu	Judge	Star Maa	Telugu	
2023	Neethone Dance 2	Judge	Star Maa	Telugu	
2023	Neethone Dance 3	Judge	Star Maa	Telugu	

== See also ==
- List of vegans
- List of Indian film actresses
