= Vennelakanti (writer) =

Indian film lyricist (1957–2021)

- Born: 30 November 1957; Nellore, Andhra Pradesh, India
- Died: 5 January 2021 (aged 63) Chennai, Tamil Nadu, India
- Occupations: Lyricist; writer
- Years active: 1986–2021

Vennelakanti Rajeswara Prasad (30 November 1957 – 5 January 2021), known mononymously by his surname Vennelakanti, was an Indian lyricist and writer known for his work in Telugu cinema. He wrote over 2000 film songs, and was awarded Andhra Pradesh State Nandi Award for Best Lyricist in 2000.

== Career ==
Vennelakanti was inclined towards Harikathas, and began writing from a young age. Initially, he worked as a banker and wrote his first film song for Krishnam Raju-starrer Sriramachandrudu.

He was also known for his works as dubbing script writer and contributing lyrics for Tamil films, dubbed into Telugu language.

== Personal life ==
His son, Shashank Vennelakanti, is a dialogue writer avunu. Another son, Rakendu Mouli, is a lyricist, singer, dialogue writer and actor who works in Telugu cinema.

== Filmography ==
Lyricist

- 1987: Vijetha Vikram
- 1987: Marana Homam
- 1988: Murali Krishnudu
- 1988: Vivaha Bhojanambu
- 1988: Varasudochhadu
- 1988: Muddula Mavayya
- 1989: Chettu Kinda Pleader
- 1990: Muddula Menalludu
- 1990: Kondaveeti Rowdy
- 1991: Aditya 369
- 1991: Jaitra Yatra
- 1991: Pichi Pullayya
- 1991: Teneteega
- 1991: Kshana Kshanam
- 1991: Prema Thapassu
- 1992: Sahasam
- 1992: Swathi Kiranam
- 1993: One By Two
- 1993: Abbayigaru
- 1993: Varasudu
- 1994: Allari Premikudu
- 1994: Gharana Alludu
- 1994: Mayadari Mosagadu
- 1994: Theerpu
- 1994: Palnati Pourusham
- 1994: Hello Brother
- 1995: Tapassu
- 1995: Gharana Bullodu
- 1995: Aasthi Mooredu Aasa Baredu
- 1995: Maatho Pettukoku
- 1995: Criminal
- 1996: Sri Krishnarjuna Vijayam
- 1996: Sahasa Veerudu Sagara Kanya
- 1996: Om Ganapathi (Dubbed Version of Tamil film Vetri Vinayagar)
- 1997: Surya Putrulu
- 1997: Rowdy Mogudu Gharana Pellam (Dubbed Version of Tamil film Maaman Magan)
- 1998: Hrudayanjali (Dubbed Version of Tamil film May Maadham)
- 1999: Samarasimha Reddy
- 1999: Seenu
- 1999: Premanuragam (Dubbed Version of Hindi film Hum Saath-Saath Hain)
- 2001: Narasimha Naidu
- 2001: Bhalevadivi Basu
- 2001: Cheppalani Vundhi
- 2002: Takkari Donga
- 2003: Palnati Brahmanayudu
- 2006: Pellaina Kothalo
- 2007: Bhayya (dubbed version of Tamil film Malaikottai)
- 2009: Mitrudu
- 2010: Awara
- 2011: Vastadu Naa Raju
- 2011: Raaj
- 2020: Penguin (dubbed version of Tamil film of same name)

Dialogue writer

- Premanuragam (1999) (Dubbed Version of Hindi film Hum Saath-Saath Hain)
- Panchatantram (2002) (dubbed version of Tamil film of same name)
- Magic Magic 3D (2003) (dubbed version of Tamil film of same name)
- Prema Chadarangam (2004) (dubbed version of Tamil film Chellamae)
- Monalisa (2004) (dubbed version of Kannada film of same name)
- Pothuraju (2004) (dubbed version of Tamil film Virumaandi)
- Mumbai Xpress (2005) (dubbed version of Tamil film of same name)
- Dasavathaaram (2008) (dubbed version of Tamil film of same name)
- Saroja (2008) (dubbed version of Tamil film of same name)
- Aakasamantha (2009) (dubbed version of Tamil film Abhiyum Naanum)
- Manmadha Baanam (2010) (dubbed version of Tamil film Manmadhan Ambu)
- Prema Khaidi (2011) (dubbed version of Tamil film Mynaa)

== Personal life and death ==
His elder son Shashank Vennelakanti works as dialogue writer for dubbed films. His younger son, Rakendu Mouli, also started his career as a lyricist and singer for several dubbing films. His first 'direct' film was Andala Rakshasi, in which he wrote two songs and rendered his voice for one. He made his debut as a lead actor with Moodu Mukkallo Cheppalante.

He died on 5 January 2021, in Chennai after suffering from cardiac arrest.
