= Urchagam =

- Directed by: Ravichandran
- Written by: Ravichandran
- Produced by: GV
- Starring: Nandha; Sherin; Vivek; Dinesh Lamba
- Cinematography: R. B. Gurudev
- Edited by: Jo. Ni. Harsha
- Music by: Ranjit Barot
- Production company: G.V. Films Limited
- Release date: 2 September 2007
- Running time: 146 minutes
- Country: India
- Language: Tamil

Urchagam (English: Excitement) is a 2007 Tamil romantic drama film written and directed by Ravichandran and starring Nandha and Sherin. The storyline is based on the problems and difficulties between a love marriage and arranged marriage. The movie was shot in Chennai, ECR, Puducherry, Goa, and Jothpur. About three songs were shot in Bangkok and its surroundings. Dinesh Lambha was introduced as the villain in this movie and Vivek also plays a prominent role in the movie. Ranjit Barot wrote the film's music. The film was initially titled Coffee Shop, but in order to receive government funding, the producers gave it a Tamil name. It was dubbed into Hindi as Meri Jigar Meri Chahaat. The film is somewhat similar to the Hindi film Humko Deewana Kar Gaye.

== Plot ==
The film revolves around Jency (Sherin), a close friend of Ganesh (Nandha). When Ganesh decides to open his heart and express his love to her, she informs him that she is to be engaged to Nicholas (Dinesh Lamba), who is a rich entrepreneur in London.

Nicholas sponsors Jency's mother's surgery. Knowing well that Nicholas is a jealous and sadistic youth, Jency decides to marry him as a token of gratitude. But life turns miserable for her between her engagement and her wedding. Ganesh steps in and saves her from all her troubles. Ganesh and Nicholas cross swords with each other.

== Cast ==
- Nandha as Ganesh
- Sherin as Jency
- Vivek as Ayyanarkudi Raja
- Dinesh Lamba as Nicholas
- Vaiyapuri as Bhai
- Ramanthan as Church father
- Kamala Krishnasamy
- Chitra Raguvasan
- Sampath Ram
- Vellai Subbaiah
- Citizen Mani
- Bonda Mani
- Kili Ramachandran
- Desikasri as Ganesh's sister

== Production ==
The filming was held at Jodhpur, Goa, Pondicherry and Chennai. The introductory scene of lead pair was picturised at Velankanni Shrine while climax was shot at a desert in Rajasthan and three songs were picturised in Bangkok.

== Soundtrack ==
The soundtrack was composed by Ranjit Barot. The audio was released in 14 April 2007.

- "Kangal" - Zubeen Garg
- "Veyyil" - Kunal Ganjawala
- "Nanba Nanba" - Kunal Ganjawala
- "Netru Vatcha" - Gayatri Ganjawala, Vijay Prakash
- "Narum Pookkal" - Hariharan, Nandini Srikar

== Reception ==
Sify wrote "after seeing the film one gets the feeling that they have ripped off the plot from Julia Roberts emotional thriller Sleeping with the Enemy, added some local sentiments spiced it with Vivek's comedy track (rehashed from his own Run comedy track!), along with some peppy melodies by Ranjit Barot. In the process it turns out to be a overcooked, tasteless Kitchadi of various films". Malini Mannath of Chennai Online wrote "Not much originality here, nor even a decent adaptation. More of a massacre than a rehash!".
