= Mohabbat Ho Gayi Hai Tumse =

- Directed by: Rishi Talwar
- Screenplay by: Rishi Talwar
- Story by: Rishi Talwar
- Produced by: Satish Khanna
- Starring: Sanjay Dutt; Chandrachur Singh; Shamita Shetty
- Edited by: Sanjay Verma
- Music by: Sanjeev Darshan
- Production company: Satish Khanna Productions
- Release date: 2002
- Country: India
- Language: Hindi

Mohabbat Ho Gayi Hai Tumse is a 2002 Hindi romance film directed by Rishi Talwar and produced by Satish Khanna. The film features Sanjay Dutt, Chandrachur Singh and Shamita Shetty as main characters. Despite being completed in 2001, the film remains unreleased.

== Cast ==
- Sanjay Dutt as Aryan
- Chandrachur Singh as Raj
- Shamita Shetty as Megha
- Payal Rohatgi as Natasha
- Anupama Verma
- Tinu Anand
- Anju Mahendru
- Alok Nath
- Puru Raaj Kumar
- Dinesh Lamba
- Vrajesh Hirjee
- Rajiv Verma
- Rekha Rao
- Vishwajeet Pradhan

== Music ==
The music of the film was composed by Sanjeev-Darshan and the lyrics were written by Sameer.

No.	Title	Lyrics	Singer(s)	Length
1.	"Mere Sanam"	Sameer	Kavita Krishnamurthy, Shaurin Bhatt	4:56
2.	"Mohabbat Ho Gayi Hai Tumse"	Sameer	Sonu Nigam, Mahalakshmi Iyer	5:42
3.	"O Sathiya"	Sameer	Shaan, Shreya Ghoshal	5:00
4.	"Saiyan Sanye Sanyoni"	Sameer	Sunidhi Chauhan	5:01
5.	"Sona Sona Mukhda"	Sameer	Alka Yagnik, Javed Ali	4:57
6.	"Bahon Mein Aaja"		Kumar Sanu, Alka Yagnik
7.	"Kaise Kahoon Ke Tum Mere Kya Ho"		Kumar Sanu, Alka Yagnik
Total length:				29:34
