= Jambuda =

Village in Jamnagar district, Gujarat, India

Coordinates: 22°31′N 70°13′E

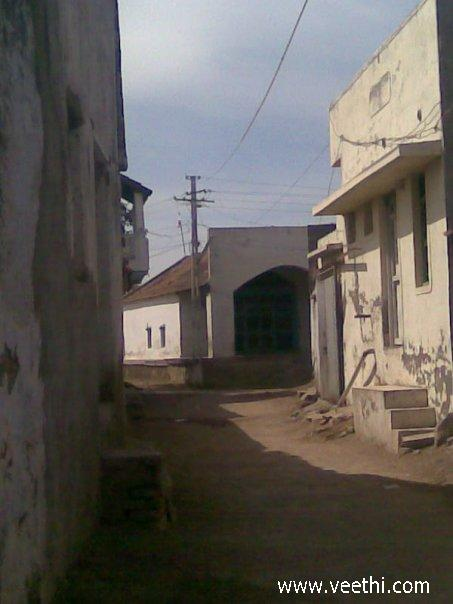
Jambudam 2018

Jambuda is a small village in Jamnagar district, which is a part of the Indian state of Gujarat. It is situated 16 kilometres (9.9 mi) from Jamnagar towards Rajkot on State Highway.

The village is situated on the way to the only Sainik School of Gujarat, "Sainik School Balachadi".

== Places to visit near Jambuda ==
1. Ranuja Ramdevpir Temple (4 km)
2. Khijadiya Bird sanctuary (5 km)
3. Jamnagar or Nawanagar (16 km)
