= Thalapathi =

1991 film by Mani Ratnam

- Theatrical release poster
- Directed by: Mani Ratnam
- Written by: Mani Ratnam
- Produced by: G. Venkateswaran
- Starring: Rajinikanth; Mammootty; Aravind Swami
- Cinematography: Santosh Sivan
- Edited by: Suresh Urs
- Music by: Ilaiyaraaja
- Production company: GV Films
- Distributed by: GV Films
- Release date: 5 November 1991
- Running time: 167 minutes
- Country: India
- Language: Tamil
- Budget: ₹3 crore

Thalapathi (transl. Commander) is a 1991 Indian Tamil-language crime drama film written and directed by Mani Ratnam, and produced by G. Venkateswaran. The film stars Rajinikanth and Mammootty with Arvind Swamy in his feature-film debut, Jaishankar, Amrish Puri, Srividya, Bhanupriya, Shobana and Geetha in supporting roles. It is about a courageous slum dweller who befriends a powerful gangster and the attempts of a district collector to thwart them.

The plot of Thalapathi is based on the friendship between Karna and Duryodhana, characters from the Hindu epic, Mahabharata. Ilaiyaraaja, in his last collaboration with Mani Ratnam, composed the film's score and soundtrack, and the lyrics were written by poet Vaali. The cinematography was handled by Santosh Sivan and the editor was Suresh Urs. Most of the filming took place in Karnataka state. With a budget of ₹3 crore, at the time of its release, Thalapathi was the most expensive South Indian film.

Thalapathi was released on 5 November 1991, Diwali day; it became a critical and commercial success, and won many awards including two Filmfare Awards South: Best Director – Tamil (Ratnam) and Best Music Director – Tamil (Ilaiyaraaja), and two Cinema Express Awards: Best Actor – Tamil (Rajinikanth) and Best Character Actress (Srividya). It was remade in Kannada as Annavru (2003).

== Plot ==
Fourteen-year-old Kalyani gives birth to a son out of wedlock and, fearing societal ostracization and her own inability to care for him, abandons the infant inside a moving cargo train. The baby is discovered and adopted by a resident of a nearby slum, who names him Surya. Growing up, Surya becomes highly intolerant of systemic injustice inflicted upon the underprivileged, while constantly questioning why his biological mother abandoned him; his only link to his past is the yellow shawl in which he was wrapped as an infant. Concurrently, Devaraj is a powerful, parallel-justice gang lord who uses violence to combat societal exploitation, making him both feared and respected. When Ramana, a tyrannical henchman working under Devaraj, terrorizes the local slum, Surya intercedes and accidentally kills him. Surya is arrested and subjected to police torture, but Devaraj intervenes to secure his release after realizing that Ramana's actions were predatory and that Surya's cause was genuine. Recognizing their shared ideology, Devaraj appoints Surya as his Thalapathi (commander) and chief confidant, forming an unbreakable bond of friendship. Kalivardhan(who used to be an MLA and whom Devaraj used to work for but turned against him after Devaraj killed his eldest son who tried to kill Devaraj) tries to make Surya join his side but Surya refuses to, this impresses Devaraj who begins seeing Surya as his own brother.

Meanwhile, Arjun, an upright Indian Administrative Service (IAS) officer, is appointed as the city's new District Collector with a mandate to lawfully dismantle organized crime syndicates. Arjun is Kalyani's second son; after abandoning Surya, she had married Krishnamoorthy, a supportive man, and built a legitimate life as a physician and social worker, though she remains privately consumed by guilt over her lost firstborn. Concurrently, Surya is courted by Subbulaxmi, a Brahmin woman drawn to his protective nature. While Devaraj attempts to facilitate a marriage between them, Subbulaxmi’s traditionalist father fiercely objects to Surya’s violent lifestyle and instead arranges her marriage to Arjun. After a meeting between Devaraj and Kalivardhan, Kalivardhan's men armed with knives and aruvals subsequently try to kill Devaraj after two of Devaraj's men betray him, Devaraj manages to defeat Kalivardhan's men but is heavily wounded and Surya arrives in time to take him to the hospital. Surya and Devaraj's men then track one of the traitors and Surya burns the traitor alive in front of Krishnamurthy.

As Arjun wages a legal campaign against Devaraj and Surya, Surya is confronted by Padma, Ramana's grieving widow. Riddled with guilt over leaving Padma destitute, Surya confesses his remorse to Devaraj. To secure Padma and her young daughter's safety and rehabilitation, Devaraj suggests that Surya marry her. Surya agrees, and over time, he earns the trust and affection of Padma and her child.

Following inquiries and a subsequent police lineup identification to identify the killer of the man whom Surya burnt, Krishnamoorthy deduces that Surya is her long-lost firstborn and refuses to reveal him as the culprit. Krishnamoorthy secretly confronts Surya to reveal his lineage. Shocked but protective of his mother's reputation, Surya requests that Krishnamoorthy keep his identity a secret from Kalyani, fearing the knowledge that her son became a notorious vigilante would devastate her. However, Kalyani eventually discovers the truth herself during a local medical camp, Kalyani notices Padma's daughter wrapped in the distinctive yellow shawl and she reveals how Surya came to the slum. She then confronts Surya at his house, overcome with maternal emotion, she pleads for peace; Surya relents, vowing never to harm his half-brother Arjun under any circumstance.

The long-standing feud between Devaraj and his chief underworld rival, Kalivardhan, reaches a crisis point after Arjun and SP become allies with Kalivardhan after the second traitor agrees to become an approver for the three of them and during an attempt to arrest Devaraj, Devaraj's wife Selvi who was pregnant faces a miscarriage when she is pushed by the police and the people nearby. Surya beats the policemen who was responsible for Devaraj's wife's miscarriage and Devaraj is subsequently arrested. Devaraj is subjected to police torture and a riot ensures to release Deva, and Surya shoots the approver dead. Devaraj is then released and Surya confesses his true lineage to Devaraj after he tries to make Surya kill Arjun and the SP, he is deeply moved that Surya intends to honor their friendship over his newfound family ties. Meanwhile the SP tries to have Surya and Deva killed through Kalivardhan to which Arjun objects at first and his mother convinces them to stop as she reveals that Surya is her son, the SP then attempts to make Kalivardhan and his second son back off but Kalivardhan refuses to. Touched by this loyalty, Devaraj decides to peacefully surrender to Arjun to end the cycle of violence. However, as Devaraj and Surya arrive with Selvi and his henchmen to meet Arjun, Kalivardhan's assassins also arrive and ambush Surya and Devaraj. Kalivardhan's main henchmen shoots them resulting in Surya getting injured, and Devaraj being fatally wounded by the shots, and dies in Surya's arms whom cries in agony with Selvi. Enraged on losing his only friend, the injured Surya storms Kalivardhan's compound despite Arjun's pleas and manages to kill most of Kalivardhan's henchmen and his second son. Surya then threatens and beats up Devaraj's killer who takes him to Kalivardhan's room. Kalivardhan accidentally shoots Devaraj's killer dead in an attempt to kill Surya. Surya then mercilessly beats up Kalivardhan berating him for killing Deva and shoots him dead. He surrenders to the police after performing Deva's last rites during his funeral but is exonerated by the SP due to lack of witness testimony and evidence. Arjun is transferred to a different state and departs with Subbulaxmi, while Kalyani chooses to remain with Surya.

== Cast ==
- Rajinikanth as Surya
- Mammootty as Devaraj
- Arvind Swamy as Arjun Krishnamoorthy
- Jaishankar as Krishnamoorthy
- Amrish Puri as Kalivarathan
- Srividya as Kalyani
- Bhanupriya as Padma
- Shobana as Subbulakshmi
- Geetha as Selvi
- Nagesh as Panthulu
- Charuhasan as Srinivasan
- Kitty as Sundaram
- Charle as Mani
- Nirmalamma as Pattamma
- Sonu Walia (special appearance in the song "Rakkamma Kaiya Thattu")
- P. L. Narayana as Sethuraman
- Pradeep Shakthi as Selva
- Manoj K. Jayan as Manoharan
- Dinesh as Ramana
- Tarun as a petty thief (uncredited)

== Production ==
=== Development ===
Rajinikanth was a friend of Mani Ratnam's brother G. Venkateswaran of GV Films, and they were talking about making a film together. Ratnam had met Rajinikanth twice because he had expressed interest in working with Ratnam, who had nothing for him then. Ratnam needed a film with scope for Rajinikanth's stardom but would remain Ratnam's film. Ratnam wanted something Rajinikanth could not refuse and that Ratnam really wanted to do. Soon the concept of the story of Karna from the Indian epic Mahabharata, which became the basis for Thalapathi and was a contemporary version of the Mahabharata from Karna's perspective, came up. Ratnam wanted to present a realistic Rajinikanth, which he saw in Mullum Malarum (1978) without his style elements and larger-than-life image. Thalapathi was cinematographer Santosh Sivan's first film in Tamil, and his first project with Ratnam. He was chosen after the director was impressed with his work in the Hindi film Raakh (1989). The film was edited by Suresh Urs, and art-directed by Thota Tharani. Thalapathi remains the only collaboration between Ratnam and Rajinikanth.

=== Casting ===
Rajinikanth played Surya, who is a representation of Karna. Rajinikanth insisted Karna's friend Duryodhana, who is important to the story, was correctly cast; Mammootty was eventually cast as Devaraj, the equivalent of Duryodhana. He was then filming for Joshiy's Kuttettan (1990) and initially declined the role after listening to Ratnam's narration of the story, but after advice from Joshiy, accepted. For the role of Surya's brother Arjun, Ratnam wanted someone with a sophisticated look and fluency in English. Mammootty suggested Jayaram to Ratnam for the role, but Jayaram declined due to scheduling conflicts. Ratnam saw Arvind Swamy in a television commercial and approached him to play Arjun; after a few screen tests, Arvind – who was only credited with his first name – was cast in his feature-film debut. Mammootty was paid ₹10 lakh (equivalent to ₹94 lakh or US$100,000 in 2026) (Note: The 1991 exchange rate was 17.90 Indian rupees (₹) to one US dollar ($).) and Amrish Puri, who portrayed the antagonist Kalivardhan, and shaved his head for the role, received ₹5 lakh (equivalent to ₹47 lakh or US$50,000 in 2026) for only five days of filming.

Despite being almost three years younger than Rajinikanth, Srividya was cast as Surya's mother Kalyani. Mohini was the original choice for the role that Bhanupriya eventually played. When Bhanupriya was cast as the widow of a man killed by Surya, whom she later marries, Ratnam told her there would be no songs for her because Surya "was the cause of her husband's death. So it can't be the start of a new romantic track". Ratnam said the casting of Bhanupriya showed "there was some weight to the character, and you don't have to invest in terms of songs and things like that. Her very presence makes the character strong". Shobana was cast as Subbulaxmi, her second film role opposite Rajinikanth after Siva (1989). Manoj K. Jayan was cast as Manoharan – his first role in Tamil cinema – after Ratnam was impressed with his performance in the Malayalam film Perumthachan (1990).

=== Filming ===
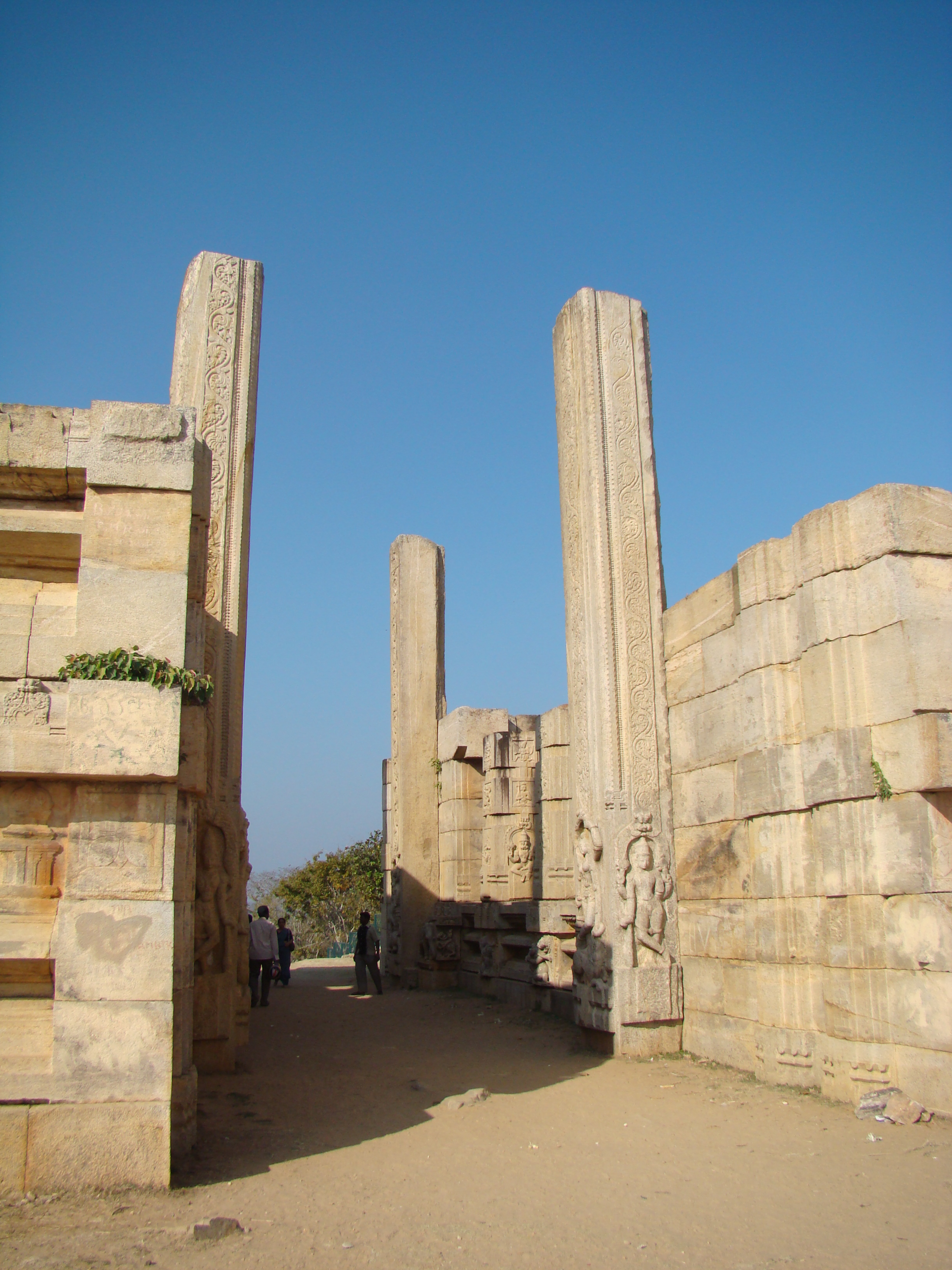
Rayagopura, Melkote seen in the song "Rakkamma"

Principal photography began before the role of Arjun had been cast. Ratnam said he chose to film in Mysore, Karnataka, because it had everything the script required, including a waterfront and a river. According to Sivan, Ratnam chose Mysore because "there'd be less people" having extreme adulation for Rajinikanth. The slum scenes were filmed in Madras on a set that was erected by Thota Tharani.

The first scene to be filmed was Subbulaxmi teaching a group of students by a river. Because the rising sun was important to the scene, it was filmed earlier than 5:45 am. By the time Rajinikanth came to film his part in the scene, the sun had already risen. To avoid continuity errors, he filmed after 4:30 am the next day. When filming against the "early morning or the late evening sun" was not possible, the crew used tungsten lights and mirrors to create the intended effect.

Ratnam chose to film the prologue in which Kalyani gives birth to Surya in black and white because according to him, "Black and white gives the sense of this being a prologue without us having to define it as a prologue". He delayed filming the scene in which Surya meets his biological mother for the first time by a day at the request of Rajinikanth, who needed more time to prepare.

The songs "Rakkamma Kaiya Thattu" and "Sundari Kannal" were filmed at Rayagopura, Melukote and Chennakeshava Temple, Somanathapura – both in Karnataka – respectively. "Rakkamma Kaiya Thattu" was filmed over several nights, and choreographed by Prabhu Deva and his father Mugur Sundar. Rajinikanth wore Samurai apparel for "Sundari Kannal"; according to The Hindu's S. Shiva Kumar, this was the closest Ratnam came to doing something like his idol Akira Kurosawa. With a budget of ₹30 million (equivalent to ₹280 million or US$3.0 million in 2026), Thalapathi was the most expensive South Indian film at the time.

== Themes ==
Thalapathi is a contemporary adaptation of the Mahabharata but because the film's focus is Surya, it dispenses with the epic's ensemble nature. The character Subbulaxmi is based on Draupadi, Arjun on Arjuna and Kalyani on Kunti. The film was not originally publicised as an adaptation of the Mahabharata; Ratnam said this was because the "parallels are hidden sufficiently inside the story to make it work. That is the way I wanted it – at a layer below and not crying out loud". Venkateswaran said the film "questions people's normally held ideas of friendship". According to New Straits Times, the film does not extol crime or violence; rather it narrates the story of a tragic character who rises from slums to gain untold riches and unbridled power.

Ratnam refused to name Surya's father, saying the film "consciously avoids the who and the how of the underage girl's first love" because Surya is the focus of the story. The name Surya was chosen to emphasise the character's connection to the sun, similar to the way Karna is the son of the sun god Surya in the Mahabharata. Ratnam never considered killing Surya, unlike the Mahabharata in which Karna dies, because he felt the character had suffered enough, and "his death would look too doomed, too tragic".

== Soundtrack ==
The soundtrack was composed by Ilaiyaraaja, with lyrics written by Vaali. Thalapathi marked the final collaboration among Ilaiyaraaja and Ratnam, as the latter had associated with A. R. Rahman for his later projects, beginning with Roja (1992). The original Tamil version of the soundtrack album includes seven songs with lyrics that were written by Vaali. The six songs of the Hindi-dubbed version Dalapathi were written by P. K. Mishra. Rajasri wrote the lyrics for the Telugu-dubbed version. Lahari Music released the Kannada-dubbed version of the film's soundtrack which was titled Nanna Dalapathi, and V. Nagendra Prasad penned its lyrics.

== Marketing ==
In a first-of-its-kind marketing strategy in India, GV Films launched "a whole range of consumer products" based on the lead character of Thalapathi. As part of the marketing strategy, all products would be "of the highest quality" and sport the film's name.

== Release ==
Thalapathi was released on 5 November 1991 during the Diwali festival. The film was a major critical and commercial success.

=== Reception ===
On 8 November 1991, The Hindu said; "Moving his pieces with the acumen of an international grandmaster, the director sets a hot pace". The same day, N. Krishnaswamy of The Indian Express said; "One reason why Thalapathi, despite its visual grandeur is not as riveting as it should have been is that it does not have a strong antagonist". On 1 December 1991, the review board of Ananda Vikatan praised Ilaiyaraaja's music, called the film a mountain of a masala entertainer, and said Rajinikanth had several scenes in which he could emote and that he looks a caged lion left in the open. The magazine Kalki wrote a review of the film as a discussion panel alongside directors S. P. Muthuraman and Mahendran reviewing the film. In that review, the film's cast performances, cinematography and music were praised but the violence was criticised.

=== Accolades ===
Event	Award	Recipient	Ref.
39th Filmfare Awards South	Best Director – Tamil	Mani Ratnam	
39th Filmfare Awards South	Best Music Director – Tamil	Ilaiyaraaja	
12th Cinema Express Awards	Best Actor – Tamil	Rajinikanth	
12th Cinema Express Awards	Best Character Actress	Srividya	
Film Fans Association Awards	Best Character Actress	Srividya	
Film Fans Association Awards	Best Photographer	Santosh Sivan	

== Legacy ==
C. S. Amudhan said Thalapathi was "really ahead of its time" and called it "intellectual entertaining cinema". Karthik Subbaraj said he watched the film during his childhood. Subbaraj's 2014 film Jigarthanda includes several references to Thalapathi. Rajinikanth's daughter, director Soundarya, said; "I remember Thalapathy most vividly as that was the first time I went for a first-day-first-show ever". Mammootty's performance in the scene in which Devaraj tells Arjun "mudiyathu" (transl. It’s impossible) after being asked to surrender everything inspired director Mahi V Raghav to cast him in Yatra (2019).

Tamizh Padam (2010) parodied Thalapathi by featuring scenes with characters who are dimly lit and speak one-word dialogues. Atlee, who directed Raja Rani (2013), cites Thalapathi as the main inspiration that led him to consider a career in cinema. Soundarya has stated Rajinikanth's hairstyle in her directorial venture Kochadaiiyaan (2014) was inspired by his appearance in Thalapathi. Baradwaj Rangan compared Kadal (2013) to Thalapathi, both of which feature a character "who yearns for a lost mother and who is coerced into a life of crime".

== Remakes ==
Thalapathi was remade in Kannada as Annavru (2003). In November 2011, producer Bharat Shah acquired the Hindi remake rights, despite having a Hindi dubbed version for this film released in 1993.

== Re-release ==
The film was remastered and re-released on 12 December 2024, coinciding with Rajinikanth's 74th birthday.

== Bibliography ==
- Ramachandran, Naman (2014) [2012]. Rajinikanth: The Definitive Biography. New Delhi: Penguin Books. ISBN 978-0-14-342111-5.
- Rangan, Baradwaj (2012). Conversations with Mani Ratnam. India: Penguin Books. ISBN 978-0-670-08520-0.
