= G. Venkateswaran =

Indian film producer (d. 2003)

- Born: Gopalaratnam Venkateswaran; Madurai, Tamil Nadu, India
- Died: 3 May 2003 (aged 55); Chennai, Tamil Nadu, India
- Education: University of Madras
- Occupations: Film producer, chartered accountant
- Spouse: Sujatha
- Children: 2
- Relatives: Mani Ratnam (brother)

Gopalaratnam Venkateswaran (died 3 May 2003), popularly known as G.V., was an Indian film producer and chartered accountant. He was the elder brother of director and screenwriter Mani Ratnam and G. Srinivasan. Venkateswaran was the promoter of GV Films, one of the first movie companies in India to raise capital through the stock market and Sujatha Productions.

== Early life ==
G. Venkateswaran was the eldest son of S. Gopala Ratnam, who produced films for Venus Pictures. His younger brothers were Mani Ratnam and G. Srinivasan. Venkateswaran studied commerce at University of Madras, and became a chartered accountant. He remained one for nearly a decade before venturing into film distribution, and production.

== Filmography ==
Year	Film	Ref.
1986	Mouna Ragam	
1988	Agni Natchathiram	
1989	Guru	
1990	Vedikkai En Vadikkai	
1990	Anjali	
1991	Thalapathi	
1992	Neenga Nalla Irukkanum	
1994	May Maadham	
1995	Indira	
2002	Thamizhan	
2002	Yai! Nee Romba Azhaga Irukey!	
2003	Chokka Thangam	
Films produced after GV's death
2005	Ullam Ketkume	
2006	Kaivantha Kalai	
2007	Urchagam	
2009	TN 07 AL 4777	

Actor

Year	Film	Role
1990	Raja Kaiya Vacha	Himself
1991	Eeramana Rojave	Principal
1997	Pagaivan	Padmanabhan

== Personal life and death ==
Venkateswaran was married to Sujatha, and they had two children. On 3 May 2003, Venkateswaran, aged 55, committed suicide by hanging at his residence.
