= Singeetham Srinivasa Rao filmography =

Filmography of Singeetham Srinivasa Rao

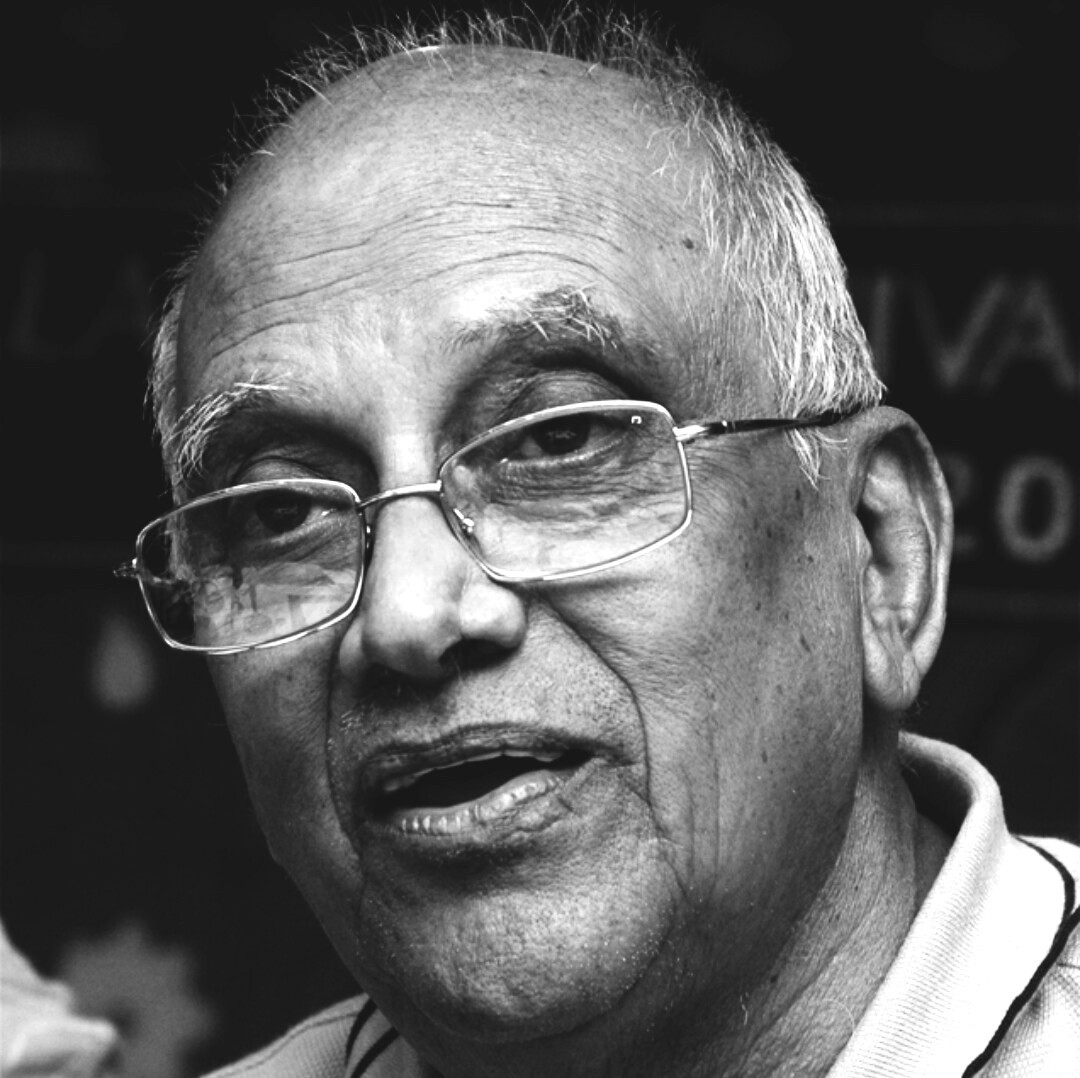
Singeetham Srinivasa Rao

Singeetham Srinivasa Rao is an Indian film director, screenwriter and actor. He has directed around sixty films across multiple genres and languages, including Telugu, Kannada, Tamil, Hindi, and English. He is widely regarded as one of India's most versatile and innovative filmmakers.

== Film ==
Key
†	Denotes films that have not yet been released

List of Singeetham Srinivasa Rao film credits
Year	Title	Language	Credited as		Notes
Year	Title	Language	Director	Writer	Notes
1972	Neeti Nijayiti	Telugu	Yes	Yes	
1974	Dikkatra Parvathi	Tamil	Yes	Screenplay	
1975	Zamindaru Gari Ammayi	Telugu	Yes	No	
1976	Oka Deepam Veligindhi	Telugu	Yes	No	
1976	America Ammayi	Telugu	Yes	Screenplay	
1977	Tharam Marindi	Telugu	Yes	Screenplay	
1977	Andame Anandam	Telugu	Yes	No	
1977	Niraparayum Nilavilakkum	Malayalam	Yes	No	
1978	Panthulamma	Telugu	Yes	Screenplay	
1978	Rama Chilaka	Telugu	Yes	No	
1978	Gammathu Goodacharulu	Telugu	Yes	Screenplay	
1979	Sommokadidhi Sokokadidhi	Telugu	Yes	Screenplay	
1979	Mangala Thoranalu	Telugu	Yes	No	
1980	Triloka Sundari	Telugu	Yes	Screenplay	
1980	Gandara Golam	Telugu	Yes	Screenplay	
1980	Pilla Zamindar	Telugu	Yes	Screenplay	
1981	Raja Paarvai	Tamil	Yes	No	Shot simultaneously
1981	Amavasya Chandrudu	Telugu	Yes	No	Shot simultaneously
1981	Jegantalu	Telugu	Yes	No	
1982	Thrilok Sundhari	Hindi	Yes	Screenplay	
1982	Haalu Jenu	Kannada	Yes	Screenplay	
1982	Chalisuva Modagalu	Kannada	Yes	Screenplay	
1983	Eradu Nakshatragalu	Kannada	Yes	Screenplay	
1983	Raju Rani Jackie	Telugu	Yes	Screenplay	
1984	Shravana Banthu	Kannada	Yes	Yes	
1984	Vasantha Geetam	Telugu	Yes	Yes	
1984	Sangeeta Samrat	Telugu	Yes	Screenplay	
1984	Mayuri	Telugu	Yes	Screenplay	
1985	Jwaalamukhi	Kannada	Yes	Screenplay	
1986	Bhagyada Lakshmi Baramma	Kannada	Yes	Yes	
1986	Anand	Kannada	Yes	Yes	
1987	America Abbayi	Telugu	Yes	Screenplay	
1987	Shruthi Seridaaga	Kannada	No	Screenplay	
1987	Pushpaka Vimana	Sound (Note: Won National Award as a Kannada entry.)	Yes	Yes	Also producer
1988	Devatha Manushya	Kannada	Yes	Yes	
1988	Chiranjeevi Sudhakar	Kannada	Yes	Yes	
1988	Samyuktha	Kannada	No	Screenplay	
1989	Apoorva Sagodharargal	Tamil	Yes	No	
1990	Michael Madana Kama Rajan	Tamil	Yes	No	
1991	Aditya 369	Telugu	Yes	Yes	
1992	Ksheera Sagara	Kannada	Yes	Yes	
1992	Belliyappa Bangarappa	Kannada	No	Yes	
1992	Brundavanam	Telugu	Yes	Yes	
1993	Phool	Hindi	Yes	Story	
1994	Magalir Mattum	Tamil	Yes	No	
1994	Bhairava Dweepam	Telugu	Yes	Yes	
1994	Madam	Telugu	Yes	Yes	
1995	Chinna Vathiyar	Tamil	Yes	Yes	
1996	Sri Krishnarjuna Vijayam	Telugu	Yes	Screenplay	
1998	Rajahamsa	Telugu	Yes	Yes	
1998	Kaathala Kaathala	Tamil	Yes	No	
1999	Tuvvi Tuvvi Tuvvi	Kannada	Yes	No	
2001	Little John	Tamil; English; Hindi	Yes	Yes	
2001	Akasa Veedhilo	Telugu	Yes	Yes	
2002	Makeup	Kannada	Yes	Screenplay	
2003	Vijayam	Telugu	Yes	Yes	
2003	Son of Alladin	English	Yes	Yes	Animated film
2005	Mumbai Xpress	Tamil; Hindi	Yes	No	Shot simultaneously
2008	Ghatothkach	Hindi	Yes	Yes	Animated film
2013	Welcome Obama	Telugu	Yes	Screenplay	
2022	Pratibimbalu	Telugu	Yes	Screenplay	Shot in 1982; co-directed by K. S. Prakash Rao
2026	Sing Geetham	Telugu	Yes	Yes	

== Other credits in films ==
=== Composing credits ===
List of Singeetham Srinivasa Rao film composing credits
Year	Title	Credited as		Language	Notes
Year	Title	Songs	Score	Language	Notes
1986	Bhagyada Lakshmi Baramma	Yes	Yes	Kannada	
1988	Samyuktha	Yes	No	Kannada	
2008	Ghatothkach	Yes	No	Hindi	
2013	Welcome Obama	Yes	Yes	Telugu	Also lyricist and playback singer

=== Acting credits ===
List of Singeetham Srinivasa Rao film acting credits
Year	Title	Role	Language	Notes	Ref(s)
1978	Panthulamma		Telugu		
1983	Andhra Kesari		Telugu		
1990	Michael Madana Kama Rajan	Travelling singer	Tamil	Cameo appearance in the song "Kadha Kelu Kadha Kelu"	
2010	Varudu	Sandy's grandfather	Telugu		
2013	Chinni Chinni Aasa		Telugu		
2015	Kanche	Pianist	Telugu	Cameo appearance	
2024	Bhale Unnade	Old man	Telugu		
