= List of Telugu films of 1977 =

This is a list of Telugu-language films produced in the year 1977.

== 1977 ==
Title	Director	Cast	Notes
Aalu Magalu	T. Rama Rao	Akkineni Nageswara Rao, Vanisri	
Aame Katha	K. Raghavendra Rao	Jayasudha, Rajinikanth	
Aatmiyudu	T. Rama Rao	Akkineni Nageswara Rao, Jayachitra	
Adavi Ramudu	K. Raghavendra Rao	N. T. Rama Rao, Jaya Prada, Jayasudha	
Amara Deepam	K. Raghavendra Rao	Krishnam Raju, Jayasudha, Muralimohan, Kaikala Satyanarayana, Jayamalini	
Bangaru Bommalu	V. B. Rajendra Prasad	Akkineni Nageswara Rao, Manjula	
Bhale Alludu	P. Chandrasekhara Reddy	Mohan Babu, Krishnam Raju, Saradha, Padmapriya	
Chakradhari	V. Madhusudhana Rao	Akkineni Nageswara Rao, Vanisri	
Chanakya Chandragupta	N. T. Rama Rao	Akkineni Nageswara Rao, N. T. Rama Rao, Sivaji Ganesan, Jaya Prada, Manjula, S. Varalakshmi	
Chilakamma Cheppindi	Eranki Sharma	Rajinikanth, Sangeeta, Sripriya	
Chillarakottu Chittemma	Dasari Narayana Rao	Murali Mohan, Jayachitra, Gokina Rama Rao	
Daana Veera Soora Karna	N. T. Rama Rao	N. T. Rama Rao, Sharada, Nandamuri Harikrishna, Nandamuri Balakrishna	
Devathalara Deevinchandi	Kommineni Seshagiri Rao	Ranganath, Chandra Mohan, Prabha, Jayamalini	
Edureeta	V. Madhusudhana Rao	N. T. Rama Rao, Vanisri	
Eetharam Manishi	V. Madhusudhana Rao	Sobhan Babu, Lakshmi, Jaya Prada	
Gadusu Pillodu	K. Bapayya	Sobhan Babu, Jamuna, Manjula, Prabhakar Reddy, Devika	
Jeevana Teeralu	G. C. Sekhar	Krishnam Raju, Vanisri, Jayasudha	
Jeevitha Nouka	K. Viswanath	Sobhan Babu, Jayasudha, Jaya Prada	
Kalpanaa	K. Raghavendra Rao	Murali Mohan, Jayachitra, Gummadi, Allu Ramalingaiah	
Kanya Kumari	Dasari Narayana Rao	Narasimharaju, Srividya, Jayamalini	
Khaidi Kalidasu	C. Subrahmanyam	Sobhan Babu, Mohan Babu, Deepa	
Kurukshetram	Kamalakara Kameswara Rao	Krishna, Sobhan Babu, Krishnam Raju	
Maa Iddari Katha	Nandamuri Ramesh	N. T. Rama Rao, Manjula Vijayakumar, Jaya Prada, Pandari Bai	
Panthulamma	Singeetham Srinivasa Rao	Lakshmi, Ranganath, Sarath Babu, Deepa	
Premalekhalu	K. Raghavendra Rao	Ananth Nag, Jayasudha, Deepa, Murali Mohan, Allu Ramalingaiah	
Raja Ramesh	V. Madhusudhana Rao	ANR, Vanisri	
Seetha Rama Vanavasam	Kamalakara Kameshwara Rao	K. S. Ravikumar, Kaikala Satyanarayana, Jaya Prada, B. Saroja Devi, Anjali Devi, Gummadi	
Sneham	Bapu	Saikumar Pudipeddi, Roja Krishna, Rajendra Prasad	
Tharam Marindi	Singeetam Srinivasa Rao	Sridhar, G. S. R. Murthy, Dasarathi	
Tholireyi Gadichindi	K. S. Rami Reddy	Murali Mohan, Rajinikanth, Jayachitra	
Yamagola	T. Rama Rao	N. T. Rama Rao, Jaya Prada, Kaikala Satyanarayana, Rao Gopal Rao	
