= List of Telugu films of 1976 =

This is a list of Telugu-language films produced in the year 1976.

== 1976 ==
Title	Director	Cast	Sources
America Ammayi	Singeetam Srinivasa Rao	Devayani, Ranganath	
Aradhana	B. V. Prasad; V. Madhusudhana Rao	N. T. Rama Rao, Vanisri, Savithri, Saradha, Relangi	
Anthuleni Katha	K. Balachander	Jaya Prada, Rajinikanth, Fatafat Jayalakshmi, Sripriya, Kamal Haasan	
Bangaru Manishi	A. Bhimsingh	N. T. Rama Rao, Lakshmi	
Bhakta Kannappa	Bapu	Krishnam Raju, Vanisri	
Bhale Dongalu	K. S. R. Das	Krishna, Manjula	
Iddaru Iddare	V. Madhusudhana Rao	Sobhan Babu, Krishnam Raju, Manjula, Chandrakala	
Jyothi	K. Raghavendra Rao	Murali Mohan, Jayasudha, Gummadi, Chaya Devi, Giribabu, Rao Gopala Rao, Satyanarayana, Krishna Kumari, Shubha	
Maa Daivam	S. S. Balan	N. T. Rama Rao, Jayachitra	
Mahakavi Kshetrayya	C. S. Rao	Akkineni Nageswara Rao, Anjali Devi, Manjula, Kanchana, Prabha, Rao Gopal Rao, Raja Babu, Jayasudha, M. Prabhakar Reddy	
Magaadu	S. D. Lal	N. T. Rama Rao, Ramakrishna, Manjula Vijayakumar, Latha Sethupathi	
Mahatmudu	M. S. Gopinath	ANR, Sharada	
Manchiki Maro Peru	C. S. Rao	Krishnam Raju, Padmapriya	
Manushulanta Okkate	Dasari Narayana Rao	N. T. Rama Rao, Jamuna, Allu Ramalingaiah, Rama Prabha	
Monagadu	T. Krishna	Sobhan Babu, Manjula, Jayasudha, Rao Gopal Rao	
Muthyala Pallaki	Dasari Narayana Rao	Jayasudha, Narayana Rao, Pandari Bai	
Naa Pere Bhagavan	S. D. Lal	Ramakrishna, Manjula, Jayamalini	
Neram Nadi Kadu Akalidi	S. D. Lal	N. T. Rama Rao, Manjula Vijayakumar	
Oorummadi Brathukulu	B. S. Narayana	Rallapalli, Madhavi	
Pichi Maaraju	V. B. Rajendra Prasad	Sobhan Babu, Manjula, Anjali Devi, Rao Gopal Rao	
Pogarubothu	T. Prakash Rao	Sobhan Babu, Vanisree, Nirmalamma	
Prema Bandham	K. Viswanath	Sobhan Babu, Vanisree, Jaya Prada	
Raju Vedale	T. Rama Rao	Sobhan Babu, Jayasudha	
Secretary	K. S. Prakash Rao	Akkineni Nageswara Rao, Vanisree, Chandra Mohan, Jayasudha	
Siri Siri Muvva	K. Viswanath	Jaya Prada, Chandra Mohan	
Sita Kalyanam	Bapu	Ravi Kumar, Jaya Prada, Gummadi, Dhulipala, Mikkilineni, Kaikala Satyanarayana, Mukkamala, Jamuna, Hemalatha	
Soggadu	K. Bapaiah	Sobhan Babu, Jayasudha, Jayachitra	
Thoorpu Padamara	Dasari Narayana Rao	Narasimha Raju, Srividya, Madhavi	
Vemulawada Bheemakavi	D. Yoganand	NTR, Nandamuri Balakrishna	
Vintha Illu Santha Gola	Kosaraju Raghavaiah	Chandra Mohan, Sarath Babu, Prabha, Jayamalini, Rama Prabha, Lakshmi Deepak	
Yavvanam Katesindi	Dasari Narayana Rao	Krishnam Raju, Jayachitra, Murali Mohan	
