= Nidumolu Sumathi =

Indian percussionist

- Also known as: Dandamudi Sumathi
- Born: Eluru, Andhra Pradesh, India
- Occupation: Musician
- Instrument: Mridangam
- Spouse: Dandamudi Ramamohan Rao

Nidumolu Sumathi (born 16 October 1950), also known as Dandamudi Sumathi, is an Indian percussionist, primarily playing the mridangam. She is married to "Mridangam Maestro" Dandamudi Ramamohan Rao. She is one of the first female mridangam players in India, and the first female Laya Vinyasam artist. Sumathi received India's fourth-highest civilian award, Padma Shri, in 2021.

== Early life ==
Dandamudi Sumathi Ram Mohan Rao was born on 16 October 1950 in Eluru, West Godavari district, Andhra Pradesh. Her parents were Sri Nidumolu Raghavaiah and Smt.Nidumolu Venkataratnamma. At age six Sumathi started learning mridangam from her father who was a mridangam vidwan. He took her to concerts and supported her interest in percussion. She gave her first performance at age 10. In 1964, after completing a certificate and diploma course in mridangam, she studied under Sri Dandamudi Ram Mohan Rao. She learned many intricate techniques from her guru and started giving performances.

In 2003, she became an "A-TOP" grade artist of All India Radio. She was the first female mridangist to achieve this grade. She and her spouse became the only A-TOP grade mridangam duo and gave laya vinyasam concerts. She rose from an accompanying artist to become a solo performer. Many of her programmes were broadcast/telecast. Synchronizing left and right, she plays with mellifluous melody with excellent balance in sruthi and laya.

She accompanied artists including M.S.Subbalakshmi, Chittoor Subramaniam Pillai, Voleti Venkateswarlu, Dr. M.Balamurali Krishna, Pt. Bhimsen Joshi, M.Chandrasekaran, Emani Sankara Sastri, Chitti Babu, N. Ramani, and U.Srinivas.

In 2000, she established Laya Vedika, an organization promoting the mridangam, conducting competitions for students, and conferring the title "Laya Praveena" to accomplished vidwans. In 2011, Nidumolu and her organization unveiled a bronze statue of Sri Ram Mohan Rao in Tummalapalli Kshetrayya Kalakshetram, Vijayawada on the first anniversary of his death. In

2015, she conducted a program named Satha Mridanga Vadya Nivali, as a tribute to her guru/husband with a group of 100 mridangam artists for the first time. This program appeared in records of Telugu Book of Records.

== Personal life ==
She married her guru Sri Dandamudi Rama Mohan Rao.

== Recognition ==
She received many awards and was celebrated in many sabhas. She received the Kendra Sangeet Natak Akademi award from the President of India in 2010—the only lady mridangam artist to receive it. She was honoured with "Ugadi Puraskaram" from the government of Andhra Pradesh in 2015.

The Government of India awarded her the "Padma Shri", India's fourth highest civilian award, in 2021.

=== Awards and honours ===
- Best Mridangist Award from Madras Music Academy, twice in 1974, 1976
- Palani Subramania Pillai Memorial Prize from Music Academy in 1985
- Best Mridangist Award from Indian Fine Arts Society, Chennai in 2005
- Best Citizens of India Award from International Publishing House, New Delhi in 2008
- Kendra Sangeet Natak Akademi Award for the year 2009
- Guruvayur Dorai Trust Award from Guruvayur Dorai Trust, Chennai in 2013
- Ugadi Puraskaram from the government of Andhra Pradesh in 2015
- Palani Subramanya Pillai Memorial Award in 2016 from Percussive Arts Centre, Bangalore in 2016
- Padma Shri in 2021

=== Honorary titles ===
- Mridanga Siromani
- Mridanga Maharani
- Nadha Bhageeratha
- Mridangalaya Vidyasagara
- Mridanga Vinyasa Kalabharathi
- Sunada Sudhanidhi
- Srimukha Mridanga Vidwanmani
- Gayathri Sangeetha Vidwanmani
- Naadhalaya Samraagni
