= Nandi Awards of 1977 =

Indian Telugu film and TV awards ceremony

Nandi Awards were presented annually by Government of Andhra Pradesh. The awards were first presented in 1964.

The recipients of the best film awards in 1977 were the following:

== 1977 Nandi Awards Winners ==
Category	Winner	Film
Best Feature Film	No award given	
Second Best Feature Film	Singeetam Srinivasa Rao	Tharam Marindi
Third Best Feature Film	Mrinal Sen	Oka Oori Katha
