= Devayani (disambiguation) =

Devayani is a character in the ancient Indian epic Mahabharta, the daughter of the deity Shukra.

Devayani may also refer to:

- Devayani or Devasena, a Hindu goddess, the consort of god Kartikeya
- Devayani (actress) (born 1973), an Indian actress in Tamil cinema
- Devayani (dancer), an Indian Bharatanatyam dancer
- Devyani Khobragade, an Indian diplomat
  - Devyani Khobragade incident, a 2013 incident involving her in New York City
