= Sathya Sundharam =

- Poster
- Directed by: K. S. Rao
- Written by: K. S. Rao, Aroor Das (dialogues)
- Produced by: B. Vijayalakshmi, B. Udhayakumar
- Starring: Sivaji Ganesan; K. R. Vijaya; Jai Ganesh; Suruli Rajan
- Cinematography: G. Or. Nathan
- Edited by: B. Kanthasamy
- Music by: M. S. Viswanathan
- Production company: Balakrishna Productions
- Release date: 21 February 1981
- Country: India
- Language: Tamil

Sathya Sundharam is a 1981 Indian Tamil-language film directed by Kommineni Seshagiri Rao. The film stars Sivaji Ganesan, K. R. Vijaya, Jai Ganesh and Suruli Rajan. It is a remake of Telugu film Tayaramma Bangarayya. The film was released on 21 February 1981.

== Plot ==
A couple, Sathya and Sundaram, dedicate themselves to resolving disputes for various people. They address conflicts affecting two families, and in the climax, their true motives for offering their services are revealed. The film concludes with both families reconciling and living happily, while Satya and Sundaram set out to help other families facing disputes.

== Cast ==
- Sivaji Ganesan as Sundaram
- K. R. Vijaya as Sathya
- Jai Ganesh
- Suruli Rajan
- V. K. Ramasamy
- V. S. Raghavan
- Vijayakumar as Madhu
- Sripriya as Vani
- Madhavi as Lakshmi
- Anuradha
- Nalinikanth
- S. Varalakshmi as Papathi Amma

== Soundtrack ==
Soundtrack was composed by M. S. Viswanathan and the songs were penned by Kannadasan & Vaali.

Song	Singers	
"Ada Appan Mavane"	T. M. Soundararajan	Kannadasan
"Azhagiya Pengal"	S. P. Balasubrahmanyam, Vani Jairam	Kannadasan
"My Name is Sundaramoorthy"	T. M. Soundararajan, P. Susheela	Kannadasan
"Oorukku Nalladhoru"	T. M. Soundararajan, P. Susheela	Vaali

== Reception ==
Nalini Sastry of Kalki wrote that the film presented an old story in a bit different manner while praising the acting of Ganesan and Vijaya and found Rao's direction and Viswanathan's music as not bad.
