= Rudranetra =

- Poster
- Directed by: K. Raghavendra Rao
- Written by: Yandamuri Veerendranath
- Screenplay by: K. Raghavendra Rao
- Produced by: B. H. Varahanarasimha Raju
- Starring: Chiranjeevi; Vijayashanti; Radha; Rekha; Rao Gopal Rao; Raghuvaran; Raza Murad; Ranganath; Kaikala Satyanarayana
- Cinematography: K. S. Prakash
- Edited by: Kotagiri Venkateswara Rao
- Music by: Ilaiyaraaja
- Distributed by: Sri Kalyana Venkateshwara Movies
- Release date: 16 June 1989
- Country: India
- Language: Telugu

Rudranetra is a 1989 Telugu-language spy film directed by K. Raghavendra Rao. The film was written by Yandamuri Veerendranath and stars Chiranjeevi, Vijayashanti, Radha, and Rao Gopal Rao. The film was dubbed into Hindi as Secret Agent Raja. The soundtrack, composed by Ilaiyaraaja, was a hit. The film is based on conspiracy theories and was a box office hit.

== Synopsis ==
Agent Netra (Chiranjeevi), is a Casanova who works for a detective agency run by Satyanarayana (Ranganath). He is assigned to track down the underworld activities of a bigwig who leads the Illegal drug trade. He uses his elder daughter Rekha to experiment on his drugs. Netra reaches a hideout followed by a fight sequence. Netra is shown to have died in a fire.

Agent Vijayasanthi is in love with Netra and takes up his mission. She arrives in the village where Netra died and meets Yadagiri, a double of Netra (actually Netra himself) as a servant at her guest house. He saves her from drowning and he reveals how he escaped. They join forces.

Vijayasanthi's grandma unknowingly misplaces the photos of sisters Hamsa Lekha and Swarna Rekha. Vijayasanthi suggests to Netra that they trap Rekha to learn of the activities, but unaware of the photo confusion, she gives him a pic of Radha instead. Netra traps Radha and she falls in love with him. Netra and Vijayasanthi travel to Malaysia trying to reach the roots of the underworld. The bigwig reveals that Rekha is not his own daughter and that he had experimented on and killed her. Radha is unable to withstand her father's cruelty and tries to shoot him, but he escapes. Netra and Vijayasanthi attack the villains and destroy their lair. Vijayasanthi and Radha become good friends and the three of them unite to end the story.

== Cast ==
- Chiranjeevi as Rudranetra alias Netra
- Vijayashanti as Vijaya
- Radha as Hamsalekha
- Rekha as Swarnarekha
- Rao Gopal Rao as Sarpa Bhushana Rao
- Raghuvaran as Mr. Q
- Raza Murad as Black Eagle
- Nutan Prasad
- Brahmanandam
- Ranganath

== Soundtrack ==
Music Rights of the film were acquired by Aditya Music.

All music is composed by Ilaiyaraaja.

Track Listing
No.	Title	Singer(s)	Length
1.	"Abbabbabba"	S. P. Balasubrahmanyam, K. S. Chithra
2.	"Andamivvu"	S. P. Balasubrahmanyam, K. S. Chithra
3.	"Ek Do Theen"	S. P. Balasubrahmanyam, K. S. Chithra
4.	"Jettu Speedu"	S. P. Balasubrahmanyam, K. S. Chithra
5.	"Khajuraho"	S. P. Balasubrahmanyam, K. S. Chithra
6.	"L Ante O Ante"	S. P. Balasubrahmanyam, K. S. Chithra
