= Dharma Devathai =

1986 film by S. P. Muthuraman

- Theatrical release poster
- Directed by: S. P. Muthuraman
- Screenplay by: V. C. Guhanathan
- Story by: Paruchuri brothers
- Produced by: M. Saravanan; M. Balasubramanian
- Starring: Vijayakanth; Sarath Babu; Radhika; Pallavi
- Cinematography: T. S. Vinayakam
- Edited by: R. Vittal; S. B. Mohan
- Music by: Raveendran
- Production company: AVM Productions
- Release date: 1 November 1986
- Country: India
- Language: Tamil

Dharma Devathai (/ðərməðeɪvəðaɪ/ transl. Angel of Justice) is a 1986 Indian Tamil-language action drama film directed by S. P. Muthuraman and produced by AVM Productions. The film stars Vijayakanth, Sarath Babu, Radhika and Pallavi. It is a remake of the 1986 Telugu film Prathidhwani. The film was released on 1 November 1986, and Radhika won the Filmfare Award for Best Actress – Tamil.

== Plot ==
Chandrasekhar, a strong-willed union leader in a factory, faces constant angry opposition to his campaign for workers' rights from Azhagusundaram. When Chandrasekhar ends up murdered, his brother Vijay and widow Jhansi seek revenge.

== Cast ==
- Vijayakanth as Vijay
- Sarath Babu as Chandrasekhar
- Radhika as Jhansi
- Pallavi as Rekha
- M. N. Nambiar as Kathiresan
- Jai Ganesh as Azhagusundaram
- Thengai Srinivasan as Chandrasekhar and Vijay's father
- Y. G. Mahendran
- Delhi Ganesh as Paramasivan
- Disco Shanti as item Dancer

== Soundtrack ==
The music was composed by Raveendran, with lyrics by Vaali.

Track listing
No.	Title	Singer(s)	Length
1.	"Oorukku Uzhaithan"	K. J. Yesudas	2:38
2.	"Desathin Theeratha Avamana"	Malaysia Vasudevan	5:51
3.	"Thodu Thodu Vaa Mella"	K. J. Yesudas, S. Janaki	4:24
4.	"Mamave Ne Kanna Vecha Kaia Vecha"	S. P. Balasubrahmanyam, S. Janaki	4:26
5.	"Edhu Natta Nadu Rathiri"	S. Janaki	4:59
Total length:			22:18

== Release and reception ==
Dharma Devathai was released on 1 November 1986 alongside another Vijayakanth starrer Thazhuvatha Kaigal. The Indian Express wrote, "Dharma Devadhai, loud formula laden drama that it is, is quite safe, one supposes". Kalki said the film could be watched for the songs and action more than the story. Balumani of Anna praised the acting, music and direction. At the 34th Filmfare Awards South, Radhika won the Filmfare Award for Best Actress – Tamil.
