= Moguds Pellams =

- మొగుడ్స్ పెళ్ళామ్స్
- Directed by: Ranganath
- Written by: B. Nageswara Rao (dialogues)
- Screenplay by: Ranganath
- Story by: Ranganath
- Produced by: Vemuri Ramakoteswara Rao
- Starring: Sivaji Raja; Rathi
- Edited by: Vemuri Ravi
- Music by: S. Raj Kiran
- Release date: 29 October 2005
- Country: India
- Language: Telugu

Moguds Pellams is a 2005 Indian Telugu language film directed by actor Ranganath who made his directorial debut and was his only directorial. The film stars Sivaji Raja and Rathi.

== Summary ==
Two strangers meet each other while traveling from their native place to find a job in the city. To find an accommodation, they pretend to be a married couple. With time, they are attracted to each other, but are hesitant to admit their feelings to each other. Finally, however, they unite.

== Cast ==
- Sivaji Raja as Srinivas
- Rathi as Padmavathi
- Karthik
- Harika
- Chandra Mohan
- M. S. Narayana
- Annapoorna
- L. B. Sriram
- Raghu Babu
- Sana
- Satyam Rajesh
- Duvvasi Mohan

== Awards ==
- Nitya Santoshini won Nandi Award for Best Female Playback Singer for the song "Ninne Daachanu"
