= Dandamudi Ramamohan Rao =

Indian mridangam exponent (1933–2011)

- Born: 18 March 1933; Vuyyuru, British India (present-day Andhra Pradesh)
- Died: 31 January 2011 (aged 77); Vijayawada, Andhra Pradesh
- Citizenship: British Indian (1933-1947); Indian (1947-2011)
- Occupation: instrumentalist
- Spouse: Nidumolu Sumathi
- Awards: Sangeet Natak Akademi Award (1994)
- Musical career
- Genres: Carnatic music
- Instrument: Mridangam

Dandamudi Ramamohan Rao (18 March 1933 – 31 January 2011), also known as Dandamudi Ramamohana Rao, was an Indian mridangam player. He received the Kala Praveena title from the Andhra Pradesh Sangeet Natak Academy in 1981 and the Sangeet Natak Akademi Award for mridangam from Sangeet Natak Akademi, Government of India in 1994.

== Biography ==
Dandamudi Ramamohan Rao was born on 18 March 1933, in Vuyyuru in present-day Andhra Pradesh. He began learning the mridangam at the age of six. An exponent of the Pudukottai style of mridangam, he received training from eminent musicians such as K. Ranganayakulu, Potluri Veeraraghava Chowdhury, Tirupati Ramanuja Suri, Edara Nagaraju and Palani Subramaniam Pillai. He gave his first concert in 1939. Along with the mridangam, he has also mastered the Kanjira and Morsing.

His wife, Nidumolu Sumathi, a renowned mridangam player, was first his student and later his co-performer.

He died on 31 January 2011 at Vijayawada.

== Career ==
In his mridangam career spanning over five decades, other than solo mridangam concerts, Dandamudi has played the mridangam alongside many accomplished Carnatic musicians.

Dandamudi served as a staff artist at All India Radio, Vijayawada for five decades, retiring from there in 1993.

Dandamudi, who was also a mridangam teacher, had disciples including his wife Nidumolu Sumathi, M. Lakshminarayana Raju, Pulledikurthi Rama Rao, A. Krishnamohan Sathya Narayanan, M. Mokkapathi Nageswara Rao, and M. Balamuralikrishna.

== Awards and honors ==
In 1981, Dandamudi received the title Kala Praveena from the Andhra Pradesh Sangeetha Nataka Academy. He received the Sangeet Natak Akademi Award for mridangam in 1994.
