= 34th Filmfare Awards South =

Award ceremony for South Indian films

- Date: 9 August 1987
- Site: Music Academy Madras, Tamil Nadu, India
- Hosted by: Revathi Sowcar Janaki and A. R. Srinivasan

The 34th Filmfare Awards South ceremony honouring the winners of the best of South Indian cinema in 1986 is an event held on 9 August 1987 at Madras. The Chief guests of the function is the minister of Information Karnataka Mr. M. P. Prakash and Thikkurissy Sukumaran Nair. The Filmfare winners list announced on July 16, 1987.

== Awards ==
=== Main awards ===
==== Kannada cinema ====
Best Film	Best Director
Bhagyada Lakshmi Baramma	K. V. Jayaram - Hosa Neeru
Best Actor	Best Actress
Rajkumar- Bhagyada Lakshmi Baramma	Saritha - Mouna Geethe

==== Malayalam cinema ====
Best Film	Best Director
Vartha	Hariharan - Panchagni
Best Actor	Best Actress
Mohanlal - Sanmanassullavarkku Samadhanam	Shari - Namukku Parkkan Munthiri Thoppukal

==== Tamil cinema ====
Best Film	Best Director
Samsaram Adhu Minsaram	Mani Ratnam -Mouna Raagam
Best Actor	Best Actress
Vijayakanth - Amman Kovil Kizhakale	Radhika -Dharma Devathai

==== Telugu cinema ====
Best Film	Best Director
Repati Pourulu	K. Viswanath - Swati Mutyam
Best Actor	Best Actress
Krishnam Raju- Tandra Paparayudu; Kamal Haasan - Swati Mutyam	Lakshmi - Sravana Meghalu; Radhika - Swati Mutyam; Suhasini - Sirivennela

=== Special awards ===
For Outstanding Contribution to South Indian Films
- Thikkurissy Sukumaran Nair
For Outstanding Achievement as a Playback Singer
- S. P. Balasubrahmanyam

== Awards Presentation ==
- Parvathamma Rajkumar (Best Film Kannada) Received Award from Shobana
- P. V. Gangadharan (Best Film Malayalam) Received Award from Gemini Ganesan
- P. Venkateswara Rao (Best Film Telugu) Received Award from S. P. Muthuraman
- M. Saravanan (Best Film Tamil) Received Award from K. Balachander
- K. V. Jayaram (Best Director Kannada) Received Award from Seema
- Hariharan (Best Director Malayalam) Received Award from Charuhasan
- S. P. Balasubrahmanyam Receives K. Viswanath Award (Best Director Telugu) from Revathi
- Mani Ratnam (Best Director Tamil) Received Award from Balu Mahendra
- Saritha (Best Actress Kannada) Received Award from Jaya Prada
- Shari (Best Actress Malayalam) Received Award from Raghuvaran
- Lakshmi (actress) (Best Actress Telugu) Received Award from Sheela
- Radhika (Best Actress Tamil) Received Award from Suhasini
- Raghavendra Rajkumar Receives Rajkumar Award (Best Actor Kannada) from Deepa
- Krishnam Raju (Best Actor Telugu) Received Award from Thikkurissy Sukumaran Nair
- Vijayakanth (Best Actor Tamil) Received Award from Sivakumar
- Thikkurissy Sukumaran Nair (For Outstanding Contribution to South Indian Films) Received Award from Thirunavukkarasu
- S. P. Balasubrahmanyam (For Outstanding Achievement as a Playback Singer) Received Award from M. P. Prakash
