= G. Anand =

Indian singer (died 2021)

- Born: February 16th, 1944; Tulagam, Srikakulam district, Andhra Pradesh, India
- Died: 6 May 2021 (aged 77)
- Genres: Indian music, playback singing, composer
- Occupations: Singer, composer
- Years active: 1972–1990
- Labels: swaramadhuri

Gedela Ananda Rao (February 16, 1944 - May 6, 2021), commonly known as G. Anand or by his stage name Swaramadhuri, was an Indian Telugu playback singer. He was renowned for his performances with the troupe 'Swara Madhuri,' which entertained audiences globally. Throughout his career, he delivered over 6500 musical performances.

== Early life and career ==
Anand was born in Tulagam village in Srikakulam, a district in the state of Andhra Pradesh in India. He learned music from his father, who was a stage drama artist. His family often performed together in mythological dramas, with his father playing the role of Lord Rama, and Anand and his brother playing the roles of Lord Rama's sons Luv and Kush. Anand began his singing career by performing at festivals and functions in neighboring villages. He participated in numerous competitions, winning several prizes. On one such occasion, he was declared the winner by renowned music director K. V. Mahadevan and singer S. P. Balasubrahmanyam. Following the competition, K. V. Mahadevan promised to give Anand an opportunity in the film industry.

Following his first performance, he resided in Madras at the home of the late Leelaraani. Later, he moved in with Medisetty Apparao and Sarathbabu. During a function hosted by actor Chandramohan, Sri Navatha Krishnamraju heard him sing and subsequently introduced him to Venkatesh. Impressed by his singing, Venkatesh promised to help him secure a singing opportunity. They sent him to collect lyrics from Devulapalli Krishna Sastry. After a week, Devulapalli was impressed with his voice and provided a recommendation letter to K. V. Mahadevan. This led to his debut singing the song "Oka Venuvu Vinipinchenu" in the movie America Ammayi.

== Death ==
Anand died, aged 77, from COVID-19.

== Discography ==
- 1972: Pandanti Kapuram (Telugu:పండంటి కాపురం)
- 1976: America Ammayi (Telugu:అమెరికా అమ్మాయి)
- 1977: Aame Katha (Telugu:ఆమె కథ)
- 1977: Kalpana (Telugu:కల్పన)
- 1977: Dana Veera Sura Karna (Telugu:దాన వీర శూర కర్ణ)
- 1977: Chakradhari (Telugu:చక్రధారి)
- 1977: Bangarakka (Telugu:బంగారక్క)
- 1978: Manavoori Pandavulu (Telugu:మన ఊరి పాండవులు)
- 1978: Pranam Khareedu (Telugu:ప్రాణం ఖరీదు)
- 1979: Tayaramma Bangarayya (Telugu:తాయారమ్మ బంగారయ్య)
- 1987: Gandhinagar Rendava Veedhi (Teluguvగాంధీనగర్ రెండవ వీధి) music director
- 1987: Swatanthryaniki Upiri Poyyandi (Telugu:స్వాతంత్ర్యానికి ఊపిరి పొయ్యండి) music director
- 1990: Rangavalli (Telugu:రంగవల్లి) music director
