= Tayaramma Bangarayya =

- Poster of Tayaramma Bangarayya
- Directed by: Kommineni Seshagiri Rao
- Written by: Kommineni Seshagiri Rao (story / screenplay)
- Dialogue by: Jandhyala
- Produced by: Edida Nageswara Rao; Aakasam Sriramulu
- Starring: Kaikala Satyanarayana; Sowcar Janaki
- Cinematography: P. Bhaskar Rao
- Music by: Chakravarthy
- Release date: 12 January 1979
- Country: India
- Language: Telugu

Tayaramma Bangarayya is a 1979 Indian Telugu-language film written and directed by Kommineni Seshagiri Rao. The film stars Sowcar Janaki as Tayaramma and Kaikala Satyanarayana as Bangarayya. Chandra Mohan, Ranganath, Madhavi, Sangeetha play supporting characters. Chiranjeevi makes a guest appearance in the film.

Released on 12 January 1979, the film was commercially successful. It was remade in Tamil as Sathya Sundharam (1981) with Sivaji Ganesan in the lead role and in Hindi as Shrimaan Shrimati (1982) with Sanjeev Kumar as the lead.

== Plot ==
The film is about a good samaritan couple Tayaramma (Janaki) and Bangarayya (Satyanarayana). They try to repair the marriages of young couples. They successfully do this as a social responsibility. When contrasting personalities Aruna (Madhavi) and Vani (Sangeetha) get married and have problems in their married life with husbands Chandra Mohan and Ranganath respectively, Tayaramma and Bangarayya step in.

== Cast ==
- Kaikala Satyanarayana as Bangarayya
- Sowcar Janaki as Tayaramma
- Chandra Mohan as Madhu
- Ranganath as Sudhakar
- Madhavi as Aruna
- Sangeetha as Vani
- Dubbing Janaki as Vani's Mother
- Chhaya Devi as Ranganath's mother
- Rajababu as Kotayya
- Allu Ramalingaiah as Aruna's Father
- Sarath Babu as Gopala Krishna
- Chiranjeevi

== Soundtrack ==
| No. | Title | Lyrics | Music | Singer(s) | Length |
|---|---|---|---|---|---|
| 1. | "Aanaadu Eenaadu" | Acharya Athreya | K.V. Mahadevan | G.Anand, P. Susheela | 3:33 |
| 2. | "Ore ore ooru kora" | Acharya Athreya | K.V. Mahadevan | S. P. Balasubrahmanyam | 3:20 |
| 3. | "Gudise Peeki Medameedha Veyyali" | Acharya Athreya | K.V. Mahadevan | S.P. Balasubrahmanyam | 4:26 |
| 4. | "My Name is Bangarayya" | Veturi | K.V. Mahadevan | P. Susheela, S.P. Balasubrahmanyam | 5:06 |
| Total length: | | | | | 16:20 |
