= Chitti Babu (musician) =

Indian musician (1936–1996)

- Born: 13 October 1936; Cocanada, Madras Presidency, British India (now Kakinada, Andhra Pradesh, India)
- Died: 9 February 1996 (aged 59); Madras (now Chennai), Tamil Nadu, India
- Occupation: Musician
- Years active: 1948–1996
- Website: www.veenachittibabu.org

Chitti Babu (13 October 1936 – 9 February 1996) was a classical musician from India, and arguably one of the greatest Veena artistes, in the Carnatic Music genre of South India, who became a legend in his own lifetime. His name was synonymous with the musical instrument veena, and he became known in the Carnatic Music world simply as Veena Chitti Babu.

== Early childhood and career ==
Chitti Babu Challapally (surname) was born on 13 October 1936, in Kakinada, Andhra Pradesh, India, to music-loving parents, Ranga Rao Challapally and Sundaramma Challapally, who had initially named him Hanumanlu, when he was born. Chitti Babu was his nickname at home, which came to stay eventually, after his father formally changed it to be so. He was a child prodigy who started playing Veena at the age of 5. He had a providential beginning, when at that early age, he corrected his father playing the Veena and the stunned father spontaneously decided to get him started on the Veena and nurture the child's inherent prodigious talent. Chitti Babu gave his first performance at the age of 12. He had his earliest basic lessons from Shri. Pandravada Upmakaya and also Shri Eyyuni Appalacharyulu and later was a prime disciple of MahaMahopadhyaya Dr Emani Sankara Sastry.

In 1948, they moved to Madras (now Chennai) primarily because they got the opportunity for Chitti Babu to act in a Telugu movie "Laila- Majnu" as a child artiste who played the role of little Majnu. The movie was produced by Bhanumathi Ramakrishna and starred herself and Akkineni Nageswara Rao in the lead roles, both of whom became thespians eventually. The movie was a hit and he had also starred in a small role in another movie as well.

However, Chitti Babu even as a child of 12, was very focused and determined on becoming a performing classical musician, after the movie assignment. He was inspired by the original style of Veena maestro Emani Sankara Sastry and was under his tutelage, learning all the nuances and honing his skills.

== Film and music ==
Like any upcoming young artiste of that era, it was difficult to get major breaks as a performing artiste, and more so as a teenager. He spent a period as a Veena artiste, in film music from 1948 to 1962, working in the South Indian Film Industry as a recording artiste, playing Veena for numerous background scores in movie soundtracks under directors such as S. Rajeswara Rao, Pendyala Nageswara Rao, G. Devarajan and the duo of Viswanathan-Ramamoorthi. His performances were included in many successful songs of that time period in Telugu and Tamil.

After having established himself as a Carnatic musician, Chitti Babu still had opportunity to associate himself with filmdom for a while.

Some of his key works include:

– Playing the Veena soundtrack in Director CV Sridhar's classic Tamil movie called Kalai Kovil in 1964. The protagonist of this movie R. Muthuraman was a Veena artiste, and the entire background score for the Veena was played and recorded by Chitti Babu. This movie received wide critical acclaim for its music and storyline and performances by the artistes.

– Playing the kriti "Raghuvamsa Sudha" as the Title Soundtrack for the very famous Telugu classical hit movie called Sampoorna Ramayanam directed by Bapu

– He was music director for Singeetham Srinivasa Rao's award-winning film Dikkatra Parvathi (1974) – based a story by Rajaji and lyrics by the legendary Kannadasan. A song sung by Vani Jairam – "Aagaayam Mazhai Pozhindaal" was a popular number in its time.

– In 1979, he had also composed music for a Kannada movie called "Sri Raghavendra Mahime" that was also dubbed into Telugu.

However, the burning ambition inside him to continue to establish himself as an independent, freelancing solo concert artiste made him declare at a very young age – "Veena is my Mission in Life" and caused him to pursue a lifelong career as a performing artiste, a goal from which he never wavered for the rest of his life.

== His Playing Style or "Bani" ==
While continuing with the principles of his Guru's pioneering school, the Emani "Bani" (tradition/style), Chitti Babu, created and evolved a distinctive style and identity. The tonal quality and versatility that have been his style of playing the Veena, saw him produce both varied and delicate sounds, even playing many western-music based compositions of his own.

His music attracted wide range of listeners, which invoked the interest of both the youngsters and experienced critics, that ensured that his concerts had high attendance of audience.

== Awards and recognition ==
Throughout his glittering career, he won many accolades regularly from almost all major cultural organizations in India and abroad. Many had also conferred numerous honorary titles on him (as is traditional to honor someone in India) and were presented to him by senior artistes, government officials, and other eminent people of his time, from all walks of life. Some of the more well-known ones are:

- Sangeet Natak Akademi award for 1990 – awarded by the prestigious Sangeet Natak Akademi in New Delhi and presented by Shri R. Venkataraman – the then President of India
- Kalaimamani – 1972 – Prestigious Award from Government of Tamil Nadu presented by the then Chief Minister of Tamil Nadu Shri Karunanidhi
- Asthana Vidwan – Tirumala Tirupathi Devasthanams
- State Artiste – Government of Tamil Nadu – 1981–1987, presented by Shri MG Ramachandran, then Chief Minister of Tamil Nadu
- Telugu Velugu – Government of Andhra Pradesh, presented by Shri Tanguturi Anjaiah, then Chief Minister of Andhra Pradesh in 1981
- Tantri Vilas – Government of Madhya Pradesh
- Spirit of Excellence Award in 1991–92 presented by the then Vice President of India Shri Shankar Dayal Sharma
- Sangeetha Choodamani – Krishna Gana Sabha – 1990
- Sangeetha Kala Nipuna – Mylapore Fine Arts Club – 1995

Chief among those was the title "Vainika Shikhamani" in 1967 presented by the then Maharajah of Mysore, Shri Jayachamarajendra Wodeyar, who on hearing Chitti Babu, in an exclusive performance at his palace, was so impressed by his versatility that, he removed a golden chain that he was personally wearing around his neck at the time, and presented it to Chitti Babu in a spontaneous gesture of appreciation. The chain also happened to have a gem-studded, gold pendant. Chitti Babu cherished this because Wodeyar was known to have been a great connoisseur of arts and music, and was also known as "a musician among princes and a prince among musicians".

== Concert tours ==
Chitti Babu was a much sought-after artiste by music lovers, all his life, and had toured extensively in India and the world over including concert tours in USA, Europe, USSR, Bahrain, Muscat, Malaysia, Singapore, Sri Lanka, Philippines, Japan and Australia. He has represented India in various international music festivals including Donaueschingen Festival in 1971 in West Germany, Festival of India in USSR in 1987 and the Tokyo Summer Festival with the theme "Visions of India" organized by Arion-Edo Foundation in 1993 in Tokyo, Japan to name a few.

== Death ==
Chitti Babu died after a massive cardiac arrest on 9 February 1996 at the age of 59 in Chennai.
