= Samyuktha =

1988 Indian Kannada-language thriller mystery film

- Poster
- Directed by: K. N. Chandrashekar Sharma
- Screenplay by: Chi. Udayashankar; Singeetam Srinivasa Rao
- Story by: Kakolu Saroja Rao
- Produced by: S. A. Govindaraj; V. Bharath Raj
- Starring: Shiva Rajkumar; Veena; Chi Guru Dutt; Balaraj
- Cinematography: V. K. Kannan
- Edited by: P. G. Mohan
- Music by: Singeetam Srinivasa Rao (songs); Shankar–Ganesh (background score)
- Production company: Nirupama Art Combines
- Release date: 26 May 1988
- Running time: 126 minutes
- Country: India
- Language: Kannada

Samyuktha is a 1988 Indian Kannada-language thriller film directed by K. N. Chandrashekar Sharma. The story is based on a novel of same name by Kakolu Saroja Rao. The film stars Shiva Rajkumar, Balaraj, Chi Guru Dutt and debutant actress Veena. The film was widely appreciated for its songs and story upon release. The songs composed by Singeetam Srinivasa Rao were huge hits. Singeetam also co-wrote the screenplay for this movie. The background score was composed by Shankar–Ganesh.

In an episode in Weekend with Ramesh, Shiva Rajkumar had revealed that initially the movie was supposed to have only 2 protagonists – Chi Guru Dutt and Balaraj as in the original novel. However, he was later on board to give credibility to the project.

== Plot ==
Three youngsters Shivaraj aka Shivu, Balaraj aka Balu and Gururaj aka Guru arrive in Saligrama to work in a factory owned by Mohan Rao, with the influence of the Home Minister. They all stay at factory manager Gopal Rao's house upon Gopal Rao's insistence. Shivu falls for Devi, Gopal Rao's sister. They travel across the village where they learn about a desolated house, which is haunted by the ghost of Mohan Rao's deceased wife Samyuktha. They decide to investigate, but Devi disagrees with them and reveals that her brother-in-law Sadanand, who is a police inspector went towards the house to investigate but went missing. Mohan Rao arrives from Delhi and grants them jobs where he also makes them stay at Samyuktha's house to scare them away from the village as Mohan Rao feels that they are irresponsible persons.

The trio shift to the bungalow and experience paranormal activities: When Balu was returning from a theatre with his girlfriend Pramila, he hears sounds of a woman singing, deducing it is a Mohini he escapes from the forest to the bungalow. They also realise that someone has been following them. One night, they hear the same song, find a woman and follow her. She tries to commit suicide, but Shivu saves her only to find that she is Devi's sister Radha, who reveals that she followed Sadanand to the bungalow, only to find him disappeared which results in Radha sinking into depression. The trio checks Samyuktha's room for clues, but to no avail. Balu wakes up to drink water and finds a horrific ghost in front of their room. The ghost escapes making the trio deduce that someone is trying to scare them by using Ghost tactics.

After completing their work at night, the trio are attacked by goons, but they manage to defeat them. Balu gets knocked out in the process. Devi arrives at the bungalow to meet the trio, only to see the ghost and escapes from there until Shivu arrives and chases the ghost. He throws a knife at the ghost and finds blood stains where the knife hit its target, confirming their suspicion. At Devi's friend Shashirekha's birthday, Guru goes missing and they deduce that he has been kidnapped. In the morning, Shivu and Balu finds Guru's camera where they find the photo of the priest, who prays at a Gudi near the bungalow is involved in the paranormal activities. They follow him at night, but the priest sees them and a chase ensues where the priest disappears. The next morning, Shivu and Balu find the priest dead and his body hanging from the tree.

They deduce that the priest disappeared from the temple and at night they check the temple and finds some dotted snake puzzle and solve it which leads to a tunnel, only to find that the base is actually an illegal arms den. Shivu and Balu attack the culprits and frees Guru and Sadanand (who is alive) and also confront the ghost, who reveals that Gopal Rao is behind Samyuktha's death and arms smuggling. Samyuktha had learnt about Gopal Rao's smuggling business which leads to Gopal Rao chocking Samyuktha to death and made it look like a suicide, He only spared Sadanand as he is Radha's husband. Shivu, Balu and Guru confronts Gopal Rao, who reveal themselves as undercover officers, who are assigned by Mohan Rao to solve the case. A chase and shootout ensues at a factory where Shivu, Balu and Guru manages to catch Gopal Rao and arrest him. After this, Shivu-Devi, Balu-Pramila, Guru-Shashirekha embarks on a road trip at the hillside.

== Cast ==
- Shiva Rajkumar as Shivaraj aka Shivu
- Roopadevi as Samyuktha (Guest appearance)
- Veena as Devi
- Chi Guru Dutt as Gururaj aka Guru
- Balaraj as Balaraj aka Balu
- K. S. Ashwath as Veerabhadraiah
- Sundar Krishna Urs as Mohan Rao, Samyuktha's husband
- Avinash as Gopal Rao, Devi's brother
- Shivaram as Purushotthama Rao
- Honnavalli Krishna
- Sudha Narasimharaju
- Sadashiva Brahmavar as temple priest
- Devaraj in guest appearance as Gopal Rao's brother-in-law
- Sundar Raj
- Kunigal Ramanath
- Negro Johnny

== Soundtrack ==
The songs of the film were composed by Singeetam Srinivasa Rao.

All lyrics are written by Chi. Udaya Shankar.

Track listing
No.	Title	Singer(s)	Length
1.	"Ee Namma Naade"	S. P. Balasubrahmanyam, Mano, Ramesh
2.	"Preethiyo Premavo Mohavo"	S. P. Balasubrahmanyam, Vani Jairam
3.	"Aakasha Baagide"	S. P. Balasubrahmanyam
4.	"Mysoorinalli Mallige"	S. P. Balasubrahmanyam
5.	"Thangaaliyagi Hode"	S. Janaki

== Legacy ==
Abhiram titled his 2017 film Samyuktha 2, which has no similarity with this film.
