= Sommokadidhi Sokokadidhi =

1979 film by Singeetam Srinivasa Rao

- Poster
- Directed by: Singeetam Srinivasa Rao
- Screenplay by: Singeetam Srinivasa Rao
- Dialogue by: Jandhyala
- Story by: S. L. Kalyani
- Produced by: B. Radha Manohari
- Starring: Kamal Haasan; Jayasudha; Rojaramani
- Cinematography: Balu Mahendra
- Edited by: D. Vasu
- Music by: Rajan–Nagendra
- Production company: SBS Films
- Release date: 5 January 1979
- Running time: 140 minutes
- Country: India
- Language: Telugu

Sommokadidhi Sokokadidhi (transl. One toils, another enjoys) is a 1979 Indian Telugu-language action comedy film directed by Singeetam Srinivasa Rao. Kamal Haasan plays a double role as an honest doctor and a happy-go-lucky youth. He was paired with Jayasudha and Roja Ramani. Prabhakar Reddy, Sarathi, Pandari Bai, Kanta Rao, Ramaprabha and C. S. Rao play supporting roles. This was Singeetam Srinivasa Rao and Kamal Haasan's first film together.

It was dubbed into Tamil language as Iru Nilavugal (transl. Two moons), and Malayalam as Jeevikkaan Padikkanam. The film was remade into Hindi as Hum Dono in 1985 and in Kannada as Gadibidi Krishna nearly two decades later.

== Plot ==
Sommokadidhi Sokokadidhi is the story of a well respected doctor and his lookalike, who realises that his face is similar to that of the doctor. So he plots a plan to take the doctor's place when he is away from the hospital. He soon starts to pretend that he is the doctor.

One day the doctor discovers he has a lookalike. He pretends that he is Shekhar. Shekhar goes to rest Ranga's house but fall in love with Ranga's cousin sister at the first sight. Ranga falls in love with Shekhar's fiancée. The climax reveals that Ranga and Shekhar are identical twins. Some goons kidnapped Shekhar for money. Both brothers are reunited and marry their lovers.

== Cast ==
- Kamal Haasan in dual role as
  - Ranga
  - Shekhar
- Jayasudha as Lily
- Rojaramani as Chellam
- Prabhakar Reddy
- Sarathi
- Pandari Bai as Parvathi
- Kanta Rao
- Raavi Kondala Rao
- Ramaprabha
- C. S. Rao

== Production ==
Sommokadidi Sokokadidi was the first film where Singeetam Srinivasa Rao and Kamal Haasan worked together. It was also Haasan's first dual role in Telugu cinema. The dialogues were written by Jandhyala.

== Soundtrack ==
The soundtrack is composed by Rajan–Nagendra, with lyrics by Veturi.

Telugu track listing
No.	Title	Singer(s)	Length
1.	"Tholivalapu Tondaralu"	S. P. Balasubrahmanyam, S. Janaki	4:03
2.	"Aakasam Nee Haddura"	S. P. Balasubrahmanyam	4:27
3.	"Aa Ponna Needalo"	S. P. Balasubrahmanyam, P. Susheela	4:26
4.	"Oh Baala Raja"	P. Susheela	4:03
5.	"Abbo Neredu Pallu"	S. P. Balasubrahmanyam, S. Janaki	4:48

Malayalam track listing (Jeevikkaan Padikkanam)
No.	Title	Lyrics	Singer(s)	Length
1.	"Aa Poovanathilum"	Sreekumaran Thampi	P. Jayachandran, Vani Jairam
2.	"Aakaasham Nin Swantham"	Sreekumaran Thampi	S. P. Balasubrahmanyam
3.	"Ambeyyaan"	Sreekumaran Thampi	P. Jayachandran, S. P. Sailaja
4.	"Oh Praananaadha"	Sreekumaran Thampi	S. P. Sailaja
5.	"Oru Vasantham"	Sreekumaran Thampi	K. J. Yesudas, S. Janaki

Tamil Track listing (Iru Nilavugal)
No.	Title	Lyrics	Singer(s)	Length
1.	"Thoda Varavo Thontharavo"	Vaali	S. P. Balasubrahmanyam, S. Janaki
2.	"Anandam Adhu Ennada"	Vaali	S. P. Balasubrahmanyam
3.	"Anbulla Kannano"	Vaali	S. P. Balasubrahmanyam, P. Susheela
4.	"Ammadi Kannaippaaru"	Vaali	S. P. Balasubrahmanyam, S. Janaki

== Reception ==
Reviewing the Tamil dubbed version Iru Nilavugal for Kalki, Kousigan praised the performance of Kamal Haasan, the music, dialogues and cinematography.
