= Neeti Nijayiti =

Neeti-Nijayiti
- Poster
- Directed by: Singeetam Srinivasa Rao
- Written by: Singeetam Srinivasa Rao
- Dialogues by: Pingali Nagendra Rao
- Produced by: M. Lakshmikanta Reddy; H. V. Sanjeeva Reddy
- Starring: Krishnam Raju; Kanchana
- Cinematography: Kamal Ghosh
- Edited by: Vasu
- Music by: S. Rajeswara Rao
- Release date: 11 August 1972
- Country: India
- Language: Telugu

Neeti-Nijayiti (transl. Morality-Honesty) is a 1972 Indian Telugu-language comedy film written and directed by Singeetam Srinivasa Rao and produced by M. Lakshmikanta Reddy and H. V. Sanjeeva Reddy. The film stars Krishnam Raju and Kanchana. The dialogues were written by Pingali Nagendra Rao. The music was composed by S. Rajeswara Rao. The lyrics were penned by C. Narayana Reddy. It is the debut film of Singeetam Srinivasa Rao.

== Cast ==
- Krishnam Raju as Ramesh
- Kanchana as Lakshmi
- Satish Arora as Anand
- Gummadi as Bhujanga Rao
- Nagabhushanam as G.G. Bose
- Raavi Kondala Rao as Punyakoti
- Nagayya as Venkanna
- Rajanala as Indra in skit
- Ram Mohan as Chandra in skit

== Soundtrack ==
- "Bhale Mazaale"
- "Babullaaga Bratakalante"
- "Dubu Dubu Dub"
- "Maatalakandani Bhavalu"
- "Nee Madilo Daagina Paata"
