= Emani Sankara Sastry =

- Born: 23 September 1922; Draksharama, Andhra Pradesh, India
- Died: 1987 (aged 65)
- Genre: Carnatic music
- Occupation: Veena player
- Instrument: Veena
- Daughter: Emani Kalyani Lakshminarayana

Emani Sankara Sastry (23 September 1922 – 1987) was an Indian veena player of Carnatic music.

== Early life ==
Sastry was born on 23 September 1922 in Draksharamam, India. He came from a family of celebrated classical musicians. His father, Vainika Bhooshana Veena Acharya Emani Achyutarama Sastri, a Veena player and scholar, was a contemporary of Tumarada Sangameshwara Sastri and Veena Vekataramana Das of Andhra.

His father began his training at a young age.

He attended Andhra University. He played duets with Ustad Abdul Halim Jaffer Khan, Pandit Ravi Shankar, and Pandit Gopal Krishan (on vichitra veena).

== Career ==
Sastry gave concerts across India. His participation in East-West music festivals, Tansen festival, Vishnu Digambar festival, and other prestigious music conferences won him distinction in the field of music.

He joined Gemini Studios at Madras, where he was the music director for more than ten years. He composed tunes based on novel techniques and directed music for films such as Mangla, Sansar, Bahut Din Huwe, Vindhyarani, Nishan, Mr. Sampat and English version of Chandralekha. His compositions of keerthanas, javalis and bhajans can be frequently heard in his solo concerts. He wrote operas in Hindi and regional languages.

Sastry joined All India Radio in 1959 as producer of music at Madras. He rose to the position of director and composer of the national orchestra and chief producer of music. He presented plok classical, thematic orchestral compositions, and folk melodies, exposing the special tonal qualities of Indian instruments and synthesised musical patterns with a distinctive touch.

He was associated with cultural and academic organisations. He was the asthaan vidwan (court musician) of Tirumala Tirupati Devasthanams, member of the university grants committee to advise on music and member of the expert committee at Madras Music Academy.

He was designated founding chairman of the committee to select candidates for scholarships of the education ministry for Carnatic music. He was a member to select film awards (national) and a member of the central Sangeet Natak Akademi to select candidates for the national awards.

Sastry introduced young singers to the musical world. Prominent among them was playback singer P.B. Srinivos, who later became a singer in Tamil, Kannada, and Telugu films.

== Recognition ==
- Maha Mahopadhyaya (the first South Indian to receive it).
- Sangeet Natak Akademi Award (1973)
- Sahitya Kala Parishad award
- Padma Shri
- Doctorate of Andhra University
- Chaturdandi panditaha by All India felicitation committee
- Asian Rostrum Award (1973)
- Veena Virtuoso (1953)

To quote: Vainika Sikhamani, Vainika Siromani, Veena Gana Gandhrava, Ganarupa Kalasaraswathi, Veena Vadanatatvegna, Gandhrava Kalanidhi, Gana Kala Dhara, Veena Chakravarthi, Vallaki Vallabha.

He was invited to participate in the Pan Asiatic Music and Dance Festival at Rome during July 1980.

== Orchestrations ==
His major orchestrations include:

- Adarsa sikhararohanam – based on the theme of the conquest of Mount Everest, in which he used six veenas.
- Swara tarangini – employing sounds that gradually crystallise into musical swaras suggesting the origin of sound and music.
- Ragam Thanam Pallavi – based on the classical raga Todi.
- Indu – based on the first six ragas of the first chakra of the melakarta scheme of the great Venkatamakhin
- Bharata jyoti – based on Pandit Nehru
- Saumya pursh – based on Mahatma Gandhiji's ideals
- Brmara vinyas – depicted a day in the life of a bee

== Personal life ==
He trained his daughter Emani Kalyani in veena. She performed solo concerts on the radio and in public concerts. His second daughter is ghazal singer Devi Murthy.

== Legacy ==
His disciple Chitti Babu became a veena player. Other disciples include: V. Saraswathi, M. Y. Kama Sastry, S. N. Satyamurthy, S.N. Ramachandran and Vishwanathan. Palagummi Viswanadham, renowned composer of light music, is his first disciple.
