= Gummadi =

Gummadi (Telugu: గుమ్మడి) is a Telugu surname. It may refer to:

- Gummadi (actor) (1927–2010), Telugu film actor
- Gummadi Vittal Rao (born 1949), revolutionary Telugu balladeer and vocal Naxalite
- Jaya Krishna Gummadi (born 1974), Indian cinematographer
