= Devathalara Deevinchandi =

- Directed by: Kommineni Seshagiri Rao
- Written by: Kommineni Seshagiri Rao (story and screenplay), Jandhyala (dialogues)
- Starring: Chandra Mohan; Giri Babu; Jayamalini; Murali Mohan; Allu Ramalingaiah
- Cinematography: P. Deva Raj
- Music by: K. Chakravarthy
- Release date: 1977
- Country: India
- Language: Telugu

Devathalara Deevinchandi is a Telugu-language film directed by Kommineni Seshagiri Rao. His debut film was hit and resulted in many successful films later.

It is remake of Nagin, a highly successful 1976 Hindi film, which in turn was inspired by François Truffaut's film The Bride Wore Black, based on Cornell Woolrich's novel of the same name.

== The plot ==
The story revolves around five close friends: Mohan (Ranganath), Kubera Rao (Haribabu), Muralikrishna (Chandramohan), Giri (Eswara Rao) and Ravindra (Madala Rangarao). Kubera Rao knows about a hidden treasure in the Nallamala Forest. The friends go to the forest to find the treasure in a Naga Temple. They hurt a Nagadevatha during a ritual. Kubera Rao soon dies of a snake bite. Nagadevatha, who takes a human form as Phani (Jayamalini), takes revenge on the five friends.

== Cast ==
Actor	Character
Ranganath	Mohan
Narsimhachary	Muralikrishna
Giribabu	Upendra
Jayamalini	Phani
Eswara Rao	Giri
Madala Ranga Rao	Ravindra
Haribabu	Kubera Rao
Murali Mohan	Police Inspector
Baby Padma	
Prabha	Savitri
Mada Venkateswara Rao	Driver
Allu Ramalingaiah	
Ramaprabha	
Sakshi Ranga Rao	
Baby Varalakshmi	Nagalakshmi
Vijayalakshmi	

== Soundtrack ==
- "Amma Oka Bomma Naanna Oka Bomma - Meekenduku Ee Roju Kopamocchindi" (Singer: Baby Geeta; Cast: Baby Varalakshmi)
- "Konaloki Vastaavaa Kotta Chotu Choopistaanu" (Singer: P. Susheela; Cast: Jayamalini)
- "Nagulachavitiki Nagendraswaami Puttanindaa Paalu Posemu Tandri" (Singer: P. Susheela; Cast: Prabha)
- "O Cheli Manohari Nee Kosame Nenunnadi" (Singers: S. P. Balasubrahmanyam, P. Susheela; Cast: Chandramohan, Jayamalini)
- "Srisaila Malleeswaraa - O Kaalahastiswaraa" (Devatalara, Deevinchandi) (Singer: P. Susheela; Cast: Prabha)
