= Dikkatra Parvathi =

- Poster
- Directed by: Singeetam Srinivasa Rao
- Screenplay by: Singeetam Srinivasa Rao
- Story by: Karaikudi Narayanan; C. Rajagopalachari
- Produced by: M. Lakshmikantha Reddy; H. M. Sanjeeva Reddy
- Starring: Lakshmi; Srikanth
- Cinematography: Mankada Ravi Varma
- Edited by: Vasu
- Music by: Chitti Babu
- Production company: Navatarang
- Release date: 14 June 1974
- Country: India
- Language: Tamil

Dikkatra Parvathi (transl. Helpless Parvathi) is a 1974 Indian Tamil language drama film directed by Singeetam Srinivasa Rao based on the novel of the same name by C. Rajagopalachari.The film was entirely shot in Thorapalli, Hosur, Rajaji's birthplace. The film stars Lakshmi and Srikanth. It won the National Film Award for Best Feature Film in Tamil, while Lakshmi won many accolades for her performance and was reported to have narrowly missed the National Film Award for Best Actress.

== Plot ==
Parvathi is a happy girl who recently married a loving husband, Karuppan. With kind parents-in-law and a doting husband, her life is blissful. Soon, she has a child. Karuppan wants to increase his earnings and decides to buy a cart, though Parvathi is unwilling, asserting it is happier to be content with what they have. However Karuppan takes a loan from a money lender Kadher Khan and buys a cart. Initially, everything looks rosy. But Karuppan happens to cross the toddy shops on his way home. Slowly, he is initiated into the habit of drink and soon becomes an addict. Parvathi's life changes into one of hardship and woe. The neglect of Karuppan results in the death of the child. Parvathi's life becomes tragic. Karuppan is unable to repay the loan. Khan's son Ismail takes advantage of the increasingly abominable attitude of her husband. Parvathi helplessly gives in to the approaches of Ismail. Upon discovering this, Karuppan throws a scythe at Ismail, nearly killing him. Karuppan is arrested. Parvathi is rejected by her kith and kin. Alone she struggles to get her husband released. On the advice of a lawyer, she makes a statement in the court that she is guilty, thinking it will facilitate the release of her husband. Karuppan is sentenced to six years in prison, and rejects her. Dismayed, Parvathi climbs up a hill and kills herself.

== Cast ==
- Lakshmi as Parvathi
- Srikanth as Karuppan
- Y. G. Mahendran as Ismail
- Poornam Viswanathan
- Typist Gopu

== Production ==
The film was shot in Thorapalli, the birthplace of Rajaji, in a single 28-day schedule. The filming began on 1 October 1973 and held till 17 October, the filming was again resumed on 25 October and completed on 30 October. None of the actors wore makeup for their characters. The court scenes were shot in the actual court at Hosur and Chennai and the local lawyers participated, for the first time in Tamil cinema. Venkatasawamy Naidu, MLA from Hosur performed the role of judge. The film's ₹2.5 lakh (worth ₹3.3 crore in 2021 prices) budget was 80 per cent funded by the Film Finance Corporation of India which was subsequently renamed National Film Development Corporation of India and set a precedent. When the producers and the director could not repay the loan, then Chief Minister of Tamil Nadu, M. G. Ramachandran, repaid the dues and purchased the film for the Tamil Nadu state. It was the first time in film history that a State Government had purchased a film after its release. The dialogues for the film were written by Karaikudi Narayanan.

It was the only film with a story based upon Rajaji's work. The signature of Rajaji in the letter of permission given to Singeetam Srinivasa Rao is the last signature of his life.

== Awards ==
- National Film Award for Best Feature Film in Tamil in 1975
- Filmfare Award for Best Actress – Tamil for Lakshmi in 1975
- Filmfare Award for Best Film – Tamil in 1975

== Music ==
Chitti Babu composed two songs for the film, the lyrics of which were written by Rajaji and Kannadasan; both were sung by Vani Jairam.

1. "Aagaayam Mazhai Pozhindaal" – Vani Jairam
2. "Enna Kutram Seidheno" – Vani Jairam

== Reception ==
Kanthan of Kalki praised the film for retaining the soul of original material while also praising the performances of cast, dialogues, music and cinematography.
