= Bhagyada Lakshmi Baramma =

1986 Kannada film by Singeetam Srinivasa Rao

- Directed by: Singeetham Srinivasa Rao
- Screenplay by: Singeetham Srinivasa Rao; Chi. Udayashankar
- Story by: Singeetham Srinivasa Rao
- Produced by: Parvathamma Rajkumar
- Starring: Rajkumar; Madhavi; K. S. Ashwath
- Cinematography: V. K. Kannan
- Edited by: P. J. Mohan
- Music by: Singeetham Srinivasa Rao
- Production company: Dakshayini Combines
- Release date: 17 January 1986
- Running time: 156 minutes
- Country: India
- Language: Kannada

Bhagyada Lakshmi Baramma ( transl. Come, goddess of luck) is a 1986 Indian Kannada-language comedy film. The title of the film was borrowed from a devaranama written by 12th century Haridasa Purandara Dasa. This film was written and directed Singeetham Srinivasa Rao who also composed and scored the film's soundtrack. The film stars Rajkumar, Madhavi and K. S. Ashwath in the pivotal roles.

The film, produced by Parvathamma Rajkumar under Dakshayini Combines, was received exceptionally well at the box office and was one of the biggest hits of 1986. The movie saw a theatrical run of 26 weeks. The dialogues and lyrics were penned by Chi. Udaya Shankar. The movie was reported to have an overwhelming response from the Kannada circuit. This was also one of the first Kannada movies to be released in Hyderabad. The movie was remade in Telugu in 1988 as Maharajasri Mayagadu starring Krishna and Sridevi with changes suiting the nativity.

== Plot ==
Panduranga and Parvathi hail from middle-class families with the sole intention of earning money, Panduranga wants money to make his sisters lead a happy life and also wants to escape from his uncle Tarle Tammayya who forces him to marry his daughter. After failed attempts, Panduranga and Parvathi decide to pose as married couple for a competition conducted by Ananda Enterprises and also bring a missing baby along with them. All the couples are under the eye of the competition judges. Panduranga and Parvati pretend to be couple to fool them and also to avoid Tammayya's trouble. Panduranga makes Tammayya seem to be mentally ill. When Parvati's grandfather, whom Parvati hates because of his arrogance, discovers this he decides to choose them as a couple, however his other granddaughter is not interested and later relents after learning that Panduranga once saved her life. After a funny chase towards the end, Panduranga and Parvathi are selected as best couple.

== Cast ==
- Dr. Rajkumar as Panduranga
- Madhavi as Parvathi
- K. S. Ashwath as Parvathi's grandfather
- Balakrishna as Tarle Tammayya, Panduranga's uncle
- Parvathavani as Manager, Ananda Hotel
- Thoogudeepa Srinivas
- Uma Shivakumar as Champaka Malini
- Papamma as Panduranga's mother
- Shanthamma as Panduranga's grandmother
- Vijay Kashi
- Shivaram as a judge
- Venkobrao as a judge
- Honnavalli Krishna as postman
- Mysore Lokesh

== Soundtrack ==
The music was composed by Singeetham Srinivasa Rao who debuted as a music director with this movie. Singeetham requested Ilaiyaraaja to conduct the orchestra. The lyrics were by Chi. Udaya Shankar.

Track listing
No.	Title	Singer(s)	Length
1.	"Innu Hattira Hattira"	P. Susheela, Dr. Rajkumar
2.	"Yenu Mayavo Yenu Marmavo"	Dr. Rajkumar, Vani Jairam
3.	"Nee Atthare Entha Chenna"	Dr. Rajkumar, B. R. Chaya
4.	"Bhagyada Lakshmi Baramma"	S. P. Balasubrahmanyam
5.	"Yaava Kaviyu Bareyalara"	Dr. Rajkumar
6.	"Ananda Ananda"	Dr. Rajkumar, Vani Jairam, Chi. Dattaraj

== Awards ==
1985–86 Karnataka State Film Awards

- Best Screenplay — Singeetham Srinivasa Rao and Chi. Udaya Shankar

34th Filmfare Awards South

- Best Film – Kannada
- Best Actor – Kannada — Rajkumar

11th International Film Festival of India
screened in the mainstream section
