= Devayani (dancer) =

Indian classical dancer

Kumari Devayani
- Born: Paris, France
- Other name: Kumari Devayānī
- Occupations: Bharatanatyam dancer and choreographer
- Spouse: Late M. M Kohli
- Website: www.devayanidance.com

Annick Chaymotty, known by the stage name Kumari Devayani, is an Indian dancer who performs in the classical Indian dance style Bharatanatyam. She has performed in India as well as in festivals and concert halls in the UK, France, Germany, Spain, Italy, Greece, Portugal, the Scandinavian countries, Estonia, and South Korea. Devayānī is an empanelled artist with the Indian Council for Cultural Relations. In 2009, she was awarded the Padma Shri.

== Early life ==
Chaymotty became interested in dance as an art form as a young girl, when she saw pictures by the French impressionist painter Edgar Degas in a book. A few years later, at the age of 10, she started attending classical music and dance classes in a Paris conservatory. She studied classical ballet and modern contemporary dance at the Schola Cantorum de Paris. She was noticed by the flamenco dancer Lutys de Luz, a soloist of the Ballet Company of the Marquis de Cuevas, who taught her the Spanish classical dance at Salle Pleyel.

Chaymotty's first encounter with Indian classical music was at a performance by Ravi Shankar. She started taking Bharatanatyam classes, and was awarded an Indo-French Cultural Exchange Programme ICCR scholarship in 1973 to learn Bharatanatyam in India.

=== 1973–1978 ===
In Chennai, Chaymotty learned Bharatanatyam from teachers including Kancheepuram Ellapa Mudaliar, Kalaimamani V.S. Muthuswamy Pillai. Kumari Sawrnamukhi trained her in karanas (sculptural poses), Padma Bushan Kalanidhi Narayanan in abhinaya, and Padma Vibushan Dr. Balamuralikrishna in vocal Carnatic music. At this time she adopted the stage name Devayani.

Devayani was cast in the lead role of the Telugu film America Ammayi directed by Singeetam Srinivasa Rao, which became popular in India and abroad.

== Career ==
=== 1978–1981 ===
Devayani left Chennai in June 1978 and returned to Paris, where she performed at the Centre Mandapa and at the Pernod Club on the Champs-Élysées. She had a TV programme for FR3, DOM-TOM, and she taught Bharatanatyam and yoga to students at the Sorbonne University.

=== 1982–1986 ===
In January 1982, the Indian Council for Cultural Relations made Devayani their official representative on a tour for the celebrations of India's Republic Day in the West German cities Bonn, Frankfurt, and Essen.

Through the 1980s, she toured India and Europe and gave performances at festivals and in concert halls. In 1983 she won a special award for her choreography of Indian dance at the international choreography contest in Nyon, Switzerland, and was on the cover of Ballet News.

=== 1987–1999 ===
In 1987, Devayani gave several performances in New Delhi, toured India at the invitation of the South-Central Zone Cultural Centre, Nagpur, and performed in Hyderabad as a state guest of Andhra Pradesh. She also performed at the Edinburgh Fringe Festival, and returned to the festival as a performer for ten years, until a bad review in 1997 made her decide to stop performing there.

Devayani has a powerful command of the music ... a sensuous and captivating stage presence. Devayani's Temple is an enthralling if complex production by an accomplished artist.

— Hazel Wright, The Scotsman September 1, 1989

In the late 1980s, she toured Scandinavia, Germany, and India. In 1990, she performed at the residence of the Danish Ambassador in New Delhi, on the occasion of the Queen of Denmark's birthday.

In 1990, the Arts Council of Great Britain invited her to become artist-in-residence for six months in Newcastle-upon-Tyne, to promote Indian dance and culture.

During the 1990s, she toured Europe, performing at various events. In 1998, she was invited to perform at the Opera House of Tallinn, Estonia and at the Embassy of India in Athens.

=== 2000–2007 ===
In May 2000, she was one of the main performers at the XXIV Algarve International Music Festival in Portugal, together with opera singers Luciano Pavarotti and Olga Borodina. In September 2004, Devayani was the official Indian representative at the World Culture Open 2004 in Seoul, Korea. Devayani was selected by the International Dance Council (National Commission for UNESCO, Paris) to perform in 2006 in Athens, Greece, at The Peace & Friendship Stadium for the 20th World Congress on Dance Research and in 2007 at the Dora Sratou Amphitheatre for the 21st World Congress on Dance, next to the Acropolis.

In 2004 she received the IMM Top Cultural Ambassador Award for Excellence.

=== 2008–present ===
In 2008, Devayani was selected by the Ministry of Tourism of India, for its international advertising campaign "Real People". In November 2008, Devayani received the 'National Women Excellence Award' for her contributions to culture, tradition and art promotion, by the Women International Network at India International Centre in New Delhi. On 14 April 2009, Devayani was conferred the Padma Shri Award by the President of India for her distinguished services and outstanding achievements. Devayani is the first French artist to have received this award. Devayani also received the 'International Yog Confederation of India' Award 2009, for her contributions to the field of Culture.

== Seminars and workshops ==
Devayani has participated in number of seminars and conducted workshops, master classes, and lecture demonstrations of Bharatanatyam.

- The International Dance Workshop, Bonn, Germany 1981
- The East West Dance Encounter, Mumbai, India 1984
- Workshop with Ballet Rambert, Newcastle upon Tyne, Northern Arts, a UK National Dance Agency 1990
- The Commonwealth Institute, London, U.K.1990
- The American College of Greece, Athens, Greece 2002
- Dhiskha Children's Summer Festival, The Akshara Theatre, New Delhi, India 2005
- British School, British High Commission, New Delhi 2009
- SPIC MACAY Programs 2011 -2013

== Personal life ==
Devayani's long time partner and husband was Late M. M. Kohli, former Indian Administrative Service secretary of India, who died in 2015.

== Awards, honours and recognition ==
Year	Awards
1973–1975 & 1976–1978	Indo-French Cultural Exchange Programme Scholarship, Madras
1980–1984	Awarded the I.C.C.R. Scholarship, New Delhi.
1982	Awarded a special grant from the French Embassy, New Delhi.
1983	Award at International Choreography Contest, Nyon, Switzerland.
1987	"Award for exemplary contribution to the Art and Tradition of Bharata Natyam", South Central Zonal Cultural Centre (S.C.Z.C.C.), India.
1988	"Award for Exemplary contribution to the Art and Tradition of Bharata Natyam", North Central Zonal Cultural Centre (N.C.Z.C.C.), India.
1991	Assisted by the Deptt. of Culture, Ministry of Human Resource and Development, New Delhi for the production 'Devadasi'.
1998	"Award for Achievement of Excellence" conferred on Devayani by the Andhra Cultural & Welfare Society, New Delhi.
2001	Classified as Eminent Artist, by the Ministry of Culture, Government of India, New Delhi.
2004	The "Top Cultural Ambassador Award for Excellence" was awarded to Devayani by the Institute of Marketing & Management in New Delhi. This honour was conferred on her in recognition of her outstanding contribution to the internationalisation of Bharatanatyam.
2008	The "National Women Excellence Award" for her outstanding contribution to Culture, Tradition & Art Promotion.
2008	Selected by the Ministry of Tourism of India, to be Brand Ambassador for the "Incredible India" advertising campaign titled "Real People".
2009	Conferred a Certificate of Appreciation by the Yog Confederation of India for her contribution in the field of Culture and the promotion & propagation of Traditional Systems during the International Conference on Gandhi, Yog and Global Peace
2009	Padma Shri
2013	Nominated for the" Bharat Jyoti Award" by the India International Friendship Society, New Delhi

=== Special distinctions ===
She was invited by the Arts Council of England as artist-in-residence, to promote Indian dance and culture in 1990, at the Newcastle upon Tyne National Dance Agency.

Devayani performed for the United Nations' Day in New Delhi in 1981, India's Republic Day Celebrations in Germany in 1981, Pandit Jawaharlal Nehru's Birth Centenary in France, Denmark, and Germany in 1989, a function held to celebrate the Birthday of the Queen of Denmark in New Delhi in 1990, and the 50th Anniversary of India's Independence in Greece in 1998.

Devayani was an active member of the International Dance Council (CID), UNESCO from 2003 to 2007.

== In the media ==
Devayani was given a full page coverage in Time and Newsweek in addition to 70 other international magazines for the "Real People" campaign of the Ministry of Tourism of India.

Films of Devayani's performances have been broadcast by the BBC, Tyne Tees Television, ITV (U.K.), Zee T.V., Asianet T.V. (U.K., Europe, U.S.), FR3 (France), Net (Greece), and Indian T.V. Network.
