= Michael Madana Kama Rajan =

1990 film by Singeetam Srinivasa Rao

- Theatrical release poster
- Directed by: Singeetham Srinivasa Rao
- Screenplay by: Kamal Haasan; Crazy Mohan (dialogue)
- Story by: Kader Kashmiri
- Produced by: Meena Panchu Arunachalam
- Starring: Kamal Haasan; Urvasi; Rupini; Khushbu
- Cinematography: B. C. Gowrishankar; Kabir Lal
- Edited by: D. Vasu
- Music by: Ilaiyaraaja
- Production company: P. A. Art Productions
- Release date: 17 October 1990
- Running time: 162 minutes
- Country: India
- Language: Tamil

Michael Madana Kama Rajan (Note: Alternatively spelt as Michael, Madana, Kama, Rajan.) is a 1990 Indian Tamil-language comedy film directed by Singeetham Srinivasa Rao and written by Kamal Haasan, with Crazy Mohan penning the dialogues. The film stars Haasan in four roles alongside Urvasi, Rupini and Khushbu while Manorama, Delhi Ganesh, Nassar, Vennira Aadai Moorthy, S. N. Lakshmi, Jayabharathi, R. N. Jayagopal, Nagesh, Praveen Kumar, Santhana Bharathi and R. S. Shivaji play supporting roles. It revolves around quadruplets who get separated at birth and cross paths as adults.

Panchu Arunachalam obtained the rights to adapt a Pakistani film written by Kader Kashmiri. Despite retaining that film's core premise of quadruplets, Rao, Haasan and Mohan created an otherwise entirely new story. The film was produced by Arunachalam's wife Meena, photographed by B. C. Gowrishankar and Kabir Lal, and edited by D. Vasu.

Michael Madana Kama Rajan was released on 17 October 1990, Diwali day. The film was commercially successful, running for 175 days, thereby becoming a silver jubilee film.

== Plot ==
An industrialist named Venugopal marries a woman, Sushila, and she gives birth to quadruplets. Seeking the family inheritance, Venugopal's treacherous brother, Nandagopal, hires a gang of goons to slaughter the mother and her infants. However, the gang leader, Alex, experiences a sudden change of heart. Refusing to execute them, he splits the brothers up to ensure their safety: he adopts one (Michael), leaves one at an orphanage (Subramaniam Raju), places one at a temple (Kameshwaran)—who is adopted by a Palakkad Brahmin cook named Mani Iyer—and leaves the final infant (Madanagopal) inside Venugopal's car.

Three decades later, Madan has grown into a London-educated businessman. Venugopal has raised him as an adopted heir, completely unaware of their biological relationship. Believing they have secured the fortune, Nandagopal and his son, Ramu, orchestrate an assassination attempt on Venugopal; unknown to them, Venugopal's legally binding will already names Madan as the sole beneficiary. Madan returns to Bangalore to assume control of the enterprise, immediately confronting his father's personal assistant, Avinashi, over a massive corporate embezzlement scheme.

In Madras, Michael and Alex operate a counterfeit currency racket. During a frantic police evasion, Michael inadvertently triggers a fire inside an art gallery. Raju, now a firefighter, rescues an artist named Shalini and her paintings, sparking a romance between them. Concurrently, Kameshwaran, who works as a traditional vegetarian wedding cook, meets Thirupurasundari "Thirupu" and her grandmother at an event, eventually marrying Thirupu.

Madan receives an anonymous tip revealing that his father's death was a calculated murder plot, instructing him to travel to Madras. Following a series of chaotic delays involving a theatre artist, Chakkubai, and her mother, Gangubai, Madan meets the informant, Sushila, unaware she is his biological mother. While fleeing hitmen dispatched by Ramu, Madan crosses paths with his physical lookalike, Raju. Madan hires Raju to impersonate him in Bangalore to keep the corporate empire secure while he investigates the conspiracy in Madras, offering to clear Raju's debts in exchange.

Meanwhile, Nandagopal and Ramu hire Michael to assassinate Madan. Michael sabotages Madan's vehicle, unaware that Raju is behind the wheel. Although the brakes fail on a highway, Raju successfully navigates the vehicle to a safe halt. Sushila meets Raju, mistaking him for Madan, but he redirects her to the real Madan in Madras. Raju, accompanied by Shalini and her father, arrives at the Bangalore estate and aggressively confiscates Avinashi's embezzled funds, completely unaware of Madan's prior leniency deal with the assistant.

Concurrently, Michael locates the real Madan in Madras, who has fallen in love with Chakkubai. Michael and Alex trail Madan's group to Sushila's safehouse, where it is revealed that Venugopal survived the original assassination attempt. Upon entering, Sushila recognizes Alex as the man who took her infants, realizing that Michael and Madan are her biological sons. Michael and Alex swiftly neutralize the group, abducting Madan and his parents to a remote mountain cabin near Bangalore.

Desperate to recover the confiscated money, Avinashi happens upon Kameshwaran and hires him to masquerade as Madan. Back at the mansion, Avinashi drugs Raju's soup, but Madan's bodyguard Bheem consumes it instead. Michael infiltrates the house to plunder the estate, spots Raju, and mistakes him for an escaped Madan. Michael knocks Raju unconscious and flees. Discovering the slumped Raju and assuming it is the result of his spiked soup, Avinashi hurriedly smuggles Kameshwaran into the household.

An intricate comedy of errors ensues as Shalini mistakes Kameshwaran for Raju, attempting to get intimate with him, only for an outraged Thirupu to drag her husband away. Witnessing Kameshwaran embracing Thirupu, a furious Shalini believes Raju has betrayed her. Chakkubai and Gangubai arrive searching for Madan; Chakkubai mistakes Kameshwaran for her lover and introduces herself as his fiancée. Driven to a frenzy, Shalini seizes a rifle and holds the entire household at gunpoint, refusing to believe their frantic explanations that Kameshwaran is an impostor.

The real Madan escapes the mountain cabin with his parents and arrives amid the domestic standoff. Capitalizing on the utter chaos, Michael steals Madan's asset bonds and retreats to the mountain cabin. The entire household pursues him in a multi-car chase. At the cabin, Ramu and Nandagopal ambush the arriving group at gunpoint. With all four identical brothers consolidated in the same room, Sushila tearfully reveals their true brotherhood. The immense weight of the gathered crowd causes the precariously balanced cliffside cabin to tilt over the precipice. Overcoming the goons, the four unified brothers combine their strength to safely evacuate everyone before the structure plummets, successfully validating their family bond.

== Cast ==
- Kamal Haasan as:
  - Michael
  - Madanagopal
  - Kameshwaran
  - Subramaniam Raju
- Urvashi as Thiripurasundari
- Rupini as Chakkubai
- Khushbu as Shalini Sivaraman
- Nagesh as Avinashi
- Vennira Aadai Moorthy as Sivaraman
- Nassar as Ram Gopal aka Ramu
- Manorama as Gangubai
- Jayabharathi as Sushila
- S. N. Lakshmi as Krishnaveni
- Praveen Kumar as Bheem
- Delhi Ganesh as Palakkad Mani Iyer
- Santhana Bharathi as Alex
- R. S. Shivaji as David
- R. N. K. Prasad as Venugopal
- R. N. Jayagopal as Nandagopal
- Crazy Mohan as the provisions store owner
- Ananthu (guest appearance)
- Ponnambalam as an assassin
- Venkatesh as an assassin
- Gopinath Rao as Varadhu Kutty
- Mayilsamy as Raju's colleague
- Singeetham Srinivasa Rao as the travelling singer (uncredited)
- Mandeep Roy as one of the office colleagues (uncredited)

== Production ==
=== Development ===
According to executive producer Subbu Panchu, the producer Panchu Arunachalam saw a Pakistani film featuring quadruplets being separated at birth and reuniting in the climax. He obtained the rights to adapt that film in Tamil, with Singeetham Srinivasa Rao hired to direct, the screenplay written by Kamal Haasan and the dialogues by Crazy Mohan. While the film retained the original's core premise, the team of Rao, Haasan and Mohan created an otherwise entirely new story with inputs from Arunachalam. The film was initially titled Jolly Jag Jeevan Ram, but no one liked it. Mohan suggested Madana Kama Rajan, which Haasan agreed to but felt it was not inclusive; at his suggestion, Mohan added "Michael". As Haasan did not want to spend time to establish the premise, the opening montage song "Kadha Kelu Kadha Kelu" was conceived to serve as exposition.

Haasan said he wrote the script of Michael Madana Kama Rajan "like a kolam that you teach a child. There were just a few dots and crosses. Mohan was the only one who truly got it." He said the story has its origin in Oscar Wilde's play The Importance of Being Earnest. Despite being credited for the story, Kader Kashmiri had not received his due of ₹11 lakh (equivalent to ₹1.2 crore or US$130,000 in 2026) as of 2013. The film was produced by Arunachalam's wife Meena under P. A. Art Productions, editing by D. Vasu, and cinematography by B. C. Gowrishankar and Kabir Lal.

=== Casting ===
Haasan played four distinct characters who are quadruplets: the criminal Michael, the businessman Madanagopal, the cook Kameshwaran and the firefighter Subramaniam Raju. To portray each quadruplet, Haasan sported different looks; for Michael, he grew his hair long and had a French beard; for Madan, he wore glasses and was clean-shaven; for Kameshwaran (also clean-shaven), he brushed his hair back and applied a vibhuti tilaka on his forehead; for Raju, he kept his moustache thick and hair short. He even had different speaking styles for each quadruplet, reflecting their diverse upbringings: a "gruff" accent for Michael, an English one for Madan, a Palakkad one for Kameshwaran, and Madras Bashai for Raju. As Coimbatore was then a hub for numerous counterfeit money scams, Haasan added this to Michael's characterisation.

Urvashi played Kameshwaran's love interest Thirupurasundari. She dubbed in her own voice at Haasan's insistence. Khushbu was cast as Raju's love interest Shalini after a meeting with Subbu Panchu. Rupini played Madan's love interest Chakku Bai. According to Haasan, all three actresses would be "squeamish about what would be their part and we couldn't take any more of it", hence a love interest for Michael was not created.

Nagesh initially wanted to play a different role from Madan's PA Avinashi, but when Haasan asked him if he would play his role, Nagesh retorted, "As if you'd give me that if I asked you for it!" He was interested in playing Thirupurasundari's kleptomaniac grandmother before S. N. Lakshmi was cast. Vennira Aadai Moorthy, who played Shalini's father Shivaraman, added "his own quirks" to the role. Haasan cast Praveen Kumar as Madan's bodyguard after being impressed with his performance as Bhima in the TV series Mahabharat; the bodyguard was named Bheem as a reference to the earlier role. Delhi Ganesh, who played Kameshwaran's foster father Mani Iyer, also used a Palakkad accent for his character. Santhana Bharathi was cast as Michael's foster father Alex after Haasan recommended him to Rao.

=== Filming ===
Michael Madana Kamarajan was shot mainly in Bangalore to accommodate Gowrishankar's availability. The confrontation scene of Kameshwaran and Thirupurasundari was shot in Alwarpet in a single shot. The song "Sundhari Neeyum Sundharan Njanum" was filmed entirely in slow-motion at 48 frames per second. Rao initially wanted the picturisation with 20 widows in background, but changed the idea after hearing the tune of the song. The song "Rum Bum Bum Arambum" was choreographed by Prabhu Deva. In a scene set in Madan's house where many characters confront each other, they cunningly try to evade Michael when held by him at gunpoint; it was not written in the script that they should do so, but improvised during filming at Haasan's suggestion.

The climax sequence, featuring a "cliff-hanging-house", was based on a similar scene from the American film The Gold Rush (1925). The exterior portion was shot in Coonoor and the interior of the house was shot in a studio, in a hydraulic set. Due to his rapport with Panchu Arunachalam, Santhana Bharathi was allowed to aid post-production works such as dubbing and re-recording.

== Themes and influences ==
Haasan has acknowledged various films as influences on Michael Madana Kama Rajan, namely Nadodi Mannan, Deiva Magan and Yaadon Ki Baaraat. Rao described it as a "modern version of the old folk tale of a king, queen and their quadruplets who grow up in different households".

== Soundtrack ==
The soundtrack was composed by Ilaiyaraaja. Vaalee wrote the lyrics for all songs except "Kadha Kelu Kadha Kelu" and "Rum Bum Bum", which Panchu Arunachalam wrote. "Sundhari Neeyum Sundharan Njanum" was conceived out of Haasan's desire for a song like "Margazhi Thingal" (a verse from the devotional poem Tiruppavai) to feature in the film. K. J. Yesudas was supposed to sing the song, but was not available. Haasan offered to record a dummy version and have his vocals replaced, but Ilaiyaraaja insisted on him singing the official version, rather than wait for Yesudas' availability. The Malayalam lyrics in the song were written by Poovachal Khader. The song is set in the Carnatic raga known as Kedaram.

"Per Vechalum Vekkama Ponnalum" was inspired by the Thirukkural. While writing the lyrics, Vaali made every syllable have a stress as instructed by Ilaiyaraaja. "Siva Rathiri" is set in Natabhairavi, and "Mathapoovu Oru Penna" is set in Pahadi.The songs "Mathapoovu Oru Penna" and "Aadi Pattam Thedi" were not picturised. For the Telugu-dubbed version Michael Madana Kama Raju, Rajasri wrote all the lyrics. "Per Vechalum Vekkama Ponnalum" was later remixed by Ilaiyaraaja's son Yuvan Shankar Raja for Dikkiloona (2021). "Rum Bum Bum Arambum" was recreated by Yuvan for Coffee with Kadhal (2022). "Sivaratri" was recreated in the film Mrs & Mr (2025).

Tamil tracklist
No.	Title	Lyrics	Singer(s)	Length
1.	"Kadha Kelu Kadha Kelu"	Panchu Arunachalam	Ilaiyaraaja
2.	"Rum Bum Bum Arambum"	Panchu Arunachalam	S. P. Balasubrahmanyam, K. S. Chithra
3.	"Siva Rathiri"	Vaalee	K. S. Chithra, Mano
4.	"Sundhari Neeyum Sundharan Njanum"	Panchu Arunachalam, Poovachal Khader	Kamal Haasan, S. Janaki
5.	"Per Vechalum Vekkama Ponnalum"	Vaalee	Malaysia Vasudevan, S. Janaki
6.	"Mathapoovu Oru Penna"	Vaalee	K. S. Chithra
7.	"Aadi Pattam Thedi"	Vaalee	Mano, K. S. Chithra

Telugu tracklist
No.	Title	Singer(s)	Length
1.	"Katha Chebutha"	Singeetam Srinivasa Rao
2.	"Rum Bum Bum Arambham"	S. P. Balasubrahmanyam, K. S. Chithra
3.	"Siva Rathiri"	S. P. Balasubrahmanyam, K. S. Chithra
4.	"Sundharudeevu Sundari Nenu"	S. P. Balasubrahmanyam, K. S. Chithra
5.	"Ee Kerintha"	S. P. Balasubrahmanyam, K. S. Chithra

== Release and reception ==
Michael Madana Kama Rajan was released on 17 October 1990, Diwali day. Julie of Kalki lauded the comedy dialogues, felt Urvashi surpassed Khushbu and Rupini in terms of acting and liked Haasan's performance as Kameshwaran the most among the quadruplets, but criticised the climax for being unnecessarily prolonged. The film was commercially successful and ran for 175 days, thereby becoming a silver jubilee film.

== Bibliography ==
- Dhananjayan, G. (2011). The Best of Tamil Cinema, 1931 to 2010: 1977–2010. Galatta Media. OCLC 733724281.
- Sundararaman (2007) [2005]. Raga Chintamani: A Guide to Carnatic Ragas Through Tamil Film Music (2nd ed.). Pichhamal Chintamani. OCLC 295034757.
