= G. C. Sekhar =

Indian film director

G. C. Sekhar is a Telugu, Tamil and Kannada film director. In the 1970s and 1980s, he directed movies featuring prominent actors including Krishnam Raju, Suman, Mohan Babu, Krishna and others.

== Filmography ==
=== Director ===
- Jeevana Teeralu in Telugu in 1977
- Allari Bullodu in Telugu in 1978
- Athani Kante Ghanudu in Telugu in 1978
- Adrushtavanthulu in Telugu in 1980
- Aval Oru Pachchaikkuzhandhai in Tamil in 1978
- Vazhkai Alaigal in Tamil in 1978
- Adhrushtavantudu in Telugu in 1980
- Padmavyuham in Telugu in 1984
- Pattudala in Telugu in 1992

=== Chief Associate Director ===
- Bhakta Tukaram in Telugu in 1973
- Sansar in Hindi in 1987
- Sathi Sakkubai
- Amma Kosamu
- Bharya
