= Jeevana Teeralu =

- Poster
- Directed by: G. C. Sekhar
- Written by: Mukhram Sharma (story); Satyanand (dialogues)
- Produced by: A. Gopala Krishna (Adusumilli Gopalakrishna)
- Starring: Krishnam Raju; Vanisri; Jayasudha; Sivaji Ganesan; Jaggayya
- Cinematography: V. S. R. Swamy
- Edited by: Kotagiri Gopala Rao
- Music by: K. Chakravarthy
- Production company: Maruti Combines
- Distributed by: Maruti Combines
- Release date: 12 August 1977
- Country: India
- Language: Telugu

Jeevana Teeralu is a 1977 Telugu-language film directed by G. C. Sekhar and produced by A. Gopala Krishna (Adusumilli Gopalakrishna). The film stars Krishnam Raju, Vanisri, Jayasudha, Sivaji Ganesan and Jaggayya. The film had musical score by K. Chakravarthy. It is a remake of 1959 Bollywood film Dhool Ka Phool directed by Yash Chopra. The film was dubbed and released in Tamil as Vaazhkai Alaigal.

== Cast ==
- Krishnam Raju as Ramesh
- Vanisri as Meena
- Jayasudha as Ramesh's wife
- Sivaji Ganesan as Nagulu (dubbed by Jaggayya) (cameo appearance)
- Kanta Rao as Ramesh's father
- Jaggayya as Meena's husband
- Gummadi
- Rao Gopal Rao as Raja Gopalam
- Mohan Babu as Pottu Raju
- Raavi Kondala Rao as Meena's paternal uncle
- Sakshi Ranga Rao as general store owner
- Sarathi
- Nirmalamma as ayah

== Soundtrack ==
No.	Title	Lyrics	Singer(s)	Length
1.	"Yathra Yathra Ragunadha (Slokam)"		Chakravarthy
2.	"Jeevana Theeralu Nava Jeevana Theeralu"	Arudra	Chakravarthy
3.	"Nee Kannulalo Kalanai"	Athreya	S.P. Balasubrahmanyam, P. Susheela
4.	"Kerataniki Aaratam Theeram Cheralani"	C. Narayana Reddy	S.P. Balasubrahmanyam, S. Janaki
5.	"Nadireyi Outhunna"	Arudra	P. Susheela
6.	"Basthi Mae Saval Babu"	Athreya	S.P. Balasubrahmanyam
7.	"Ye Raagamani Paadanu"	Veturi	P. Susheela
8.	"Idhemi Lokam Ra"	Athreya	Madhavapeddi Ramesh, L. R. Anjali
