= Son of Alladin =

- Directed by: Singeetam Srinivasa Rao
- Screenplay by: Singeetam Srinivasa Rao
- Dialogues by: Mark Zaslove
- Story by: Singeetam Srinivasa Rao
- Produced by: V. Chandrasekharan
- Edited by: Venkata Krishnan M
- Music by: Pravin Mani
- Production company: Pentamedia Graphics
- Distributed by: Shemaroo
- Release date: 29 August 2003
- Running time: 80 minutes
- Country: India
- Language: English

Son of Alladin is a 2003 Indian animated film based on the life of the Aladdin written and directed by Singeetam Srinivasa Rao. Produced by Pentamedia Graphics, the film had 1100 shots and 125 characters.

The film won Special Mention in the Competition section at the 2003 International Children’s Film Festival Hyderabad, and was subsequently premiered at the 37th International Film Festival of India.

In 2016, the film was released as Mustafa & the Magician in Los Angeles and was submitted for consideration at the 89th Academy Awards for Best Animated Feature.

== Cast ==
=== Voice cast ===
- Pete Luciano
- Glenn Coulthard
- Joe Halls
- Marty Croft
- Cindy Carlton
- Kareen Oliver
- Allison Beecroft

=== Motion capture cast ===
- Suhaas Ahuja as Mustafa
- Meka Rajan as Laila
- Michael Muthu as Aladdin, King Ali, and Abu
- Sudhir Ahuja as Zeezeeba
- Rena Thiagarajan as Dayeena
- Sriya Chari as Habibi
- Sourabh Ahuja as Khan and Vazier
- Chandran Christian as Ghassan

== Production ==
The film was created using Blender.

== Soundtrack ==
The music was composed by Pravin Mani.

Track listing
No.	Title	Singer(s)	Length
1.	"Mustafa Theme"	Srinivas, Karthik, Timmy, Sean, Pravin Mani
2.	"Dream"	Glenn Coulson, Samyukta Ranganathan

== Reception ==
Chitra Mahesh of The Hindu wrote, "IT IS obvious that tremendous effort, time and money have gone into Pentamedia's 3-D animated film, Son Of Alladin. And the attempt is worthy of appreciation, fed as we are by the classic Disney animations that are unparalleled so far".

== See also ==
- List of Indian animated feature films
