= Panthulamma =

Pantulamma
- Poster
- Directed by: Singeetam Srinivasa Rao
- Screenplay by: Singeetam Srinivasa Rao
- Story by: Navata Arts
- Produced by: Navata Krishnam Raju
- Starring: Ranganath; Lakshmi; Deepa; Sarath Babu
- Cinematography: Balu Mahendra
- Edited by: D. Vasu
- Music by: Rajan–Nagendra
- Production company: Navata Arts
- Release date: 10 March 1978
- Country: India
- Language: Telugu

Pantulamma (lit. 'Lady teacher') is a 1978 Indian Telugu-language drama film co-written and directed by Singeetam Srinivasa Rao. The film won four Nandi Awards & one Filmfare Award. The song Sirimalle Neeve was borrowed from music director's own composition Baanallu Neene Bhuviyallu Neene from the 1976 Kannada movie Bayalu Daari.

== Cast ==
- Ranganath
- Lakshmi
- Deepa
- Sarath Babu
- Raavi Kondala Rao
- Girija

== Plot ==
Rajesh (Ranganadh) is a film actor who is widowed with a child. He is on the lookout for a teacher for his son. Rajesh's friend's (acted by Pradeep Shakthi) sister Sharada (Lakshmi) joins as the boys stay-at-home teacher. Rajesh is still very much attached to his late wife Sita (Deepa). He out on his work most of the time and house is run by his sister (Girija), who imposes her authority in the house by any means. Her doctor Sarat Babu helps her in carrying out some of her nefarious tasks.

Rajesh's sister is jealous of Sharada's growing influence on Rajesh and his son and keeps trying to get her to leave by attacking her character. Sharada, however, ignores all the insults in the interest of Rajesh and the child. Rajesh's sister, as a last resort, asks help of the Doctor to get rid of Sharada. The Doctor tries to force himself upon Sharada and when she resists, he boasts that Sita was in love with him and was about to divorce Rajesh, before she died. Rajesh sees and hears all of this and bashes the doctor up. In revenge, the Doctor gets a story published in newspapers which say Sita was having an affair with the Doctor before she died. Seeing the photos in the story, Rajesh believes Sita really cheated on him and is in deep sorrow.

Sharada takes it upon herself to prove to Rajesh that Sita was innocent. She is able get her hands on Sita's diary which details how she was forced by her sister-in-law to go to the doctor's house where she was drugged and her photos were taken and used to blackmail her, resulting in her killing herself. Knowing this, Rajesh is relieved from his sorrow and gets the Doctor arrested. Rajesh's sister also understands that her desire to control everything has caused all the problems. The film ends with Rajesh proposing to Sharada, to which she agrees.

== Soundtrack ==
All lyrics are written by Veturi.

No.	Title	Singer(s)	Length
1.	"Edarilo Koyila"	S. P. Balasubrahmanyam
2.	"Manasa Veena Madhu Geetam"	S. P. Balasubrahmanyam, P. Susheela
3.	"Manaserigina Vaadu"	P. Susheela
4.	"Pandaganti Vennelanta"	S. P. Balasubrahmanyam, P. Susheela
5.	"Sirimalle Neeve Virijallukaave"	S. P. Balasubrahmanyam
6.	"Teneteega Kudutunte"	S. P. Balasubrahmanyam, P. Susheela

== Awards ==
Nandi Awards

- Best Actress - Lakshmi
- Best Music Director - Rajan-Nagendra
- Best Lyricist - Veturi
- Best Child Actress - Baby Rani

Filmfare Awards South

- Filmfare Special Jury Award - Lakshmi
