= Kommineni Seshagiri Rao =

Indian film director (1939–2008)

- Born: 1939; Ponnekallu, Guntur district, A.P, India
- Died: 5 December 2008; Madras, India
- Occupations: Character artist, Director and Writer

Kommineni Seshagiri Rao was a Telugu film director. He was the brother of the music director Chakravarthy. He was born in Ponnekallu village, near Tadikonda in Guntur district, Andhra Pradesh, India.

== Film career ==
Kommineni Seshagiri Rao was an ardent fan of cinema from an early age. He started as an actor in Telugu cinema playing villains. During the period, his dialogue delivery in an aptly modulated reverberating voice bought him wide recognition. He portrayed a hero in the picture "Goppavari Gotralu". Subsequently, he acted in about 50 films, including Sri Krishna Pandaviyam, Thatha Manavadu (1972), and Samsaram Sagaram.

He served as a director for the film Devathalara Deevinchandi (1977), the maiden production by artist Giri Babu, and also for Babu's second picture, Simha Gharjana. The film Tayaramma Bangarayya (1979), produced by Edida Nageswara Rao on the Poornodaya banner, was a hit. Later it was remade in the Tamil language with Sivaji Ganesan as Satyamsundaram. He also directed Koteeswarudu, starring Akkineni Nageswara Rao; Cheyyethi Jai Kottu, starring Krishnam Raju; Lakshmipooja; and Mantradandam. Over a period of thirty years, Kommineni Seshagiri Rao directed around 30 films during his career.

He died on 5 December 2008 at Chennai due to multiple organ failure disease. He was survived by a wife, four sons and one daughter.

== Filmography ==
=== Director ===
1. Rathilayangal (1990)
2. Garjinchina Ganga (1988)
3. Tayaramma Tandava Krishna (1987)
4. Mantradandam (1985)
5. Maya Mohini (1985)
6. Baddi Bangaramma (1984)
7. Konte Kodallu (1983)
8. Koteeswarudu (1983)
9. Kotikokkadu (1983)
10. Raghu Ramudu (1983)
11. Nipputo Chelagaatam (1982)
12. Pellila Perayya (1982)
13. Bommala Koluvu (1980)
14. Laxmi Pooja (1979)
15. Tayaramma Bangarayya (1979)
16. Bomma Borusa Jeevam (1979)
17. Cheyithi Jai Kottu (1979)
18. Simha Garjana (1978)
19. Bhagya Lakshmi (1978)
20. Devathalara Deevinchandi (1977)

=== Writer ===
1. Laxmi Pooja (1979) (story and screenplay)
2. Devathalara Deevinchandi (1977) (story & screenplay)

=== Actor ===
1. Tata Manavadu (1972)
2. Bantrotu Bharya (1974)
3. Manushulanta Okkate (1976)
