= Ranganath (actor) =

Indian actor (1946–2015)

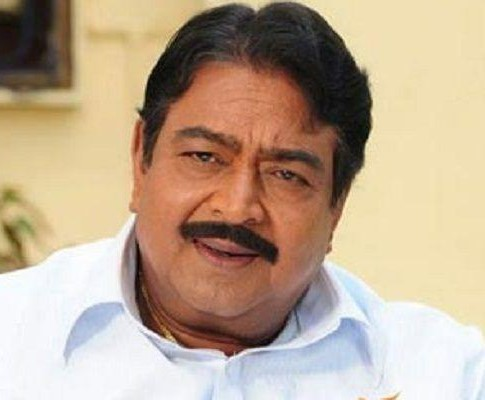
- Born: Tirumala Sundara Sri Ranganath; 17 July 1946; Madras, Madras Province, Dominion of India
- Died: 19 December 2015 (aged 69); Hyderabad, Telangana, India
- Education: Sri Venkateswara University
- Occupation: Actor
- Years active: 1969–2015
- Children: 3

Tirumala Sundara Sri Ranganath (17 July 1946 – 19 December 2015) was an Indian actor known for his works primarily in Telugu cinema and a few Tamil films. In a film career spanning more than forty years, Ranganath starred in more than three hundred feature films in a variety of roles. He made his debut with the 1969 Telugu film Buddhimantudu.

Subsequently, he starred in films such as Chandana, Zamindarugari Ammayi, America Ammayi, Devathalara Deevinchandi, Andame Anandam, Panthulamma and Intinti Ramayanam while establishing himself as one of the finest actors in Telugu cinema. Apart from acting in several serials, he has also directed a feature film titled Moguds Pellams (2005). Ranganath received state Nandi Awards for his works. Ranganath committed suicide at his residence in Hyderabad on 19 December 2015.

== Personal life ==
Ranganath was born Tirumala Sundara Sri Ranganath in Madras on 17 July 1946 into the family of T. R. Sundara Raju and T. R. Janaki Devi. He then graduated with a B.A. degree from Sri Venkateswara University, Tirupati. Ranganath then worked as ticket collector for the Indian Railways before becoming an actor. His wife Tirumala Chaithanya died in 2009. They had two daughters, and a son, Tirumala Nagendra Kumar.

== Death ==
Ranganath was found hanging in his residence at Hyderabad on 19 December 2015 at about 5 pm by his housemaid. Family members rushed him to the hospital, but he was declared dead on arrival. Police investigated the situation, and upon autopsy and further evidence, confirmed suicide.

== Filmography ==
=== Telugu ===
1. Buddhimantudu (1969)
2. Vintha Samsaram (1971) (Credited as Sri Ranganath) as Investigation Department Official
3. Chandana (1974) .. First movie as Hero
4. Palleseema (1974)
5. Chaduvu Samskaram (1974)
6. Zamindarugari Ammayi (1975) as Ramesh
7. Ramaya Tandri (1975)
8. America Ammayi (1976)
9. Pellade Bomma (1976)
10. Rattalu Rambabu (1976)
11. Secretary (1976)
12. Andame Anandam (1977)
13. Devathalara Deevinchandi (1977)
14. Panthulamma (1977)
15. Chiranjeevi Rambabu (1977) as Madhu
16. Ramachilaka (1978)
17. Love Marriage (1978) as Prasad
18. Gammattu Gudhachari (1978)
19. Lawyer Viswanath (17 November 1978)
20. Tayaramma Bangarayya (1979)
21. Intinti Ramayanam (1979)
22. Andadu Aagadu (1979) as Mohan
23. Maa Voori Devatha (1979) as Inspector Raghu
24. Priya Bhandavi (1979)
25. Andamaina Anubhavam (1979)
26. Madana Manjari (1980)
27. Love in Singapore (1980) as Prem
28. Mama Allulla Saval (1980) as Sathish
29. Navvuthu Brathakali (1980)
30. Badai Basavayya (1980) as Himself
31. Menatta Kuthuru (1980)
32. Dharmam Daari Tappithe (1980)
33. Alludu Pattina Bharatam (1980)
34. Snehamera Jeevitham (1980)
35. Lokam Pokada (1980)
36. Pasidi Moggalu (1980)
37. Erra Mallelu (1981)
38. Jeevitha Ratham (1981) as Chandram
39. Guvvala Janta (1981)
40. Nayudu Garabbai (1981)
41. Kala Rathri (1981) .. Latha
42. Gruha Pravesam (1982)
43. Raaga Deepam (1982)
44. Prema Nakshatram (1982)
45. Bangaru Kanuka (1982)
46. Madhura Swapnam (1982)
47. Ee Charitra Ae Siratho (1982)
48. Bandhalu Anubandhalu (1982)
49. Khaidi (1983)
50. Aalaya Sikharam (1983) as Rajashekhar
51. Adavalle Aligithe (1983)
52. Idhi Kaadu Mugimpu (1983) as Public Prosecutor
53. Raju Rani Jackie (1983) as Jagannath
54. Manishiki Maro Peru (1983)
55. Raghuramudu (1983) as Kumar
56. Koteeswarudu (1984) as Superintendent of police
57. Ee Chaduvulu Makkodu (1984)
58. Disco Dancer (1984)
59. Merupu Daadi (1984) as Professor Varma
60. Rowdy (1984) as Srikanth
61. Vijetha (1985)
62. Palnati Simham (1985)
63. Paripoyina Khaideelu (1985)
64. Bhale Thammudu (1985)
65. Adavi Donga (1985)
66. Chiranjeevi (1985) as Kumar
67. Edadugula Bandham (1985) as Janardhan
68. Intiko Rudramma (1985) as Inspector Chandrashekhar
69. Mayadari Maridi (1985)
70. Sri Datta Darshanam (1985)
71. Ashtalakshmi Vaibhavam (1986) as Mahishasura
72. Veta (1986)
73. Naga Devathe (1986)
74. Vetagallu (1986) as Mangapathi
75. Nampalli Nagu (1986)
76. Manavudu Danavudu (1986)
77. Kaliyuga Pandavulu (1986)
78. Maruthi (1986)
79. Jayam Manade (1986) as Ravindra
80. Ide Naa Samadhanam (1986) as Inspector Vikram
81. Kaliyuga Krishnudu (1986) as Vasudeva Rao
82. Chanakya Sapatham (1986) as Ranga
83. Brahma Rudrulu (1986) as Balaram
84. Donga Mogudu (1987)
85. Sankhavaram (1987)
86. Peliloi Pellilu (1987)
87. Bharatamlo Arjunudu (1987) as Ranganayakulu
88. Samrat (1987) as Phanibhushana Rao
89. Sthree Sahasam (1987) as Sudhakar
90. Gandhinagar Rendava Veedhi (1987)
91. Bhale Mogudu (1987)
92. Chakravarthy (1987)
93. Daada (1987)
94. Pagabattina Panchali(1987)
95. Bhargava Ramudu (1987)
96. Marana Homam (1987)
97. Sardar Krishnama Naidu (1987) as Chandrasekharam
98. Viswanatha Nayakudu (1987) as Veerasekhara Chola
99. Thandri Kodukula Challenge (1987) as Adv. Ramu
100. Antima Theerpu (1988)
101. Rocky (1988)
102. Chikkadu Dorakadu (1988)
103. Bharya Bhartalu (1988)
104. Trinetrudu (1988)
105. Marana Mrudangam (1988)
106. Raktabhishekam (1988)
107. Bharya Bhartalu (1988)
108. Bandipotu (1988) as Commissioner of Police
109. Dharma Teja (1988) as Ramkumar
110. Bharya Bhartalu (1988) as Ranga Rao
111. Ugranethrudu (1988) as Justice Harishchandra Prasad
112. Agni Keratalu (1988) as Chakradhar
113. State Rowdy (1989)
114. Rudranetra (1989)
115. Krishna Gari Abbayi (1989)
116. Sahasame Naa Oopiri (1989)
117. Muthyamantha Muddu (1989)
118. Simha Swapnam (1989)
119. Vicky Daada (1989) as D.I.G. Ranganatha Rao
120. Adavilo Abhimanyudu (1989) as Col. Raghuram
121. Kokila (1990)
122. Kodama Simham (1990)
123. Inspector Rudra (1990)
124. Kondaveeti Donga (1990)
125. Iddaru Iddare (1990)
126. Nayakuralu (1991)
127. Atiradhudu (1991) as Police Inspector
128. Prema Sikharam (1992)
129. Sahasam (1992)
130. Samrat Ashoka (1992) as Bindusara
131. Brindavanam (1992)
132. Donga Alludu (1993)
133. Pelli Gola (1993)
134. Mugguru Monagallu (1994)
135. Neram (1994)
136. Presidentgari Alludu (1994) as Gopinath
137. Cheemala Dandu (1995)
138. Mrugam (1996)
139. Amma Durgamma (1996)
140. Taraka Ramudu (1997)
141. Priyamaina Srivaru (1997)
142. Premante Idera (1998) as Venkatramayya
143. Subhalekhalu (1998)
144. Snehithulu (1998)
145. Police (1999) as Police Commissioner
146. Premaku Velayera (1999) as Ramanatham
147. Vichitram (1999) as Nadabrahma
148. Aasala Sandadi (1999)
149. Krishna Babu (1999)
150. Ravoyi Chandamama (1999)
151. Sambayya (1999) as Sivaramakrishnayya
152. Kalisundam Raa (2000) ... Ram Mohan
153. Adavi Chukka (2000)
154. Ganapathi (2000)
155. Vijayaramaraju (2000)
156. Okkadu Chalu (2000) ... Commissioner
157. Sri Srimati Satyabhama (2000)
158. Ammaye Navvithe (2001) ... Seshadri Naidu
159. Eduruleni Manishi (2001)
160. Sampangi (2001)
161. Narahari (2001)
162. Subhakaryam (2001)
163. Repallelo Radha (2001)
164. Naalo Unna Prema (2001)
165. Apparao Ki Oka Nela Tappindi (2001)
166. Premalo Pavani Kalyan (2002)
167. Police Sisters (2002)
168. Raghava (2002)
169. Manmadhudu (2002)
170. Kondaveeti Simhasanam (2002)
171. Nijam (2003) ... Venkateswarlu
172. Villain (2003)
173. Sakhiya (2004)
174. Adavi Ramudu (2004)
175. Varsham (2004)
176. Andhrawala (2004)
177. Laxmi (2004)
178. Radha Gopalam (2005)
179. Kunkuma (2005)
180. Devi Abhayam (2005)
181. Moguds Pellams (2005) – Director
182. Annavaram (2006)
183. Samanyudu (2006) ... Chandra Shekhar
184. Sri Ramadasu (2006)
185. Lakshmi (2006)
186. Hanumanthu (2006)
187. Evadaithe Nakenti (2007)
188. Sri Satyanarayana Swamy (2007)
189. Nee Sukhame Ne Koruthunna (2008)
190. Bhadradri (2008)
191. Sundarakanda (2008)
192. Victory (2008)
193. Mitrudu (2009)
194. Aha Naa Pellanta (2011)
195. Sanchalanam (2011)
196. Daggaraga Dooramga (2011)
197. Solo (2011)
198. Rushi (2012)
199. Dammu (2012)
200. Devaraya (2012)
201. Sri Vasavi Kanyaka Parameswari Charitra (2014)
202. I am in Love (2014)
203. Cut Cheste (2014)
204. Vengamamba (2014)
205. Gopala Gopala (2015)

=== Tamil ===
1. Kai Kodukkum Kai (1984)
2. Navagraha Nayagi (1985)
3. Raja Rishi (1985)
4. Naam (1985)
5. Ungal Anbu Thangachi (1994)
6. Devan (2002)
7. Aanai (2005)

=== Other languanges ===
1. Neelambari (2001) (Kannada)
2. Grama Devathe (2001) (Kannada)
3. 3 Deewarein (2003) (Hindi) ... Chief Justice S. S. Murthy

== Television ==
- Santhi Nivasam (ETV)
- My Name Is Mangathayaaru as KMR (Zee Telugu)
- Iddaru Ammayilu as Venkata Raju (Zee Telugu)
- Atto Attama Kooturo (Gemini TV)
- Mogalirekulu (Gemini TV)
