= America Ammayi (film) =

- Theatrical release poster
- Directed by: Singeetam Srinivasa Rao
- Written by: Gollapudi Maruti Rao (dialogues)
- Screenplay by: Singeetam Srinivasa Rao
- Story by: A. P. Nagarajan
- Produced by: Navata Krishnam Raju
- Starring: Annick Chaymotty; Ranganath; Deepa; Sreedhar; Pandari Bai
- Cinematography: Balu Mahendra
- Edited by: D. Vasu
- Music by: G. K. Venkatesh
- Production company: Navata Arts
- Release date: 19 November 1976
- Country: India
- Language: Telugu

America Ammayi (transl. American Girl) is a 1976 Indian Telugu-language film directed by Singeetam Srinivasa Rao, who co-wrote the screenplay with A. P. Nagarajan. The cross over film was based on the story of Telugu cultural importance in comparison to the western culture. French dancer Annick Chaymotty, known under her stage name Devayani, acted in the main role. She was learning Kuchipudi dance from Vempati Chinna Satyam. The film was a remake of the 1975 Tamil film Melnaattu Marumagal.

== Plot ==
Sridhar is an Indian youth staying in the United States. He marries an American woman Neena and brings her to India. His parents refuse to accept her into their house. Neena learns the Indian culture including language, dance and singing and impresses them. They finally accept her as their daughter-in-law.

== Cast ==
- Annick Chaymotty as Neena/Meena
- Ranganath as Anand
- Deepa as Sudha
- Sreedhar as Mohan
- Pandari Bai as Janaki
- Gummadi
- Kantha Rao
- Sarath Babu as Raju
- Raja Babu
- Rama Prabha

== Production ==
America Ammayi was directed by Singeetam Srinivasa Rao and produced by N Krishnam Raju of Navata Arts. Cinematography is by Balu Mahendra. In the title card, the lead actress Annick Chaymotty alias Devayani is erroneously credited as Anna Koria/Devayani.

== Soundtrack ==
The music of the film was composed by G. K. Venkatesh. The song "Oka Venuvu Vinipinchenu" marks the playback singing debut of G. Anand. G.K. Venkatesh reused the tune of "Kannanchina Ee Maatali" from his 1975 Kannada movie Daari Tappida Maga as "Oka Venuvu Vinipinchenu" in this movie.

Track listing
No.	Title	Lyrics	Singer(s)	Length
1.	"Aame Thoti Matundi"	Mailavarapu Gopi	S. P. Balasubrahmanyam
2.	"Ananda Tandavamade Shivudu"	C. Narayana Reddy	P. Susheela
3.	"Jilibili Siggula"		S. P. Balasubrahmanyam, Vani Jairam
4.	"Oka Venuvu Vinipinchenu Anuraga Geethika"	Mailavarapu Gopi	G. Anand
5.	"Paadana Tenugu Paata Paravasamai Nee Eduta Mee Paata"	Devulapalli Krishnasastri	P. Susheela
6.	"Tell Me, Tell Me, Tell Me"	Aarudhra	S. P. Balasubrahmanyam, S. Janaki
