= Tharam Marindi =

1977 film by Singeetam Srinivasa Rao

- Poster
- Directed by: Singeetam Srinivasa Rao
- Screenplay by: Singeetam Srinivasa Rao
- Story by: Madireddy Sulochana
- Produced by: G. Radhakrishna Murthy
- Cinematography: Balu Mahendra
- Music by: G. K. Venkatesh
- Production company: Vishwabharati Movies
- Release date: 4 November 1977
- Running time: 143 minutes
- Country: India
- Language: Telugu

Tharam Marindi (transl. The Generation Has Changed) is a 1977 Indian Telugu-language drama film written and directed by Singeetam Srinivasa Rao. The film won two Nandi Awards.

== Plot ==
An ageing man has his daughter Chenna married to a much older man, a drunkard, because he had earlier promised that man dowry. The ageing man's son, who is progressive in nature, is against this trade and defies his father by marrying a woman named Parvati. Due to societal issues, the son is forced to set up residence in the Harijan section of the village and forced to involve himself in corrupt village politics.

== Cast ==
Adapted from Encyclopaedia of Indian Cinema:

- Sridhar
- G.S.R. Murthy
- Dasarathi
- Prasadrao
- G. Satyanarayana
- M. Panchanadam
- Lakshmikant
- Pradeep
- Pallavi
- Shoba as Chenna
- Rajakumari
- Seethalatha
- Satyavati
- Sudha
- Lakshmamma

== Production ==
Tharam Marindi was directed and written by Singeetam Srinivasa Rao, based on a story by Madireddy Sulochana, and filmed by Balu Mahendra. It was produced by G. Radhakrishna Murthy under Vishwabharati Movies.

== Themes ==
The film addresses rural Telangana politics.

== Soundtrack ==
The music was composed by G. K. Venkatesh, with lyrics by Sri Sri and Kopalle Sivaram.

== Release and reception ==
Tharam Marindi was released on 4 November 1977. Despite being a commercial failure, it won the Nandi Award for Second Best Feature Film.

== Impact ==
Along with Chillara Devullu (1975) and Voorummadi Brathukulu (1976), which also explore rural Telangana politics, Tharam Marindi constituted a wave of realist New Telugu cinema.

== Awards ==
Nandi Awards – 1977

- Second Best Feature Film – Silver – G. Radha Krishnamurthy
- Second Best Story Writer – Madhireddy Sulochana

== Bibliography ==
- Rajadhyaksha, Ashish; Willemen, Paul (1998) [1994]. Encyclopaedia of Indian Cinema. British Film Institute and Oxford University Press. ISBN 0-19-563579-5.
