= Singeetham Srinivasa Rao =

Indian filmmaker (1931–2026)

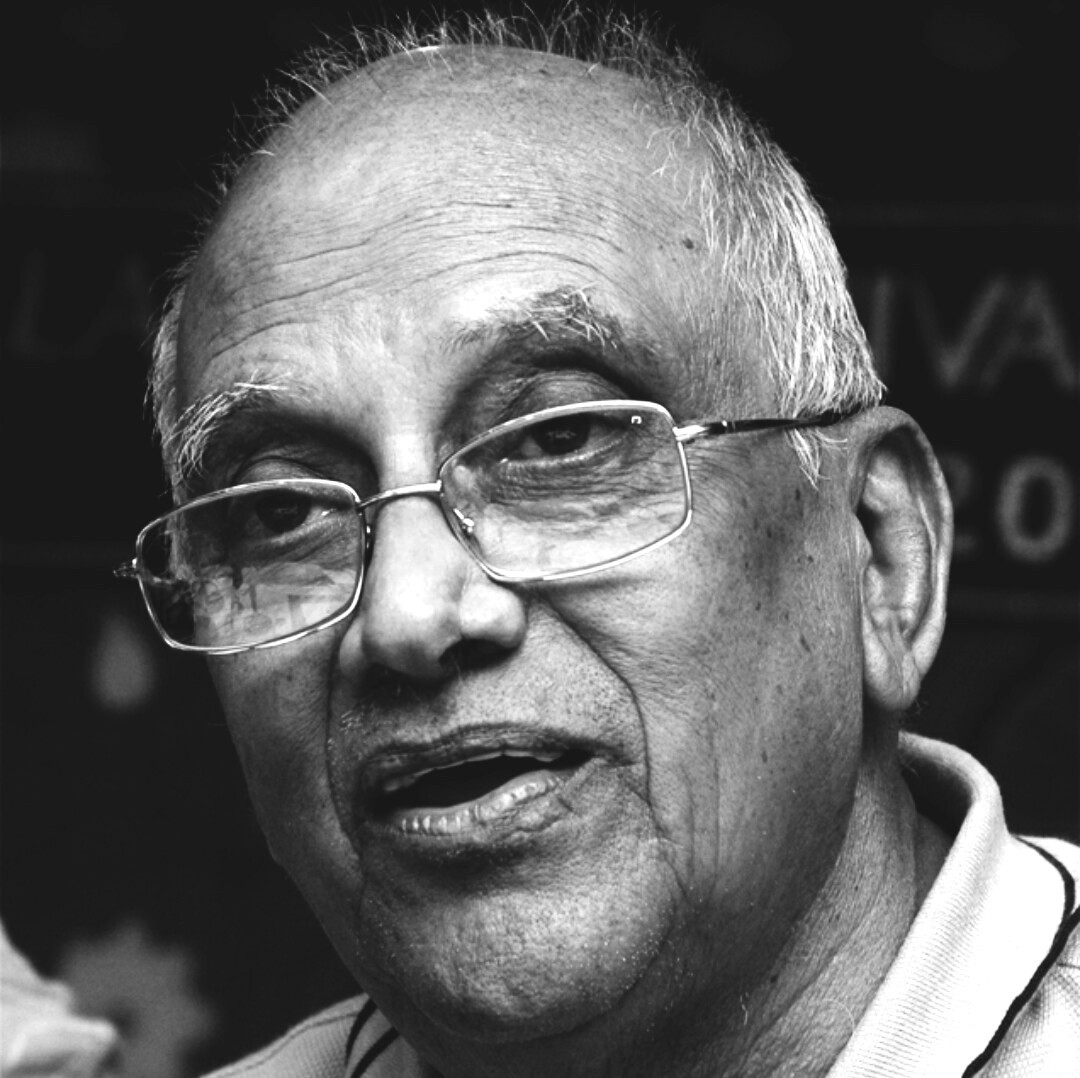
- Singeetham Srinivasa Rao at an event
- Born: Singeetham Srinivasa Rao; 21 September 1931; Gudur, Madras Presidency, British India (now in Andhra Pradesh, India)
- Died: 3 October 2026 (aged 95); Chennai, Tamil Nadu, India
- Education: University of Madras
- Occupations: Film director; screenwriter; producer; composer; actor
- Years active: 1972–2026
- Notable work: Full list
- Spouse: Lakshmi Kalyani
- Children: 2

Singeetham Srinivasa Rao (21 September 1931 – 3 October 2026) was an Indian filmmaker, producer, music composer and actor. He was widely regarded as one of India's most versatile and innovative filmmakers. Srinivasa Rao directed around 60 films across multiple genres and languages, including Telugu, Kannada, Tamil, Hindi, and English and was credited with revolutionizing South Indian cinema through his experimental approach. He garnered numerous accolades throughout his career, including two National Film Awards, five Nandi Awards, three Karnataka State Film Awards, and three Filmfare Awards South. In 2011, he was honoured with the Life Achievement Award by the Film Federation of India.

Srinivasa Rao began his career as an assistant to the esteemed director K. V. Reddy, working on iconic films such as Mayabazar (1957) and Jagadeka Veeruni Katha (1961). He made his directorial debut with the Telugu film Neethi Nijayithi (1972), and subsequently directed critically acclaimed social problem films like Dikkatra Parvathi (1974), which won the National Film Award for Best Feature Film in Tamil, and Tharam Marindi (1977), which won Nandi Award for Best Feature Film.

He went on to direct notable films like Panthulamma (1978), Mayuri (1985), Anand (1986), Pushpaka Vimana (1987), Aditya 369 (1991), Brundavanam (1992), Magalir Mattum (1994), Bhairava Dweepam (1994), Madam (1994), and Son of Aladdin (2003). Mayuri won a record 14 Nandi Awards, while Pushpaka Vimana, a dialogue-less film, earned the National Film Award for Best Popular Film. Aditya 369 and Bhairava Dweepam are considered landmark films in the science fiction and fantasy genres, respectively, within Telugu cinema.

Srinivasa Rao was also known for his collaborations with actors Rajkumar and Kamal Haasan, which resulted in several commercially successful and critically acclaimed films. With Kamal Haasan, he worked on films such as Sommokadidhi Sokokadidihi (1979), Raja Paarvai / Amavasya Chandrudu (1981), Pushpaka Vimana (1987), Apoorva Sagodharargal (1989) and Michael Madana Kama Rajan (1990). His collaboration with Rajkumar produced films like Haalu Jenu (1982), Chalisuva Modagalu (1982), Eradu Nakshatragalu (1983), and Bhagyada Lakshmi Baramma (1986).

In 2026, veteran filmmaker Singeetham Srinivasa Rao announced his return to directing with a new project, provisionally titled SSR61, marking his first film in ten years, which would eventually become his final work. The film is titled Sing Geetham, a musical fantasy.

== Early life ==
Singeetham Srinivasa Rao was born on 21 September 1931 in a Telugu Brahmin family in Gudur of Nellore district, Madras Presidency. His father, Ramachandra Rao, was a headmaster and his mother, Sakunthala Bai, was a violinist. As a school student, he showed glimpses of talent both in plays and music. He graduated with a Physics Degree from Presidency College, Chennai. In college, he honed his skills in plays such as Windows under Harindranath Chattopadhyay.

== Career ==
=== Early career ===
After graduation his ambition was to get into films. As his attempts to meet the director K. V. Reddy failed, he took up the job of a teacher in Sullurupeta. But he continued writing and wrote two experimental award-winning plays Bhrama and Anthyaghattam. He also wrote Chitrarjuna, a musical play adopted from Tagore's Chitra - Prince of the Dark Chamber. It was translated into English by Scottish dramatist Tom Buchan for an American television channel. He also worked as a journalist at the time writing for Telugu Swatantra.

=== Telugu cinema ===
His efforts to meet his favourite director K. V. Reddy continued and succeeded in 1954 he was finally able to meet him. K. V. Reddy gave him a copy of The Monkey's Paw and asked him to write a script based on it. Srinivasa Rao wrote the script along with dialogues in three months. K. V. Reddy was impressed and took him on as an apprentice. He later graduated as an associate director under K. V. Reddy and worked with him for all his films from Donga Ramudu (1955) until Uma Chandi Gowri Sankarula Katha (1968) including Mayabazar (1957), Jagadeka Veeruni Katha (1961), Sri Krishnarjuna Yuddham (1963).

In 1972, Srinivasa Rao ventured into film direction with Neethi Nijayithi, an offbeat Telugu film. The film won critical acclaim but was not commercially successful. He then directed the social problem film Tharam Marindi (1977) which won the Nandi Award for Best Feature Film.

Srinivasa Rao made other successful Telugu films like Zamindaru gari Ammayi (1975), America Ammayi (1976), Panthulamma (1978), Sommokadidhi Sokokadidhi (1979), Mayuri (1985), America Abbayi (1987), Aditya 369 (1991), Brundavanam (1992), Bhairava Dweepam (1994), Madam (1994). Mayuri won a record 14 Nandi Awards including the Nandi Award for Best Feature Film. Srinivasa Rao won the Nandi Award for Best Screenplay Writer for Brundavanam and the Nandi Award for Best Director for Bhairava Dweepam. Aditya 369 and Bhairava Dweepam are considered classic films in science fiction and fantasy genres respectively in Telugu cinema.

He made over half of his films in Telugu. He directed nearly 30 Telugu films across genres. His most recent film was Welcome Obama (2013). The story deals with commercial surrogacy in India where women are used as surrogates by foreigners and tells the story of one such surrogate mother who bears a foreigner's child.

Srinivasa Rao was also roped in as a mentor for the upcoming Telugu science fiction film Project K. Made at an estimated budget of ₹600 crore, it is one of the most expensive Indian films ever made. He gave his inputs and opinion on the film's script as a part of the mentorship.

=== Kannada cinema ===
Srinivasa Rao was the executive director of the 1970 Kannada movie Samskara directed by Pattabhirama Reddy. It won the President's gold medal for National Film Award for Best Feature Film. Singeetham made his Kannada directorial debut with the 1982 blockbuster Haalu Jenu starring Rajkumar. He went on to direct six more Kannada blockbusters with Rajkumar - Chalisuva Modagalu (1982), Eradu Nakshatragalu (1983), Shravana Banthu (1984), Jwaalamukhi (1985), Bhagyada Lakshmi Baramma (1986) and Devatha Manushya (1988). Two of these were based on novels. He was selected to direct the historical Amoghavarsha Nrupathunga which was supposed to be Rajkumar's 200th movie but eventually dropped. However, he subsequently went on to direct Devatha Manushya (1988) which happened to be Rajkumar's 200th film.

His other popular Kannada directorial films include Anand (1986) and Chiranjeevi Sudhakar (1988) apart from Ksheera Sagara (1992), Tuvvi Tuvvi Tuvvi (1999) and Makeup (2002) in the latter part of his career. He co-wrote the screenplay for two Kannada movies produced by Rajkumar's banner that were not directed by him - Shruthi Seridaaga (1987) and Samyuktha (1988). He was also the script-writer of Belliyappa Bangarappa (1992). A disciple of legendary composer S. Rajeswara Rao, he has composed music for two Kannada films - Bhagyada Lakshmi Baramma and Samyuktha.

Most of the films he directed in Kannada were produced by Parvathamma Rajkumar and all were critically and commercially successful. Of the seven films Srinivasa Rao directed with Rajkumar in lead roles, four movies were remade in Telugu. Singeetham's association with Rajkumar was a rare one where he not only directed cult classics and landmark movies but also co-wrote screenplay and composed music for movies produced by the actor even though they were not directed by him. This stands as a testimony for the faith Rajkumar had in the abilities of Rao and the admiration Srinivasa had for Rajkumar. In 1988, when Rajkumar announced his desire to temporarily retire from acting, Singeetham decided to concentrate on Tamil movies where he mostly had Kamal Haasan in the lead roles.

The Kannada Film Journalists Association has honoured Srinivasa Rao with a Special Biography. Srinivasa Rao received three Karnataka State Film Awards — two for Best Screenplay and one for Best movie.

=== Lyricist and composer ===
Srinivasa Rao composed lyrics for films like Bhairava Dweepam (1994) and soundtracks for a few Kannada films. He edited many magazines in Telugu such as Bharati, and scripted plays like Brahma, Antya Ghattam, and Chitrārjuna. Chitrārjuna was also translated into English, and was telecasted in American Television. A disciple of legendary composer S. Rajeswara Rao, he has also composed music for two Kannada movies of matinee idol Rajkumar's banner - Bhagyada Lakshmi Baramma (which was directed by him) and Samyuktha - (which was not directed by him).

=== Innovative cinema ===
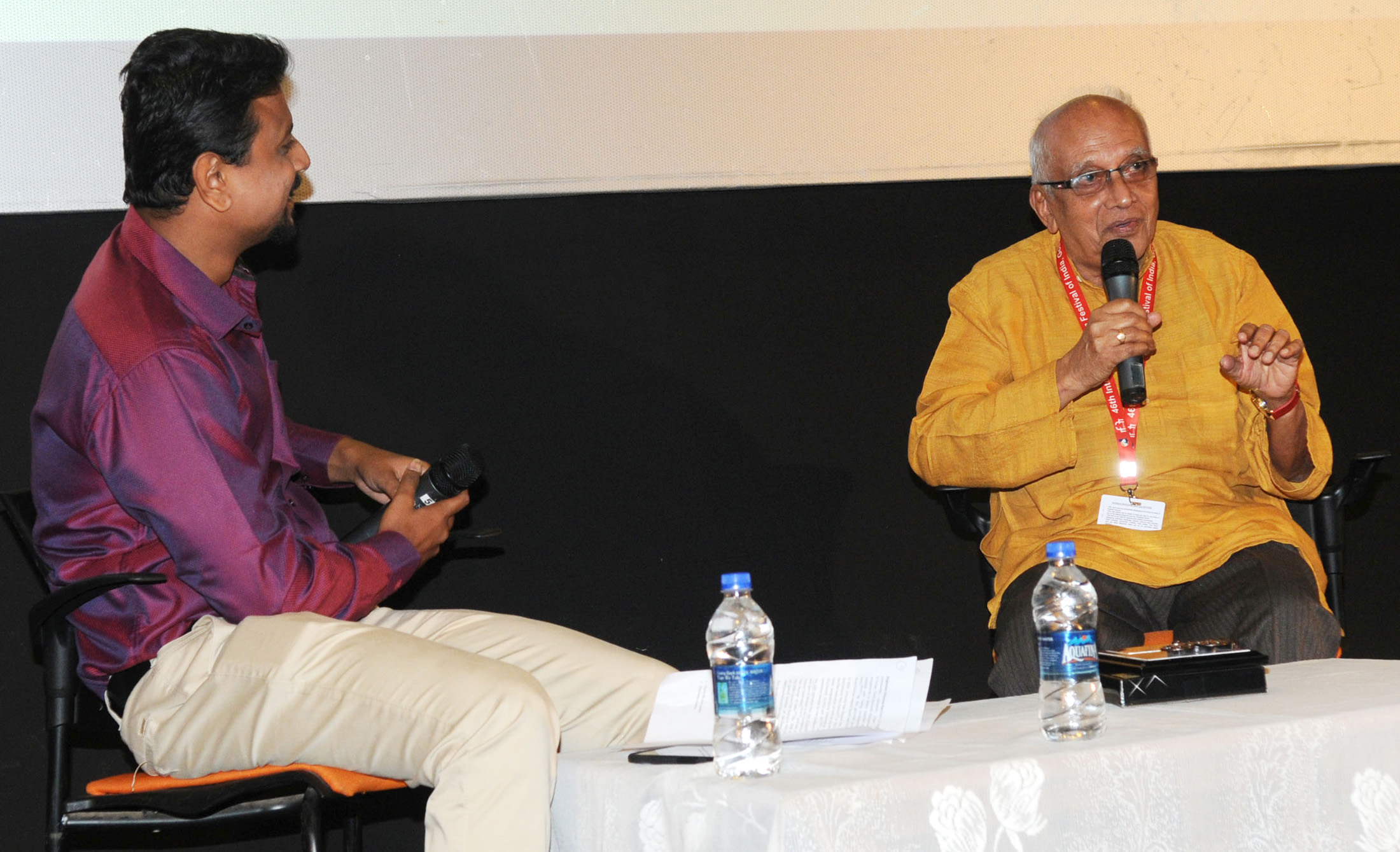
Srinivasa Rao (right) at IFFI 2015

The 1984 Telugu biographical dance film, Mayuri, which won the National Film Award – Special Mention (Feature Film), was premiered at the 1985 International Film Festival of India, has also received several state Awards, including the State Nandi Award for Best Feature Film, and Filmfare Award South for Best Direction. The film was later remade into Hindi as Naache Mayuri.

In 1988, he co-produced, scripted and directed the first Indian dialogue-less film, Pushpaka Vimana which received special mention at Shanghai Film Festival. When he was working with Rajkumar, Srinivasa Rao was introduced to Rajkumar's relative, actor Shringar Nagaraj who decided to co-produce Pushpaka Vimana. The film was listed among CNN-IBN's 'Hundred greatest Indian films of all time'.

The comedy-drama blockbuster Apoorva Sagodharargal (1989) was one of the enduring works on dwarfism in popular media. The film won the Filmfare Award for Best Film – Tamil, and was premiered at the International Film Festival of India. The Telugu crossover films like America Ammayi (1976), and America Abbayi (1987) were box office hits. The 1990 action comedy, Michael Madana Kama Rajan - a movie about quadruplets - became an instant hit at the box office.

The Telugu science fiction film Aditya 369 was one of the highest grossing Telugu films of 1991, grossing ₹9 crore at the box office. A sequel, entitled Aditya 999, was delayed indefinitely in July 2016. Another science fiction in Tamil, Chinna Vathiyar was also an instant hit. The 1994, folklore Bhairava Dweepam garnered the state Nandi Award for Best Direction.

The 2003 animation film, Son of Aladdin, had 1100 shots and 125 characters. The film won Special Mention in the Competition section at the 2003 International Children's Film Festival Hyderabad, and subsequently premiered at the 37th International Film Festival of India. The 2008 animation film Ghatothkach received special mention at the Grand Finale - Children's Film Festival 2014 of the 44th International Film Festival of India.

=== Later projects ===
Srinivasa Rao planned to make a sequel to Aditya 369. He also expressed his wish to direct a pre-recorded experimental film — a musical in which he wanted to use pre-recorded sequences and dialogues while shooting. Srinivasa Rao also wanted to make a documentary on the making of Apoorva Sagodhararkal, and to write a book on the making of Pushpaka Vimana, as well as an autobiography in the form of a screenplay.

In July 2026, the fantasy-comedy musical film directed by him, Sing Geetham, was released. Blending a novel narrative style with entertainment and music, produced by Vyjayanthi Movies, with music composed by Devi Sri Prasad, and written by Gautami Challagulla (story, screenplay, and dialogues), the film received positive reviews.

== Collaborators ==
Srinivasa Rao is particularly noted for his collaboration with two actors - Dr. Rajkumar and Kamal Haasan - which resulted in commercially successful and critically acclaimed movies. With Kamal Haasan he made films such as Pushpaka Vimana (1987), Apoorva Sagodharargal (1990) and Michael Madana Kama Rajan (1991) among others, He also directed Kamal Haasan in his 100th film Raja Paarvai / Amavasya Chandrudu (1981).

He directed Rajkumar in seven Kannada films in the 1980s. Notable among them are Haalu Jenu (1982), Chalisuva Modagalu (1982), Bhagyada Lakshmi Baramma (1986), and Rajkumar's 200th film Devatha Manushya (1988). He was also the first person to direct Dr. Rajkumar and all his three sons. He directed Shiva Rajkumar and Raghavendra Rajkumar in their debut movies, Anand (1986) and Chiranjeevi Sudhakar (1988) respectively. He had also directed Puneeth Rajkumar as a child artiste in Eradu Nakshatragalu in which he played dual role. Most of his Kannada films were produced by Parvathamma Rajkumar whose ability to judge what would work with the audience and whose story-picking knack he believed in. He was the only director to have worked with her on at least one film in each of the seven years during 1982 to 1988.

Srinivasa Rao also collaborated with Balakrishna in three films — the science fiction film Aditya 369 (1991), fantasy film Bhairava Dweepam (1994), and the mythological film Sri Krishnarjuna Vijayam (1996). Aditya 369 and Bhairava Dweepam are considered landmark films in science fiction and fantasy genres respectively in Telugu cinema. He directed Rajendra Prasad in two films — Brundavanam (1992) and Madam (1994). Both were commercially successful.

Kannada actor Shivaram has been a part of all seven movies of Srinivasa Rao starring Rajkumar. B. C. Gowrishankar, a regular cameraman for Rajkumar movies, was selected as the cinematographer for Srinivasa Rao's later movies - Pushpaka Vimana, Michael Madana Kama Rajan and the Hindi movie Phool (1993). Another regular technician of Rajkumar movies - art director Peketi Ranga - was also selected as the art director for Srinivasa Rao's Michael Madana Kama Rajan.

== Death ==
Srinivasa Rao died at the Kauvery hospital in Chennai, Tamil Nadu, on 3 October 2026, at the age of 95.

== Influences ==
His favourite litterateurs are Vemana, Mark Twain, and P. G. Wodehouse. He felt no one has expressed the truths of everyday life better than Vemana. He was introduced to Mark Twain by an American missionary when he was eight. He considered Robin Hood to be his favourite hero of fiction.

== Legacy ==
Singeetham Srinivasa Rao is widely regarded as one of India's most versatile and innovative filmmakers. He is acclaimed for revolutionizing South Indian cinema through his experimental approach. Notable for his contributions to the science fiction and fantasy genres, Aditya 369 and Bhairava Dweepam are celebrated as landmark films within Telugu cinema.

Prasanth Varma has cited Singeetham as his primary inspiration, particularly admiring his ability to create a diverse body of work without repeating himself. Similarly, Nag Ashwin has expressed admiration for Bhairava Dweepam and Aditya 369, considering them among his favourite films. He even asked Singeetham for guidance during the scripting stage and filming of Kalki 2898 AD (2024) to refine it and deliver a quality product.

== Accolades ==
In 2010, Srinivasa Rao headed the Jury of the Indian Panorama at the 8th Chennai International Film Festival. In 2011, Srinivasa Rao received the Life Achievement Award from the Film Federation of India at the 4th Global Film Festival. Srinivasa Rao was also the Guest of honor alongside Barrie Osbourne at the Media and Entertainment Business Conclave 2012 hosted by FICCI and FFI. In 2012, Srinivasa Rao served as one of the selection committee members for the Sundance Institute's screenwriters lab.

19th Chennai International Film Festival

- Life Time Achievement Award (2021)

Film Federation of India

- Life Time Achievement Award (2011)

National Film Awards

- 1973 – National Film Award for Best Feature Film in Tamil – Dikkatra Parvathi
- 1988 – National Film Award for Best Popular Film Providing Wholesome Entertainment – (Kannada) – Pushpaka Vimana

Nandi Awards

- 1985 – Best Screenplay Writer – Mayuri
- 1985 – Best Director – Mayuri
- 1992 – Best Screenplay Writer – Brundavanam
- 1994 – Best Director – Bhairava Dweepam
- 2012 – BN Reddy National Award for Life Time Achievement

Karnataka State Film Awards

- 1982 – Karnataka State Film Award for First Best Film – Haalu Jenu
- 1985 – Karnataka State Film Award for Best Screenplay – Bhagyada Lakshmi Baramma
- 1986 – Karnataka State Film Award for Best Screenplay – Anand

Filmfare Awards South

- 1974 – Filmfare Award for Best Film – Tamil – Dikkatra Parvathi
- 1985 – Filmfare Best Director Award (Telugu) – Mayuri
- 1987 – Filmfare Award for Best Director - Kannada – Pushpaka Vimana
