= Success (2003 film) =

- Poster
- Directed by: Suresh Prasanna
- Produced by: Isakki Sundar
- Starring: Dushyanth; Sonia Agarwal; Nandana
- Cinematography: Ravindhar
- Music by: Deva
- Production company: Issakki Creations
- Release date: 5 September 2003
- Country: India
- Language: Tamil

Success is a 2003 Indian Tamil-language film written and directed by Suresh Prasanna. The film stars newcomer Dushyanth in the lead role, alongside Sonia Agarwal and Nandana.

== Cast ==
- Dushyanth as Ganesh
- Sonia Agarwal as Swetha
- Nandana as Maha
- Roja as Radhika
- Karunas as Ganesh's Friend
- Urvashi as Kicha's Wife
- Y. Gee. Mahendra as Kicha and Maha's Father
- Riyaz Khan as Kicha
- Abhinay
- Mahanadi Shankar as local Rowdy
- Nanditha Jennifer as item number in Pothe Konjam Pothe

== Production ==
Producer Issaki Sundar saw Dushyanth, the son of Ramkumar Ganesan and grandson of Sivaji Ganesan, at the Sivaji Productions office and offered him the opportunity to make his acting debut. He initially rejected the offer, but ultimately agreed after consulting with his uncle Prabhu and cousin Vikram Prabhu. Dushyanth was also credited as Junior Sivaji during the production of the film. The film was named Success, after the first on screen dialogue of Sivaji from the film Parasakthi (1952).

== Soundtrack ==
Music was composed by Deva.

Song	Singers	Lyrics	Length
Hey Un Vayasena	Karthik, Mathangi	Viveka	05:01
Othu Konjam Othu	Udit Narayan	Vaali	05:16
Kodi Muppathu	Tippu, Kovai Kamala	Vaali	05:09
Marathi Kutti	KK, Mahalakshmi Iyer	Snehan	04:32
Kanna Un	Anuradha Sriram, P. Unnikrishnan	Kabilan	05:27

== Reception ==
The reviewer from Sify wrote, "Dushyanth, the new hero has no mannerisms or looks of his grandfather, late legendary Sivaji Ganesan. However this young man has tried his best to look convincing in his debut film that looks more like a mega serial". Shobha Warrier of Rediff.com wrote "Director Suresh Prasanna is directionless and clueless from the beginning. It seems like the only direction he had is to make a Sivaji Ganesan film and make Dushyant another Sivaji". Malini Mannath of Chennai Online felt that Dushyanth must "work on his expressions in the more intense scenes", Nandana was underutilised and Karunas was "plainly irritating" with his "loud monotone and supposedly comic antics".
