= Ramkumar Ganesan =

Indian film producer and actor (born 1954)

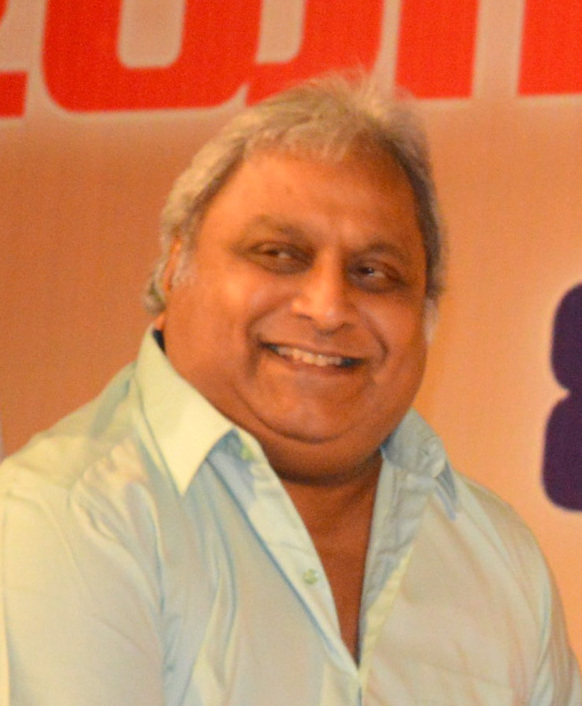
- Ramkumar in 2016
- Born: Ramkumar Ganesan; 3 July 1954 (age 72); Chennai, Tamil Nadu, India
- Occupations: Film producer, actor
- Years active: 1986-present
- Political party: BJP (2021)
- Spouse(s): Meenakshi; Kannammal
- Children: 4, including Dushyanth and Shivaji Dev
- Parent(s): Sivaji Ganesan (father); Kamala (mother)
- Relatives: Prabhu (brother); Vikram Prabhu (nephew)

Ramkumar Ganesan (born 3 July 1954) is an Indian film producer and actor. He is the eldest son of veteran actor Sivaji Ganesan and the head of Sivaji Productions, a film production company that has produced several films, particularly featuring his father Sivaji Ganesan and his younger brother Prabhu.

== Early life ==
Born in Chennai, Tamil Nadu, India, Ramkumar is the eldest son of Tamil actor Sivaji Ganesan and the older brother of Tamil actor Prabhu, Shanti and Thenmozhi. He studied at Bishop Cotton Boys' School, Bangalore. He graduated with a degree in business administration from Vivekananda College and began working at the production company Sivaji Productions established by his father.

== Career ==
Ramkumar took over Sivaji Productions after his uncle V. C. Shanmugham had died. The company is being led by Ramkumar along with his brother Prabhu. The most notable production under Ramkumar remains the blockbuster Chandramukhi in 2005. In 2009, the brothers produced the film Aasal starring Ajith Kumar. Ramkumar has also acted in a couple of films, playing notable supporting roles in Aruvadai Naal and My Dear Marthandan, both starring Prabhu. He appeared as one of the antagonists in director Shankar's I.

== Personal life ==
Ramkumar married Kannamal with whom he have three sons, Dushyanth who works with Sivaji Productions and has acted in the Tamil films Success and Machi, and twins Dharshan and Rishyan. He also has a son Shivaji Dev from his marriage with Meenakshi, Sripriya's sister.

== Filmography ==
As Producer
Year	Film	Language	Director	Notes
1986	Aruvadai Naal	Tamil	G. M. Kumar	
1987	Anand	Tamil	C. V. Rajendran	
1988	En Thamizh En Makkal	Tamil	Santhana Bharathi	
1989	Vetri Vizha	Tamil	Pratap Pothan	
1990	My Dear Marthandan	Tamil	Pratap Pothan	
1991	Thalattu Ketkuthamma	Tamil	Rajkapoor	
1992	Mannan	Tamil	P.Vasu	
1993	Kalaignan	Tamil	G. B. Vijay	
1994	Rajakumaran	Tamil	R. V. Udayakumar	
2005	Chandramukhi	Tamil	P.Vasu	
2005	White Rainbow	Hindi	Dharan Mandrayar	As associate producer
2007	Delhii Heights	Hindi	Anand Kumar	
2010	Aasal	Tamil	Saran	

As actor
Year	Title	Role	Notes
1986	Aruvadai Naal	Father Vicent Parker Soosai	
1990	My Dear Marthandan		Special appearance
2005	Chandramukhi		Special appearance in the song "Devuda Devuda"
2015	I	Indrakumar	
2019	LKG	Bhojappan	
2019	Boomerang	Akash	
2022	Kaari	Sethu's coach	
2023	Modern Love Chennai	Doctor	Segment: Ninaivo Oru Paravai
2025	Theeyavar Kulai Nadunga	Varadharajan	
