= Meen Kuzhambum Mann Paanaiyum =

2016 Indian film by Amudheshwar

- Theatrical release poster
- Directed by: Amudheshwar
- Written by: Amudheshwar
- Produced by: Dushyanth Ramkumar; Abiramidevi Ramkumar
- Starring: Prabhu; Kalidas Jayaram; Ashna Zaveri; Pooja Kumar
- Cinematography: Laxman Kumar
- Edited by: Richard Kevin
- Music by: D. Imman
- Production company: Eshan Productions
- Distributed by: Cosmo Village
- Release date: 11 November 2016
- Country: India
- Language: Tamil

Meen Kuzhambum Mann Paanaiyum (transl. Fish curry and Claypot) is a 2016 Indian Tamil language fantasy comedy film written and directed by Amudheshwar and co-produced by Dushyanth Ramkumar. The film stars Prabhu, Kalidas Jayaram, Ashna Zaveri and Pooja Kumar in the lead roles. It was promoted as Prabhu Ganesan’s 200th film. The principal photography of the film commenced in November 2015 in Chennai and the film was released exactly a year later. Kamal Haasan shot for a cameo appearance in the film. It also marked the feature film debut as an adult of Kalidas Jayaram, son of noted film actors Jayaram and Parvathy, who had appeared as a child artist during the early 2000s and also his official Tamil debut.

== Plot ==
Annamalai is a single parent to Karthik and owns an Indian restaurant in Malaysia. Annamalai is very fond of Karthik and loves to spend time with him, but Karthik is a fun-loving person who spends most of his time with friends and thinks that his father is too emotional. Karthik falls in love with his classmate Pavithra, daughter of an IFS officer who is separated from her husband. Meanwhile, Mala is a don who falls in love with Annamalai as she is impressed by his cooking skills.

Annamalai worries that Karthik always prioritizes his friends over him. One day, they meet a saint named Swami, who swaps both Annamalai and Karthik's souls to make them understand each other's love. Now Annamalai (in Karthik's body) goes to college, while Karthik (in Annamalai's body) takes care of the restaurant. Annamalai understands Karthik's love for Pavithra and gets close to her family. He also helps Pavithra's mother patch up with her husband in India. Similarly, Karthik understands the hardships faced by Annamalai in raising him from childhood following his mother's early demise and realizes his true love. Karthik also plans to have Mala marry Annamalai. There is also a don who happens to be Mala's boss and does not want her to marry Annamalai. The don kidnaps Pavithra and Mala. Following a comical fight, both are saved. Karthik apologizes to Annamalai for not understanding his love for him. Immediately, both souls are swapped. The movie ends with Karthik getting united with Pavithra, while Mala and Annamalai are also united.

== Cast ==
- Prabhu as Annamalai
- Kalidas Jayaram as Karthik
- Ashna Zaveri as Pavithra
- Pooja Kumar as Mala
- Urvashi as Pavithra's mother
- M. S. Bhaskar as Don
- Ilavarasu as Annamalai's friend
- Santhana Bharathi as Pavithra's grandfather
- Thalaivasal Vijay as Pavithra's father
- R. S. Shivaji as Professor
- Thalapathy Dinesh
- Balaji
- Kamal Haasan as Swami (guest appearance)
- Y. G. Mahendra in a guest appearance
- Sudha Mahendra in a guest appearance
- Ester Noronha in a special appearance in the "Waka Wowra" song

== Production ==
Dushyanth Ramkumar opted to set up a new production house, separate from his commitments for Sivaji Productions. Amudhesvar, who had previously worked as an associate to director Suseenthiran, was signed to direct the script. Production started in October 2015 and they started scouting for locations in Malaysia for the shoot for the film titled Meen Kuzhambum Mann Paanaiyum, starring Kalidas Jayaram, Ashna Zaveri and Prabhu. The film began production in Chennai during November 2015 and then held a second schedule in Malaysia during January 2016. Pooja Kumar joined the team during January 2016 and revealed that she would portray a female don based in Malaysia. Kamal Haasan later shot for a cameo appearance in the film during March 2016.

== Soundtrack ==
The soundtrack was composed by D. Imman.

Meen Kuzhambum Mann Paanaiyum

Soundtrack album by D. Imman
- Released: 2016
- Genre: Feature film soundtrack
- Length: 18:43
- Language: Tamil

D. Imman chronology
Rekka (2016)	Meen Kuzhambum Mann Paanaiyum (2016)	Maaveeran Kittu (2016)

All lyrics are written by Madhan Karky.

No.	Title	Artist(s)	Length
1.	"Wako Wowra"	Neha Bhasin, Varun Parandhaman	4:05
2.	"Athey Nila"	Sathya Prakash, Shashaa Tirupati, Elfe Choir	4:20
3.	"Hey Puthrajaya Poove"	Jithin Raj, Sunitha Sarathy	4:06
4.	"Yellam Nadagam Endrayo"	Shankar Mahadevan	4:07
5.	"Meenkuzhambum Manpanayum Theme"	D. Imman	2:05
Total length:			18:43

== Release ==
The Times of India gave the film a rating of two out of five stars and wrote that "With a not-so-bad story line, the director has tried his best to weave a fantasy story laced with humour". Other critics called the film "tedious".
