= Machi (film) =

- Poster
- Directed by: K. S. Vasantha Kumar
- Written by: K. S. Vasantha Kumar
- Produced by: S. K. Krishnakanth
- Starring: Dushyanth; Shubha Poonja
- Cinematography: R. Madhi
- Edited by: B. S. Vasu; Saleem
- Music by: A. R. Reihana
- Production company: Indian Theatre Production
- Release date: 25 June 2004
- Running time: 150 minutes
- Country: India
- Language: Tamil

Machi (transl. Dude) is a 2004 Indian Tamil-language action film written and directed by K. S. Vasantha Kumar. The film stars Dushyanth and Shubha Poonja, with Pasupathy, Bhanu Chander, Sulakshana, S. R. Prakash, Sathish, Ranjan and V. Sankar playing supporting roles. It was released on 25 June 2004.

== Plot ==
Karthik is a rich and spoiled brat from Mumbai who likes to spend time drinking alcohol and nightclubbing. His father Mohanram, tired of seeing his son drunk every night, forces him to enroll in a medical college in Coimbatore. In Coimbatore, far from changing his behaviour, Karthik rags the college students. Then, he meets four of his classmates: Pandi, Babu, Vasu and Moses who come from middle-class families. The four think that they are now friends with Karthik, but he makes sure that they are not friends. The haughty Karthik even makes fun of their looks and social status.

One night, the carefree Karthik, who was really drunk, is struck by a lorry. Covered with blood and lying on the road, Karthik asks for help, but no one would help him. One person even stole his gold chain and purse. Then, the four friends take him to the nearby hospital, pay the hospital fees for him, and take care of him until he recovers. Karthik then realises his mistakes. He changes his attitude, and the friends become close. In the meantime, Karthik falls in love with the bubbly Rakshita. Thereafter, Rakshita invites him and his friend to the restaurant. At the restaurant, the four friends get into a fight with Govind, who teased Karthik. The same night, Kathik's friends are kidnapped by Govind and beaten up, then Karthik comes to their rescue and saves them. During the fight, Govind's face is disfigured by acid.

Govind is none other than the only son of Narayanan, a politician. Narayanan, who was a beggar 25 years back, is now the most powerful politician of Coimbatore. He wants to become the Chief Minister of Tamil Nadu at any cost, and also wants people to respect him, praise him, or at least fear him. Enraged to see his son in this condition, Narayanan sends his henchmen to kill the five friends, but Karthik beats them up with ease. What transpires next forms the rest of the story.

== Cast ==
- Dushyanth as Karthik
- Shubha Poonja as Rakshita
- Pasupathy as Narayanan
- Bhanu Chander as Mohanram
- Sulakshana as Thangamani, Babu's mother
- S. R. Prakash as Pandi
- Sathish as Babu
- Ranjan as Vasu
- V. Sankar as Moses
- M. S. Bhaskar
- Cool Suresh as Govind, Narayanan's son
- Mohan Vaidya as Rakshita's father
- Baboos as Police Officer
- Pondy Ravi as Narayanan's henchman
- Anjali Devi as Narayanan's wife

== Production ==
Following the release of the film Success (2003), Dushyanth announced that his second film would be an action film and produced by S. K. Krishnakanth, who earlier produced films like King (2002), Thiruda Thirudi (2003) and Pudhukottaiyilirundhu Saravanan (2004). The film would directed by the debutant K. S. Vasantha Kumar who had worked under R. Madhesh, an associate of S. Shankar. R. Madhi was hired as cinematographer and A. R. Rahman's sister A. R. Reihana was introduced a music director.

Newcomer Shubha Poonja was signed to play the female lead, making her acting debut in Tamil cinema. Pasupathy, who came to limelight playing a negative character in Kamal Haasan's Virumaandi, signed to play the antagonist role. The rest of the cast includes Sulakshana, Anjali Devi and Bhanu Chander. The entire cast was provided formal training for 45 days rehearsing nearly all the scenes with full dialogue and costumes. For the first time, this method is being tried in Tamil cinema. The film was entirely shot in Coimbatore.

== Soundtrack ==
The music was composed by A. R. Reihana, with lyrics written by Kalaikumar, Kabilan and Annamalai. Malathi Rangarajan of The Hindu stated, "A. R. Rehana's music in Machi is only an aural intrusion".

Song	Singer(s)	Duration
"Gummango"	Gana Ulaganathan	3:06
"Gummango"	Shankar Mahadevan	3:05
"Holiday"	Devan Ekambaram, Bony	3:42
"Maname"	Hariharan	2:44
"Poda Poda"	Krishnaraj, Shamsuddin, Srividya, A. R. Reihana	3:39
"Thakka Thakka"	Palakkad Sreeram	2:07
"Thodu Thodu"	Sujatha Mohan	3:30

== Critical reception ==
Malathi Rangarajan of The Hindu wrote, "Racy, thrilling and suspenseful for the most part, Machi, despite certain snags, comes as a surprise". Visual Dasan of Kalki praised Vasanthakumar for making a film with fast-paced screenplay and realistic scenes but criticised dragged second half, Pasupathy's acting and Reihana's music. GU of Deccan Herald wrote "Machchi is all about friendship and sacrifice, a little heavy subject for a new hero. But Dushyanth lives upto the director’s expectations and proves that he is a young hero with a tremendous potential". Sify wrote, "Debutant director Vasantha Kumar has tried to make a racy film with all the commercial mix. [..] On the whole Machi is entertaining and has a message on friendship".
