= My Dear Marthandan =

1990 film by Pratap Pothen

- Poster
- Directed by: Pratap Pothen
- Screenplay by: Pratap Pothen
- Story by: G. M. Kumar
- Produced by: Santhi Narayanasamy; C. T. Manohar
- Starring: Prabhu; Khushbu
- Cinematography: Ashok Kumar
- Edited by: B. Lenin; V. T. Vijayan
- Music by: Ilaiyaraaja
- Production company: Sivaji Productions
- Release date: 24 August 1990
- Running time: 114 minutes
- Country: India
- Language: Tamil

My Dear Marthandan is a 1990 Indian Tamil-language film directed by Pratap Pothen and produced by Sivaji Productions, starring Prabhu and Khushbu. It is loosely based on the 1988 American film Coming to America. The film was released on 24 August 1990.

== Plot ==
Marthandan lives with his parents in a palace. He sets out to Chennai to find a girl. There he meets "Idea Mani", who is very cunning and tries to make money from the innocent Marthandan in comical ways. He meets a girl named Rani in a bakery and befriends her. The rest of the story is about how he tries to win her over and how he understands the value of money.

== Cast ==
- Prabhu as Marthandan
- Khushbu as Rani
- Goundamani as Idea Mani
- S. S. Chandran as Maharaja
- Nizhalgal Ravi as Pankaj
- Kovai Sarala as Maharani
- Vennira Aadai Moorthy as Hotel Owner
- Thyagu as Kattupanni
- Pandu as Umapathy
- Kumarimuthu as Teacher
- Kullamani
- Chinni Jayanth
- R. S. Shivaji as Sengodan
- Oru Viral Krishna Rao
- Disco Shanti
- Ponnambalam
- Subbu Panchu Arunachalam as the man who teases Rani (uncredited)
- Ramkumar Ganesan (Guest appearance)

== Production ==
According to Khushbu, the film's climax was shot at Sholinganallur, Madras.

== Soundtrack ==
The soundtrack was composed by Ilaiyaraaja.

Track listing
No.	Title	Lyrics	Singer(s)	Length
1.	"Oh Alagu Nilavu"	Piraisoodan	Mano
2.	"Aaduthu Paar"	Gangai Amaran	Ilaiyaraaja
3.	"Ilavattam Kai Thattum"	Vaali	S. P. Balasubrahmanyam, S. Janaki
4.	"Kalyana Mapillaikku"	Gangai Amaran	S. P. Sailaja
5.	"My Dear Marthandan"	Gangai Amaran	Ilaiyaraaja
6.	"Oh Maharaja"	Gangai Amaran	Sasi Rekha
7.	"Paakku Vethala"	Vaali	S. P. Balasubrahmanyam
8.	"Satham Varamal"	Vaali	Mano, K. S. Chithra
9.	"Uttalakadi"	Gangai Amaran	Gangai Amaran, S. P. Balasubrahmanyam

== Release and reception ==
My Dear Marthandan was released on 24 August 1990. N. Krishnaswamy of The Indian Express wrote, "It has some idealism (message: money cannot buy happiness), it has comical situations abounding and as it is, it is clean, it has engaging music and songs (Ilayaraja) and dance, and it is photographed with an artistry and creativity that only an Ashok Kumar is capable of. It is a technically perfect film that way". Ravi, writing for Kalki, said the film's plus points were the cinematography and music.
