= Dushyanth Ramkumar =

Indian actor and film producer

- Born: 1 January 1983 (age 43); Chennai, Tamil Nadu, India
- Other name: Junior Sivaji
- Occupations: Actor, film producer
- Years active: 2003–present
- Spouse: Abiramidevi (m. 2011)
- Children: 2
- Parent: Ramkumar Ganesan (father)
- Relatives: Sivaji Ganesan (grandfather); Prabhu (uncle); Vikram Prabhu (cousin)

Dushyanth Ramkumar (born 1 January 1983) is an Indian actor and film producer working in Tamil language films, who made his debut in Success (2003). After appearing in a couple of films, he has worked as an executive producer for Sivaji Productions. He is the son of Ramkumar Ganesan and grandson of the actor Sivaji Ganesan. He is now acting in South Indian Tamil TV soaps such as Devathai, of for which he is one of the producers.

== Career ==
Producer Issaki Sundar saw Dushyanth at the Sivaji Productions office and offered him the opportunity to make his acting debut. After initially rejecting the offer, he ultimately agreed after consulting with his uncle Prabhu and cousin Vikram Prabhu. Dushyanth was also credited as Junior Sivaji during the production of the film. The film was named Success, after the first on-screen dialogue of Sivaji from the film Parasakthi (1952). The film opened to mixed reviews, with a critic noting: "the movie surprises us with a nice turn of events. It definitely energizes the movie and gets us interested again. Looking back on the first half after this, we realize that the movie has actually been quite clever in setting up stock characters, but in a slightly different way that makes the twist surprising." Another reviewer noted: "To sum up, Success is not the right film for Jr. Ganesan to be successful." His second film was Machi (2004), with a reviewer noting: "Dushyanth as the ‘hero' has improved leaps and bounds from Success, in dialogue delivery and expressions." He has since not been seen in films as an actor.

He worked extensively on the sets of Sivaji Productions' Aasal as a producer alongside Vikram Prabhu. In 2015, he set up Eshan Productions and began his first film Meen Kuzhambum Mann Paanaiyum (2016).

In May 2022, Dushyanth announced plans of making an acting comeback, and signed on to appear in a film titled Shooting Star by M. J. Ramanan.

== Personal life ==
He is the son of actor-producer Ramkumar Ganesan and grandson of Sivaji Ganesan. His uncle Prabhu and cousin Vikram Prabhu are leading actors in Tamil films. He married Abirami in a ceremony in November 2011. He has three brothers Shivakumar, Dharshan and Rishyan.

== Filmography ==
Year	Film	Role	Notes
2003	Success	Ganesh	
2004	Machi	Karthik	
2016	Meen Kuzhambum Mann Paanaiyum	—N/a	As producer
2023	Theerkadarishi	Vikram	
