= Puthiya Paravai =

1964 film directed by Dada Mirasi

- Theatrical release poster
- Directed by: Dada Mirasi
- Screenplay by: Nannu; Aaroor Dass (dialogues)
- Based on: Sesh Anka by Rajkumar Mitra
- Produced by: Sivaji Ganesan
- Starring: Sivaji Ganesan; B. Saroja Devi; M. R. Radha; Sowcar Janaki
- Cinematography: K. S. Prasad
- Edited by: N. M. Shankar
- Music by: Viswanathan–Ramamoorthy
- Production company: Sivaji Films
- Distributed by: Sivaji Films
- Release date: 12 September 1964
- Running time: 151 minutes
- Country: India
- Language: Tamil

Puthiya Paravai (transl. New Bird) is a 1964 Indian Tamil-language romantic thriller film directed by Dada Mirasi. Produced by Sivaji Ganesan, the film stars himself, B. Saroja Devi, M. R. Radha and Sowcar Janaki, with Nagesh, Manorama, V. K. Ramasamy, O. A. K. Thevar and S. V. Ramadas in supporting roles. The plot revolves around Gopal, who falls in love with Latha, when his previously presumed-dead wife Chitra arrives. He claims her to be an impostor but no one believes him.

Puthiya Paravai is the maiden Tamil production of Sivaji Films, later renamed Sivaji Productions, and the company's third overall production after the Hindi films Amardeep (1958) and Rakhi (1962). It is a remake of the Bengali film Sesh Anka (1963) which is itself inspired by the British film Chase a Crooked Shadow (1958). The screenplay was written by Nannu, and the dialogues by Aaroor Dass. Cinematography was handled by K. S. Prasad and editing by N. M. Shankar. The soundtrack album and background score were composed by the duo Viswanathan–Ramamoorthy while the lyrics were written by Kannadasan.

Puthiya Paravai was released on 12 September 1964. The film received positive reviews; critics praised its style, music, and the performances of Ganesan and Janaki, but criticised the comic subplot featuring Nagesh and Manorama. It was also a commercial success, with a theatrical run of over 100 days. Puthiya Paravai was re-released on 23 July 2010 at Ganesan's family-owned Shanti Theatre, and was again met with positive response and commercial success.

== Plot ==
Gopal is a rich businessman en route to India from Singapore on a cruise ship. He meets Latha, another traveller who has been accompanied by her father Ramadurai. Gopal and Latha find that they like each other, so Gopal invites them to stay at his mansion in Ooty, which they accept. One day, Latha discovers that Gopal becomes agitated whenever he sees an onrushing train and demands to know why. He explains that the reason behind this is his first wife.

Gopal recalls that, after losing his mother, in sorrow he had been wandering aimlessly in Singapore. He fell in love with Chitra, a nightclub singer, and they married in the presence of her brother Raju. But to Gopal's dismay, Chitra always came home inebriated, and despite his repeated requests, had little respect for tradition and family values. When Chitra showed up drunk for Gopal's birthday party, he tried to control her, but she refused to co-operate; Gopal's father died of a heart attack after seeing Chitra's behaviour. Irritated by Gopal, Chitra later tried to leave him; he caught up and begged her to change her decision, but Chitra berated him for controlling her, and he slapped her. Later that night, he heard that Chitra committed suicide on a railway track, and this hurts him a lot. Latha sympathises with Gopal and accepts his love.

The engagement of Gopal and Latha is fixed. While the reception is being held at Gopal's mansion, a woman claiming to be Chitra arrives, accompanied by her uncle Rangan. Gopal's engagement with Latha is cancelled after Rangan convinces everyone that the woman is indeed Chitra. Gopal says she is an impostor and shows Chitra's death certificate as proof, but Rangan reads in the certificate that though the corpse was disfigured beyond recognition, Gopal insisted that it was Chitra so it was declared to be her. Rangan's actions convince Gopal's police officer friend Kumar, although Gopal is adamant that his wife is dead. "Chitra" and Rangan become disruptive and Gopal gets frustrated, fearing that Latha might leave him because his "wife" has turned up.

After many failed attempts to expose the impostor, Gopal reveals the truth to everyone: when he slapped Chitra, not knowing she was suffering from a heart condition, she died immediately. Gopal realised that he had inadvertently killed his wife. To avoid arrest, and safeguard the honour of his family, he manipulated the murder to appear like a suicide on a railway track and fabricated the necessary evidence to show that Chitra committed suicide.

With everyone believing his story, Gopal orders Kumar to arrest the Chitra impostor. However, Latha reveals herself as a police officer investigating Chitra's death based on the complaint filed by Raju, who suspected she could not have committed suicide. Ramadurai is Latha's senior posing as her father, Rangan is the local investigating officer, and the Chitra impostor is Rangan's aide, Sarasa. Together, they staged an entrapment to get the killer's confession because there was no clinching evidence. Latha confesses to a dejected Gopal that though she initially pretended to love him, his good nature impressed her and she truly loves him; she promises that she will wait for him till he returns after completing his jail term. Gopal is relieved, but is still arrested.

== Cast ==
- Sivaji Ganesan as Gopal
- B. Saroja Devi as Latha
- M. R. Radha as Rangan
- Sowcar Janaki as Chitra and Sarasa
- Nagesh as Sanjeevi
- Manorama as Alli
- V. K. Ramasamy as Ramadurai
- O. A. K. Thevar as Kumar
- S. V. Ramadas as Raju
- Dada Mirasi as Gopal's father (uncredited)

== Production ==
=== Development ===
The 1958 British thriller film Chase a Crooked Shadow, directed by Michael Anderson, was a global success, especially in India. It inspired the Bengali film Sesh Anka (1963) whose screenplay was written by Rajkumar Mitra. The screenplay was acquired by Sivaji Ganesan's company Sivaji Films (later renamed Sivaji Productions) to be remade in Tamil. In mid-April 1963, Sivaji Films announced the remake, titled Puthiya Paravai, with Dada Mirasi as its director. While the screenplay was written by Nannu who also worked as associate director, Shanmugham, a relative of Ganesan, also made inputs to the screenplay, and Aaroor Dass wrote the dialogues. The script was written to be substantially different from the original, with regards to the portrayal of romance between the lead characters. Puthiya Paravai was the third production for Sivaji Films after the Hindi films Amardeep (1958) and Rakhi (1962). K. S. Prasad, N. M. Shankar, and Ganga were hired as the cinematographer, editor and art director respectively.

=== Casting ===
Any role that is unusual, unconventional has a special appeal for me, a character like the one I played in Puthiya Paravai. Maybe it has something to do with my own psyche. I love complex characters.

— Sowcar Janaki, in a 1972 interview with Film World

While Sivaji Ganesan played the male lead Gopal, B. Saroja Devi was cast as Gopal's love interest Latha at Shanmugham's suggestion. According to Ganesan's eldest son Ramkumar, Ganesan "always thought of Sowcar Janaki as classy and sophisticated," which was why he cast her as a "modern woman" in Puthiya Paravai. "Before that Sowcar had only acted in homely roles". Janaki was "exasperated" after acting in so many "glycerine-laced tales", and readily accepted to act in Puthiya Paravai when approached by Ganesan. Janaki portrayed Gopal's wife Chitra and her decoy Sarasa.

Mirasi, who made a cameo appearance as Gopal's father, initially objected to Ganesan's desire to cast Janaki because he felt the actress, then known mainly for sentimental roles, would not fit the stylish character of Chitra. But Ganesan remained adamant as he felt Janaki was perfect as Chitra and was supported by Aaroor Dass, so Mirasi half-heartedly agreed. After seeing Janaki's performance in the song "Paartha Gnaabagam Illaiyo", he began to appreciate her. Janaki added her own subtle distinctions and inputs to her role as portraying an out-and-out seductive vamp, according to her, would have felt deplorable.

=== Filming ===
Principal photography for Puthiya Paravai took place at Neptune Studios and Vijaya Vauhini Studios, though filming also took place at Ooty. It was filmed in Eastmancolor. The majority of costumes were tailored and brought from Singapore and England. On the first day of shooting, Janaki did not like the dress tailored for her, and instead opted for a black sari she bought in Hong Kong a few months earlier. This was the dress she wore during the filming of "Paartha Gnaabagam Illaiyo" after it was given some embroidery. The tuxedo worn by Ganesan in the film was ordered from London. For the filming of the song "Unnai Ondru Ketpen", he smoked so as to set the mood for the song's feel. As Gopal, he did not actually play the piano onscreen, and only gave the impression that he was doing so. For some scenes in the film, Saroja Devi was made to walk with mincing steps and flutter her eyelashes.

After the climax was finished, Aaroor Doss immediately requested Ganesan and Mirasi to do the sequence again with the addition of the dialogue "Pennmaye! Nee Vaazhga! Ullame Unakku Oru Nanri" (transl. Oh lady! May you live long! A note of thanks to your heart). When Ganesan asked the reason for including it, Aaroor Dass mentioned that Gopal would be looked upon by the theatre audiences in a negative light if he did not say anything to confirm his love for Latha. Understanding the dialogue's essence, Mirasi then re-filmed the climax and included it. The film was processed at Gemini Color Laboratory. The final length of the film was over 4,400 metres (14,400 ft). (Note: While the film's official length given by its CBFC certificate is 4,473 metres (14,675 ft), film historian Film News Anandan's 2004 book Saadhanaigal Padaitha Thamizh Thiraipada Varalaru measures it at 4,486 metres (14,718 ft).)

== Themes ==
In her 2002 book Cinema of Interruptions: Action Genres in Contemporary Indian Cinema, Lalitha Gopalan noted that the male protagonists in Indian films use the piano to express their desire with no regard to the consequences and cited Sivaji Ganesan in Puthiya Paravai as an example for the same. According to The Hindu's Sudhir Srinivasan, the film being titled Puthiya Paravai (transl. New Bird) reflects "Tamil cinema's fascination for fauna when it comes to titles".

== Music ==
The film's music was composed by Viswanathan–Ramamoorthy (a duo consisting of M. S. Viswanathan and T. K. Ramamoorthy) while the lyrics were written by Kannadasan; T. M. Soundararajan and P. Susheela are the only singers featured in the soundtrack. The first song recorded was "Chittu Kuruvi". "Paartha Gnaabagam Illaiyo" is inspired by Dean Martin's version of "Sway". The song includes tango and bossa nova style music. Philips, an autodidact guitarist, played the guitar for "Aha Mella". "Unnai Ondru Ketpen" has a ragtime piano introduction while its interlude includes saxophone music. Viswanathan played the piano off-screen for the song. It is set in Harikambhoji, a Carnatic raga.

The heavily orchestrated "Engey Nimmadhi", at that time, had the highest number of instruments used for recording. Choir singers from the Purasawalkam and Vepery areas of Madras (now Chennai) were used in the song. According to film historian Mohan Raman, "Kannadasan could not get the right words nor was there a tune ready and Sivaji came to the composing and did a pantomime of what he would like to do and thus was born the line and the song". Cellist R. Selvaraj, whose father was a part of the orchestration for "Engey Nimmadhi" said 250 instrumentalists were used for playing different instruments in sync. Other sources state that Viswanathan used over 300 instruments for the song. Instruments used included the harp, violins, cello, bass, vibraphone, bongos, kettle drums, flutes, castanets, trumpets, tuba, trombone, clarinet and mandolin.

Viswanathan–Ramamoorthy tried over 100 different ways of composing the tune of "Engey Nimmadhi" before the song was recorded. It is set in Bilaskhani Todi, a Hindustani raga. S. S. Vasan of Hindu Tamil Thisai compared the sombre moments in the song to that of "Mujhko Is Raat Ki Tanhai Me" from Dil Bhi Tera Hum Bhi Tere (1960). Music composer and singer Ramesh Vinayakam said "Engey Nimmadhi" was an example of "the unconscious yet natural and healthy fusion that was happening to cinema music at the hands of music directors."

"Paartha Gnaabagam Illaiyo" was later sampled in "Yae Dushyanta", composed by Bharadwaj for Aasal (2010). Singer Karthik performed "Aha Mella" live at "Two to Tango", an October 2016 concert organised by the Rotary Club of Madras South. The soundtrack received positive response from critics; all the songs were successful, especially "Engey Nimmadhi". The songs were featured in a charity concert held by M. S. Viswanathan at the Kamaraj Arangam in Chennai on 14 July 2012. Susheela has named "Paartha Gnaabagam Illaiyo" and "Unnai Ondru Ketpen" as among her favourite songs that she had recorded. "Paartha Nyabagam Illayo" was recreated in Kolai (2023).

Track listing
No.	Title	Singer(s)	Length
1.	"Engey Nimmadhi"	T. M. Soundararajan	6:21
2.	"Chittu Kuruvi"	P. Susheela	5:08
3.	"Aha Mella"	T. M. Soundararajan	4:12
4.	"Unnai Ondru Ketpen"	P. Susheela	3:02
5.	"Paartha Gnaabagam Illaiyo"	P. Susheela	3:38
6.	"Paartha Gnaabagam Illaiyo" (melancholic)	P. Susheela	4:00
7.	"Unnai Ondru Ketpen" (adagio)	P. Susheela	2:10
Total length:			28:31

== Release ==
Puthiya Paravai was released on 12 September 1964, and was distributed by Sivaji Films themselves. It was originally slated to be released in Shanti Theatre, owned by Ganesan and his family. However, the Hindi film Sangam was already running there successfully, and its lead actor Raj Kapoor requested Ganesan to allow his film to continue running at Shanti since "no other theatre in the city had such facilities". Ganesan obliged, and instead released Puthiya Paravai in the now non-existent Paragon Theatre, which underwent refurbishment for two weeks before the film's screening. Puthiya Paravai was later dubbed in Telugu as Singapore CID.

=== Box office ===
Puthiya Paravai did not open well as audiences were unwilling to accept Gopal killing his wife and Latha deceiving him. However, after this the film's reception improved; initially released at only 60 theatres, this was later increased to 100. It had a theatrical run of 132 days at Paragon, 76 days at the theatres Krishna and Sayani, and for eight weeks in all major centres in Madras. Due to its successful run at Paragon, Aandavan Kattalai (1964), which was also running at the same theatre, had to be removed after completing 70 days.

=== Critical reception ===
Puthiya Paravai received mainly positive reviews upon release. In a review published on the day of its release, the critic from The Indian Express wrote about the film's central mystery, "[W]hen it is revealed after seven songs[,] a lot of love-play and familiar kitchen comedy, it loses its suspense and does not amount to much." The critic praised the performances of Ganesan and the supporting cast but criticised the comic subplot featuring Nagesh, the dialogue, lyrics, songs and make-up, and concluded, "The photographer and the art director seem to have a weakness for the colour red, but otherwise have done a good job." On 1 October, Dinakaran, writing for the magazine Mutharam, found the film to be truly Hitchcockian. He praised the performances of Ganesan and Janaki, noting that the former pulls it off with effortless ease. He however, criticised Nagesh and Manorama's comedy, finding it dry.

On 4 October, Shekar and Sundar of the magazine Ananda Vikatan jointly reviewed the film. Sundar appreciated the cast performances, Mirasi's direction, the photography and the colour, and Shekar was particularly appreciative of Ganesan and Janaki's performances, the night scenes and the set designs, but mildly critical of Nagesh's comedy. Sundar concluded that the film could be accepted intellectually, but found it emotionally tough to accept due to the climax. Writing for Sport and Pastime in a review dated 10 October, T. M. Ramachandran praised the performances of Ganesan as Gopal and Janaki as both Chitra and her decoy, but said there was "nothing much to write" about Saroja Devi. He said the film's pre-interval portions were generic, but "the story begins to grip only after the interval" and applauded the twist ending as "thought-provoking". Ramachandran added that Nagesh "fails to provoke laughter with his antics", but concluded his review by appreciating the colour processing by Gemini.

== Re-releases ==
Footage from Puthiya Paravai was screened at Ganesan's 80th birthday celebrations held at Kalaignar Arangam, Chennai in 2008. The film was re-released on 23 July 2010 to commemorate the ninth anniversary of Ganesan's death. The negatives of the film were "cleaned up at a lab" prior to release, and the film was released at Shanthi Theatre, where it could not originally be released in 1964. It earned public acclaim and had a strong opening, running to one-hundred percent theatre occupancy for three days, and became a commercial success. The film was screened at the Russian Cultural Centre Auditorium in Alwarpet on 14 September 2014.

== In popular culture ==
Puthiya Paravai is frequently screened on Tamil television channels, most notably Jaya TV. Many scenes from the film, especially those involving Sivaji Ganesan and Saroja Devi were parodied many times. One notable parody is the comedy track from Guru En Aalu (2009), which featured Vivek and M. S. Bhaskar, who imitate Latha and Gopal respectively. The parody became popular and was frequently screened on comedy channels like Adithya TV and Sirippoli. In Thenali (2000), Kailash (Jayaram) watches "Chittu Kuruvi" on television but changes the channel after imagining that Gopal's face morphs into that of Thenali (Kamal Haasan). In Siruthai (2011), Kaatu Poochi (Santhanam) watches the film's climax on television before stealing the television set. Scenes from Puthiya Paravai are featured in the film Burma (2014). In the third season of the television show Super Singer, the show's host Dhivyadharshini and singer Mano imitate Latha and Gopal's mannerisms. Saroja Devi's pronunciation of the name "Gopal" also attained popularity, and was imitated by Vijayalakshmi (Jyothika) in Kaatrin Mozhi (2018). Sridhar who was present during the story narration alongside V. C. Shanmugam and Sivaji Ganesan was impressed with the way Dada Mirasi narrated the plot and decided to incorporate this as comedy scene in his directorial Kadhalikka Neramillai (1964) where Nagesh narrates a horror story to T. S. Balaiah.

== Sources ==
- Cooke, Mervyn; Ford, Fiona (2016). The Cambridge Companion to Film Music. Cambridge University Press. ISBN 978-1-107-47649-3.
- Gopalan, Lalitha (2002). Cinema of Interruptions: Action Genres in Contemporary Indian Cinema. British Film Institute. ISBN 978-0-85170-923-9.
- Mishra, D. P. (2006). Great masters of Indian cinema: the Dadasaheb Phalke Award winners. Ministry of Information and Broadcasting. ISBN 978-81-230-1361-9.
- Sundararaman (2007) [2005]. Raga Chintamani: A Guide to Carnatic Ragas Through Tamil Film Music (2nd ed.). Chennai: Pichhamal Chintamani. OCLC 295034757.
