= Chandramukhi =

2005 Indian film by P. Vasu

- Theatrical release poster
- Directed by: P. Vasu
- Screenplay by: P. Vasu
- Story by: Madhu Muttam (uncredited)
- Produced by: Ramkumar Ganesan; Prabhu
- Starring: Rajinikanth; Prabhu; Jyothika
- Cinematography: Sekhar V. Joseph
- Edited by: Suresh Urs
- Music by: Vidyasagar
- Production company: Sivaji Productions
- Release date: 14 April 2005
- Country: India
- Language: Tamil
- Budget: ₹19 crore
- Box office: est. ₹60–90 crore

Chandramukhi (transl. Moon-faced lady) is a 2005 Indian Tamil-language comedy horror film written and directed by P. Vasu. It is a remake of Vasu's Kannada film Apthamitra (2004) which itself was based on the Malayalam film Manichitrathazhu (1993). The film stars Rajinikanth, Prabhu and Jyothika (who played the titular role) in the leads, along with an ensemble supporting cast, including Vadivelu, Nayanthara, Nassar and Sheela. It revolves around a woman who has dissociative identity disorder that affects a family, and a psychiatrist who intends to solve the case while risking his life.

Chandramukhi was produced by Prabhu and his brother Ramkumar Ganesan through their company Sivaji Productions, and is the company's 50th film. The soundtrack album and background score were composed by Vidyasagar. Cinematography was handled by Sekhar V. Joseph and editing was done by Suresh Urs. Principal photography began on 24 October 2004 and was completed in March 2005.

Chandramukhi was released on 14 April 2005 on the eve of the Tamil New Year. The film became a major box office success, the highest grossing Tamil film of the year with a theatrical run of 890 days at Shanti Theatre. The film won five Tamil Nadu State Film Awards, four Film Fans' Association Awards and two Filmfare Awards. Jyothika and Vadivelu were each awarded a Kalaimamani Award for their work on the film. A sequel Chandramukhi 2 was released in 2023.

== Plot ==
Dr. Saravanan, a psychiatrist, visits India while on vacation. He meets up with his foster brother Senthilnathan, alias Senthil, and his wife Ganga. Senthil's mother Kasthuri wanted him to marry Priya, the daughter of his father's cousin Kandaswamy, to reunite the two branches of the family after 30 years of separation; this is because Senthil's father chose to marry Kasthuri instead of Akhilandeshwari, Kandaswamy's sister. When Saravanan learns that Senthil has bought the Vettaiyapuram mansion, despite attempts by the local village elders to dissuade him, he decides to also move into the mansion. Akhilandeshwari is jealous of Saravanan and plots to kill him with the help of her assistant Oomaiyan.

When the family visits a temple, the chief priest reveals the reason everyone fears the Vettaiyapuram mansion. Some 150 years earlier, a king named Vettaiyan travelled to Vizianagaram in Andhra Pradesh, where he met and lusted after a dancer named Chandramukhi. However, she did not reciprocate his feelings as she was already in love with a dancer named Gunashekaran. As a result, Vettaiyan took her back to his palace by force. Unknown to him, Chandramukhi made Gunashekaran stay in a house nearby and met with him in secret. When Vettaiyan discovered this, he beheaded Gunashekaran on Durgashtami and burnt Chandramukhi alive. Chandramukhi's ghost has haunted the southwest room of the palace ever since, in order to take revenge on the king. Later, the marriage between Priya and Vishwanathan, a dance professor, is supported by Saravanan; he then asks Kandaswamy to arrange their marriage.

After hearing Chandramukhi's story, Ganga thinks that the story was fabricated to scare thieves from stealing treasures in the room, and decides to go there. Saravanan receives an email to attend a patient and assures Senthil to call him if anything happens before leaving. Ganga gets the room key from the gardener's granddaughter, Durga, and opens the door. Subsequently, strange things begin to happen in the household; a ghost frightens the people in the house, things inexplicably break, and Ganga's saree catches fire. Suspicion turns towards Durga. Senthil calls Saravanan to solve the case. As soon as Saravanan returns, a mysterious being tries to kill Priya. Attempts to kill Senthil are made with poison and by pushing a fish tank. A mysterious voice sings during the night. Saravanan investigates these incidents.

Ganga mysteriously disappears during Priya and Viswanathan's wedding reception. Saravanan notices her absence and searches for her, but he is almost killed by Oomaiyan, who has been sent by Akhilandeshwari. Saravanan subdues Oomaiyan and, with Senthil's help, finds Ganga, who is supposedly being aggressively harassed by Viswanathan. Saravanan reveals to Senthil and Viswanathan that Ganga has Dissociative Identity Disorder. He details how she became affected by it and how she took up Chandramukhi's identity. He tells them Ganga tried to kill Priya and Senthil, and to frame Viswanathan for harassment because, from Chandramukhi's view, Viswanathan is her lover Gunashekaran, since he stays in the same house as Gunashekaran did. The only way to stop this from happening is to make Ganga believe Saravanan is dead. This is because Saravanan acted like Vettaiyan and disrupted one of the pujas conducted by the exorcist Ramachandra Acharya by conversing with the ghost to know its wish.

Akhilandeshwari overhears Saravanan's idea of self-sacrifice and apologises to him. Later, in the dance hall, the family witnesses Ganga completely dressed up as Chandramukhi, with disheveled hair and a maniacally spooky gaze. Saravanan uses Viswanathan as Gunashekaran to lure Chandramukhi into the exorcism place and Ramachandra Acharya gives Chandramukhi a burning torch and allows her to burn Saravanan alive. Just before the fire can reach Saravanan, Ramachandra Acharya blows smoke and ash on Ganga's face, temporarily blinding her. Senthil then opens a trapdoor to let Saravanan escape, and an duplicate of Vettaiyan gets burnt instead. Convinced that Vettaiyan is dead, Chandramukhi leaves Ganga's body, curing her. The two families are reunited after 30 years. Saravanan and Durga fall in love, and Swarna and Murugesan become parents after eight years of marriage.

== Cast ==
- Rajinikanth in dual roles as:
  - Dr. Saravanan
  - Vettaiyan Raja
- Jyothika in dual roles as:
  - Ganga
  - Chandramukhi
- Prabhu as Senthilnathan
- Vadivelu as Murugesan
- Nayanthara as Durga
- Nassar as Kandaswamy
- Vineeth in dual roles as:
  - Viswanathan
  - Gunasekaran
- Vijayakumar as Durga's grandfather
- Sheela as Akhilandeswari
- K. R. Vijaya as Kasthuri
- Avinash as Ramachandra Acharyar
- Thyagu as Kumar
- Manobala as a fake exorcist
- Mohan Raj as Nair
- Sonu Sood as Oomaiyan
- Madhan Bob as a car owner
- T. P. Gajendran as Senthilnathan's assistant
- Malavika as Priya Viswanathan
- Vinaya Prasad as Laxmi Kandaswamy
- Suvarna Mathew as Suvarna Murugesan
- Sujibala as Kandaswamy's youngest daughter
- Unnikrishnan Namboothiri as the temple priest
- Periya Karuppu Thevar as a locksmith
- Siva Narayana Murthy as the Eloor panchayat head
- Pondy Ravi as a Ganesh Constructions worker
- Praharshitha as Bommi
- Sudha as Ganga's mother (uncredited; cameo appearance)
- Sivaji Ganesan as Senthilnathan's father (uncredited, only shown in photo)

Director P. Vasu, producer Ramkumar Ganesan and Rajinikanth's friend Raj Bahaddur make guest appearances in the song "Devuda Devuda".

== Production ==
=== Development ===
Four weeks ago, [Rajinikanth] called me on a Sunday afternoon, and asked what I was doing. I told him I had had [sic] a lot of biryani and was spending time with my sons! He laughed in his stylish way, and then asked if I was doing any new production. I told him we are thinking of doing a Hindi film with Rajkumar Santoshi in March. [...] I was quite free at the time. That's when he asked me, 'Shall we do a film, Ramu?' It came as a pleasant surprise. On a Sunday afternoon, after a heavy lunch, this suggestion from Rajnikanth was like superb dessert! I said, 'I am very happy sir.' He told me he had heard a subject, and we would make a film on that.

— Ramkumar Ganesan in October 2004

During a success meet for Mannan (1992), Rajinikanth announced that he would act in Sivaji Productions' 50th film, which would eventually become Chandramukhi. In September 2004, Rajinikanth congratulated P. Vasu on the success of his Kannada film Apthamitra (2004) and was impressed with the film's screenplay. Vasu then requested to remake the film in Tamil with Rajinikanth, who in turn, called Ramkumar Ganesan and asked him to produce it under Ramkumar's banner, Sivaji Productions.

Ramkumar telephoned Vasu, who was offering worship in a temple in Guruvayur at that time, informing him of Rajinikanth's wish to do Apthamitra in Tamil under his direction. Vasu reworked the script he wrote for Apthamitra to suit Rajinikanth's style of acting. The film dealt mainly with the concept of dissociative identity disorder, commonly known as "multiple personality disorder" (MPD) or "split personality disorder". Another film titled Anniyan (2005), which was released two months after Chandramukhi, was also based on the same disorder.

Thota Tharani was the film's art director, and also designed the costumes. Regarding the designing of the Vettaiyapuram palace, he watched both Apthamitra and its source Malayalam film Manichitrathazhu (1993) to get the basic idea of the film's plot. Vasu wanted Tharani to make the sets more colourful and grand and did not want the realistic look of the original film. Tharani designed Chandramukhi's room and placed a corridor in it, which was noticeably different from the original and its Kannada remake. The corridor resembled those commonly seen in palaces in Kerala. Sidney Sladen did additional costume designing in the film.

=== Casting ===
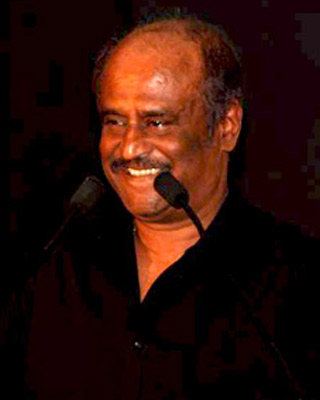
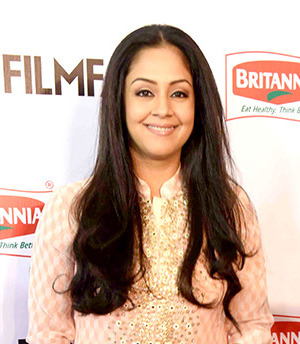
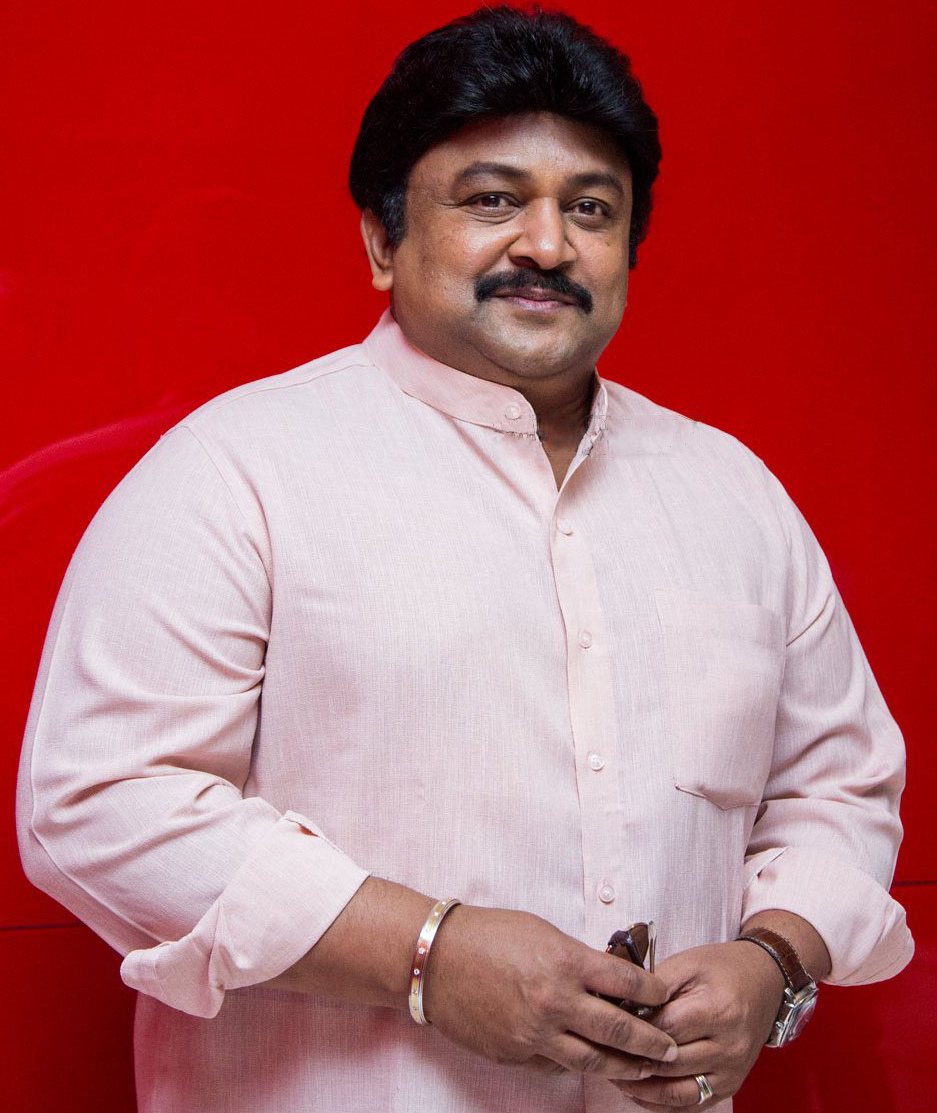
The film's primary cast — Rajinikanth, Jyothika and Prabhu

Rajinikanth played the roles of Dr. Saravanan and King Vettaiyan. He sported a wig for his role. Both Rajinikanth and Vasu discussed every scene featuring the former and added necessary inputs before they were shot. Rajinikanth appears in the beginning of the film unlike Manichitrathazhu, where the same character, played by Mohanlal, appears in the middle of the film. Ramkumar's brother Prabhu played Senthilnathan, a civil engineer and owner of the fictional Ganesh Constructions. Prabhu co-produced the film with Ramkumar.

For the roles of Ganga and Chandramukhi, Simran was initially cast. She ultimately refused to do the project, as her role required a lot of dancing and cited her pregnancy at that time as another reason for her refusal. Aishwarya Rai was later offered the role but declined. Sadha and Reema Sen were also considered as replacements. The role finally went to Jyothika, who allotted 50 days of her schedule. Vasu wanted her to perform her scenes in a manner different from that of Shobana in Manichitrathazhu, enacting the scenes himself before they were shot featuring Jyothika. Nayanthara was selected to portray the role of Durga after Vasu was impressed with her performance in the Malayalam film Manassinakkare (2003).

Vadivelu portrayed the comic role of Murugesan. Rajinikanth, at the film's 200th day theatrical run celebration function, said that it was he who recommended Vadivelu to Vasu for the role and had asked Ramkumar to get Vadivelu's dates before planning the filming schedules. Sheela played Akhilandeswari, the intimidating older sister of Kandaswamy (Nassar) and Murugesan. When Sheela was signed on for the role, she was requested by the producers not to divulge details about her role to the media. Avinash reprised his role of the exorcist Ramachandra Acharya who talks with the spirit Chandramukhi from Apthamitra.

=== Filming ===
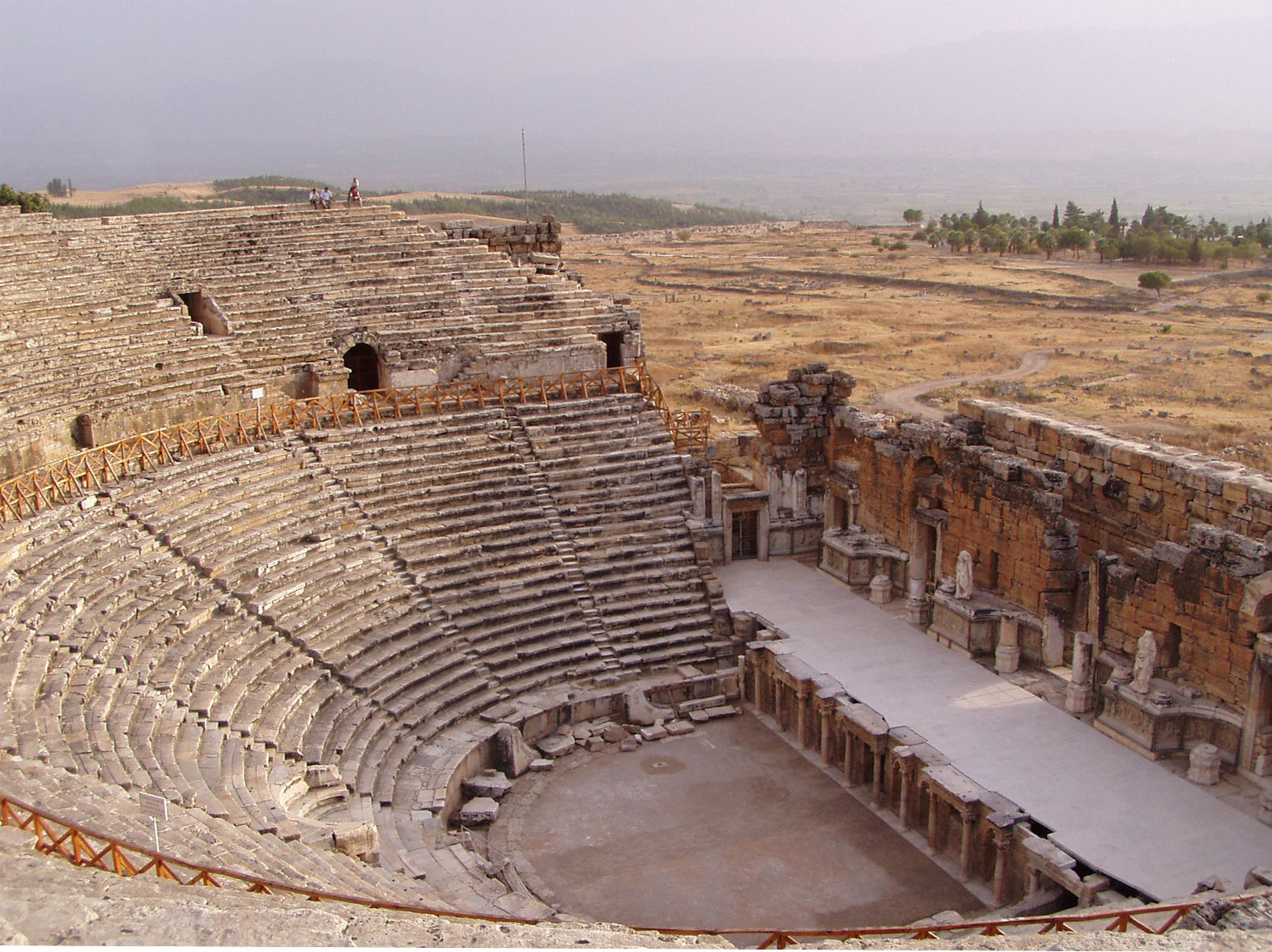
The amphitheatre in Hierapolis where "Konjam Neram" was shot.

Principal photography commenced on 24 October 2004 with a puja ceremony for the muhurat shot at Annai Illam, the residence of Sivaji Ganesan. Ramkumar Ganesan said the filming would be finished by 15 February 2005, giving the crew two months to complete the post-production work, including visual effects. The first shooting schedule began two days later with a fight scene choreographed by Thalapathy Dinesh and filmed at Ramavaram in Chennai. More than 25 Toyota Qualis and 30 stunt artists were involved in the fight sequence that featured Rajinikanth. The Vettaiyapuram mansion was erected in Hyderabad. The song sequences, one picturised on Rajini alone, two songs in which he appears with the other principal cast members, and the climax song, which was picturised on Jyothika, were filmed in Ramoji Film City. Vasu said the film had taken only 78 days to be completed instead of the planned 120 days.

The picturisation of the song "Devuda Devuda" focused on a variety of professions, especially janitors, sewage cleaners, farmers and washer folk. According to Ramji, who helped the production unit look for locations for the song "Konjam Neram", Ramkumar Ganesan and Vasu chose Turkey, making Chandramukhi the first Tamil film to be shot there. The production unit flew to Istanbul from Chennai via Dubai on 25 February 2005. The filming of the song was completed after the audio launch. "Konjam Neram" was shot in segments in Ephesus and Pamukkale. Shooting in Ephesus took six hours. The segment in Pamukkale was filmed in an amphitheatre in the ancient city of Hierapolis, which is located close to Pamukkale. The last segment was shot in the Cappadocia region, a 10-hour drive by bus from Istanbul. "Raa Raa" was choreographed by Kala and took four days to be completed instead of the planned seven days.

== Music ==
Vidyasagar composed the soundtrack album and the background score of Chandramukhi. The soundtrack album consists of six tracks with lyrics written by Vaali, Yugabharathi, Pa. Vijay, Na. Muthukumar and Bhuvana Chandra. The album was released on 5 March 2005 at the Taj Connemara hotel in Chennai.

== Release ==
The film was released on 14 April 2005, a Tamil New Year's Day release, alongside Kamal Haasan-starrer Mumbai Xpress and Vijay-starrer Sachein. Chandramukhi was released in 37 theatres in Malaysia, 15 in Europe, nine in Sri Lanka, seven in the United States, four each in Canada and the Persian Gulf countries and two each in Australia and Singapore. The film was released with 23 prints in Coimbatore, 12 more than Rajinikanth's Padayappa (1999).

Chandramukhi was screened at the 18th Tokyo International Film Festival in Japan on 23 October 2005 and 28 October 2005 as part of the 'Winds of Asia' section. It was the first public screening of the film in Japan. The film opened the 7th IIFA Awards Film Festival held at the Dubai International Convention Centre in Dubai, United Arab Emirates, becoming the first South Indian film to open the Film Festival. In November 2011, it was screened at the International Tamil Film Festival held in Uglich, Russia alongside Thillana Mohanambal (1968), Sivaji: The Boss (2007), Angadi Theru (2010), Boss Engira Bhaskaran (2010), Thenmerku Paruvakaatru (2010) and Ko (2011).

Though the film was a remake, Madhu Muttam, who wrote the story for Manichithrathazhu, was not mentioned in either the opening or closing credits. Instead, the story was credited to the director P. Vasu. Vasu defended himself by stating the script was not a scene-by-scene remake of the original and that only the basic plot was used. The film's television premiere occurred on Sun TV, on the occasion of Diwali on 27 October 2008.

== Marketing ==
The producers entered into a business dealing with Tata Indicom to promote the film; ringtones of the songs from the film's soundtrack and special screensavers were issued. Sunfeast Biscuits also helped in the film's promotion. They launched special merchandise which consists of cards, featuring Rajinikanth and some stills of Chandramukhi. Giant cutouts of Rajinikanth and film release posters were posted all over the state as a run-up for the release. The promotional campaign started in early March 2005 and continued mid-May that year. The film was screened in eight city theatres in Chennai. The theatrical rights of the film in the Coimbatore and Nilgiris districts combined were sold to local theatre owners Tirupur Balu and Seenu for ₹2.25 crore (US$230,000). (Note: The exchange rate in 2005 was 45.3 Indian rupees (₹) per 1 US dollar (US$).)

== Reception ==
=== Critical response ===
Writing for The Hindu, Malathi Rangarajan said, "As you watch the film you cannot but admire the ingenuity of writer-director P. Vasu in choosing a story that is bound to sell and at the same time helping Rajini maintain his image of an invincible hero", before concluding that, "The 'Mannan' team proves a winner again". Another critic from The Hindu, Sudhish Kamath, said Rajinikanth is "at his vintage best". A reviewer from The Times of India called the film "Entertaining, stylish, respectful of ritual, and always massively larger than life". Arun Ram of India Today said, "With Chandramukhi, Rajnikant revives his fading career and fortunes of Tamil cinema". G. Ulaganathan, writing for the Deccan Herald praised the chemistry between Rajinikanth and Vadivelu, saying "Rajinikanth is back in full form, comedy comes naturally to him and he finds an able ally in Vadivelu. Some of the best scenes in the movie are when both are together."

Tamil magazine Ananda Vikatan said in its review, "Rajni's films normally revolve around him but in this case, Rajni is in a script which goes around several people ... Rajni as Vettaiyan is the highlight of the film ... After many years, Rajni has shown that he does not confine to his personality cage through this film." and gave the film 40 marks out of 100. The Sify reviewer wrote that Chandramukhi was simply "a remake of P. Vasu's Apthamitra from Kannada with some additional songs, fights and comedy scenes thrown in to further boost the superstar's image" but like Ulaganathan, commended the comedy scenes of Rajinikanth and Vadivelu, terming them the film's highlight. A. Ganesh Nadar of Rediff said the film would become "a certain hit" and,"[t]he star will be happy, his fans will be happy and producer Prabhu will giggle all the way to the bank". Screen wrote "The strength of the Rajnikant-starrer Chandramukhi is its screenplay. Director P Vasu has worked very diligently on the screenplay, especially in the second half. Initially, one wondered what Rajnikant would do in a film that is centered on the heroine. But Rajnikant’s charisma and screen presence in the film makes all the difference".

V. Gangadhar of The Tribune wrote, "As in all Rajni films, Chandramukhi is a one-star attraction and Rajni plays to the gallery, There are no political messages in the film and that should come as some relief. With Nayanthara and Jyothika in the female leads, there is plenty of glamour in the film. But the message is clear, King Rajni is back. His legion of fans can not ask for more." Karthiga Rukmanykanthan writing for Daily News Sri Lanka said, " ... the long anticipated delight Chandramukhi has made itself the box-office hit of the year". Grady Hendrix of Slate appreciated Rajinikanth's characterisation in the film, calling the character, Saravanan's ability to read minds "well-trained" before concluding, "Rajinikanth's movies are crammed with comedy, action, and musical numbers and they take great delight in kicking narrative logic in the face."

=== Box office ===
Chandramukhi was a box office success, selling 20 million tickets worldwide and earning ₹150 million in salary and profit share for Rajinikanth. The film's distributors made a 20 per cent profit over the ₹25 million for which they bought the rights to the film. The film's 804th day celebration function was held at Kamaraj Arangam in Chennai on 25 June 2007. The then Chief Minister of Tamil Nadu, M. Karunanidhi, director K. Balachander, film producer and owner of AVM Productions M. Saravanan, Kamal Haasan and Sridevi attended the function. Karunanidhi presented the "Shivaji" sword to the film's cast and crew, and awards were given to everyone involved in the film.

==== India ====
Chandramukhi grossed ₹8.4 million in 11 days in eight screens in Chennai. In the Santham screen of Sathyam Cinemas, around 22,000 tickets were sold for the first 10 days of its release. Chandramukhi grossed ₹30 million in Coimbatore, beating the ₹24.5 million record set there by Padayappa. Chandramukhi received ₹60 million as Minimum Guarantee (MG) from theatres in North Arcot, South Arcot and Chengalpattu districts collectively. It was also a hit in Kerala where it grossed ₹711,545 in four days, doing better than the Mohanlal starrer Chandrolsavam, which also released on 14 April 2005, but grossed ₹523,340 during the same period of time.

The film's theatrical run lasted 890 days at Shanthi Theatre, beating the 62-year record set by the 1944 film Haridas, which ran for 784 days at the Broadway theatre, also in Chennai. The New Indian Express estimates that it grossed ₹650 million (US$14.3 million in 2005). It was the longest running South Indian film, until surpassed by the Telugu film Magadheera (2009), which completed a theatrical run of 1000 days in April 2012. According to Hindustan Times, it emerged the highest-grossing Indian film of 2005.

==== Overseas ====
Chandramukhi was screened in Tokyo in October 2005 to packed houses. Chandramukhi completed a 100-day theatrical run in South Africa. It collectively earned ₹43 million in Malaysia, UAE and the US during the first month of its theatrical run.

== Accolades ==
In an interview with The Hindu, Binny Krishnakumar said:

I will forever remain indebted to composer Vidyasagar, who gave me the song when I was a nobody in playback singing. I had given a cassette of my songs to Vidyasagar, who knew Krishnakumar. (Note: Krishnakumar is Binny's husband and also a professional Carnatic musician.) Then, about six months later, Vidyasagar invited me to record "Ra ra...". The way that song has helped me in my career—both as a playback and classical singer—has been incredible. I was lucky I got a song in a Rajnikanth film so early in my career and the Filmfare award for my very first song."

Award	Ceremony	Category	Nominee(s)	Outcome	Ref.
Filmfare Awards South	53rd Filmfare Awards South	Best Female Playback Singer	Binny Krishnakumar	Won	
Filmfare Awards South	53rd Filmfare Awards South	Best Comedian	Vadivelu	Won	
Tamil Nadu State Film Awards	Tamil Nadu State Film Award – 2005	Best Film	Chandramukhi	Won	
Tamil Nadu State Film Awards	Tamil Nadu State Film Award – 2005	Best Actor	Rajinikanth	Won	
Tamil Nadu State Film Awards	Tamil Nadu State Film Award – 2005	Best Actress	Jyothika	Won	
Tamil Nadu State Film Awards	Tamil Nadu State Film Award – 2005	Best Art Director	Thota Tharani	Won	
Tamil Nadu State Film Awards	Tamil Nadu State Film Award – 2005	Best Choreographer	Kala	Won	
Kalaimamani Awards	Kalaimamani – 2005	Honorary	Jyothika	Won	
Kalaimamani Awards	Kalaimamani – 2005	Honorary	Vadivelu	Won	
Film Fans' Association Award	55th Annual Film Fans' Association Award; Cine bests of 2005	Best Entertainment Movie	Chandramukhi	Won	
Film Fans' Association Award	55th Annual Film Fans' Association Award; Cine bests of 2005	Best Actress	Jyothika	Won	
Film Fans' Association Award	55th Annual Film Fans' Association Award; Cine bests of 2005	Best Lyricist	Vaali	Won	
Film Fans' Association Award	55th Annual Film Fans' Association Award; Cine bests of 2005	Best Comedian	Vadivelu	Won	

== Scientific accuracy ==
In an August 2005 seminar on revisiting psychiatric disorders which centred around Chandramukhi and Anniyan, psychiatrist Asokan noted that there were many logical faults in both films; Vasu said he knew nothing about psychiatric disorders. Writing for PopMatters in 2014, Kumuthan Maderya criticised Vasu for confusing "spirit possession with Dissociative Identity Disorder, conflating both to create pop psychology" and "ostensibly fusing modern science and demonology for the sake of intellectualism".

== Legacy ==
"Rajinikanth attributed the success of the film mainly to Vasu's script and the performance of his co-artistes. He said his comedy track with Vadivelu went a long way in making the film a successful venture and that it helped bring audiences to the theatres to watch the film more than once. He also said female viewers loved the portrayal of the female cast."

— Journalist Sreedhar Pillai speech in an interview with The Hindu.

Split personality disorder became well known after the film's release. MIOT International Hospital, in a blog description of the syndrome, called it The Chandramukhi syndrome. Film artist, trainer and filmmaker L. Satyanand said Chandramukhi is a classic example of the subgenre "horror of the demonic" and of "brilliance", ranking it alongside The Legend of Sleepy Hollow and Psycho (1960). The film became a trendsetter for later horror films in Tamil such as the Muni series, Yavarum Nalam (2009), Eeram (2009), Pizza (2012), Yaamirukka Bayamey (2014), the Aranmanai series, Darling (2015) and Demonte Colony (2015).

Sivaji Productions joined Galatta Media and eBay for an online auction of the film's memorabilia, becoming the first South Indian film to auction film merchandise. Ramkumar Ganesan said the proceeds of the auction would be given to the Sivaji Prabhu Charity Trust and that ₹300,000 (US$6,650 in 2005) would be given to Papanchatram Middle School. Sophie Atphthavel from France bought Rajinikanth's sunglasses, which he sported in the film, for ₹25,000 (US$554 in 2005). According to Girish Ramdas, chief operating officer of Galatta Media, all the items had certificates of authenticity signed by the film's producers. Bidding for the items ranged between ₹10,000 (US$222 in 2005) and ₹20,000 (US$444 in 2005).

In a statement by eBay, the articles made available for bidding were Rajinikanth's blue shirt worn in the song "Devuda Devuda", Jyothika's saree worn for the climax scenes, the peach-coloured saree worn by Nayanthara in the song "Konja Neram", and the Vettaiyan Raja costume and ornaments worn on set by Rajinikanth. Rajinikanth's dress, which he wore in "Devuda Devuda", was sold for ₹25,000 (US$554 in 2005). His Vettaiyan costume and ornament set were sold for ₹32,000 (US$709 in 2005).

== In popular culture ==
Some scenes, lines and expressions from the film, such as the "Laka Laka Laka Laka..." sound that Rajnikanth's character makes, became very popular, especially with children. Vadivelu's expressions and scenes—especially those with Rajinikanth—and lines including "Maapu?...Vachittandaa Aapu!!!" (transl. Dude?...He screwed me up!!!), also became popular. A line spoken by Rajinikanth to Prabhu, "Naan gunda irundha nalla irukkadhu...nee elachcha nalla irukkadhu" (transl. I won't look good if I put on weight...but you won't look good if you have reduced weight) evoked a lot of laughter among audiences.

Prabhu's line, "Enna kodumai Saravanan idhu?" (transl. What atrocity is this, Saravanan?) became popular. It is usually used to express irony or surprise. The line was often parodied by Premgi Amaren, who altered it slightly to "Enna kodumai Sir idhu?" (transl. What atrocity is this, sir?) and used it in most of his featured films, subsequently becoming the actor's catchphrase. Prabhu, in an interview with Malathi Rangarajan of The Hindu, expressed appreciation for the way his "serious line" was made into a comical one. The line is abbreviated to "EKSI" in chat and SMS language and is available on the Urban Dictionary apart from memes online.

=== Parodies ===
Chandramukhi was parodied in various films. In a comedy scene from Englishkaran (2005), Theeppori Thirumugam (Vadivelu) invents an idea to frighten Thamizharasu (Sathyaraj) but the ruse backfires on him as he witnesses Thamizharasu in a garb similar to that of Chandramukhi's. In the Telugu film Rajababu (2006), the characters played by Rajinikanth and Jyothika are reenacted by Brahmanandam and Kovai Sarala, respectively. In a scene from Thalaimagan (2006), Erimalai (Vadivelu), after entering an old abandoned bungalow, gets frightened when he hears the "Lakka Lakka" sound, and says "Yaaro Telugula Koopuddrangga!" (transl. "Someone is calling in Telugu!"). In Vallavan (2006), Vallavan (Silambarasan) is seen singing "Konja Neram" to Swapna (Nayanthara). In Sivaji: The Boss (2007), Thamizhselvi (Shriya Saran) would be seen dancing for the song "Raa Raa", Sivaji (Rajinikanth) and Arivu (Vivek) are seen uttering the last lines of the song. Livingston who appears as a police inspector, utters the sound "Lakka Lakka" which Rajinikanth makes in Chandramukhi. Rajinikanth and Nayanthara's characters act in a film within a film titled Chandramukhi 2 in a scene from Kuselan (2008), which P. Vasu also directed. In Padikkadavan (2009), Assault Arumugam (Vivek) imitates Rajinikanth's tornado creating leg movement from the introduction scene when arriving in Andhra Pradesh. In Tamizh Padam (2010), Shiva (Shiva) would be seen imitating the film's introduction scene by stretching his leg when it is revealed that Siva has a split seam in his pants. Sundar C's role in the film Aranmanai (2014) was inspired by Rajinikanth's role in Chandramukhi. Chandramukhi was parodied in the Star Vijay comedy series Lollu Sabha, in an episode named "Chappamukhi".

== Other versions ==
Chandramukhi was dubbed in Turkish with the same title and in Bhojpuri under the title Chandramukhi Ke Hunkaar. It is the first Tamil film to be dubbed into German. It was released in Germany under the title, Der Geisterjäger (transl. The Ghost Hunters). Despite the release of Manichitrathazhu's Hindi remake Bhool Bhulaiyaa in 2007 (which had the working title of Chandramukhi), Chandramukhi's Hindi dubbed version was released in 2008.

== Sequel ==
In April 2020, a sequel, Chandramukhi 2, to be produced by Sun Pictures was announced, but was eventually taken over by Lyca Productions in June 2022, owing to the delays from the COVID-19 pandemic. P. Vasu returned as the director with confirmed cast members including Raghava Lawrence, Kangana Ranaut, Lakshmi Menon and Vadivelu, who reprised his role as Murugesan. Principal photography began in mid-July 2022, and wrapped by mid-August 2023. The film released on 28 September 2023 and was a major commercial and critical failure.

== Spin-off ==
A spin off to Chandramukhi, named Nagavalli, was made in Telugu. It was a remake of Aptharakshaka (2010), which itself was a direct sequel to Apthamitra (2004). It was directed by P. Vasu and released on 16 December 2010.

== See also ==
- Dissociative Identity Disorder
- Muni (film series)
- Aranmanai (film series)
- List of ghost films

== Sources ==
- Ramachandran, Naman (2014) [2012]. Rajinikanth: The Definitive Biography. Penguin Books. ISBN 978-81-8475-796-5.
