= Shanti Theatre =

Defunct movie theatre in Chennai, India

- Location: Chennai, Tamil Nadu

Construction
- Opened: 12 January 1961
- Closed: May 2016
- Builders: G. Umapathy; D. Shanmuga Raja

Shanti Theatre was an Indian movie theatre in Chennai, Tamil Nadu. Built by G. Umapathy and D. Shanmuga Raja, and inaugurated in January 1961, it was bought by actor Sivaji Ganesan, and was owned by his family since. In May 2016, Shanti ceased screening films, and was re-invented by its owners as an office space.

== History ==
Shanti Theatre was built by G. Umapathy and D. Shanmuga Raja, then the Raja of Sivaganga. It was inaugurated on 12 January 1961 by then Chief Minister of Tamil Nadu, K. Kamaraj, and was the first deluxe air-conditioned theatre in Madras (now Chennai) with 1212 seats. The inaugural show was Srinivasa Kalyanam, and the first film to be released there officially was Thooya Ullam, followed by the Hindi film, Kalpana.

Paava Mannippu, a Tamil film, was released in Shanti on 16 March 1961. When the film's original promoters were facing a repayment cash crisis, they approached star Sivaji Ganesan who agreed to invest, and eventually bought out the promoters. The theatre had been owned by Ganesan's family ever since. The theatre is widely believed to have been named after Ganesan's daughter Shanti. According to Ganesan's nephew Giri Shanmugam, "Shanti Theatre became a landmark in the city because it was owned by the great Sivaji Ganesan. Watching a Sivaji movie in Shanti was on the must-to-do list, besides seeing Marina Beach and LIC – the only 14-storeyed building in the city then, for most visitors from other parts of Tamil Nadu."

After Paava Mannippu, the theatre proceeded to screen an additional 81 films starring Ganesan. Some of his films like Paava Mannippu, Thiruvilaiyadal, Vasantha Maligai, Thanga Pathakkam, Thirisoolam and Muthal Mariyathai became silver jubilee films, (Note: A silver jubilee film is one that completes a theatrical run of 175 days.) while others achieved a 100-day run. During the celebrations of Karnan's 100th day in 1964, the theatre wore a festive look, with a real chariot created and kept for display. N. T. Rama Rao, who portrayed Krishna in that film, attended the event with various stars from the film.

In 1964, the Hindi film Sangam ran for 188 days in the theatre. When it was running successfully, Ganesan faced a dilemma; his own production, Puthiya Paravai, was scheduled to release and he was eager to release it in Shanti. When Sangam's lead actor Raj Kapoor learnt of this, he personally requested Ganesan to allow a longer run for Sangam in Shanti, since no other theatre in Madras had such facilities; Ganesan assented and released Puthiya Paravai at the nearby Paragon theatre. The Sivaji Productions film Chandramukhi (2005) played for 888 days straight in Shanti.

== Future ==
In mid-2016, it was announced that Shanti would no longer be a theatre, and would be re-invented as a multiplex, while still retaining the name Shanti. The last film to be screened was 24.

In 2020, it was decided that the theatre located in arterial Anna Salai would be converted into complex hosting various offices. Owner of theatre complex had entered into joint venture with Real Estate Developers, Akshaya Pvt Ltd and planned to rename the building Akshaya Shanti Office Suites, having office space of 86,783 sq. ft with sale or lease options and with additional space for gymnasium, built-in restaurant and terrace garden of 4,535 ft.
