= Sesh Anka =

- Directed by: Haridas Bhattacharya
- Screenplay by: Haridas Bhattacharya
- Dialogues by: Shyamal Gupta
- Story by: Rajkumar Maitra
- Based on: Chase A Crooked Shadow by: Michael Anderson; David D. Osborn and Charles Sinclair
- Produced by: Narendranath Chatterjee
- Starring: Uttam Kumar; Sharmila Tagore; Sabitri Chatterjee; Pahari Sanyal; Utpal Dutt; Bikash Roy; Kamal Mitra
- Cinematography: Kanai Dey
- Edited by: Santosh Ganguly
- Music by: Songs: Pabitra Chatterjee; Background score: Sailen Roy
- Production company: Kalpana Movies Pvt Ltd
- Distributed by: Kalpana Movies
- Release date: 1 February 1963
- Running time: 131 minutes
- Country: India
- Language: Bengali

Sesh Anka (transl. The final act) is a 1963 Indian Bengali-language thriller film directed by Haridas Bhattacharya and made by Kalpana Movies, Kolkata. This film was loosely inspired by the 1958 film Chase a Crooked Shadow. The film starred Uttam Kumar in lead with Sharmila Tagore, Sabitri Chatterjee, Pahadi Sanyal, Bikash Roy, Kamal Mitra and others in supporting role. The film was remade in Tamil in 1964 as Puthiya Paravai and was an inspiration for the Hindi movie Khoj (1989).

== Plot ==
Widower Sudhangsu is going to be married to Soma, daughter of Sir Haraprasad. Sudhangsu is presented as a cheerful person who loves his would-be partner Soma and adores her with all his heart, occasionally gifting her with ornaments. He already declares that his first wife Kalpana committed suicide on a railway track in Burma, stating that she was mentally challenged. At the time of Sudhangsu's second marriage, a local senior advocate, Suren Banerjee comes with a lady who claims herself as Sudhangsu's first wife. Sudhangsu strongly denies and alleges that she is an imposter. In the meantime, a mysterious person named Samadder invades Sudhangsu's house and steals some ornaments of the deceased Kalpana. The case goes for a trial to determine whether the unknown lady is really Kalpana or not. Advocate Suren Banerjee examines all the witnesses attached to the case. The courtroom drama wrestles to defend the unknown lady's position against her proclaimed husband. Sudhangsu starts losing his sanity with time growing out of his hands. Having no other witness to support his case, Sudhangsu's Barrister Mr. Mitter compels his client to telegram Deben Sen, brother of Kalpana to determine the identity of his sister. The story revolves around the activities of Sudhangsu and his past in the courtroom drama. Deben, however, recognizes the unknown lady as his sister without an air of doubt. Finally, Sudhangsu having lost all his reasons confesses how the lady couldn't be Kalpana.

== Cast ==
- Uttam Kumar as Sudhanshu Gupta
- Bikash Roy as Karanjaksha Samadder / Salim Mia / Ramanimohan Halder
- Sharmila Tagore as Soma
- Kamal Mitra as Adv. Suren Banerjee
- Utpal Dutt as Barrister Mitter (Cameo appearance)
- Sabitri Chatterjee as Lata Bose/ Fake Kalpana
- Pahari Sanyal as Sir Haraprasad
- Tarun Kumar Chatterjee as Deben Sen
- Jiben Bose as Mamababu
- Dipak Mukherji as Assistant Police Commissioner

== Soundtrack ==
Sesh Anko

Soundtrack album by Pabitra Chatterjee, Sailen Roy
- Released: 1963
- Recorded: 1962
- Studio: Kalpana Movies Pvt Ltd
- Length: 0:09:39
- Label: Angel Digital Pvt Ltd
- Producer: Narendranath Chattopadhyay

All lyrics are written by Shyamal Gupta, Pranob Roy; all music is composed by Pabitra Chatterjee, Sailen Roy.

Songs
No.	Title	Playback	Length
1.	"Aami To Jani"	Hemanta Mukherjee	3:13
2.	"Ankhi Jage Shyamrup Raage"	Sandhya Mukherjee	3:13
3.	"Chand Jage Batayane"	Hemanta Mukherjee	3:13
Total length:			09:39

== Reception ==
Uttam Kumar played an unusual role as a murderer. The Times of India wrote, "Sesh Anka which is yet another criminally underrated film. 'Sesh Anka’ delivers a different side of Uttam Kumar’s usual portrayal of heroism or a romantic hero."
