= Kumara Raja (1978 film) =

1978 Telugu film by P. Sambasiva Rao

- Directed by: P. Sambasiva Rao
- Written by: Jandhyala (Dialogues)
- Based on: Shankar Guru (Kannada)
- Produced by: Suryanarayana; Satyanarayana
- Starring: Krishna; Jaya Prada; Satyanarayana; Jayanti; Latha; Mohan Babu
- Cinematography: V. S. R. Swamy
- Edited by: Kotagiri Gopala Rao
- Music by: K. V. Mahadevan
- Production company: Satya Chithra
- Release date: 6 October 1978
- Country: India
- Language: Telugu

Kumara Raja is a 1978 Indian Telugu-language action film directed by P. Sambasiva Rao. The film stars Krishna, Jaya Prada, Satyanarayana, Jayanti and Latha. Krishna enacted triple roles of a wronged businessman, Rajasekhar and his estranged twin sons — Kumar and Raja. The film has musical score by K. V. Mahadevan. The film is a remake of the 1978 Kannada movie Shankar Guru.

Released on 6 October 1978 the film emerged as a major commercial success. Kotagiri Gopala Rao edited the film while V. S. R. Swamy handled the cinematography.

== Cast ==
- Krishna as Rajasekharam, Kumar & Raja (Triple Role)
- Jaya Prada
- Satyanarayana
- Jayanthi
- Latha
- Mohan Babu
- Nagabushanam
- Giri Babu
- Allu Ramalingaiah
- Pushpa Kumari
- Rajababu

== Soundtrack ==
The film's soundtrack was scored and composed by K. V. Mahadevan.

1. "Aagali Aagali"" — Balu, P. Susheela
2. "Aggini Nenu" — Balu, Rama Krishna
3. "Anuragadevatha" — Balu
4. "Neemata Vinte" — Rama Krishna, P. Susheela
5. "Seethakokka" — Balu
6. "Vichukunna" — Balu, P. Susheela
