= Shankar Guru (1978 film) =

1978 film by V. Somashekhar

- Theatrical release poster
- Directed by: V. Somashekhar
- Screenplay by: M. D. Sundar
- Dialogues by: Chi. Udayashankar
- Story by: Dakshayini Combines
- Produced by: Parvathamma Rajkumar
- Starring: Rajkumar; Kanchana; Jayamala; Padmapriya
- Cinematography: R. Madhusudan
- Edited by: P. Bhaktavatsalam
- Music by: Upendra Kumar
- Production company: Dakshayini Combines
- Release date: 17 February 1978
- Running time: 179 minutes
- Country: India
- Language: Kannada
- Box office: ₹3.26 crore

Shankar Guru is a 1978 Indian Kannada-language action thriller film directed by V. Somashekhar and produced by Parvathamma Rajkumar under Dakshayini Combines. It stars Dr. Rajkumar in triple role, alongside Jayamala, Padmapriya, Kanchana, Balakrishna, Vajramuni, Thoogudeepa Srinivas and Uma Shivakumar. The music was composed by Upendra Kumar, while the cinematography and editing were handled by R. Madhusudan and P. Bhaktavatsalam.

Shankar Guru marks Parvathamma Rajkumar's debut as a producer. The film was shot extensively in and around Kashmir. The film was the second film of Rajkumar after Kula Gourava in which he played a triple role and his only colour film in a triple role.

Shankar Guru was released on 17 February 1978 to widespread critical acclaim and became an all-time blockbuster at the box office. P. Bhaktavatsalam won the Karnataka State Film Award for Best Editor. The film was remade in Telugu as Kumara Raja, in Tamil as Thirisoolam and in Hindi as Mahaan.

== Plot ==
Rajashekhar is an upright business magnate whose associates are involved in shady deals. During an argument over such a deal, a scuffle ensues and Rajashekhar accidentally shoots one of his associates dead. Fleeing from the cops, Rajashekhar loses contact with his pregnant wife Sumathi.

Many years later, Sumathi is now living with her son Shankar in Delhi, while Rajashekhar is a rich estate owner in Kashmir. Rajashekhar's niece Nalini encounters Shankar in Delhi and recommends him to manage her uncle's estate in Kashmir. Guru, Shankar's doppelgänger, also arrives in Kashmir for a romantic quest with his rich girlfriend Malathi. Through Shankar, Rajashekhar manages to establish contact with Sumathi and is overwhelmed with joy.

Before Rajashekhar can meet Sumathi, trouble arrives in the form of Rajashekhar's erstwhile crooked business partners, who are after a valuable necklace stolen from a temple in Delhi, which they believe is now in Rajashekhar's possession. The partners kidnap Sumathi and imprison and torture Rajashekhar and a final fight ensues in which Shankar and Guru (who are revealed to be twins) rescue and reunite with their parents.

== Cast ==
- Rajkumar as:
  - Rajashekhar alias Jayaraj
  - Shankar, Rajashekhar's son and Guru's brother
  - Guru, Rajashekhar's son and Shankar's brother
- Jayamala as Nalini, Rajashekhar's niece
- Padmapriya as Malathi, Guru's love interest
- Kanchana as Sumati, Rajashekhar's wife and Shankar and Guru's mother
- Balakrishna as Adv. Lakshman Rao, Guru's foster father
- Vajramuni as Premkumar
- Thoogudeepa Srinivas as Madanlal
- Sampath as Gurumurthy, Malathi's Grandfather
- Tiger Prabhakar as Tiger
- Uma Shivakumar as Dr. Prema, Lakshman Rao's Sister
- Cudavalli Chandrashekar as Divakar alias Duplicate Shankar, Madanlal's Son
- Chi. Udayashankar
- Honnavalli Krishna
- Vaishali Kasaravalli
- Keerthi Raj

== Soundtrack ==
Shankar Guru

Soundtrack album by Upendra Kumar
- Released: 1978
- Genre: Feature film soundtrack
- Label: Saregama

The music was composed by Upendra Kumar with lyrics for the soundtrack written by Chi. Udayashankar.

Track list
No.	Title	Lyrics	Singer(s)	Length
1.	"Cheluveya Nota Chenna"	Chi. Udayashankar	Dr. Rajkumar
2.	"Love Me Or Hate Me"	Chi. Udayashankar	Dr. Rajkumar
3.	"Eneno Aase Nee Thanda"	Chi. Udayashankar	Dr. Rajkumar; Vani Jayaram
4.	"Chinna Baallali Ee Raathri"	Chi. Udayashankar	Dr. Rajkumar
5.	"Naa Benkiyanthe Naa Gaaliyanthe"	Chi. Udayashankar	Rajkumar; P. B. Sreenivas
6.	"Cheluveya Nota Chenna (sad)"	Chi. Udayashankar	Dr. Rajkumar

== Release ==
Shankar Guru was released on 17 February 1978

== Reception ==
Shankar Guru garnered positive responses from the audience as well as critics and was a phenomenal success in all centers and completed 100 days in many theatres. The film had a theatrical run of over a year and grossed ₹3.26 crore in its final run. The film was declared a industry hit when it became the first Kannada film to gross over ₹3 crores at the box office, breaking the record of 1972 film Bangaarada Manushya which also made the movie the highest grossing Kannada film of the 1970's.

== Remakes ==
It was remade in Tamil as Thirisoolam, in Telugu as Kumara Raja and in Hindi as Mahaan in which Rajkumar's characters were played by Sivaji Ganesan, Krishna and Amitabh Bachchan respectively. The Telugu version had Jayanthi reprising Kanchana's role, while Jaya Prada reprised the role of Padmapriya. The names of all the characters including the henchmen were retained in the Tamil version.

== Awards ==
- 1977–78 Karnataka State Film Awards
  - Best Editor – P. Bhaktavatsalam

== Trivia ==
The film's title Shankar Guru was named after Chi. Udayashankar's sons Ravishankar and Chi. Guru Dutt. It was the first film in which Tiger Prabhakar's character was named Tiger, and also marks Chandrashekhar's second collaboration with Rajkumar after Raja Nanna Raja. During the making of the film, S. K. Bhagavan narrated a play called Lithuania by Rupert Brooke (titled The Return of the Soldier in Russian) to Rajkumar. The film was planned to be shot in Ladakh and some preparation was undertaken, but Dr. Rajkumar backed out as he felt the story was too dark. In 2018, Dayal Padmanabhan adapted the play into a film titled Aa Karaala Ratri.
