= Sidney Sladen =

Kenya-born fashion designer

- Born: Sidney Sladen; 17 November 1979 (age 46); Mombasa, Kenya
- Education: Loyola College, Chennai
- Occupation: Fashion Designer

Sidney Sladen (born 17 November 1979) is a fashion designer of Kenyan Origin who also worked as costume designer for many Indian films.

== Personal life ==
He was born in Kenya but came to Chennai when he was eight years old. At 12 years, he began designing costumes for dolls, whilst also taking up a month's course in the Tamil Nadu Advanced Training Institute. He has also studied Visual communication in Loyola College, Chennai. He then studied fashion designing in Italy. He has a fashion designing studio in Cathedral Road, Chennai.

== Work in films ==
He made his debut as costume designer for the film Five Star (2002). Some of the films for which he did costume designing include Ice (2003), Chandramukhi (2005), Nenjil Jil Jil (2006) and Silambattam (2008).
