= Anand (1987 film) =

1987 film

- Theatrical release poster
- Directed by: C. V. Rajendran
- Screenplay by: Sivachandran
- Story by: Dasari Narayana Rao
- Produced by: Shanthi Narayanasami; T. Manohar
- Starring: Prabhu; Radha; Jayashree
- Cinematography: G. Or. Nathan
- Edited by: N. Chandran
- Music by: Ilaiyaraaja
- Production company: Sivaji Productions
- Release date: 20 November 1987
- Country: India
- Language: Tamil

Anand is a 1987 Indian Tamil-language romantic drama film, directed by C. V. Rajendran and produced by Sivaji Productions. The film stars Prabhu, Radha and Jayashree. A remake of the 1987 Telugu film Majnu, it was released on 20 November 1987.

== Cast ==
- Prabhu as Anand
- Radha as Latha
- Jayashree as Geetha
- Chinni Jayanth
- Vennira Aadai Moorthy
- Y Gee Mahendran
- Usilai Mani
- Kullamani
- Cho Ramaswamy as Anand's father
- Sathyajith as Soori
- Sivachandran as Manohar

== Production ==
The songs "Aararo Aararo" and "Thodatha Thaalam" were shot at Ooty.

== Soundtrack ==
Soundtrack was composed by Ilaiyaraaja. Lyrics were by Gangai Amaran. Anand was the first Tamil film since the 1950s where Lata Mangeshkar sang; she performed without taking remuneration out of respect for Prabhu's father Sivaji Ganesan. The song "I Want To Tell You Something" is unique in Tamil cinema as the chorus is entirely in English. The song "Aararo Aararo" is set in the raga Kalyani, and "Ola Kudisaiyile" is set to Shivaranjani.

Song	Singers
"Aararo Aararo"	Lata Mangeshkar
"I Want To Tell You Something"	S. P. Balasubrahmanyam, S.P. Sailaja
"Ola Kudisaiyile"	S. P. Balasubrahmanyam
"Thodatha Thaalam"	S. P. Balasubrahmanyam, S. Janaki
"Hey You Come"	S. P. Balasubrahmanyam
"Poovukku Poovale"	S. P. Balasubrahmanyam

== Critical reception ==
The Indian Express wrote, "As both lovers belong to the upper class, the décor of the interiors is modish. G.OR. Nathan's photography accentuates this effect: the soft and diffuse lighting gives the film a classy texture". Jayamanmadhan of Kalki gave the film a mixed review, panning Prabhu's acting, the humour and Ilaiyaraaja's background score but praised his songs and Radha's acting and concluded saying it is neither too great nor lip smacking. Balumani of Anna praised the acting, music, dialogues, cinematography but felt despite having many positives, due to lack of clarity in screenplay the film becomes boring at times.

== Bibliography ==
- Sundararaman (2007) [2005]. Raga Chintamani: A Guide to Carnatic Ragas Through Tamil Film Music (2nd ed.). Pichhamal Chintamani. OCLC 295034757.
