= Theerkadarishi =

2023 Indian Tamil Crime Thriller film

- Theatrical release poster
- Directed by: P.G. Mohan; L.R. Sundarapandian
- Written by: B Sathishkumar
- Produced by: B Sathishkumar
- Starring: Sathyaraj; Ajmal Ameer
- Cinematography: J. Lakshmanan
- Edited by: Ranjeet.C.K
- Music by: G. Balasubramanian
- Release date: 5 May 2023
- Country: India
- Language: Tamil

Theerkadarisi (transl. Prophet) is a 2023 Indian Tamil-language action thriller film written and directed by P.G. Mohan and L.R. Sundarapandi. The film stars Sathyaraj and Ajmal Ameer, with Poornima Bhagyaraj, Dhushyanth, Jaiwanth, Sriman and Devadarshini portraying supporting roles. It was released on 5 May 2023.

== Synopsis ==
A stranger keeps calling the police control room to tip them off about various crimes and accidents that are about to occur in the near future.

== Cast ==
- Sathyaraj as Daas
- Ajmal Ameer as DC Adithya IPS
- Poornima Bhagyaraj
- Dushyanth Ramkumar as Vikram
- Jaiwanth
- Sriman as Srinivasan
- Devadarshini as Hema
- Arjunan as Vignesh
- Y. G. Mahendran as Dr. Iniyan
- P. L. Thenappan
- Aadukalam Naren
- Uma Padmanabhan
- Mohan Raman
- Indumathy Manikandan
- Aadhirai Soundarajan
- Charles Vinoth
- Imman Annachi
- Ambani Shankar
- Munnar Ramesh
- Karate Raja
- Anthony Daasan as Folk Marley
- Rahul Thatha
- Bijili Ramesh
- Mippu
- Rajendranath
- Ajit Koshy

== Production ==
The film was produced by B. Sathish Kumar under the banner of Sri Saravana Films. The film was shot in Chennai and Puducherry. The cinematography of the film was done by J. Laxman, and the editing of the film was done by Ranjeet C.K.

== Music ==
The music is composed by G. Balasubramanian. Lyrics were written by M.Viveka and Vivek.

No.	Title	Lyrics	Singer	Length
1.	"Andam Aada"	Viveka	Yogi Sekar	3.50
2.	"Miss You"	Vivek	G. V. Prakash Kumar	3.31
3.	"Police Kaaran"	Viveka	Anthony Daasan	3.31
Total length:				10.12

== Reception ==
Logesh Balachandran of The Times of India gave 3/5 stars and wrote that "Theerkadarshi, while not an extraordinary film, is a decent watch as it remains true to its genre". Navein Darshan of Cinema Express gave 1.5/5 stars and wrote that "Despite having proven performers like Devadardarshini, Ajmal and Sriman in the cast, the directors only manage to reduce them to uni-dimensional caricatures". A critic from Maalai Malar noted that " New try" and gave 2.5 ratings out of 5.Dina Thanthi critic stated that "They also make people aware of the social opinion against homicide. The climax is riveting."
