= Kalaignan =

1993 film by G. B. Vijay

- Theatrical release poster
- Directed by: G. B. Vijay
- Written by: Rajaram Raghunath (dialogues)
- Screenplay by: G. B Vijay
- Story by: G. B Vijay
- Produced by: Ramkumar Ganesan
- Starring: Kamal Haasan; Farheen
- Cinematography: Jayanan Vincent
- Edited by: P. Mohanraj
- Music by: Ilaiyaraaja
- Production company: Sivaji Productions
- Release date: 14 April 1993
- Running time: 143 minutes
- Country: India
- Language: Tamil

Kalaignan (transl. Artist) is a 1993 Indian Tamil-language thriller film written and directed by G. B. Vijay and produced by Ramkumar Ganesan. It stars Kamal Haasan and Farheen (credited as Bindiya) while Sivaranjani, Sindhuja, Nirmalamma and Chi. Guru Dutt play supporting roles. It was released on 14 April 1993 Tamil New Year. Although it received positive reviews, the movie attracted only elite audience and underperformed at the box-office.

== Plot ==
Indrajith is a Tamil pop singer based in Bangalore with a large female following. When a back-up dancer, Sandhya, in Indrajith's group, is murdered under mysterious circumstances, the police suspect Indrajith, but they have no evidence linking him to the crime. Meanwhile, Sandhya's sister Divya arrives at her aunt Dr. Prabhavathy's house to find out the truth about Sandhya's death. She gets off on the wrong foot with Indrajith. She talks to his manager, Harichandra Prasad, and other musicians who all have differing opinions about Sandhya.

While investigating, Divya stages an attack in a bar, getting Indrajith to save her and takes her to his concert. At the end of the concert, Jennifer, a fan, gets on stage and kisses him. That night, Jennifer is killed by someone wearing Indrajith's coat. With no better evidence, the police keep a closer eye on Indrajith and warn Divya that Indrajith is a possible suspect in Sandhya's death. Divya stages a kidnapping to test Indrajith's knife skills (all the women murdered were skillfully cut by the murderer). But the next day, Indrajith sees Divya with the bandaged kidnapper walking out of the hospital and realizes that she was faking her love.

He comes clean to her about Sandhya. She was an unstable substance abuser who had a thing for him, but he did not reciprocate. She had threatened to commit suicide if he did not reciprocate. He managed to save her and that was the last he had seen of her. The killer, who has pictures that look incriminating, has been blackmailing him into coming to the murder scenes just minutes after the murders. Divya believes him and falls for him.

In the course of a long cat-and-mouse sequence between the killer and Indrajith, the killer is revealed to be Harichandra Prasad the manager, who attacks Dr. Prabhavathy but she survives. Indrajith finds similar clothing in his closet, and later finds a secret room filled with photographs of the victims. The killer then kidnaps Divya and tells Indrajith to come to an abandoned house with the photographs. His motive is revealed to be jealousy of the women who lusted after Indrajith and ignored him.

During a chase and fight scene, Harichandra Prasad gets killed. Indrajith's name is cleared, and everyone gets their happy ending.

== Cast ==
- Kamal Haasan as Indrajith
- Bindiya as Divya
- Sivaranjani as Sandhya
- Sindhuja as Indrajith's fan
- Chi Guru Dutt as Dr. Harichandra Prasad
- Nirmalamma as Dr. Prabhavathy
- Nassar as Devananthan
- Ashok Rao as Gangadharan
- Chinni Jayanth as Indrajith's assistant
- R. S. Shivaji as Indrajith's assistant
- Kazan Khan as Anwar
- Mohan Raman as Psychiatrist
- Yuvasri as Indrajith's mother
- Ajay Rathnam

== Production ==
The film was initially titled Indrajit, but was later retitled Kalaignan. G. B. Vijay was associate director for Pratap Pothen and worked with Kamal Haasan in 1989 film Vettri Vizhaa which was directed by Pratap and produced by Sivaji Productions. While filming an action sequence in a subway, Haasan's spine was struck by a speeding car; this resulted in a dislocated jaw, cracked nose and three fractures, but Haasan eventually recovered. Farheen, also known as Bindiya, was offered this film around the same time as Baazigar, and she refused Baazigar to accept this film.

== Soundtrack ==
The music was composed by Ilaiyaraaja and lyrics were written by Vaali. The song "Endhan Nenjil" is set in the Carnatic raga known as Nalinakanthi, and "Dillu Baru Jaane" is set in Sankarabharanam.

Track listing
No.	Title	Lyrics	Singer(s)	Length
1.	"Edekku Muddakanna"	Vaali	S. P. Balasubrahmanyam	5:48
2.	"Kalaignan Kattu Kaval"	Vaali	S. P. Balasubrahmanyam	5:37
3.	"Kokkarako Kozhi"	Vaali	Kamal Haasan	5:06
4.	"Dillu Baru Jaane"	Vaali	Mano, K. S. Chithra	5:40
5.	"Endhan Nenjil"	Vaali	K. J. Yesudas, S. Janaki	4:37
Total length:				26:48

== Release and reception ==
Kalaignan was released on 14 April 1993, Puthandu. Ayyappa Prasad of The Indian Express wrote, "A mixture of Sakala Kala Vallavan and Sigappu Rojakkal, the director has used every trick in the book to make the film a slick presentation" but that he went "overboard in the climax". G. B. Vijay later moved away from directing feature films and apprenticed under Rajiv Menon as an ad filmmaker. He played a pivotal role in mentoring Gautham Vasudev Menon, while he went on to write the dialogues for Minsara Kanavu (1997).

== Bibliography ==
- Sundararaman (2007) [2005]. Raga Chintamani: A Guide to Carnatic Ragas Through Tamil Film Music (2nd ed.). Pichhamal Chintamani. OCLC 295034757.
