= Chase a Crooked Shadow =

1958 British film by Michael Anderson

- Film poster
- Directed by: Michael Anderson
- Written by: David D. Osborn; Charles Sinclair
- Produced by: Thomas Clyde; Douglas Fairbanks Jr.
- Starring: Richard Todd; Anne Baxter; Herbert Lom
- Narrated by: Douglas Fairbanks Jr.
- Cinematography: Erwin Hillier
- Edited by: Gordon Pilkington
- Music by: Mátyás Seiber
- Production companies: Associated Dragon Films; Associated British Picture Corporation
- Distributed by: Associated British-Pathé(UK); Warner Bros. Pictures (US)
- Release dates: 16 January 1958; (premiere, London)
- Running time: 87 minutes
- Countries: United Kingdom; United States
- Language: English

Chase a Crooked Shadow (a.k.a. Sleep No More) is a 1958 British suspense film directed by Michael Anderson and starring Richard Todd, Anne Baxter and Herbert Lom. It was the first film produced by Associated Dragon Films, a business venture of Douglas Fairbanks Jr.

== Plot ==
In her family's Spanish villa, Kimberly Prescott, a young South African heiress of a diamond company, is grieving her father's recent suicide. She is taken aback by the arrival of a man claiming to be her brother, Ward, believed to have died in a car accident a year earlier. Kimberly suspects the man may be after her inheritance. She calls the local authorities, and police chief Vargas arrives, but the man has a driving licence, passport and letter of credit from a prestigious bank, all in the name of Ward Prescott. Even two of Kimberly's personal photos of Ward look like the man she claims is an impostor. Vargas leaves, believing Kim to be unstable.

The next day Kim is awoken by a strange woman who says she is Mrs Whitman, a friend of Ward's. Kim's maid has been sent away, and Ward's butler installed in her place. Kim attempts to contact Uncle Chan who has long known both her and her brother, but when Chan arrives he greets the man familiarly.

Ward later confronts Kim, accusing her of having stolen a million pound diamond cache from their late father's company's vault after the venture had been taken over by another company. He has a record of flights she took that leave a gap in her itinerary. Eventually Kim admits she took the diamonds to Tangiers and deposited them there. Ward and Mrs Whitman then get her to sign an introduction for Ward as her agent to the bank in Tangiers.

Kim flees to the beach house below the main villa. Someone follows her, whom she shoots and almost kills with a spear gun. It is Vargas. She shows him a will that Mrs Whitman had tried to force her to sign, and he starts to believe her story. He suggests she provide him with something holding Ward's fingerprints. She flirts with Ward while drinking brandy and leaves his glass out, which Vargas collects. Kim goes to the beach house and retrieves a hidden metal box. She sneaks back up to the villa and tries to leave, but Uncle Chan blocks her path.

The box contains the missing diamonds. Her three captors demand she sign the will. Ward suggests they go for a swim, intimating she will be drowned. Kim runs to the main house. Vargas arrives, and she begs him to save her from murder. Instead, he clears Ward of being an impostor, saying his fingerprints are a match for her brother. Knowing the man is not her brother, Kim stridently asserts that her brother has to be dead "because I killed him". She says she cut the brakes on his car and watched him drive off a cliff. Upon her confession it is revealed that "Ward" and Mrs Whitman are undercover police sent to find the missing diamonds and discover the truth behind the real Ward's death, with Vargas only being taken into their confidence after the fingerprint gambit forced their hand.

== Cast ==
- Richard Todd as Ward McKenzie Prescott Jr.
- Anne Baxter as Kimberley Prescott
- Herbert Lom as Inspector Vargas
- Faith Brook as Elaine Whitman
- Alexander Knox as Chandler Bridson
- Alan Tilvern as Carlos
- Thelma D'Aguilar as Maria

== Production ==
The film was originally known as The Prescott Affair. The story was optioned by Dragon Films which belonged to heiress Pamela Woolworth (niece of F.W. Woolworth) and Douglas Fairbanks Jr., who had made The Silken Affair (1956). Dragon developed the story and script, assigning it to TV writers David Osborn and Charles Sinclair. Roy Kellino was originally attached to produce and direct. David Niven was the first male star announced.

Dragon obtained finance from the Associated British Picture Corporation (ABPC) who had a releasing arrangement with Warner Bros. Pictures. The production company became known as Associated Dragon. ABPC's involvement saw director Michael Anderson and star Richard Todd join the project. The title was changed to Sleep No More, then Chase a Crooked Shadow and filming started in May 1957. Fairbanks Jr. said he was pressured to make a cameo in the film but refused. Some of the exteriors were shot in Tamariu and Palamos on the Costa Brava. The guitar music that forms a significant part of the soundtrack is played by Julian Bream.

Todd says when the filmmakers saw a preview "we were all thrilled with it. Here we knew we had a really good picture."

== Critical reception ==
The Monthly Film Bulletin wrote: "This virtuoso study in suspense only serves to show how remarkable is Hitchcock's gift of clothing his own often absurd fantasies in the incidentals of reality which give them "a peculiar credibility. This film has no such gift. Michael Anderson's direction is often astonishingly clever in its tricky way; but the tour de force is too consistently maintained. There are no anticlimaxes to relieve and at the same time to point up the tension. Nor is the treatment of the characters subtle enough to sustain the sudden reversals of sympathy which the plot demands. Anne Baxter and Faith Brook are, to say the least, spirited; Richard Todd is plumply efficient."

Bosley Crowther in his review for The New York Times considered the plot as overly complex and torturous but that the melodrama was "nothing amazing, and neither is this film. It's just a moderately well-done program picture, endowed with a couple of standard thrills".

Leonard Maltin awarded the film three out of four stars, calling it an "exciting, Hitchcock-like melodrama".

In British Sound Films David Quinlan calls the film a "suspensful hair-raising thriller".

Leslie Halliwell opined: "Tricksy, lightly controlled suspense melodrama with a perfectly fair surprise ending. Handling equivocal but competent."

The Radio Times Guide to Films gave the film 3/5 stars, writing: "Coming off the back of The Dam Busters (1955), 1984 (1956) and Around the World in 80 Days (1956), director Michael Anderson was destined for a disappointment, but it is to his credit that this ludicrously contrived thriller not only holds the attention, but also actually manages to induce a short intake of breath at the totally unexpected dénouement. Anne Baxter gives her one of her best performances as a recuperating neurotic who is convinced long-lost brother Richard Todd is after her diamonds."

== Remakes and adaptations ==
=== Indian remakes and adaptations ===
Chase a Crooked Shadow was an inspiration for a number of movies in India such as Sesh Anka (in Bengali, 1963), its remake Puthiya Paravai (in Tamil, 1964), Dhuan (in Hindi, 1981), its remake Mayadari Maridi (Telugu, 1985) and the Malayalam-language films Rahasyam,Ithile Vannavar and Charithram (1989). Chase a Crooked Shadow was also an inspiration for the 1989 Hindi movie Khoj which was remade as Police Report (in Telugu, 1989) and Agni Sakshi (in Kannada, 1996). The climax twist of the original was used as a reference point for the Kannada language Indian movie Yarivanu (1984).

=== Other adaptations ===
The original film also served as an inspiration for the French play Piège pour un homme seul (Trap for a Lonely Man) by Robert Thomas. The play served as the source material for the TV movies Honeymoon with a Stranger (1969), One of My Wives Is Missing (1976), and Vanishing Act (1986). It was also adapted into 1990 Russian movie of the same name. The Malaysian film Misteri Dilaila (2019) is also loosely based on these films.

Alfred Shaughnessy wrote a stage adaptation of the original film, Double Cut, first staged at the Thorndike Theatre, Leatherhead in 1984, with Simon Williams and Lucy Fleming in the leads, prior to touring the UK the following year with David Griffin and Tessa Wyatt.
