= Mannan (film) =

1992 film by P. Vasu

- Theatrical release poster
- Directed by: P. Vasu
- Written by: P. Vasu
- Based on: Anuraga Aralithu
- Produced by: Prabhu
- Starring: Rajinikanth; Vijayashanti; Khushbu
- Cinematography: Ashok Kumar
- Edited by: P. Mohanraj
- Music by: Ilaiyaraaja
- Production company: Sivaji Productions
- Release date: 15 January 1992
- Running time: 153 minutes
- Country: India
- Language: Tamil

Mannan (transl. Monarch) is a 1992 Indian Tamil-language masala film written and directed by P. Vasu. The film stars Rajinikanth, Vijayashanti and Khushbu. It is a remake of the 1986 Kannada film Anuraga Aralithu. The film was released on 15 January 1992 and ran for over 25 weeks in theatres.

== Plot ==
V. Shanthi Devi, owner and CEO of Devi Industries in Madras is announced as the number one young industrialist in India. She is a rich and arrogant woman who rules her company with an iron fist. She lives with her father Viswanathan, whom she replaced five years ago as the CEO, and her maid Kannamma, as she had lost her mother 20 years ago. Krishnan, a kind-hearted mechanic working in Bombay, comes home to Madras to see his mother.

Krishnan and Shanthi Devi meet at the airport and their first meeting ends on a bitter note. Krishnan learns that his mother has paralysis. Krishnan quits his job in Bombay and decides to stay in Madras to take care of his ailing mother. His family doctor recommends Krishnan to meet a renowned businessman to get a job in Madras. Krishnan goes to meet the businessman and on the way, Viswanathan is beaten by thugs. Krishnan helps him and takes him to a hospital and discovers that Viswanathan is the businessman whom he was going to meet. Krishnan is asked to go to the factory only to discover that it belongs to Shanthi Devi. She refuses to hire Krishnan, but later due to her father's compulsion she recruits Krishnan as a senior mechanic.

Krishnan befriends Meena, Shanthi Devi's secretary. Meena, unlike her boss, is sweet and warm, and instantly falls in love with Krishnan. Once Krishnan saves Shanthi Devi from a falling structure by lifting her, but she slaps him. He returns to her room and slaps her in private. She then realises the incident and promotes him as Section chief mechanic. Later, Krishnan is elected as the union leader, defeating the office staff candidate supported by Shanthi Devi. Since they have different ideologies, Krishnan and Shanthi Devi have frequent clashes.

Meena decides to marry Krishnan and reveals it to him. Krishnan likes Meena but advises Meena to discuss it with his mother first. Shanthi Devi, however, decides to marry Krishnan, to take revenge on him. She somehow convinces Krishnan's mother to get her married and Krishnan obliges his mother. Krishnan's mother is not aware of Shanthi Devi's plan. Shanthi Devi expects Krishnan to stay at home post marriage but her plan fails as Krishnan continues as the union leader even after marriage.

Shanthi Devi changes a policy in her company which agitates the workers and they go on strike, headed by Krishnan. Viswanathan realises that his company's image is at stake and takes over as the chairman. Shanthi Devi is angered by this move and begins destroying her house, humiliated at having lost to Krishnan. Krishnan's mother learns of their bitter relationship and, despite recovering from paralysis, immediately dies of guilt. An assassination attempt is made on Shanthi Devi by her business rival Sathish, but Krishnan kills him and saves her and ultimately, she realises her mistake. Meena is later appointed as the new CEO, and Shanthi Devi remains a housewife.

== Cast ==
- Rajinikanth as Krishnan
- Vijayashanti as Shanthi Devi
- Khushbu as Meena
- Manorama as Azhagi
- Visu as Viswanathan
- Goundamani as Muthu
- Pandari Bai as Parvathi
- V. K. Ramasamy as Sadhasivam
- Prathapachandran as Raghavan
- Sharat Saxena as Sathish
- Uday Prakash as Prakash
- Ennathe Kannaiah as Worker
- Prabhu as Prabhu (guest appearance)
- P. Vasu (guest appearance)

== Production ==
Mannan is a remake of the 1986 Kannada film Anuraga Aralithu, which in turn was based on the novel Anuragada Anthapura by H. G. Radhadevi. Pandari Bai reprised her role from Anuraga Aralithu. Vijayashanti received ₹40 lakh (equivalent to ₹3.1 crore or US$320,000 in 2023) for acting in the film, and Rajinikanth was paid ₹9 million (equivalent to ₹69 million or US$720,000 in 2023). When Goundamani was approached, he asked a figure higher than Rajinikanth; he ultimately received ₹7.5 million (equivalent to ₹58 million or US$600,000 in 2023). The scene where their characters struggle to buy tickets at a cinema theatre was inspired from director P. Vasu's real-life experience at Shanti Theatre. During the filming of another scene where Goundamani's character says "Naan inga vandhu ukaandhadhe thappu" (I made a huge mistake by sitting next to him), in reference to Rajinikanth's character, Rajinikanth could not control his laughter, resulting in the scene going through 21 retakes; it was ultimately filmed with Rajinikanth's mouth covered. Many scenes were shot in Ooty.

== Themes ==
Writing for PopMatters, Kumuthan Maderya said, "At the heart of Mannan is the conceit that domestic violence, physical and emotional, is a civil war of attrition that inevitably hemorrhages both parties". He noted it was more similar to the 1976 Tamil film Kanavan Manaivi than Anuraga Aralithu. In a separate article for the same website, Ranjani Krishnakumar viewed it differently from Kumuthan Maderya, as "a fight between a woman in power and a man of the people, who is reluctant to take power into his own hands, but wants to steer his people towards whom he believes deserves that power, which certainly isn't her". The company where Rajinikanth's character initially works is named Ramoji Rao Ranoji Rao Shivaji Rao Jijabai Pvt Ltd., using the names of Rajinikanth's parents Ramoji Rao and Jijabai, as well as his birth name Shivaji Rao.

== Music ==
The soundtrack was composed by Ilaiyaraaja and lyrics were written by Vaalee. Rajinikanth made his debut in playback singing with this film, through the song "Adikkuthu Kuliru". The song "Amma Endru" is set in Kalyani raga. The song become a frequent Mother's Day special song in Tamil Nadu. The song's lyrics were engraved in an Ayyappan temple located in Tiruchirappalli. The same song was sung by Tamil Nadu governor R. N. Ravi in a Mother's Day function celebration in 2023.

Track listing
No.	Title	Singer(s)	Length
1.	"Rajathi Raja"	Swarnalatha, S. P. Balasubrahmanyam	5:00
2.	"Sandi Raaniye"	S. P. Balasubrahmanyam	2:02
3.	"Adikuthu Kuliru"	S. Janaki, Rajinikanth	5:16
4.	"Amma Endru"	K. J. Yesudas	4:54
5.	"Kumthalakadi"	S. P. Balasubrahmanyam	5:05
6.	"Mannar Mannaney"	S. Janaki, S. P. Balasubrahmanyam	2:42
Total length:			24:59

== Release and reception ==
Mannan was released on 15 January 1992, during the Pongal holiday. Sundarji of Kalki felt the story and visuals were not fit for Rajinikanth, and Vijayashanti's rage was a negative, bringing her performance down a certain amount. The Indian Express felt the film follows the beaten track but praised Ashok Kumar's cinematography and technical values. The film ran for over 25 weeks in theatres, and Yesudas won the Tamil Nadu State Film Award for Best Male Playback Singer.

== Bibliography ==
- Ramachandran, Naman (2014) [2012]. Rajinikanth: The Definitive Biography. New Delhi: Penguin Books. ISBN 978-0-14-342111-5.
