= En Thamizh En Makkal =

- Theatrical release poster
- Directed by: Santhana Bharathi
- Screenplay by: Vaali
- Story by: Ananthu
- Produced by: Sivaji Ganesan
- Starring: Sivaji Ganesan; Vadivukkarasi; Nizhalgal Ravi; Chinni Jayanth; Major Sundarrajan
- Cinematography: A. Suresh Kumar
- Music by: Gangai Amaran
- Production company: Sivaji Productions
- Release date: 2 September 1988
- Country: India
- Language: Tamil

En Thamizh En Makkal (transl. My Tamil, My People) is a 1988 Indian Tamil-language political drama film directed by Santhana Bharathi and produced by Sivaji Ganesan. The film stars Ganesan, Vadivukkarasi, Nizhalgal Ravi Chinni Jayanth and Major Sundarrajan. It was released on 2 September 1988.

== Cast ==
- Sivaji Ganesan
- Vadivukkarasi
- Nizhalgal Ravi
- Pallavi
- Chinni Jayanth
- Major Sundarrajan
- S. S. Chandran
- Pandu
- Vijayakumar
- V. K. Ramasamy

== Soundtrack ==
Soundtrack was composed by Gangai Amaran.

Track listing
No.	Title	Singer(s)	Length
1.	"Aarambichu"	Malaysia Vasudevan, K. S. Chithra
2.	"Vaangiya Sudhanthiram"	Malaysia Vasudevan
3.	"Papparappa"	Vani Jairam
4.	"Kurinji Malar"	Malaysia Vasudevan

== Reception ==
N. Krishnaswamy of The Indian Express wrote, "care has been taken to see that narrative does not lose its dramatic interest and go against the narrative grain of Tamil cinema". Jayamanmadhan of Kalki dismissed the film as Ganesan seeking publicity for his political party.
