= Thirisoolam =

1979 film by K. Vijayan

- Directed by: K. Vijayan
- Written by: A. L. Narayanan (dialogues)
- Story by: M. D. Sundar
- Based on: Shankar Guru (1978) by V. Somashekhar
- Produced by: Santhi Narayansamy, T. Manohar
- Starring: Sivaji Ganesan; K. R. Vijaya; Sripriya; Reena
- Cinematography: K. S. Prasad; T. S. Vinayagam
- Edited by: B. Kanthasamy
- Music by: M. S. Viswanathan
- Production company: Sivaji Productions
- Release date: 27 January 1979
- Running time: 167 minutes
- Country: India
- Language: Tamil

Thirisoolam (transl. Trident) is a 1979 Indian Tamil-language film directed by K. Vijayan. The film has Sivaji Ganesan playing triple roles. It is a remake of the Kannada film Shankar Guru (1978). The film was released on 27 January 1979 and turned out to be a silver jubilee hit, running for over 175 days in theatres eventually becoming the highest grossing Tamil film at the time of its release.

== Plot ==
Rajasekaran is an upright businessman whose associates are involved in shady deals. During an argument over such a deal, a scuffle ensues, and Rajasekharan accidentally shoots one of his associates dead. Fleeing from the police, he loses contact with his pregnant wife, Sumathi.

Many years later, Sumathi is now living with her son Shankar in Delhi, while Rajasekaran is a rich estate owner in Kashmir. Rajasekaran's niece Nalini encounters Shankar in Delhi and recommends him to manage her uncle's estate in Kashmir. Also arriving in Kashmir for a romantic quest with a rich girl named Malathy is Guru, a lookalike of Shankar, who is later revealed as his twin brother. Through Shankar, Rajasekaran finally manages to establish contact with his long-lost wife, Sumathi and is overwhelmed with joy.

However, before he can meet Sumathi, trouble arrives in the form of Rajasekaran's erstwhile crooked partners headed by M. N. Nambiar, who are after a valuable necklace stolen from a temple in Delhi, which they believe is now in Rajasekaran's possession. The partners kidnap Sumathi and imprison and torture Rajasekaran, and it is up to Shankar and Guru to rescue and re-unite their father and mother.

== Cast ==
- Sivaji Ganesan as Rajashekar, Shankar & Gurumoorthy
- K. R. Vijaya as Sumathi
- Sripriya as Malathi
- Reena as Nalini
- M. N. Nambiar as Chakravarthi
- Major Sundarrajan as Govindasamy
- Thengai Srinivasan as Ganesh
- V. K. Ramasamy as Ramanathan
- S. V. Ramadas as Premkumar
- Jai Ganesh as Dhivakar
- Pushpalatha as Dr. Prema

== Production ==
Thirisoolam was promoted as Ganesan's 200th film in a leading role. Ganesan's home, Annai Illam, features in the film.

== Soundtrack ==
The music was composed by M. S. Viswanathan, with lyrics by Kannadasan.

Song	Singers	Length
"Malar Kodutthen"	T. M. Soundararajan	04:10
"Kadhal Rani Katti Kidakae"	S. P. Balasubrahmanyam	05:02
"En Raajathi"	S. P. Balasubrahmanyam	04:27
"Irandu Kaigal"	K. J. Yesudas, S. P. Balasubrahmanyam	04:07
"Thirumaalin Thirumaarbil"	K. J. Yesudas, Vani Jairam	05:10

== Reception ==
P. S. M. of Kalki praised Ganesan's performance, but not the film itself. Naagai Dharuman of Anna called it a milestone achievement in Ganesan's career, while Alibaba called triple action of Ganesan as full satisfaction for his fans and Kalkandu called a film for masses where logic should not be questioned. It was a silver jubilee hit.

== Legacy ==
Thirisoolam is included alongside other Ganesan-starring films in the compilation DVD 8th Ulaga Adhisayam Sivaji.
