= Prabhu (actor) =

Indian actor and film producer (born 1956)

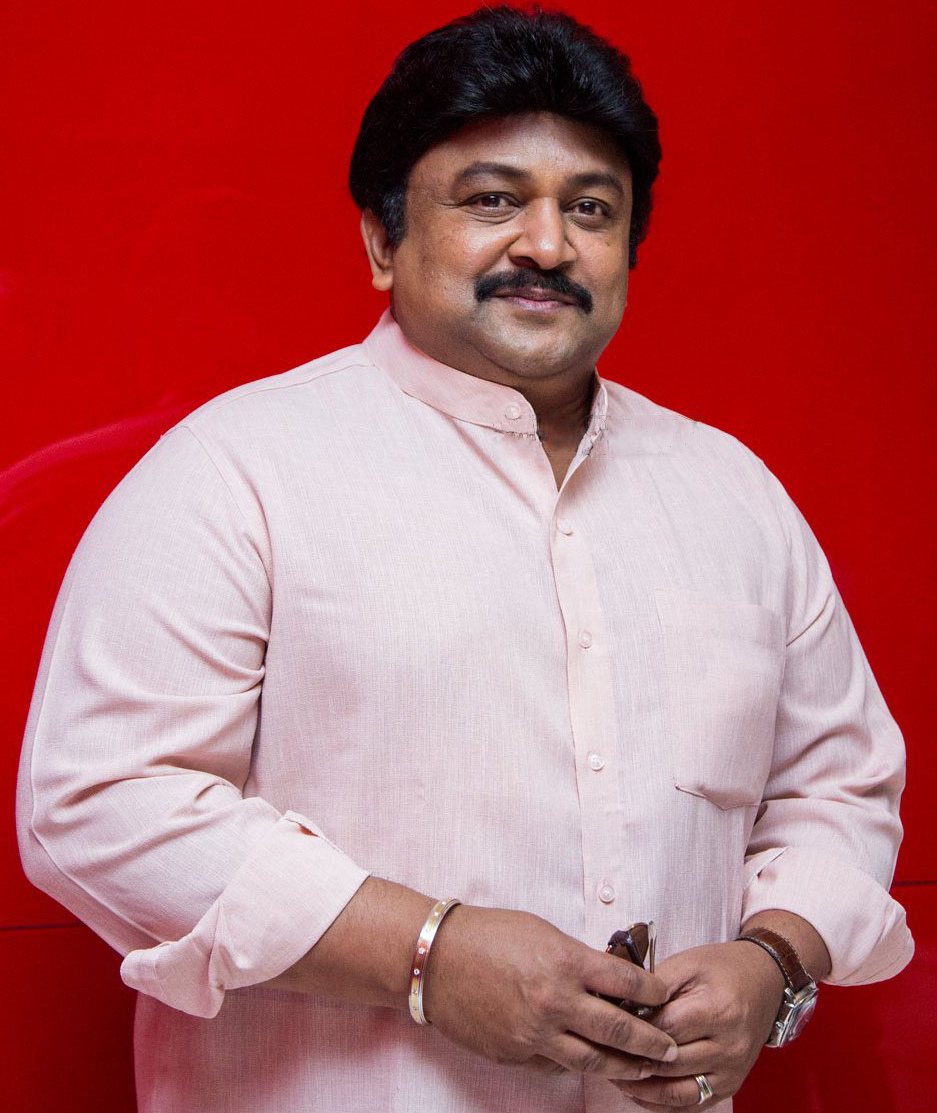
- Prabhu at Wagah audio launch event
- Born: Prabhu Ganesan; 27 December 1956 (age 69); Chennai, Tamil Nadu, India
- Education: Loyola College, Chennai
- Occupations: Actor, film producer
- Years active: 1982–present
- Spouse: Punitha (m. 1982)
- Children: 2 including Vikram Prabhu
- Parent(s): Sivaji Ganesan (father); Kamala (mother)
- Relatives: Ramkumar Ganesan (brother); Dushyanth Ramkumar (nephew); Adhik Ravichandran (son-in-law)

Prabhu Ganesan (born 27 December 1956), known professionally as Prabhu, is an Indian actor and film producer who predominantly works in Tamil cinema. He is the youngest son of veteran actor Sivaji Ganesan. Prabhu was one of the leading actors in Tamil cinema in the 80s and 90s. He is popularly known as Ilaya Thilagam. He has worked in more than 220 films in lead and supporting roles in Tamil, Telugu, Malayalam and Kannada films.

After making his debut in Sangili (1982), Prabhu played various leading and supporting roles, earning the Best Actor award recognition by the Tamil Nadu State for his portrayal in Chinna Thambi (1991).

== Early life ==
After leaving Bishop Cotton Boys' School in Bangalore, Prabhu got involved in film production as an executive producer and worked alongside his uncle and mentor V. C. Shanmugam, who insisted that Prabhu learn the film making process in a disciplined way, giving him general tasks such as pulling up chairs for artistes. Before entering into acting in cinema, he was working for the films produced by Sivaji Productions notably his father's 200th film Thirisoolam, which was the highest-grossing Tamil film at the time of its release.

== Career ==
Prabhu's father, actor Mr.Sivaji Ganesan, had initially expressed reluctance in allowing Prabhu to pursue an acting career, but through his work in the industry, he began to receive offers from film-makers to feature in their films.

He subsequently made his acting debut in C. V. Rajendran's Sangili (1982), a remake of the Hindi film Kalicharan, where he was cast in a supporting role. By the time Sangili released, Prabhu was working on six films, including Charuhasan's Pudhiya Sangamam and Gangai Amaren's romantic film Kozhi Koovuthu, which became his first commercially successful venture.

Initially, Prabhu acted in several films with his father Sivaji Ganesan, most of which were commercially successful. In 1983 Prabhu co-starred with Sivaji Ganesan in films such as Neethibathi and Sandhippu, which became huge hits and became silver jubilee films. After featuring in about thirty films, including nineteen with his father, Prabhu's career graph registered a drop and he began to reconsider the type of films he had signed.

Prabhu opted against featuring in films co-starring his father and consciously began to choose subjects rather than accept as many offers as possible. Among the first films he signed after taking the break included G. M. Kumar's Aruvadai Naal (1986) and Manivannan's Paalaivana Rojakkal, alongside Sathyaraj, both proving successful. Subsequently, the following period saw a series of commercial successes in 1988 for the actor, notably S. P. Muthuraman's Guru Sishyan with Rajinikanth, Mani Ratnam's Agni Natchathiram with Karthik and P. Vasu's family drama En Thangachi Padichava. The success of the latter film prompted more successful collaborations in the same genre between Prabhu and Vasu with Chinna Thambi (1991) and Senthamizh Pattu (1992) also receiving a similar reception, with the actor earning the Best Actor award recognition by the Tamil Nadu state.

He subsequently worked in his hundredth film R. V. Udayakumar's Rajakumaran, before portraying well received roles in K. Balachander's romantic film Duet (1994) and Priyadarshan's Malayalam period film Kaalapani (1996) alongside Mohanlal. Prabhu went through another barren spell in the late 1990s, when several films after the success of Panchalankurichi failed to do well, prompting another image change away from his village do-gooder roles.

Prabhu has given opportunity to more than 30 debutant directors, including Seeman, R. V. Udayakumar, Gangai Amaran, Pandiarajan, Raj Kapoor, G. M. Kumar, Panchu Arunachalam, Velu Prabhakaran, K. Subash, Sivachandran, R. K. Kalaimani and Cheyyar Ravi.

Moving away from action films, Prabhu selected scripts which would appeal to family audiences in the early 2000s and collaborated with film-makers including Rama Narayanan and T. P. Gajendran, working in a series of "minimum guarantee" return films.

Prabhu then made another career change and began accepting film offers in which he would play a supporting rather than the leading role and featured alongside Kamal Haasan and then Rajinikanth in two big budget ventures Vasool Raja MBBS (2004) and his home production Chandramukhi (2005). Since then, he has gained acclaim portraying characters including a caring guardian in Unakkum Enakkum, Thaamirabharani and Ayan, while he has also been seen in detective roles in action films, notably Billa (2007) and then Kanthaswamy (2009). He has also played other acclaimed supporting roles in Mani Ratnam's Raavanan (2010) and Aishwarya Dhanush's 3 (2012), while he has ventured into playing similar roles in Telugu, Kannada and Malayalam films. In 2016, Prabhu featured in his 200th film, the romantic comedy Meen Kuzhambum Mann Paanaiyum produced by his nephew, Dushyanth Ramkumar.

The director Sakthi Chidambaram has attempted a sequel Charlie Chaplin 2 (2019) sixteen years later which has nothing in common with the original including comedy excepting for the two male leads.

He play a pivotal role in the Malayalam historical period drama film Marakkar: Lion of the Arabian Sea (2021). Mohanlal and Prabhu team up after 22 years. The two actors had last acted together in the critically acclaimed Kaalapani, released in 1996. He takes on the role of Periya Velar Boothi Vikramakesari in Mani Ratnam’s two-part Ponniyin Selvan: I (2022) and Ponniyin Selvan: II (2023).

== Personal life ==
Prabhu was born to veteran actor Sivaji Ganesan and Kamala on 27 December 1956. His elder brother Ramkumar is a film producer and he has two sisters Shanthi and Thenmozhi.

In 1979, a petition was filed against Prabhu, accusing him of attempting to shoot himself, but the Madras High Court dismissed this petition. Prabhu himself denied a suicide attempt, saying he was cleaning his father's gun when he was injured; he was found writhing in pain after a gunshot was heard, although no serious injury happened.

Prabhu is married to Punitha in 1982 and has two children Vikram Prabhu, and Aishwarya Prabhu. Vikram Prabhu is also an actor who made his acting debut in the 2012 film Kumki.

== Awards ==
=== Cinema Express Awards ===
| Year | Film(s) | Category | Outcome |
|---|---|---|---|
| 1988 | Manasukkul Mathappu | Best Actor | Won |

=== Filmfare Awards South ===
Prabhu was nominated six times at the Filmfare Awards South

| Year | Film(s) | Category | Outcome |
|---|---|---|---|
| 1986 | Aruvadai Naal | Best Actor | Nominated |
| 1988 | Agni Natchathiram | Best Actor | Nominated |
| 1991 | Chinna Thambi | Best Actor | Nominated |
| 1994 | Duet | Best Actor | Nominated |
| 2002 | Charlie Chaplin | Best Actor | Nominated |
| 2005 | Chandramukhi | Best Film | Nominated |
| 2009 | Ayan | Best Supporting Actor | Nominated |

=== Tamil Nadu State Film Awards ===
| Year | Film(s) | Category | Outcome |
|---|---|---|---|
| 1991 | Chinna Thambi | Best Actor | Won |
| 2002 | Charlie Chaplin | Special Prize | Won |
| 2005 | Chandramukhi | Best Film | Won |
