= Sivaji Productions =

Indian film distribution and production company

- Type: Film production Film distribution
- Industry: Entertainment, Software
- Founded: 1956
- Defunct: 2010
- Headquarters: Chennai, India
- Key people: Ramkumar Ganesan; Prabhu
- Products: Motion pictures (Tamil); Motion pictures (Hindi)

Sivaji Productions is an Indian film production and distribution company based in Chennai. Established in 1956, it was involved mainly in Tamil and Hindi-language films until 2010.

== History ==
Sivaji Productions company is owned by Prabhu and his brother Ramkumar Ganesan. It is named after their father, the thespian Sivaji Ganesan. Notable films released under their banner includes Puthiya Paravai, Vietnam Veedu, Thanga Pathakkam, Thirisoolam, Aruvadai Naal, Vetri Vizha, Mannan, Chandramukhi and Aasal.

Sivaji Productions was started in 1956 by Dr. Sivaji Ganesan and his brother Sri V.C. Shanmugam. It was first started as a distribution company and distributed many of Dr. Sivaji's movies. In 1958, Sivaji Productions co-produced its first film Amardeepam which was a Hindi remake of Amardeep. Its first solo production was Puthiya Paravai in 1964 with Dr. Sivaji in the lead role.

Since then, Sivaji Productions has produced about 18 films till date.

After Sri V.C. Shanmugam's death in 1986, Dr. Sivaji's son Mr. G.Ramkumar took over Sivaji Productions.

Sivaji Productions has also ventured into the production of television serials. It has produced two serials, Kokila engey Pogirral in Tamil and Seethama Maeyamma in Telugu and is currently producing a Tamil serial called Thavam for Kalaingar TV.

During the success meet of the P. Vasu-directed Mannan (1992), Rajinikanth announced that he would act in Sivaji Productions' 50th film. However, following their 49th film Rajakumaran, Sivaji Productions went on hiatus for 12 years. In September 2004, Rajinikanth was impressed with Vasu's Kannada film Apthamitra (2004) and wanted to remake it in Tamil with Sivaji Productions producing. The remake, titled Chandramukhi, became Sivaji Productions' 50th film. The film received positive reviews from critics and became a successful venture at the box-office.

Their next project was initially announced with Gautham Vasudev Menon as director. However, the film's production failed to take off, with repeated dates being announced by the directors for the film's first schedule throughout 2009. Subsequently, Menon was removed from the project by the producers due to the film's inactivity, with directors Dharani, Vishnuvardhan and Saran leading the race to take over.

In January 2009, the film was reannounced as Asal by Prabhu and the story was subsequently changed with Saran being signed up as the film's director. The film received negative reviews from critics and became a failure at box-office.

== Filmography ==
Films

Year	Film	Language	Director	Notes
1958	Amar Deep	Hindi	T. Prakash Rao	Co Production with Venus Pictures
1958	Uthama Puthiran	Tamil	T. Prakash Rao	Distributed in Madras Circuit
1962	Rakhi	Hindi	A. Bhimsingh	Co Production with Prabhuram Pictures
1963	Kunkhumam	Tamil	Krishnan–Panju	Distributed by Sivaji Productions
1964	Puthiya Paravai	Tamil	Dada Mirasi	Distributed by Sivaji Productions
1965	Santhi	Tamil	A. Bhimsingh	Distributed by Sivaji Productions
1969	Deiva Magan	Tamil	A. C. Tirulokchandar	Distributed by Sivaji Productions
1969	Anbalippu	Tamil	A. C. Tirulokchandar	Distributed by Sivaji Productions
1970	Vietnam Veedu	Tamil	P. Madhavan	
1974	Thanga Pathakkam	Tamil	P. Madhavan	
1977	Annan Oru Koyil	Tamil	K. Vijayan	
1979	Thirisoolam	Tamil	K. Vijayan	
1980	Ratha Paasam	Tamil	K. Vijayan	
1982	Vaa Kanna Vaa	Tamil	D. Yoganand	
1983	Sandhippu	Tamil	C. V. Rajendran	
1985	Needhiyin Nizhal	Tamil	Bharathi-Vasu	
1986	Anandha Kanneer	Tamil	K. Vijayan	
1986	Aruvadai Naal	Tamil	G. M. Kumar	
1987	Anand	Tamil	C. V. Rajendran	
1988	En Thamizh En Makkal	Tamil	Santhana Bharathi	
1989	Vetri Vizha	Tamil	Pratap Pothan	
1990	My Dear Marthandan	Tamil	Pratap Pothan	
1991	Thalattu Ketkuthamma	Tamil	Rajkapoor	
1992	Mannan	Tamil	P.Vasu	
1993	Kalaignan	Tamil	G. B. Vijay	
1994	Rajakumaran	Tamil	R. V. Udayakumar	
2005	Chandramukhi	Tamil	P.Vasu	
2007	Delhii Heights	Hindi	Anand Kumar	
2010	Aasal	Tamil	Saran	

Television

- Kokila Enge Pogiraal (Sun TV)
- Thavam (Kalaignar TV)
