= Bavagaru Bagunnara =

1998 film by Jayanth C. Paranjee

- Theatrical release poster
- Directed by: Jayanth C. Paranjee
- Written by: Jayanth C. Paranjee; Paruchuri Brothers
- Produced by: Nagendra Babu
- Starring: Chiranjeevi; Srihari; Rambha; Paresh Rawal; Rachana Banerjee
- Cinematography: K. Datthu
- Edited by: Marthand K. Venkatesh
- Music by: Mani Sharma
- Production company: Anjana Productions
- Distributed by: Geetha Arts
- Release date: 9 April 1998
- Country: India
- Language: Telugu

Bavagaru Bagunnara (transl. Brother-in-law, how are you?) is a 1998 Indian Telugu-language romantic comedy drama film directed by Jayanth C. Paranjee and produced by Nagendra Babu under Anjana Productions banner. The film stars Chiranjeevi, Rambha, and Rachana, with a supporting cast including Paresh Rawal, Kota Srinivasa Rao, Srihari, and Brahmanandam. The film follows Raju, a restaurant owner in New Zealand, who becomes involved in a series of comedic and emotional situations after offering assistance to a pregnant woman, Sandhya. The movie is loosely inspired from the Hollywood movie A Walk in the Clouds.

Released on 9 April 1998, the film became a major commercial success. The film's soundtrack, composed by Mani Sharma, was popular, with the track "Aunty Koothura" becoming a major hit. The film was also praised for its visually appealing scenes, particularly those shot in New Zealand, and for its stunts, including a bungee jump performed by Chiranjeevi, which became one of the film's highlights. Bavagaru Bagunnara was later remade in Hindi as Kunwara (2000) and in Bangladesh as Jamai Shashur (2003).

== Plot ==
The film follows the story of Raju, a man who splits his time between New Zealand, where he owns a restaurant, and India, where he runs an orphanage in his sister’s name. Swapna, a student in New Zealand staying with her uncle, initially confronts Raju, believing he is responsible for beating her friend. However, upon learning that Raju was not at fault, she falls in love with him.

The narrative shifts to India, where Raju travels to manage the orphanage. There, he encounters Sandhya, a pregnant woman, who is on the verge of suicide after a failed love affair. Raju offers to pose as her husband until the child is born, after which he would leave her so she can live peacefully as a deserted wife. They travel to her village, where Sandhya’s father, Rao Bahadur Rajendra Prasad, initially resists but eventually agrees to the plan under pressure from family members.

The plot takes a dramatic turn when Swapna arrives in India and discovers that Raju is married to Sandhya, making him her brother-in-law. Raju’s attempts to explain the situation fail to convince her. Meanwhile, Raju becomes involved in a dispute over the ownership of a lake between Sandhya’s village and a neighboring one. He wins a race that settles the ownership in favour of Sandhya’s village. Pleased with the outcome, Sandhya’s father accepts Raju as his son-in-law and plans their marriage.

As Swapna learns the truth, she struggles with her emotions. Sandhya, overwhelmed by the situation, attempts suicide once more, but Raju intervenes again. He later learns that Sandhya’s lover, who had been captured by the head of the neighboring village and forced to marry his daughter, is alive. Raju rescues him, and the lovers are reunited and married.

== Cast ==
- Chiranjeevi as Raju
- Rambha as Swapna (voice dubbed by Roja Ramani)
- Paresh Rawal as Rao Bahadur Rajendra Prasad (voice dubbed by P. Ravi Shankar)
- Rachana Banerjee as Sandhya (voice dubbed by Shilpa)
- Kota Srinivasa Rao as Pedda Basavaraju
- Kaikala Satyanarayana as Rao Bahadur Visweswara Rao
- Sowcar Janaki as Swapna's grandmother
- Brahmanandam as Gopal
- Jaya Prakash Reddy
- Srihari as Chinna Kankaraju
- Achyuth as Venkat, Sandhya's lover
- Sudha as Bhuvaneshwari
- Deepa Raju
- M. S. Narayana as a doctor
- Nagendra Babu (special appearance in the song "Sorry Sorry")
- M. Shailaja as Raju's elder sister (portrait appearance)

== Production ==
=== Development ===
Following the commercial failures of Big Boss (1995) and Rikshavodu (1995), Chiranjeevi regained box-office success with films such as Hitler (1997) and Master (1997). These films featured him in serious roles, but fans were eager for a shift toward lighter, more entertaining performances that highlighted his comic timing, dance, and fight sequences. During this period, director Jayanth C. Paranjee, who had recently achieved success with his debut film Premichukundam Raa (1997), was given the opportunity to collaborate with Chiranjeevi for his second film.

The core premise of Baavagaru Bagunnara was inspired by the American film A Walk in the Clouds (1995). While the original was a serious drama, the Telugu adaptation incorporated significant comedic elements, primarily through the character portrayed by Rambha. Jayanth worked with the Paruchuri brothers to adapt and develop the story into a romantic comedy-drama. The film was produced by Naga Babu under his Anjana Productions banner.

The narrative was designed to balance comedy and emotional depth. Key scenes featuring Chiranjeevi, Rambha, and Brahmanandam in New Zealand provided ample comic relief. Upon the characters' return to India, the humour continued through interactions between Chiranjeevi and Rambha, while supporting actors such as Kota Srinivasa Rao and Srihari added to the comedic appeal. The climax of the film, featuring a horse race sequence, was crafted to resonate with mass audiences.

=== Filming ===
Key portions of the film were shot in New Zealand, showcasing picturesque locations. Director Jayanth C. Paranjee noted that, unlike his earlier films, Bavagaru Bagunnara introduced Chiranjeevi with a song sequence instead of an action scene. Chiranjeevi performed a bungee jump for a song which became a highlight.

Bhagyashree was initially considered for the role that was ultimately played by Rachana.

== Music ==
The music for this film was composed by Mani Sharma. The audio was a huge hit and all the songs were chartbusters. The track "Aunty Koothura", sung by S. P. Balasubrahmanyam and K. S. Chitra was a massive hit among the masses and was an instant chartbuster.

Bavagaru Bagunnara!

Soundtrack album by Mani Sharma
- Released: 9 April 1998
- Recorded: 1998
- Genre: Soundtrack
- Length: 24:56
- Label: Aditya Music
- Producer: Mani Sharma

Mani Sharma chronology
Preminchukundam Raa (1997)	Bavagaru Bagunnara! (1998)	Ganesh (1998)

Track-List
No.	Title	Lyrics	Singer(s)	Length
1.	"Aunty Koothura"	Chandrabose	S. P. Balasubrahmanyam, K. S. Chitra	6:01
2.	"Chalnedo Gaadi"	Chandrabose	Mano	4:48
3.	"Maattekki Thooge"	Sirivennela Seetharama Sastry	S. P. Balasubrahmanyam, Febi	5:16
4.	"Navami Dasami"	Chandrabose	Hariharan, Sujatha	4:26
5.	"Sorry Sorry"	Chandrabose	Mano, Sujatha	4:25
Total length:				24:56

== Reception ==
Griddaluru Gopalrao of Zamin Ryot writing his review on 24 April 1998 has called the film "a laughing riot." Goplarao appreciated the film's story and screenplay for its novelty with particular praise for Paranjee's direction, Chiranjeevi's performance, and Sharma's soundtrack. Y Maheswara Reddy of The New Indian Express noted that it was "worth watching".

The film received attention for its action sequences, particularly a bungee jump performed by Chiranjeevi, which became a highlight. This stunt, along with his introductory scene, garnered applause from audiences. The horse race in the climax was also well-received. Additionally, Chiranjeevi's wardrobe, especially his bell-bottom pants, became a trendsetter.

Brahmanandam later included Bavagaru Bagunnara among the top 11 films of his career.
