= Kunwara =

- Directed by: David Dhawan
- Written by: Rumi Jaffery; Nagendra Babu; Yunus Sajawal
- Based on: Bavagaru Bagunnara by Jayanth C. Paranjee
- Produced by: Allu Aravind; Ramesh S. Taurani; Mukesh Udeshi
- Starring: Govinda; Urmila Matondkar
- Cinematography: Chota K. Naidu
- Edited by: Sachin Adurkar; K. Raul Kumar
- Music by: Aadesh Shrivastava
- Distributed by: Tips Industries; Geetha Arts
- Release date: 21 July 2000
- Running time: 134 min
- Country: India
- Language: Hindi
- Budget: ₹9 crore (equivalent to ₹37 crore or US$3.9 million in 2023)
- Box office: ₹19.34 crore (equivalent to ₹80 crore or US$8.3 million in 2023)

Kunwara (transl:Bachelor) is a 2000 Indian Hindi romantic comedy film directed by David Dhawan, with cinematography by Chota K. Naidu, and was released on July 21, 2000. The film stars Govinda, Urmila Matondkar, Nagma, Om Puri, Kader Khan and Johnny Lever in lead roles. The film is a remake of the Telugu film Bavagaru Bagunnara which itself was loosely inspired from the Hollywood movie A Walk in the Clouds.

== Plot ==
Raju and Urmila meet in New Zealand and fall in love. They plan to meet again very soon in India. On the way, Raju meets a woman named Sharmila, a heartbroken, suicidal pregnant woman who tells Raju of her cruel boyfriend. In order to save her respect, Raju decides to play her husband's role, and they return together to Sharmila's home, where he meets her family. However, soon enough, Raju finds out that Urmila is none other than Sharmila's sister.

== Cast ==
- Govinda as Raju Sachdeva
- Urmila Matondkar as Urmila Singh
- Nagma as Sharmila Singh
- Inder Kumar as Ajay Thakur
- Om Puri as Balraj Singh, Sharmila's father.
- Shammi as Mrs. Vishwanath Pratap Singh
- Johnny Lever as Gopal Ahuja, Raju's friend.
- Smita Jaykar as Balraj's Wife
- Mohan Joshi as Manmohan Singh, Inder's father.
- Raza Murad as Prithvi Thakur, Ajay's father.
- Kader Khan as Vishwanath Pratap Singh, Balraj's father.
- Aashif Sheikh as Inder Jaiswal
- Gavin Packard as Henchman of Prithvi Thakur
- Jeetu Verma as Henchman of Prithvi Thakur

== Music ==
Kunwara

Studio album by Aadesh Shrivastava
- Released: 2000 (India)
- Genre: Feature film soundtrack
- Label: Tips Music Films
- Producer: Aadesh Shrivastava

The soundtrack of the film contains 8 songs. The music is composed by Aadesh Shrivastava, with lyrics authored by Sameer. According to the Indian trade website Box Office India, with around 13,00,000 units sold, this film's soundtrack album was the year's fourteenth highest-selling.

#	Song	Singer(s)	Length
1	"Jab Ladka Ho Kunwara"	Sonu Nigam; Alka Yagnik	04:43
2	"Main Kunwara Aa Gaya"	Sonu Nigam	03:24
3	"Mehndi Lagake"	Kumar Sanu; Alka Yagnik	05:55
4	"Meri Chamak Chalo"	Sonu Nigam; Alka Yagnik	05:10
5	"Na Heera Na Moti"	Sonu Nigam; Hema Sardesai	05:00
6	"Sun Mere Sasure Main"	Vinod Rathod; Sonu Nigam	03:33
7	"Urmila Re Urmila"	Sonu Nigam; Alka Yagnik	04:50
8	"Yeh Ladki Jawaan"	Kumar Sanu; Alka Yagnik	04:38

== Reception ==
Kunwara received mostly negative reviews from critics, although some of the performances were received well. Sukanya Verma from Rediff.com wrote, "Don't ask any questions. Don't look for any kind of logic. Go with the flow. Otherwise, you're not ready for this David Dhawan-Govinda flick." Taran Adarsh of Bollywood Hungama criticised the film, concluding, "Kunwara has the super-successful David Dhawan-Govinda combination as its strong point, but the film pales in comparison to the hits the two have delivered earlier. The film may start off well, but it lacks a good script to sustain after the initial curiosity subsides."

== Awards ==
Kunwara was nominated for two awards in the same category at the annual Filmfare Awards:

- Filmfare Award for Best Performance in a Comic Role - Govinda
- Filmfare Award for Best Performance in a Comic Role - Johnny Lever
