= Anjana Productions =

Indian film production company

- Type: Private
- Industry: Entertainment
- Founded: Hyderabad, in 1988
- Founder: Chiranjeevi
- Headquarters: Hyderabad, Telangana, India
- Key people: Chiranjeevi; Nagendra Babu; Pawan Kalyan; Ram Charan
- Products: Films
- Subsidiaries: Konidela Production Company; Pawan Kalyan Creative Works; Pink Elephant Pictures

Anjana Productions is an Indian film production company established by Chiranjeevi and his brother Nagendra Babu in the year 1988, named after their mother Anjana Devi. It is considered as the home production company of Konidela family.

== Film production ==
=== 1988–1999 ===
Anjana productions' first film was the musical drama film Rudraveena (1988), directed by K. Balachander starring Chiranjeevi. It won the Nargis Dutt Award for Best Feature Film on National Integration. It later produced films such as Trinetrudu (1988), Mugguru Monagallu (1994) and Bavagaru Bagunnara? (1998).

=== 2000–2009 ===
In 2000, Nagendra Babu produced Kouravudu with himself playing the lead role. Later, he produced Gudumba Shankar (2004) with his younger brother Pawan Kalyan, and Stalin (2006) with Chiranjeevi in lead.

=== 2010 ===
After the failure of the 2010 romantic drama Orange, starring his nephew Ram Charan, Naga Babu is said to have incurred deep losses and announced that he will not be producing films anymore.

== Filmography ==
Year	Film name	Cast	Director
1988	Rudraveena	Chiranjeevi, Shobana	K. Balachander
1988	Trinetrudu	Chiranjeevi, Bhanupriya, Nagendra Babu	A. Kodandarami Reddy
1994	Mugguru Monagallu	Chiranjeevi, Nagma, Roja, Ramya Krishna	K. Raghavendra Rao
1998	Bavagaru Bagunnara?	Chiranjeevi, Rambha, Rachana	Jayanth C. Paranjee
2000	Kauravudu	Konidela Nagendra Babu, Ramya Krishna	Jyoti Kumar
2004	Gudumba Shankar	Pawan Kalyan, Meera Jasmine	Veera Shankar Bairisetty
2006	Stalin	Chiranjeevi, Trisha, Khushbu	A. R. Murugadoss
2010	Orange	Ram Charan, Genelia D'Souza, Shazahn Padamsee	Bhaskar
