= Trinetrudu =

1988 film by A. Kodandarami Reddy

- Theatrical release poster
- Directed by: A. Kodandarami Reddy
- Written by: A. Kodandarami Reddy
- Produced by: Chiranjeevi; Nagendra Babu
- Starring: Chiranjeevi; Bhanupriya; Kaikala Satyanarayana
- Cinematography: Lok Singh
- Edited by: M. Vellaiswamy
- Music by: Raj–Koti
- Production company: Anjana Productions
- Distributed by: Geetha Arts
- Release date: 23 September 1988
- Country: India
- Language: Telugu

Trinetrudu (transl. The three-eyed man) is a 1988 Indian Telugu-language film starring Chiranjeevi, Kaikala Satyanarayana, Ranganath and Nagendra Babu. Directed by A. Kodandarami Reddy and produced by Chiranjeevi and his brother Nagendra Babu, it was Chiranjeevi's 100th film. It is based on the 1984 film Beverly Hills Cop.

== Plot ==
Goa's beach is being exploited by a big-wig in the society, named D. D. He runs a big ashram on Goa's beach, and under this ashram's mask he runs his underworld. His underworld is the channel for drug-trafficking which cashes in upon the weakness of the youth. To investigate this ashram's dark secrets, the Indian government appoints a CBI officer who prepares a complete report on its activities but is killed by D. D.'s men. When the CBI officer never returns, the CBI gets suspicious and sends another officer, Abhimanyu.

Abhimanyu lands in Goa and meets the D. I. G. to inform him about his mission, however the Goa Police and CBI are not on good terms and the D. I. G. appoints 2 Sub-Inspectors, to follow and observe Abhimanyu. Meanwhile, Bhanu's brother becomes a drug addict and to cure him she gets him admitted into a hospital. Hospital chief Ranganath meets Abhimanyu in a strange incident. When Bhanu's brother tries to jump off the top floor of the hospital, Abhimanyu saves him and thus meets Bhanu. Being clueless about the missing CBI officer, Abhimanyu manages to enter into the ashram and exposes the secret activities carried out there. He witnesses drugs being exported in dead bodies. When Abhimanyu informs this to the D.I.G, he doesn't believe him but under pressure he raids the ashram and finds nothing, much to the shock of Abhimanyu.

D. D. becomes more self-conscious and Goa Police stop co-operating with Abhimanyu. Abhimanyu is attacked in many ways and the Goa Police get rid of him by sending him off in a ship. However, Abhimanyu escapes and returns to Goa, this time more determined to complete his mission. Abhimanyu realizes that the hospital chief is D. D.'s right hand and sets a trap in which he is killed by D. D. himself. He also succeeds in donating D. D.'s money to a homeless people's fund. D. D. gets furious and kidnaps Abhimanyu's mother. Abhimanyu informs this to the Goa Police but they don't believe him. So, Abhimanyu himself as a one-man army, attacks the ashram, destroys it, rescues his mother and marries Bhanupriya.

== Cast ==
- Chiranjeevi as Abhimanyu, a Central Bureau of Investigation officer
- Bhanupriya as Bhanu
- Kaikala Satyanarayana as Deputy inspector general (D.I.G.) of Goa Police
- Ranganath as Hospital chief
- Kulbhushan Kharbanda as D. D.
- Nagendra Babu
- Babu Antony
- Nutan Prasad as Sub-Inspector
- Annapurna as Abhimanyu's mother
- Prasad Babu as Sub-Inspector

== Soundtrack ==
All music is composed by Raj–Koti

Track list
No.	Title	Lyrics	Singer(s)	Length
1.	"He Papa"	Veturi	S. P. Balasubrahmanyam, Jojo	4:47
2.	"Ohori Nayano"	Veturi	Mano, K. S. Chithra	4:41
3.	"Lovely Lakumuki"	veturi	S. P. Balasubrahmanyam, S. Janaki	4:26
4.	"Natukottudu"	Veturi	S. P. Balasubrahmanyam, S. Janaki	4:41
5.	"Chempala Kempula"	Veturi	S. P. Balasubrahmanyam, S. Janaki	4:44
Total length:				23:22
