= Konidela–Allu family =

Indian film family

Konidela–Allu family Mega family
- Family
- Country: India
- Current region: Jubilee Hills, Hyderabad, India
- Origin: West Godavari, Andhra Pradesh, India
- Members: Allu Ramalingaiah, Chiranjeevi, Allu Aravind, Nagendra Babu, Pawan Kalyan, Ram Charan, Varun Tej, Sai Dharam Tej, Niharika, Allu Arjun, Allu Sirish, Panja Vaisshnav Tej
- Traditions: Telugu, Hindu
- Heirlooms: Geetha Arts, Anjana Productions, Pawan Kalyan Creative Works, Konidela Production Company, Allu Studios, Aha

The Konidela–Allu family is a prominent Indian film family known for their work in Telugu cinema. The family, spanning at least three generations, is involved in films, business ventures, and politics. The heads of the family have included actor Chiranjeevi and his father-in-law, the comedian Allu Ramalingaiah. The family is colloquially known as Mega family in reference to the moniker of Chiranjeevi—Mega Star.

== Overview ==
Konidela–Allu is a Telugu family with their origins in Mogalthuru and Palakollu villages of West Godavari district in the Indian state of Andhra Pradesh. They are one of the most prominent families in Indian cinema.

== Family members ==
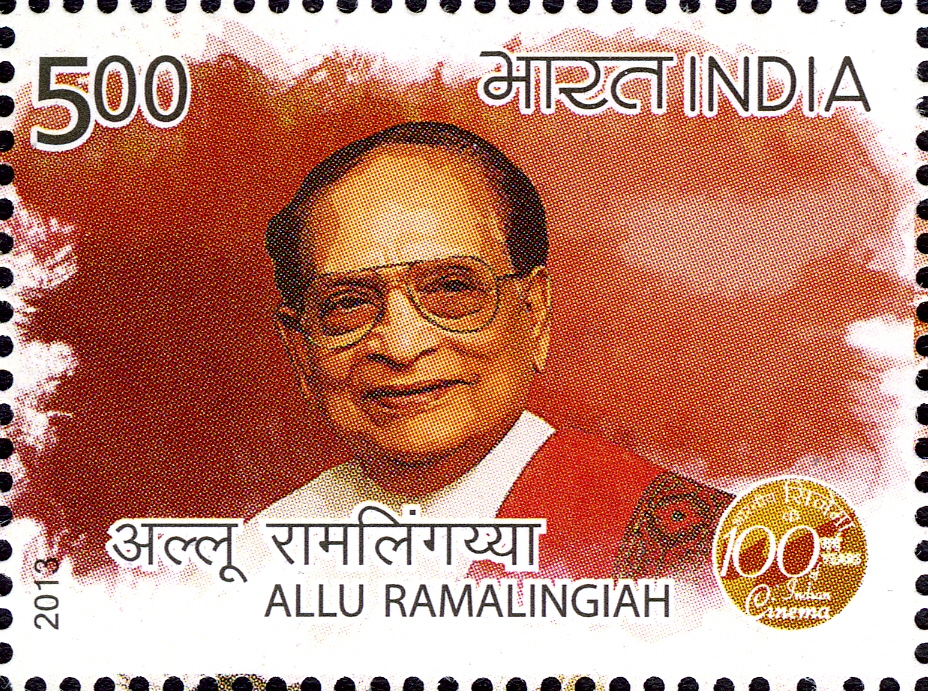
Allu Ramalingaiah

Allu Ramalingaiah was a prominent actor and comedian in Telugu cinema. He and his wife, Kanaka Ratnam, had five children: Aravind, Rajesh, Surekha, Vasantha and Bharathi. Allu Aravind, with his wife Nirmala, has three children ― Venkatesh, Arjun, and Sirish. The latter two are actors in Telugu cinema. Arjun is among the highest-paid actors in Telugu cinema. Arjun is married to Sneha Reddy, and the couple has two children, Ayaan and Arha.

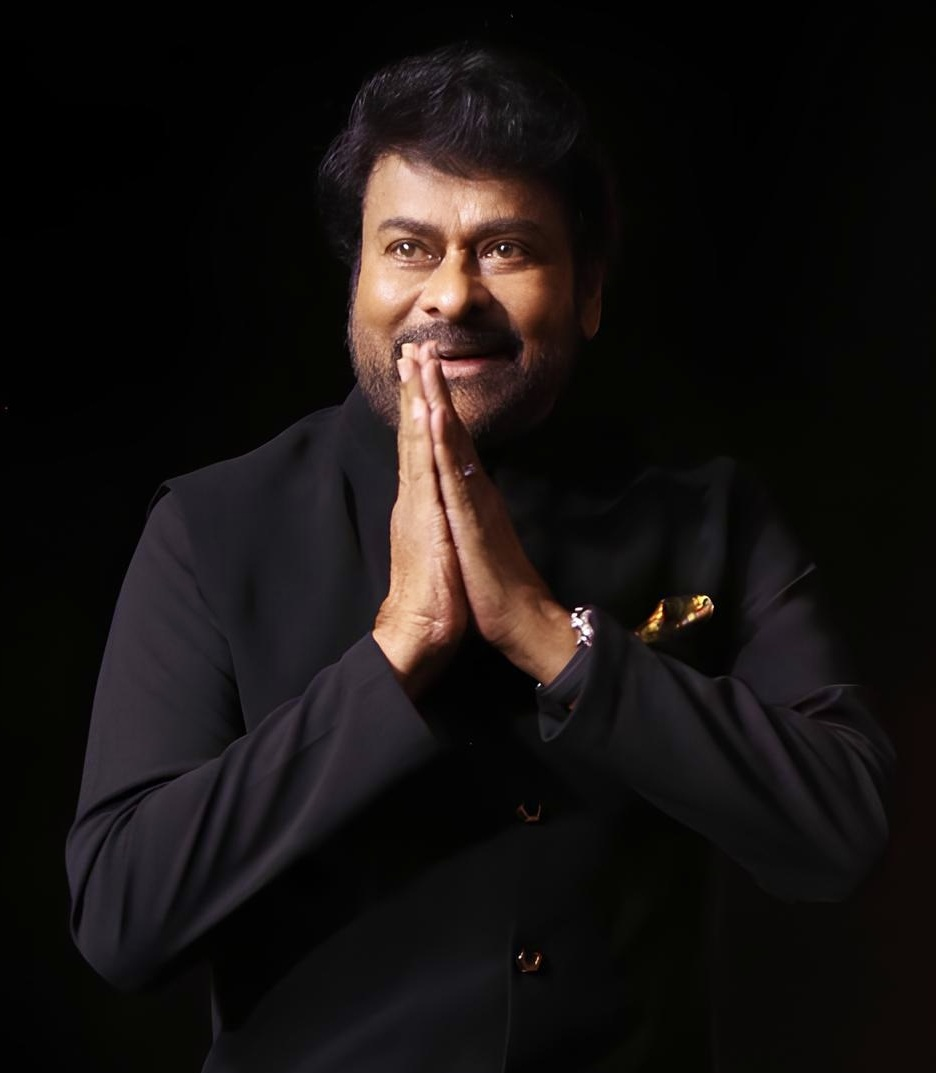
Chiranjeevi

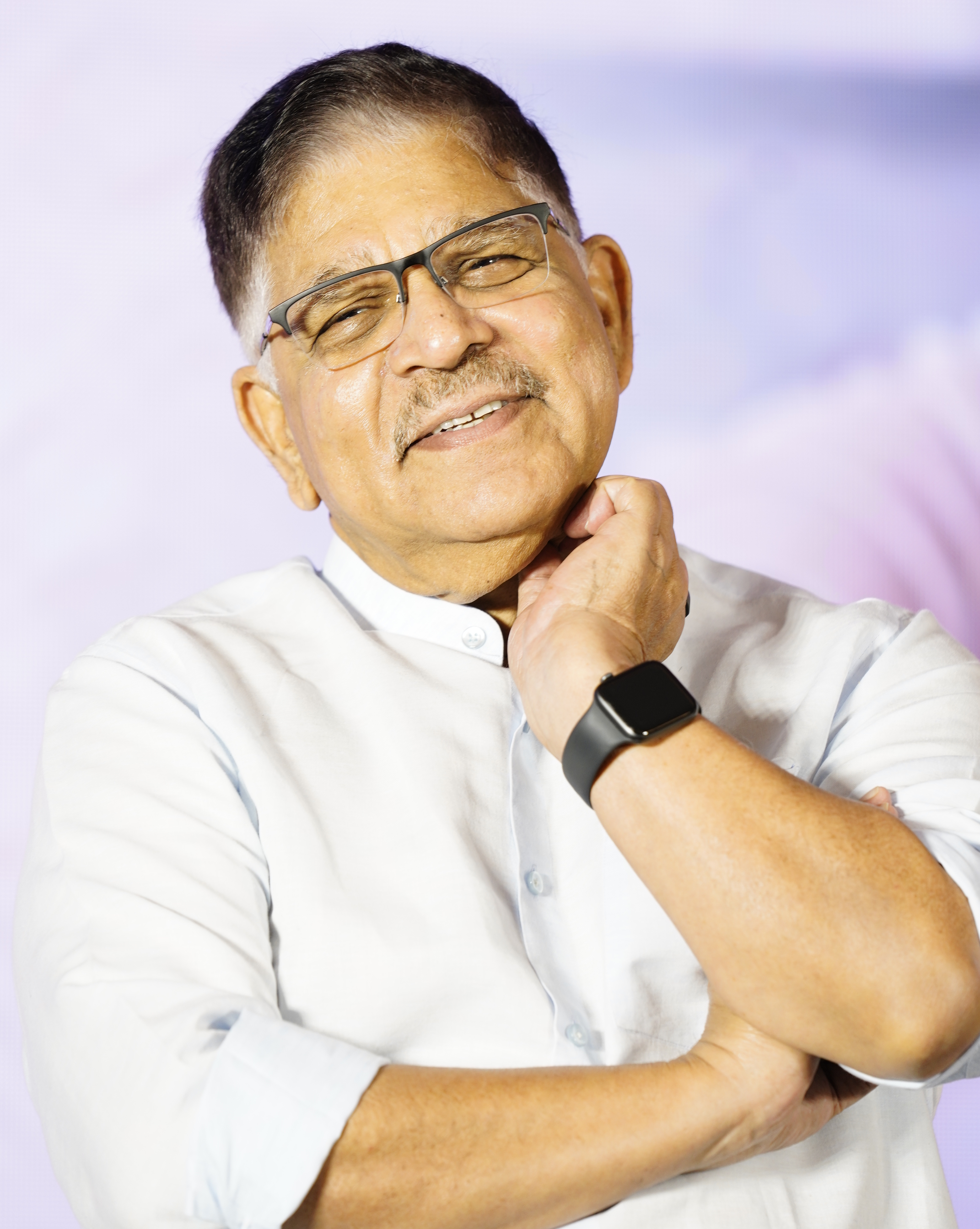
Allu Aravind
Allu Ramalingaiah's son

Chiranjeevi is an Indian actor, film producer and former politician who works predominantly in Telugu cinema. He is regarded as one of the most successful and influential actors in the history of Indian cinema. He is married to Surekha. The couple has three children: two daughters, Sushmitha and Sreeja, and a son, Ram Charan. Ram Charan is one of the highest paid actors of Indian cinema. He is married to Upasana Kamineni, grand-daughter of businessman Prathap C. Reddy and the couple has three children. Sushmitha is married to L. V. Vishnu Prasad and they are the parents of two daughters. Sreeja has been married twice ― first, to Sirish Bharadwaj, and then to actor Kalyaan Dhev ― and has two daughters: one with Sirish, and one with Kalyaan.

Chiranjeevi has two younger brothers, Nagendra Babu, and actor-politician Pawan Kalyan. Nagendra Babu's children are Varun Tej and Niharika, both of whom are actors. Varun Tej is married to actress Lavanya Tripathi. Kalyan has four children ― Akira Nandan and Adya with Renu Desai― and Polena Anjana Pawanova and Mark Shankar Pawanovich with Anna Lezhneva.

Chiranjeevi has two sisters, Madhavi Rao and Vijaya Durga. Durga has two sons, Sai Dharam Tej and Panja Vaisshnav Tej, both of whom are actors.

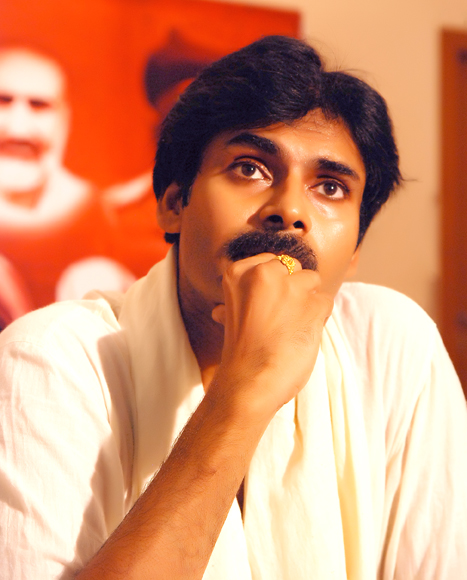
Pawan Kalyan
Chiranjeevi's younger brother

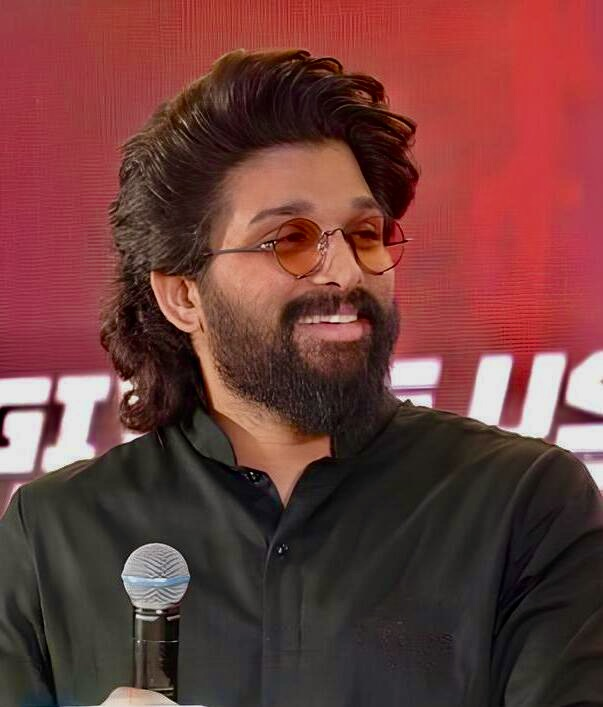
Allu Arjun
Allu Aravind's son

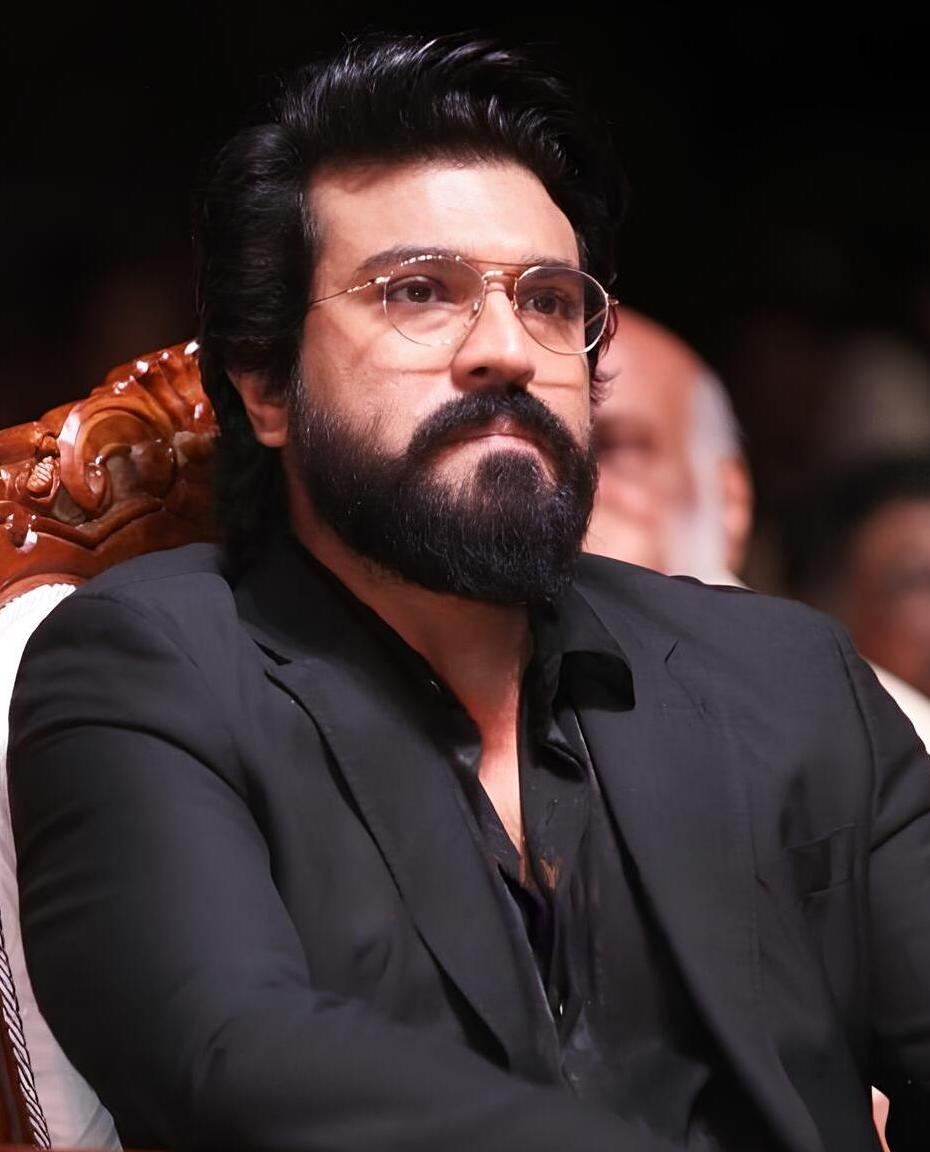
Ram Charan
Chiranjeevi's son

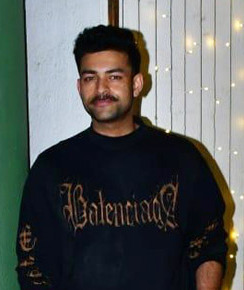
Varun Tej
Nagendra Babu's son

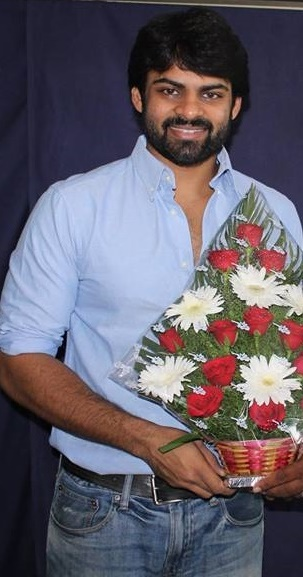
Sai Durgha Tej
Vijaya Durga's son

== Family tree ==
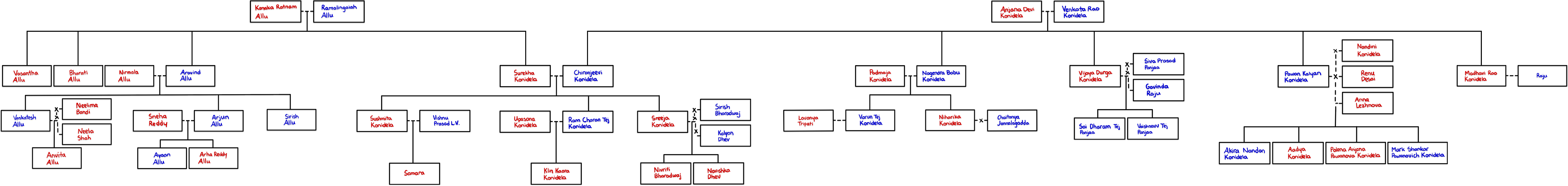
Detailed Mega Family Tree

Family tree of Konidela–Allu

Allu Ramalingaiah	Kanakaratnam	Konidela Venkat Rao	Anjana Devi
Muttamsetty Nirmala	Allu Aravind	Surekha	Chiranjeevi	Nagendra Babu	Padmaja	Pawan Kalyan	Vijaya Durga	Siva Prasad
Allu Arjun	Allu Sirish	Ram Charan	Varun Tej	Niharika Konidela	Sai Dharam Tej	Panja Vaishnav Tej

== See also ==
- Akkineni–Daggubati family
- Nandamuri–Nara family
