= Orange (2010 film) =

2010 Indian film by Bhaskar

- Film Poster
- Directed by: Bhaskar
- Written by: Bhaskar
- Produced by: K. Nagendra Babu
- Starring: Ram Charan; Genelia D'Souza; Shazahn Padamsee
- Cinematography: Kiran Reddy; B. Rajasekar
- Edited by: Marthand K. Venkatesh
- Music by: Harris Jayaraj
- Production company: Anjana Productions
- Distributed by: Geetha Arts
- Release date: 26 November 2010
- Running time: 160 minutes
- Country: India
- Language: Telugu

Orange is a 2010 Indian Telugu-language romantic comedy drama film written and directed by Bhaskar. The film stars Ram Charan, Genelia D'Souza, and Shazahn Padamsee, while Prabhu and Prakash Raj play supporting roles. The music was composed by Harris Jayaraj.

Orange was released on 26 November 2010. It opened to mixed reviews and became a box office failure. It was dubbed and released in Tamil as Ramcharan in 2011 and in Hindi as Ram Ki Jung. Its Malayalam dubbed version titled Hai Ramcharan was released on 18 April 2012.

== Plot ==
In Sydney, an angry man named Ram, who just broke up with his girlfriend Jaanu, narrates his love life to a police officer, Abishek Verma, as he defaces a graffiti of his lover while Jaanu's father listens.

Ram is a youngster who does graffiti and does not believe in everlasting love. He has gone through nine loves in his life and thinks that love between two people eventually dies out. As a person with strong morals, he is honest and wants to love life and live with an open mind, open thoughts, and open actions. Jaanu studies in the same college as Ram. He falls in love with her at first sight and goes on wooing her. She eventually falls for him, but wants him to promise to love her forever. Ram, of course, nonchalantly dismisses this and explains how he cannot love her forever. This leads to a clash of their ideologies. Ram shows Jaanu how true love cannot stay forever, while Jaanu shows him examples of everlasting love, such as her friends and parents. However, he makes it clear that love between two people is never the same as it was at first.

Abishek makes Ram explain why he feels this way, and Ram explains another love in his life: Rooba. He falls in love with her when she visits Hyderabad, while he is on a foreign exchange project. He follows her to Mumbai, and they both fall in love. However, as time passes, the couple faces problems, and Ram feels himself lying more and more to make Rooba happy. Unable to take it anymore, he tells her that he cannot continue loving her if he has to lie and sacrifice so much for her. They break up, and through the experience, Ram becomes the man he is. Ram tries wooing Jaanu once again, but soon backs off, knowing her desire for a commitment and a life partner.

In the end, the story goes back to the present, where Ram is shown defacing Jaanu's face in his graffiti. Abishek also realizes that Ram is right in his own way. Ram reveals that Jaanu asked him to give up graffiti and get a job as a painting teacher. Initially, Ram is reluctant but realizes that he loves himself more than he loves his partner, so he should start loving his partner more and even learns that sacrifices are an integral part of a relationship. Hence, he gives up graffiti and decides to propose to Jaanu again, trying to be committed. Ram and Jaanu end up together.

== Cast ==
- Ram Charan as Ram
- Genelia as Jaanu
- Shazahn A. Padamsee as Rooba, Ram’s ex-girlfriend
- Prabhu as Jaanu's father
- Mukesh Rishi as Ram's father
- Prakash Raj as Sergeant Abishek Verma
- Brahmanandam as Puppy, Jaanu’s friend
- Sanjay Swaroop as Ram's brother-in-law
- Manjula as Ram's sister
- Srinivas Avasarala as Ajay, Jaanu's one-sided lover for a pushkaram (transl. 12 years)
- Sameer Hasan as Jaanu's uncle
- Pavitra Lokesh as Jaanu's mother
- Vennela Kishore as Ram's friend
- Praneeth Yaron as Ram's friend
- Sagar
- Jayalakshmi as Rooba's mother
- Kalpika Ganesh as Jaanu's friend
- Sanchita Shetty as Soni, Jaanu’s friend
- Lahari Vishnuvazhala as Ram's friend
- Indraneil Varma as Rajesh
- Siddhu Jonnalagadda as Santosh, Maya’s assistant
- Phanikanth Rampalli as Mahesh
- Master Pranav as young Ram
- Justin Pringle as Australian police officer Jeff Pringle
- Stone Gye as Australian Bodyguard
- Samuel Gaskin as Graffiti Gang member

Special appearances

- Nyra Banerjee as Madhu, Ram’s girlfriend
- Gayatri Rao as Maya (Guest Appearance)
- Pooja Umashankar as Meenakshi Teacher, Ram’s childhood crush
- Naga Babu as Ram's neighbor
- Sivaji Ganesan as Jaanu's grandfather (in portrait)
- Savitri as Jaanu's grandmother (in portrait)

== Production ==
The muhurat took place on 21 October 2009. Ram Charan wanted to do a love story after Magadheera (2009) and contacted Bhaskar. Genelia was cast in the film, which was to be produced by Ram Charan's uncle Nagendra Babu. Kajal Aggarwal was initially considered to play another heroine but she was later replaced by Shazahn Padamsee, marking her Telugu debut.

Ram Charan and Genelia play Indian students studying in Australia. The film was shot in Melbourne and Sydney, Australia and Mumbai, India. The film is the largest Indian budget film that was mostly shot in Australia. Over two hundred and fifty people from Australia were a part of the cast and crew. Victorian Opposition leader Ted Baillieu had visited the live shooting location of the movie in Melbourne to learn and explore the possibility of attracting Indian film industry to shoot in Victoria. Ted had brief chats with Ram Charan and K. Nagendra Babu about the Indian film industry.

The film shoot shifted to Malaysia on 22 August 2010 with Ram Charan joining the sets the following day.

== Soundtrack ==
Harris Jayaraj composed the soundtrack and background score, in his first collaboration with Ram Charan and Bhaskar. The album consists of six tracks with Vanamali, Ramajogayya Sastry, Surrender Krishna, Kedarnath Parimi penning the lyrics. Karunya, Karthik, Naresh Iyer, Vijay Prakash, Benny Dayal, Shail Hada, Maya performed the vocals. The rights for the soundtrack album were purchased by Aditya Music record label. The audio was launched on 25 October 2010 at Shilpakala Vedika in Hyderabad. The audio went on to receive highly positive reviews from critics and audience and has attained a cult status over the period in the realm of Telugu Cinema Music. The album was nominated at major award ceremonies for best music direction including Filmfare Awards South.

== Release ==
The film was released on 26 November 2010. The film was then re-released on 25 March 2023.It was re-released again in 14 February 2025 and again in 7 February 2026.

== Reception ==
Jeevi of Idlebrain.com gave the film a rating of 3.25 out of 5 and wrote, "Orange is an honest film with a nice story idea despite inconsistencies and a few dull moments". Serish Nanisetti of The Hindu opined, "Orange is a luridly vivid non-linear narrative with the smarts in all the right places" and noted that "Ambiguity and love may not go together in Indian film industry, but Baskar manages to tell the story and keep the attention of the audience". Sify rated the film 2.75 out of 5 and noted, "Orange maybe the symbol of love but we hardly find any love in the movie. Less love, more arguments – that's about it". Radhika Rajamani of Rediff.com gave the film a rating of 2 1/2 out of five stars and wrote, "It becomes a bit monotonous to hear the lines on love over and over again. The confusion over the 'love' issue slows down the proceedings". Deepa Garimella of Full Hyderabad said, "On the whole, the film tends to look confused and shaky in its fundamentals, and Bhaskar could have chosen a more streamlined way of telling his story, but for what it's worth, Orange seems a decent step out of the clutter".

== Box office ==
The film was a box office failure despite the successful soundtrack. However, it has been people's favourite much later to its theatrical run and even the critics admit it's a film that's ahead of its time.

== Awards and nominations ==
Award	Category	Nominee	Result	Ref.
Filmfare Awards South	Best Music Director	Harris Jayaraj	Nominated	
Filmfare Awards South	Best Lyricist	Vanamali for "Nenu Nuvvantu"	Nominated	
Filmfare Awards South	Best Playback Singer – Male	Naresh Iyer for "Nenu Nuvvantu"	Nominated	
Mirchi Music Awards South	Technical Award for Sound Mixing – Telugu	M. Ramesh Aravind for "Rooba Rooba" (Note: Also for Shantanu Hudlikar for "Neeve" in Darling (2010).)	Won	
Mirchi Music Awards South	Best Album of the Year	Harris Jayaraj	Won	
Mirchi Music Awards South	Mirchi Listeners' Choice Song of the Year – Telugu	"Nenu Nuvvantu"	Won	
Mirchi Music Awards South	Mirchi Listeners' Choice Best Album	Harris Jayaraj	Won	
Big FM Awards	Best Music Director	Harris Jayaraj	Won	
Big FM Awards	Best Playback Singer	Karunya for "Oola Oolala Ala"	Won	
