= Kauravudu =

2000 Telugu film by V. Jyothikumar

- Theatrical release poster
- Directed by: V. Jyothi Kumar
- Written by: V. Jyothi Kumar
- Produced by: K. Padmaja
- Starring: Nagababu; Ramya Krishna
- Cinematography: Mohan Chand
- Edited by: K. Rango Paul Reddy
- Music by: Mani Sharma
- Production companies: Sai Varun Tej Arts; Anjana Productions (presenter)
- Release date: 27 July 2000
- Country: India
- Language: Telugu

Kauravudu is a 2000 Indian Telugu-language film directed by V. Jyothikumar. The film stars Nagendra Babu and Ramya Krishna in lead roles. It was produced by K. Padmaja under the banners of Sai Varun Teja Arts and Anjana Productions. The music was composed by Mani Sharma, with cinematography by Mohan Chand and editing by K. Rango Paul Reddy. The film was a remake of Kannada film Kowrava, which itself was inspired by the Tamil film Kadalora Kavithaigal, which was remade in Telugu as Aradhana. Kauravudu was not successful at the box office.

== Plot ==
Zamindar Surya (Naga Babu) who harbours a deep hatred for women is feared by the villagers. His resentment stems from painful experiences: his brother was betrayed by his lover, and his wife, who was involved in an illicit affair, committed suicide after the affair was exposed. Sasi (Ramya Krishna), a newly posted school teacher, learns of the reasons for Surya's animosity towards women through his mother, Santhamma (Annapurna). Determined to change his perspective, Sasi sets out to transform his view of women.

Sasi's opportunity arises when she saves Surya's son, Chandu, from a dangerous accident at school, risking her own life in the process. Surya, moved by her courage, begins to appreciate her, leading to a romantic relationship between them. However, Sasi is already in love with Rahul (Achyuth), and when a gang led by Dattu (Ramaraju) attempts to assault her, Surya arrives just in time to save her. Dattu, harboring resentment against Surya, manipulates Sasi into believing that Surya orchestrated the attack to gain her admiration, causing her to distance herself from him and leave town.

Surya, seeking redemption, becomes the target of Dattu's gang once more and is nearly killed by a crazed bull. His son, Chandu, is severely injured in the attack and taken to a city hospital. Chandu, who is fond of Sasi, asks to see her, believing she can save him. Surya convinces Sasi to meet him, but she remains skeptical of his intentions. With the help of Sasi's father (Subbaraya Sarma), the misunderstanding between Sasi and Surya is cleared. Sasi rushes to the hospital, and Chandu recovers. Meanwhile, Rahul's true character is revealed, and Sasi ultimately agrees to marry Surya, leading to a happy conclusion.

== Cast ==
- Nagababu as Surya
- Ramya Krishna as Sasi
- Annapurna as Santhamma
- Achyuth as Rahul
- M. S. Narayana
- Sivaji Raja
- Raja Ravindra as Dattu's henchman
- Uttej
- Subbaraya Sarma as Sasi's father
- Kallu Chidambaram
- Ramaraju as Dattu
- Ajay as Dattu's henchman
- Madhusudhan Rao as Dattu's henchman (uncredited)

== Production ==
Kauravudu was produced by K. Padmaja and features a story and screenplay by the Anjana Productions Unit. The film includes fight choreography by Kanal Kannan and editing by K. Rango Paul Reddy.

== Music ==
The music for the film was composed by Mani Sharma, with lyrics written by Chintapalli Ramana. The track list is as follows: The song "Ku Ku" was remade from song of same name from Kannada film Kowrava.

All lyrics are written by Chintapalli Ramana.

No.	Title	Singer(s)	Length
1.	"Ku..Ku..Ku"	K. S. Chithra
2.	"Amma Padani"	K. S. Chithra
3.	"Rayanti Raraju"	Gopika Poornima
4.	"Mammeluko"	S. P. Balasubrahmanyam, Dharma Teja
5.	"Antha Naa Istam"	Muralidhar, Dharma Teja
6.	"Ku..Ku..Ku (Balu)"	Kalpana, S. P. Balasubrahmanyam
7.	"Dingudongu"	Radhika

== Reception ==
Jeevi of Idlebrain.com described Kauravudu as a routine story with a slick screenplay and entertaining performances, highlighting its appeal to fans and smaller audiences rather than urban viewers. Andhra Today reviewed Kauravudu as a disappointing film, criticizing its weak story, poor casting choices, and portrayal of the hero, though acknowledging Naga Babu's performance and Mohan Chand's cinematography. Fullhyderabad noted that the film features an entertaining first half filled with comedy but becomes overly melodramatic in the second half, also praising M. S. Narayana's performance.
