= Mugguru Monagallu (1994 film) =

- Theatrical poster
- Directed by: K. Raghavendra Rao
- Produced by: Nagendra Babu
- Starring: Chiranjeevi; Ramya Krishna; Nagma; Roja
- Cinematography: K. S. Hari
- Edited by: Vellaiswamy
- Music by: Vidyasagar
- Production company: Anjana Productions
- Release date: 7 January 1994
- Country: India
- Language: Telugu

Mugguru Monagallu (transl. Three Courageous Men) is a 1994 Indian Telugu-language action comedy film directed by K. Raghavendra Rao and produced by Chiranjeevi's younger brother Nagendra Babu. This film stars Chiranjeevi in a triple role, Ramya Krishna, Nagma and Roja. The music and background score were composed by Vidyasagar. The film was released on 7 January 1994. This movie is dubbed in Hindi as Trishul. Story by Satyanand.

== Plot ==
Prudhvi, Vikram and Dattatreya (Chiranjeevi in a triple role) are the sons of Ranganath and Srividya living in a village. Ranganath goes against Sarath Saxena in an incident and is killed by him. Srividya, who is pregnant with twins, is separated from Prudhvi. She thinks that he is killed while escaping from the goons and delivers the twins in a temple. The priest who is childless adopts one son and names him Dattatreya. Srividya is left with Vikram, who becomes an Assistant Commissioner of Police. Dattatreya is a Dance master. The story revolves on how the brothers unite with one another and also with their mother and take revenge on the villains.

== Cast ==
- Chiranjeevi as Prudhvi, Vikram and Dattathreya
- Ramya Krishna as Nagamani, Dattathreya's girl friend (voice over by Roja Ramani)
- Nagma as Rani, Vikram's lover (Voice over by Roja Ramani)
- Roja as Seeta, Pruthvi's wife (Voice over by Roja Ramani)
- Srividya as Vikram, Dattathreya, Prudhvi's mother
- Ranganath as Vikram, Dattathreya, Prudhvi's father
- Sharat Saxena as Banerjee
- Salim Ghouse as Chinna Banerjee
- Kota Srinivasa Rao
- Babu Mohan
- Brahmanandam as Sarva Mangalam
- Ponnambalam
- Kantharao as Dattatreya's foster father
- Sudhakar

== Soundtrack ==
The music and background score for the movie were composed by Vidyasagar.

=== Telugu version ===
Track list
No.	Title	Lyrics	Singer(s)	Length
1.	"Kottu Kottu Kobbarikaya"	Bhuvana Chandra	S. P. Balasubrahmanyam, K. S. Chithra	4:09
2.	"Aaja Aaja"	Bhuvana Chandra	Mano, K. S. Chithra	4:40
3.	"Chamanthi Puvva Puvva"	Bhuvana Chandra	S. P. Balasubrahmanyam, K. S. Chithra	4:40
4.	"Nuvvokkasari Ante Okays"	Bhuvana Chandra	S. P. Balasubrahmanyam, K. S. Chithra	4:16
5.	"Rajasekhara"	Vennelakanti	S. P. Balasubrahmanyam, S. Janaki	4:48
6.	"Rara Swamy Rara"	Bhuvana Chandra	S. P. Balasubrahmanyam, K. S. Chithra	6:02
7.	"Amma Ante"	Veturi	S. P. Balasubrahmanyam, K. S. Chithra	3:37
Total length:				32:15

=== Tamil version ===
Song title	Singers
"Roja"	Mano, K. S. Chithra
"Saamanthi Poove"	Mano, K. S. Chitra
"Rajasekara"	Mano, K. S. Chitra
"Swamy Va Va"	Mano, K. S. Chitra
"Amma Endral"	Mano, K. S. Chitra
"Kuthu Kuthu"	Mano, K. S. Chitra

== Release ==
The film was dubbed and released in Tamil as Alex Pandian.
