= Nagendra Babu =

Indian actor, producer and politician (born 1961)

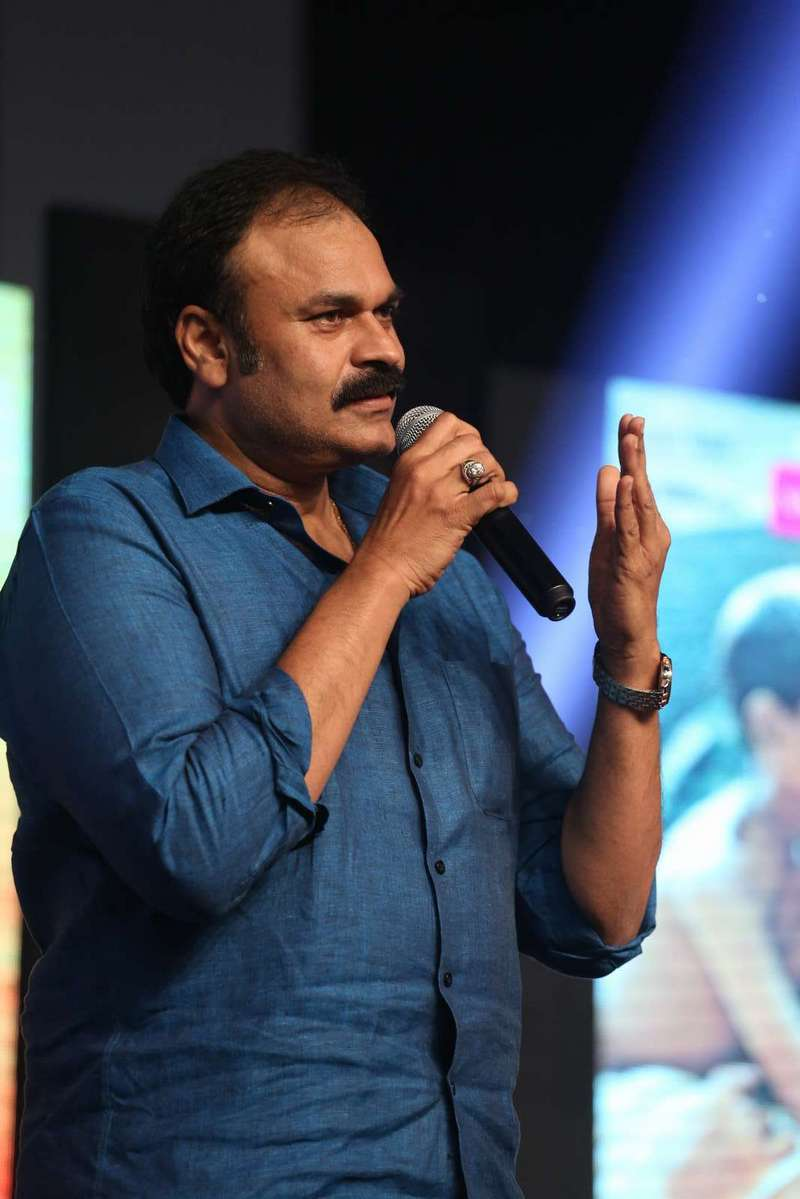
- Nagendra Babu at an Audio function

General Secretary of the Janasena Party
- Incumbent
- Assumed office 20 March 2019

Member of Legislative Council of Andhra Pradesh
- Incumbent
- Assumed office 30 March 2025

Personal details
- Born: Konidela Nagendra Rao; 29 October 1961 (age 65) Mogalthur, Andhra Pradesh, India
- Party: Janasena Party (2019–present)
- Spouse: Padmaja Konidela
- Children: Varun Tej; Niharika
- Relatives: Chiranjeevi (brother); Pawan Kalyan (brother); Varun Tej (son); Niharika Konidela (daughter); See Konidela–Allu family
- Occupation: Actor; producer; director; politician

Konidela Nagendra Rao (born 29 October 1961), popularly known as Nagendra Babu and Naga Babu, is an Indian actor, producer, and politician who works in Telugu cinema. He has received one National Film Award and two Nandi Awards for his work as a producer. He is the general secretary of the Janasena Party and the Member of Andhra Pradesh Legislative Council since March 2025.

== Acting career ==
Nagendra Babu acts mainly in supporting roles, though he has also played the lead role in some films. He has acted in 143, Anji, Shock, Sri Ramadasu, Chandamama and Orange. He has produced several films with his brothers, Chiranjeevi and Pawan Kalyan under Anjana Productions. He has two children, actor Varun Tej and Niharika. He appeared in television serials and was a judge on the comedy show, Jabardasth, which aired on ETV.

== Political career ==
Naga Babu joined Janasena Party established by his brother Pawan Kalyan and contested as a M.P. candidate for Narasapuram Lok Sabha constituency in the 2019 Indian general election. He lost after securing 250,289 votes.

On 13 March 2025, he was unanimously elected as Member of Andhra Pradesh Legislative Council.

=== AP-GREEN ===
In August 2026, Nagendra Babu was appointed Chairperson of the Executive Committee of the Andhra Pradesh Society for Greening and Reforestation for Ecological Enrichment (AP-GREEN). The Government of Andhra Pradesh accorded him Cabinet rank in his capacity as chairperson.

== Filmography ==
Key
†	Denotes films that have not yet been released

=== Films ===
==== Telugu films ====
Year	Film	Role	Notes
1986	Rakshasudu	Simham	
1988	Marana Mrudangam	Bhillu	
1988	Trinetrudu	CBI officer	
1989	Lankeswarudu	Satyam	Cameo appearance
1990	Kondaveeti Donga		
1990	Dharma		
1991	Super Express	Parasuram	
1991	Parishkaram	Satyam / Dr. Anand	
1991	Nayakuralu		
1992	420		
1992	Agreement	Radha	
1994	Allarodu	Sub-Inspector Ravi	
1995	Street Fighter	Prakash	
1995	Aunty		
1997	Rukmini	Bandababu	
1998	Priyuralu	Lorry Driver	Dubbed in Malayalam as Manjeeradhwani
1998	Bavagaru Bagunnara	Himself in 'Sorry Sorry' song	Cameo appearance
1999	Preyasi Raave		Cameo appearance
2000	Kauravudu		Lead
2000	Hands Up!	Muddu Krishna	
2000	Ganapati	Jail Sentry Swami	
2001	Chiranjeevulu	Nagendra	
2001	Mrugaraju	Appanna Dora	
2001	Murari		Cameo appearance
2004	Anji	Sivanna	
2004	Andaru Dongale Dorikite	KK	
2004	143	Director General of Police	
2005	Manasu Maata Vinadu	Subash Chandra Bose	
2005	Okkade		
2005	Nireekshana		
2005	Seenugadu Chiranjeevi Fan	Himself	Cameo appearance
2005	Sravanamasam		
2005	Prayatnam		
2005	Mr. Errababu	Chakravarthy	
2005	Sri		
2006	Shock	CBI Officer	
2006	Sri Ramadasu	Raavana	Cameo appearance
2006	Amma Cheppindi	Sugar Trader	
2006	Bhagyalakshmi Bumper Draw	Lottery Inspector	
2006	Annavaram	Assistant Commissioner of Police	
2007	Operation Duryodhana		
2007	Shankar Dada Zindabad	Himself in 'Jagadeka Veeruniki' Song	Cameo appearance
2007	Chandamama	Ranga Rao	
2007	Godava	Chief Guest for Youth Festival	Cameo appearance
2008	Subham		
2008	Premabhishekam		
2008	Aatadista	Lion Rajendra	
2008	Kalidasu	Police Officer, Kalidasu's Father	
2008	Michael Madana Kamaraju	Archana's father	
2008	Ready	Pooja's father	
2008	Hero	Nagendra Naidu	
2008	Andamaina Abaddam		
2008	Naa Manasukemayindi		
2008	Sarkar	Ajay sarkar	Lead
2008	Aapadamokkulavaadu		
2008	Ek Police		
2009	Mental Krishna		
2009	Srisailam		
2009	Anjani Putrudu		
2009	Posani Gentleman		
2010	Aakasa Ramanna	Isha's father	
2010	Orange	Ram's neighbour	Cameo appearance
2010	Ranga The Donga	Police Commissioner	
2011	Mirapakay	Narayana Murthy	
2011	Veera	DGP K. Vijaykumar	
2011	Money Money, More Money	Jagadish	
2011	Dookudu	Commissioner Surya Prakash	
2012	Tuneega Tuneega	Ravindra Babu	
2012	Genius	Raghuvaran	
2013	Okkadine	Seenu Mama	
2013	Baadshah	Balram IPS	Cameo appearance
2013	Shadow	Raghuram	
2013	Greeku Veerudu		
2013	Alias Janaki	Janaki's father	
2013	1000 Abaddalu	Tower Star	
2013	Jagadguru Adi Shankara		
2013	Chandee	CBI Officer	
2014	Maaya		
2014	Choosinodiki Choosinanta		
2014	Dil Deewana	Tilak	
2014	Galata		
2014	Prabhanjanam	Chaitanya's Father	
2015	Gaddam Gang	Rowdy Director	
2015	Subramanyam for Sale	NRI Rajasekhar	
2015	Bruce Lee - The Fighter	Judge Ram Bhupal	Cameo appearance
2016	Soggade Chinni Nayana	Yama Dharma Raju	
2016	Chal Chal Gurram		
2017	Khaidi No. 150	Judge	
2017	Kittu Unnadu Jagratha	Janaki's father	
2017	Jawaan	Police Commissioner	
2018	Geetha Govindam	Govind's father	
2018	Aravinda Sametha Veera Raghava	Narappa Reddy	
2019	Mr. Majnu	Nikitha's father	
2019	ABCD - American Born Confused Desi	Aravind's father	
2019	Edaina Jaragocchu	Church Father	
2022	Bangarraju	Yama Dharma Raju	
2022	Sarkaru Vaari Paata	Mahi's father	Cameo appearance
2022	Sadha Nannu Nadipe	Dr. Sekhar	
2022	Thaggedele	Fake godman	
2022	Ranga Ranga Vaibhavanga	Minister	
2023	Baby	Vaishnavi's father	
2023	Ala Ila Ela	Surya's father	
2023	Peddha Kapu 1		
2026	Memu Copulam	Gajapathi Raju	

==== Tamil films ====
Year	Film	Role	Notes
2012	Vettai	Lingamurthy	
2017	Vizhithiru	Police Commissioner	
2017	Indrajith	Ravi Verma	
2023	Jailer	Balsingh	Uncredited
2024	Oru Thee	Surya's father	

==== Kannada films ====
Year	Film	Role
1997	Dhairya	
1999	Habba	Seetha's brother
2019	Kempegowda 2	Police Commissioner

==== As producer ====
He debuted as a producer with Rudraveena on the Anjana Productions banner which won the National Award. He has produced eight films.

Year	Film name	Notes
1988	Rudraveena	Nargis Dutt Award for Best Feature Film on National Integration; Nandi Special Jury Award
1988	Trinetrudu	
1994	Mugguru Monagallu	
1998	Bavagaru Bagunnara?	
2000	Kauravudu	
2004	Gudumba Shankar	
2006	Stalin	Nandi Special Jury Award
2010	Orange	

==== As dubbing artist ====
- Aadukalam Naren (Pizza; Telugu version)

=== Television ===
==== As actor ====
	Title	Network	Notes
	Aparanji	Gemini TV	
2004	Santosham	ETV	
2012	Sikharam	ETV	
	Sitamalakshmi	MAA TV	
2018	Nanna Koochi	ZEE5	
2024	Paruvu	ZEE5	

==== As judge ====
Year	Show	Network	Notes
	Veera	ETV	
	Adhurs S1 & S2	ETV	
2013-2019	Jabardasth	ETV	
2015-2019	Extra Jabardasth	ETV	
	Bomma Adirindi	Zee Telugu	
