= Stalin (2006 film) =

2006 Indian film by A. R. Murugadoss

- Theatrical release poster
- Directed by: A. R. Murugadoss
- Written by: A. R. Murugadoss; Paruchuri Brothers (dialogues)
- Produced by: Nagendra Babu
- Starring: Chiranjeevi; Trisha; Khushbu Sundar
- Cinematography: Chota K. Naidu
- Edited by: Anthony
- Music by: Mani Sharma
- Production company: Anjana Productions
- Release date: 20 September 2006 (India)
- Running time: 176 minutes
- Country: India
- Language: Telugu
- Budget: ₹16 crore
- Box office: est.₹28 crore distributors' share

Stalin is a 2006 Indian Telugu-language political action drama film directed by A. R. Murugadoss. It stars Chiranjeevi in the titular role, with Trisha and Khushbu Sundar in other prominent roles and Prakash Raj, Sharada, Pradeep Rawat, and Brahmanandam playing supporting roles. The film was screened at the International Film Festival of India in the mainstream section.

The film released on 20 September 2006. The film producer Nagendra Babu won the Nandi Special Jury Award. The film was inspired from the movie Play it Forward form 2000 and was also dubbed and released into Tamil under the same title, and remade into Hindi as Jai Ho in 2014. Some aspects of the plot was reported to have been inspired from 2000 film Pay It Forward.

== Plot ==
The only mission in Stalin's life is to help others and make the world a better place. It turns out that he served as a Major in the Indian Army. Although a war hero, he quit the army after a rift with Lt. Col. Iqbal Kakar when he transfers him to the administrative division from the battlefield as a disciplinary action. His family includes his mother and sister Jhansi, who is not in talking terms with their mother since she married a Punjabi.

Stalin keeps helping a physically challenged girl named Sumati write her intermediate examination, and her suicide disturbs him. The death occurs as none of the people around her extend help. Stalin then plans a chain system. The theme works on a principle that everyone should help others, and in return, they should not seek a mere thanks but tell those who get the help to help three more, with a condition that those who get help from them should also demand the same. Stalin thinks that this chain will develop helping attitude among the people but unfortunately finds that the chain did not work. On one occasion, he bashes a rich boy who injured a beggar.

This goes in a chain reaction, and the rich boy employs goons to attack Stalin. As Stalin disappears from the scene, the goons take Jhansi and her friend Chitra into their custody. Stalin reaches the spot and hacks the hand of one goon which happens to be the henchman of an MLA, who is the son-in-law of Home Minister Muddu Krishnayya. Krishnayya takes it as a prestige issue and tries to eliminate Stalin but loses his son in the process. When the Chief Minister intervenes to bring in a patch-up, Krishnayya plans to kill him and implicate Stalin in the murder. Stalin saves the injured Chief Minister but experiences a severe chest pain due to exertion.

The reason for the chest pain is a bullet which remained in his chest, very near to his heart. Stalin sustains the bullet injury in the Kargil War, and that was why Iqbal shifted him to the administrative department. Finally, the truth prevails, and the CM returns to the hospital to visit Stalin. The "help three people" concept was his brainchild, which saved him from death in the form of a schoolgirl. Finally, the doctors successfully remove the bullet in a very delicate surgery. Krishnayya also gets arrested. Stalin realises that his "help three people" concept worked well, and the same theme saved his life in the form of an auto driver. He thanks everyone for making his concept a success.

== Cast ==
- Chiranjeevi as Major Stalin
- Trisha as Chitra
- Prakash Raj as Home Minister Muddu Krishnayya
- Sharada as Stalin's mother
- Khushbu Sundar as Jhansi, Stalin's elder sister
- Pradeep Rawat as MLA and Muddu Krishnayya's son-in-law
- Paruchuri Venkateswara Rao as Advisor of Muddu Krishnayya
- Giri Babu as Rama Chandra Murthy
- Brahmanandam as Priest
- Mukesh Rishi as Lt. Col. Iqbal Kakar
- Riyaz Khan as Muddu Krishnayya's son
- Ravali as Muddu Krishnayya's daughter
- Sunil as Stalin's friend
- Siva Reddy as Stalin's friend
- Harshavardhan as Stalin's friend
- Baby Annie as Stalin's friend's daughter
- Hema as Chitra's mother
- Sudeepa Pinky as Chitra's sister
- Brahmaji as Captain Rao
- Suman as Doctor
- Delhi Kumar as Chief Minister
- Subbaraju as Goon
- Amit Tiwari as Goon
- Mounica as Lakshmi
- L. B. Sriram as Auto Driver Babji
- Gangadhar Pandey as Doctor
- Ravi Prakash as Software Engineer
- Meena Kumari as Sireesha
- Surekha Vani as Baby's mother
- Supreeth as Malli
- Chatrapathi Sekhar as Venkadri
- Narsing Yadav as Ameerpet Abbulu
- Anushka Shetty (special appearance)
- Rambha (special appearance in the song "Parare Parare")
- Gopichand Malineni (special appearance)

== Music ==
Stalin

Soundtrack album by Mani Sharma
- Released: 22 June 2006
- Recorded: 2006
- Genre: Film soundtrack
- Length: 30:30
- Label: Aditya Music
- Producer: Mani Sharma

Mani Sharma chronology
Ashok (2006)	Stalin (2006)	Raraju (2006)

Audio of Stalin was launched on 22 August 2006 at a jam pack auditorium of Lalitha Kala Vedika in Public Gardens, Hyderabad. Pawan Kalyan launched the audio of gave the first cassette to Nimmagadda Prasad (Matrix Labs) and Murali Krishnam Raju (MAA TV). The film has six songs composed by Mani Sharma, with lyrics by Anantha Sriram, Pedada Murthy, Kadikonda and Suddala Ashok Teja.

Track list
No.	Title	Lyrics	Singer(s)	Length
1.	"Go Go Goa"	Anantha Sriram	Ranjith, Mahalakshmi Iyer	5:00
2.	"Siggutho Chi Chi"	Peddada Murthy	Sadhana Sargam, Hariharan, Mallikarjun (Uncredited)	4:59
3.	"I Wanna Spider Man"	Kandikonda	Rita, Naveen Madhav	5:07
4.	"Thobare Thoba"	Anantha Sreeram	Sunitha Upadrashta, S. P. Balasubrahmanyam	4:58
5.	"Suryude Selavani"	Suddala Ashok Teja	S. P. Balasubrahmanyam	5:10
6.	"Parare Parare"	Anantha Sreeram	Shankar Mahadevan	5:16
Total length:				30:30

== Reception ==
=== Critical reception ===
The film received mixed to positive reviews. Jeevi of idlebrain.com praised the performances of Chiranjeevi and Khushboo and stated that "First half of the film is pretty mediocre as there is no conflict thread in terms of villain. Second half is better from the moment villain enters the scene. The last 20 minutes of the film stands out with very good emotions." Sify.com gave it 3 on 5 stars as well and stated "The much hyped Murugadoss directed Stalin does not have Chiru as the comic book superhero in the first half. He is basically a do-gooder for his fellow-men as he attempts to make the world a better place to live. Chiru in such a role may or may not work with the masses but in this refreshingly different role, he is cool with a capital C." Indiaglitz.com also commented "Director Murugadoss, who made us all sit up and take notice through Tagore (story) and Ghajini, once again underlines his talent for making a wholesome and powerful mass masala movie. In Chiranjeevi, he has somebody who can bring to life any kind of idea he (Murugadoss) has. Chiranjeevi, it seems, has been particular about the 'message' aspect — at his stature and seniority, he had every reason to be."
