= Rudraveena (film) =

1988 film directed by K. Balachander

- Theatrical release poster
- Directed by: K. Balachander
- Written by: K. Balachander; Ganesh Patro
- Produced by: Nagendra Babu
- Starring: Chiranjeevi; Gemini Ganesan; Shobana
- Cinematography: R. Raghunatha Reddy
- Edited by: Ganesh Kumar
- Music by: Ilaiyaraaja
- Production company: Anjana Productions
- Distributed by: Geetha Arts
- Release date: 4 March 1988
- Running time: 170 minutes
- Country: India
- Language: Telugu

Rudraveena (lit. 'Strings of fury'; referring to the instrument of the same name) is a 1988 Indian Telugu-language musical drama film directed and co-written by K. Balachander. Produced by Nagendra Babu's Anjana Productions, the film stars Chiranjeevi alongside Tamil actor Gemini Ganesan and Shobana. P. L. Narayana, Prasad Babu, Sumithra, Devilalitha, and Brahmanandam play supporting roles.

Rudraveena focuses on the ideological conflicts between 'Bilahari' Ganapathi Sastry, a reputed carnatic musician and his younger son Suryanarayana "Suryam" Sastry. Sastry's discrimination towards the people belonging to lower castes is criticised by his son, Suryam, who believes in society's welfare and walks out for good later. The events that led to the change in Sastry's views form the remaining part of the story. Ganesh Patro wrote the film's dialogue and worked on the script with Balachander for two months, though it was tweaked many times during the shoot. Ilaiyaraaja composed the soundtrack and background score. R. Raghunadha Reddy was the director of photography. Ganesh Kumar edited the film and Mohanam was the art director.

Filmed in and around Madras, Kanchipuram, Courtallam, and Srinagar for 70 days, Rudraveena was produced on a budget of ₹80 lakh. Released on 4 March 1988 to critical acclaim, the film was a commercial failure, resulting in a loss of ₹60 lakh. It gained cult status later and is considered one of the best films made by Balachander. The film won three National Film Awards: Best Feature Film on National Integration, Best Music Direction, and Best Male Playback Singer (for S. P. Balasubrahmanyam). It also won four Nandi Awards, including a Special Jury award for Chiranjeevi. Later the same year, Balachander remade the film into Tamil as Unnal Mudiyum Thambi with Ganesan reprising his role and Kamal Haasan reprising Chiranjeevi's role in the Telugu original.

== Plot ==
Satyanarayana, an elderly Member of Parliament, visits the village of Ramapuram and finds it remarkably developed and self-reliant through the efforts of a local reformer named Suryam. Intrigued by the village's transformation, Satyanarayana requests Suryam to share his story so it can be presented as an inspirational model in Parliament.

Suryanarayana "Suryam" Sastry is the son of 'Bilahari' Ganapathi Sastry, an orthodox Carnatic music maestro who holds conservative views on caste and tradition. Suryam's elder brother, Udayam, is a mute nadaswaram player married to Gayathri, while his younger sister, Sandhya, plays the tambura. Ideological conflicts frequently arise between Suryam and Sastry, as the former prioritises community service over purist musical pursuits. During his travels, Suryam meets Lalitha Sivajyothi, a classical dancer from a marginalised caste who is forbidden from performing inside temples. Suryam supports her artistic talent, and with Gayathri's encouragement, proposes to Lalitha.

The rift between Suryam and Sastry widens when Suryam misses a concert to assist victims of a fire accident and when Sastry refuses to help a dying, injured lineman on the roadside, prompting an argument where Suryam asserts that human welfare surpasses art. Disowning Suryam, Sastry declares an amateur singer, Charukesa, as his musical heir. A devastated Suryam leaves home to live in Ramapuram, where he witnesses families destroyed by alcoholism and vows to eradicate liquor from the village.

Meanwhile, after discovering that Charukesa and Sandhya are in love, Sastry humiliates his lower financial standing. However, he marries them off due to Sandhya's insistence. After the wedding ceremony, Charukesa vindictively demands that Sastry forfeit performing his signature Bilahari raga in future concerts as dowry.

When Lalitha's father arranges Suryam and Lalitha's wedding, Sastry instigates local drunkards to disrupt the event. The men offer to give up alcohol permanently if Suryam cancels the marriage. With Lalitha's consent, Suryam calls off the wedding to achieve his goal, earning the villagers' respect and successfully reforming the community. Disgusted by Sastry's sabotage, Udayam and Gayathri leave the ancestral home.

Suryam and Lalitha establish the "Lalitha Grameena Sveeyasikshana Udyamam", a self-reliant initiative that successfully transforms twenty-eight neighbouring villages. Recognising his social service through Satyanarayana, the Prime Minister announces a national felicitation for Suryam in Ramapuram.

A repentant Sastry arrives at the ceremony, publicly sheds his arrogance, proudly introduces himself as Suryam's father, and approves of Suryam and Lalitha's marriage.

== Cast ==
- Chiranjeevi as Suryanarayana "Suryam" Sastry
- Gemini Ganesan as 'Bilahari' Ganapati Sastry
- Shobana as Lalitha Sivajyoti
- P. L. Narayana as Varalayya
- Prasad Babu as Udayam
- Sumithra as Gayathri
- Ramesh as Charukesa
- Devilalitha as Sandhya
- Dubbing Janaki as Bhavani
- Brahmanandam as Kishtappa
- Kaikala Satyanarayana as Satyanarayana (cameo appearance)

== Production ==
=== Development ===
Chiranjeevi wanted his brother Nagendra Babu to work in films after graduating from college. To gain experience in film production, Babu worked at the Geetha Arts company. He started a company named Anjana Productions after his mother K. Anjana Devi. He planned to make an unconventional film without considering Chiranjeevi's on-screen image as an action hero. After watching Sankarabharanam (1980) and Sindhu Bhairavi (1985), Babu approached Chiranjeevi's mentor K. Balachander to direct his maiden production venture. They worked together on Idi Katha Kaadu (1979) and 47 Rojulu (1981); Chiranjeevi played the antagonist in both films. Balachander agreed to direct the film; he chose the concept of national integration and rural development after watching Anna Hazare developing Ralegan Siddhi, a village in Maharashtra. He was also inspired by a retired Indian Administrative Service (IAS) officer's act of adopting his village in West Godavari district.

Balachander approached his favourite screenwriter Ganesh Patro to write the dialogues; Patro was credited for giving a native appeal to Balachander's successful Telugu films. Despite finding the concept obsolete, Patro silently completed the bound script in two months. According to Patro, Balachander tweaked the film's script many times during the shoot. They planned to name the film Bilahari after the Carnatic raga of the same name, but changed it to Rudraveena to reflect the characters' anger, equating it to that of the Hindu god Shiva.

=== Casting and filming ===
Shobana was chosen as the female lead; her experience as a dancer helped the film. After considering many options, Tamil actor Gemini Ganesan was finalised to play Chiranjeevi's father. This was one of the actor's rare appearances in Telugu cinema. Ganesan played 'Bilahari' Ganapathi Sastry, a reputed carnatic musician specialising in songs composed using Bilahari raga. S. P. Balasubrahmanyam dubbed Ganesan's dialogue portions as well as providing vocals as a playback singer. Rudraveena marked the Telugu cinema debut of Ramesh Aravind, another of Balachander's protégés; however, the film became his second release after Indradhanussu was released earlier that year. P. L. Narayana, Prasad Babu, Sumithra, Devilalitha, Dubbing Janaki and Brahmanandam played supporting roles.

Ilaiyaraaja was signed to compose the film's soundtrack and background score. R. Raghunadha Reddy was the film's director of photography. Ganesh Kumar edited the film and Mohanam was the art director. Filmmaker Bapu designed the logo of the production company and the film's title. The role written for Narayana was a last minute addition by Balachander; he took inspiration from similar characters in English plays and ballads he had read.

Rudraveena's principal photography took place at Chennai, Kanchipuram, Coutrallam, and Srinagar for 70 days. Balachander later remarked, "Chiranjeevi has both Kamal Haasan and Rajnikanth in him. Not only can he do action, he can also act".

== Music ==
Ilaiyaraaja composed the film's soundtrack and background score. with lyrics written by Sirivennela Sitaramasastri. The soundtrack featured nine songs released under the Aditya Music label, and is considered one of the acclaimed works of Ilaiyaraaja in Telugu cinema.

== Release ==
Rudraveena was produced on a budget of ₹80 lakh. Released on 4 March 1988, the film received critical acclaim. It was also premiered at the 12th International Film Festival of India. However, it was a commercial failure and Babu had to incur a loss of ₹60 lakh. It was dubbed as a setback for Chiranjeevi who had starred in a streak of successful films such as Pasivadi Pranam, Swayamkrushi, Jebu Donga (all released in 1987) and Manchi Donga (1988). Babu considered Rudraveena a spiritually awakening film personally and felt that a book could be written about it. The film was remade into Tamil as Unnal Mudiyum Thambi in the same year by Balachander himself, with Kamal Haasan reprising Chiranjeevi's role, while Ganesan and Aravind reprised their roles.

=== Critical reception ===
The retrospective reviews for the film were positive. In their Encyclopedia of Indian Cinema, Ashish Rajadhyaksha and Paul Willemen termed Rudraveena a reformist film for Chiranjeevi which aimed to achieve "greater critical respectability" for the actor by "addressing caste in a calculated effort". Suresh Krishnamoorthy of The Hindu commented that Rudraveena showcased Chiranjeevi in a different light compared to Marana Mrudangam, a successful mainstream film by the actor released in the same year. Mihir Fadnavis of Daily News and Analysis termed Chiranjeevi's performance in Rudraveena "possibly his best ever".

Pulagam Chinnarayana, writing for Sakshi, called Rudraveena a sugarcoated and non-preachy take on the harsh realities of 1980s Indian society by Balachander. K. Naresh Kumar of The Hans India praised Raghunadha Reddy's cinematography: "Reddy provides perfect eye-candy for the discerning visual lovers, packing in multi-dimensional images of the Shaivite abodes of God, preserved wonderfully over time". C. V. Aravind of the Deccan Herald stated that Balachander extracted an excellent performance from Chiranjeevi. He compared the film with other Telugu films such as Subhalekha (1982), Swayamkrushi and Aapadbandhavudu (1992) where Chiranjeevi was cast in "well-defined" character roles that "contrasted sharply with his image as a commercial entertainer".

=== Awards ===
At the 36th National Film Awards, Rudraveena won in three categories: Nargis Dutt Award for Best Feature Film on National Integration, Best Music Direction, and Best Male Playback Singer (Balasubrahmanyam). With this, it became the only Telugu film after Saptapadi (1981) to receive the Nargis Dutt award. It was also Ilaiyaraaja's third award after Sagara Sangamam (1983) and Sindhu Bhairavi. Sitaramasastri lost the Best Lyricist award with a difference of one vote.

Nandi Awards - 1988

- Best Dialogue Writer - Ganesh Patro
- Best Music Director - Ilaiyaraaja
- Best Audiographer - Pandurangam
- Special Jury Award - Nagendra Babu

== Legacy ==
Rudraveena is considered one of the cult films in the careers of Balachander and Shobana. In an interview with Rediff.com in April 1997, Chiranjeevi stated that he opted to act in Rudraveena for an image makeover. He added that despite its failure, the film made him happy as it had inspired many villages in Andhra Pradesh. During his tenure as the president of India, A. P. J. Abdul Kalam visited Chiranjeevi's Eye & Blood Bank (CEBB) in June 2006 and expressed his appreciation for the initiative; the actor recalled the day when he ruled out the climax of Rudraveena ever happening in real life.

Hindustan Times included Rudraveena in their 2015 list of 10 memorable films directed by Balachander. On Chiranjeevi's 60th birthday, Indo-Asian News Service included the film in their list of underrated performances by the actor. Koratala Siva's Srimanthudu (2015) starring Mahesh Babu and Shruti Haasan was compared with Rudraveena for its similarities on a thematic level (rural development and father-son conflict). Commenting on the same, Babu stated that Srimanthudu was more mainstream and commercial than realistic in its approach.
