= Sadha Nannu Nadipe =

2022 Telugu romantic comedy film

- Directed by: Lanka Pratheek Prem Karan
- Produced by: Lanka Karunakar Dass
- Starring: Lanka Pratheek Prem Karan; Vaishnavi Patwardhan; Nagendra Babu
- Cinematography: SD Jaan Ahmed
- Edited by: SR. Sekhar
- Music by: Prabhu Praveen
- Production company: Rahul Prem Movie Makers
- Release date: 24 June 2022
- Country: India
- Language: Telugu

Sadha Nannu Nadipe is a 2022 Indian Telugu-language romantic comedy film written and directed by Lanka Pratheek Prem Karan. The film stars Lanka Pratheek Prem Karan and Vaishnavi Patwardhan in the lead roles while Nagendra Babu and Ali play supporting roles. The film was released on 24 June 2022.

== Cast ==
- Lanka Pratheek Prem Karan as Michael Jackson "MJ"
- Vaishnavi Patwardhan as Samaya Hasini "Saha"
- Nagendra Babu as Dr. Sekhar
- Ali as Aaditya Bal Chandar Das "ABCD"
- Rajeev Kanakala as Dr. Rajeev
- Surya as Dr. Sharma
- Mahesh Achanta as Billa
- Sudarshan as Ranga
- Naveen as Ananthu

== Release ==
The film was theatrically released on 24 June 2022.

== Reception ==
A critic for Sakshi Post stated "Sadha Ninnu Nadipe is a decent entertainer and a one-time watch". Echoing the same, Aithagoni Raju of Asianet Telugu gave a rating of 2.5 out of 5 and praised Lanka Pratheek Prem Karan's work.
