= Preminchukundam Raa =

- Theatrical release poster
- Directed by: Jayanth C. Paranjee
- Written by: Screenplay & Dialogues: Paruchuri Brothers; Story: Deenraj
- Produced by: D. Suresh Babu
- Starring: Venkatesh; Anjala Zaveri
- Cinematography: K. Ravindra Babu
- Edited by: Marthand K. Venkatesh
- Music by: Songs: Mahesh Mahadevan (Note: Mahesh Mahadevan is credited for music. However, Mani Sharma composed 3 songs, "Meghale Thankindi", "Pellikala Vachesindhe", & "O Panaipothundi Babu."); Mani Sharma (Uncredited); Score: Mani Sharma
- Production company: Suresh Productions
- Release date: 9 May 1997
- Running time: 151 minutes
- Country: India
- Language: Telugu
- Box office: est. ₹30.15 crore

Preminchukundam Raa (transl. Come, Let's Love) is a 1997 Indian Telugu-language romantic action film directed by Jayanth C. Paranjee and produced by D. Suresh Babu under Suresh Productions. The film stars Venkatesh and Anjala Zaveri with music composed Mahesh Mahadevan. The plot follows a couple's love entangled in a region plagued by violence.

Preminchukundam Raa is considered to be one of the first films to portray the factionalism in the Rayalaseema region of Andhra Pradesh state. Released on 9 May 1997, the film recorded as block buster hit.

== Plot ==
Veerabhadraiah is a powerful factionist in Rayalaseema who is against love marriages. Sivudu his henchman; whose word is an ordinance to him. Sivudu says yes to Veerabhadraiah's every deed, even when he kills his father front of him. Reddappa a savage is the main opponent of Veerabhadraiah and both of them maintain bloodshed rivalry.

Parallelly, Giri a valor student at Hyderabad leads a merry life. Once he disputes with his colleagues, due to their threat his parents send him to Kurnool to his elder sister Vaani's residence where he falls for a beauty Kaveri neighbors to Giri's brother-in-law Chakrapani. Meanwhile, Giri's parents fix his engagement which he breaks-up and backs to Kurnool. starts hating him. Being incognizant of it, Kaveri shows abhorrence on him, but later realizes his true love.

Here as a flabbergast, Kaveri is daughter of Veerabhadraiah who is aware of the love affair and resents. Now, Giri reacts on Veerabhadraiah and takes Kaveri along with him. Veerabhadraiah sends his goons along with Sivudu in their chase. Giri and Kaveri reach Hyderabad, his parents reject their love because they are afraid of Veerabhadraiah, even SRK Master also curses them. Hence, Giri leaves the house and with his friends' help, makes their marriage arrangements. At the same time, Sivudu attacks them in which Giri is injured, Kaveri is separated and Sivudu forcibly taken her back to Rayalaseema.

Simultaneously, Chakrapani and Vaani arrive at Hyderabad who shots Giri and admits him in the hospital. At present, Giri's parents decide to talk to Veerabhadraiah and moves to Rayalaseema, whom he lock down. Immediately, Giri rushes to Rayalaseema where rescues Sivudu and his family from Reddappa. Therein, his words reforms Sivudu. At last, Giri protects his parents and proceeds along with Kaveri. In the chase while Veerabhadraiah is about to knock them, Sivudu obstructs his way and declares him as wrong, which makes him realize. Finally, Giri and Kaveri marry each other.

== Cast ==
- Venkatesh as Giridhar "Giri"
- Anjala Zaveri as Kaveri (voice dubbed by Shilpa)
- Jaya Prakash Reddy as Veerabhadraiah, Kaveri's father
- Srihari as Sivudu
- Ahuti Prasad as Kesava Rao
- Paruchuri Venkateswara Rao as SRK Master
- Chandra Mohan as Chakrapani, Giri's brother-in-law
- Gokina Rama Rao as Sivudu's father
- Raghunatha Reddy as Giri's father
- Kolla Ashok Kumar as Reddappa
- Banerjee as Reddappa's henchmen
- Jeeva as Samba
- Babu Mohan as Kavi
- Venu Madhav as Venu, Giri's friend
- Brahmanandam as Ramavadhani
- Gundu Hanumantha Rao as Paperboy
- Uttej as Imran, Giri's friend
- Annapurna as Giri's mother
- Sudha as Vaani, Giri's sister
- Rama Prabha as Bamma
- Rajitha as Indira
- Bangalore Padma as Satyavathi
- Krishnaveni
- Indu Anand as SRK's wife
- Banda Jyothi
- Kalpana Rai as Damayanthi
- Master Aanand Vardhan as Chinnu
- Baby Niharika as Pinky
- Alphonsa (special appearance in song)

== Production ==
Aishwarya Rai was the director's initial choice for the lead actress, but she was rejected as she was not yet an established actress. The role went to Anjala Zaveri.

== Soundtrack ==
Preminchukundam Raa

Soundtrack album by Mahesh Mahadevan Mani Sharma
- Released: 1997
- Recorded: 1997
- Genre: Soundtrack
- Length: 28:27
- Label: Aditya Music
- Producers: Mahesh Mahadevan; Mani Sharma

Music is composed by Mahesh Mahadevan, along with Mani Sharma. Mahadevan is credited for music but Sharma has composed three songs, "Meghale Thankindi", "Pellikala Vachesindhe", and "O Panaipothundi Babu." "Pellikala Vachesindhe" was inspired from "Yé ké yé ké", the 1987 international hit song by Guinean musician Mory Kanté. Music was released by Aditya Music.

Track-List
No.	Title	Lyrics	Music	Singer(s)	Length
1.	"Alachudu Premalokam"	Sirivennela Seetarama Sastry	Mahesh Mahadevan	S. P. Balasubrahmanyam, K. S. Chithra	4:06
2.	"Surya Keeritam"	Bhuvanachandra	Mahesh Mahadevan	S. P. Balasubrahmanyam, Anuradha Sriram	5:34
3.	"Meghale Thakindi"	Sirivennela Seetarama Sastry	Mani Sharma	S. P. Balasubrahmanyam, K. S. Chithra	4:21
4.	"Sambarala"	Bhuvanachandra	Mahesh Mahadevan	S. P. Balasubrahmanyam, K. S. Chithra, Sangeetha Sajith	5:31
5.	"Pellikala Vachesindhe"	Sirivennela Seetarama Sastry	Mani Sharma	Mano, K. S. Chithra, Swarnalatha	4:12
6.	"O Panaipothundi Babu"	Chandrabose	Mani Sharma	Mano	4:43
Total length:					28:27

== Reception ==
Preminchukundam Raa was the first Telugu film to run 100 days in more than 50 centres and it ran for 50 days in 57 centres.
