= Mogalthuru =

- Village
- Location in Andhra Pradesh, India Mogalthuru (India)
- Coordinates: 16.4167°N 81.6000°E
- Country: India
- State: Andhra Pradesh
- District: West Godavari

Languages
  - Official: Telugu
- Time zone: UTC+5:30 (IST)
- PIN: 534281
- Telephone code: 08814
- Vehicle registration: AP
- Nearest city: NARSAPURAM

Mogalthuru is a village in West Godavari district of the Indian state of Andhra Pradesh. It was a princely estate during the British rule. It was the Native village of Megastar Chiranjeevi

== Geography ==
Mogalthuru is located at 16.4167°N 81.6000°E. It has an average elevation of 1 meter (6 feet). NH 214A passes through the village.

== History ==
Mogalthuru is known for the ancient Kalidindi Zamindari clan and a mud fort connected to the ancient Vishnukundina dynasty. The Zamindari territory expands to West Godavari and parts of Krishna District. The biggest of the ten forts which has survived the ravages of time is the Mogalthuru Fort in which the family of the erstwhile kingdom still lives. Mogalthuru Old Name was KETAKIPURAM.

== Demographics ==
As of 2011 Census of India, Mogalthuru had a population of 24,189. The total population constituted of, 12,089 males, and 12,100 females with a sex ratio of 1,001 females per 1,000 males. 2,347 children were in the age group of 0–6 years, with the sex ratio of 987. The average literacy rate stood at 75.02%.

== Notable people ==
- Uppalapati Krishnam Raju, Telugu Film Actor, Rebel Star, Businessman, Politician, Producer
- Uppalapati Surya Narayana Raju, Telugu Film Producer
- Prabhas, Telugu Film Actor, Pan India Star
- Uppalapati Prabodh, Telugu Film Producer
- Konidela Chiranjeevi, Telugu Film Actor.
- Konidela Pawan Kalyan, Telugu Film Actor, Politician
