= Jayanth C. Paranjee =

Indian film director (born 1961)

- Born: 21 July 1957 (age 68); Bangalore, Mysore State, India
- Occupations: Film director; producer
- Years active: 1997−present

Jayanth C. Paranjee (born 21 July 1957) is an Indian film director known for his works predominantly in Telugu cinema.

== Early career ==
Jayanth C. Paranji was born and raised in Bangalore, his mother hailed from the city, and he spent his early years living near the Movieland Theatre in Gandhinagar. His father, a psychiatrist, traveled frequently, and Jayanth, along with his parents and three brothers, lived with his maternal grandmother. He completed his schooling at St. Joseph's Boys' School in Bangalore before the family relocated to Hyderabad when his father took a job there.

Jayanth's early interest in the arts began during his school years, where he directed and acted in a play based on Julius Caesar, a pivotal experience that led to his passion for theatre and visual media. He began directing well-known plays in English after he settled in Hyderabad. He started the English theater troupe Muses and was associated with another English theater group, Dramatic Circle Hyderabad. Despite his father's hopes for him to pursue medicine, Jayanth dropped out of college, where he was studying Zoology, to work in an ad agency, marking the start of his career in visual media.

He began his professional journey by creating corporate films and advertisements before transitioning to cinema. Then he switched over to directing Telugu serials for the television. He shot to fame when his serial Tenali Rama began to be telecast by Doordarshan. Shot in expensive sets, this serial quickly climbed to the number one spot. Jayanth got his break in 1996 when producer D. Suresh Babu offered him the opportunity to direct Preminchukondam Raa (1997), a film starring Venkatesh, which became a major success. Over the years, he has directed a limited number of films but is known for his impactful work in the industry.

== Personal life ==
Jayanth is married to Archana, an artist he met during his time in theatre. Their relationship faced challenges as Archana was engaged to another man at the time, but Jayanth courted her for five years, winning over her family. The story of their romance has drawn comparisons to the film Dilwale Dulhania Le Jayenge (1995), with Jayanth likening himself to the character Raj from the movie.

== Filmography ==
- Note: all films are in Telugu, unless otherwise noted.

Year	Film title	Notes
1997	Preminchukundam Raa	
1998	Bavagaru Bagunnara	
1998	Premante Idera	
1999	Ravoyi Chandamama	
2002	Takkari Donga	
2002	Eeswar	
2004	Lakshmi Narasimha	
2004	Shankar Dada M.B.B.S	
2004	Sakhiya	
2005	Allari Pidugu	
2011	Teen Maar	
2014	Ninnindale	Kannada film
2017	Jayadev	
