= Chiranjeevi =

Indian actor and philanthropist (born 1955)

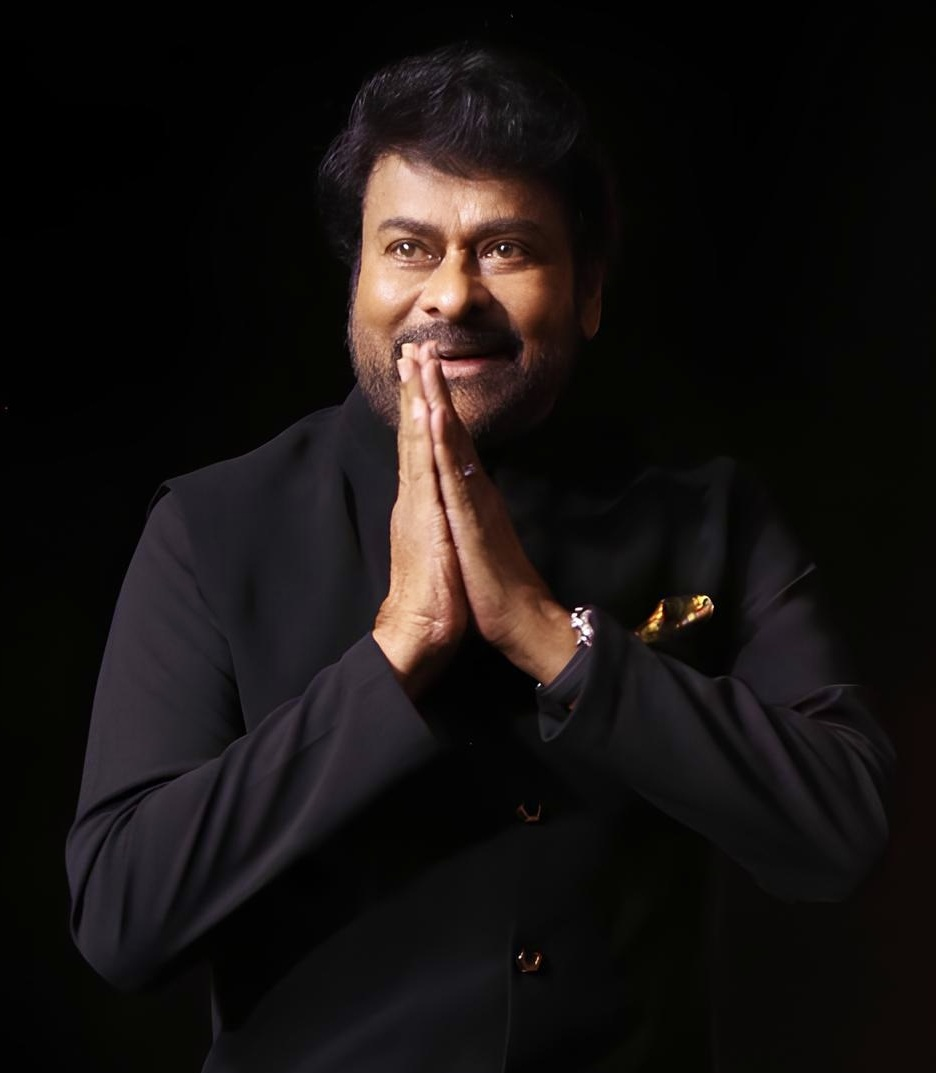
- Chiranjeevi in 2024

Union Minister of State (Independent Charge) for Tourism
- In office 27 October 2012 – 26 May 2014
- Prime Minister: Manmohan Singh
- Preceded by: Subodh Kant Sahay
- Succeeded by: Shripad Yasso Naik

Member of Parliament, Rajya Sabha
- In office 3 April 2012 – 2 April 2018
- Preceded by: Raashid Alvi
- Succeeded by: Vemireddy Prabhakar Reddy
- Constituency: Andhra Pradesh

Member of Legislative Assembly, Andhra Pradesh
- In office 16 May 2009 – 6 February 2011
- Preceded by: M. Venkataramana
- Succeeded by: Bhumana Karunakar Reddy
- Constituency: Tirupati

Personal details
- Born: Konidela Sivasankara Varaprasad; 22 August 1955 (age 71) Mogalthur, Andhra State, India (present-day Andhra Pradesh, India)
- Other political affiliations: Indian National Congress; Praja Rajyam Party
- Spouse: Surekha (m. 1980)
- Children: 3, including Ram Charan
- Relatives: See Konidela–Allu family
- Education: Sri Y N College; Madras Film Institute
- Occupation: Actor; politician; television host
- Awards: Padma Vibhushan (2024); Padma Bhushan (2006); Full list
- Nickname: Mega Star

Konidela Chiranjeevi (/ˌtʃɪrənˈdʒiːvi/; born Konidela Sivasankara Varaprasad; 22 August 1955) is an Indian actor, philanthropist and former politician known for his work in Telugu cinema. Known as Mega Star, he is widely regarded as one of the most successful and influential actors in the history of Indian cinema. He is also celebrated as one of the finest dancers in Indian cinema. He has received numerous honours, including the Padma Bhushan in 2006 and the Padma Vibhushan in 2024 from the Government of India, as well as the IFFI Indian Film Personality of the Year Award in 2022. His other accolades include the Raghupathi Venkaiah Award, three Nandi Awards, and nine Filmfare Awards South, including the Lifetime Achievement Award and the Honorary Award. In 2013, CNN-IBN recognized him as one of "the men who changed the face of the Indian Cinema". In 2024, he was honoured with a Guinness World Record as the most prolific actor-dancer in the Indian film industry.

Chiranjeevi made his acting debut in 1978, initially gaining recognition for his supporting, anti-hero, and antagonist roles. He later transitioned to lead roles with notable success. His breakthrough came with the 1983 film Khaidi, which became the highest-grossing Telugu film at the time and established him as a leading star in the industry. Throughout the 1980s and early 1990s, Chiranjeevi starred in various record grossers like Pasivadi Pranam (1987), Yamudiki Mogudu (1988), Attaku Yamudu Ammayiki Mogudu (1989), Jagadeka Veerudu Athiloka Sundari (1990), Gang Leader (1991), and Gharana Mogudu (1992). Notably, Gharana Mogudu was the first South Indian film to earn over ₹10 crore in distributor share, prompting The Week magazine to label him "Bigger than Bachchan" and "the new money machine."

For his role in Aapadbandhavudu (1992), Chiranjeevi was paid ₹1.25 crore, making him the highest-paid actor in India at the time and the first Indian actor to command a remuneration in excess of ₹1 crore for a film. During this period, he received widespread critical acclaim for his performances in Swayamkrushi (1987) and Rudraveena (1988), showcasing his versatility as an actor who excelled in both commercially and critically acclaimed films. Notably, Swayamkrushi was screened at the Moscow International Film Festival, while Rudraveena, which he co-produced, won the National Film Award for Best Feature Film on National Integration. Following a series of unsuccessful ventures in the mid-1990s, Chiranjeevi made a comeback with Hitler (1997) and continued to dominate the box office with films, including Master (1997), Choodalani Vundi (1998), Sneham Kosam (1999), Annayya (2000), Indra (2002), Tagore (2003), Shankar Dada M.B.B.S. (2004) and Stalin (2006).

On 2 October 1998, Chiranjeevi established the Chiranjeevi Charitable Trust, which operates the largest blood and eye banks in the Telugu states. The trust has restored eyesight to over 9,000 individuals through cornea transplants and provides 79% of collected blood free to the poor. It has received several accolades, including the "Best Voluntary Blood Bank Award" from the Government of Andhra Pradesh for five consecutive years from 2002 to 2006. In 2002, he was honoured with the Samman Award by the Income Tax Department, for being the highest income tax payer in the profession category for the assessment year 1999–2000.

In 2008, Chiranjeevi founded the Praja Rajyam Party and led it in the 2009 Andhra Pradesh elections, where it won 18 seats and secured over 16% of the vote, making it the third-largest party in the state. The party merged with the Indian National Congress in 2011. Chiranjeevi served as a Rajya Sabha MP from 2012 to 2018 and was appointed Minister of Tourism in the central cabinet of India in October 2012, holding the position until May 2014. After a hiatus from cinema, he returned with the blockbuster Khaidi No. 150 (2017), followed by hugely successful films, Waltair Veerayya (2023) and Mana Shankara Vara Prasad Garu (2026).

== Early and personal life ==
Chiranjeevi was born as Konidela Sivasankara Varaprasad Rao on 22 August 1955 in a Telugu family to Konidela Venkata Rao and Anjana Devi in Mogalthur, West Godavari district of Andhra Pradesh. His father Konidela Venkata Rao worked as a constable and was transferred on a regular basis. He spent his childhood in his native village with his grandparents.

Chiranjeevi did his schooling in Nidadavolu, Gurazala, Bapatla, Ponnur, Mangalagiri and Mogalthur. He was an NCC cadet and had participated in the Republic Day Parade in New Delhi in the early 1970s. He was interested in acting from a young age. He did his Intermediate at C. S. R. Sarma College in Ongole. After graduating with a degree in commerce from Sri Y N College at Narsapuram, Chiranjeevi moved to Chennai and joined the Madras Film Institute in 1976 to pursue a career in acting.

On 20 February 1980, Chiranjeevi married Surekha, the daughter of Telugu comic actor Allu Ramalingaiah. They have two daughters, Sushmita and Sreeja, and a son, Ram Charan, also an actor in Telugu cinema. Chiranjeevi has two brothers, Nagendra Babu, a film producer and actor, and Pawan Kalyan, an actor-politician who is Deputy Chief Minister of Andhra Pradesh and founder of Jana Sena, a regional political party. Allu Aravind, his brother-in-law, is a film producer. Chiranjeevi is the uncle to actors Allu Arjun, Allu Sirish, Varun Tej, Niharika, Sai Dharam Tej, and Panja Vaisshnav Tej.

== Acting career ==
=== 1978–1981: Early career ===
Since his family worshipped Anjaneya (Hanuman), a Hindu deity, his mother advised him to take the screen name "Chiranjeevi", meaning "Immortal", a reference to the belief of Hanuman living forever.

Chiranjeevi started his film career with Punadhirallu (1979). However, his first released film was Pranam Khareedu (1978). Mana Voori Pandavulu (1978), directed by Bapu, gave Chiranjeevi recognition from the Telugu audience. He played a small role in Tayaramma Bangarayya (1979). He played the anti-hero in films I Love You (1979) and K. Balachander's Idi Katha Kaadu (1979), starring Kamal Haasan.

In a remake of the Tamil film Avargal (1977), Chiranjeevi portrayed the character played by Rajinikanth in the original. In 1979, Chiranjeevi had eight major film releases and then 14 films in the following year. In 1981, he played lead antagonist in works such as Mosagadu, Rani Kasula Rangamma, 47 Natkal /47 Rojulu, Nyayam Kavali and Ranuva Veeran.

=== 1982–1986: Breakthrough with leading roles ===
Chiranjeevi began to appear in leading roles with films such as Intlo Ramayya Veedhilo Krishnayya (1982), directed by Kodi Ramakrishna, which was a hit at the box office. Later, he starred in Subhalekha (1982), directed by K. Viswanath, which dealt with the social malady of the dowry system. It brought him his first Filmfare Award for Best Actor – Telugu and Viswanath's third Filmfare Award for Best Director – Telugu. In 1982, he also appeared in movies such as Idi Pellantara, Sitadevi, Tingu Rangadu, Bandhalu Anubandhalu and Mondi Ghatam. He acted in multi-star movies such as Patnam Vachina Pativrathalu and Billa Ranga, and later appeared in Manchu Pallaki.

Khaidi (1983) was a box office success and Chiranjeevi attained stardom with this movie. In 1984, he continued doing action films. A series of box office hits at this time include; Mantri Gari Viyyankudu, Sangharshana, Goonda, Challenge, Hero, Donga, Jwala, Adavi Donga, Kondaveeti Raja, Rakshasudu. In 1985, he received his second Filmfare Award for Best Actor – Telugu for his performance in Vijetha.

=== 1987–2007: Commercial success ===
Chiranjeevi received his first Nandi Award for Best Actor for Swayamkrushi (1987), directed by K. Viswanath. Pasivadi Pranam (1987), Yamudiki Mogudu (1988) and Manchi Donga (1988) also did well at the box office. He co-produced and acted in Rudraveena (1988), which won the Nargis Dutt Award for Best Feature Film on National Integration, and the Nandi Special Jury Award. The title "Megastar" appeared for the first time in the title cards of the 1988 release Marana Mrudangam, marking its association with Chiranjeevi. During the shoot of Marana Mrudangam, Chiranjeevi was poisoned by a fan who attempted to get closer to him. The incident was recalled by Chiranjeevi in 2023, who took it lightly as an act of misguided admiration.

He then experimented with Jagadeka Veerudu Athiloka Sundari (1990), a fantasy film directed by K. Raghavendra Rao and produced by Aswini Dutt. Other notable works during this period include Kondaveeti Donga (1990), released in 70 mm format with 6-Track stereophonic sound, the cowboy film Kodama Simham (1990), and the social problem action film Gang Leader (1991). These films were major box-office successes and established Chiranjeevi as the "Boss of Telugu cinema". The 1992 film Gharana Mogudu was the first South Indian and Telugu film to collect over ₹10 crore in distributor share at the box office. The film was screened at the 1993 International Film Festival of India in the mainstream section.

Chiranjeevi's Bollywood performances were appreciated in Pratibandh and Aaj Ka Goonda Raaj. For his role in Aapadbandhavudu (1992), he received his second Nandi Award for Best Actor and third Filmfare Award for Best Actor – Telugu. The mid-1990s saw a career dip for Chiranjeevi with box office duds such as S. P. Parasuram, The Gentleman, Big Boss and Rikshavodu. There were exceptions, such as Muta Mestri, which fetched him a fourth Filmfare Award for Best Actor – Telugu; Mugguru Monagallu and Alluda Majaka were also successful. In 1996, he appeared in a guest role in the Kannada film Sipayi. After a brief lull, Chiranjeevi bounced back with Hitler, Master, Bavagaru Bagunnara?, Choodalani Vundi and Sneham Kosam, for which he received his fifth Filmfare Award for Best Actor – Telugu. In 1999, Chiranjeevi was to appear in a Hollywood production directed by Dushan Garsi, and produced by Rameshkrishna Murthi. The Telugu version was directed by Suresh Krissna. The movie, which was titled The Return of the Thief of Baghdad, had its filming suspended for undisclosed reasons.

Chiranjeevi's new decade started with Annayya (2000). After a brief gap, Chiranjeevi starred in Indra, released in 2002, which broke all his previous box office records of Tollywood and won him his third Nandi Award for Best Actor and sixth Filmfare Award for Best Actor – Telugu. After that, he appeared in films with an underlying message and a social cause, including Tagore; Shankar Dada M.B.B.S., for which he won his seventh and latest Filmfare Award for Best Actor – Telugu; and Stalin. He was awarded the Filmfare Special Award – South in 2006 and the Filmfare Lifetime Achievement Award – South at the 58th Filmfare Awards South in 2011 for his contributions to the film industry.

=== 2008–2016: Hiatus in film career ===
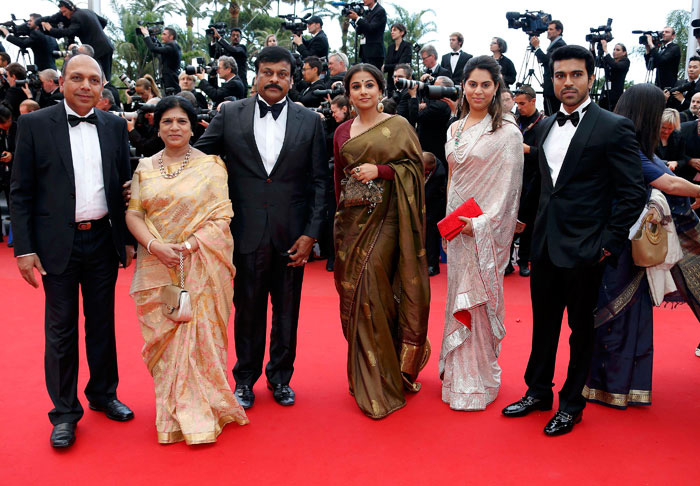
Chiranjeevi, Vidya Balan, and Ram Charan at "Incredible India" event in the 2013 Cannes Film Festival

Following his last film in the lead role, 2007's Shankar Dada Zindabad, Chiranjeevi did not star in any film for approximately 10 years, during which he embarked on his political career. He was elected to the Andhra Pradesh Legislative Assembley in 2009, and then to the Rajya Sabha in 2012. In the 2012 Indian Cabinet reshuffle he was made Minister of State for Tourism. During these 10 years, his appearances in films were limited to cameo roles. He appeared as himself in two films, starring his son Ram Charan, namely Magadheera (2009) and Bruce Lee: The Fighter (2015). He also narrated Varudu (2010) and Rudhramadevi (2015).

=== 2017–present: Comeback ===
From 2013 onwards, he was on the lookout for the right script to mark his comeback into cinema, in what would coincidentally happen to be his 150th film as an actor. A year following the release of the successful 2014 Tamil film Kaththi, Chiranjeevi chose to remake that film in Telugu as his comeback film. The remake, titled Khaidi No. 150, directed by V. V. Vinayak, was released during the Sankranti holiday in 2017, about six months short of a decade following Shankar Dada Zindabad, to positive reviews. Critics have singled out Chiranjeevi in particular, praising him for both his performance and appearance, especially following a decade of absence from cinema. The movie collected ₹41.75 crore on its opening day and grossed ₹164 crore in its lifetime. In 2019, he starred in his first period film Sye Raa Narasimha Reddy based on the life of Uyyalawada Narasimha Reddy; it was directed by Surender Reddy. The movie made on a budget more than ₹200–270 crore, grossed more than ₹240 crore (equivalent to ₹367 crore or US$39 million in 2026) in its theatrical run.

Chiranjeevi had two releases in 2022. His first film was Acharya directed by Koratala Siva co-starring Chiranjeevi's son Ram Charan. His second release was GodFather directed by Mohan Raja. The film had Salman Khan in an extended cameo role and was largely successful. GodFather subsequently released on Netflix.

Also in 2022, Chiranjeevi's performance as Batman in the song "Vana Gadiyaramlo" from Muta Mestri went vial, boosting global interest Chiranjeevi and in the performance.

Chiranjeevi then starred in the 2023 film Waltair Veerayya directed by Bobby Kolli which released during the Sankranti festival. The film also starred Ravi Teja in an important role, reuniting them on screen after 23 years since the 2000 film Annayya. The film met huge commercial success. Waltair Veerayya later released on Netflix for streaming. In the same year, he also appeared in Bhola Shankar, a remake of the 2015 Tamil blockbuster, Vedalam. However, it opened to unanimously negative reviews and was a huge disaster at the box-office.

He announced his next film, Vishwambhara, with director Mallidi Vassishta.

In February 2025, Chiranjeevi faced criticism for remarks at the promotional event for Brahma Anandam, where he joked about feeling like a "ladies' hostel warden" surrounded by his granddaughters and expressed a wish for his son Ram Charan to have a son to continue the family legacy. The comments were criticised as sexist and sparked public debate over gender bias and traditional inheritance expectations.

== Other work ==
Chiranjeevi is one of the co-owners of the Indian Super League club Kerala Blasters FC.

=== Television career ===
Chiranjeevi made his debut as a Television host with the fourth season of Meelo Evaru Koteeswarudu. The first episode of the fourth season was aired on 13 February 2017 on Star Maa. The game show is a Telugu-language adaptation of Who Wants to Be a Millionaire?.

== Political career ==
In August 2008, Chiranjeevi launched his political party, Praja Rajyam Party, in Tirupati, Andhra Pradesh. At the launch, he stated that social justice was the main agenda of his party. In the 2009 Andhra Pradesh Legislative Assembly elections, the party won 18 of the 294 seats and secured a vote share of over 16%. He contested from Tirupati and Palakollu constituencies winning in Tirupati but losing out in Palakollu, in West Godavari district.

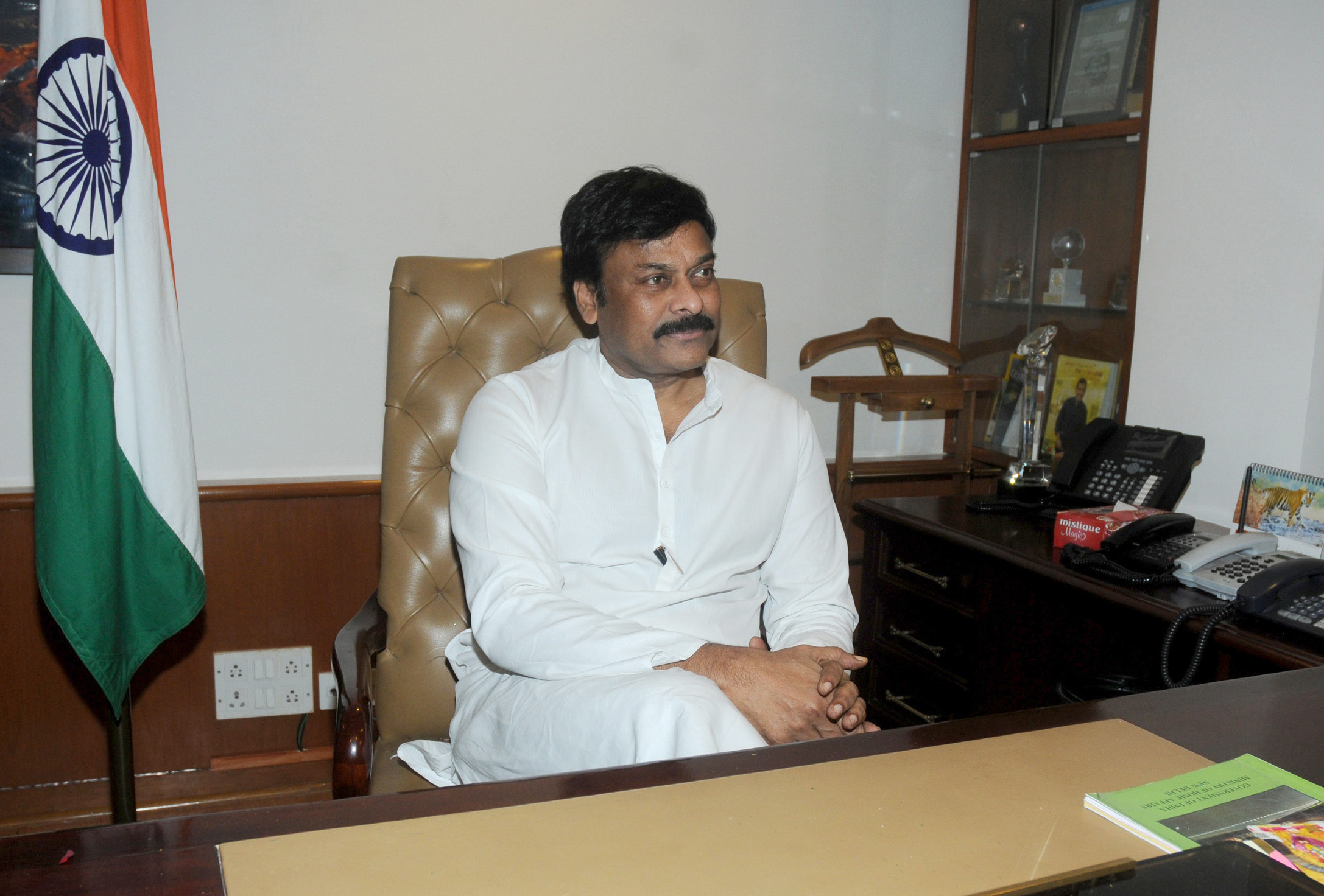
Chiranjeevi taking charge as the Minister of State (Independent Charge) for Tourism, in New Delhi in 2012

On 6 February 2011, the Praja Rajyam Party merged with the Indian National Congress after two weeks of talks with Congress President Sonia Gandhi. The merger was influenced by the Congress party's concerns over a no-confidence motion in the Andhra Pradesh state assembly, spurred by the rise of Y. S. Jagan Mohan Reddy's YSR Congress Party and the ongoing Telangana agitation. On 29 March 2012, Chiranjeevi was nominated to the Rajya Sabha, where he was elected and took his oath as a member on 3 April. Later that year, on 28 October, he was sworn in as the Union Minister of State (Independent Charge) for Tourism. In 2013, Chiranjeevi inaugurated the Incredible India Exhibition, a collaboration between the Ministry of Tourism and the Ministry of Information and Broadcasting, at the 66th Cannes Film Festival. He also represented Incredible India at the 14th IIFA Awards ceremony held in Macau that same year.

After the split of the state of Andhra Pradesh leaving the residuary state with huge debt and little revenue in June 2014, most members of the Andhra Pradesh wing of Congress party left in protest. Chiranjeevi, however, remained with Congress and campaigned for it as chairman of Election Campaign Committee for 2014 parliamentary and assembly elections in the residual state of Andhra Pradesh. However, he refrained from contesting in elections. There was also speculation that he did not campaign wholeheartedly due to the one-sided decision taken to split Andhra Pradesh. His younger brother, Pawan Kalyan, a former Praja Rajyam Party youth wing leader, launched his own political party, Jana Sena Party, and campaigned vigorously against Congress and in favour of Telugu Desam Party and Bharatiya Janata Party. Due to the strong anti-Congress sentiment prevailing in Andhra Pradesh, its candidates were defeated in all parliamentary and state assembly seats of Andhra Pradesh.

Since the 2014 elections, he has stayed away from active politics and since then, has not attended any meetings of the Congress party, on a regional or national level. His tenure as a Rajya Sabha member ended in April 2018. Although he is currently not active in politics, he was issued with a new All India Congress Committee identity card in 2022 leading to the speculation of his political comeback.

== Humanitarian work ==
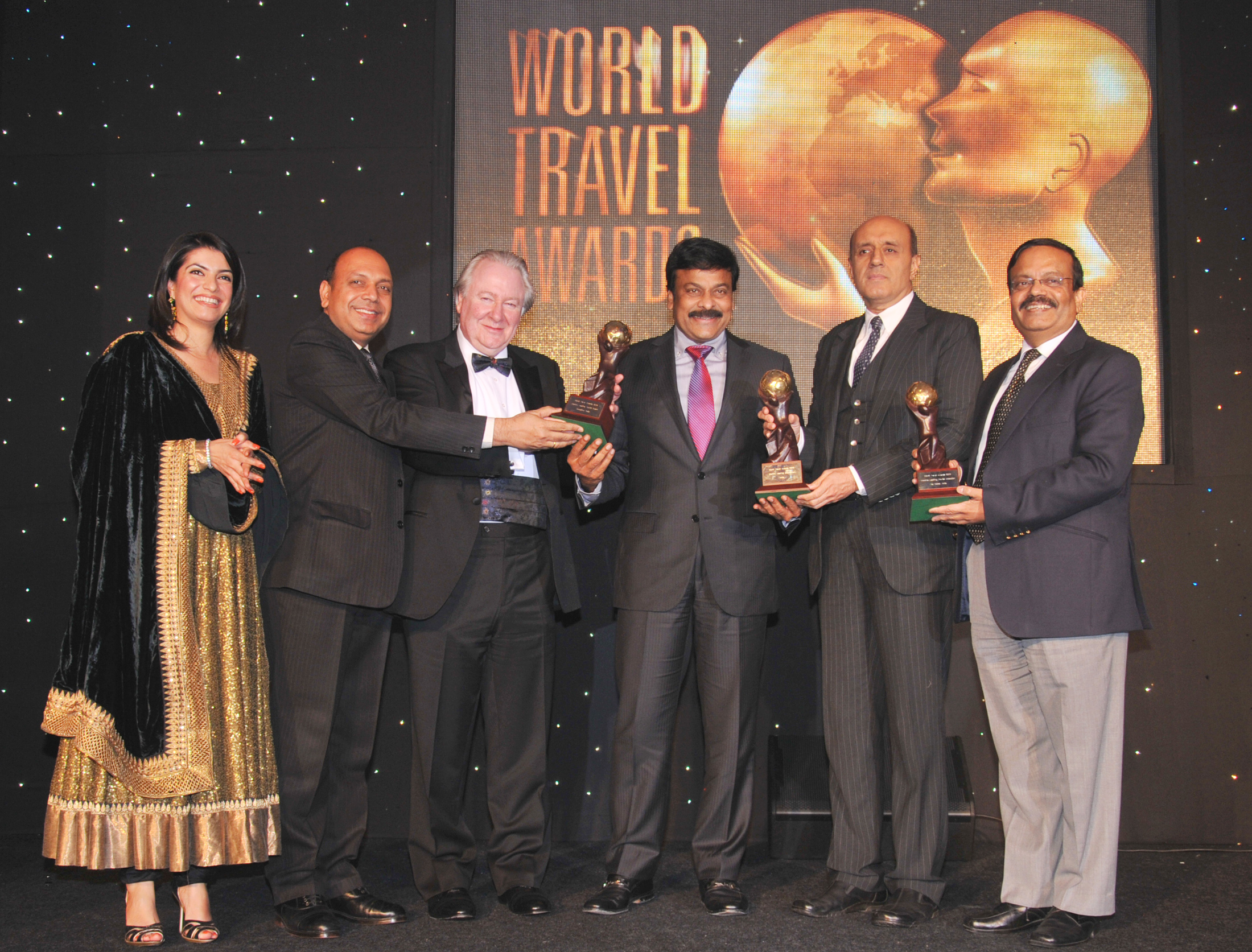
Chiranjeevi at the World Travel Awards, 2012

Chiranjeevi established the Chiranjeevi Charitable Trust (CCT) on 2 October 1998, with the motto that no one should lose their life due to a lack of blood. The trust includes a blood bank and an eye bank and is the largest recipient of blood and eye donations in Andhra Pradesh. As of September 2022, CCT has collected over 930,000 units of blood, with 70% of it provided to the poor free of charge. It has restored eyesight to over 9,060 individuals through 4,580 cornea transplants, and more than 350,000 people have pledged their eyes to CCT. The trust has received several accolades, including the "Best Voluntary Blood Bank Award" from the Andhra Pradesh State Government for five consecutive years from 2002 to 2006. On 10 June 2006, the then President of India, A. P. J. Abdul Kalam, inaugurated the Chiranjeevi Charitable Foundation (CCF) at Jubilee Hills in Hyderabad. Chiranjeevi has supported the trust's activities through his earnings, including those from television commercials and promotions.

After Chiranjeevi's entry into politics, actor couple Rajasekhar and Jeevitha made allegations against the Chiranjeevi Blood Bank, accusing it of engaging in financial irregularities. In response, the Andhra Pradesh state government formed a high-level committee to investigate the claims. The committee, guided by the project director of the AP State AIDS Control Society and composed of experts from finance and technical fields, thoroughly examined records related to blood collection and disposal, blood grouping, screening, sterilization, medical waste management, conducted camps, blood expiry, quality control, storage facilities, and equipment purchases. Following the investigation, the blood bank was cleared of any wrongdoing. Authorities confirmed that the blood bank operates in full compliance with the guidelines set by the National AIDS Control Organization (NACO). In 2023, a Nampally court sentenced Rajasekhar and Jeevitha to one year in jail and imposed a fine of ₹5 lakh for their defamatory remarks against the blood bank. The couple, however, obtained bail.

In May 2021, Chiranjeevi set up oxygen banks and ambulances across Andhra Pradesh and Telangana to meet the needs of patients affected by COVID-19.

== Awards, honours and recognitions ==
Director K. Balachander said, "Chiranjeevi has both Kamal Haasan and Rajinikanth in him. Not only can he do action, he can also act." Chiranjeevi received the Padma Bhushan, the third highest civilian honour in India in the year 2006. In the same year, he was awarded an Honorary Doctorate by Andhra University for his contribution to films and his social service through the Chiranjeevi Charitable Trust. He is a nine-time winner of Filmfare Awards South and a three-time winner of Nandi Awards. He was the first actor from South India to be invited to the Oscars ceremony in 1987. In 2013, CNN-IBN recognized him as one of "the men who changed the face of the Indian Cinema". In 2014, he was awarded International Face of Indian Cinema at the 3rd South Indian International Movie Awards by Tengku Adnan Tengku Mansor. In 2024, he was honoured with a Guinness World Record as the most prolific actor-dancer in the Indian film industry for performing more than 24,000 dance moves in 537 songs in 156 films in a career spanning over 45 years.

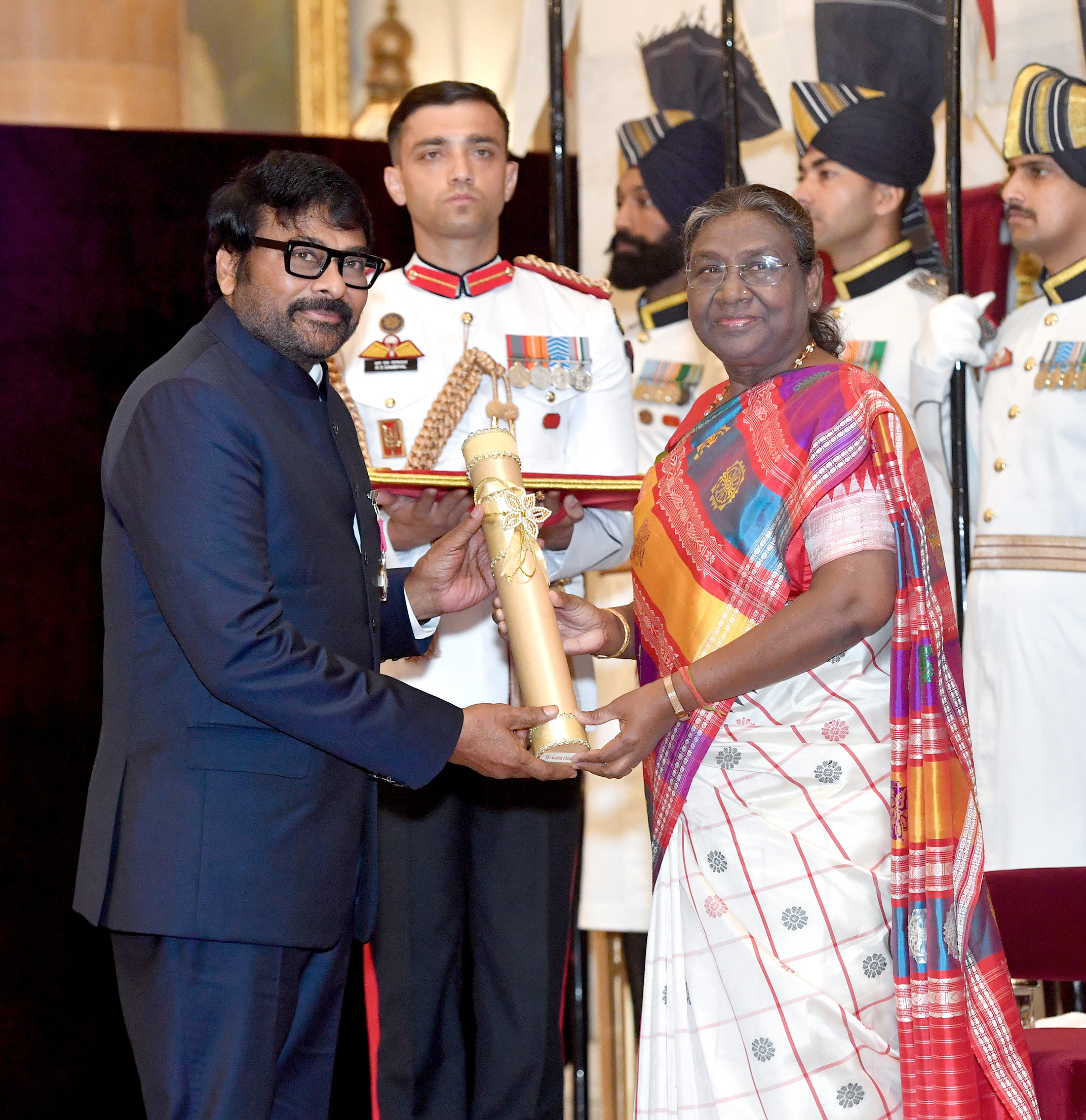
The President, Smt. Droupadi Murmu presenting the Padma Vibhushan Award to Shri Konidela Chiranjeevi at the Civil Investiture Ceremony-II at Rashtrapati Bhavan, in New Delhi on May 09, 2024.

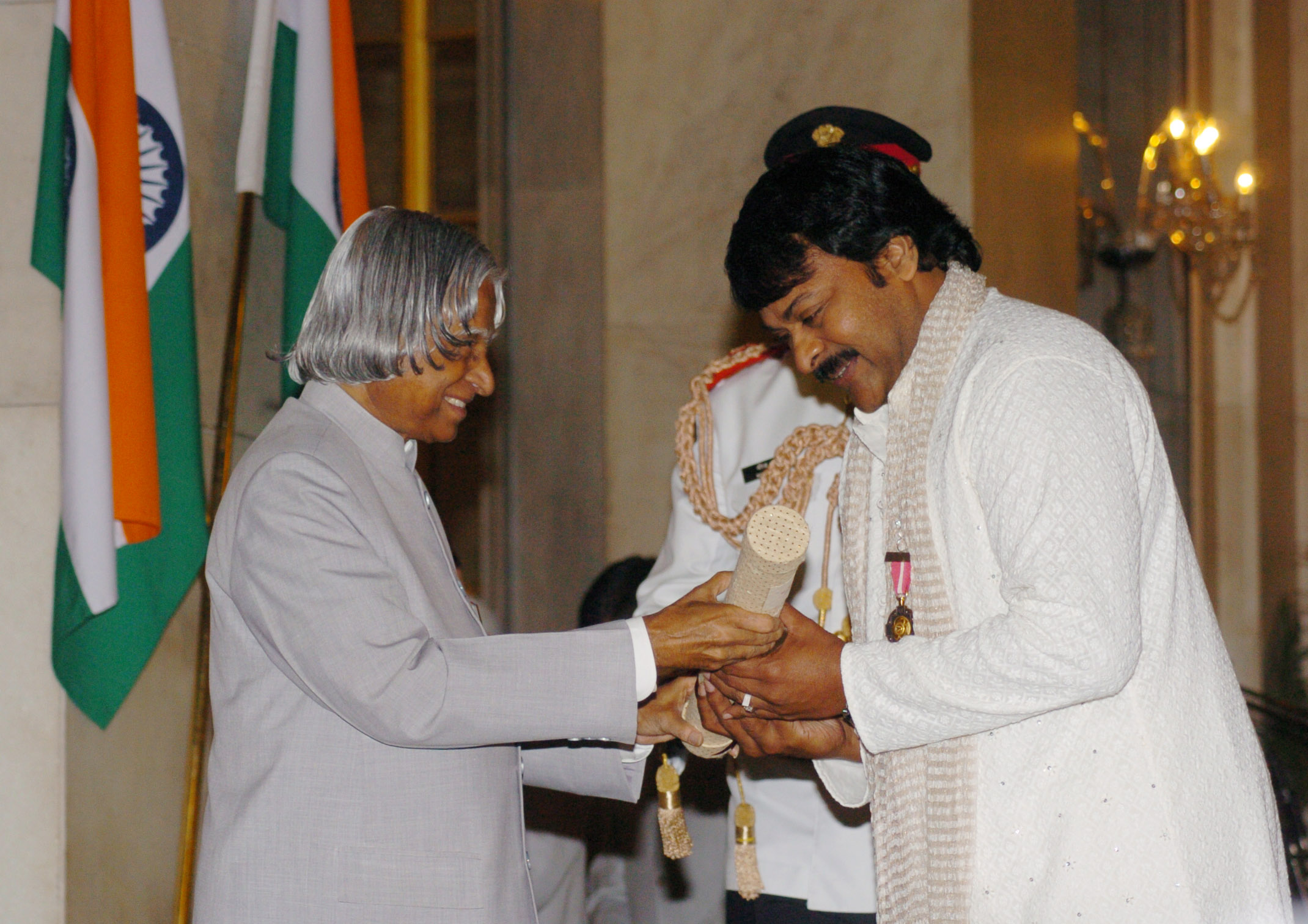
Chiranjeevi receiving Padma Bhushan from A. P. J. Abdul Kalam, the then President of India in 2006

=== Civilian honours ===
Year	Award	From	Ref
2006	Padma Bhushan	Government of India	
2024	Padma Vibhushan	Government of India	

=== National honours ===
- 2022 – IFFI Indian Film Personality of the Year Award
- 2024 – ANR National Award He was given this by Amitabh Bachchan at the ceremony in October.

=== State honours ===
- 2016 – Raghupathi Venkaiah Award from the Government of Andhra Pradesh

=== Acting honours ===
Filmfare Awards South

Year	Category	Film	Result	Ref.
1982	Best Actor – Telugu	Subhalekha	Won	
1985	Best Actor – Telugu	Vijetha	Won	
1992	Best Actor – Telugu	Aapadbandhavudu	Won	
1993	Best Actor – Telugu	Muta Mestri	Won	
1999	Best Actor – Telugu	Sneham Kosam	Won	
2002	Best Actor – Telugu	Indra	Won	
2004	Best Actor – Telugu	Shankar Dada MBBS	Won	
2006	Special Award – South	Legends (Honorary Award)	Won	
2010	Lifetime Achievement Award – South	Outstanding Contributions	Won	
2023	Best Actor – Telugu	GodFather	Nominated	
2024	Best Actor – Telugu	Waltair Veerayya	Nominated	

Nandi Awards

Year	Category	Film	Result	Ref.
1987	Best Actor	Swayam Krushi	Won	
1992	Best Actor	Aapadbandhavudu	Won	
2002	Best Actor	Indra	Won	
2016	Raghupathi Venkaiah Award	Honorary Award	Won	

Cinema Express Awards

- Best Actor – Swayam Krushi (1987)
- Chevalier Sivaji Ganesan Award

CineMAA Awards

- CineMAA Award for Best Actor - Male – Indra (2003)

Santosham Film Awards

- Best Actor – Khaidi No. 150 (2017)
- Best Actor – Shankar Dada M.B.B.S. (2004)
- Best Actor – Tagore (2003)

Zee Cine Awards Telugu

- Best Actor – Sye Raa Narasimha Reddy (2019)

Other honours

- 2006 – Honorary doctorate from the Andhra University
- SIIMA Awards - International Face of Indian Cinema – (2014)
- 2024 – IIFA Utsavam Outstanding Achievement in Indian Cinema

== See also ==
- List of Indian actors
- List of dancers
