= Sundar K. Vijayan =

Indian film director

- Born: 16 August 1960 (age 66); Tamil Nadu, India
- Occupations: Actor; Film director; screenwriter
- Years active: 1986–present
- Spouse: Kamini
- Parent: K. Vijayan (father)

Sundar K. Vijayan is an Indian film and television series director, who has directed Tamil language content. The son of director K. Vijayan, Sundar began his career in films in the late 1980s, before prioritising television commitments in the 2000s.

== Career ==
In the 1980s, Sundar assisted his father K. Vijayan at the age of 16 in films like Sattam, Vidhi, Mangamma Sabadham and Osai. He worked as a co-director for Viduthalai directing the portions of Rajinikanth and Vishnuvardhan. Producer K. Balaji who was impressed with his work in Bandham offered him to direct a film for his production company. He made his directorial debut with Revathi at the age of 18. Since Revathi was well received, he then directed Velicham with Karthik which did averagely at box-office. He was closely associated with actress Ranjini in the late 1980s. His father Vijayan died during the making of En Rathathin Rathame, so Sundar had to step in as director and completed the remaining portions of the film. After making Ennarugil Nee Irundhal, Vijayan did not receive further opportunities to direct films. With the advice of his relative, he shifted to television and made his first television series Paarvaigal starring Silk Smitha for Sun TV. His serial Madisar Mami did well which led to further opportunities for Sundar to direct many serials in television. He made many successful serials such as Jannal, Alaigal, Annamalai, Selvi and Arasi.

Vijayan also played a pivotal role in introducing actor Samuthirakani into Tamil cinema, by hiring him on as a copywriter during the 1990s. A number of directors, including Venu Arvind and Premsai, apprenticed under him during their period of training.

In the 2000s, Vijayan collaborated with a number of lead actresses including Radhika, Khushboo, Amala, Devayani and Meena for primetime television serials. By 2005, he had directed over 1500 episodes. He was awarded a Kalaimamani award in 2009 for his work on Tamil television.

== Filmography ==
=== Films ===
Year	Film	Notes
1986	Revathi	
1987	Velicham	
1989	En Rathathin Rathame	
1991	Ennarukil Nee Irunthal	

=== Television ===
Year	Serial	Channel
1998	Jannal - Adutha Veetu Kavithaigal	Sun TV/Raj TV
1999	Guhan	Raj TV
2000	Kadavulukku Kobam Vandhadhu	DD Podhigai
2001	Oonjal	Vijay TV
2001–2003	Alaigal	Sun TV
2003–2005	Annamalai	Sun TV
2003–2004	Kungumam	Sun TV
2005–2006	Selvi	Sun TV
2006	Lakshmi	Sun TV
2008–2009	Namma Kudumbam	Kalaignar TV
2009	Thangamma Purushan	Kalaignar TV
2012–2013	Muthaaram	
2014-2015	Uyirmei	Zee Tamil
2015–2016	Yazhini	IBC Tamil
2016	Vinnaithaandi Varuvaayaa	Vijay TV
2019	Lakshmi Stores	Sun TV
2020	Chithi 2	Sun TV
