= Alaigal (TV series) =

Indian Tamil soap opera

- Genre: Drama
- Screenplay by: Devi Bala; Saiprakash K. Vijayan; Dialogues: Devi Bala; Saiprakash K. Vijayan
- Story by: Devi Bala
- Directed by: Sundhar K. Vijayan
- Starring: Venu Arvind; Jayachitra; Vadivukkarasi; Sri Durga / Reshma; Yuvasri; Absar; A. L. Raghavan; Rajesh; M. N. Nambiar; S. N. Lakshmi; Kavithalaya Krishnan; Vanitha Krishnachandran; Manjari; Alaigal Rani; M. S. Bhaskar
- Theme music composer: Dhina
- Opening theme: "Suttrum Bhoomi"
- Composer: Kiran
- Country of origin: India
- Original language: Tamil
- No. of episodes: 403

Production
- Producer: Vikatan Televistas Pvt. Ltd
- Cinematography: Pons Chandra
- Running time: approx. 15 minutes

Original release
- Network: Sun TV
- Release: 29 October 2001 – 23 May 2003

Alaigal (transl. Tides/Waves) is a 2001 Indian Tamil-language soap opera on Sun TV. It is a prime time serial. This show had an ensemble cast with Venu Arvind, Jayachitra, Vadivukkarasi, Sri Durga, Reshma, Yuvasri, Viji Chandrasekhar, Absar, S. N. Lakshmi, M.N. Nambiar, Kavithalaya Krishnan, Vanitha Krishnachandran, Manjari, Alaigal Rani, M. S. Bhaskar, Nizhalgal Ravi, Mohan Vaidya, Murali Kumar, Rajesh, Alaigal Rani, Vishwa, Daniel Balaji and Raghav. The show is produced by Vikatan Televistas Pvt. Ltd and director by Sundar K Vijayan. It aired every Monday to Friday.

== Plot ==
Chandrasekar and Kalyani are the parents of three children: Kannan, Vijay and Raji. Chandrasekar had an elder brother. After the death of the latter, their three children are orphaned and stay with Chandrasekhar. Ramu, the eldest of the three, is a married to sita, a woman of virtue. The couple, however, is treated like unpaid servants by Kalyani. The second one is Gayatri, who works as a teacher in a school. The youngest is Anand, a press photographer. Kalyani hates the three and makes them dance to her tunes.

At this stage, the character Ranga a notorious, anti-social element is introduced. He is shocked at seeing Kalyani in a shop. The very reason for Rangs's turning an anti-social is Kalyani. He decided to take revenge on her now and shatter her family. He arranges for a drama, which unfolds as below. Ranga and Gayatri get married in a temple. Gayatri goes to live with Ranga. Gayatri, in her new home, encounters the other side of Ranga. He injects steroids, instead of insulin, to her and thereby tarnishes her reputation in society. At the same time, he continues to play the role of saviour at Vijay's family tactfully. Ranga hires Murali, makes the latter 'prove' his extra-marital connections with Gayatri.

The family fall into the trap and curse Gayatri, who is depressed. To stop this, Ranga plots to kill Gayatri, but she escapes. Everybody is made to believe that Gayatri has eloped with Murali. Anand, the press photographer, falls in love with Sindu. Sindu is born to Krishna, and estate owners, and Sakunthala. She has a brother named Hari. Sakuntala loves money than her husband, and seeds of separation have been sown. Krishna transfers his entire properties to his wife's name and leaves the house. Sindu follows her father. Krishna comes into contact with Savitri. She consoles him and takes care of the child Sindhu, too. Hard work makes Krishna the owner again of a tea estate.

At this juncture, Sindu loves Anand and wants to marry him. Savitri agrees to this, though reluctant at first. Meanwhile, Ranga is continuing his search for Sowmya. Kalyani settles for a girl to be wed to her son Vijay. But he turns it down saying he loves Sowmya. Unable to hide his love, Vijay decides to wed Sowmya, after seeking the blessings of his father. Vijay, who feels Ranga can solve problems, introduces him to Sowmya and there is a huge shock. Sowmya fumes on seeing Ranga who spoiled her family. But there is a catch. To Vijay, Ranga is a godfather, and he would not allow anything said against Ranga. Sowmya senses that Ranga intends to shatter the entire family. Sowmya must save the family and expose him.

== Cast ==
=== Main cast ===
- Venu Arvind as Rangarajan (Ranga / Raja), Savithri's son, Gayathri's husband and baby savithri's father
- Reshma (Epi 1-86) / Sri Durga (Epi 90-403) as Sowmiya Vijay, (Vijay's wife)
- Yuvasri as Gayathri Rangarajan / Jansi (Ranga's wife, Rajashekar's daughter and baby Savithri's mother)
- Jayachitra as Savitri Easwaramoorthy, Rajashekar and Chandrashekar's sister, Ranga's and Bala's mother
- Vadivukkarasi as Kalyani Chandrashekar
- A. L. Raghavan as Chandrasekar, Savithri's and Rajashekar's younger brother
- Kavithalaya Krishnan in a dual role as Ramamoorthy Rajashekar / Rajasekhar, Savithri's younger brother
- Absar as Vijay Chandrashekar, Kalyani's son and Soumiya's husband
- Nithya Ravindran (Epi 1-31) / Vanitha Krishnachandran (Epi 32-403) as Seetha Ramu (Ramu's wife)
- M. N. Nambiar as Father (Acha), caretaker of Ranga, Dharma and others in Nesam ashram
- Nizhalgal Ravi as Easwaramoorthy, Savithri's husband (Ranga's and Bala's father)
- Rajesh as Krishnan (Sakunthala's husband)
- S. N. Lakshmi as Chandrasekhar, Rajasekhar and Savithri's mother
- Murali Kumar as Kannan Chandrashekar, Kalyani's son
- Viji Chandrasekhar as Radha Kannan (Kannan's wife and Kalyani's daughter-in-law)
- Manjari as Sindhu Anand (Savithri's adopted daughter, Krishna's daughter, Anand's wife)
- Shakthhi Kumar as Anand Rajashekar (Rajashekar's son, Sindhu's husband)
- Alaigal Rani as Raji Chandrashekar (Kalyani's daughter)

=== Recurring cast ===
- M. S. Bhaskar as Mouli (Brother of Kalyani)
- Raaghav as Raja, Krishna's adopted son (told to act as Savithri's son)
- K. S. Jayalakshmi as Shakuntala, Krishna's wife
- Mohan Vaidya as Dubbuku Das (Security guard arranged by Ranga to spy on Soumiya)
- Vishwa as Hari (Sindhu's brother)
- Golden Suresh as Bala (Sindhu's adopted brother and Ranga's brother)
- Daniel Balaji as Dharma, Ranga's aide and close friend
- Kavin (Devaguru) as Rahul, Radha's former lover, Raji's husband
- Amitha as Varsha (Ranga's worker who creates differences between Vijay and Soumya)
- Sukumari as Dakshayani Amma
- Srilekha Rajendran as Bama (Soumiya's step-mother)
- Auditor Sridhar as Dhanraj (Anu's father)
- Dinky as Anu (Dhanraj's daughter and bala's fiancee)
- Ganga. K as Murali
- Madurai Jayanthi as Ranga's housemaid
- Muthu Subramaniyam as Sivalingam Soumiya's father
- Sampath as Sampath (Soumiya's first husband who is a fraud)
- Master Naveen as Ramu's son
- Baby Praharshitha as Baby Sindhu
- Master Roshan as young Raja
- Master Prasanna Sundar as young Raja
- Baby Shambhavi
- Aruna as Aruna, Sindhu's hostel mate (uncredited)
- Madurai Nambi
- Railway Vijayakumar
- Sundar K. Vijayan as himself during the promotional launch of Appa after the final episode of Alaigal

== Production ==
=== Development ===
Vikatan Televistas had previously produced weekly series such as Akshaya, Panchavarnakkili, Aanandha Bhavan, Pushpanjali, Sathya and Perai Sollava, decided to produce this series which became their 1st mega series. Vikatan Televistas had signed Sundhar K. Vijayan as the director of this series, who had previously directed few movies such as Revathi, Velicham, En Rathathin Rathame and Ennarukil Nee Irunthal, directed many television series and telefilms. This series marked the 1st collaboration of Sundhar K. Vijayan with Vikatan Televistas. Novelist & screenwriter Devi Bala who had written story, screenplay and dialogues for many series was signed as the story, screenplay and dialogue writer of this series.

Later Devi Bala was replaced with Saiprakash K. Vijayan as the screenplay and dialogue writer of this series.

=== Casting ===
Venu Arvind was signed to play the male lead Rangarajan in this series. This series marked his 1st collaboration with Sundhar K. Vijayan and Vikatan Televistas. Venu Arvind had played an antihero character in this series.

Jayachitra, M. N. Nambiar, Rajesh, Nizhalgal Ravi, S. N. Lakshmi, A. L. Raghavan, Vadivukkarasi, Yuvasri, Reshma, Manjari Vinodhini, Kavithalaya Krishnan, Nithya Ravindar, Srilekha Rajendran, Viji Chandrasekhar, Sukumari, Muralikumar, Shakthhi Kumar, Absar, Daniel Balaji, Raaghav, M. S. Bhaskar, Auditor Sridhar, Vishwa, Golden Suresh, Mohan Vaidya, Devaguru, K. S. Jayalakshmi, Ganga. K, Dinky Rani, Amitha, Mythili, Sampath, Master Roshan, Master Prasanna, Master Naveen and Baby Praharshitha were in supporting and negative characters.

Jayachitra and A. L. Raghavan made their debut in television through this series, especially the latter made his acting debut in this series. This was the last series acted by M. N. Nambiar. T. C. Balaji who made his acting debut in the series Chithi (TV series) was credited as Daniel Balaji for the 1st time in this series as it was the Exercutive President of Vikatan Group who had given him prefix "Daniel" (Name of the character played by Balaji in Chithi) following the recognition and appreciation he had gained among viewers. After the series progressed some actresses such as Reshma and Nithya Ravindar got replaced with Sri Durga and Vanitha Krishnachandran. This was the only series and last project acted by Reshma who left this series as she was going to marry actor Hamsavardhan and quit acting.

== Soundtrack ==
Track listing
| No. | Title | Lyrics | Music | Singer(s) | Length |
|---|---|---|---|---|---|
| 1. | "Suttrum Bhoomi சுற்றும் பூமி" | Vairamuthu | Dhina | Kavita Krishnamurti Subramanian, Palakkad Sreeram | 3:55 |

== Awards and honours ==
| Year | Award | Category | Recipient | Result |
|---|---|---|---|---|
| 2002 | Mylapore Academy Awards | Best Television serial | Alaigal | Won |
| 2002 | Mylapore Academy Awards | Best Director Award | Sundar K. Vijayan | Won |
| 2002 | Mylapore Academy Awards | Best Actor Award | Venu Arvind | Won |

== See also ==
- List of programs broadcast by Sun TV
- List of TV shows aired on Sun TV (India)
