= Ratha Paasam =

Ratha Paasam (transl. Blood Affection) may refer to these Indian films:

- Ratha Paasam (1954 film), a Tamil-language film directed by R. S. Mani
- Ratha Paasam (1980 film), a Tamil-language film directed by K. Vijayan
