= Chanakya (disambiguation) =

Chanakya (c. 370–283 BCE) was an adviser of the first Maurya Emperor Chandragupta.

Chanakya may also refer to:

- Chanakya (1984 film), a 1984 Indian Kannada film
- Chanakya (2005 film), a 2005 Tamil language film
- Chanakya (2019 film), a 2019 Telugu language film
- Chanakya (TV series), an Indian television historical drama
- Chanakya National Law University, a legal education institution in Bihar

== See also ==
- Chanakyan
- Chanakyapuri, an affluent neighborhood in New Delhi
