= Khaidi (1983 film) =

1983 Telugu film by A. Kodandarami Reddy

- Theatrical poster
- Directed by: A. Kodandarami Reddy
- Written by: Screenplay: A. Kodandarami Reddy; Story & Dialogues: Paruchuri brothers
- Produced by: K. Dhanunjaya Reddy; K. Narasa Reddy; S. Sudhakara Reddy
- Starring: Chiranjeevi; Maadhavi
- Cinematography: Lok Singh
- Edited by: Kotagiri Venkateswara Rao
- Music by: K. Chakravarthy
- Production company: Samyuktha Movies
- Release date: 28 October 1983
- Running time: 157 minutes
- Country: India
- Language: Telugu
- Budget: ₹25 lakhs
- Box office: ₹6 crore

Khaidi (transl. Prisoner) is a 1983 Indian Telugu-language action drama film directed by A. Kodandarami Reddy, who co-wrote the script with the Paruchuri brothers. The film stars Chiranjeevi and Madhavi in lead roles. Released on 28 October 1983, Khaidi became a major commercial success and marked a turning point in Chiranjeevi's career, establishing him as a leading star in Telugu cinema.

The film's popularity led to remakes in other languages. In 1984, it was remade in Hindi as Qaidi and in Kannada under the same title, with Madhavi reprising her role in both versions. This movie is inspired by American film First Blood (1982).

== Plot ==
Veerabhadrayya is a feudal lord presiding over a village along with his henchmen, including his assistant and the village sarpanch. Veerabhadrayya lends money to Venkateswarlu, a local farmer living with his widowed daughter. Venkateswarlu's son, Suryam, is a hardworking student living in a nearby city, and he falls in love with Veerabhadrayya's daughter, Madhulatha. When Veerabhadrayya realizes this, he asks Venkateswarlu to persuade his son to stop seeing Madhulatha, but Venkateswarlu refuses.

Veerabhadrayya kills Venkateswarlu and asks Suryam to pay the money which he had given to is deceased father as a loan. Suryam asks for some time and with the help of his elder sister raises crops to repay the loan. Just as the crops are ready for harvest, Veerabhadrayya and his henchmen not only destroy the crops but also try to sexually abuse Suryam's sister, during which she commits suicide.

As the village head, Veerabhadrayya frames Suryam for his sister's death, claiming that he was forcing her into prostitution, resulting in her suicide. Suryam is arrested by the police. The remainder of the movie follows Suryam's escape from jail and his quest for revenge against Veerabhadrayya and his accomplices. With the assistance of Sujatha, a doctor, Suryam seeks to avenge the destruction of his family.

Madhulatha, aware of Suryam's innocence and the injustices he has faced, stands by his side. Her support further fuels Suryam's determination to bring down the corrupt system that has ruined their lives. As Suryam's acts of vengeance intensify, the villagers begin to see him as a hero, rallying behind his cause.

The climax of the film sees a dramatic showdown between Suryam and Veerabhadrayya. In a fierce battle, Suryam confronts Veerabhadrayya, exposing his crimes and bringing him to justice. The film ends with Suryam standing victorious, having avenged his sister's death and cleared his name.

== Cast ==
Sources:

- Chiranjeevi as Suryam
- Madhavi as Madhulatha
- Rao Gopal Rao as Veerabhadrayya
- Sumalatha as Sujatha
- Nutan Prasad as Munsiff
- Rallapalli as Sarma
- Ranganath as Police Inspector Dinesh
- Chalapathi Rao as Forest officer
- P. L. Narayana as Venkateswarlu
- Chidathala Appa Rao as the barber
- Samyuktha as Rosy
- Sangeetha as Suryam's elder sister
- Suthivelu as Beggar
- Sivaprasad as Beggar

== Production ==
=== Development ===
Film presenter M. Tirupathi Reddy and director A. Kodandarami Reddy contemplated doing a film together starring Chiranjeevi. Tirupathi Reddy asked the Paruchuri brothers to develop a story inspired by the American film First Blood (1982), which they did. Kodandarami Reddy later noted that although the lead character's appearance was based on First Blood, the story was entirely different.

Kodandarami Reddy wrote the screenplay, while the Paruchuri brothers wrote the dialogues. In the original script, the protagonist was a villager, but in the final script he was written as a student. The title Khaidi was Tirupathi Reddy's choice. The film was produced by K. Dhanunjaya Reddy, S. Sudhakar Reddy and K. Narasa Reddy under Samyukta Movies, photographed by Lok Singh and edited by Kotagiri Venkateswara Rao.

The remuneration for Chiranjeevi in the film was Rs.1.75 lakhs.

=== Casting ===
The cast included Maadhavi, who was a popular pairing with Chiranjeevi at the time, though she had not previously worked with Kodandarami Reddy. Nithya Ravindran, who had appeared in Tamil films, was cast as Rosy and was renamed Samyuktha after the production banner, Samyuktha Movies.

=== Filming ===
Principal photography for Khaidi began on 30 April 1983, at Prasad Film Labs with a muhurtam shot featuring Chiranjeevi and Madhavi. The majority of the film was shot in the village of Rebala in Nellore district, with climax scenes filmed in Porur near Madras. The shooting spanned three schedules over 40 days, utilizing forty film rolls. A specially constructed set was used for scenes involving explosions. Chiranjeevi’s iconic black trouser and sleeveless T-shirt costume was his own design, which became a significant part of his "Khaidi" image. Chiranjeevi was paid ₹175,000 for the film, while Madhavi and Kodandarami Reddy each received ₹40,000.

== Soundtrack ==
The music was composed by K. Chakravarthy. All lyrics were penned by Veturi. The song "Ragulutondi" was remixed by S. A. Rajkumar in Punnami Naagu (2009), also directed by Kodandarami Reddy.

Track listing
No.	Title	Singer(s)	Length
1.	"Gorinta Poosindi"	S. P. Balasubrahmanyam, P. Susheela	4:25
2.	"Idemitabba"	S. P. Balasubrahmanyam, P.Susheela	4:03
3.	"Mera Mera Merupula"	S. P. Balasubrahmanyam, P.Susheela	4:31
4.	"Ragulutondi"	S. P. Balasubrahmanyam, P. Susheela	4:33
5.	"Tappinchukolevu Na Chethilo"	Anitha Reddy	3:56
Total length:			21:28

== Release and reception ==
Khaidi was released on 28 October 1983. The film was a massive commercial success, grossing around ₹8 crore (equivalent to ₹136 crore or US$14 million in 2023), and Chiranjeevi rose to stardom. The title of the film was considered "lucky" for Chiranjeevi, and used for two subsequent, unrelated films starring him: Khaidi No. 786 (1988) and Khaidi No. 150 (2017), which make up his successful Khaidi trilogy.

== Remakes ==
In 1984, Khaidi was remade in Hindi as Qaidi, and in Kannada under the same title. Maadhavi reprised her role in both remakes.

== Bibliography ==
- Rajadhyaksha, Ashish; Willemen, Paul (1998) [1994]. Encyclopaedia of Indian Cinema. British Film Institute and Oxford University Press. ISBN 0-19-563579-5.
