= K. Vijayan =

Indian film director

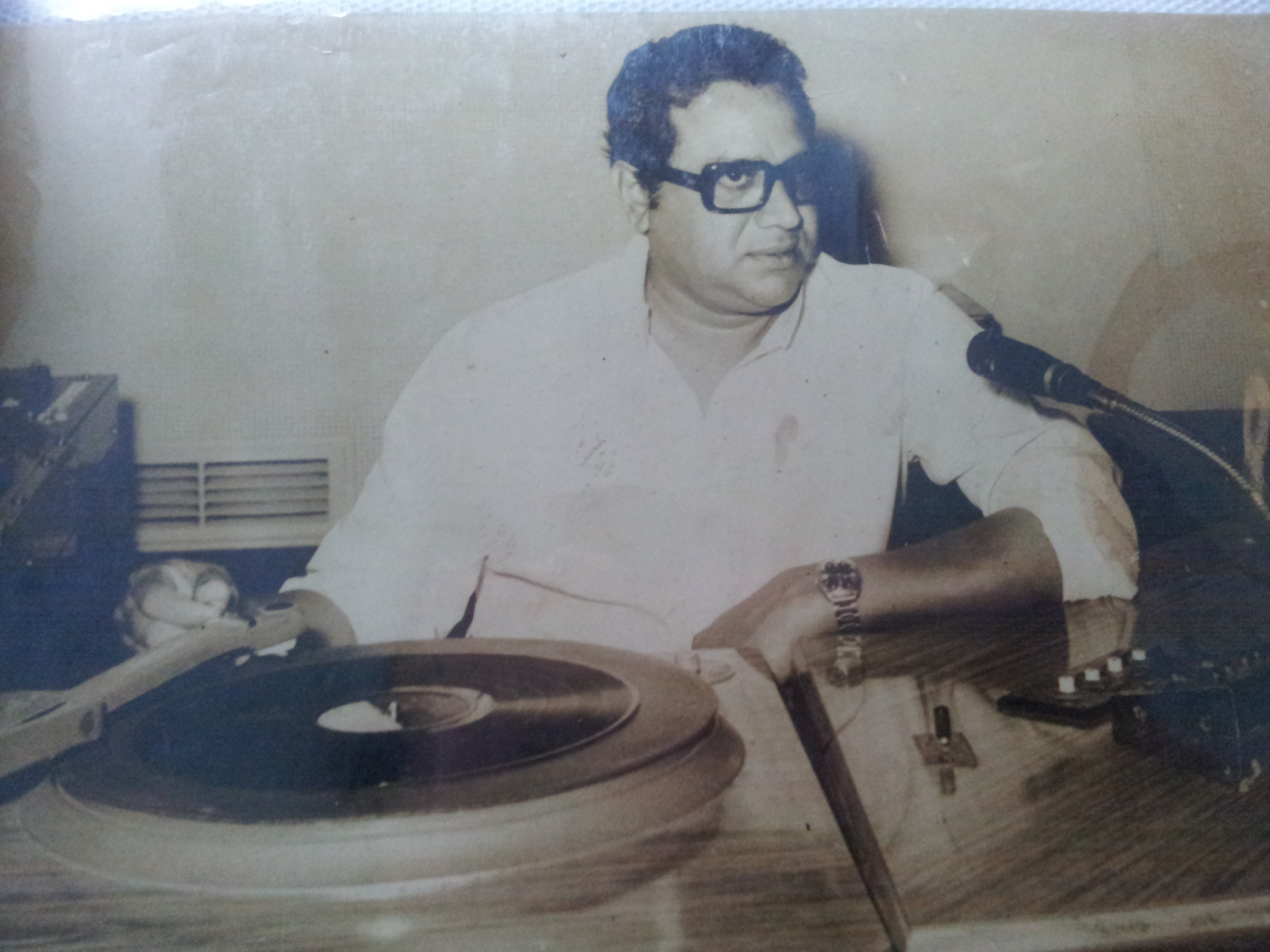
- Born: K. Sathyanathan; 7 December 1939; Tirur, Kerala, British Indian
- Died: 21 July 1988 (aged 48); Chennai
- Occupations: Director producer actor
- Years active: 1969–1988

K. Vijayan (1933–1988) was an Indian film director who predominantly worked in Tamil cinema. He mainly worked with Sivaji Ganesan. He directed many Malayalam films as well.

== Career ==
K. Vijayan was an employee of the Golden Rock Railway Workshop in Tiruchirappalli. His first role as lead actor was portraying Paadhai Theriyudhu Paar in 1960. By the end of that decade he had started directing, mostly associated with Producer K.Balaji of Sujatha Cine Arts. During the 1970s and until the mid-1980s, he directed many Sivaji Ganesan movies, including Kaaval Dheivam, Punniya Boomi and the 1979 blockbuster Thirisoolam. His other notable movies include Vidhi, Sattam, Viduthalai, a remake of Qurbani and Vandichakkaram. He died in 1988 during the filming of En Rathathin Rathame, which was eventually completed by his son Sundar K. Vijayan.

His son was assisted by assistants including Samuthirakani and K. S. Adhiyaman.

== Partial filmography ==
=== As director ===
Year	Film	Language
1969	Kaaval Dheivam	Tamil
1972	Iniyoru Janmam Tharu	Malayalam
1973	Dheiva Vamsam	Tamil
1974	Ore Satchi	Tamil
1975	Puthu Vellam	Tamil
1975	Eduppar Kai Pillai	Tamil
1976	Madhana Maaligai	Tamil
1976	Rojavin Raja	Tamil
1977	Dheepam	Tamil
1977	Annan Oru Koyil	Tamil
1978	Thyagam	Tamil
1978	Rudhra Thaandavam	Tamil
1978	Punniya Boomi	Tamil
1979	Amardeep	Hindi
1979	Thirisoolam	Tamil
1979	Nallathoru Kudumbam	Tamil
1980	Vandichakkaram	Tamil
1980	Ratha Paasam	Tamil
1980	Doorathu Idhi Muzhakkam	Tamil
1980	Rusthum Jodi	Kannada
1980	Yeh Rishta Na Toote	Hindi
1981	Pennin Vazhkai	Tamil
1981	Aani Ver	Tamil
1981	Koyil Puraa	Tamil
1982	Auto Raja	Tamil
1983	Neeru Pootha Neruppu	Tamil
1983	Sattam	Tamil
1983	Anantham Ajnatham	Malayalam
1983	Snehabandanam	Malayalam
1984	Thirakal	Malayalam
1984	Niraparaadhi	Tamil
1984	Karimbu	Malayalam
1984	Jeevitham	Malayalam
1984	Azhagu	Tamil
1984	Vidhi	Tamil
1984	Osai	Tamil
1985	Premapaasam	Tamil
1985	Vasantha Sena	Malayalam
1985	Kaaval	Tamil
1985	Mangamma Sabadham	Tamil
1985	Bandham	Tamil
1986	Viduthalai	Tamil
1986	Anandha Kanneer	Tamil
1987	Vairagyam	Tamil
1987	Velicham	Tamil
1987	Krishnan Vandhaan	Tamil
1987	Thambathyam	Tamil
1989	En Rathathin Rathame	Tamil
1995	Aval Potta Kolam	Tamil
