= Thayamma Kudumbathaar =

Tamil language soap opera

- Genre: Family; Melodrama
- Created by: Radaan Mediaworks
- Written by: Radaan Mediaworks
- Screenplay by: S Kumaresan
- Directed by: E. Vikkiramathithan
- Creative director: Radaan Mediaworks
- Starring: Radhika Sarathkumar; Venu Arvind
- Theme music composer: C. Sathya
- Opening theme: Thayamma by Saindhavi
- Country of origin: India
- Original language: Tamil
- No. of seasons: 2
- No. of episodes: S1 Epi: 413

Production
- Producer: Radaan Mediaworks
- Camera setup: Multi-camera
- Production company: Radaan Mediaworks

Original release
- Network: DD Tamil
- Release: 19 January 2024 – present

Thayamma Kudumbathaar is a 2024 Indian Tamil-language famil Melodrama television series that airs on DD Tamil, produced by Radhika Sarathkumar under the Radaan Mediaworks banner.

The first season had 413 episodes. It premiered on 19 January 2024 and aired from Monday to Friday at 20:30 and ended with 413 episodes on 7 March 2025. The show stars Radhika Sarathkumar and Venu Arvind in lead roles, directed by E.Vikkiramathithan. It premiered, along with two other serials Budget Kudumbam and Shakthi IPS.

The second season premiered on 1 June 2026, and airs on Monday and Friday at 20:30. Radhika Sarathkumar and Venu Arvind once again been appointed in the lead role for the 4th time.

== Series overview ==
Series	Episodes	Originally released	
Series	Episodes	First released	Last released
1	413	19 January 2024	7 March 2025
2	TBA	1 June 2026	TBA

== Plot ==
The story follows Thayamma (Radhika Sarathkumar), who is the perfect wife and mother, who supports her husband Velmurugan and their children Bharath, Shyamala, and their adopted children Ram and Gowri. Explores central themes of family bonds and matriarchal strength.

== Cast ==
=== Main ===
- Radhika Sarathkumar as Thayamma (2024-2025/2026-present)
  - Preetha Suresh as Young Thayamma
- Venu Arvind as Velmurugan (2024-2025/2026-present)
  - Ajay as Young Velmurugan

=== Recurring ===
- Arjun (2024-2025) / Naresh Eswar (2026-present) as Ram
- Praharshitha (2024-2025) as Gowri
- Rani as Prabhavathy Elangovanan (2024-2025/2026-present)
  - VJ Keerthi as Young Prabhavathy Elangovanan
- Mahalashmi Shankar as Shyamala Nandan
- Vittal (2024-2025) as Bharath
- Poovilangu Mohan as Sattanathan (2024-2025/2026-present)
- Senthilnathan as Ezhumalai
- Vinoth KG as Saravanan
- Rekha Angelina as Baakiyam
  - Dhanalakshmi Shiva as Young Baakiyam
- Harshini (2024-2025) / Rubiseena (2026-present) as Sandhiya
- Banu Mathy / Sheela as Lakshmi
- Manas Chavali as Elangovanan (Died in serial)
- VJ Lavanya as Keerthi
- Sudharsanam / Arun Kumar Rajan as Nandan
- Meenakshi Muruha as Sundariammal

== Production ==
=== Development ===
Originally produced and under the working title Thayamma, Thayamma Kudumbathaar was produced by actress Radhika Sarathkumar's Radhika Mediaworks and directed by Vikram Adhityan and E. Vikkiramathithan. Originally developed for broadcast on Kalaignar TV , the series was later aired on DD Tamil. Music composed by C. Sathya and performed by Saindhavi.

=== Casting ===
Production began with the casting of Radhika Sarathkumar and Venu Arvind being paired for the fourth time. Venu Arvind's previous role has been in 2018-2019 serial Chandrakumari, and Praharshitha had been on hiatus for eighteen years.
