= Agni Samskaram =

- Theatrical release poster
- Directed by: G.V. Prabhakar.
- Starring: Chiranjeevi; Maadhavi; Kavitha; Subhashini
- Music by: M. Janardhan
- Release date: February 21, 1980
- Country: India
- Language: Telugu

Agni Samskaram is a 1980 Indian Telugu-language film starring Chiranjeevi, Maadhavi, Kavitha and Subhashini. The film was a box office failure.

== Cast ==
- Chiranjeevi
- Maadhavi
- Kavitha
- Subhashini

== Soundtrack ==
1. "Kondamedha Kapuramundu" – Lyrics by Sri Sri; vocals by Srinivas and Ramola
2. "Manchuna Tadisina Mallikavo" – Lyrics by Veturi; vocals by S. P. Balasubrahmanyam and P. Susheela
3. "Manishai Mathanulu" – Lyrics by M. Gopi; vocals by Ramakrishna
4. "Sivasankara Kailasavasa" – Lyrics by Sri Sri; vocals by S. Janaki
