= Aval Potta Kolam =

- Directed by: K. Vijayan
- Produced by: Nagoor S.M.S.Alauddin Marakkayar; Devanathan
- Starring: Rajesh; Ambika
- Cinematography: Tiwari
- Edited by: Babu
- Music by: Chandrabose
- Production company: J. N. Combines
- Release date: 8 August 1995
- Country: India
- Language: Tamil

Aval Potta Kolam (transl. The kolam designed by her) is a 1995 Indian Tamil-language film directed by K. Vijayan under J. N. Combines. The film stars Rajesh and Ambika. It was released on 8 August 1995.

== Cast ==
- Rajesh
- Ambika
- Baby Shalini
- Nizhalgal Ravi
- Vennira Aadai Moorthy

== Soundtrack ==
The soundtrack was composed by Chandrabose.

Track listing
No.	Title	Singer(s)	Length
1.	"Poda Nee"	Malaysia Vasudevan
2.	"Kavalaigalai"	S. Janaki
3.	"Enna Solla"	Vani Jairam, Malaysia Vasudevan
4.	"Penn Sonal"	K. S. Chithra, Vani Jairam

== Release and reception ==
Even though the LP Records were released in 1986, the film was released only on 8 August 1995. Balumani of Anna on 28 September 1987 praised the acting, music, cinematography and the message.
