= Gandugali Rama =

- Directed by: H. R. Bhargava
- Written by: N. S. Rao
- Story by: Mamatha Movies
- Produced by: Smt Lakshmi Venkatesh
- Starring: Vishnuvardhan; Madhavi; Jayamalini; M. P. Shankar
- Cinematography: H. G. Raju
- Edited by: Yadav Victor
- Music by: Satyam
- Production company: Guru Mamatha Chithra
- Distributed by: Guru Mamatha Chithra
- Release date: 13 September 1983
- Running time: 137 min
- Country: India
- Language: Kannada

Gandugali Rama is a 1983 Indian Kannada-language film, directed by H. R. Bhargava and produced by Smt Lakshmi Venkatesh. The film stars Vishnuvardhan, Madhavi, Jayamalini and M. P. Shankar.

== Cast ==
- Vishnuvardhan
- Madhavi
- Jayamalini
- M. P. Shankar
- T. M. Venkatesh
- Sundar Krishna Urs
- Sudheer
- N. S. Rao
- Thyagaraja Urs
- Rajanand
- Ramadas
- Rajanagesh
- Gode Lakshminarayan
- Jr. Narasimharaju
- Thimma
- Negro Johnny
- Master Naveen
- Kaminidharan
- Ashalatha
- Mallika
- Prabha
- Vimala
- Kamala
- Shwetha
- Sarala
- Ramani
- Bharathi
- Anuradha

== Soundtrack ==
The music was composed by Satyam.

No.	Song	Singers	Lyrics	Length (m:ss)
1	"Nannane Deva"	S. P. Balasubrahmanyam	Geethapriya	04:22
2	"Vaiyyari Nee Heege"	Vishnuvardhan, Vani Jairam	Chi. Udaya Shankar	04:35
3	"Ammamma Ninnannu"	S. P. Balasubrahmanyam, Vani Jairam	Chi. Udaya Shankar	04:37
4	"Appa Ramanna"	S. Janaki, S. P. Balasubrahmanyam	Chi. Udaya Shankar	04:29
5	"Naane Naane"	S. P. Balasubrahmanyam	Shyamasundara Kulkarni	04:17
