= Maadhavi (actress) =

Indian actress (born 1972)

- Occupation: Actress
- Years active: 1976–1997

Kanaka Vijayalakshmi, known by her stage name Maadhavi, is a popular Indian film actress who has acted in several Telugu, Hindi, Tamil, Kannada and Malayalam films. In a career spanning 20 years, she has acted in more than 300 films. She was one of the most leading and most successful actresses of South Indian Cinema throughout the 1980s and in early 1990s. She was popular in Malayalam, Telugu, Tamil, Kannada and Hindi films. She has won State Film Awards and Filmfare Awards. After establishing herself as a known actress of the South Indian Film Industry of the 1980s and early 90s, she left the industry in 1997.

== Early life ==
Maadhavi was born in 1962 in Velupucherla village in Eluru district, Andhra Pradesh, India to Sasirekha and Govindaswamy. She grew up with a sister and a brother, named Keerthi Kumari and Dhananjay respectively.

She learned Bharatanatyam from Uma Maheswari and folk dance from Bhatt from an early age and gave more than a thousand dance performances. She attended Stanley Girls High School in Hyderabad, Abids Branch.

== Career ==
Director Dasari Narayana Rao gave her a starring role in the Telugu film Thoorupu Padamara when she was a teenager. The film became a huge hit. K. Balachander then cast her in a supporting role in his Telugu film Maro Charitra (1978). She reprised her role in its Hindi remake Ek Duuje Ke Liye (1981), which became the top-grossing film of 1981. In both films, she played a lonely wealthy woman who falls in love with Kamal Haasan's character. She earned a Filmfare Award nomination as Best Supporting Actress. K. Balachander introduced her to the Tamil film industry with Thillu Mullu (1981), opposite Rajinikanth. By the end of the decade, she starred opposite Amitabh Bachchan in the Hindi film Andha Kanoon 1983, Geraftaar 1985, Agneepath (1990).

She has acted in many Kannada movies with stalwarts like Dr. Rajkumar, Vishnuvardhan, Anant Nag and Ambareesh. She starred in seven movies with Rajkumar - Haalu Jenu, Bhagyada Lakshmi Baramma, Anuraga Aralithu, Shruthi Seridaaga, Jeevana Chaitra, Aakasmika and Odahuttidavaru. With Vishnuvardhan too she has acted in seven movies - Onde Guri, Gandugali Rama, Chinnadantha Maga, Rudranaga, Khaidi, Chanakya and Malaya Marutha.

Madhavi acted alongside Kamal Haasan in Raja Paarvai, Tik Tik Tik, Kaakki Sattai, Sattam, Ellam Inba Mayam and Mangamma Sabadham. Her films with Rajinikanth include Garjanai, Thillu Mullu, Thambikku Entha Ooru, Un Kannil Neer Vazhindal and Viduthalai. She was in Enga Oor Kannagi, Neethi Devan Mayakkam and Nirabaraadhi.

She acted in a number of films with Telugu actor Chiranjeevi. Her first movie with Chiranjeevi was Intlo Ramayya Veedhilo Krishnayya in 1982. She acted again with Chiranjeevi in the movie Khaidi which was a massive hit. Her last movie in Telugu was Big Boss (another Chiranjeevi film).

She appeared in many Malayalam films especially those starring Mohanlal and Mammootty. She portrayed Unniyarcha in the National Award-winning movie Oru Vadakkan Veeragadha (1989). Her portrayal as a mother who dies of leukemia in Akashadoothu won her the Kerala State Film Award for Second Best Actress and Filmfare Award for Best Actress for 1993. Other films include Ormakkayi, Changatham, Novemberinte Nashtam and Nombarathi Poovu

Most of her author-backed roles were in Malayalam films. She has won three Kerala State Film Awards, one for Best Actress and two for Second Best Actress.

== Personal life ==
In 1996, her Hindu spiritual teacher Swami Rama arranged her marriage to one of his followers, a pharmaceutical businessman named Ralph Sharma. Ralph first met Swami Rama at the age of 32 at the Himalayan Institute of Yoga Science and Philosophy., and Maadhavi first met him in 1995. They married on 14 February 1996. They have three daughters and live in New Jersey.

== Awards and honours ==
Year	Award	Award category	Work	Result	Reference
1981	Kerala State Film Awards	Second Best Actress	Valarthu Mrugangal	Won	
1982	Kerala State Film Awards	Best Actress	Ormakkayi	Won	
1993	Kerala State Film Awards	Second Best Actress	Aakashadoothu	Won	
1993	Filmfare Awards South	Best Actress – Malayalam	Aakashadoothu	Won	

== Filmography ==
=== Telugu ===
Year	Film	Role	Notes
1976	Thoorpu Padamara	Kalyani	
1977	Amara Deepam	Madhavi	
1977	Sneham	—	
1978	Maro Charitra	Sandhya	
1978	Pranam Khareedu	Venkatalakshmi	Guest Appearance
1978	Seetapathi Samsaram	Meenakshi	
1978	Manavoori Pandavulu		
1978	Kalanthakulu	Saroja	
1979	Iddaru Asadhyule	—	
1979	Tayaramma Bangarayya	Aruna	
1979	Kukka Katuku Cheppu Debba	Parvati	
1979	Kothala Raayudu	Padma	
1979	Mande Gundelu	Rani	
1979	Ra Ra Krishnayya	—	
1979	Edi Papam Edi Punyam	Aruna	
1979	Oka Challani Ratri	Nirmala	
1979	Anthuleni Vintha Katha	Meena	
1979	Kaliyuga Mahabharatam	—	
1980	Agni Sanskaram	—	
1980	Mudumulla Bandham	Radha	
1980	Triloka Sundari	—	
1981	Vaaralabbai	Kamala	
1981	Chettaniki Kallu Levu	Rekha	
1981	Ooriki Ichina Maata	Rupa	
1981	Amavasya Chandrudu	Nancy	
1981	Tholi Kodi Koosindi	Jabili	
1982	Intlo Ramayya Veedilo Krishnayya	Jayalaxmi	Nominated — Filmfare Award for Best Actress – Telugu
1982	Balidanam	—	
1982	Prayanamlo Padanisalu	—	
1982	Edi Dharmam Edi Nyayam?	Bharathi	
1983	Chattaniki Veyyi Kallu	Jyothi, 'Heccharika' paper reporter	
1983	Roshagadu	Sailaja	
1983	Simhapuri Simham	Madhavi	
1983	Khaidi	Madhulatha	
1983	Picchi Pantulu	—	
1984	Bhale Ramudu	Radha	
1985	Sanchalanam	—	
1985	Nerasthudu	Radha	
1985	Chattamtho Poratam	Bharathi	
1985	Jai Bethala	—	
1985	Mahasakthi	—	
1986	Ide Naa Samadhanam	Neelima	
1987	Veera Pratap	Padmavathi	
1987	Donga Mogudu	Ravi Teja's wife	
1987	Marana Sasanam	—	
1987	Parasakthi	Madhavi	
1990	Siri Muvvala Simhanadam		
1993	Mathru Devo Bhava	Sarada	Nominated — Filmfare Award for Best Actress – Telugu
1995	Big Boss	—	

=== Malayalam ===
Year	Film	Role	Notes
1980	Lava	Seetha	
1981	Valarthu Mrugangal	Janu	Won — Kerala State Film Award for Second Best Actress
1981	Garjanam	Geetha	
1981	Poochasanyasi	Sandhya	
1982	Anuraagakkodathi	Anuradha	
1982	Ormakkayi	Susanna	Won — Kerala State Film Award for Best Actress
1982	Kurukkante Kalyanam	Saritha	
1982	John Jaffer Janardhanan	Nancy	
1982	Novemberinte Nashtam	Meera	
1982	Sindoora Sandhyakku Mounam	Siji	
1983	Ponthooval		
1983	Prem Nazirine Kanmanilla	Herself	
1983	Hello Madras Girl	Saritha	
1983	Changatham	Annie	
1984	Akkare	Padmavathi	
1984	Vikatakavi	Santhi	
1984	Mangalam Nerunnu	Rajani	
1984	Kurishuyudham	Susy, Daisy	Double role
1985	Oru Kudakeezhil	Vijayalakshmi	
1985	Adhyayam Onnu Muthal	Seetha	
1986	Sobharaj	Nisha	
1986	Oru Katha Oru Nunakkatha	Amminikkutty	
1987	Nombarathi Poovu	Padmini	
1989	Oru Vadakkan Veeragatha	Unniyarcha	
1993	Akashadoothu	Annie	Won — Kerala State Film Award for Second Best Actress; Won — Filmfare Award for Best Actress — Malayalam
1993	Gandhari	Gandhari	
1994	Sudhinam	Vinodini	
1995	Chaithanyam	Savithri	
1995	Aksharam	Gayathri Devi	
1996	Aayiram Naavulla Ananthan	Sridevi	

=== Hindi ===
Year	Film	Role	Notes
1981	Ek Duuje Ke Liye	Sandhya	Nominated — Filmfare Award for Best Supporting Actress
1983	Andha Kanoon	Zakhiya Khan	Special appearance
1984	Mujhe Shaktee Do		
1984	Qaidi	Preethi	
1985	Misaal		
1985	Geraftaar	Inspector Geeta Sinha	
1987	Loha	Anita	
1987	Kalyug Aur Ramayan	Sarita	
1987	Satyamev Jayathe	Pooja Shastry	
1987	Insaaf Kaun Karega	Priya	
1988	Pyar Ka Mandir	Radha	
1988	Mar Mitenge	Radha	
1988	Falak	Rita D'Souza	
1989	Paraya Ghar	Meena	
1989	Jaaydaad	Advocate Anjali	
1989	Lashkar	Anand's wife	
1989	Zakham	Asha	
1989	Nafrat Ki Aandhi	Geeta	
1990	Sheshnaag	Banu	
1990	Muqadammah		
1990	Haar Jeet		
1990	Swarg	Janaki Kumar	
1990	Agneepath	Mary Mathew	
1990	Agneekaal	Asha	
1991	Maza Pritesh		
1992	Sarphira	Prema	
1992	Lambu Dada	Anita	
1992	Jigar		
1994	Khudai	Sakhi Swami	

=== Tamil ===
Year	Film	Role	Notes
1979	Pudhiya Thoranangal	Kanniamma	
1980	Veera Penn	—	
1981	Enga Ooru Kannagi	Jabili	
1981	Amara Kaaviyam	Aruna	
1981	Thillu Mullu	Sarojini	
1981	Garjanai	Geetha	
1981	Sathya Sundharam	Lakshmi	
1981	Raja Paarvai	Nancy	
1981	Tik Tik Tik	Sharadha	
1981	Ellam Inba Mayyam	Madhavi	
1981	Panimalar	—	
1982	Neethi Devan Mayakkam	Bharathi	
1982	Kavithai Malar	—	
1983	Sattam	Radha	
1983	Sattathukku Oru Saval	Manjula	
1983	Chandi Samundi	—	
1984	Thambikku Entha Ooru	Sumathi	
1984	Niraparaadhi	Radha	
1985	Kaakki Sattai	Anitha	
1985	Jhansi	—	
1985	Mangamma Sabadham	Nancy	
1985	Andavan Sothu	—	
1985	Un Kannil Neer Vazhindal	Padma	
1986	Viduthalai	Radha	
1986	Vettaipuli	—	
1987	Oor Kuruvi	—	
1990	Athisaya Piravi	Rambha	Guest appearance

=== Kannada ===
Year	Film	Role	Notes
1981	Garjane	Geetha	
1981	Anupama	Anupama	
1982	Haalu Jenu	Kamala	
1982	Garuda Rekhe	—	
1983	Onde Guri	—	
1983	Gandugali Rama	—	
1983	Chinnadantha Maga	Usha	
1983	Gedda Maga	—	
1984	Chanakya	—	
1984	Rudranaga	Lakshmi	
1984	Shiva Kanye	—	
1984	Khaidi	Madhulatha	
1985	Amara Jyothi	—	
1986	Bhagyada Lakshmi Baramma	Parvati	
1986	Anuraga Aralithu	Ashadevi	
1986	Malaya Marutha	Girija	
1986	Mathondu Charithre		
1987	Shruthi Seridaaga	Radha	
1988	Ramanna Shamanna	Kavitha	
1992	Jeevana Chaitra	Meenakshi	
1993	Aakasmika	Clara	
1994	Odahuttidavaru	Ganga	
1997	Shrimathi		
