= Revathi (1986 film) =

- Directed by: Sundar K. Vijayan
- Written by: Aaroor Dass (dialogues)
- Produced by: Meera Balagopalan
- Starring: Suresh; Revathi
- Cinematography: G. Or. Nathan
- Edited by: D. Vasu
- Music by: Shankar–Ganesh
- Production company: J. V. Movies
- Release date: 30 May 1986
- Country: India
- Language: Tamil

Revathi (/reɪvəθi/) is a 1986 Indian Tamil-language film and Sundar K. Vijayan's directorial debut. The film stars Suresh and Revathi, with Anand Babu, Jaishankar, Sarath Babu, Thengai Srinivasan, Sujatha and Varalakshmi in supporting roles. It was released on 30 May 1986.

== Cast ==
- Suresh
- Revathi
- Anand Babu
- Jaishankar
- Sarath Babu
- Thengai Srinivasan
- Sujatha
- Varalakshmi

== Production ==
Revathi is the directorial debut of K. Vijayan's son Sundar, who was 18 years old at the time of its making. Cinematography was handled by G. Or. Nathan, and editing by D. Vasu.

== Soundtrack ==
The music was composed by Shankar–Ganesh.

Track listing
No.	Title	Lyrics	Singer(s)	Length
1.	"Aththanin Nenchukkulle Tik Tik"	Vairamuthu	K. J. Yesudas, S. Janaki	4:27
2.	"Kathalika Kathukka"	Vaali	S. P. Balasubrahmanyam, Vani Jairam	4:14
3.	"Kalyana Panthalilea"	Pulamaipithan	Vani Jairam	4:48
4.	"Ooththunga Suthi Yeththunga"	Vairamuthu	Vani Jairam	4:16
Total length:				17:45

== Release and reception ==
Revathi was released on 30 May 1986. Kalki appreciated Revathi's performance and two of the songs and called Sundar's direction as non fussy but panned certain scenes.
