= Big Boss (film) =

1995 Indian Telugu-language film

- Poster
- Directed by: Vijaya Bapineedu
- Produced by: Maganti Ravindranath Chowdary
- Starring: Chiranjeevi; Roja; Kota Srinivasa Rao; Vijayachander; Madhavi
- Cinematography: Lok Singh; Prasad Babu
- Edited by: Trinath
- Music by: Bappi Lahiri
- Production company: Shyam Prasad Arts
- Distributed by: Geetha Arts
- Release date: 15 June 1995
- Country: India
- Language: Telugu

Big Boss is a 1995 Indian Telugu-language film directed by Vijaya Bapineedu. The film stars Chiranjeevi, Roja, Kota Srinivasa Rao and Madhavi in important roles. The film was also dubbed and released in Malayalam under the same title. It was a failure at the box office.

== Plot ==
The movie starts with a young man Surendra (Chiranjeevi) landing in a town for a job. He witnesses rivalry between two mafia gangs at that place. After a fight with a street goon, he is recognized by one gang and encouraged to become a don. He rents a room in Madhavi's house, who lives with her sister Roja and granny (Nirmalamma). After few routine scenes, Roja falls in love with Surendra and expresses her love. But Bavaraju Surendra becomes uncertain about his future, rejects Roja's proposal and starts looking for matches for her. Meanwhile, his mother (Sujatha), younger brother, and sister move to his place and start living with him. His mother worries about his lifestyle and his future. One day, she recognizes Kota Srinivasa Rao, the rival gang leader as the destroyer of her family. Surendra's family is kidnapped by Kota and how Surendra rescues them forms the climax of this movie.

== Cast ==
- Chiranjeevi as Bavarala Surendra / Boss
- Roja as Roja (Voice Dubbed by Roja Ramani)
- Kota Srinivasa Rao as Varadarajulu
- Vijayachander as Akkineedu
- Madhavi
- Ali
- Nirmalamma as Roja's grandmother
- Anjali Devi
- Jyothi Lakshmi
- Allu Rama Lingaiah as Kukkalakunta Subbarao
- Babu Mohan
- Narra Venkateswara Rao
- P. J. Sharma
- Vinod
- Mithai Chitti
- Sujatha as Surendra's mother
- Tanikella Bharani as SI Yadagiri
- J. V. Somayajulu
- Nutan Prasad
- Easwar Rao
- Rajeev Kanakala

== Soundtrack ==
Music by Bappi Lahiri.

1. "Mava Mava": S. P. Balasubrahmanyam, K. S. Chitra
2. "Koosethesinnade": S. P. Balasubrahmanyam, Renuka
3. "Uromochesindoy": S. P. Balasubrahmanyam, K. S. Chitra
4. "Nee Lanti Revulona": S. P. Balasubrahmanyam, K. S. Chitra
5. "Number 1 Number 2": S. P. Balasubrahmanyam
6. "Sudiki Daram": Mano, K. S. Chitra

== Reception ==
Big Boss, the sixth collaboration of the director Vijaya Bapineedu with Chiranjeevi, was a box-office failure.
