= Karumbu Vil =

- Poster
- Directed by: Vijay
- Screenplay by: R. Selvaraj
- Produced by: G. R. Purushothaman
- Starring: Sudhakar; Subhashini; Y. Vijaya
- Cinematography: Gnanam; P. L. Roy
- Edited by: Vijay
- Music by: Ilaiyaraaja
- Production company: G. R. P. Enterprises
- Release date: 29 February 1980
- Country: India
- Language: Tamil

Karumbu Vil (transl. Sugarcane bow) is a 1980 Indian Tamil-language film directed by Vijay and written by R. Selvaraj. The film stars Sudhakar, Subhashini and Y. Vijaya. It was released on 29 February 1980.

== Cast ==
- Sudhakar
- Subhashini
- Y. Vijaya
- Sathyaraj
- Suruli Rajan

== Soundtrack ==
The music was composed by Ilaiyaraaja. The song "Meenkodi Theril" is set to Mohanam, a Carnatic raga, and attained popularity.

Track listing
No.	Title	Lyrics	Singer(s)	Length
1.	"Meenkodi Theril" (male)	M. G. Vallabhan	K. J. Yesudas	4:31
2.	"Malarkale"	Gangai Amaran	S. Janaki, Malaysia Vasudevan	4:40
3.	"Adi Naagu"	Muthulingam	P. Jayachandran, Maharajan, Krishnamoorthi	4:36
4.	"Meenkodi Theril" (female)	M. G. Vallabhan	Jensy	4:28
Total length:				18:15

== Release and reception ==
Karumbu Vil was released on 29 February 1980. Kanthan of Kalki appreciated P. L. Roy's cinematography, especially his capturing of forests, mountains, waterfalls and rivers along with Subhashini's performance but felt the story lacked substance.
