= Niraparaadhi =

- DVD cover
- Directed by: K. Vijayan
- Screenplay by: Aaroor Dass (dialogues)
- Story by: Sridhar Prasad
- Produced by: K. Balaji
- Starring: Mohan; Madhavi
- Cinematography: Tiwari
- Edited by: V. Chakrapani
- Music by: Shankar–Ganesh
- Production company: Sujatha Cine Arts
- Release date: 15 August 1984
- Country: India
- Language: Tamil

Niraparaadhi (transl. Innocent) is a 1984 Indian Tamil-language crime film, directed by K. Vijayan and produced by K. Balaji. The film stars Mohan and Madhavi in the lead roles. It is a remake of the Hindi film Be Abroo, and was released on 15 August 1984.

== Plot ==
Aruna elopes with Jayaprakash. They come to Jayaprakash's house where his father, Durai Raj accepts them wholeheartedly. Later, Durai Raj attempts to rape Aruna and reveals to her that Jayaprakash is not his son but a pimp who sold her to him. She tries to escape but is unsuccessful. Jayaprakash also tells her that he married many other girls and sold them. Feeling devastated, Aruna kills herself.

Radha reaches Chennai to begin her job as a chief reporter. She tries to contact her friend Ratna, who is supposed to pick her up at the bus station. She meets a man there who offers her tea. After drinking it, she falls unconscious. The man is a pimp and sells her to four men on the same night. When the pimp physically tortures her she kills him with a razor.

Inspector Raja is assigned to investigate the murder of the pimp. He and Radha are college classmates who were in love but separated now. Raja wants to rekindle his relationship with Radha, but she denies it due to the rape that happened to her.

Vicky runs a brothel in the name of a massage parlor and takes Meena to mafia leader Jana, who is waiting for her at a hotel. Radha is at the same hotel for an interview and sees Vicky and Meena there. She gets suspicious and follows them. Raja with his subordinate Balan, reaches the same hotel to arrest Jana. The hotel receptionist informs Jana about the police and he attempts to flee. Radha kills him with the same razor in the elevator. While leaving the hotel, Balan notices her.

Raja arrests Vicky with Meena's help but Vicky denies killing Jana. Radha interviews cabaret dancer Shailaja and meets Durairaj there and has a verbal spat with him. Durairaj follows Radha on the road, and she kills him with the razor she used in a previous murder. Since Vicky was in jail during Durairaj‘s murder with the same weapon, police realize he didn't kill Jana and release him. Vicky is later found murdered in a car.

Raja wants to marry Radha and gets his mother's permission. On the day of marriage, Shailaja comes to congratulate Radha and finds a photo of Radha with Aruna. It is revealed that Radha and Aruna were sisters. Shailaja, who was present during Aruna's suicide, reveals all details to Radha. Radha leaves the wedding ceremony and tracks down Jayaprakash and kills him. The hotel staff notice her and inform the police. Raja arrives and confronts Radha about the murders. She informs the reason behind the murders. Raja assures her that he will stand by her in any situation and will marry her. But Radha refuses to surrender and tells that instead of standing as a criminal before the law, she wants to die as a niraparaadhi (innocent). She cuts her neck with the same murder weapon and dies in Raja’s arms.

== Cast ==
- Mohan as Inspector Raja (guest appearance)
- Madhavi as Radha
- V. K. Ramasamy (guest appearance)
- R. S. Manohar as Durai Raj
- K. Vijayan
- Nizhalgal Ravi as Jayaprakash
- Sangili Murugan as Vicky
- Ennathe Kannaiah as constable
- Manorama as constable
- Sathyakala
- Rani Padmini as Aruna
- Nalinikanth
- Suresh Gopi as Inspector Balan
- Silk Smitha as Shailaja
- Anuradha

== Production ==
After watching the Hindi film Be Abroo, K. Balaji bought the rights to remake it in Tamil as Niraparaadhi, outbidding many other producers. It is the Tamil debut of Malayalam actor Suresh Gopi. Filming was completed in two months.

== Soundtrack ==
The soundtrack was composed by Shankar–Ganesh.

Track listing
No.	Title	Lyrics	Singer(s)	Length
1.	"Mangani Semmangani"	Vaali	Vani Jairam
2.	"Devi Neeyindri"	Pulamaipithan	S. P. Balasubrahmanyam, Vani Jairam
3.	"Pollachi Machane"	Vaali	Vani Jairam, B. S. Siserekha
4.	"Pennukku Daivam"	Pulamaipithan	K. J. Yesudas, Chorus

== Release and reception ==
The film faced censorship issues with the Central Board of Film Certification prior to its release. It was eventually cleared with an A (adults only) certificate after around 40 cuts. The film, which was scheduled to release on 27 July 1984, was delayed to 15 August. Jayamanmadhan of Kalki said that, after watching the film, one might start seeing all men in Chennai as pimps.
