= Ezham Rathri =

1982 film by Krishna Kumar

- Directed by: Krishnakumar
- Written by: Krishnakumar
- Produced by: Krishnakumar
- Starring: Kamal Haasan; Jyothi Lakshmi; Karan; Nagesh
- Music by: Ilaiyaraaja
- Production company: Almighty Films
- Release date: 20 August 1982
- Country: India
- Language: Malayalam

Ezham Rathri (transl. The Seventh Night) is a 1982 Indian Malayalam-language thriller film, directed by Krishnakumar. The film stars Kamal Haasan in lead role with Jyothi Lakshmi, Nagesh and Karan in supporting roles. The film has musical score by Ilaiyaraaja. It was dubbed into Tamil language as Ezhavathu Iravil.

== Cast ==
- Kamal Haasan
- Nagesh
- Karan
- Jyothi Lakshmi
- Subhashini
- Rajeshwari
