= Subhashini =

Indian actress

- Occupation: Actress
- Years active: 1978–2013
- Relatives: See Nidudavolu Family

Subhashini is an Indian actress who works predominantly in Telugu films and television.

== Career ==
Her notable films include Sivaranjani (1978), Johnny (1980), Doctor Cine Actor (1982), Meghasandesam (1982), and Arundhati (2009). She also acted in serials like Nagaastram (ETV), Sundarakanda (Gemini TV) and Chellamay (Sun TV).

Subhashini's daughter Pooja also acted in a film but she gave it up.

== Partial filmography ==
=== Telugu films ===
Year	Title	Role	Notes
1978	Sivaranjani		Debut Film
1979	Urvasi Neeve Naa Preyasi	Vasanthi	
1979	Maa Voollo Mahasivudu	Kamala	
1979	Tiger	Shanti	
1979	Nindu Noorellu		
1980	Mahalakshmi	Jaya	
1980	Agni Samskaram		
1980	Aarani Mantalu	Saradha	
1981	Patalam Pandu	Vaali	
1981	Agni Poolu	Neeli	
1981	Guru Sishyulu		Item number
1981	Prema Kanuka	Rani	
1981	Viswaroopam	Revathi	
1981	Kondaveeti Simham	Pushpa	
1982	Meghasandesam		
1982	Gopala Krishnudu		
1982	Bobbili Puli		Item number
1982	Justice Chowdary	Tata Rao's daughter	
1982	Bangaru Bhoomi		
1982	Doctor Cine Actor	Ranjana	
2003	Ammayilu Abbayilu	Manju's mother	
2003	Seetayya		
2004	Cheppave Chirugali	Nirmala's mother	
2007	Anasuya		
2007	Lakshmi Kalyanam		
2009	Arundhati	Jalajamma	

=== Other language films ===
Year	Title	Role	Language	Notes
1979	Azhage Unnai Aarathikkiren	Vasanthi	Tamil	
1979	Urvashi Neene Nanna Preyasi	Vasanthi	Kannada	
1980	Johnny	Tribal woman	Tamil	Guest appearance
1980	Geetha Oru Shenbagapoo		Tamil	
1980	Natchathiram		Tamil	
1980	Karumbu Vil		Tamil	
1981	Nee Nanna Gellalare	Roopa	Kannada	Guest Appearance
1981	Kallan Pavithran	Bhama	Malayalam	
1981	Grihalakshmi		Malayalam	
1982	Ezham Rathri		Malayalam	
1982	Aranjaanam	Priya	Malayalam	
1982	Ajith		Kannada	
1982	Khadeema Kallaru		Kannada	
1983	Asthi	Elizabeth	Malayalam	
1984	Then Situkkal		Tamil	
1984	Fifty Fifty		Kannada	
1994	Minnaram	Daisy	Malayalam	
1998	Kondattam	Anand's aunt	Tamil	
2002	Varushamellam Vasantham	Raja's mother	Tamil	
2002	Ivan	Meena Kumari's mother	Tamil	
2003	Boys	Bob Gally's mother	Tamil	
2003	Thathi Thavadhu Manasu		Tamil	

== TV serials ==
Telugu

- Srimathi
- Nagaastram
- Nagamma as Rayudu's daughter
- Sundarakanda as Bhanumathi Devi

Tamil

- Sakthi
- Chinna Chinna Aasai- Ganga
- Chellamay as Thaazhaiyamma
