= Kavitha (actress) =

Indian actress and politician

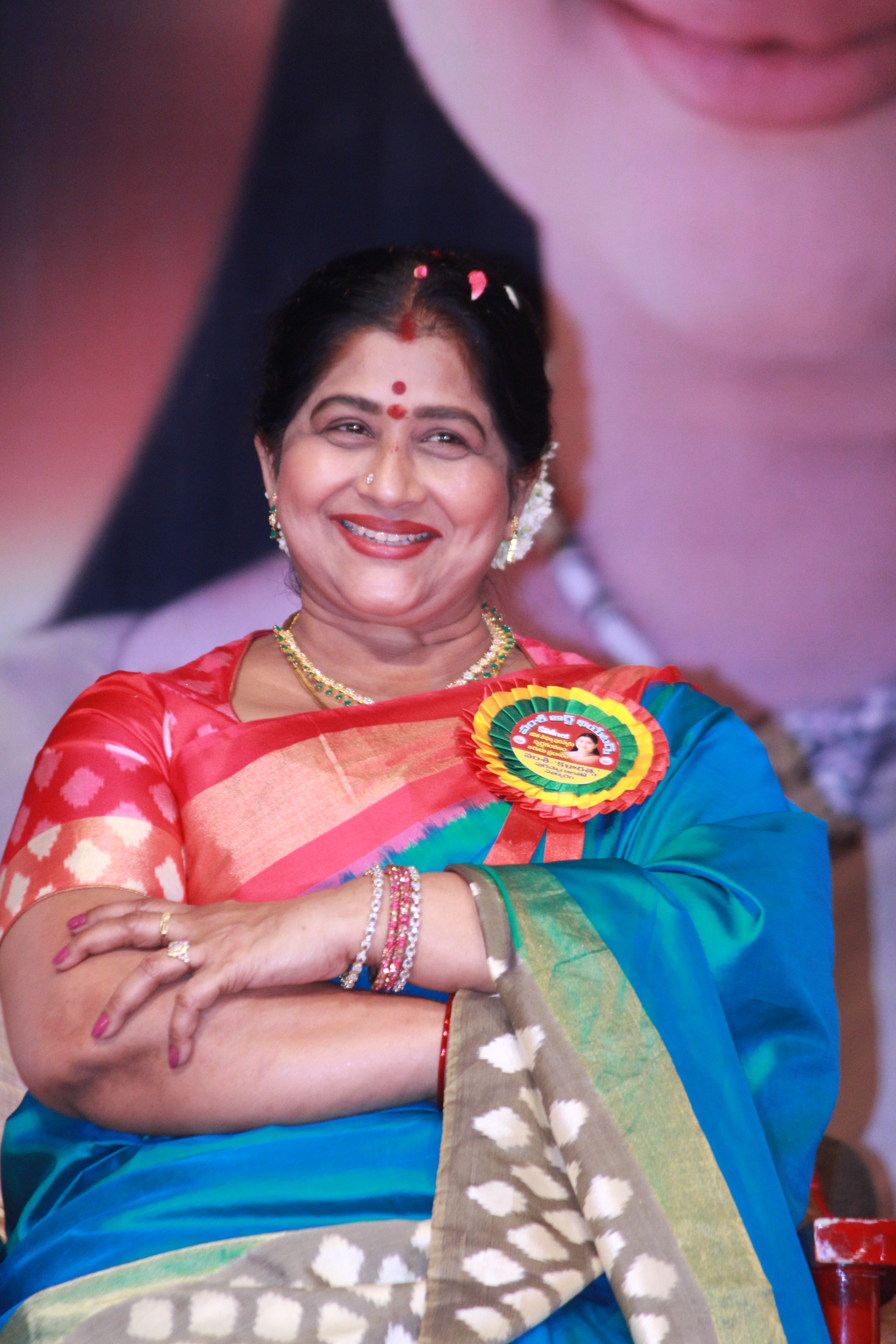
- Born: Kavitha Dasaratharaj; 28 September 1965 (age 61)
- Occupations: Actress, Politician
- Years active: 1976–1984 (Lead actress); 1991–present (Supporting actress)
- Political party: Bharatiya Janata Party
- Spouse: Dasaratharaj (m. 1983; died 2021)
- Children: 3

Kavitha Dasaratharaj, known professionally as Kavitha, is an Indian actress and politician who predominantly works in Telugu, Tamil and Kannada film industries, she also acted in few Malayalam movies as well. She has done supporting roles in Telugu-language movies like Meenakshi (2005), Chethilo Cheyyesi (2010), Yugalageetham (2010) and Aada Paandavulu (2013).

== Personal life ==
She is a Telugu and hails from Andhra Pradesh. She joined the Telugu Desam Party in 2008. Her husband and her son died due to COVID-19 in 2021.

== Awards ==
List of Kavitha awards
| Year | Award | Category | Result | Ref. |
|---|---|---|---|---|
| 2020 | Zee Tamizh Kudumbha Viruthugal 2020 | Contribution to Cinema & Series | Won | |

== Filmography ==
This list is incomplete; you can help by expanding it.

| Year | Film | Role | Language | Notes |
|---|---|---|---|---|
| 1976 | Oh Manju | Manju | Tamil | Debut Film (credited as Kumari Kavitha) |
| 1976 | Siri Siri Muvva | Savithri | Telugu | Debut in Telugu |
| 1977 | Seeta Geeta Daatithe | Seetha | Telugu | |
| 1977 | Adavi Ramudu | | Telugu | |
| 1977 | Rowdy Rakkamma | Lalitha | Tamil | |
| 1977 | Aalukkoru Aasai | Kalpana | Tamil | |
| 1977 | Sahodara Sabatham | Jyothi | Tamil | |
| 1977 | Aattukara Alamelu | Radha | Tamil | |
| 1977 | Kalamadi Kalam | Kavitha | Tamil | |
| 1977 | Sahodarara Savaal | Jyothi | Kannada | |
| 1977 | Rishya Shringa | | Kannada | |
| 1978 | Lawyer Viswanath | Gowri | Telugu | |
| 1978 | Cheppindi Chestha | | Telugu | |
| 1978 | Aval Thandha Uravu | | Tamil | |
| 1978 | Kaatrinile Varum Geetham | Geetha/Kamini/Rosy | Tamil | |
| 1978 | Andaman Kadhali | Kavitha | Tamil | |
| 1978 | Ganga Yamuna Kaveri | Anitha | Tamil | |
| 1978 | Alli Darbar | Malliga | Tamil | |
| 1978 | General Chakravarthi | Rani | Tamil | |
| 1978 | Kiladi Kittu | | Kannada | |
| 1978 | Aanayum Ambaariyum | | Malayalam | |
| 1978 | Black Belt | | Malayalam | |
| 1979 | Punadhirallu | Radha | Telugu | |
| 1979 | President Peramma | | Telugu | |
| 1979 | Andadu Aagadu | Padma | Telugu | |
| 1979 | Captain Krishna | | Telugu | |
| 1979 | Iddaru Asadhyule | | Telugu | |
| 1979 | Neeya? | Icchhadhari Snake (2nd form) | Tamil | |
| 1979 | Pancharatnam | | Malayalam | |
| 1980 | Aarani Mantalu | Latha | Telugu | |
| 1980 | Venkateswara Vratha Mahatyam | Kalyani | Telugu | |
| 1980 | Sarada Ramudu | Padma | Telugu | |
| 1980 | Nakili Manishi | Susheela | Telugu | |
| 1980 | Badai Basavayya | Ratnakumari aka Baby | Telugu | |
| 1980 | Adrushtavanthudu | Gowri | Telugu | |
| 1980 | Alludu Pattina Bharatam | Radha | Telugu | |
| 1980 | Chuttalunnaru Jagratha | | Telugu | |
| 1980 | Agni Sanskaram | | Telugu | |
| 1980 | Grahanam Vidichindi | | Telugu | |
| 1980 | Sannayi Appanna | | Telugu | |
| 1980 | Mogudu Kaavali | | Telugu | |
| 1980 | Subbarayudu Subbalakshmi | | Telugu | |
| 1980 | Rakta Bandham | | Telugu | |
| 1980 | Bommala Koluvu | | Telugu | |
| 1980 | Parijatham | | Telugu | |
| 1980 | Moogaku Maatosthe | | Telugu | |
| 1980 | Thathayya Premaleelalu | | Telugu | |
| 1980 | Engal Vathiyar | Lakshmi | Tamil | |
| 1981 | Oorukichchina Maata | Sita | Telugu | |
| 1981 | Srirasthu Subhamasthu | | Telugu | |
| 1981 | Nayudu Gari Abbayi | | Telugu | |
| 1981 | Jeevitha Ratham | Sathya | Telugu | |
| 1981 | Srivari Muchatlu | | Telugu | |
| 1981 | Premabhishekam | Kalpana | Telugu | |
| 1981 | Aggi Ravva | Menaka | Telugu | |
| 1981 | Chinnaari Chittibabu | | Telugu | |
| 1981 | Gola Nagamma | | Telugu | |
| 1981 | Amrutha Kalasam | | Telugu | |
| 1981 | Aval Oru Kaviyam | Geetha | Tamil | |
| 1981 | Ellam Inba Mayyam | | Tamil | |
| 1982 | Prathigna | Roja | Telugu | |
| 1982 | Nipputho Chelagatam | | Telugu | |
| 1982 | Gruha Pravesam | | Telugu | |
| 1982 | Kadali Vachina Kanakadurga | | Telugu | |
| 1982 | Pellilla Perayya | | Telugu | |
| 1982 | Jagannatha Rathachakralu | Latha | Telugu | |
| 1982 | Kaliyuga Ramudu | Savitri | Telugu | |
| 1982 | Doctor Cine Actor | Latha | Telugu | |
| 1982 | Iddaru Kodukulu | Sundari | Telugu | |
| 1982 | Savaal | | Telugu | |
| 1982 | Anuraga Devatha | | Telugu | |
| 1982 | Bangaru Bhoomi | Tulasi | Telugu | |
| 1982 | Ekalavya | | Telugu | |
| 1983 | Moogavani Paga | Rani | Telugu | |
| 1983 | Prema Pichollu | | Telugu | |
| 1983 | Chandi Chamundi | | Telugu | |
| 1983 | Ee Desamlo Oka Roju | | Telugu | |
| 1983 | Kalyana Veena | | Telugu | |
| 1983 | Akka Mogudu Chelleli Kapuram | | Telugu | |
| 1983 | Agni Jwala | | Telugu | |
| 1983 | Bandipotu Rudramma | | Telugu | |
| 1983 | Chandi Rani | | Telugu | |
| 1983 | Kaliyuga Dheivam | | Telugu | |
| 1983 | Palleturi Pidugu | Chitti and Rani | Telugu | |
| 1983 | Kanthayya Kanakayya | Radha | Telugu | |
| 1983 | Chanda Sasanudu | Jayasri | Telugu | |
| 1983 | Pralaya Gharjana | | Telugu | |
| 1983 | Grahanam Vidichindi | | Telugu | |
| 1983 | Mayagadu | Jyothi | Telugu | |
| 1983 | Pichi Pantulu | | Telugu | |
| 1983 | Makkale Devaru | | Kannada | |
| 1984 | Sardar | Gowri | Telugu | |
| 1984 | Daku Rani Himmatwali | | Telugu | |
| 1984 | Kalalu Kane Kallu | | Telugu | |
| 1984 | Srimadvirat Veerabrahmendra Swami Charitra | Pollama | Telugu | |
| 1987 | Prema Deepalu | | Telugu | |
| 1988 | Kadina Benki | | Kannada | |
| 1991 | Ganga | | Telugu | |
| 1991 | Amma Rajinama | | Telugu | |
| 1991 | Vaidehi Kalyanam | | Tamil | |
| 1992 | Peddarikam | Lalitha | Telugu | |
| 1992 | Hello Darling | | Telugu | |
| 1992 | Sevagan | | Tamil | |
| 1992 | Ilavarasan | Lakshmi | Tamil | |
| 1992 | Natchathira Nayagan | Kavitha | Tamil | |
| 1992 | Thambi Pondatti | Lakshmi | Tamil | |
| 1992 | Nadodi Thendral | | Tamil | |
| 1992 | Senthamizh Paattu | Rajeswari | Tamil | |
| 1992 | Naalaiya Theerpu | | Tamil | |
| 1992 | Mappillai Vanthachu | | Tamil | |
| 1992 | Muthal Seethanam | | Tamil | |
| 1992 | Sahasi | | Kannada | |
| 1992 | Kaliyuga Seethe | | Kannada | |
| 1993 | Amaravathi | Balasubramaniam's wife | Tamil | |
| 1993 | Kattabomman | Saroja | Tamil | |
| 1993 | Uzhaippali | | Tamil | |
| 1993 | Akkarai Cheemayile | | Tamil | |
| 1993 | Kattalai | | Tamil | |
| 1993 | Arthana | | Malayalam | |
| 1994 | Teerpu | Kalyani | Telugu | |
| 1994 | Namaste Anna | | Telugu | |
| 1994 | Aranmanai Kaavalan | | Tamil | |
| 1994 | Kaadhalan | Shruthi's mother | Tamil | |
| 1994 | Sadhu | | Tamil | |
| 1994 | Rajakumaran | | Tamil | |
| 1994 | Sindhu Nathi Poo | Azhamu | Tamil | |
| 1994 | Seeman | | Tamil | |
| 1994 | Vanaja Girija | | Tamil | |
| 1994 | Thamarai | | Tamil | |
| 1994 | Sathyavan | | Tamil | |
| 1994 | Manasu Rendum Pudhusu | | Tamil | |
| 1995 | Server Sundaram Gari Abbayi | | Telugu | |
| 1995 | Aayanaki Iddaru | | Telugu | |
| 1995 | Thai Thangai Paasam | | Tamil | |
| 1995 | Mannukku Mariyadhai | Lakshmi | Tamil | |
| 1995 | Chellakannu | Kamalamba | Tamil | |
| 1995 | Ilaya Ragam | | Tamil | |
| 1995 | Putnanja | | Kannada | |
| 1995 | Police Power | | Kannada | |
| 1995 | Agnidevan | | Malayalam | |
| 1995 | Sargavasantham | | Malayalam | |
| 1996 | Ninne Pelladata | | Telugu | |
| 1996 | Akkada Ammayi Ikkada Abbayi | Rajeswari | Telugu | |
| 1996 | Mr. Romeo | | Tamil | |
| 1996 | Kalloori Vaasal | Sathya's mother | Tamil | |
| 1996 | Summa Irunga Machan | Rajamma | Tamil | |
| 1996 | Irattai Roja | | Tamil | |
| 1996 | Alexander | | Tamil | |
| 1996 | Priyam | | Tamil | |
| 1996 | Thuraimugam | Punniyalakshmi | Tamil | |
| 1996 | Mettukudi | | Tamil | |
| 1996 | Take It Easy Urvashi | | Tamil | |
| 1996 | Avathara Purushan | | Tamil | |
| 1996 | Andha Naal | Lakshmi | Tamil | |
| 1996 | Shiva Leele | | Kannada | |
| 1997 | High Class Atha - Low Class Alludu | | Telugu | |
| 1997 | Raasi | Karpagam | Tamil | |
| 1997 | Ratchagan | | Tamil | |
| 1997 | Kaadhali | | Tamil | |
| 1997 | Poochudava | | Tamil | |
| 1997 | Kalyana Vaibhogam | | Tamil | |
| 1997 | Aahaa Enna Porutham | | Tamil | |
| 1997 | Ranganna | | Kannada | |
| 1997 | Mahabharatha | | Kannada | |
| 1997 | C.B.I. Durga | | Kannada | |
| 1997 | Akka | | Kannada | |
| 1998 | Prema Pallaki | | Telugu | |
| 1998 | Priyuralu | | Telugu | |
| 1998 | Naam Iruvar Namakku Iruvar | | Tamil | |
| 1998 | Kumbakonam Gopalu | | Tamil | |
| 1998 | Aval Varuvala | Roobini | Tamil | |
| 1999 | Swayamvaram | | Telugu | |
| 1999 | Sambiah | | Telugu | |
| 1999 | Vichitram | Kaveri | Telugu | |
| 1999 | Poovellam Kettuppar | | Tamil | |
| 1999 | Poomaname Vaa | | Tamil | |
| 1999 | Suyamvaram | Savithri's mother | Tamil | |
| 1999 | Mr. Kokila | | Kannada | |
| 1999 | Hrudaya Hrudaya | | Kannada | |
| 1999 | Friends | | Malayalam | |
| 2000 | Unakkaga Mattum | | Tamil | |
| 2000 | Jeeboomba | | Kannada | |
| 2001 | Pandavar Bhoomi | Dhanalakshmi | Tamil | |
| 2002 | Nee Premakai | | Telugu | |
| 2002 | Mounamelanoyi | | Telugu | |
| 2002 | Holi | | Telugu | |
| 2002 | Red | | Tamil | |
| 2002 | Gummalam | | Tamil | |
| 2002 | Super Star | | Kannada | |
| 2002 | Kambala Halli | | Kannada | |
| 2002 | H2O | | Kannada | |
| 2002 | Boothayyana Makkalu | | Kannada | |
| 2003 | Dhanush | | Telugu | |
| 2003 | Dham | | Telugu | |
| 2003 | Chandra Chakori | | Kannada | |
| 2003 | Miyyav | | Kannada | |
| 2004 | Enjoy | | Telugu | |
| 2004 | Intlo Srimathi Veedhilo Kumari | | Telugu | |
| 2004 | Gudumba Shankar | | Telugu | |
| 2004 | Andaru Dongale Dorikite | | Telugu | |
| 2004 | Apparao Driving School | | Telugu | |
| 2004 | Arasatchi | | Tamil | |
| 2005 | Allari Pidugu | | Telugu | |
| 2005 | Prayatnam | | Telugu | |
| 2005 | Soggadu | | Telugu | |
| 2005 | Pourusham | | Telugu | |
| 2005 | Danger | | Telugu | |
| 2005 | Meenakshi | | Telugu | |
| 2005 | Adirindayya Chandram | | Telugu | |
| 2005 | Premikulu | | Telugu | |
| 2005 | Boyfriend | | Kannada | |
| 2006 | Asadhyudu | | Telugu | |
| 2006 | Seetharamudu | | Telugu | |
| 2006 | Brahmastram | | Telugu | |
| 2006 | Suyetchai MLA | | Tamil | |
| 2006 | A Aa E Ee | | Kannada | |
| 2006 | Honeymoon Express | | Kannada | |
| 2007 | Madhumasam | | Telugu | |
| 2007 | Yamagola Malli Modalayindi | | Telugu | |
| 2007 | Viyyalavari Kayyalu | | Telugu | |
| 2007 | Aarya | Aarya's mother | Tamil | |
| 2008 | Ullasamga Utsahamga | | Telugu | |
| 2008 | Ardham Chesukoru | | Telugu | |
| 2008 | Kuberulu | | Telugu | |
| 2008 | Hrudaya I Miss You | | Kannada | |
| 2008 | Nee Tata Naa Birla | | Kannada | |
| 2009 | A Aa E Ee | | Telugu | |
| 2009 | Samrajyam | | Telugu | |
| 2009 | Mogudu Kavali | | Telugu | |
| 2009 | Madhavi | Savitri | Tamil | |
| 2009 | Ullasa Utsaha | | Kannada | |
| 2010 | Ramdev | | Telugu | |
| 2010 | Yugalageetham | | Telugu | |
| 2010 | Glamour | | Telugu | |
| 2010 | Chalaki | | Telugu | |
| 2010 | Chethilo Cheyyesi | | Telugu | |
| 2011 | Madatha Kaja | | Telugu | |
| 2011 | Galli Kurrollu | | Telugu | |
| 2011 | Maaro | | Telugu | |
| 2011 | Keratam | | Telugu | |
| 2011 | Thrilling | | Telugu | |
| 2011 | Sankranti Alludu | | Telugu | |
| 2011 | Yuvan | | Tamil | |
| 2012 | Sri Vasavi Vaibhavam | | Telugu | |
| 2012 | Damarukam | | Telugu | |
| 2012 | Idhayam Thiraiarangam | | Tamil | |
| 2013 | Aada Paandavulu | | Telugu | |
| 2013 | Yesu Kristu Rendava Rakada | | Telugu | |
| 2015 | Sri Manikanta Mahimalu | | Telugu | |
| 2016 | Narathan | Kamala | Tamil | |
| 2017 | Winner | | Telugu | |
| 2017 | Premika | | Telugu | |
| 2018 | 2 Friends | | Telugu | |
| 2020 | Baggidi Gopal | | Telugu | |
| 2020 | Lingadu Ramalingadu | | Telugu | |
| 2021 | Nuvvu Nenu Okkatite | | Telugu | |
| 2021 | Raave Naa Cheliya | | Telugu | |
| 2024 | Purushothamudu | | Telugu | |

== Television ==
| Year | Title | Role | Language | Channel |
|---|---|---|---|---|
| 1999–2000 | Anubandham | | Telugu | Gemini TV |
| | Agnisakshi | | Telugu | E TV |
| 2014–2017 | Mooga Manasulu | Chayadevi | Telugu | Zee Telugu |
| 2017 | Ganga | Rudhramma | Tamil | Sun TV |
| 2018–2019 | Nandini | Selva Rani; Rama Prabha | Tamil; Kannada | Sun TV; Udaya TV |
| 2020–2022 | Endrendrum Punnagai | Aandal | Tamil | Zee Tamil |
| 2021 | Oohalu Gusagusalade | Visalakshi | Telugu | Zee Telugu |
| 2022 | No.1 Kodalu | Gnanambika | Telugu | Zee Telugu |
| 2023–2024 | Ala Venkatapuramlo | Pramodini | Telugu | GeminiTV |
| 2024–Present | Sivangi | Nirmala Devi | Telugu | Gemini TV |
| 2026–Present | Annam | Amaravathi | Tamil | Sun TV |
