= Aarani Mantalu =

- Theatrical release poster
- Directed by: K. Vasu
- Produced by: K. Mahendra & Tripuramallu Venkateswarlu
- Starring: Chiranjeevi; Kavitha
- Music by: Satyam
- Production company: T.V. Films
- Release date: 1980
- Country: India
- Language: Telugu

Aarani Mantalu is a Telugu film starring Chiranjeevi and Kavitha. It was the first Chiranjeevi film to be dubbed to Tamil. In the Tamil dubbed version, editor Mohan dubbed for Chiranjeevi, the well known producer and father of Tamil director Mohan Raja and Actor Jayam Ravi.

== Plot ==
Ravi's (Chiranjeevi) sister Sarada (Subhashini) is raped and murdered by a gang of four, who is acquitted. Ravi gets revenge on the four rapists by killing each of them, but he finds each of them dead beforehand.

== Cast ==
- Chiranjeevi as Ravi
- Kavitha as Latha
- Prasad Babu as Inspector Madhu
- Subhashini as Sarada
- Hari Babu
- Ceylon Manohar as David
- Navakanth
- Jayamalini
- Giri Babu as Giri
- Raavi Kondala Rao as Latha's father
- Rallapalli as constable
- R. Narayana Murthy as rowdy
