= Sabash Sariyana Potti =

- Theatrical release poster
- Directed by: Venu Arvind
- Written by: Venu Arvind
- Produced by: V. R. Raghunathan
- Starring: Jayaram; Sriram Karthik; Anjana Thambiratti; Venu Arvind
- Cinematography: Krish Kymal
- Edited by: AL. Ramesh
- Music by: Thaman S
- Production company: Dwaraka Movies
- Release date: 27 May 2011
- Country: India
- Language: Tamil

Sabash Sariyana Potti (transl. Bravo, an excellent competition) is a 2011 Indian Tamil-language comedy film directed by television actor Venu Arvind which marked his directorial debut. The film stars Jayaram, Sriram Karthik, Anjana Thambiratti and himself. The film has a musical score by Thaman S. The film received negative reviews. The name of the film is based on a dialogue from the song "Kannum Kannum Kalanthu". It was partially reshot in Malayalam as Kochi to Kodambakkam the following year.

== Cast ==
- Jayaram as JR
- Sriram Karthik as Gnana Guru
- Anjana Thambiratti as Ranjani
- Sriranjani as Gnana Guru's mother.
- Venu Arvind as John
- Delhi Ganesh as Subbu
- Vaiyapuri as Dass
- Mayilsamy as Mani
- Deepa Narendra as Jency
- Latha Rao as Megala
- Valentina (Trisha Alex) as Roopa
- Kaali Venkat as Sekhar
- Fathima Babu as "Sabash Sariyana Potti" judge
- Mohan Raman as "Sabash Sariyana Potti" judge
- Shankar Narayanan as OTV CEO
- Vadivel Balaji as himself (uncredited appearance in the song "Nenjathin Jin Jin")

== Soundtrack ==
The music was composed by S. Thaman.

Sabash Sariyana Potti

Soundtrack album by Thaman S
- Released: 17 April 2011
- Genre: Feature film soundtrack
- Length: 18:43
- Language: Tamil

Thaman S chronology
Mambattiyan (2011)	Sabash Sariyana Potti (2011)	Veera (2011)

No.	Song	Singers	Lyrics	Length (m:ss)
1	"Mudhal Mozhi"	Rahul Nambiar	Kadhirmozhi	4:16
2	"Vandhutanya"	Ranjith	Na. Muthukumar	3:24
3	"Nenjathin Jin Jin"	Naveen Madhan, Rahul Nambiar	Kadhal Madhi	4:35
4	"Ullam Thudikudha"	Thaman S	Tharangai Surya	2:55
5	"Odu Mamey"	Rita	Na. Muthukumar	3:29
5	"Plus Plus"	Sagar, Devi Sri Prasad, Vineeth Sreenivasan	Vineeth Sreenivasan	2:16

== Release ==
The New Indian Express wrote that "But as it happens many a time, what may have seemed good on paper, is just not exciting enough when translated on to screen".
