= Doctor Cine Actor =

1982 film

- Theatrical release poster
- Directed by: Vijaya Nirmala
- Screenplay by: Vijaya Nirmala
- Story by: Pinishetty
- Produced by: Kolluri Sriramchandra Murthy; K.L. Narasimhulu
- Starring: Krishna; Jayasudha; Kavitha
- Cinematography: Pushtala Gopikrishna
- Edited by: Adurthi Harinath
- Music by: K. Chakravarthy
- Production company: Nara Naryana Combines
- Distributed by: Sri Films (Andhra)
- Release date: 9 April 1982
- Running time: 142 minutes
- Country: India
- Language: Telugu

Doctor Cine Actor is a 1982 Indian Telugu-language comedy drama film directed by Vijaya Nirmala. Produced by Nara Naryana Combines, it stars Krishna in a triple role alongside Jayasudha and Kavitha. The film has music composed by K. Chakravarthy.

Doctor Cine Actor was released on 9 April 1982. It was moderately successful at the box office.

== Plot ==
Madhu is a talented doctor who earns several laurels with his research. He strives to make his cousin Raju a doctor like him but Raju is interested only in films. Raju also wins a prize by portraying Chatrapati Sivaji in a play. Upon being insulted by Madhu for wasting his time, a depressed Raju leaves his home. Raju's childhood sweetheart Radha gives him money to move to Madras.

Raju struggles a lot in Madras for opportunities. One day, he obtains a small role and uses the opportunity to the maximum to get a break. He soon rises to become a bonafide star and earns millions of rupees. Meanwhile, film director Srikanth's wife and popular actress Ranjani tries to get close to Raju. Raju, however, rejects her advances and marries Radha. Madhu has meanwhile married Latha. Slowly, Madhu and Raju cope with each other. Following a ghastly incident, Raju hands his baby boy to Madhu and Radha for safekeeping.

Srikanth and Rajani scheme and manage to get Raju on board for their next film. While Rajani lusts for Raju, Srikanth intends to damage his career. Raju realizes this and punishes them for their sins, and returns home.

== Cast ==
- Krishna in a quadruple role as:
  - Madhu (doctor)
  - Raju (aspiring actor)
  - Dr. Prabhakar (Madhu's father - Raju's maternal uncle)
  - Chatrapati Sivaji (cameo)
- Jayasudha as Radha
- Kavitha as Latha
- Kaikala Satyanarayana as Srikanth
- Allu Ramalingaiah as Natasam
- Narasimha Raju as Dr.Gopi
- Ravikanth
- Ch. Krishna Murthy as Ranganna
- Vallam Narasimha Rao
- Subhashini as Ranjana
- Mamatha as Durga
- Suryakantham as Kanthamma
- Pushpa Kumari
- Kakinada Shyamala
- Geetha
- K. J. Saradhi
- Kanta Rao as Prof. Madhava Rao
- Nagesh
- Mada
- Jagga Rao
- Thota Subbarao

=== Cameo appearances ===
- N. T. Rama Rao as himself
- Sobhan Babu as himself
- D. Ramanaidu as himself
- Dasari Narayana Rao as himself
- Katta Subba Rao as himself

== Production ==
The film marks Krishna's second appearance in a triple role. He plays a son and nephew who look alike. The film has score and soundtrack composed by K. Chakravarthy. The lyrics were written by Veturi and Appalacharya, with vocals by S. P. Balasubrahmanyam, P. Susheela and S. Janaki.

== Reception ==
Reviewing the film for Andhra Patrika on 14 April 1982, C. S. B. appreciated the performances and technical aspects, adding, "Direction by Vijaya Nirmala appeals to all sections of audience." Gudipoodi Srihari of Sitara magazine on the review dated 25 April 1982, called the Doctor Cine Actor "a film within a film." Srihari felt that the focus was more on the actor part, and a few unnecessary scenes dragged down the screenplay.
