= Qaidi (1984 film) =

- Theatrical release poster
- Directed by: S S Ravichandra
- Written by: Kader Khan(dialogues); Indeevar(lyrics)
- Based on: Khaidi (1983) by Paruchuri Brothers
- Produced by: G. Hanumantha Rao; Krishna(Presents)
- Starring: Jeetendra; Shatrughan Sinha; Hema Malini; Madhavi
- Cinematography: V.S.R. Swamy
- Edited by: K. Gopal Rao
- Music by: Bappi Lahiri
- Production company: Padmalaya Studios
- Release date: 18 May 1984
- Running time: 150 minutes
- Country: India
- Language: Hindi

Qaidi (transl. Prisoner) is a 1984 Indian Hindi-language action film, produced by G. Hanumantha Rao by Padmalaya Studios, presented by Krishna and directed by S.S. Ravichandra. It stars Jeetendra, Shatrughan Sinha, Hema Malini, Madhavi and music composed by Bappi Lahiri. Qaidi is remake of the 1983 Telugu film Khaidi. Madhavi reprised her role from the original version.

== Cast ==
- Jeetendra as Suraj
- Shatrughan Sinha as ASP Dinesh Jugran
- Hema Malini as Dr. Sunita
- Madhavi as Preeti
- Vidya Sinha as Seeta
- Ranjeet as Raghu
- Shakti Kapoor as Sudarshanlal
- Kader Khan as Bansilal
- Asrani as Sharma
- Bharat Bhushan as Yashpal
- Urmila Bhatt as Mrs. Jugran (Dinesh's Mother)
- Sujit Kumar as Police Inspector Vikas Kumar
- Dev Kumar as Jagga
- Silk Smitha as Dancer In Song "Baango Baango Baango"

== Music ==
The music of the film is composed by Bappi Lahiri and lyrics are penned by Indeevar.

No.	Title	Singer(s)	Length
1.	"Komal Madhur Chatur Chapal Tera Har Ang, Sarbang Sundari"	Kishore Kumar, Lata Mangeshkar
2.	"Jawani Ka Khazana Hai, Romance Ka Zamana Hai"	Kishore Kumar, Asha Bhosle
3.	"Chandni Raat Hai Sanam, Nahin Premiyon Ko Jannat Se Kam"	Kishore Kumar, Asha Bhosle
4.	"Sanwali Se Hai Mujhe Pyar, Goriya Dafa Karo"	Kishore Kumar, Asha Bhosle
5.	"Baango Baango Baango"	Asha Bhosle
