= Viduthalai (1986 film) =

- Theatrical release poster
- Directed by: K. Vijayan
- Written by: Aaroor Dass (dialogues)
- Story by: K. K. Shukla
- Produced by: Suresh Balaje
- Starring: Sivaji Ganesan; Rajinikanth; Vishnuvardhan
- Cinematography: Tiwari; Suresh Chandra Menon (second unit)
- Edited by: D. Vasu
- Music by: Chandrabose
- Production company: Sujatha Cine Arts
- Release date: 11 April 1986
- Running time: 141 minutes
- Country: India
- Language: Tamil

Viduthalai (transl. Liberation) is a 1986 Indian Tamil-language action heist film, directed by K. Vijayan. It stars Sivaji Ganesan, Rajinikanth and Vishnuvardhan. The film was a box-office failure. It is a remake of the 1980 Hindi film Qurbani, which itself was based on the 1972 Italian film The Master Touch.

== Plot ==
Raja, an expert thief, is in love with Radha, a disco club dancer-cum-singer, who is unaware of Raja's profession. Meanwhile, an evil brother-sister duo, Vikram and Bhairavi is bent on seeking vengeance from Crime boss Sudharshan, who cheated and siphoned Bhairavi's money. The duo hire Raja to break into Sudarshan's treasury and perform the heist. But he was caught by a jovial-cum-shrewd Inspector Rajasingam and awarded 2 years imprisonment, which shocks and devastates Radha.

On the other hand, Amar is an ace crime member in Sudarshan's gang who revolts against Sudarshan. He is a widower with a daughter who is studying in a boarding school. However, before quitting Sudarshan's gang, Amar has committed a crime wearing a mask and Inspector Rajasingam is investigating that case. Once Amar saves Radha from a gang of rowdy bikers. They meet regularly as Radha likes Amar's daughter. Soon Amar begins to love Radha, who does not reciprocate because she still loves Raja. Amar realises Radha is not interested and does not proceed. Raja completes his jail sentence. While returning, he meets Vikram, who again reminds him of the deal to rob Sudarshan. During the conversation, Amar incidentally reaches the site and a fist fight ensues between Amar and Vikram. While fleeing, Vikram swears revenge against Amar. Thus Raja and Amar meet for the first time. Raja takes Amar to introduce to Radha, but both Radha and Amar pretend as if they do not know each other since they don't want Raja to unnecessarily suspect them.

Later Vikram's goons kidnap Amar's daughter and beat Amar who is hospitalised. In return for Amar and his daughter's safety, Raja agrees to do Vikram's job. He nurses Amar back to normal and soon they turn thick friends. Amar promises Raja he will support him in this one last robbery. They plan to shift to London after the robbery with the money. They concoct a scheme whereby Amar would steal gold bars and jewellery from a safe, then phone the police, let Raja take over, get arrested, get a prison term for about 12 to 18 months. After his release, he will join Amar in the USA Things go awry as Raja gets arrested for killing Sudarshan while Amar and Radha reach USA with the money. Raja construes that Amar deliberately framed him so that he can get Raja out of the way, and keep all the money (as well as Radha) for himself. Raja escapes from jail and reaches London to apprehend Amar. After a brief tussle between the two, Raja realises the truth and that Amar did not frame him. Vikram and his goons reach USA to take revenge against Raja and Amar. During the ensuing fight, Amar sacrifices his life to save Raja from getting killed by Vikram.

== Cast ==
- Sivaji Ganesan as Inspector Rajasingam
- Rajinikanth as Raja
- Vishnuvardhan as Amar
- Madhavi as Radha, Raja's love interest
- Vijayakumar as Vikram
- K. Balaji as Dayalu
- R. N. Sudarshan as Madhanagopal
- Y. G. Mahendran as Balu (cameo appearance)
- Thengai Srinivasan as Stepfather of Raja
- Anuradha as Bhairavi, Vikram's sister
- V. Gopalakrishnan as Inspector of police
- C. R. Parthiban as an actor portraying Jackson Durai
- Baby Shalini as Shalini, amar's daughter
- Bindu Ghosh

== Production ==
Balaji, who saw Qurbani decided to remake it in Tamil. He wanted Rajinikanth to play Feroz Khan's character and Ganesan to play Amjad Khan's character. Ganesan agreed to play the role. The dialogue for the remake was written by Aaroor Das.

== Soundtrack ==
All music is composed by Chandrabose

Track listing
No.	Title	Lyrics	Singer(s)	Length
1.	"Nattukulla Namma Pathi"	Pulamaipithan	Malaysia Vasudevan, S. P. Sailaja and chorus	06:11
2.	"Raagam Naanethan"	Pulamaipithan	S. Janaki and chorus	04:02
3.	"Rajave Raja"	Pulamaipithan	S. P. Balasubrahmanyam, S. Janaki and chorus	04:55
4.	"Neela Kuyilgal Rendu"	Vaali	S. P. Balasubrahmanyam, Chandrabose	04:46
5.	"Thangamani Rangamani"	Vaali	S. P. Balasubrahmanyam, Vani Jairam	03:59
Total length:				23:53

== Release and reception ==
Kalki printed a favourable review, calling it a return to form for Rajinikanth after a while. Despite this, the film was a box-office failure.
