= Chanakya (1984 film) =

- VCD cover
- Directed by: V. Somashekhar
- Written by: Chi. Udaya Shankar
- Screenplay by: M. D. Sundar
- Story by: M. D. Sundar
- Produced by: M. D. Sundar
- Starring: Vishnuvardhan; Madhavi; Vajramuni; Shivaram
- Cinematography: H. G. Raju
- Edited by: P. Bhakthavathsalam
- Music by: Satyam
- Production company: Sundara Fine Arts
- Distributed by: Sundara Fine Arts
- Release date: 7 November 1984
- Running time: 160 min
- Country: India
- Language: Kannada

Chanakya is a 1984 Indian Kannada film, directed by V. Somashekhar and produced by M. D. Sundar. The film stars Vishnuvardhan, Madhavi, Vajramuni and Shivaram.

== Cast ==
- Vishnuvardhan as Lawyer Srikanth
- Madhavi as Dr. Radha
- Vajramuni
- Shivaram
- Mukhyamantri Chandru as Basant Kumar
- Sudarshan as Murthy
- Lohithaswa as Justice Jagannath Rao, Srikanth's father
- Leelavathi as Savithri, Jagannath Rao's wife
- Srinivasa Murthy as Inspector Ramesh, Radha's brother
- Shani Mahadevappa as Ramanath, Murthy's father
- Rathnakar
- B. K. Shankar
- Tomato Somu
- Master Chethan
- Hanumanthachar
- Brahmavar
- V. L. Acharya
- Shashikumar
- Jaggu
- Shanthamma
- Devishree
- Lalitha
- Shashikala
- Roopa Chakravarthy
