= Ratha Paasam (1980 film) =

- Theatrical release poster
- Directed by: K. Vijayan (uncredited); Sivaji Ganesan
- Written by: A. L. Narayanan (dialogues)
- Story by: G. Ramkumar
- Produced by: Santhi Narayanasamy; T. Manohar
- Starring: Sivaji Ganesan; Sripriya; M. N. Nambiar; Major Sundarrajan
- Cinematography: T. S. Vinayagam
- Edited by: B. Kandasamy
- Music by: M. S. Viswanathan
- Production company: Sivaji Productions
- Release date: 14 June 1980
- Country: India
- Language: Tamil

Ratha Paasam (transl. Blood affection) is a 1980 Indian Tamil-language action drama film directed by K. Vijayan and Sivaji Ganesan. The film was produced by Santhi Narayanasamy and T. Manohar, and stars Ganesan, Sripriya, M. N. Nambiar and Major Sundarrajan. It was released on 14 June 1980.

== Plot ==
The story follows Raja Sr., an Indian ruler with two wives—one British and the other one Indian. He has two sons, one from each marriage. When the British wife develops cancer, Raja Sr. travels abroad with her for treatment, but they both die in an accident. Their son, Sivaji, who is now known as Raja, inherits the family's overseas properties and business.

In India, the younger son, Sivaji, is a police officer who arrests three notorious criminals (played by Nambiar, Mohan Babu and Manohar). The criminals escape prison, murder Sivaji's family and leave him for dead. The only survivors are Sivaji's sister, Jayachitra, who is studying abroad, and his fiancée, Sripriya, who remains in the city.

Jayachitra, unaware that her benefactor overseas is Raja, befriends his manager Jai Ganesh who has a son but is divorced and marries him with Elder Sivaji's blessings. Sripriya searches and traces the three criminals for vengeance and finds help in the fourth Sivaji who is a complete stranger but agrees to help her. After killing the two of them, it is revealed that the fourth Sivaji is none other than her own betrothed who is undercover.

Raja and younger Sivaji take on the threat of Nambiar and kill him along with his henchmen. Raja too dies in the process leaving everything to the younger Sivaji.

== Cast ==
- Sivaji Ganesan Raja Sr./Raja Jr./Younger son/stranger
- Sripriya as Radha
- M. N. Nambiar as Arjun Das
- Major Sundarrajan as D.I.J. Jagannath
- Thengai Srinivasan
- Jai Ganesh as Shankar
- Prameela as Asha
- Jayachitra as Gayathri
- Mohan Babu as Swaraj
- R. S. Manohar as Martin
- Pushpalatha as Senior Sivaji's wife
- Manorama

== Production ==
Several scenes were filmed in Ganesan's home, Annai Illam. Due to director Vijayan being unable to complete more than half of the film, Ganesan took over direction of the remaining portions. However, the title credits did not include the director's name; instead, they featured close-up photographs of Ganesan.

== Soundtrack ==
The film's original soundtrack was composed by M. S. Viswanathan, while the lyrics were penned by Kannadasan.

Track listing
No.	Title	Singer(s)	Length
1.	"Asai Theerap Pesa Vendum"	S. P. Balasubrahmanyam, S. Janaki
2.	"Ottam Kanda Kuthiraikku"	S. P. Balasubrahmanyam, L. R. Eswari
3.	"En Ullam Engindra Vaanathile"	T. M. Soundararajan, P. Susheela
4.	"Mankutti Ippodhu"	T. M. Soundararajan
5.	"Poo Manakkum Poonkuzhali"	S. P. Balasubrahmanyam

== Reception ==
Kanthan of Kalki called the screenplay confusing but appreciated some of the songs.
