= Chandrakumari =

Indian Tamil-language soap opera

- Genre: Soap opera
- Written by: Radaan Media Creative Team; Dialogues by; Marudhu Shankar; Balamurali Varman
- Screenplay by: S.Kumaresan (contemporary portion); Raj Prabhu (historical portion)
- Directed by: C.J Bhaskar (1–67); O.N Rathnam (68 – 144); Suresh Krissna (historical portion)
- Creative director: Radikaa Sarathkumar
- Starring: Viji Chandrasekhar; Uma Riyaz Khan; Muktha; Venu Arvind; Devipriya
- Theme music composer: Sirpy
- Opening theme: Seivai oru vidhiyai (செய்வாய் ஒரு விதியை)
- Composer: Sirpy
- Country of origin: India
- Original language: Tamil
- No. of seasons: 1
- No. of episodes: 144

Production
- Executive producer: Suku Kochappan
- Producers: Radaan Mediaworks; Sun Entertainment
- Cinematography: Balamurugan; Shridhar; Phillips S. Vijayakumar; D.S. Vasan
- Editors: Roshan; S. Richard; V. Jayashankar
- Running time: 20–25 minutes
- Production companies: Radaan Mediaworks; Sun Entertainment

Original release
- Network: Sun TV
- Release: 10 December 2018 – 1 June 2019

Chandrakumari is an Indian Tamil-language television historical drama and soap opera, replacing the serial Vani Rani. It was directed by Suresh Krissna and O. N. Rathnam under the Sun Entertainment and Radaan Mediaworks banners. It premiered on Sun TV from 10 December 2018 to 1 June 2019 with 144 episodes. The soap opera features Viji Chandrasekhar playing the lead role while Uma Riyaz Khan, Muktha, Venu Arvind and Devipriya play pivotal roles. The sets for the shooting were established in Chennai and Mumbai. The plot of the serial is based on the ancient queen Chandrakumari and on the actual ancient historical story. The first day's episode was extended to one hour instead of a normal 28 minutes schedule and it became Sun TV, Gemini TV and Surya TV's first serial to have its opening episode for one hour. This serial portrays Radhika in a historical role.

== Plot ==
The story takes place in two periods—past and present.

The story begins on Anjali (Bhanu) who is an archaeologist. She is searching for the life history of Chandrakumari (Queen of Chandravamsam), the queen of Mangalapuri. She was involved in the excavation of present-day Mangalapuri. Once she excavates an idol of Ellaiyaman, an old man warns her and her team that the idol will bring evil to the world now that it is dug out. Once Anjali visits the forest, she finds an ancient script of Chandrakumari. After taking the script, an evil fly comes out in the overflowing blood. The evil fly later chases and attacks her. She ran to a temple in which she escapes from the fly. Later, at the office, her professor narrates the story of Chandrakumari seeing the ancient book.

In the past.....

Chandrakumari was the queen of Mangalapuri. She battles for their neighbouring kingdom Thennur. The king of Thennur sends her daughter to be taught by the queen. She meets Chandrakumari's daughter. Unfortunately, she hits the king and develops feelings in him. At the time she says about the Karpaga Lingam (made up of the ashes of Lord Vishnu, Lord Brahma, Lord Shiva, Goddess Lakshmi, Saraswati, Parvati), she was attacked by the soldiers of Pannaiyur who wanted to abduct the Lingam. But she overpowers them and surrounds the fort of Pannaiyur, insulting the evil queen of Pannaiyur, Devika (Uma Riyaz Khan). Upset about this incident, she has a flashback to her past. In the past, she was a 15-year-old princess who killed her father being misleading by her former Mathaguru who acknowledged evil supernatural powers. She vows to kill Chandrakumari.

Back to the present...

The Chandrakumari book has been burned by itself. Later she decides to move to Chennai. On the way, she was being followed by the evil fly. The Rajaguru of Manglapuri who was in the penance for these long years turns into a transgender woman and protects her. Meanwhile, in the jail, Rajaguru meets Chandra, the incarnation of queen Chandrakumari. Rajaguru brings Chandra to her house and gives her a bilva leaf. Chandra discovers that she was Queen Chandrakumari in her past birth. She returns to her house and meets her family. She was irritated when her grandfather says about the release of her mother. Meanwhile, Rajaguru also meets Neelakandan (the king) in his office. After that Devika meets Neelakandan and tells about her evil plans.

Later, Anjali's grandfather dies in an accident. On his deathbed, he reveals that her mother Chandra was not an actual criminal. Anjali and her mother then reunite. Chandra moved to her birthplace and stayed there with Anjali. On a particular day when Chandra was traveling in an auto she heard a girl shouting, as a male taxi driver is trying to rape her. She and the auto driver both immediately ran towards that girl and saved her from being raped.

This incident inspires Chandra to start a taxi for women with women drivers for their safety. She asks Anjali about this business, and Anjali readily agrees to this. Later they go to a bank and ask the manager for a loan.

Chandra's first aunt tries to marry her grandson Aadhav to Chandra's daughter Anjali. After a sequence of events, Chandra tells Anjali about her aunt and brother, and the bank loan also gets sanctioned. Mukundhan (Neelakandan's sister son), knowing this, kidnaps Anjali and Aadhav. Mukundhan and Anjali jump to a place called Shankarapuram (Chandra's poorviga veedu). Anjali is then saved by Chandra's second aunt's grandson Sathyamoorthy.

Anjali and Chandra start a business called Anjali cabs for Women's safety. But Mukundhan again comes to Anjali's house to harass her when she is alone. Anjali murders Mukundhan in self-defense. Chandra and Anjali bury Mukundhan's body so nobody knows she murdered him.

Neelakandan decides to divorce Chandra so he can marry Rudra, but Chandra does not want to divorce him. So Rudra threatens Chandra to divorce him, warning that if Chandra does not, she will send the video that shows Chandra and Anjali burying Mukundhan.

Chandra comes to see Rudra. After a discussion about divorcing, Chandra decides not to divorce. Rudra takes a gun from her bag but does not shoot Chandra, instead asking her men to beat Chandra to death and throw her into the outskirts. Anjali and her uncle Sivanesan try to find out what happened to her. In the meanwhile Rudra gets Anjali arrested by showing the video evidence to police. The case is brought to court, and Anjali admits to killing Mukundan. She justifies her act as self-defense and says that her mother has no role in this. Then comes a twist: it is shown that Mukundan is alive and Anjali has not killed him. The court releases Anjali free of murder charges.

Two men rescue Chandra and admit her in hospital. After eight days, she regains consciousness and thinks about the events that happened on the day she came to see Rudra.

== Cast ==
=== Main ===
- Radikaa Sarathkumar/Viji Chandrasekhar as Chandra Neelakantan (Neelakantan's wife and Anjali's mother) (in present)
- Muktha as Anjali Sathyamoorthy (in present)
- Arun Kumar Rajan as Sathyamoorthy alias Sathya (Anjali's husband) (in present)
- Venu Arvind as Neelakantan (Anjali's father) (in present)
- Devipriya as Rudhra (Devika's step sister and Neelakantan's fiancée) (in present)

=== Recurring ===
- Aravind Akash as RJ Aadhavan (Anjali's close friend) (in present)
- Saakshi Siva as Shivaneshan (Aadhavan and Sharanya's father) (in present)
- Latha Sethupathy as Aadhavan's grandmother (Rohini's mother) (in present)
- "Saathappan" Nandakumar as Baava (Rudhra's uncle) (in present)
- Yazhini as Seetha (Manickkam's first daughter) (in present)
- ------ as Kavitha (Manickam's second daughter) (in present)
- Geetha Narayanan as Maragadham (Sathyamoorthy's grandmother) (in present)
- Manush as Kuberan (Neelakantan's close friend) (in present)
- "Saravanan Meenatchi" Ravi Chandran as Ponnambalam (Rudra's cousin brother) (in present)

=== Former ===
- Radhika Sarathkumar as Queen Chandrakumari (Queen of Mangalapuri and Yazhini's mother) (in past) and Chandra Neelakantan (Neelakantan's wife and Anjali's mother) (in present) (Replaced by Viji Chandrasekhar)
- Arun Sagar as King Neelakantan (Queen Chandrakumari's husband and Yazhini's father) (in past) and Neelakantan (Chandra's husband and Anjali's father) (in present) (Replaced by Venu Arvind)
- Samyuktha Shanmuganathan as Princess Rudhra (in past) (Queen Devika's sister and King Neelakantan's fiancée) (in past) and Rudhra (Devika's step sister and fiancée) (in present) (Replaced by Devipriya)
- Shilpa as Raghav's mother (in present)
- Venkatraman Subramaniam as Queen Devika, Rudra and Naga's father (the Maharaja of Pannaiyur) (in past)
- ---- as Annamalai (Neelakantan, Arjun, Madhi and Valli's father, Died in serial) (in present)
- ---- as Sethupathy (Queen Chandrakumari's sidekick, Died in serial) (in past)
- Vijay Krishnaraj as Manickam (in present) [died in serial]
- Uma Riyaz Khan as Queen Devika (Queen of Panayur) (in past) and Devika (Rudhra's step sister and Neelakantan's arch rival) (in present)
- Vinod as Naaga, Devika's brother and loyal sidekick (in past and present)
- ---- as Rajaguru (in past) /
- Kaviraj Achari as Transgender Lady (in present)
- Dr. Shaji Sham as Madhi (Neelakantan's first brother) (in present)
- Veena Venkatesh as Naaga's wife (in present)
- ----- as Arjun (Neelakantan's second brother) (in present)
- Meena Vemuri as Vidhya Arjun (Arjun's wife) (in present)
- Nirosha as Valli Sridhar (Neelakantan's younger sister and Mukudan's mother) (in present)
- Yuvarani Ravindra as Rohini Shivaneshan (Aadhavan and Saranya's mother) (in present)
- ---- as Sharanya (Aadhavan's sister) (in present)
- Sasindhar Pushapalingam as Mukundan (Valli's son and Anjali's cousin) (in present)
- ------ as Sridhar (Valli's husband) (in present)

== Soundtrack ==
Track list
No.	Title	Lyrics	Length
1.	"Sayyvaai Oru Vidihyai"	Sirpy	2:19
