= Ennarukil Nee Irunthal =

- Title card
- Directed by: Sundar K. Vijayan
- Written by: Sundar K. Vijayan
- Produced by: T. Indrakumar
- Starring: Chi. Guru Dutt; Priyanka
- Cinematography: A. R. Babu
- Edited by: Shantharam R.
- Music by: Ilaiyaraaja
- Production company: Tamizh Thaai Movies
- Release date: 31 May 1991
- Country: India
- Language: Tamil

Ennarukil Nee Irunthal (transl. If you are near me) is a 1991 Indian Tamil-language film directed by Sundar K. Vijayan, starring Chi. Guru Dutt and Priyanka. It was released on 31 May 1991.

== Cast ==
- Chi. Guru Dutt
- Priyanka
- Chinni Jayanth
- Mayilsamy
- Meesai Murugesan

== Soundtrack ==
Soundtrack was composed by Ilaiyaraaja.

Song	Singers	Lyrics
"Indhira Sundhariye"	Ilaiyaraaja, S. Janaki	Na. Kamarasan
"Oh Unnala"	Uma Ramanan, Mano	Na. Kamarasan
"Oru Kanam Aagilum"	Arunmozhi	Ilaiyaraaja
"Nilave Nee Varavendum"	Ilaiyaraaja	Na. Kamarasan
" Udhayam Neeye"	S. Janaki	Na. Kamarasan
"Paadu Paatteduthu"	Uma Ramanan, Mano	Vaali

== Reception ==
Sundarji of Kalki praised the music, cinematography and humour, but panned the way the story is handled.
