= Venu Arvind =

Indian actor

- Born: 9 November 1965 (age 60)
- Occupations: Stage artist, actor, dubbing artist, director
- Years active: 1983-present
- Spouse: Shoba (m. 1987)
- Children: 2 (Veena, Vijay)

Venu Arvind is an Indian actor. He is known for his roles in television serials of K. Balachander and Kovai Anuradha. He initially gained popularity as lead hero of television serials with Costly Mappilai (1996), Green Signal (1997) both directed by Kovai Anuradha. Then K. Balachander directed him in Kadhal Pagadai (1997), Kasalavu Nesam (1999).

He played the leading antagonist Ranga in the television soap Alaigal which was super successful and his role is popular among the audiences even now.

He debuted as a director with the film Sabash Sariyaana Potti.He has been married to Shoba since 1987 and the couple have two children, a daughter, Veena and a son, Vijay. .

== Awards ==
- 2006: Received title of Kalaimamani Award by the Government of Tamil Nadu, which is the highest state honour in the field of Arts.(First TV actor to win kalaimamani award)

== Filmography ==
=== Films ===
As actor

Year	Film	Role	Notes
1983	Muthu Engal Sothu		
1984	Nyayam Ketkiren		
1985	Andha Oru Nimidam	Inspector Raju	
1985	Pagal Nilavu	Chandrasekhar	Uncredited
1985	Padikkadha Pannaiyar	Pannaiyar's son	
1998	Iniyavale		
2000	Alai Payuthey	ACP Arumugam	
2001	Ennavalle	Kumar	
2001	Narasimha		
2006	Vallavan		
2007	Naalaiya Pozhuthum Unnodu	Sakthi's uncle	
2007	Vegam		
2008	Megam		
2010	Azhukkan Azhagakiran		
2011	Sabash Sariyana Potti		also director
2021	Oh Manapenne!	Karthick's father	

As director

- Sabash Sariyana Potti (2011)

As dubbing artist

Year	Title	Actor	Language	Notes
1984	Kadamai	Arjun	Tamil	
1985	Vilangu Meen	Hariprasad	Tamil	
1990	Paadagan	Kamal Haasan	Tamil	Dubbed Version
1994	May Madham	Vineeth	Tamil	
1999	Kaadhal Vaangi Vanthen	Aravind Khathare	Tamil	Teleserial

=== Television serials ===
Television series	Year	Role
Nilapenn		
Sivamayam		Detective Pandiyan
Costly Maapilai	1996	Kalyanraman
Green Signal	1997	
Rishimoolam		
Raghuvamsam		
Kadhal Pagadai	1997	Raj Babu
Kasalavu Nesam	1999	Gautham
Alaiosai	2001–2004	
Vazhkkai	2000–2001	Prabhakar
Irandaam Chanakyan	2001-2002	Thiagarajan / Kumar
Alaigal	2001–2003	Rangarajan "Ranga/Raja"
Agnisakshi	2002	
Janani	2003	
Adugiran Kannan	2003-2005	Arvind Krishna
Sivamayam	2004–2005	Pandian
Selvi / Arasi	2005–2009	Ganesan Jayadev "GJ/Deva"
Manjal Mahimai	2007–2008	Sanjay
Vani Rani	2013–2018	Bhoominathan
Kuttiz	2018–2019	Rajeev
Chandrakumari	2019	Neelakantan
Thayamma Kudumbathaar	2024–present	Velmurugan
