= Mangamma Sabadham (1985 film) =

- Theatrical release poster
- Directed by: K. Vijayan
- Screenplay by: Aaroor Dass (dialogues)
- Based on: Kasam Paida Karne Wale Ki by Babbar Subhash
- Produced by: Suresh Balaje
- Starring: Kamal Haasan; Madhavi; Sathyaraj; Sujatha
- Cinematography: Diwary
- Edited by: D. Vasu
- Music by: Shankar–Ganesh
- Production company: Sujatha Cine Arts
- Release date: 21 September 1985
- Country: India
- Language: Tamil

Mangamma Sabadham (transl. Mangamma's vow) is a 1985 Indian Tamil-language masala film, directed by K. Vijayan and produced by K. Balaji, starring Kamal Haasan, Sujatha, Madhavi and Sathyaraj. It is a remake of the 1984 Hindi film Kasam Paida Karne Wale Ki. The film was released on 21 September 1985.

== Plot ==
Ashok is raised to be a stuttering, frightened coward by his cruel uncle Bhoopathy. When Mangamma and her cohorts learn that he is unmarried, she works her way into his mother's heart and marries him. When she learns about his ill-treatment at the hands of his uncle, his plight changes her heart and she decides to stay on. Bhoopathy reveals her initial plan of absconding with the money and drives her out. When Ashok runs to join her, Bhoopathy kills him. Mangamma is thought to be dead but she survives and raises her son Raja to be a fearless young man well-versed in fighting, dancing, etc. Once he learns the story, he, along with his girlfriend Radha, settles scores with Bhoopathy and his son Jaipal.

== Cast ==
- Kamal Haasan as Ashok and Raja
- Sujatha as Mangamma
- Madhavi as Radha
- Sathyaraj as Boopathy
- Balan K. Nair
- Sukumari
- Ramarao
- Manorama
- Nalinikanth as Jaipal
- Bindu Ghosh
- Y. Vijaya
- Manik Irani as Bayilvan
- Master Suresh

== Production ==
The song "Cola Cola" was shot at Adyar Gate Hotel, Madras using four cameras.

== Soundtrack ==
The music was composed by Shankar–Ganesh. For the Malayalam-dubbed version Randum Randum Anchu, all lyrics were written by Poovachal Khader.

Tamil tracklist
No.	Title	Lyrics	Singer(s)	Length
1.	"Cola Cola"	Vaali	Vani Jairam & Chorus	4:44
2.	"Sorgathin Vaasal"	Pulamaipithan	S. P. Balasubrahmanyam, Vani Jairam	5:53
3.	"Ootthikka Raasa"	Pulamaipithan	S. P. Balasubrahmanyam, Vani Jairam & Chorus	4:11
4.	"Thaai Sathyam"	Vaali	S. P. Balasubrahmanyam & Chorus	4:08
5.	"Adey Udambellam"	Vaali	Vani Jairam	5:20
6.	"Instrumental Tunes (Adey Udambellam)"			5:26
7.	"Instrumental Tunes (Sorgathin Vaasal)"			6:00
8.	"Cola Cola"	Vaali	Vani Jairam & Chorus	4:47
Total length:				40:29

Malayalam tracklist
No.	Title	Singer(s)	Length
1.	"Cola Cola"	Vani Jairam
2.	"Manassilore"	P. Jayachandran & Chorus
3.	"Panthalathil"	Vani Jairam
4.	"Swargathin Vaathilinnu"	K. J. Yesudas, Vani Jairam
5.	"Thumbikko"	P. Jayachandran, Vani Jairam

== Reception ==
Jayamanmadhan of Kalki appreciated the film for Haasan and Sathyaraj's performances in the first half, but the post-interval portions were like a jeep running on railway tracks.
