= Rebala =

Coordinates: 14°32′N 79°54′E

- village
- Interactive map of Rebala
- Country: India
- State: Andhra Pradesh
- District: Nellore

Government
  - Type: Panchayati raj (India)
  - Body: Gram panchayat

Population
  - Total: 2,000

Languages
  - Official: Telugu
- Time zone: UTC+5:30 (IST)
- PIN: 524305
- Nearest city: Buchireddy Palem
- Lok Sabha constituency: Nellore
- Vidhan Sabha constituency: Kovur

Rebala is a village located in the Buchireddypalem mandal of Nellore district, Andhra Pradesh, India.
