= Anantham Ajnatham =

- Directed by: K. P. Jayan
- Produced by: J. J. Abrams
- Music by: M. K. Arjunan
- Release date: 20 May 1983
- Country: India
- Language: Malayalam

Anantham Ajnatham is a 1983 Indian Malayalam film, directed by K. P. Jayan. The film has musical score by M. K. Arjunan.

== Soundtrack ==
The music was composed by M. K. Arjunan and the lyrics were written by M. N. Thankappan.

| No. | Song | Singers | Lyrics | Length (m:ss) |
|---|---|---|---|---|
| 1 | "Ananthamajnaathamalle" | K. J. Yesudas | M. N. Thankappan | |
| 2 | "Chandanappadavil" | K. J. Yesudas | M. N. Thankappan | |
| 3 | "Maraala Midhunangale" | P. Jayachandran | M. N. Thankappan | |
| 4 | "Orithal Vidarnnaal" | Vani Jairam | M. N. Thankappan | |
