= En Rathathin Rathame =

- Directed by: K. Vijayan; Sundar K. Vijayan
- Story by: Salim–Javed
- Produced by: K. Balaji
- Starring: K. Bhagyaraj; Meenakshi Seshadri
- Cinematography: Tiwari
- Edited by: Chezhiyan
- Music by: Shankar–Ganesh
- Production company: Sujatha Cine Arts
- Release date: 14 April 1989
- Country: India
- Language: Tamil

En Rathathin Rathame (transl. Oh, blood of my blood) is a 1989 Indian Tamil-language science fiction action film directed initially by K. Vijayan, and finished by his son Sundar K. Vijayan, following his father's death. The film stars K. Bhagyaraj and Bollywood actress Meenakshi Seshadri in her Tamil debut. It is a remake of the Hindi film Mr. India (1987).

== Plot ==
A group of royals are much disappointed by the amendment of democratic India, where no more kingdoms and kings shall exist. To get back the provinces and monarchy rule, all take Narendra Bhupathy, a physically challenged King and his son Ilayaraja Bhupathy as their leaders. They support anti-social elements from foreign nations for getting weapons from them to create chaos in the country.

Natesan is a poor auto-rickshaw driver who takes care of orphan children at his home. He manages to feed and educate the children with the meagre amount he earns and does not accept any help. Meenakshi is a press reporter for a magazine named Bakirangam, which has a very poor circulation. To improve its flow, the magazine's Editor insists that she interview a rapist who is capable of describing a rape point by point. Meenakshi is afraid to do the assignment, but accepts as she has no other. Natesan visits the Bakirangam office to advertise for a rental home, and he is diverted to Meenakshi's cabin. Meenakshi misunderstands him to be the rapist, and at one point, she shouts for help. Angered, Natesan explains who he is and why he has come, and Meenakshi apologises for her misunderstanding. Meenakshi asks his home for rent, but demands that no children to be present as it is a big disturbance for her work. Natesan lies to her that no children are present in the house as he needs the money. Meenakshi visits the house and gets irritated about the mess, but Natesan manages to grab the advance amount from her. Meenakshi finds there are a lot of children in the home and demands the money she gave. But Natasen says since he did not give receipt for the amount she gave as advance, she cannot claim her money back, and because of this, she stays unwillingly in that house.

Meenakshi is irritated by the children, and at one point, she punishes them for their mischief. She shouts at Natesan for the children's act and demands that no one should enter her room. All the children apologise to her for their acts, which breaks her heart. She understands that it is the nature of children to be mischievous and becomes their friend. She also understands how Natesan takes care of them despite his poor condition. Meanwhile, Natesan returns her advance amount by mortgaging his auto-rickshaw and asks her to vacate the house. But Meenakshi and the children manage to change his mind and let her stay. Except for the small fights, both Natesan and Meenakshi are attracted towards each other.

Natesan is frequently visited by an old "Mental" looking old man who demands money from Natesan most of the time. Natesan is irritated by his acts, and yet he supports him with the money. The old man is actually a scientist who has invented many things. Natesan gets angry that the old man cheated on him once, visits his home and is surprised to see all the inventions. The old man explains that he is inventing the machine which makes people invisible. He also shows him a receiver which can receive abnormal frequencies powerful enough to intrude Indian defence. Natesan hears an intrusion that a famous scientist shall be killed by some people. So he rushes to the police station to warn them. The scientist is saved because of his warning. Hence he earns the enmity of Raja Bhupathy as he is behind the master plan of killing the scientist. Bhupathy's men sets off to find the receiver in Natesan's house and find that the receiver is with the old man. The old scientist finally invents the "invisibility" machine. But he is killed by Bhupathy's men. Before dying, he hands over the machine to Natesan and tells him to fight for justice in the country with this. Natesan and one of his children test the machine and sees that it works. Hence Natesan uses the machine and becomes invisible. He once saves Meenakshi from Bhupathy's men when she tried to find their truth and got trapped. The invisible man introduces himself as "Vaathiyaar" (nickname of Thiru M.G.R.) who has come back to the world to fight for justice. Soon Natesan gains fame as invisible "Vaathiyaar" due to his good deeds for society. Since he does good things and does not trouble the public and the government, the police do not arrest him. The child, who is the only person to know about Natesan's invisibility, finds that the invisible man can be seen through red colour, and he wears red glasses. Meenakshi is very proud that she is a friend of "Vaathiyaar" and tells everybody she is his pet. This irritates Natesan and once nose-cuts her in front of everybody to teach her a lesson. Natesan's inferiority complex prevents him from proposing his love for Meenakshi, and he expresses his love to her as "Vaathiyaar", hoping that she would love the hero. But Meenakshi rejects his proposal as she reveals that she loves a poor auto driver who is a gentle man and tells Invisible Man to go out of her life. Natesan reveals his secret to her and is very happy to have won her love.

Bhupathys find that the invisible man is the auto-driver who spoiled all their plans. Hence they spoil his name by troubling people and tell people that they are allies of "Mayaavi" (magic man). Hence Maayavi now becomes a villain for the people. Bhupathy blackmails Natesan to give the invisible machine, and else all his children shall be killed. They also kill one child as he refused to hand it over. Hence the child who knows about the invisible man gives the machine to Bhupathy. Now Ilayaraja Bhupathy becomes invisible and starts to loot money from people, performs larcenies in banks and threatens all people. Narendra Bhupathy demands the rule of Tamil Nadu state under him, and else he would kill people in the number of the 1500s until the government is handed over and kills 3000 people in school and train to realise the seriousness. Fearing his acts, the governor agrees to hand over the state to him, but actually is behind the police plan to arrest Bhupathys and get back the state from their threat.

Natesan finds about everything and sets off to save the city from Bhupathy. He tells policemen about his plan and enters the place as a TV cameraman where the "Oath of Office" ceremony by senior Bhupathy take place. He uses a red filter to capture junior Bhupathy and attacks him. But he cannot withstand as the camera breaks in the chaos created by Bhupathy. Meenkashi uses a giant light used by a circus and covers with a red colour dress, and junior Bhupathy, who is invisible, is now clearly visible to everyone. Natesan manages to escape from both Bhupathys when both of them tried to kill him, instead of killing one another. In the incident, the invisibility machine breaks. Natesan concludes that any invention which can be misused against people should not be welcomed. Meenakshi and Natesan finally marry.

== Cast ==
- K. Bhagyaraj as Natesan
- Meenakshi Sheshadri as Bakirangam
- R. N. Sudarshan
- Captain Raju
- Janagaraj
- Mannangatti Subramaniam
- Ronnie Patel
- Pradeep Shakthi
- Sharat Saxena
- Prasanna Venkatachalam
- Bob Christo
- Suryakanth
- C. R. Saraswathi
- Thavakalai Chittibabu

== Production ==
The director Vijayan died during the making of the film, so his son Sundar stepped in as director and completed the remaining portions.

== Soundtrack ==
Soundtrack was composed by Shankar–Ganesh. This soundtrack was released in Telugu as Mayakrishnudu where all lyrics were written by Rajasri.

Tamil

Song	Singers	Lyrics	Length
"Vaathiyaare Chinna"	S. Janaki and chorus	Vaali	03:59
"Indha Raagamum"	Mano and K. S. Chitra	Vaali	05:21
"En Rathathin"	S. P. Balasubrahmanyam and chorus	Pulamaipithan	04:23
"Ora Ayiram" (I Love You)	S. P. Balasubrahmanyam and S. Janaki	Pulamaipithan	05:19
"En Peru Sweety"	S. Janaki and chorus	Pulamaipithan	04:14

Telugu

Song	Singers	Length
"Aha Raagala Rachilakale"	S. P. Balasubrahmanyam, Chorus	04:35
"Chinna Raja Aha Chinna Raja"	S. Janaki, Chorus	03:57
"O Kartika Pornami"	S. P. Balasubrahmanyam, S. Janaki	05:47
"Ee Ragamu Ee Thalamu"	S. P. Balasubrahmanyam, S. P. Sailaja	04:50
"Naa Pere Sweety"	S. Janaki, Chorus	03:04

== Release and reception ==
En Rathathin Rathame was released on 14 April 1989, during Puthandu. P. S. S. of Kalki praised Meenakshi Seshadri's acting but felt Bhagyaraj in a serious role playing M. G. Ramachandran's supporter was not effective while questioning the makers for using names of Ramachandran and G. D. Naidu as it looked more like mocking them rather than increasing their images and that the issue of elders in a film for children feels irritating and panned the characterisations of scientist and antagonist.
