= Sattam =

1983 film by K. Vijayan

- Theatrical release poster
- Directed by: K. Vijayan
- Story by: Salim–Javed
- Based on: Dostana (Hindi)
- Produced by: Anandavalli Balaji
- Starring: Kamal Haasan; Madhavi; Sarath Babu
- Cinematography: Dewari
- Edited by: V. Chakrapani
- Music by: Gangai Amaran
- Production company: Sujatha Cine Arts
- Release date: 21 May 1983
- Running time: 147 minutes
- Country: India
- Language: Tamil

Sattam (transl. The Law) is a 1983 Indian Tamil-language action film directed by K. Vijayan and produced by Anandavalli Balaji, starring Kamal Haasan, Sarath Babu and Madhavi in the lead roles. It is a remake of the Hindi film Dostana (1980). The film was released on 21 May 1983.

== Cast ==
- Kamal Haasan as Raja
- Madhavi as Radha
- Sarath Babu as Ravi
- Y. G. Mahendran as M.L.Anandharaman
- Jaishankar as Ramesh
- Vijayakumar as Michael Johny
- K. Balaji as Toni
- Manorama as Pandanur Chandirabana
- Ilavarasi
- Sathyakala
- Silk Smitha

== Soundtrack ==
The music was composed by Gangai Amaran.

Track listing
| No. | Title | Lyrics | Singer(s) | Length |
|---|---|---|---|---|
| 1. | "Vaa Vaa En Veenaiyae" | Vaali | S. P. Balasubrahmanyam, Vani Jairam | 3:29 |
| 2. | "Ammamma Saranam" | Vaali | S. P. Balasubrahmanyam, Vani Jairam | 4:17 |
| 3. | "Oru Nanbanin" | Vaali | S. P. Balasubrahmanyam | 4:15 |
| 4. | "Thekam Pattu" | Gangai Amaran | S. P. Balasubrahmanyam, S. P. Sailaja | 5:40 |
| 5. | "Nanbane Enathu Uyir" | Vaali | S. P. Balasubrahmanyam, Malaysia Vasudevan | 7:34 |
| Total length: | | | | 25:15 |

== Reception ==
Jayamanmadhan of Kalki praised the acting of Kamal Haasan, Madhavi and Sarath Babu but felt the antagonists Jaishankar, Vijayakumar were underutilised and concluded calling the first half is hand rickshaw and second half is SLV.
