= Velicham =

- Title card
- Directed by: Sundar K. Vijayan
- Written by: Sundar K. Vijayan
- Produced by: M. Eshwaran
- Starring: Karthik; Ranjini
- Cinematography: Gajendramani
- Edited by: L. Kesavan
- Music by: Manoj–Gyan
- Production company: L. V. Creations
- Release date: 14 January 1987
- Running time: 124 minutes
- Country: India
- Language: Tamil

Velicham (transl. Light) is a 1987 Indian Tamil-language film written and directed by Sundar K. Vijayan, starring Karthik and Ranjini. It was released on 14 January 1987. According to Sundar, the film did okay business at the box-office.

== Cast ==
- Karthik as Ashok Kumar
- Ranjini
- Nizhalgal Ravi
- Vinu Chakravarthy
- Senthil
- Kovai Sarala
- Sumithra
- Thyagu
- Chinni Jayanth
- Kumarimuthu
- Vijay Ganesh as Student

== Soundtrack ==
The soundtrack was composed by Manoj–Gyan. The song "Thulli Thulli Odum" became popular.

Track listing
No.	Title	Lyrics	Singer(s)	Length
1.	"Thulli Thulli Odum Penne"	Vairamuthu	K. J. Yesudas
2.	"Manmadha Rojave"	Pulamaipithan	S. P. Balasubrahmanyam, S. P. Sailaja
3.	"Podu Sakka Podu"	Vaali	Deepan Chakravarthy, S. Janaki
4.	"Oh My Dear"	Muthulingam	P. Jayachandran, Vani Jairam, Dr. Kalyanam
5.	"Santhosha Raagangal"	Gangai Amaran	Malaysia Vasudevan, Ramani
