= M. S. Guhan =

Indian film producer

M. S. Guhan is an Indian film producer. He has been involved in hits, such as Sivaji: The Boss, Thirupathi, Minsara Kanavu, Leader (2010 film), and recently Ayan. He is the son of the late noted producer M. Saravanan, who own the AVM Studios in Chennai. His grandfather was the founder of AVM, AVichi Meiyappan. Guhan has two twin daughters.

== Filmography ==
Year	Title	Cast	Director	Music composer	Language	Notes
2014	Idhuvum Kadandhu Pogum	Shivaji Dev, Anusha Varma	Anil Krishnan Srihari Prabhakaran		Tamil	
2011	Mudhal Idam	Vidharth, Kavitha Nair	R. Kumaran		Tamil	
2010	Leader	Rana Daggubati, Richa Gangopadhyay, Priya Anand	Sekhar Kammula		Telugu	
2009	Evaraina Epudaina	Varun Sandesh, Vimala Raman	Marthand K. Shankar		Telugu	
2009	Vettaikaaran	Vijay, Anushka Shetty	Babu Sivan		Tamil	
2009	Ayan	Suriya, Tamannaah, Prabhu	K. V. Anand		Tamil	
2009	A Aa E Ee	Navdeep, Aravind Akash, Monica, Saranya Mohan	D. Sabapathy		Tamil	
2007	Sivaji	Rajinikanth, Shriya	Shankar		Tamil	
2006	Thirupathi	Ajith Kumar, Sadha	Perarasu		Tamil	
2004	Perazhagan	Suriya, Jyothika	Sasi Shanker		Tamil	
2003	Priyamaana Thozhi	R. Madhavan, Jyothika, Sridevi Vijaykumar	Vikraman		Tamil	
2003	Anbe Anbe	Shaam, Sharmili	Mani Bharathy		Tamil	
2002	Gemini	Venkatesh, Namitha	Saran		Telugu	Remake of Tamil Film 'Gemini'
2002	Gemini	Vikram, Kiran	Saran		Tamil	
1997	Minsara Kanavu	Arvind Swamy, Prabhu Deva, Kajol	Rajiv Menon		Tamil	50th anniversary Film, Re-shot in Hindi as Sapnay
1994	Sakthivel	Selva, Kanaka	K. S. Ravikumar		Tamil	
1994	Sethupathi IPS	Vijayakanth, Meena	P. Vasu		Tamil	
1993	Ejamaan	Rajinikanth, Meena, Aishwarya	R. V. Udayakumar		Tamil	
1992	Aa Okkati Adakku	Rajendra Prasad, Rambha	E. V. V. Satyanarayana		Telugu	
1991	Paattondru Ketten	Rahman, Sithara, Nizhalgal Ravi	V. C. Guhanathan		Tamil	
1991	Maanagara Kaaval	Vijayakanth, Suman Ranganathan	M. Thyagarajan		Tamil	
1990	Thyagu	Raghuvaran, Rekha, Devi Lalitha	S. P. Muthuraman		Tamil	
1990	Ulagam Pirandhadhu Enakkaga	Sathyaraj, Gautami, Rupini	S. P. Muthuraman		Tamil	
1989	Pennbuthi Pin Buthi	Ramki, Gautami	Senthilnathan		Tamil	
1989	Raja Chinna Roja	Rajinikanth, Gautami, Baby Shalini	S. P. Muthuraman		Tamil	
1989	Sonthakkaran	Arjun, Nirosha	L. Raja		Tamil	
1989	Bamma Maata Bangaru Baata	P. Bhanumathi, Rajendra Prasad, Gautami, Nutan Prasad	Rajasekhar		Telugu	Remake of Tamil Film 'Patti Sollai Thatadhe'
1988	Vasanthi	Mohan, Madhuri	R. G. Gopu		Tamil	
1988	Paatti Sollai Thattathe	Pandiarajan, Urvashi, Manorama, S. S. Chandran	Rajasekhar		Tamil	
1988	Thaimel Aanai	Arjun, B. Saroja Devi, Ranjini, Raghuvaran, Madhuri	L. Raja		Tamil	
1987	Manithan	Rajinikanth, Rupini, Srividya	S. P. Muthuraman		Tamil	
1987	Per Sollum Pillai	Kamal Haasan, Radhika, K. R. Vijaya	S. P. Muthuraman		Tamil	
1987	Anbulla Appa	Sivaji Ganesan, Nadhiya, Rahman	A. C. Tirulokchandar		Tamil	
1987	Shankar Guru	Arjun, Seetha, Baby Shalini	L. Raja		Tamil	
1987	Samsaram Oka Chadarangam	G. Maruthi Rao, Sarath Babu, Suhasini	S. P. Muthuraman		Telugu	Remake of Tamil Film 'Samsaram Adhu Minsaram'
1986	Dharma Devathai	Vijayakanth, Radhika, Pallavi	S. P. Muthuraman		Tamil	
1986	Mella Thirandhathu Kadhavu	Mohan, Radha, Amala	R. Sundarrajan		Tamil	
1986	Samsaram Adhu Minsaram	Visu, Lakshmi, Raghuvaran	Visu		Tamil	
1986	Mr. Bharath	Rajinikanth, Ambika, Sathyaraj	S. P. Muthuraman		Tamil	
1985	Siksha	Chandra Mohan, Sarath Babu, Suhasini, Rajani	Narasimha Rao		Telugu	
1985	Uyarndha Ullam	Kamal Haasan, Ambika	S. P. Muthuraman		Tamil	
1985	Nalla Thambi	Karthik, Radha	S. P. Muthuraman		Tamil	
1984	Nallavanuku Nallavan	Rajinikanth, Radhika, Karthik, Tulasi	S. P. Muthuraman		Tamil	
1984	Naagu	Chiranjeevi, Radha	Tatineni Prasad		Telugu	
1984	Vellai Pura Ondru	Vijayakanth, Suresh, Nalini, Oorvasi	Gangai Amaran		Tamil	
1984	Pudhumai Penn	Pandiya, Revathi, Prathap Pothan	Bharathiraja		Tamil	
1983	Thoongathey Thambi Thoongathey	Kamal Haasan, Radha, Sulakshana	S. P. Muthuraman		Tamil	
1983	Moodu Mullu	Chandra Mohan, Radhika, Geetha	Jandhyala		Telugu	Remake of Tamil Film 'Mundhanai Mudichu'
1983	Mundhanai Mudichu	K. Bhagyaraj, Urvashi, Deepa	K. Bhagyaraj		Tamil	
1983	Paayum Puli	Rajinikanth, Radha	S. P. Muthuraman		Tamil	
1982	Sakalakala Vallavan	Kamal Haasan, Ambika	S. P. Muthuraman		Tamil	
1982	Amma	Prathap Pothan, Saritha	Rajasekhar		Tamil	
1982	Pokkiri Raja	Rajinikanth, Sridevi, Radhika	S. P. Muthuraman		Tamil	
1981	Jeene Ki Arzoo	Mithun Chakraborty, Rakesh Roshan, Rati Agnihotri	Rajasekhar		Hindi	Remake of Telugu Film 'Punnami Naagu'
1981	Sivappu Malli	Vijayakanth, Chandrasekhar, Shanthi Krishna, Aruna	Rama Narayanan		Tamil	
1980	Murattu Kalai	Rajinikanth, Rathi, Sumalatha	S. P. Muthuraman		Tamil	First Film with Rajinikanth
1980	Punnami Naagu	Narasimharaju, Chiranjeevi, Rathi	Rajasekhar		Telugu	
1976	Jeevan Jyoti	Vijay Arora, Bindiya Goswami	Murugan Kumaran		Hindi	
1975	Pooja	Ramakrishna, Vanisri, Manjula	Murugan Kumaran		Telugu	
1974	Nomu	Ramakrishna, Chandrakala	Pattu		Telugu	
1974	Bhakta Prahlada	S. V. Ranga Rao, Anjali Devi, Roja Ramani, M. Balamuralikrishna	Chitrapu Narayana Rao		Kannada	Dubbed from Telugu Film 'Bhakta Prahlada'
1973	Puttinillu Mettinillu	Sobhan Babu, Krishna, Chandrakala, Lakshmi	Pattu		Telugu	
1973	Jaise Ko Taisa	Jeetendra, Reena Roy, Srividya	Murugan Kumaran		Hindi	
1972	Akka Thamudu	A. V. M. Rajan, Jayalalithaa, Master Sekhar	Krishnan–Panju		Telugu	Remake of Tamil Film 'Anathai Ananthan'
1972	Kasethan Kadavulada	R. Muthuraman, Lakshmi, Thengai Srinivasan	R. G. Gopu		Tamil	
1971	Babu	Sivaji Ganesan, Sowcar Janaki, Vijayasree, Vennira Aadai Nirmala, Sivakumar	A. C. Tirulokchandar		Tamil	
1971	Bomma Borusa	Chandra Mohan, S. Varalakshmi, Chalam, Vennira Aadai Nirmala	K.Balachander		Telugu	
1971	Sudarum Sooravaliyum	Gemini Ganesan, R. Muthuraman, Nirmala	S. R. Puttanna		Tamil	
1971	Main Sunder Hoon	Mehmood, Biswajeet, Leena Chandavarkar	Krishnan–Panju		Hindi	Remake of Tamil Film 'Server Sundaram'
