= AVM Productions =

Indian motion picture company

- Type: Limited
- Industry: Film, television
- Founded: 1945; 81 years ago
- Founder: A. V. Meiyappan
- Headquarters: Vadapalani, Chennai, Tamil Nadu, India
- Area served: South India
- Products: Motion pictures, television programs
- Total assets: US$1000 million
- Website: www.avm.in

AVM Productions is an Indian film production studio founded by A. V. Meiyappan. It is the oldest film studio in India. The filming studios are located in Vadapalani, Chennai. It has produced over 300 films in Tamil, Telugu, Kannada, Malayalam and Hindi cinema. AVM has introduced numerous actors in Southern industries, some of the prominent ones being Sivaji Ganesan, Dr. Rajkumar, S. S. Rajendran, Vyjayanthimala, and Kamal Haasan and. The AVM Studios besides the shooting floors, has recording, dubbing and a preview theatre. The complex houses facilities for production and post production processing.

The studio complex also features a 36-ground heritage villa and garden property, which originally served as the residential home of the studio's founder, A.V. Meiyappan. Built in 1965, the heritage house has served as a filming location for numerous prominent films and television serials, including Aboorva Ragangal (1975), Annamalai (1992), and Padayappa (1999). In 2018, the residential premises were restored and repurposed into a commercial event space known as AVM Gardens.

== Early history ==
Born on 28 July 1907, Avichi Meiyappan hailed from a Nattukottai Nagarathar family of Karaikudi in Tamil Nadu. Avichi Chettiar ran a mini-department store, named AV & Sons. It sold gramophone records. Meiyappan, who joined his father's shop as a teenager, and decided to produce gramophone records instead of just selling them. He came to Madras where, along with friends K. S. Narayana Iyengar, Subbaiah Chettiar and others promoted Saraswathi Stores.

=== Maiden venture ===
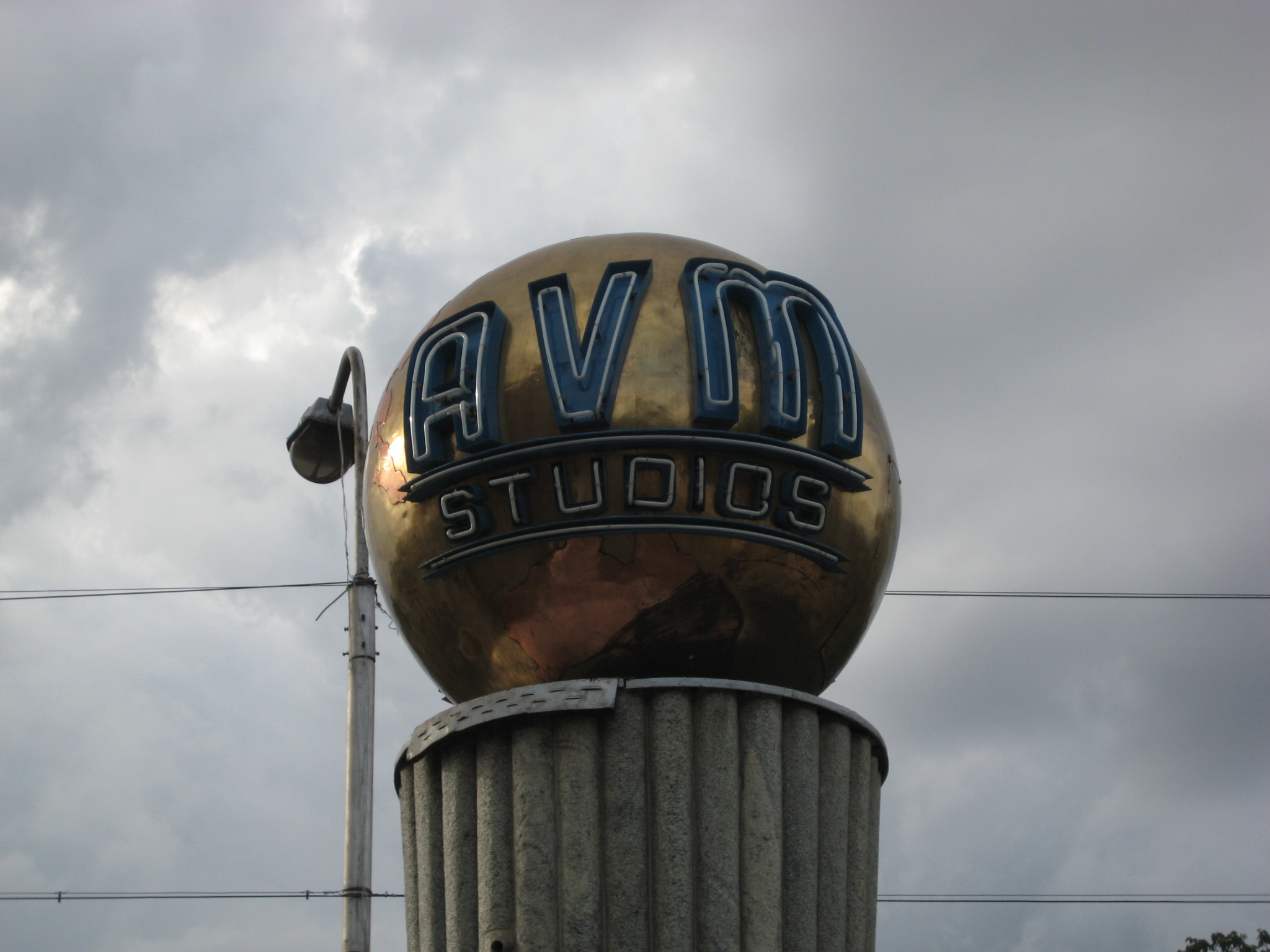
Globe at the AVM Studios in Chennai

The dawn of the talkie era (1931) inspired Meiyappan to start Saraswathi Sound Productions and he launched his maiden film venture, Alli Arjuna a Hindu mythology based film. The film was shot in Calcutta and proved a total flop as the one that followed named Ratnavali. At this point, an aspiring amateur actor and college graduate A. T. Krishnaswamy joined the unit as assistant director who was associated with Meiyappan for nearly a decade and wrote and directed the early AVM productions.

The reverses forced Meiyappan to lie low but only for a while. In association with Jayanthilal, a cinema house owner based in Bangalore, he promoted a new company Pragati Pictures Limited. Grabbing an opportunity that came his way, AVM made Nandakumar, Tamil version of a Marathi film launching it as a Pragati production. The highlight of this film was the debut of T. R. Mahalingam in to Tamil film Industry.

The film was a landmark because for the first time playback singing was tried, with Lalitha Venkatraman singing for the actor who played Devaki. Meiyappan took the sprawling Club House off Mount Road on lease and shot scenes without going to studios and erecting sets. Soon after he shifted his unit to another sprawling edifice known as Admiralty House in Adyar.

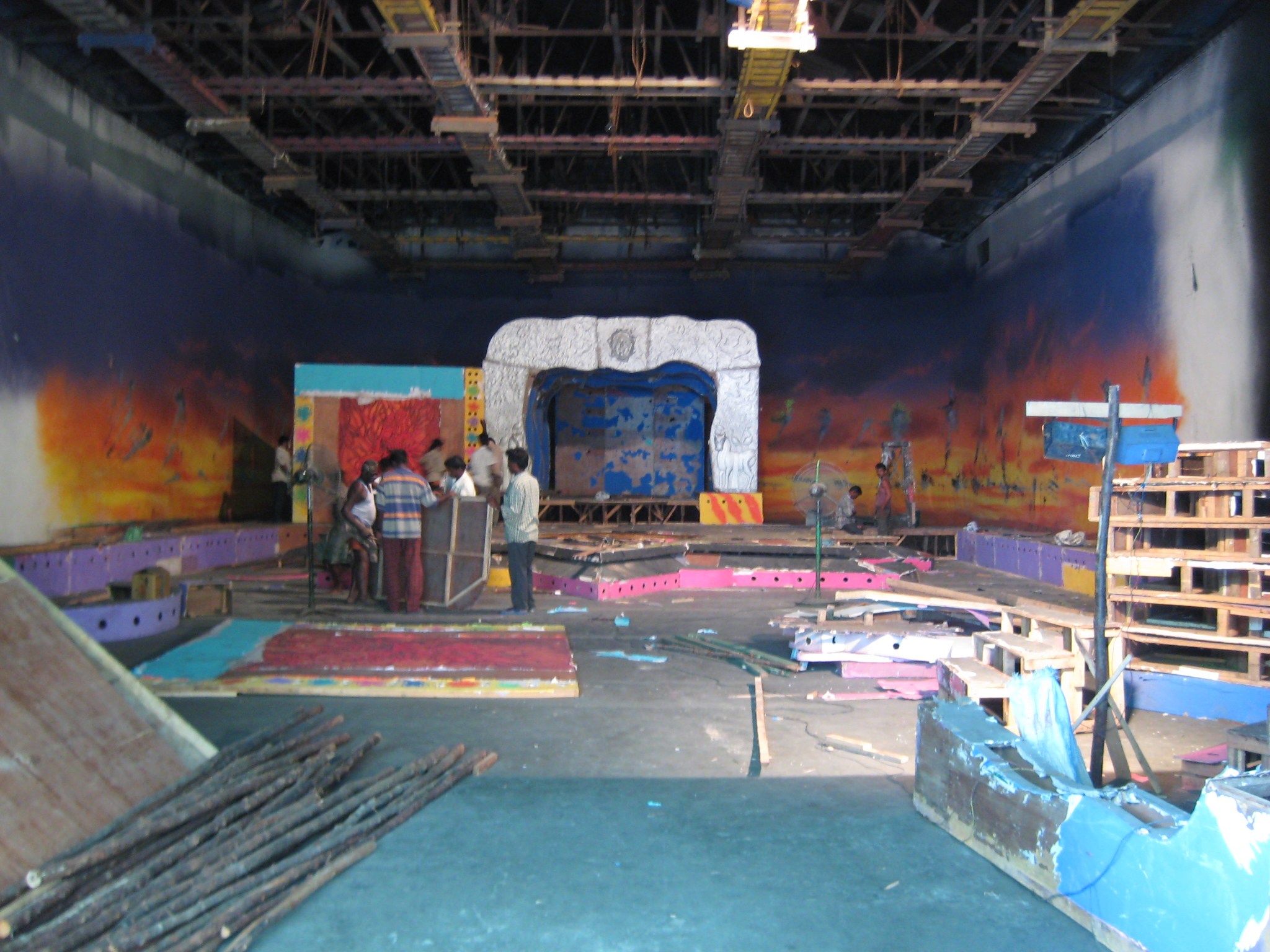
Creating a set in AVM Studio, Chennai

=== Later history ===
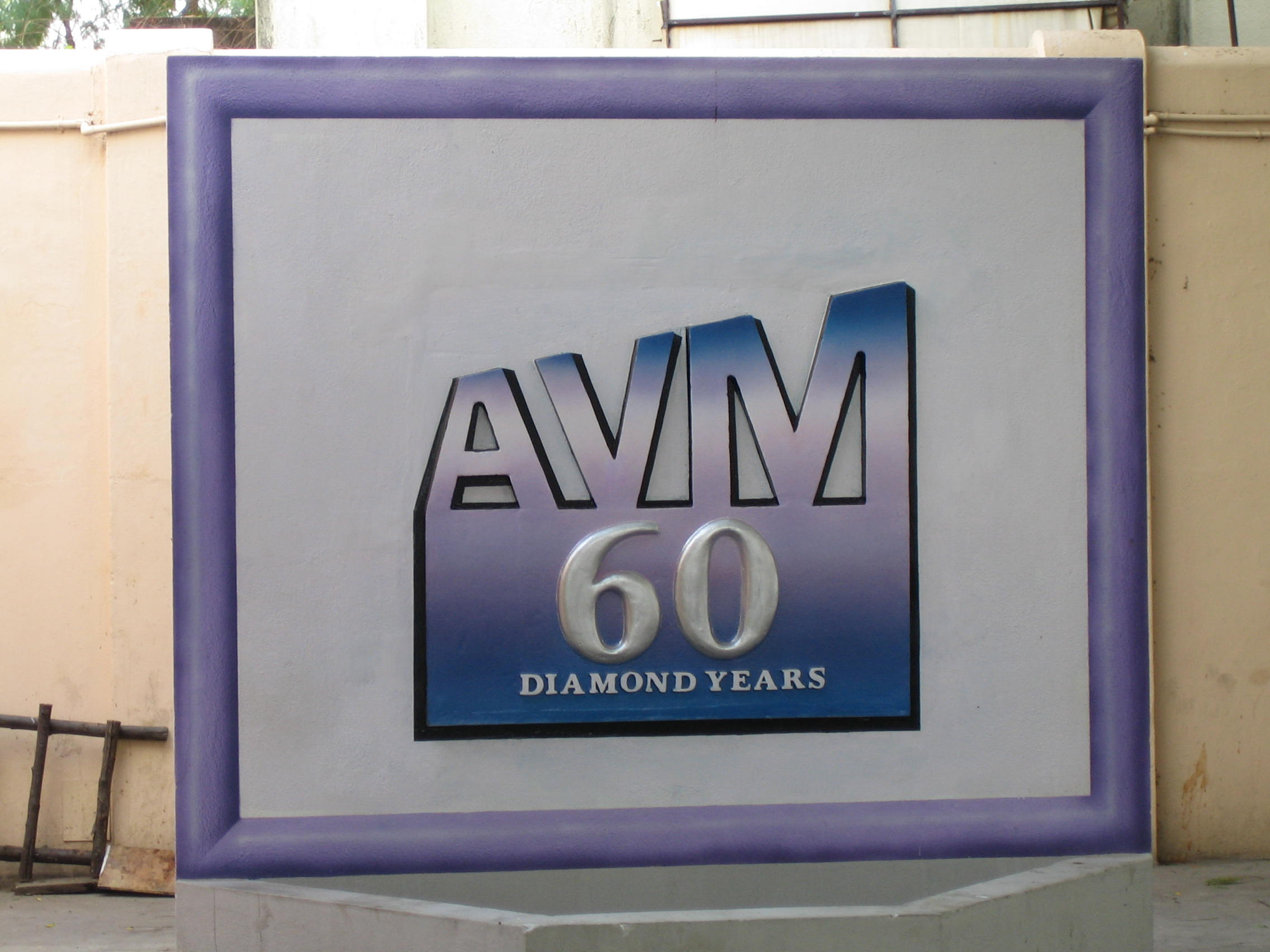
Diamond Jubilee year of AVM Productions

In 1940, Meiyappan produced Bhoo Kailas, a Telugu mythological film which created history. Its lead players were from Telugu and Kannada cinema, and was directed by Sundar Rao Nadkarni, a Mangalorean who had his training in Bombay. The film turned out to be a big hit and also won critical acclaim. Meiyappan struck gold with comedy next. Sabapathy (1941) with the saucer-eyed T. R. Ramachandran in the lead, along with Kali N. Rathnam and K. Sarangapani was a runaway success. Then came a series of hits like En Manaivi, Harishchandra (1943), Sri Valli.

The city of Madras began to feel the strains of the World War II raging on elsewhere and to reduce the exposure from Japanese bombing, Meiyappan moved his facilities to Karaikudi. In the outskirts of the town karaikudi he occupied a drama auditorium with a large open area around it on long lease and erected a studio. Thus was born AVM Productions with AVM Studios.

Hits like Nam Iruvar (1947), Parasakthi (1952), Andha Naal (1954), and the National Award-winning Hum Panchhi Ek Daal Ke (1957) followed.

Meiyappan died on 12 August 1979, and after his demise his sons took over the mantle.

In 2007, AVM produced Sivaji which at ₹ 95 crore, was said to be the most expensive film ever made in the history of the Indian film industry at that time.

In 2013, AVM led by Aruna Guhan and Aparna Guhan started producing films to be screened only on the net. Their first such production was a 55-minute-film, titled Idhuvum Kadandhu Pogum.

AVM Productions ventured into streaming space by announcing Tamil Rockerz, a crime thriller series inspired from a real-life film piracy group, directed by Arivazhagan.

== Filmography ==
=== Films ===
Year	Title (Note: Films are listed in the order of their release date.)	Cast	Director	Music composer	Language	Notes
2014	Idhuvum Kadandhu Pogum	Shivaji Dev, Anusha Varma	Anil Krishnan; Srihari Prabhakaran		Tamil	
2011	Mudhal Idam	Vidharth, Kavitha Nair	R. Kumaran		Tamil	175th Film
2010	Leader	Rana Daggubati, Richa Gangopadhyay, Priya Anand	Sekhar Kammula		Telugu	
2009	Evaraina Epudaina	Varun Sandesh, Vimala Raman	Marthand K. Shankar		Telugu	
2009	Vettaikaaran	Vijay, Anushka Shetty	Babu Sivan		Tamil	
2009	Ayan	Suriya, Tamannaah, Prabhu	K. V. Anand		Tamil	
2009	A Aa E Ee	Navdeep, Aravind Akash, Monica, Saranya Mohan	D. Sabapathy		Tamil	
2007	Sivaji	Rajinikanth, Shriya	Shankar		Tamil	
2006	Thirupathi	Ajith Kumar, Sadha	Perarasu		Tamil	
2004	Perazhagan	Suriya, Jyothika	Sasi Shanker		Tamil	
2003	Priyamaana Thozhi	R. Madhavan, Jyothika, Sridevi Vijaykumar	Vikraman		Tamil	
2003	Anbe Anbe	Shaam, Sharmili	Mani Bharathy		Tamil	
2002	Gemeni	Venkatesh, Namitha	Saran		Telugu	Remake of Tamil Film 'Gemini'
2002	Gemini	Vikram, Kiran	Saran	Bharadwaj (composer)	Tamil	
1997	Minsara Kanavu	Arvind Swamy, Prabhu Deva, Kajol	Rajiv Menon	A. R. Rahman	Tamil	50th anniversary Film, Re-shot in Hindi as Sapnay
1994	Sakthivel	Selva, Kanaka	K. S. Ravikumar	Ilaiyaraaja	Tamil	
1994	Sethupathi IPS	Vijayakanth, Meena	P. Vasu	Ilaiyaraaja	Tamil	
1993	Ejamaan	Rajinikanth, Meena, Aishwarya	R. V. Udayakumar	Ilaiyaraaja	Tamil	
1992	Aa Okkati Adakku	Rajendra Prasad, Rambha	E. V. V. Satyanarayana	Ilaiyaraaja	Telugu	
1991	Paattondru Ketten	Rahman, Sithara, Nizhalgal Ravi	V. C. Guhanathan	Maragathamani	Tamil	
1991	Maanagara Kaaval	Vijayakanth, Suman Ranganathan	M. Thyagarajan	Chandrabose	Tamil	150th Film
1990	Thyagu	Raghuvaran, Rekha, Devi Lalitha	S. P. Muthuraman	Shankar–Ganesh	Tamil	
1990	Ulagam Pirandhadhu Enakkaga	Sathyaraj, Gautami, Rupini	S. P. Muthuraman		Tamil	
1989	Pennbuthi Pin Buthi	Ramki, Gautami	Senthilnathan	Chandrabose (composer)	Tamil	
1989	Raja Chinna Roja	Rajinikanth, Gautami, Baby Shalini	S. P. Muthuraman	Chandrabose (composer)	Tamil	
1989	Sonthakkaran	Arjun, Nirosha	L. Raja	Chandrabose (composer)	Tamil	
1989	Bamma Maata Bangaru Baata	P. Bhanumathi, Rajendra Prasad, Gautami, Nutan Prasad	Rajasekhar	Chandrabose (composer)	Telugu	Remake of Tamil Film 'Patti Sollai Thatadhe'
1988	Vasanthi	Mohan, Madhuri	R. G. Gopu	Chandrabose (composer)	Tamil	
1988	Paatti Sollai Thattathe	Pandiarajan, Urvashi, Manorama, S. S. Chandran	Rajasekhar	Chandrabose (composer)	Tamil	
1988	Thaimel Aanai	Arjun, B. Saroja Devi, Ranjini, Raghuvaran, Madhuri	L. Raja	Chandrabose (composer)	Tamil	
1987	Manithan	Rajinikanth, Rupini, Srividya	S. P. Muthuraman	Chandrabose (composer)	Tamil	
1987	Per Sollum Pillai	Kamal Haasan, Radhika, K. R. Vijaya	S. P. Muthuraman	Ilaiyaraaja	Tamil	
1987	Anbulla Appa	Sivaji Ganesan, Nadhiya, Rahman	A. C. Tirulokchandar	Shankar–Ganesh	Tamil	
1987	Shankar Guru	Arjun, Seetha, Baby Shalini	L. Raja	Chandrabose (composer)	Tamil	
1987	Samsaram Oka Chadarangam	G. Maruthi Rao, Sarath Babu, Suhasini	S. P. Muthuraman	K. Chakravarthy	Telugu	Remake of Tamil Film 'Samsaram Adhu Minsaram'
1986	Dharma Devathai	Vijayakanth, Radhika, Pallavi	S. P. Muthuraman	Raveendran	Tamil	
1986	Mella Thirandhathu Kadhavu	Mohan, Radha, Amala	R. Sundarrajan	M. S. Viswanathan, Ilaiyaraaja (1 Song & BGM)	Tamil	
1986	Bandham	Shoban Babu, Baby Shalini, Raadhika Sarathkumar	Rajachandra	K. Chakravarthy	Telugu	
1986	Samsaram Adhu Minsaram	Visu, Lakshmi, Raghuvaran	Visu	Shankar–Ganesh	Tamil	
1986	Naga Devatha	Arjun Sarja, Vijayshanthi	Rama Narayanan	Chakravarthy	Telugu	
1986	Mr. Bharath	Rajinikanth, Ambika, Sathyaraj	S. P. Muthuraman	Ilaiyaraaja	Tamil	
1985	Siksha	Suhasini, Sarath Babu, Chandra Mohan, Rajani	Narasimha Rao	Ilaiyaraaja	Telugu	
1985	Uyarndha Ullam	Kamal Haasan, Ambika	S. P. Muthuraman	Ilaiyaraaja	Tamil	
1985	Nalla Thambi	Karthik, Radha	S. P. Muthuraman	Ilaiyaraaja	Tamil	
1984	Nallavanuku Nallavan	Rajinikanth, Radhika, Karthik, Tulasi	S. P. Muthuraman	Ilaiyaraaja	Tamil	
1984	Naagu	Chiranjeevi, Radha	Tatineni Prasad	Ilaiyaraaja	Telugu	
1984	Vellai Pura Ondru	Vijayakanth, Suresh, Nalini, Urvashi	Gangai Amaran	Ilaiyaraaja	Tamil	
1984	Pudhumai Penn	Pandiyan, Revathi, Prathap Pothan	Bharathiraja	Ilaiyaraaja	Tamil	
1983	Thoongathey Thambi Thoongathey	Kamal Haasan, Radha, Sulakshana	S. P. Muthuraman	Ilaiyaraaja	Tamil	
1983	Moodu Mullu	Chandra Mohan, Radhika, Geetha	Jandhyala	Rajan–Nagendra	Telugu	Remake of Tamil Film 'Mundhanai Mudichu'
1983	Mundhanai Mudichu	K. Bhagyaraj, Urvashi, Deepa	K. Bhagyaraj	Ilaiyaraaja	Tamil	
1983	Paayum Puli	Rajinikanth, Radha	S. P. Muthuraman	Ilaiyaraaja	Tamil	
1982	Sakalakala Vallavan	Kamal Haasan, Ambika	S. P. Muthuraman	Ilaiyaraaja	Tamil	125th Film
1982	Amma	Prathap Pothan, Saritha	Rajasekhar		Tamil	
1982	Pokkiri Raja	Rajinikanth, Sridevi, Radhika	S. P. Muthuraman	M. S. Viswanathan	Tamil	
1981	Jeene Ki Arzoo	Mithun Chakraborty, Rakesh Roshan, Rati Agnihotri	Rajasekhar		Hindi	Remake of Telugu Film 'Punnami Naagu'
1981	Sivappu Malli	Vijayakanth, Chandrasekhar, Shanthi Krishna, Aruna	Rama Narayanan	Shankar–Ganesh	Tamil	
1980	Murattu Kaalai	Rajinikanth, Rathi, Sumalatha	S. P. Muthuraman	Ilaiyaraaja	Tamil	First Film with Rajinikanth
1980	Punnami Naagu	Narasimharaju, Chiranjeevi, Rathi	Rajasekhar		Telugu	
1976	Jeevan Jyoti	Vijay Arora, Bindiya Goswami	Murugan Kumaran		Hindi	
1975	Pooja	Rama Krishna, Vanisri, Manjula	Murugan Kumaran		Telugu	
1974	Nomu	Rama Krishna, Chandrakala	Pattu		Telugu	
1973	Puttinillu Mettinillu	Sobhan Babu, Krishna, Chandrakala, Lakshmi	Pattu		Telugu	
1973	Jaise Ko Taisa	Jeetendra, Reena Roy, Srividya	Murugan Kumaran		Hindi	
1972	Akka Thamudu	A. V. M. Rajan, Jayalalithaa, Master Sekhar	Krishnan–Panju		Telugu	Remake of Tamil Film 'Anathai Ananthan'
1972	Kasethan Kadavulada	R. Muthuraman, Lakshmi, Thengai Srinivasan	R. G. Gopu	M. S. Viswanathan	Tamil	
1971	Babu	Sivaji Ganesan, Sowcar Janaki, Vijayasree, Vennira Aadai Nirmala, Sivakumar	A. C. Tirulokchandar	M. S. Viswanathan	Tamil	
1971	Bomma Borusa	Chandra Mohan, S. Varalakshmi, Chalam, Vennira Aadai Nirmala	K.Balachander	R. Govardhanam	Telugu	
1971	Sudarum Sooravaliyum	Gemini Ganesan, R. Muthuraman, Nirmala	S. R. Puttanna	M. S. Viswanathan	Tamil	
1971	Main Sunder Hoon	Mehmood, Biswajeet, Leena Chandavarkar	Krishnan–Panju		Hindi	Remake of Tamil Film 'Server Sundaram'
1970	Anadhai Anandhan	A. V. M. Rajan, Jayalalithaa, Master Sekhar	Krishnan–Panju	K. V. Mahadevan	Tamil	
1970	Chitti Chellelu	N. T. Rama Rao, Vanisri, Rajasree	M. Krishnan Nair		Tamil	
1970	Enga Mama	Sivaji Ganesan, Jayalalithaa	A. C. Tirulokchandar	M. S. Viswanathan	Tamil	
1969	Annaiyum Pithavum	A. V. M. Rajan, Vanisri	Krishnan–Panju	M. S. Viswanathan	Tamil	
1969	Mooga Nomu	Akkineni Nageswara Rao, Jamuna	D. Yoganand	R. Govardhanam	Telugu	
1968	Uyarndha Manidhan	Sivaji Ganesan, Sowcar Janaki, Vanisri, Sivakumar, Bharathi	Krishnan–Panju	M. S. Viswanathan	Tamil	
1968	Ramu	N. T. Rama Rao, Jamuna, Master Rajkumar	A. C. Tirulokchandar	M. S. Viswanathan	Telugu	Remake of Tamil Film 'Ramu'
1968	Do Kaliyan	Biswajeet, Mala Sinha, Mehmood, Om Prakash	Krishnan–Panju		Hindi	Remake of Tamil Film 'Kuzhandaiyum Deivamum'
1967	Ave Kallu	Krishna, Kanchana	A. C. Tirulokchandar		Telugu	Remake of Tamil Film 'Adhey Kangal'
1967	Adhey Kangal	Ravichandran, Kanchana	A. C. Tirulokchandar	Vedha (composer)	Tamil	100th Film
1967	Mehrban	Ashok Kumar, Sunil Dutt, Nutan	A. Bhimsingh		Hindi	
1967	Bhakta Prahlada	S. V. Ranga Rao, Anjali Devi, Roja Ramani, M. Balamuralikrishna	Chitrapu Narayana Rao		Telugu	
1966	Major Chandrakanth	Nagesh, Jayalalithaa, Major Sundarrajan	K. Balachandar	V. Kumar	Tamil	
1966	Leta Manasulu	Haranath, Jamuna, Kutty Padmini	Krishnan–Panju	M. S. Viswanathan	Telugu	Remake of Tamil Film 'Kuzhandaiyum Deivamum'
1966	Ramu	Gemini Ganesan, K. R. Vijaya, Master Rajkumar	A. C. Tirulokchandar	M. S. Viswanathan	Tamil	
1966	Laadla	Balraj Sahni, Nirupa Roy, Pandari Bai	Krishnan–Panju		Hindi	Remake of Tamil Film 'Annai'
1966	Anbe Vaa	M. G. Ramachandran, B. Saroja Devi	A. C. Tirulokchandar	M. S. Viswanathan	Tamil	Only Film with M. G. R.
1965	Kuzhandaiyum Deivamum	Jaishankar, Jamuna, Kutty Padmini	Krishnan–Panju	M. S. Viswanathan	Tamil	
1965	Naadi Aada Janme	N. T. Rama Rao, S. V. Ranga Rao, Savitri	A. C. Tirulokchandar		Telugu	Remake of Tamil Film 'Naanum Oru Penn'
1965	Kakkum Karangal	S. S. Rajendran, C. R. Vijayakumari, S. V. Ranga Rao, Sivakumar	A. C. Tirulokchandar	K. V. Mahadevan	Tamil	Debut Film for Sivakumar
1964	Server Sundaram	Nagesh, R. Muthuraman, K. R. Vijaya	Krishnan–Panju	M. S. Viswanathan	Tamil	75th Film
1964	Main Bhi Ladki Hoon	Dharmendra, Meena Kumari, Balraj Sahni, Om Prakash	A. C. Tirulokchandar		Hindi	Remake of Tamil Film 'Naanum Oru Penn'
1964	Pooja Ke Phool	Ashok Kumar, Dharmendra, Mala Sinha	A. Bhimsingh	Madan Mohan (composer)	Hindi	
1964	Pachai Vilakku	Sivaji Ganesan, S. S. Rajendran, Sowcar Janaki, C. R. Vijayakumari	A. Bhimsingh	M. S. Viswanathan	Tamil	
1963	Naanum Oru Penn	S. S. Rajendran, S. V. Ranga Rao, C. R. Vijayakumari	A. C. Tirulokchandar	R. Sudarsanam	Tamil	
1962	Annai	P. Bhanumathi, S. V. Ranga Rao, Sowcar Janaki	Krishnan–Panju	R. Sudarsanam	Tamil	Remake of Bengali film Maya Mriga
1962	Man Mauji	Kishore Kumar, Sadhana	Krishnan–Panju		Hindi	
1962	Main Chup Rahungi	Sunil Dutt, Meena Kumari	A. Bhimsingh		Hindi	Remake of Tamil Film 'Kalathur Kannamma'
1962	Veerathirumagan	C. L. Anandan, Sachu, E. V. Saroja	A. C. Tirulokchandar	M. S. Viswanathan	Tamil	50th Film
1962	Paarthaal Pasi Theerum	Sivaji Ganesan, Gemini Ganesan, Savitri, B. Saroja Devi, Kamal Haasan	A. Bhimsingh	M. S. Viswanathan	Tamil	
1961	Chhaya	Sunil Dutt, Asha Parekh, Nirupa Roy	Hrishikesh Mukherjee		Hindi	
1961	Pava Mannippu	Sivaji Ganesan, Gemini Ganesan, M. R. Radha, Savitri, Devika	A. Bhimsingh	M. S. Viswanathan	Tamil	
1960	Bindya	Balraj Sahni, Padmini	Krishnan–Panju		Hindi	Remake of Malayalam Film 'Thilakam'
1960	Thilakam	Prem Nazir, M. N. Rajam, Sriranjani	Krishnan–Panju		Malayalam	
1960	Kalathur Kannamma	Gemini Ganeshan, Savitri, Kamal Haasan	A. Bhimsingh	R. Sudarsanam	Tamil	Debut Film for Kamal Haasan
1960	Deivapiravi	Sivaji Ganesan, Padmini, S. S. Rajendran, M. N. Rajam	Krishnan–Panju	R. Sudarsanam	Tamil	
1960	Akash-Patal	Arundhati Devi, Pahari Sanyal	Prabhat Mukherjee		Bengali	First Bengali Film
1959	Sahodari	K. Balaji, Rajasulochana, J. P. Chandrababu	A. Bhimsingh		Tamil	
1959	Baap Bete	Ashok Kumar, Shyama	Raja Paranjape		Hindi	
1959	Mamiyar Mechina Marumagal	S. S. Rajendran, M. N. Rajam, G. Varalakshmi	Krishnan–Panju	R. Sudarsanam	Tamil	
1959	Barkha	Jagdeep, Shubha Khote, Nanda	Krishnan–Panju		Hindi	Remake of Tamil Film 'Mamiyar Mechina Marumagal'
1958	Bhookailas	N. T. Rama Rao, A. Nageswara Rao, Jamuna	K. Shankar		Telugu	
1958	Bhookailasa	Rajkumar, Kalyan Kumar, B. Saroja Devi	K. Shankar		Kannada	
1957	Bhabhi	Balraj Sahni, Pandari Bai, Nanda	Krishnan–Panju		Hindi	Remake of Tamil Film 'Kula Deivam'
1957	Hum Panchhi Ek Dal Ke	Jagdeep, Satish Vyas, Romi, Daisy Irani	P. L. Santoshi		Hindi	
1957	Miss Mary	Meena Kumari, Gemini Ganeshan, Kishore Kumar, Jamuna, Om Prakash	L. V. Prasad		Hindi	Remake of Telugu Film 'Missamma'
1956	Chori Chori	Raj Kapoor, Nargis, Pran	Anant Thakur		Hindi	
1956	Kula Dheivam	S. V. Sahasranamam, M. R. Santhanalakshmi, S. S. Rajendran, Pandari Bai	Krishnan–Panju	R. Sudarsanam	Tamil	
1956	Sadarama	A. Nageswara Rao, Sowcar Janaki, G. V. Iyer	K. R. Seetarama Sastry		Telugu	Remake of Kannada Film 'Sadarame'
1956	Sadarame	Kalyan Kumar, Sowcar Janaki, G. V. Iyer	K. R. Seetarama Sastry		Kannada	Produced with The Karnataka Films Ltd.
1956	Bhai-Bhai	Ashok Kumar, Kishore Kumar, Nimmi, Nirupa Roy	M. V. Raman		Hindi	
1956	Naga Devathai	R. Nagendra Rao, Sowcar Janaki, Jamuna	Chitrapu Narayana Rao		Tamil	Remake of Kannada Film 'Adarsha Sathi'
1956	Nagula Chavithi	R. Nagendra Rao, Sowcar Janaki, Jamuna, Nagabhushanam	Chitrapu Narayana Rao		Telugu	Remake of Kannada Film 'Adarsha Sathi'
1956	Doctor				Sinhala	First Sinhala Film
1955	Adarsha Sathi	R. Nagendra Rao, Sowcar Janaki, Jamuna	Chitrapu Narayana Rao		Kannada	
1955	Vadina	A. Nageswara Rao, Savitri, Pandari Bai	M. V. Raman		Telugu	Remake of Tamil Film 'Chella Pillai'
1955	Chella Pillai	K. R. Ramasamy, Savitri, Pandari Bai	M. V. Raman	R. Sudarsanam	Tamil	25th Film
1955	Shiv Bhakta	Shahu Modak, Padmini, Mishra, Pandari Bai, Anant Kumar, Kumari Devi, Sope, Rushendramani, Ramachandra Sastry, Ragini, Deshraj, Raju	H. L. N. Simha		Hindi	Remake of Kannada Film 'Bedara Kannappa'
1954	Sri Kalahastiswara Mahatyam	Rajkumar, K. Malathi, Rajasulochana	H. L. N. Simha	R. Sudarsanam R. Goverdhanam as Associate	Telugu	Remake of Kannada Film 'Bedara Kannappa'
1954	Jathaka Palam	S. V. Ranga Rao, R. Nagendra Rao, Chalam, Suryakala, Suryakantam	R. Nagendra Rao	R. Sudarsanam	Telugu	Remake of Kannada Film 'Jathaka Phala'
1954	Sangham	N. T. Rama Rao, Vyjayanthimala, S. Balachander, Anjali Devi	M. V. Raman	R. Sudarsanam	Telugu	Remake of Hindi Film 'Ladki'
1954	Penn	Gemini Ganesan, Vyjayanthimala, S. Balachander, Anjali Devi	M. V. Raman	R. Sudarsanam	Tamil	Remake of Hindi Film 'Ladki'
1954	Bedara Kannappa	Rajkumar, Pandari Bai, Rajasulochana	H. L. N. Simha	R. Sudarsanam	Kannada	Produced with The Karnataka Films Ltd. Debut Film for Rajkumar
1954	Andha Naal	Sivaji Ganesan, Pandari Bai, Javar Seetharaman	S. Balachander		Tamil	First Film without songs
1953	Jadhagam	R. Nagendra Rao, K. Sarangapani, T. K. Balachandran, Suryakala, Kamala Bai	R. Nagendra Rao		Tamil	Remake of Kannada Film 'Jathaka Phala'
1953	Jathaka Phala	R. Nagendra Rao, K. Sarangapani, T. K. Balachandran, Suryakala, Kamala Bai	R. Nagendra Rao		Kannada	
1953	Ladki	Bharat Bhushan, Vyjayanthimala, Kishore Kumar, Anjali Devi	M. V. Raman	R. Sudarsanam	Hindi	
1953	Sathya Sodhanai	Honnappa Bhagavathar, Pandari Bai	H. L. N. Simha	R. Sudarsanam	Tamil	Remake of Kannada Film Gunasagari
1953	Gunasagari	Honnappa Bhagavathar, Pandari Bai, Gubbi Veeranna	H. L. N. Simha	R. Sudarsanam	Kannada	Produced with The Karnataka Films Ltd.
1952	Parasakthi	Sivaji Ganesan, S. V. Sahasranamam, Pandari Bai, S. S. Rajendran	Krishnan–Panju	R. Sudarsanam	Tamil	Debut Film for Sivaji Ganesan
1951	Bahar	Karan Dewan, Vyjayanthimala, Pandari Bai, Om Prakash, Pran	M. V. Raman	R. Sudarsanam	Hindi	Remake of Tamil Film 'Vazhkai'
1951	Or Iravu	K. R. Ramasamy, T. S. Balaiah, A. Nageswara Rao, Lalitha	P. Neelakantan	R. Sudarsanam	Tamil	
1950	Jeevitham	T. R. Ramachandran, Vyjayanthimala, S. Varalakshmi, C. S. R. Anjaneyulu, C. H. Narayana Rao	A. V. Meiyappan, M. V. Raman	R. Sudarsanam	Telugu	Remake of Tamil Film 'Vazhkai'
1949	Vazhkai	T. R. Ramachandran, Vyjayanthimala, M. S. Draupadi, K. Sarangapani, S. V. Sahasranamam	A. V. Meiyappan, M. V. Raman	R. Sudarsanam	Tamil	Debut Film for Vyjayanthimala
1948	Vedhala Ulagam	T. R. Mahalingam, P. R. Mangalam, K. Sarangapani, K. R. Chellam	A. V. Meiyappan, P. Neelakantan	R. Sudarsanam	Tamil	
1947	Nam Iruvar	T. R. Mahalingam, T.A. Jayalakshmi, T. R. Ramachandran	A. V. Meiyappan	R. Sudarsanam	Tamil	First Film Produced under 'AVM Studios'
1945	Sri Valli	T. R. Mahalingam, Kumari Rukmini, T. R. Ramachandran, N. S. Krishnan, T. A. Madhuram	A. V. Meiyappan, A. T. Krishnaswamy	R. Sudarsanam	Tamil	Produced under 'Pragathi Studios'
1943	Satya Harishchandra	Subbaiah Naidu, R. Nagendra Rao, Lakshmi Bai	A. T. Krishnaswamy, R. Nagendra Rao		Kannada	Produced under 'Pragathi Studios'
1942	En Manaivi	K. Sarangapani, K. R. Chellam	Sundar Rao Nadkarni		Tamil	Produced under 'Pragathi Studios'
1941	Vasantasena	Subbaiah Naidu, R. Nagendra Rao, Lakshmi Bai	Ramayyar Shirur		Kannada	Produced under 'Pragathi Studios', First Kannada Film
1941	Sabapathy	T. R. Ramachandran, 'Lux Soap' R. Padma	A. T. Krishnaswamy		Tamil	Produced under 'Pragathi Studios'
1941	Thiruvalluvar	Serukalathur Sama, M. Lakshmanan, 'Tirunelveli' Pappa, T. R. Ramachandran	Prem Chethna		Tamil	Produced under 'Pragathi Studios'
1940	Bhoo Kailas	M. V. Subbaiah Naidu, R. Nagendra Rao, Lakshmi Bai	Sundar Rao Nadkarni		Telugu	Produced under 'Pragathi Studios', First Big Hit for A. V. Meiyappan
1940	Vaayadi	T. R. Ramachandran, Madhuri Devi, 'Lux Soap' R. Padma	Nandalal Jaswantlal		Tamil	Produced under 'Pragathi Studios'
1940	Poli Panchali		A. T. Krishnaswamy		Tamil	Produced under 'Pragathi Studios'
1937	Nandakumar	T. P. Rajalakshmi, C. V. V. Panthulu, T. R. Mahalingam	Keshav Rao Dhaibhar		Tamil	Produced under 'Pragati Pictures Ltd'
1935	Ratnavali	M. R. Krishnamoorthi, P. S. Rathna Bai, P. S. Saraswathi Bai			Tamil	Produced under 'Saraswathi Sound Productions'
1935	Alli Arjuna	K. S. Ananda Narayana Iyer, K. R. Kanthimathi Bai, T. S. Bhavani Bai			Tamil	Produced under 'Saraswathi Sound Productions'

=== Serials ===
- Mohini Kalaignar

=== Web series ===
- Tamil Rockerz (Sony Liv)

=== Films Distributed ===
- Babu - (1971)

== Awards ==
Ceremony	Year	Category	Nominee	Result	Ref.
National Film Awards	1954	Second Best Feature Film in Tamil	Andha Naal	Won	
National Film Awards	1954	Best Feature Film in Kannada	Bedara Kannappa	Won	
National Film Awards	1956	Best Feature Film in Tamil	Kula Dheivam	Won	
National Film Awards	1957	Best Children's Film	Hum Panchhi Ek Daal Ke	Won	
National Film Awards	1960	Best Film (Third prize)	Deivapiravi	Won	
National Film Awards	1960	Third Best Feature Film in Tamil	Kalathur Kannamma	Won	
National Film Awards	1961	Best Film (Second prize)	Paava Mannippu	Won	
National Film Awards	1962	Second Best Feature Film in Tamil	Annai	Won	
National Film Awards	1963	Best Feature Film in Tamil	Naanum Oru Penn	Won	
National Film Awards	1964	Third Best Feature Film in Tamil	Server Sundaram	Won	
National Film Awards	1965	Best Feature Film in Tamil	Kuzhandaiyum Deivamum	Won	
National Film Awards	1966	Best Feature Film in Tamil	Ramu	Won	
National Film Awards	1986	Best Popular Film Providing Wholesome Entertainment	Samsaram Adhu Minsaram	Won	
Cinema Express Awards	1986	Best Film	Samsaram Adhu Minsaram	Won	
Cinema Fans Award	1963	Best Film	Naanum Oru Penn	Won	
Film Fans Association Awards	1949	Best Film	Vaazhkai	Won	
Filmfare Awards South	1963	Best Film	Naanum Oru Penn	Won	
Filmfare Awards South	1964	Best Film	Server Sundaram	Won	
Filmfare Awards South	1986	Best Film	Samsaram Adhu Minsaram	Won	
Nandi Awards	1967	Best Film (Bronze)	Bhakta Prahlada	Won	
Tamil Nadu State Film Awards	1968	Best Film	Uyarndha Manithan	Won	
Tamil Nadu State Film Awards	2007	Best Film	Sivaji	Won	
Vijay Awards	2009	Favourite Film	Ayan	Won	
