= Jeene Ki Arzoo =

- Promotional poster
- Directed by: Rajasekhar
- Written by: Ram-Rahim
- Produced by: M. Kumaran; M. Saravanan; M. Balasubramaniam
- Starring: Mithun Chakraborty; Rakesh Roshan; Rati Agnihotri; Bindiya Goswami; Sujit Kumar
- Music by: Bappi Lahiri
- Production company: AVM Productions
- Release date: 4 December 1981
- Running time: 130 minutes
- Country: India
- Language: Hindi

Jeene Ki Arzoo (transl. The desire to live) is a 1981 Indian Hindi-language action film directed by Rajasekhar and produced by AVM Productions. The film stars Mithun Chakraborty, Rakesh Roshan, Rati Agnihotri, Bindiya Goswami and Sujit Kumar. It is a remake of director's own Kannada film Hunnimeya Rathriyalli.

== Plot ==
Before dying, the village priest curses the snake charmer, Raka for killing him and making his son Ravi (Rakesh Roshan) an orphan. Poor Ravi is taken care of by the village landlord who adopts him and makes him the brother of his daughter Poonam. Years pass by and it's time for Raka to pay for his sins. His only son Nagraj (Mithun Chakraborty) becomes the victim of the curse where he will be incarnated as a snake, killing anyone who makes contact with him. Things take a dramatic turn with the mysterious death of Poonam. Ravi investigates his sister's death to find out Nagraj is the culprit. Nagraj moonlights as a venomous snake that is out to kill women. Can the dangerous Nagraj be stopped from his killing spree? Will he be freed of the curse?

== Cast ==
- Mithun Chakraborty as Naagraj "Naagi"
- Rakesh Roshan as Ravi
- Rati Agnihotri as Laxmi
- Bindiya Goswami as Poonam
- Sujit Kumar as Raka
- Rajendranath
- Jagdeep
- Jayamalini

== Soundtrack ==
Lyrics: Anjaan

Song	Singer
"Aadhi Yeh Raat Jale"	Kishore Kumar
"Gupchup Chori Chori, Gori Kare Dil Chori"	S. P. Balasubrahmanyam, Lata Mangeshkar
"Kachi Kachi Ambiya"	Asha Bhosle
"Haath Na Lagana"	Asha Bhosle
