= Per Sollum Pillai =

- Poster
- Directed by: S. P. Muthuraman
- Written by: K. S. Gopalakrishnan (dialogues)
- Screenplay by: V. C. Guhanathan
- Story by: V. C. Guhanathan
- Produced by: M. Saravanan; M. Balasubramanian; M. S. Guhan
- Starring: Kamal Haasan; Radhika; Ramya Krishnan; Manorama; K. R. Vijaya; Raveendran
- Cinematography: T. S. Vinayagam
- Edited by: R. Vittal
- Music by: Ilaiyaraaja
- Production company: AVM Productions
- Release date: 16 July 1987
- Country: India
- Language: Tamil

Per Sollum Pillai (pronounced [peːɾ sollːum piɭɭːaɪ] transl. The child who made you proud) is a 1987 Indian Tamil-language drama film directed by S. P. Muthuraman, starring Kamal Haasan, Radhika, Manorama, K. R. Vijaya , Babu antony and Raveendran. It is loosely based on the 1960 film Padikkadha Medhai. Both of these films' dialogues were written by K. S. Gopalakrishnan. The film was released on 16 July 1987. It was later remade in Telugu as Ramu (1987). The film was dubbed in Telugu as Maa Inti Krishnudu.

== Plot ==
Ramu is an orphan, who is adopted by a wealthy family. He gets adopted into the family as a child when he saves them from being deliberately poisoned by a miscreant. Rajalakshmi, the mother of the family, raises him as one of the family even though others outside the family see him as a servant. Ramu helps to run the family smoothly and looks after his Adopted, brothers and sisters like his own. He remains faithful and grateful to his Adopted-parents for adopting him, an orphan, as their own son. Except for his Adopted and his little sister, the other members of his family are jealous of the position his mother gives him in the family. Ramu's Adopted brothers are pleasure-seeking and lazy and want to live an easy life surviving on their mother's earnings. They also try to exploit a female worker in their house Seetha, whose mother Muniyamma is the cook of the house.

Ramu intervenes whenever his Adopted-brothers attempt to commit mischief in the family and thwarts all their plans. He tries to advise them to be resourceful, but they hate him for that. They also cannot stand it when their mother sides their Adopted-brother in all her decisions. Ramu also saves his Adopted-sister Rekha from being exploited by a wealthy smuggler Banuprasad's son. Due to his carnal nature, Banuprasad's son expresses to his father his wish to marry Ramu's Adopted-sister. So Banuprasad comes to Rajalakshmi's house seeking her daughter's hand in marriage for his son. Banuprasad feels jaded when Ramu convinces his Adopted-mother to refuse her daughter's hand in marriage to his son. Banuprasad becomes an enemy to the family and swears to take revenge for being insulted by Rajalakshmi, and hatches a plot in conjunction with Ramu's brother-in-law, a corrupt government official Nagalingam to destroy Ramu's family.

Banuprasad plants illegal explosives in Rajalakshmi's fireworks factory to frame her, to get her arrested by the police, but Ramu comes to her rescue and takes the crime upon himself and goes to jail in her place. He later looks after her when she falls sick when her own sons do not care about her and waste their money in gambling. Instigated by a plot hatched by their brother-in-law, Ramu's Adopted-brothers revolt and take over the factory that their mother controls. They then force Ramu out of the house. Meanwhile, Seetha falls in love with Ramu due to his truthful nature. Ramu's Adopted-brothers make poor business decisions and ruin the prosperous business that their mother had struggled to build. Ramu meanwhile, through his hard-work and resourcefulness builds his own fireworks factory. He comes to the rescue of his mother again when his Adopted-brothers try to forcibly marry their only sister to the enemy's son to cover up their losses. He pays for the losses his brothers had incurred and saves his Adopted-sister and Adopted-parents. He then adopts his Adopted-mother as his own mother and makes her the proprietor of his factory.

In the final scene, Banuprasad tries to forcibly get his son married to Rajalakshmi's daughter and also murder her sons and Ramu. Ramu again comes to their rescue and saves the day. But Rajalakshmi is fatally wounded by Banuprasad and dies in Ramu's arms. The film ends with Ramu's daughter (whom Ramu considers as his own mother that he lost but is now reborn as his daughter, and names her after his mother) celebrating her birthday with the entire family reunited with Ramu as the head of the family.

== Cast ==
- Kamal Haasan as Ramu
- K. R. Vijaya as Rajalakshmi
- Radhika as Seetha
- Ramya Krishnan as Rekha
- Malaysia Vasudevan as Banuprasad
- Babu Antony
- Raveendran
- Ilavarasan as Rekha's husband
- Manorama as Muniyamma
- Jai Ganesh as Thiyagarajan
- Goundamani as Nagalingam
- Peeli Sivam as Manager
- Sangeetha as Chandra
- Leo Prabhu
- Baby Sujitha

== Production ==
The story of Per Sollum Pillai was written by V. C. Guhanathan and it was loosely based on Padikkatha Medhai. K. S. Gopalakrishnan, who wrote the dialogues for that film, did the same for this film.

== Soundtrack ==
The music was composed by Ilaiyaraaja.

Song	Singers	Lyrics
"Ammamma Vanthathingu"	Kamal Haasan	Pulamaipithan
"Maadi Eri Vama"	S. P. Balasubrahmanyam, S. Janaki	Gangai Amaran
"Per Sollum Pillai" (Lady)	P. Susheela	Gangai Amaran
"Per Sollum Pillai" (Men)	S. P. Balasubrahmanyam	Gangai Amaran
"Thappu Thanda Panniduven"	S. P. Balasubrahmanyam, S. Janaki	Gangai Amaran
"Vellakethu"	Malaysia Vasudevan	Gangai Amaran

== Release and reception ==
Per Sollum Pillai was released on 16 July 1987. N. Krishnaswamy of The Indian Express wrote, 'While the sharp edge of the assertive selfishness and sadism of the bad characters of the 1960 film kept violating the good characters (and the audience that identified with them) in an obviously masochistic exercise, one must be thankful that there is no scope for that sort of indulgence in Paer Sollum Pillai". Jayamanmadhan of Kalki wrote that the "richness" of AVM's films was there in this film too, but only in the sets.

== Bibliography ==
- Muthuraman, S. P. (2017) [2005]. AVM Thandha SPM (in Tamil) (3rd ed.). Vikatan. OCLC 607342391.
