= Mambattiyan =

- Theatrical release poster
- Directed by: Thiagarajan
- Screenplay by: Thiagarajan
- Based on: Malaiyoor Mambattiyan (Tamil)
- Produced by: Thiagarajan; Shanthi Thiagarajan; Prashanth; Haresh Vikram Vijayakumar
- Starring: Prashanth; Meera Jasmine; Mumaith Khan; Prakash Raj; Vadivelu
- Cinematography: Anil K Sekar; Shaji Kumar
- Edited by: Don Max
- Music by: S. Thaman
- Production company: Lakshmi Shanthi Movies
- Distributed by: Staar Movies
- Release date: 16 December 2011
- Running time: 155 minutes
- Country: India
- Language: Tamil

Mambattiyan (transl. The man with the shovel) is a 2011 Indian Tamil-language vigilante film co-written, produced and directed by Thiagarajan, starring his son Prashanth as the title character. The film, also starring Meera Jasmine, Prakash Raj, Vadivelu and Mumaith Khan in other pivotal roles, is a remake of the 1983 Tamil film Malaiyoor Mambattiyan that starred Thiagarajan. The film was released on 16 December 2011.

== Plot ==
IG Ranjith (Prakash Raj) recalls the memories of a criminal ) rules a village in western Tamil Nadu. When he is opposed by Mambattiyan's (Prashanth) father Chinnasamy (Vijayakumar), the "jameen" kills him. Coming to know of this, Mambattiyan kills Annachi and those in support of him. A group of youngsters in the village join hands with Mambattiyan. They lead a life in a forest. By robbing the rich and distributing the wealth to the poor, Mambattiyan becomes the local Robin Hood.

Meanwhile, police forces led by Ranjith go from pillar to post to nab Mambattiyan. This is the start of a cat-and-mouse game between the two. Also, Mambattiyan has romance in the form of Kannathal (Meera Jasmine) and Sornam (Mumaith Khan). When Sornam raises a green flag, that means she needs him to come. An officer in disguises realises this and reports it to Ranjith, so one by one, all of his gang members die. Sornam later commits suicide.

Meanwhile, Kannathal panicked and asked Mambattiyan to go to a faraway place and forgo his Robin Hood job. Mambattiyan agrees and asks her to wait at the river. With the help of Bullet (Ravi Shanth), a villager, Kannathal waits at the river. Mambattiyan defeats the police forces and escapes. However, Bullet shoots Mambattiyan because whoever captures Mambattiyan gets a rewards of money and land. Kannathal hits Bullet, and he dies, then she dies too.

At the end, Ranjith is sad that the whole village is crying, and he takes Mambattiyan's chain.

== Cast ==
- Prashanth as Mambattiyan
- Meera Jasmine as Kannathal
- Mumaith Khan as Sornam
- Prakash Raj as IG Ranjith
- Vadivelu as Silk Singaram
- Vijayakumar as Chinnasamy, Mambattiyan's father
- Kota Srinivasa Rao as Annachchi Sundaralingam
- Manobala as Sundaralingam's accountant
- Rama as Thangam, Mambattiyan's mother
- Riyaz Khan as Fake Mambattiyan
- Kalairani as Village Doctor
- Ganeshkar as Driver
- Ravi Shanth as Bullet
- Hemalatha as Kanmani
- Aravinth as Oomaiyan
- Vengal Rao as Singaram's sidekick
- Vijay Ganesh as Singaram's sidekick
- Chelladurai as Singaram's sidekick
- G. A. Jagadeesan as Singaram's sidekick
- Shanti Priya
- Raaghav in a special appearance

== Production ==
It was first reported in September 2008, that Thiagarajan would remake Rajasekhar's 1983 film Malaiyoor Mambattiyan, with his son Prashanth portraying the lead role of a Robin Hood-esque figure. Meera Jasmine, Prakash Raj and Mumaith Khan were assigned roles shortly after, while the team also held talks with Kalabhavan Mani unsuccessfully for another role. The team began filming in early 2009, with Thiagarajan noting that apart from the plot, most features in the film would be different from the original. Prashanth put on weight for this film and the team shot in the forests of Tamil Nadu, Kerala and Karnataka. The team also filmed scenes in virgin locales across Orissa in the backdrop of waterfalls.

By April 2010, production had been ongoing for fifteen months and the film was still incomplete. The team also announced that they were planning to bring in Mallika Sherawat to play a role depicted by Silk Smitha in the original, but it did not materialise. Thiagarajan approached Thaman to compose the film's music only after completing the film's shoot and asked him to retain two songs from the original film. Prashanth and Thiagarajan then briefly postponed the film and began work on another venture, the historical Ponnar Shankar, and subsequently released that film earlier than Mambattiyan. The film finally geared up for release in December 2011, more than three years after production began, when the son of a tribal leader called Mambattiyan filed a petition preventing the release of the film. He withdrew the claims shortly after.

== Soundtrack ==
The soundtrack was composed by Thaman and was released live on Sun Music's channel on 23 November 2011. Actor Silambarasan recorded a song for the film, with the making of the song video being used for promotional purposes. The songs "Chinna Ponnu" and "Kaattuvazhi" were reused from Malaiyoor Mambattiyan.

Song	Singer(s)	Lyrics
"Chinna Ponnu"	Harish Raghavendra, Shaila, Sanjeev Kumar	Vairamuthu
"Karuppanswamy"	Ranjith, Priya Himesh	Annamalai
"Kaattuvazhi"	Thiagarajan	Vairamuthu
"Kaattuvazhi Remix"	Silambarasan, Aalap Raju, Vijay Yesudas, Devi Sri Prasad, Dhina	Vairamuthu
"Malaiyooru"	S. Thaman, Srivardhini, Megha, Janani Madhan, Rita	Na. Muthukumar
"Yedho Agudhey"	Rita	Na. Muthukumar

== Release and reception ==
The film opened in December 2011. Malathi Rangarajan of The Hindu claimed that "Thyagarajan has developed and executed a screenplay without gaffes, which gallops at commendable speed. Eschewing frills, he holds the viewer's attention throughout". In her review, she also added "in action, comedy, sadness and sedateness, Prashanth always makes a mark" and that "Mambattiyaan should be a milestone in Prashanth's career". The New Indian Express also gave the film a positive review, noting "For, makers while replicating the content, invariably fail to capture the soul of the original. But, Thiagarajan has managed to recapture the essence of his earlier work, even while giving the rustic saga a more contemporary feel. The screenplay is taut, the director rarely losing his grip on his narration." A reviewer from Sify.com noted the film "is a bit dated, though it moves at a rapid pace" and that it "is not engaging like the original". A critic from IANS noted "It is predictable, tame, outdated and slow. No single scene could be cited as well conceived or well made. Full of cliches".

The film took a good opening at the box office, but petered out to do average business commercially and due to its big budget, failed to recover costs.

== Legacy ==
The song "Malaiyooru" became popular during the early 2010s. It was used in the Tamil film Tourist Family (2025), mocking the bride (one of the main character's ex) dancing to this for her husband and also his brother and father dancing to this song. The song was also used in the Malayalam film Prince and Family (also 2025) in a comical situation, just like in Tourist Family.
