= Jeevan Jyoti (1976 film) =

- Directed by: Murugan Kumaran
- Written by: Mullapudi Venkata Ramana
- Produced by: M. Saravanan; M. Balasubramaniam; M. S. Guhan
- Starring: Vijay Arora; Bindiya Goswami
- Edited by: R. G. Gope
- Music by: Salil Chowdhury
- Production company: AVM Productions
- Distributed by: AVM Productions
- Release date: 1976
- Country: India
- Language: Hindi

Jeevan Jyoti is a 1976 Bollywood drama film directed by Murugan Kumaran under AVM Productions. It stars Vijay Arora, Bindiya Goswami in lead roles. It is a remake of Telugu film Muthyala Muggu (1975).

== Plot ==
Shekhar (Vijay Arora) goes to his friends sister Laxmi's (Bindiya Goswami) marriage with Mohan. During the marriage the police arrests Mohan. People begin to say who will marry Laxmi now. Shekhar marries Laxmi. They are happy and Laxmi becomes expecting mother. When Mohan returns, he wants to take revenge. Hence he sneaks into Laxmi's bedroom in absence of Shekhar and Laxmi is sleeping. When Shekhar enters the room, he finds Mohan in Laxmi's room. He assumes that Laxmi and Mohan were in a relationship and he was the one who came in between. He asks Laxmi to leave his house. Laxmi leaves and then she gives birth to twins -Shanti and Ramu. Shanti and Ramu then create a plan to bring their parents together again. Their plan is successful and Mohan admits his crime. Shekhar realizes that Laxmi is pure and innocent, and he accepts her. Shekhar, Laxmi, Shanti and Ramu are together and happy in the end.

== Cast ==
- Vijay Arora as Shekhar
- Bindiya Goswami as Laxmi
- Rakesh Pandey as Harbans
- A. K. Hangal as Raja Kamlakar
- Sulochana Chatterjee as Pratima
- Dinesh Hingoo as Raja's Munim
- Sudhir as Mohan
- Satyendra Kapoor as Somnath
- Om Shivpuri as Gopaldas Chaurasia
- Dulari as Ratna Chaurasia
- Bhanumathi as Lata Chaurasia
- Jayamalini as Sudha
- Bheeshma as Bhagwan Shri Hanuman
- Ritu Kamal as Sundari
- Baby Mun Mun as Shanti
- Raju Shrestha as Ramu

== Crew ==
- Director - Murugan Kumaran
- Story - Mullapudi Venkata Ramana
- Producer - M. Saravanan, M. Balasubramanian, M. S. Guhan
- Editor - R. G. Gope
- Production Company - A. V. M. Productions
- Distributors - Rajshri Productions
- Music Director - Salil Choudhury
- Lyrics - Anand Bakshi
- Playback Singers - Lata Mangeshkar, Kishore Kumar, Asha Bhosle, Usha Mangeshkar, P. B. Sreenivas

== Music ==
Music: Salil Chowdhury Lyricist: Anand Bakshi

Song	Singer
"Duniya Rang Badalti Jaye"	Lata Mangeshkar
"Jis Dware Par Ghar Ki Bahu"	Lata Mangeshkar
"Ranjhe Ki Aankhon Se Dekho Heer Ko, Mujhko Chhedo"	Lata Mangeshkar, Kishore Kumar
"Maujon Ki Doli Chali Re"	Kishore Kumar
"Suno Sunate Hain Tumko Ek Dukhbhari Kahani"	Usha Mangeshkar, Asha Bhosle
"Yeh Ghunghroo"	Asha Bhosle
"Jako Rakhe Saiyan"	P. B. Sreenivas
