= Evaraina Epudaina =

- Directed by: Marthand K Shankar
- Written by: Marthand K Shankar
- Produced by: M. Sarvanan; MS Guhan
- Starring: Varun Sandesh; Vimala Raman
- Cinematography: Venugopal Madathil
- Edited by: Marthand K. Venkatesh
- Music by: Mani Sharma
- Distributed by: AVM Productions
- Release date: 26 June 2009
- Country: India
- Language: Telugu

Evaraina Epudaina (transl. Anyone Anytime) is a 2009 Telugu-language romantic comedy film directed and written by Marthand K Shankar. It stars Varun Sandesh and Vimala Raman, released on 26 June 2009. The film's title is based on a song from Anandam.

== Plot ==
Venkat is a carefree guy. He is a smart youngster who looks for people around him who are in love, then he blackmails them by threatening to tell their family of their love unless they pay him money for his silence. He gets into a fight because he took money from a couple by blackmailing, there he sees a girl Madhumita and it is love at first sight for Venkat. Meanwhile, his grandma gets hurt and he takes her to a hospital, an old woman is admitted in the same room, later he finds out she is Madhumita's grandma. He gets an opportunity to impress her, he pretends to save her grandma and they both become good friends. Venkat's close friend confesses him that he is in love with the daughter of Madhumita's father. He thinks that his friend is going to be engaged to Madhumita.

This prompts Venkat to play a spoilsport during the engagement ceremony, he tries to break the engagement and also succeeds in breaking the engagement. Soon after the engagement breaks he realised that his friend is in love with Madhumita's sister and was getting engaged to her. Venkat is shocked and is in a fixed situation as he can't tell the truth to Madhumita and her family as they would hate him after knowing the truth. He gets close to her family in the meantime, also Madhumita falls in love with him. In the temple, she overhears Venkat's friend telling him that it was a good plan to break Adarsh and Madumita's sister's engagement. Venkat sees Madhumita and tries to explain to her that it was an misunderstanding, but she was not ready to listen. Venkat then become a responsible person and joins his brother's office, he respects lovers and understands other's feeling. He also manages to get Adarsh and Madhumita's sister together in the meantime. He then goes to Madhumita and explains to her and tries to convince her that everything was a misunderstanding, he tells her that he is a changed person and has got a good job for her. She understands him and his feeling's, the film ends with Venkat and Madhumita getting together.

== Cast ==
- Varun Sandesh as Venkat
- Vimala Raman as Madhumita
- Rama Prabha as Madhumita's grandma
- Giri Babu as Madhumita's father
- Ali as Shivam, Madhumita's brother-in-law
- Rashmi Gautam as Madhumita's sister
- Venu Madhav as Dr. Bhargav
- Brahmanandam as Kutumba Rao (special appearance)
- Aadarsh Balakrishna as Raja
- Anu Hasan as Venkat's sister-in-law
- Kovai Sarala as Nurse
- Duvvasi Mohan
- Ramaprabha
- Telangana Shakuntala
- Surekha Vani
- Kamesh Sista (cameo)

== Soundtrack ==
The music was composed by Mani Sharma and released by Aditya Music. The Audio launch function was held on the night of 1 June 2009, at Green Park Hotel, Hyderabad.

Evaraina Epudaina

Soundtrack album by Mani Sharma
- Released: 1 June 2009
- Recorded: 2009
- Genre: Feature film soundtrack
- Length: 32:52
- Language: Telugu
- Label: Aditya Music
- Producer: Mani Sharma

Mani Sharma chronology
| Bhadradri (2009) | Evaraina Epudaina (2009) | Mithrudu (2010) |

Track-List
| No. | Title | Lyrics | Singer(s) | Length |
|---|---|---|---|---|
| 1. | "Akasamalo" | Krishna Chaitanya | Tippu | 4:02 |
| 2. | "Malli Malli" | Rahaman | Rita, Rahul Nambiar | 4:22 |
| 3. | "Na Manase" | Bhaskarabhatla | Ranjith | 4:19 |
| 4. | "Madhura Yathana" | Veturi | Rita | 4:13 |
| 5. | "Vaare Vaa" | Rahaman | Rita | 4:13 |
| 6. | "Neelalu Garu" | Vennelakanti | Hemachandra, Malavika | 4:23 |
| 7. | "Vaanemo Thadisi" | Krishna Chaitanya | Varun Sandesh | 2:07 |
| 8. | "Nara Naramentilaa" | Krishna Chaitanya | Rahul Nambiar | 5:13 |
| Total length: | | | | 32:52 |

== Reception ==
=== Critical response ===
A reviewer of Idlebrain.com wrote "The director has kept everything aside to concentrate on entertainment aspect (just like in the movies of Ravi Teja). On a whole, Evaraina Epudaina falls short of what makes an average film, but still has some potential at box office in urbane centres due to the entertainment value and good packaging". A reviewer of Bangalore Mirror says "But, it is hard to believe how a lean and lanky Varun defeats his opponents with a single fisticuff! Debutante Tamil beauty Vimala Raman is okay while the rest of the starcast is average. There is nothing special about Mani Sharma's music". R. G. Vijayasarathy from Rediff.com wrote "Despite some negative points, Varun's enthusiasm and Vimala Raman's neat performance make Evaraina Epudaina worth watching".
