= Sonthakkaran =

- Poster
- Directed by: L. Raja
- Written by: V. C. Guhanathan
- Produced by: M. Saravanan; M. Balasubramanian; M. S. Guhan
- Starring: Arjun; Nirosha
- Cinematography: K. S. Selvaraj
- Edited by: R. Vittal; S. B. Mohan
- Music by: Chandrabose
- Production company: AVM Productions
- Release date: 16 June 1989
- Running time: 128 minutes
- Country: India
- Language: Tamil

Sonthakkaran (transl. Relative) is a 1989 Indian Tamil-language action film, directed by L. Raja and produced by M. Saravanan, M. Balasubramanian and M. S. Guhan. The film stars Arjun and Nirosha, while Sarath Babu, Madhuri, Radha Ravi and S. S. Chandran portray pivotal roles. The film was released on 16 June 1989.

== Plot ==
Policeman Rajadurai "Raja" arrests Yuvaraj for raping a woman and killing an old man. Chalapathi Rao, the father of Yuvaraj, gets Rajadurai trapped in a false rape charge and he loses his job. Yuvaraj comes back from jail to take revenge against Rajadurai.

== Cast ==
- Arjun as Rajadurai "Raja"
- Nirosha as Rekha
- Sarath Babu as Chelladurai
- Madhuri as Lakshmi
- Radha Ravi as Chalapathi Rao
- S. S. Chandran as Singaram
- Nasser as Yuvaraj
- Charle as a resident of Bharath Nagar
- Chinni Jayanth as Vasu
- Silk Smitha as Sudha
- Master Vimal as young Rajadurai
- Master Suresh as young Chelladurai
- Master Charan as Babu
- G. Srinivasan as Rajadurai and Chelladurai's father
- K. K. Soundar as a bus conductor
- Yuvasree as a victim of Yuvaraj
- Kumaresan as Vasu's friend
- Peeli Sivam as a police inspector
- Premi as bus conductor's wife
- Ennathe Kannaiah as Chelladurai's farm worker
- Pasi Sathya as Sathya
- Omakuchi Narasimhan as Chalapathi Rao's assistant
- Jeeva as Ravayya
- Azhagu as RKV
- Thideer Kannaiah as Chelladurai and Sudha's servant
- K. Rajan as a resident of Bharath Nagar

== Soundtrack ==
The music was composed by Chandrabose and lyrics were written by Vairamuthu.

Song	Singers	Length	Notes
"Sonthakkaran Yar Sonthakkaran"	S. P. Balasubrahmanyam, Vairamuthu (Voice Over)	04:06	
"Ethala Kuthala Mathala"	Malaysia Vasudevan, S. P. Sailaja & Chorus	04:33	
"Katti Thangame Unnai" (Happy)	K. J. Yesudas, S. Janaki	04:15	Version 1
"Pattu Sattai Pottu Vantha"	S. P. Balasubrahmanyam & Chorus	04:32	
"Aththane Aththane Azhagu"	S. Janaki	03:58	
"Thimingalatha Muzhingkitu"	S. P. Balasubrahmanyam & Chorus	04:24	
"Katti Thangame Unnai" (Pathos)	S. P. Balasubrahmanyam, S. Janaki	04:35	Version 2
"Kodambakkam Virgambakkam Pakkam Povoma"	S. P. Balasubrahmanyam, S. P. Sailaja	04:15	
"Katti Thangame Unnai" (Pathos)	S. Janaki, Sarath Babu & Silk Smitha (Voice Over)	03:58	Version 3
