= Pudhu Varisu =

- Directed by: Rajasekhar
- Written by: Gopu (dialogues)
- Screenplay by: Rajasekhar
- Starring: Pandiarajan; Rohini
- Cinematography: Jayam; S. Adhi
- Edited by: M. Vellaisamy; K. N. Sivanandhan
- Music by: Chandrabose
- Production company: Uzhaikkum Karangal Art Productions
- Release date: 31 August 1990
- Running time: 120 minutes
- Country: India
- Language: Tamil

Pudhu Varisu (transl. New heir) is a 1990 Indian Tamil language comedy film written and directed by Rajasekhar. The film stars Pandiarajan and Rohini. It was released on 31 August 1990.

== Plot ==
Pandian does not know his father and his mother Parvathi dies. Parvathi falls in love with Sundaram, a surveyor in a mission. Sundaram leaves the village promising that he would return soon to marry her. Parvathi became pregnant and Sundaram didn't return. Pandian looks for his father to take revenge.

== Cast ==
- Pandiarajan as Pandiyan
- Rohini
- Mouli as Sundaram
- Manjula as Meenakshi
- S. S. Chandran
- Padmapriya
- Disco Shanti
- Dilip
- Raja
- V. Gopalakrishnan
- Loose Mohan
- M.R.K.
- K. Natraj as Mayandi
- Oru Viral Krishna Rao as Sundaram
- Typist Gopu as Murugan

== Production ==
Pudhu Varisu is the first film for Riaz K. Ahmed as public relations officer (PRO). He was previously an assistant PRO in Maaveeran (1986) by the same director.

== Soundtrack ==
The soundtrack was composed by Chandrabose, with lyrics written by Vaali.

Track listing
No.	Title	Lyrics	Singer(s)	Length
1.	"Andhathi Naan Paada"	Vaali	K. Prabhakar, S. P. Sailaja
2.	"Kend Meenu Keluthu Meenu"	Vaali	S. P. Sailaja
3.	"Kothu Kothaga"	Vaali	K. J. Yesudas, Vani Jairam
4.	"Neerada Than"	Vaali	S. P. Sailaja
5.	"Uravula Oru"	Rajasekhar	Mano, K. Prabhakar
