= Veeran Veluthambi =

- Directed by: Rama Narayanan
- Written by: M. Karunanidhi
- Produced by: N. Radha
- Starring: Radha Ravi
- Cinematography: N. K. Viswanathan
- Edited by: Rajkeerthi
- Music by: S. A. Rajkumar
- Production company: Sri Thenandal Films
- Release date: 3 June 1987
- Running time: 127 minutes
- Country: India
- Language: Tamil

Veeran Veluthambi is a 1987 Indian Tamil-language action film directed by Rama Narayanan and written by M. Karunanidhi, starring Radha Ravi. It was released on 3 June 1987.

== Cast ==
- Radha Ravi as Veeran Veluthambi
- Ambika as Malavizhi, as Inspector and Veluthambi's lover
- Chandrasekhar as Mugilan
- Rekha as Meghala
- Vijayakanth as Inspector Rahman (guest appearance)
- Viji as Jameela, Rahman's wife
- Karthik as Thirumalai (guest appearance)
- A. V. M. Rajan as IG
- Jai Ganesh
- S. S. Chandran as Bhoothalingam
- Thyagu as Minor Maadasamy
- Pasi Sathya as Sharadamma
- Senthil as Constable Ezhumalai
- Ceylone Manohar as Thandavaraya
- Madhuri as Thurikallu Meena
- Kumari Mutthu as Sivanthayya
- Vellai Subbayy
- Pilwan Ranganathan

== Production ==
Vijayakanth made a special appearance, and charged no remuneration for doing so.

== Soundtrack ==
The music was composed by S. A. Rajkumar.

Song	Singers	Lyrics
"Adi Kattalaga Maane"	Mano, Uma Ramanan	S. A. Rajkumar
"Paayi Viruchen"	Vani Jairam	S. A. Rajkumar
"Surulu Meesai"	S. A. Rajkumar	M. Karunanidhi
"Vechakuri"	Malaysia Vasudevan, K. S. Chithra	S. A. Rajkumar
"Vetta Veli"	S. A. Rajkumar	S. A. Rajkumar
