= Baamma Maata Bangaru Baata =

- Theatrical release poster
- Directed by: Rajasekhar
- Written by: Jandhyala (dialogues)
- Screenplay by: Rajasekhar
- Story by: Chitralaya Gopu
- Produced by: M. Saravan; M. Balasubramaniyan
- Starring: Bhanumathi Ramakrishna; Rajendra Prasad; Gautami; Nutan Prasad
- Cinematography: Ranga
- Edited by: R. Vittal; C. Laasni
- Music by: Chandrabose
- Production company: AVM Productions
- Release date: 9 March 1989
- Running time: 148 minutes
- Country: India
- Language: Telugu

Baamma Maata Bangaru Baata (transl. Granny's Word is a Golden Route) is a 1989 Indian Telugu-language comedy film produced by M. Saravan and M. Balasubramanian of AVM Productions and directed by Rajasekhar. It stars Bhanumathi Ramakrishna, Rajendra Prasad, Gautami and Nutan Prasad, with music composed by Chandrabose. The film is a remake of AVM's Tamil film Paatti Sollai Thattathe (1988).

Though critically and commercially acclaimed, this film is infamous for the on-set accident in which Nutan Prasad broke his back. This left him paralysed from the waist down and he used a wheelchair for the remainder of his life.

== Cast ==
- Bhanumathi Ramakrishna as Rajyalakshmamma
- Rajendra Prasad as Krishna Murthy / Kishtaiah
- Gautami as Seeta
- Nutan Prasad as Suraiah
- Silk Smitha as Anasuya
- Padmanabham as Govindu
- Rallapalli as Inspector
- Suthi Velu as Lawyer Kukuteswara Rao
- Brahmanandam as Lawyer Keerti
- Sakshi Ranga Rao as Gumastha
- Anandaraj as Anasuya's husband
- Hema Sundar
- Potti Prasad
- K. K. Sarma
- Chidatala Appa Rao
- Dham
- Preethi as Reetha
- Chilakala Radha as Manga
- Kalpana Rai

== Soundtrack ==
Music was composed by Chandrabose. Lyrics were written by Veturi. The music is released on AVM Audio Company.

Song title	Singers	Length
"Delhi Ki Raja Aina"	Bhanumathi Ramakrishna	3:55
"Maa Palle Gopaluda"	S. P. Balasubrahmanyam, Bhanumathi Ramakrishna	4:57
"Chenna Patnam"	S. P. Balasubrahmanyam, S. P. Sailaja	3:46
"Prematho"	S. P. Balasubrahmanyam, S. Janaki	2:57
"Salam Sadugudu"	S. P. Balasubrahmanyam, S.P. Sailaja	4:17
"Prematho" (Pathos)	S. P. Balasubrahmanyam, S.Janaki	4:11
