= Paattondru Ketten =

1991 film by V. C. Guhanathan

- VCD cover
- Directed by: V. C. Guhanathan
- Written by: V. C. Guhanathan
- Produced by: M. Saravanan; M. Balasubramanian
- Starring: Rahman; Sithara
- Cinematography: Ranga
- Music by: Maragathamani
- Production company: Balasubramaniam & Co
- Release date: 5 December 1991
- Country: India
- Language: Tamil

Paattondru Ketten (transl. I heard a song) is a 1991 Indian Tamil-language thriller film written and directed by V. C. Guhanathan. The film stars Rahman and Sithara, with Nizhalgal Ravi, Rekha and Ranjan in supporting roles. It was released on 5 December 1991.

== Cast ==
- Rahman as Raghu
- Sithara as Sneha
- Y. G. Mahendran
- Ranjan
- Nizhalgal Ravi
- Rekha as Usha
- Sindhu
- Livingston as Rocky

== Soundtrack ==
Soundtrack was composed by Maragatha Mani. Lyrics were written by Vairamuthu.

Song	Singers
"Sippi Vaytriley Muthu"	S. P. Balasubrahmanyam, K. S. Chithra
"Hey Pachathanniyil"	S. P. Balasubrahmanyam
"Lap Tap Lap Tap"	Sadhana, C. Rajamani
"Oru Siru Paravai"	K. S. Chithra, S. P. Balasubrahmanyam
"Paattondru Ketten"	S. P. Balasubrahmanyam
"Yaar Intha Raagam"	K. S. Chithra
"Yaar Enthan Raagam"	K. S. Chithra

== Release and reception ==
Paattondru Ketten was released on 5 December 1991. N. Krishnaswamy of The Indian Express on his review, dated 6 December 1991, wrote that the script "does not seem to be developing their characters at all" and also criticised the performances of the lead pair. He indicated that they "don't seem to be serious at all about the role they are portraying". C. R. K. of Kalki praised the performances of star cast and concluded there are a couple of hiccups in the set of incidents but they are swept away amidst the lively entertainment.
