= Cooliekkaran =

- Theatrical release poster
- Directed by: Rajasekhar
- Screenplay by: Rajasekhar
- Story by: Tinnu Anand
- Produced by: S. Thanu
- Starring: Vijayakanth; Rupini
- Cinematography: V. Ranga
- Edited by: R. Vittal; S.B. Mohan
- Music by: T. Rajendar
- Production company: Kalaipuli Films International
- Release date: 4 June 1987
- Running time: 138 minutes
- Country: India
- Language: Tamil

Cooliekkaran (transl. Male coolie) is a 1987 Indian Tamil-language action thriller film directed by Rajasekhar and produced by S. Thanu. The film stars Vijayakanth and Rupini, in her Tamil cinema debut. It is a remake of the Hindi film Kaalia (1981). The film was released on 4 June 1987. Through this film Vijayakanth got the title "Puratchi Kalaignar" (transl. Revolutionary Artist), bestowed upon him by Thanu.

== Plot ==
Raja lives with his elder brother Velu, sister-in-law Lakshmi, and their little daughter. He spends his time idle and is scolded by Velu. Raja decides to become a coolie and transport articles. Unfortunately, he is jailed for smuggling. Velu also gets into an accident at work at the mill and loses his arms and job, while also needing money for treatment. Raja is released and begs Velu's boss Chakravarthy, but he refuses. Raja breaks into Chakravarthy's safe to get the money, but it is too late as Velu dies. Chakravarthy throws Raja in jail. This is where he meets David and decides to seek revenge. In jail, Raja meets the warden Marthandan, whose daughter was kidnapped by one of the prisoners when she was little.

After his release, he is a different, stronger man. He and his accomplices steal the gold that Chakravarthy had been smuggling at the mill. Raja and his accomplices lie to Lakshmi and move from poverty into riches. Raja and his men snatch a very rare diamond. Priya steals it (fake diamond). Meanwhile, Ramanathan, who was once a henchman of Chakravarthy, is killed by him. Ramanathan was assigned to kill Jai and his family in an accident. Marthandan's wife is killed, and Ramanathan keeps the child with him. Priya is now reformed. She and Raja fall in love, and for their engagement, he buys all the flowers in the city. Marthandan grows suspicious and starts following Raja. Chakravarthy buys a counterfeit machine, which is spoiled by Raja. Enraged by this, Chakravarthy spills the beans to Lakshmi that Raja is a smuggler. Lakshmi urges Raja to leave this business, and Chakravarthy throws Raja in jail again. How Raja escapes and gets his revenge on Chakravarthy forms the rest of the film.

== Cast ==
- Vijayakanth as Raja
- Rupini as Priya
- Jaishankar as Marthandan
- Radha Ravi as Chakravarthy
- Nagesh as Velu, Raja's brother
- Srividya as Lakshmi, Raja's sister-in-law
- Vijayan as Ramanathan
- S. S. Chandran as Venkatachalam
- K. Natraj as David
- Thyagu as David's partner
- Kumarimuthu as Police constable
- Silk Smitha as Guest appearance
- V. Gopalakrishnan (guest appearance)
- Pandiyan as (guest appearance)

== Production ==
Rajinikanth and Thanu decided to do a film together, but it kept getting delayed; Rajinikanth told Thanu to collaborate with a different actor before they return, which became Cooliekkaran starring Vijayakanth. It is the Tamil debut of Rupini. When a song sequence was being filmed, she closed her eyes inadvertently at one point. Though the director Rajasekar did not notice it, Thanu did and wanted it reshot, but Rajasekar refused.

== Soundtrack ==
The music was composed by T. Rajendar, who also wrote the lyrics.

Track listing
| No. | Title | Singer(s) | Length |
|---|---|---|---|
| 1. | "Kuthuvilakkaga" | S. P. Balasubrahmanyam, S. Janaki | 4:22 |
| 2. | "Vechakkuri Thappadhu" | S. P. Balasubrahmanyam | 5:42 |
| 3. | "Bodhai Yethum" | S. P. Balasubrahmanyam, S. Janaki | 4:42 |
| 4. | "Vazhkai Oru" | Malaysia Vasudevan | 4:34 |
| 5. | "Thottathum Thuvandidum" | S. Janaki | 4:37 |
| 6. | "Paazhum Vayirthan" | Malaysia Vasudevan | 5:04 |
| Total length: | | | 29:01 |

== Reception ==
Jayamanmadhan of Kalki criticised the film's predictability, prolonged fight scenes and Rupini's performance but said Vijayakanth did his job well.
