= Naam Pirandha Mann =

- Theatrical release poster
- Directed by: A. Vincent
- Screenplay by: A. Vincent; Vietnam Veedu Sundaram
- Story by: Rajasekhar
- Produced by: S. Rangarajan
- Starring: Sivaji Ganesan; Gemini Ganesan; Nagesh; Kamal Haasan; K. R. Vijaya
- Cinematography: A. Venkat; K. S. Prakash
- Edited by: T. R. Sekhar
- Music by: M. S. Viswanathan
- Production company: Vijaya Arts
- Release date: 7 October 1977
- Running time: 167 minutes
- Country: India
- Language: Tamil

Naam Pirandha Mann (transl. Our Motherland) is a 1977 Indian Tamil-language vigilante action film directed by A. Vincent, who wrote the screenplay with Vietnam Veedu Sundaram. The film stars Sivaji Ganesan, while Gemini Ganesan, Nagesh, Kamal Haasan, K. R. Vijaya, and Fatafat Jayalaxmi play supporting roles. It revolves around a retired vigilante (Sivaji Ganesan) and his delinquent son (Haasan) who clash due to their differing ideologies.

Naam Pirandha Mann is the career debut of Rajasekhar, who wrote the story. The film was released on 7 October 1977 and did not perform well at the box office. Despite this, the story became the basis for the 1996 film Indian, featuring Haasan as both father and son.

== Plot ==
During the British Raj, Santhana Thevar is a rich landlord who lives with his wife Devanayaki and younger sister Valliyammai. He is in the good books of the people and the British. Unknown to his family, he is also Vettaikara Thevar, the masked vigilante leader of a group that terrorises the British colonisers in town and helps the locals.

Joseph, a former soldier, joins Santhanam's group and also works for Vettaikaran's, unaware that both are the same man. Santhanam is hurt during a mission and Joseph rescues him sacrificing himself and is presumed dead. Eventually, the British learn his secret identity and Valliyammai is raped publicly and murdered in an attempt to draw out Santhanam. He comes out in rage, murders the perpetuators and bound by a promise he made to Devanayaki, he surrenders. He escapes his death sentence at the last moment and is freed as India gains independence. He, however, has already been financially ruined.

Years later, the Santhanam family is now reduced to penury and Santhanam's son Ranjith is a bitter young man. He resents the fact that his father's sacrifices have resulted in only misery for the family and that the country is ungrateful to freedom fighters. He also hates the fact that even in poverty, his father refuses pension on account of self-respect. The two clash due to their contrasting world views. Ranjith, at one time, has had enough and takes to crime. In the end, Santhanam finds out that his own son is betraying the country he fought so hard to free and takes his gun again as Vettaikaran. Does the father get killed or does the son?

== Cast ==
- Sivaji Ganesan as Santhana Thevar / Vettaikara Thevar
- Gemini Ganesan as Joseph
- Nagesh as Thavasu
- Kamal Haasan as Ranjith
- K. R. Vijaya as Devanayaki
- Fatafat Jayalaxmi as Valliyammai
- Sathyajith (credited as Shabir)

== Production ==
The story was written by Rajasekhar, in his film career debut. He went to become a successful director in the 1980s. The film began production in April 1976 at Prasad Studios.

== Soundtrack ==
The music was composed by M. S. Viswanathan, with lyrics by Kannadasan.

Song	Singers	Length
"Asai Povadhu Vinnile	S. P. Balasubrahmanyam	4.33
"Thai Padum Pattu Thane"	P. Susheela, Vani Jairam	5.10
Idhaya Thalaiva Nee Sollu "Naan Yaar"	T. M. Soundararajan	4.45
"Annai Bhagavathikku Thannai "	P. Susheela	4.50
"Bharathathil Oru Por"	K. Veeramani	

== Release ==
Naam Pirandha Mann was released on 7 October 1977, and the final length of the film was 4,554.32 metres (14,942.0 ft), down from 4,567.58 metres (14,985.5 ft).
