= Kaakki Sattai =

- Theatrical release poster
- Directed by: Rajasekhar
- Story by: G. M. Kumar; Livingston
- Produced by: G. Thyagarajan; V. Thamizhazhagan
- Starring: Kamal Haasan; Ambika; Maadhavi; Sathyaraj; Rajeev
- Cinematography: V. Ranga
- Edited by: K. R. Krishnan
- Music by: Ilaiyaraaja
- Production company: Sathya Movies
- Release date: 11 April 1985
- Running time: 143 minutes
- Country: India
- Language: Tamil

Kaakki Sattai (transl. Khaki Shirt) is a 1985 Indian Tamil-language action film directed by Rajasekhar, starring Kamal Haasan, Ambika, Maadhavi, Sathyaraj, Rajeev and Thengai Srinivasan. The film, released on 11 April 1985, during the week of Puthandu, became a major box office success. It was loosely remade in Hindi as Guru (1989).

== Plot ==
Murali is a young man who trains very hard to become a police officer. Uma is his neighbour and they fall in love with each other while Uma supports Murali to achieve his goal but he is rejected after the physical test due to not having influence or money.

Angered by the rejection, Murali turns into a local rowdy. He causes trouble in his district and comes to the attention of a notorious smuggler and murderer, Vicky and his partner Anand. After initial conflict between the two, Vicky recruits the rowdy Murali into his gang. Murali becomes his most trusted member. He grows intimate with a girl, Anita, who is looking for personal revenge against Anand.

But soon Vicky's activities time and again, are foiled by the police and he finds out that they have a mole in his gang. Uma spots the changed Murali with Anita and becomes furious and breaks up with him. Then Murali reveals the truth to her. He was not rejected by the police but was recruited by a senior officer to bring down Vicky and Anand's gang. He became a rowdy to get into the gang and is acting as a mole to bring the gang down. They patch things up but Vicky finds out the truth too. In the climax, Anita kills Anand. Vicky kidnaps Uma after killing Anita and when police arrive to arrest him and blackmails Murali to help him escape. After initially helping his escape, Murali rescues Uma and Vicky is killed in the blast.

== Cast ==
- Kamal Haasan as Muralidharan "Murali"
- Sathyaraj as Vicky
- Ambika as Uma
- Maadhavi as Anitha
- Rajeev as Anand
- Thengai Srinivasan as Vicky's assistant
- Bob Christo
- V. Gopalakrishnan as IG
- Kallapetti Singaram as Murali's father
- Y. Vijaya as Singari
- Senthamarai as Bhaskar
- Thavakalai as Murali's friend
- Kanchana

== Soundtrack ==
The soundtrack was composed by Ilaiyaraaja. He finished composing the songs in half-a-day, well before the three-day schedule. The guitar portions of the song "Vaanile Thenila" were performed by Ilaiyaraaja's brother-in-law Sasidharan Muniyandi. Charulatha Mani believes the song "Kanmaniye Pesu" is set in Shivaranjani, a Carnatic raga, while Carnatic musicologist Sundararaman believes it is in Pahadi. "Vaanile Thenila" is set in Chakravakam.

Track listing
No.	Title	Lyrics	Singer(s)	Length
1.	"Kanmaniye Pesu"	Pulamaipithan	S. P. Balasubrahmanyam, S. Janaki	4:35
2.	"Namma Singaari Saraku"	Vaali	S. P. Balasubramanyam	4:28
3.	"Poo Potta Dhavani"	Avinasi Mani	S. P. Balasubramanyam, S. Janaki	4:20
4.	"Vaanile Thenila"	Na. Kamarasan	S. P. Balasubramanyam, S. Janaki	4:33
5.	"Pattu Kannam"	Muthulingam	S. P. Balasubrahmanyam, P. Susheela	4:21
Total length:				22:17

== Critical reception ==
Jayamanmadhan of Kalki praised the performance of Haasan and Sathyaraj, stunt choreography and Ilaiyaraaja's music but felt Rajeev's character was unnecessary. Balumani of Anna praised the acting, music, stunts, dance and direction but felt dialogues criticising police force could have been avoided.

== Re-release ==
A digitally restored version of the film was released on 30 March 2018.

== Bibliography ==
- Sundararaman (2007) [2005]. Raga Chintamani: A Guide to Carnatic Ragas Through Tamil Film Music (2nd ed.). Pichhamal Chintamani. OCLC 295034757.
