= Punnami Naagu (1980 film) =

- Directed by: Rajasekhar
- Screenplay by: Rajasekhar
- Story by: Rama Narayanan
- Produced by: M. Kumaran; M. Saravanan; M. Balasubramaniam
- Starring: Chiranjeevi; Narasimha Raju; Rati Agnihotri; Menaka
- Cinematography: V. Ranga
- Edited by: M. Vellai Swamy
- Music by: K. Chakravarthy
- Production company: AVM Productions
- Release date: 13 June 1980
- Country: India
- Language: Telugu

Punnami Naagu is a 1980 Indian Telugu-language horror drama film directed by Rajasekhar and produced by AVM Productions. The film brought recognition to Chiranjeevi and his first Filmfare nomination. The other leads in the film, including Rati Agnihotri, Narasimha Raju and Padmanabham played important roles. The film was released on 13 June 1980. It is a remake of the director's own Kannada film Hunnimeya Rathriyalli. It also marked the Telugu debut for Malayalam actress, Menaka G. Suresh.

== Plot ==
Naagulu, a snake charmer, falls in love with Poorna, whose adopted brother Ravi is in love with Naagulu's cousin Lakshmi. Naagulu's father has been mixing snake venom into his food since childhood, making Naagulu immune to any snake bite. Every full moon, Naagulu behaves like a cobra and searches for a woman and every woman he meets dies from his poison. On one such full moon, he kills Poorna and Ravi gets suspicious about this, as there are no marks of a snake bite on her body. A young teacher comes to the village and becomes Naagulu's victim. Ravi investigates with the help of film in her still camera and discovers that Naagulu appears as a snake in a photo she took of him. Naagulu's father reveals his secret before dying and Naagulu tries to find a remedy, but it's too late for that. His skin starts peeling off like a snake and Ravi advises him to leave the village before villagers find and kill him. Naagulu prefers death to the life of a snake and commits suicide from a hilltop.

== Cast ==
- Chiranjeevi as Naagulu
- Narasimha Raju as Ravi
- Rati Agnihotri as Lakshmi
- Menaka as Poorna
- Jayamalini as Servant maid and accomplice of Musalayya
- Sumangali
- Padmanabham as Mungisa Musalayya the Snake Charmer
- Mikkilineni as Zamindar
- Dhulipala as Sastry, Temple Priest
- Balakrishna as Mungisa Musalayya's brother-in-law
- Ramadas as Pamula Pappanna

== Production ==
Chiranjeevi agreed to act in the film despite limited availability. Due to this, he would shoot his scenes only in the evenings.
