= Malaiyoor Mambattiyan =

1983 film by Rajasekhar

- Poster
- Directed by: Rajasekhar
- Screenplay by: Rajasekhar
- Story by: Raghavan Thambi
- Produced by: Siva. Ramadoss; W. S. Sivashankar; K. M. Ravi; K. Muthukumaran
- Starring: Thiagarajan; Saritha; Jaishankar; Silk Smitha
- Cinematography: V. Ranga
- Edited by: R. Vittal
- Music by: Ilaiyaraaja
- Production company: Sri Devi Bagavathy Films
- Release date: 1 July 1983
- Running time: 135 minutes
- Country: India
- Language: Tamil

Malaiyoor Mambattiyan (transl. Man with shovel from Malaiyoor) is 1983 Indian Tamil-language vigilante action film directed by Rajasekhar, starring Thiagarajan, Saritha and Silk Smitha. It was released on 1 July 1983. The film became a blockbuster and established Thiagarajan as a star. It was remade in Hindi by the same director as Gangvaa (1984) and in Telugu as Kondaveeti Nagulu (1984). In 2011, Thiagarajan remade the film starring his son Prashanth, titled as Mambattiyan.

== Plot ==
There is a group of youngsters in the village headed by Mambattiyan, who lead life in a forest by robbing the rich and distributing the wealth to the poor.

== Cast ==
- Thiagarajan as Mambattiyan
- Saritha as Kannaathaa
- Jaishankar as DSP Ranjith
- Silk Smitha as Gypsy
- Senthamarai as Landlord Sundaralingam
- Goundamani as Landlord Chinna Pannai
- Jayamalini as Sornam
- Sangili Murugan as Duplicate Mambatiyan
- Muthu Bharathi as Oomai Durai
- Senthil as Bullet
- Jayashree
- Krishnamoorthy as Kovilraj
- S. N. Lakshmi
- Vinod Raj as a police officer
- Master Haja Sheriff as Kottai Paaku

== Production ==
Thiagarajan was inspired to make a film on the bandit Malaiyoor Mambattiyan after he heard a folk song praising Mambattiyan for helping the people in Malaiyoor village and hailing him as a real-life Robin Hood.

== Soundtrack ==
The music was composed by Ilaiyaraaja. The songs "Chinnai Ponnu Selai" and "Kaattu Vazhi" were well received and later reused in its 2011 remake.

Song	Singers	Lyrics	Length
"Aaduthadi"	Malaysia Vasudevan, S. P. Sailaja	Vaali	04:39
"Chinna Ponnu Selai"	Ilaiyaraaja, S. Janaki	Vairamuthu	04:11
"Kaattu Vazhi Pogum"	Ilaiyaraaja	Vairamuthu	03:41
"Vellarikka"	Gangai Amaran, S. P. Sailaja	Gangai Amaran	04:57

== Critical reception ==
Jayamanmadhan of Kalki praised the performances of cast, cinematography, music, stunt choreography and direction. Balumani of Anna praised the acting, cinematography, music, dialogues and direction.
