= Nomu (film) =

- Theatrical release poster
- Directed by: Pattu
- Produced by: M. Murugan; M. Kumaran; M. Saravanan; M. Balasubramanian
- Starring: Rama Krishna; Chandrakala
- Music by: Satyam
- Production company: AVM Productions
- Release date: 15 August 1974
- Country: India
- Language: Telugu

Nomu is a 1974 Indian Telugu-language film directed by Pattu and produced by M. Kumaran, M. Murugan, M. Saravanan and M. Balasubramanian under the banner AVM Productions. It is a remake of the Tamil film Vellikizhamai Viratham. The film stars Rama Krishna, Chandrakala, Sarath Babu, Jayasudha and K. V. Chalam.

== Cast ==
- Rama Krishna as Eeshwar
- Chandrakala as Parvati
- Sarath Babu as Kanaka Rao
- Jayasudha as Lata
- K.V. Chalam as Puli Raju

== Soundtrack ==
- "Kalise Kallalona" — P. Susheela and S. P. Balasubrahmanyam
- "Manase Jathaga Paadindhile" — P. Susheela and S. P. Balasubrahmanyam
- "Nomu Pandinchava" — P. Susheela
- "Andari Daivam Neevanna" — P. Susheela
- "Thaka Thaka Thaka" — S. Janaki
