= Murattu Karangal =

1986 film

- VCD cover
- Directed by: Rajasekhar
- Written by: Rajasekhar
- Produced by: Hem Nag
- Starring: Thiagarajan; Sulakshana
- Cinematography: V. Ranga
- Edited by: R. Vittal; S. B. Mohan
- Music by: Ilaiyaraaja
- Production company: Hem-Nag Films
- Release date: 10 January 1986
- Country: India
- Language: Tamil

Murattu Karangal (transl. Violent Arms) is a 1986 Indian Tamil-language Western film written and directed by Rajasekhar. The film stars Thiagarajan and Sulakshana, with Sathyaraj, Jaishankar, Ravichandran and Bhanu Chander in supporting roles. It was released on 10 January 1986.

== Cast ==
- Thiagarajan as Veeran
- Sathyaraj as Kabali
- Sulakshana as Valli
- Jaishankar as Kaali
- Ravichandran as Muthu
- Bhanu Chander as Maari
- Sivachandran as Rahman
- Karate Mani
- Anumanthu
- Chalapathi Rao
- Senthil
- T. K. S. Natarajan
- Chelladurai
- Master Vimal
- Suvaraj
- Disco Shanthi

== Soundtrack ==
The music was composed by Ilaiyaraaja.

Song	Singers	Lyrics
"Kanni Ponnu"	S. Janaki	Vairamuthu
"Rathiri Paattu"	Gangai Amaran, K. S. Chithra, B. S. Sasirekha, Malaysia Vasudevan	Vaali
"Kaavalukku Saamy"	Ilaiyaraaja	Vaali
"Naan Unnaithane"	K. S. Chithra	Gangai Amaran
"Oru Poongodi"	Vani Jairam	Gangai Amaran

== Reception ==
Jayamanmadhan of Kalki panned the film, saying the cinematography was its only redeeming feature.
