= Paatti Sollai Thattathe =

1988 film by Rajasekhar

- Poster
- Directed by: Rajasekhar
- Written by: Chithralaya Gopu
- Produced by: M. Saravanan; M. Balasubramanian; M. S. Guhan
- Starring: Pandiarajan; Urvashi; Manorama
- Cinematography: V Ranga
- Edited by: R. Vittal; C. Laasni
- Music by: Chandrabose
- Production company: AVM Productions
- Release date: 22 July 1988
- Running time: 148 minutes
- Country: India
- Language: Tamil

Paatti Sollai Thattathe (transl. Do not disobey your grandmother's words) is a 1988 Indian Tamil-language comedy film directed by Rajasekhar, written by Chithralaya Gopu and produced by AVM Productions. The film stars Pandiarajan, Urvashi and Manorama. It was released on 22 July 1988 and became a silver jubilee success. The film was remade in Telugu by the same studio as Baamma Maata Bangaru Baata (1990).

== Plot ==
Kannathaa, an old rich countrywoman of character, as well as her husband, Vadjiran Subbaiya, an old hunter, look forward to the return of Selvam, their unique grandson, whom they raised with love, since the death of his parents. Selvam returns at his home, having ended his higher studies. In the train which returns him, he meets Seetha, also a graduate, who avoids her home, because of a marriage forced with a notorious procurer. Because he chooses to marry not with the one who was intended, he, by the good care of his grandmother, Selvam, exiles himself with Seetha, who has just married him, towards the capital.

The couple meets difficult debuts, because they are obliged to work in the same office, by pretending not to know each other. They have to face a multitude of qui pro quos. Then once reconciled with his grandmother, Selvam and Seetha is obliged to lie him, by presenting him a child who is not theirs. Indeed, Vadjiran Subbaiya who had come see his grandson, well before, leaves Seetha with a child in her arms. The old man deduced that it was theirs. Selvam "thus" "rented", with Anushya, her baby, to keep up appearances. But the young woman turns out to be a big swindler. She exploits the situation of the couple.

== Cast ==
- Manorama as Kannathaa
- Pandiarajan as Selvam
- Urvashi as Seetha
- Silk Smitha as Anushya
- Disco Shanti as
- Kovai Sarala as Leela
- S. S. Chandran as Vadjiran Subbaiya
- Y. G. Mahendran as Criminal lawyer Kid
- Senthil as the sub-inspector
- Anandaraj as the auto-rickshaw driver
- Vennira Aadai Moorthy as Civil lawyer Moorthy

== Production ==
M. Saravanan who initially worked as production manager produced his first film Mamiyar Mechina Marumagal (1959). The film's failure left him upset and he decided to score a successful film in near future on the same subject which eventually became Paatti Sollai Thattathe. The makers initially wanted Gangai Amaran to direct the film which did not work out. Saravanan decided to adapt Pattam Parakudhu written by Chithralaya Gopu after it was rejected by television channels. Pattam Parakudhu was adapted from the 1968 American film The Love Bug. The film featured a Volkswagen Beetle named "Super Car" that was inspired by Herbie, the car featured in The Love Bug.

== Soundtrack ==
The soundtrack was composed by Chandrabose, with lyrics written by Vairamuthu.

Track listing
No.	Title	Singer(s)	Length
1.	"Car Car Super Car"	M. S. Rajeswari	1:35
2.	"Delhikku Raja Analum"	Manorama	4:22
3.	"Patta Padippu Padichu Vantha"	Manorama, Malaysia Vasudevan and chorus	5:30
4.	"Salaam Sadukudu"	Malaysia Vasudevan, S. P. Sailaja and chorus	4:36
5.	"Vannathi Poochi"	S. P. Balasubrahmanyam and K. S. Chithra	4:10
6.	"Vethala Madichi Kodukka Aasaiya"	S. P. Balasubrahmanyam and K. S. Chithra	4:34
7.	"Vethala Madichi Kodukka Aasaiya" (Sad)	S. P. Balasubrahmanyam and K. S. Chithra	4:48
Total length:			29:35

== Release and reception ==
Paatti Sollai Thattathe was released on 22 July 1988, and became a commercial success, celebrating silver jubilee. The car sequence was well received, and brought repeat audiences to theatres. The Indian Express wrote, "While Gopu shows much eagerness to indulge in some naughty lines [..] director Rajasekhar [..] shows thoughtfulness in fashioning his sequences". Jayamanmadhan of Kalki said the film was only worth watching for Manorama. Manorama won the Cinema Express Award for Best Comedy Actress, and B. Nagarajan won the Tamil Nadu State Film Award for Best Art Director. The film was remade by AVM in Telugu as Baamma Maata Bangaru Baata (1990).

== Bibliography ==
- Saravanan, M. (2013) [2005]. AVM 60 Cinema (in Tamil) (3rd ed.). Rajarajan Pathippagam. OCLC 1158347612.
