= Amma (1982 film) =

- DVD cover
- Directed by: Rajasekhar
- Written by: V. C. Guhanathan
- Produced by: M. Balasubramanian
- Starring: Saritha; Pratap Pothen
- Cinematography: M. Kesavan
- Edited by: K. R. Ramalingam
- Music by: Shankar–Ganesh
- Production company: AVM Productions
- Release date: 24 June 1982
- Country: India
- Language: Tamil

Amma (transl. Mother) is a 1982 Indian Tamil-language drama film directed by Rajasekhar, written by V. C. Guhanathan and produced by AVM Productions. The film stars Saritha and Pratap Pothen. It was released on 24 June 1982, and did not perform well at the box office.

== Cast ==
- Saritha
- Pratap Pothen
- Master Vimal
- Dilip
- Thengai Srinivasan
- V. K. Ramasamy
- Rani Padmini

== Production ==
Master Vimal was introduced as a child artist with this film.

== Soundtrack ==
The soundtrack was composed by Shankar–Ganesh and lyrics by Vairamuthu. The song "Mazhaiye Mazhaiye" attained popularity.

Track listing
No.	Title	Singer(s)	Length
1.	"Poo Mugam"	P. Susheela
2.	"Bodhaiyil Pongum"	Malaysia Vasudevan, L. R. Anjali, Manorama
3.	"Mazhaiye Mazhaiye"	S. P. Balasubrahmanyam, S. Janaki
4.	"Ammave Deivam"	P. Susheela

== Release and reception ==
Amma was released on 24 June 1982. Thiraignani of Kalki appreciated the acting of the star cast and Guhanathan's story but panned Ramasamy's humour. The film failed at the box-office.
