= Gangvaa =

- Poster
- Directed by: Rajasekhar
- Screenplay by: Rajasekhar
- Based on: Malaiyoor Mambattiyan (Tamil)(1983)
- Produced by: Dwarakish
- Starring: Rajinikanth; Shabana Azmi
- Music by: Bappi Lahiri
- Release date: 14 September 1984
- Country: India
- Language: Hindi

Gangvaa is a 1984 Indian Hindi-language film directed by Rajasekhar, starring Rajinikanth and Shabana Azmi. It is a remake of Rajasekhar's 1983 Tamil film Malaiyoor Mambattiyan. The film had a successful run of over 50 weeks and more than 100 days at the Bombay Plaza theater.

== Plot ==
The basic injustice at the core of Gangvaa is the way the land owning classes take advantage of ordinary village folk. Early on in the film, a work crew finds a pot full of gold coins and Thakur Mahendra Singh (Amrish Puri) confiscates them to add to his already massive wealth. Gangvaa (Rajnikanth) kills the Zamindar and his goons. Gangvaa puts together a band of men who had suffered under the Zamindar's tyranny. Together they hang out in the wilderness and perform Robin-Hood-esque raids for the sake of vigilante justice. At some point Jamna (Shabana Azmi) encounters Gangvaa and is smitten. Then a village girl accuses Gangvaa of rape, and Jamna is enraged – it is here that she gets down to find the truth. It turns out that the rape was actually perpetrated by a totally different guy named Gangvaa (Raza Murad), and righting this wrong helps Gangvaa win Jamna back, but this makes him a new set of enemies that he spends the rest of the film fleeing from. Also on his tail is a police inspector (Suresh Oberoi), who cannot allow vigilante activities in his district, irrespective of the intention.

== Cast ==
- Rajinikanth as Gangadin "Gangvaa"
- Shabana Azmi as Jamna
- Sarika as Champa
- Suresh Oberoi as DSP Satish Bansal
- Raza Murad as Fake Gangvaa
- Kader Khan as Chhote Thakur
- Amrish Puri as Thakur Mahendra Singh
- Mazhar Khan as Abdullah
- Viju Khote as Bheema
- Shubha Khote as Jamna's Foster Mother
- Arun Bakshi as Jamna's Fiancée
- Chandrashekhar as Jaishankar
- Dulari
- Ali as Naitji

== Music ==
The music was composed by Bappi Lahiri.

Song	Singer
"Angaara Hoon Main, Tu Komal Kali, Kyun Tu Mujhe Pyar Karne Chali"	Kishore Kumar, Asha Bhosle
"O Jaanam Jaanam Jaanam"	Asha Bhosle
"Tanke Khadi Hai, Kya Phooljhadi Hai, Dil Mein Mere Gad Gayi"	Asha Bhosle, Bappi Lahiri
"Gangvaa Gangvaa Gangvaa"	Bappi Lahiri
