= Velum Mayilum Thunai =

- DVD cover
- Directed by: Ra. Sankaran
- Written by: Rajasekhar (dialogues)
- Screenplay by: Ra. Sankaran
- Story by: Rama Narayanan
- Produced by: Rama Narayanan; Vijayalakshmi Subramaniyam
- Starring: M. R. Radha
- Cinematography: N. K. Viswanathan
- Edited by: M. Vellaisamy
- Music by: Shankar–Ganesh
- Production company: Sri Devi Priya Films
- Release date: 23 March 1979
- Country: India
- Language: Tamil

Velum Mayilum Thunai (/veɪlum/ transl. Succour of Spear and Peacock) is a 1979 Indian Tamil-language devotional film directed and written by Ra. Sankaran with dialogue by Rajasekhar. The film stars M. R. Radha in dual roles and Baby Sudha. It was released on 23 March 1979.

== Plot ==
Velayudham is a non-believer in god while his own son Saravanan opposes him in topic on divine power.

== Cast ==
- M. R. Radha as Velayudham and Thanikachalam
- Baby Sudha as Saravanan
- Kannadasan as Kannadasan (Guest appearance)
- Major Sundarrajan as Prohit
- M. N. Rajam as Prohit's Wife
- Neelu as Advocate Appalachari
- Sachu as Poongkodi
- Vijaya Chandrika as Panchali
- I. S. R. as Arjunan
- Jai Ganesh as Kali, Thief
- Radhika as Valli
- S. V. Ramadas as Elephant driver
- Sripriya as Meenakshi, The dumb girl
- Vijayakumar as Sundaresan, Biscope
- Manorama as Manohari
- Typist Gopu as Ekambaram
- Cho as Manohari's husband

== Soundtrack ==
The music was composed by Shankar–Ganesh and the lyrics were written by Kannadasan and Vaali.

Track listing
No.	Title	Lyrics	Singer(s)	Length
1.	"Aathoram Neeyee Ganapathy"	Kannadasan	Sirkazhi Govindarajan Bangalore Ramani Ammal
2.	"Kanthane Varuga"	Kannadasan	S. P. Balasubrahmanyam	4:30
3.	"Pandia Mannanin Rajakumari"	Vaali	Vani Jairam	4:36
4.	"Velum Mayilum Thunai"		K. Veeramani	4:06

== Reception ==
P. S. M. of Kalki praised Ra. Sankaran for providing devotional offering for devotees.
