= Hunnimeya Rathriyalli =

- VCD cover
- Directed by: Rajasekhar
- Written by: Narendra Babu (dialogues)
- Screenplay by: Rajasekhar
- Story by: Rajasekhar
- Produced by: R. M. Subramanyam; Radha Narayanan; Jalaja Shanmugam
- Starring: Lokesh; Ashok; Roopa Chakravarthi; M. S. Vasantha
- Cinematography: T. V. Balu; Lokayya
- Edited by: Vellaicchami
- Music by: Gangai Amaran
- Production company: Sri Devipriya Creations
- Release date: 6 February 1980
- Running time: 107 minutes
- Country: India
- Language: Kannada

Hunnimeya Rathriyalli ( transl. On a full moon night) is a 1980 Indian Kannada-language film, directed by Rajasekhar in his directoral debut and produced by R. M. Subramanyam, Radha Narayanan and Jalaja Shanmugam. The film stars Lokesh, Ashok, Roopa Chakravarthi and M. S. Vasantha. The film was remade in Tamil as Pournami Nilavil (1980), in Telugu as Punnami Naagu (1980), and in Hindi as Jeene Ki Arzoo (1981).

== Cast ==
- Lokesh
- Ashok
- Roopa Chakravarthy
- M. S. Vasantha
- Musuri Krishnamurthy
- S. V. Ramadas
- Suryakumar
- Comedian Guggu
- Babu
- Ramakrishna
- Vijayababu in Guest Appearance
- Sudha Sindhoor
- Nalini
- Saroja
- Lavanya
- Vijayalakshmi
- Rani
- Hamsarani
- Master Shashi
