= Maaveeran (1986 film) =

1986 film by Rajasekhar

- Theatrical release poster
- Directed by: Rajasekhar
- Screenplay by: Rajasekhar
- Story by: Prayag Raaj
- Produced by: G. Hanumantha Rao
- Starring: Rajinikanth; Ambika; Jaishankar
- Cinematography: V. Ranga
- Edited by: Kothagiri Gopalrao
- Music by: Ilaiyaraaja
- Production company: Padmalaya Studios
- Distributed by: R. K. Productions
- Release date: 1 November 1986
- Running time: 157 minutes
- Country: India
- Language: Tamil

Maaveeran (transl. Great Warrior) is a 1986 Indian Tamil-language action film directed by Rajasekhar. A remake of the 1985 Hindi film Mard, it stars Rajinikanth, Ambika and Jaishankar. The film revolves around a rude princess, who falls in love with a simpleton after initially being hostile towards him.

Maaveeran was the first in Tamil film to be shot in 70 mm film format and have a six-track stereophonic sound. It was released on 1 November 1986, Diwali day, and became a critical and commercial failure.

== Cast ==
- Rajinikanth as Raja (Maaveeran)
- Ambika as Rekha
- Jaishankar as Harry
- Sujatha as Raja's mother
- Vijayakumar as Joe
- Anand Babu as a dancer
- Dara Singh as Sethupathi
- C. R. Vijayakumari as Gowri
- Nagesh as Raja's stepfather
- Thengai Srinivasan as Drama head (guest appearance)
- Sunitha as Helina
- Vittal Prasad as Vicky

== Production ==
Maaveeran is a remake of the 1985 Hindi film Mard, and even used some footage from that film. It was shot in the expensive 70 mm film format, becoming the first Tamil film to do so. Sivaji Ganesan was initially attached to star in the film, but later opted out due to other commitments. The film was prominently shot in Mysore, including the Lalitha Mahal. A fight sequence was shot in a mirror set at YMCA Swimming pool, Saidapet.

== Soundtrack ==
The music was composed by Ilaiyaraaja. He composed a six-track stereophonic sound, making Maaveeran the first film to achieve this feat.

| Song | Singers | Lyrics | Length |
|---|---|---|---|
| "Ammaa Ammaa" | Malaysia Vasudevan | Vaali | 04:22 |
| "Ezhugave" | Malaysia Vasudevan | Vairamuthu | 04:28 |
| "Hey Maina" | Malaysia Vasudevan, K. S. Chithra | Gangai Amaran | 04:26 |
| "Nee Koduththatha" | Malaysia Vasudevan, K. S. Chithra | Vaali | 07:01 |
| "Sokku Podi" | Malaysia Vasudevan, K. S. Chithra | Gangai Amaran | 04:37 |
| "Vaangada Vaanga" | Malaysia Vasudevan | Gangai Amaran | 04:23 |

== Release and reception ==
Maaveeran was released on 1 November 1986, Diwali day, and clashed with Punnagai Mannan, Aruvadai Naal and Palaivana Rojakkal. The Indian Express wrote on 7 November 1986, "The film makes its way through sadism and violence, damning sentiment, religion and righteousness by its downright exploitativeness. Its corny cliches are almost sickening". Jayamanmadhan (a duo) of Kalki wrote that even though couple of songs are average, the cinematography was a consolation. The duo noted that despite using new techniques for fight scenes, because of a plot which confuses and goes around aimlessly, it has almost become like a vomit after delicious products and pouring so much of money. The film emerged a critical and commercial failure; according to Rajinikanth's biographer Naman Ramachandran, the combination of Punnagai Mannan's director K. Balachander, lead actor Kamal Haasan, lead actress Revathi and the soundtrack by Ilaiyaraaja "proved too much for Maaveeran, and its audience was restricted to hard-core Rajinikanth fans".

== Bibliography ==
- Ramachandran, Naman (2012). Rajinikanth: The Definitive Biography. New Delhi: Penguin Books. ISBN 978-81-8475-796-5.
