= Alli Arjuna (1935 film) =

- Poster
- Directed by: A. V. Meiyappan
- Based on: Alli Arjuna (play)
- Produced by: A. V. Meiyappan
- Starring: K. S. Ananthanarayana Iyer; K. R. Kanthimathi Bai
- Production company: Saraswathi Sound Productions
- Release date: 1935
- Country: India
- Language: Tamil

Alli Arjuna is a 1935 Indian Tamil-language Hindu mythological film produced and directed by A. V. Meiyappan in his debut. It is based on the play of the same name, revolving around Arjuna from the Hindu epic Mahabharata. The film stars K. S. Ananthanarayana Iyer and K. R. Kanthimathi Bai, and became a box-office bomb.

== Cast ==
- K. S. Ananthanarayana Iyer
- K. R. Kanthimathi Bai

== Production ==
In 1934, A. V. Meiyappan established Saraswathi Sound Productions. The debut venture of this company would be launched a year later, titled Alli Arjuna, an adaptation of the play of the same name that revolved around Arjuna from the Hindu epic Mahabharata. Theatre actors K. S. Ananthanarayana Iyer and K. R. Kanthimathi Bai were cast as the lead pair. Due to lack of proper studio facilities in Madras to shoot sound films, Alli Arjuna had to be shot at the Calcutta-based New Theatres Studios.

== Soundtrack ==
Although Tamil films in the early 1930s had multiple songs, some having as many as 40 or 50, Meiyappan minimised the usage of songs in Alli Arjuna as he felt "a film could be made with new faces or less expensive artistes and with lesser number of songs".

== Release and reception ==
Alli Arjuna was released in 1935 and became a box-office bomb. Historian Randor Guy attributed the film's failure to various reasons, including the cast performances and the high budget. The losses were estimated as high as ₹80,000 (equivalent to ₹28 million or US$290,000 in 2023), with Guy saying the travel expenses of going to Calcutta added to the budget.
