= Vellai Pura Ondru =

- Theatrical release poster
- Directed by: Gangai Amaran
- Written by: A. L. Narayanan (dialogues)
- Story by: Bhishetty Lakshmana Rao
- Produced by: AVM Kumaran; Padma Kumaran; AVM K. Shanmugam
- Starring: Vijayakanth; Sujatha
- Cinematography: Sabapathy
- Edited by: B. Lenin
- Music by: Ilaiyaraaja
- Production company: Bhuvaneshwari Movies
- Distributed by: Filmco
- Release date: 13 April 1984
- Country: India
- Language: Tamil

Vellai Pura Ondru (transl. A white dove) is a 1984 Indian Tamil-language film directed by Gangai Amaran, starring Vijayakanth and Sujatha. It was released on 13 April 1984, and failed at the box office. The film's title is derived from a song from Pudukavithai (1982).

== Cast ==
Male cast

- Vijayakanth as Jeeva
- Suresh as Suresh
- Sivachandran
- V. K. Ramasamy
- Sarath Babu
- Shanmugasundaram
- Sangili Murugan
- Jaishankar

Female cast

- Sujatha
- Urvashi as Padma
- Nalini as Devi
- Silk Smitha
- Manorama
- Bindu Ghosh
- V. Suguna

== Production ==
The film's title is derived from a song from Pudukavithai (1982). Radha was originally announced as a pair to Vijayakanth.

== Themes ==
The film has Vijayakanth wielding a chain with a hammer and sickle star dollar, reflecting the actor's passion for communism in the 1980s.

== Soundtrack ==
The music was composed by Ilaiyaraaja. The song "Ilam Kadhal Veenai Isai Padum" is set in Mayamalavagowla, a Carnatic raga.

Track listing
No.	Title	Lyrics	Singer(s)	Length
1.	"Dhinasari Kalarai Parthathale"	Gangai Amaran	S. P. Balasubrahmanyam, S. Janaki	4:07
2.	"Thenuruthe Aasaiyo Neeluthe"	Na. Kamarasan	S. Janaki	4:36
3.	"Ilam Kadhal Veenai Isai Padum"	Vaali	Malaysia Vasudevan, S. Janaki	5:35
4.	"Ponnuna Ponnu Yemmamperiya"	Muthulingam	Prakash, S. Janaki	4:27
Total length:				18:45

== Release and reception ==
Vellai Pura Ondru was released on 13 April 1984, and distributed by Filmco. Jayamanmadhan of Kalki praised the music, stunts and humour but felt the actors had performed disinterested. Balumani of Anna also appreciated the music and stunts and direction. The film failed at the box office.
