= Rama Narayanan =

Indian film director and film producer

Kalaimamani Rama Narayanan ex-MLA
- Narayanan in 2014
- Born: 3 April 1949; Karaikudi, Madras Province, Dominion of India (now Tamil Nadu, India)
- Died: 22 June 2014 (aged 65); Singapore
- Occupations: Film director; Film producer
- Years active: 1981–2013
- Spouse: Radha
- Children: 2

Rama Narayanan (3 April 1949 – 22 June 2014) was an Indian film director, producer and politician. In the 1980s, he was known as a director who specialized in shooting commercial films in which animals played vital roles, while in the 1990s, several of his films were based on Hindu devotional subjects. Having directed over 100 films, he was renowned for his quick completion of films well within budget constraints.

== Career ==
Narayanan came to Chennai intending to become a songwriter, but he became a dialogue writer for films. He and his friend M. A. Khaja started to write dialogues together under the pen name Ram-Rahim.

In 1976, Narayanan wrote his first story, screenplay and dialogue for the film Aasai Arubadhu Naal. He produced his first film Meenakshi Kungumam in 1977 and directed his first film Sumai in 1981. He also wrote the story for Chiranjeevi's film Punnami Naagu. His 50th film was Veeran Veluthambi, for which M. Karunanidhi wrote the story and dialogue. His 100th film was Thirupathi Ezhumalai Venkatesa.

In the 2010s, he finished the making of a comedy film titled Siva Poojaiyil Karadi with Shiva and Udhayathara starring, but the film did not have a theatrical release.

== Filmography ==
=== As director ===
Year	Film	Language	Notes
1981	Sumai	Tamil	Debut as Director
1981	Sivappu Malli	Tamil	
1981	Pattam Parakattum	Tamil	
1982	Ilanjodigal	Tamil	
1982	Chinnan Chirusugal	Tamil	
1982	Theeradha Vilaiyattu Pillai	Tamil	
1982	Kanne Radha	Tamil	
1982	Sivantha Kangal	Tamil	
1982	Attaku Tagga Alludu	Telugu	
1983	Soorakottai Singakutti	Tamil	
1983	Idhu Enga Nadu	Tamil	
1983	Manaivi Solle Manthiram	Tamil	
1983	Seerum Singangal	Tamil	
1984	Shabash	Tamil	
1984	Kadamai	Tamil	
1984	Kaval Kaidhigal	Tamil	
1984	Vengayin Maindhan	Tamil	
1984	Manmatha Rajakkal	Tamil	
1984	Sattathai Thiruthungal	Tamil	
1984	Maaman Machan	Tamil	
1984	Vai Pandal	Tamil	
1984	Pei Veedu	Tamil	
1984	Thiruttu Rajakkal	Tamil	
1984	Nandri	Tamil	
1984	Thangamadi Thangam	Tamil	
1985	Veeran	Tamil	
1985	Kutravaaligal	Tamil	
1985	Chain Jayapal	Tamil	
1985	Chilipi Yavvanam	Telugu	
1985	Ilamai	Tamil	
1985	Veettukari	Tamil	
1985	Thandanai	Tamil	
1985	Vesham	Tamil	
1985	Dayyala Meda	Telugu	
1985	Sigappu Nila	Tamil	
1985	Urimai	Tamil	
1985	Engal Kural	Tamil	
1985	Inspector Lakshmi	Telugu	
1985	Ragasiyam	Tamil	
1985	Vetrikani	Tamil	
1985	Sivappu Kili	Tamil	
1986	Karimedu Karuvayan	Tamil	
1986	Jyothi Malar	Tamil	
1986	Kagitha Odam	Tamil	
1986	Choru	Tamil	
1986	Mamiyaargal Jaagrathai	Tamil	
1986	Naga Devatha	Telugu	
1986	Adutha Veedu	Tamil	
1987	Nilavai Kayil Pudichen	Tamil	
1987	Megam Karuththirukku	Tamil	
1987	Veeran Veluthambi	Tamil	
1987	Nalla Pambu	Tamil	
1988	Manaivi Oru Manthiri	Tamil	
1988	Makkal Aanaiyittal	Tamil	
1988	Neruppu Nila	Tamil	
1988	Sahadevan Mahadevan	Tamil	
1989	Thangamani Rangamani	Tamil	
1989	Thangamana Purushan	Tamil	
1989	Mananthal Mahadevan	Tamil	
1990	Aadi Velli	Tamil	
1990	Sathan Sollai Thattathe	Tamil	
1990	Durga	Tamil	
1990	Vaaliba Vilayattu	Tamil	
1990	Shakthi Parasakthi	Tamil	
1990	Avadellam Pennaley	Tamil	
1991	Thai Poosam	Tamil	
1991	Sendhoora Devi	Tamil	
1991	Eeswari	Tamil	
1991	Aadi Viratham	Tamil	
1991	Bhairavi	Kannada	
1992	Sivashankari	Tamil	
1992	Madha Komadha	Tamil	
1992	Purushan Enakku Arasan	Tamil	
1992	Devar Veettu Ponnu	Tamil	
1992	Sambhavi	Kannada	
1992	Naga Bala	Telugu	
1992	Gauravamma	Telugu	
1993	Sivarathiri	Tamil	
1993	Dakshayini	Kannada	
1994	Vaanga Partner Vaanga	Tamil	
1994	Bhuvaneshwari	Kannada	
1994	Naga Jyoti	Oriya	
1996	Thirumbi Paar	Tamil	
1997	Nattupura Nayagan	Tamil	
1998	Jagadeeshwari	Kannada	
1999	Maaya	Tamil	
1999	Jayasoorya	Kannada	
1999	Thirupathi Ezhumalai Venkatesa	Tamil	100th Film
2000	Raja Kaliamman	Tamil	
2000	Kandha Kadamba Kathir Vela	Tamil	
2000	Kuberan	Tamil	
2000	Palayathu Amman	Tamil	
2001	Nageswari	Tamil	
2001	Viswanathan Ramamoorthy	Tamil	
2001	Kottai Mariamman	Tamil	
2002	Shakalaka Baby	Tamil	
2003	Annai Kaligambal	Tamil	
2003	Sri Kalikamba	Kannada	
2005	Mannin Maindhan	Tamil	
2010	Kutti Pisasu	Tamil	
2010	Bombat Car	Kannada	
2010	Cara Majaka	Telugu	
2012	Kalpana	Kannada	
2012	Cinta Beruang	Malay	
2013	Arya Surya	Tamil	
2015	Billa	Kannada	

=== As producer ===
Year	Title	Notes
1977	Meenakshi Kungumam	produced under the Sri Devipriya Films banner
1979	Velum Mayilum Thunai	produced under the Sri Devipriya Films banner
1979	Oru Vidukadhai Oru Thodarkadhai	produced under the Sri Devipriya Films banner
1980	Pournami Nilavil	
1985	Naagam	
1988	Kazhugumalai Kallan	
1994	Pudhupatti Ponnuthaayi	
2002	Koundar Veettu Mappillai	produced under the Sri Devipriya Films banner
2005	Mannin Maindhan	
2010	Kutti Pisasu	produced under the Sri Thenandal Films banner
2013	Kanna Laddu Thinna Aasaiya	produced under the Sri Thenandal Films banner
2013	Karimedu	produced under the Sri Thenandal Films banner
2013	Arya Surya	produced under the Sri Thenandal Films banner

=== As writer only ===
Year	Film	Writer	Language	Notes
1976	Aasai Arubathu Naal	Story	Tamil	Co-written with M. A. Khaja as Ram-Rahim
1977	Durgadevi	Story	Tamil	Co-written with M. A. Khaja as Ram-Rahim
1977	Raghupathi Raghavan Rajaram	Story	Tamil	Co-written with M. A. Khaja as Ram-Rahim
1979	Manthoppu Kiliye	Story	Tamil	Co-written with M. A. Khaja as Ram-Rahim
1980	Theru Vilakku	Story	Tamil	Co-written with M. A. Khaja as Ram-Rahim
1980	Punnami Naagu	Story	Telugu	Remake of the Kannada film Hunnimeya Rathriyalli originally written by Rajasekhar
1985	Maruthi	Supervision	Tamil	Also provided direction supervision
1988	Thenpandi Seemaiyile	Yes	Tamil	
1990	Manaivi Oru Manickam	Yes	Tamil	

== Politics and other posts ==
Narayanan was elected to the Tamil Nadu Legislative Assembly from Karaikudi constituency in 1989.

He became the chairman of Tamil Nadu Eyal Isai Nataka Manram in late-1996.

He has also headed the Tamil Film Producers Council (TFPC) for three consecutive elections, before resigning in 2011.

== Awards and recognition ==
He has received the Kalaimamani award of the Government of Tamil Nadu.

== Death ==
Rama Narayanan died on 22 June 2014 at a Singapore hospital due to kidney-related ailments.
