= Vettaikaaran (2009 film) =

2009 Indian Tamil-language action drama film by B. Babusivan

- Theatrical poster
- Directed by: B. Babusivan
- Written by: B. Babusivan
- Produced by: M. Balasubramanian; Gurunath Meiyappan
- Starring: Vijay; Anushka
- Cinematography: S. Gopinath
- Edited by: V. T. Vijayan
- Music by: Vijay Antony
- Production company: AVM Productions & Entertainment
- Distributed by: Sun Pictures (India); Ayngaran International (UK); Thameens (Kerala); FiveStar (Malaysia); Sri Sai Ganesh Productions (Andhra Pradesh)
- Release date: 18 December 2009
- Running time: 175 minutes
- Country: India
- Language: Tamil

Vettaikaaran (transl. Hunter) is a 2009 Indian Tamil-language action film directed by debutant B. Babusivan and produced by AVM Productions. The film stars Vijay and Anushka Shetty in the lead roles, while Srihari, Salim Ghouse, Sayaji Shinde and Ravi Shankar appear in supporting roles. Gopinath handled the cinematography while V. T. Vijayan was the film's editor. This was Vijay's first film with AVM Productions and the only film B. Babusivan ever directed.

Vettaikkaran received mixed reviews from critics, but was a commercial success and completed a 100-day theatrical run. The film has collected $1,399,911 at the overseas box office.

== Plot ==
Ravi is a youngster from Thoothukudi who aspires to become a police officer like his role model, Encounter Specialist DCP Devaraj IPS. After completing his PUC, he joins a college in Chennai and also earns a living by driving an auto rickshaw. During the course, he meets Suseela, an IT professional and falls in love with her. Although Suseela rejects Ravi's advances at first, with the help of her grandmother, Ravi succeeds in winning Suseela's heart. Meanwhile, Chella is a gangster and womanizer, meets Ravi's friend Uma in a public place, where she is taking donations for some cause, and immediately develops an attraction to her. When Uma asks Chella to contribute money, he willingly donates by inserting a rupee note in her jacket. Uma feels ashamed and tells her father what happened.

Ravi finds out what happened to Uma through her father, he comes to her defence and beats up Chella, hospitalizing him. His troubles start from there as Chella's father, a powerful don named Vedanayagam, with the help of his right-hand man, a corrupt police officer Kattabomman, begins to create havoc in Ravi's life. Ravi is soon thrown into jail on a false case of drug smuggling and is expelled from college. Suseela is willing to help him where she goes to Devaraj and pleads with him to help Ravi, but Devaraj initially refuses to help as his entire family had died at the hands of Vedanayagam and he himself was blinded by him because he had taken action against him and his gang. However, with the help of his people known in the police department, He saves Ravi from being killed in a fake encounter led by Kattabomman. It is at this stage that Ravi takes up a new persona called "Police" Ravi to clean up the illegal activities of Vedanayagam and instill hope in the public, something that Devaraj was unable to do.

In the process, however, Vedanayagam kills Ravi's close friend Sugu, prompting Ravi to kill Chella in retribution. Vedanayagam decides to become a minister, in order to prevent Ravi from targeting him and his activities. As Ravi finally plans to kill the newly sworn in minister Vedanayagam, The police arrive to arrest him. However, Ravi sees Devaraj in the crowd and announces Vedanayagam's location to him just as he is being arrested, allowing Devaraj to assassinate Vedanayagam, effectively avenging his family's death. Devaraj is reinstated into the police force and offers to make Ravi a police officer. However, Ravi refuses, stating that he has found the police officer within himself and that is all he needs to succeed in life.

== Cast ==
- Vijay as "Police" Ravi
- Anushka Shetty as Susheela aka Susi
- Srihari as ACP K. Devaraj IPS, Ravi's role model
- Salim Ghouse as Vedanayagam
- Sayaji Shinde as ACP Kattabomman, a corrupt police officer
- Ravi Shankar as Chella Vedanayagam, Vedanayagam's son
- Sanchita Padukone as Uma, Ravi's friend
- Sukumari as Susheela's grandmother
- Sathyan as Sugu, Ravi's close friend
- V. M. C. Haneefa as Complex Owner
- Srinath as P. Valayapathi, Ravi's friend
- Delhi Ganesh as Ravi's father
- Jeeva as Sandi
- Manobala as Reporter
- Manikka Vinayagam as Uma's father
- Bala Singh as Rajasekhar
- Kalairani
- Mounica as Shanthi
- Ravi Prakash as Police Commissioner of Chennai
- Lakshmi Ramakrishnan as Ravi's mother
- Raviraj
- Jayashree as Chella's wife
- B. Jayalakshmi as Jaanu
- Munnar Ramesh as Police constable
- Chelladurai as Tea master
- Maran as Ravi's friend
- Imman Annachi as Shanthi's relative (uncredited)

Special appearances

- Kimu Gopal as IAS (in the song "Puli Urumudhu")
- Jason Sanjay (in the song "Naan Adicha")
- Ashok Raja (in the song "Puli Urumudhu")

== Production ==
=== Development ===
During the filming of Kuruvi, B. Babusivan served as one of his assistant directors in the film and wrote the dialogues. Sivan was later prompted to begin his maiden directorial venture with Vijay in the lead role. He was eventually chosen as the director for the next feature film to be produced by AVM Productions. The project was originally titled as Police Ravi but in August 2008 it was re-titled as Vettaikkaaran, taken from the 1964 film of the same name starring M. G. Ramachandran.

Vettaikaran was formally launched the next month. The film's director Babusivan, producers M. Balasubramaniam and B. Gurunath Meyyappan, Vijay and his wife, Vijay Antony, S. A. Chandrasekhar and director Dharani were present at the film's inauguration.

=== Casting ===
Perarasu and Hari were mentioned for the project, but AVM Productions chose B. Babusivan as the director of the film. Anushka Shetty was selected as lead female role opposite to Vijay for the first time. Cinematographer Gopinath was chosen to be the lead cameraman in the film after Ravi Varman was dropped from the film. V. T. Vijayan was signed as the film's editor.

=== Filming ===
Vijay experimented with his look in two songs. In "Karigalan", the left half of his body is a man where the right half is a female. The song is also notable for featuring Vijay without a moustache in his career for the first time; Vijay would eventually portray a full clean-shaven character in The Greatest of All Time (2024). The look in Karigalan was suggested by Dinesh after he watched Aamir Khan in a Tata Sky advertisement. In "Oru Chinna Thamarai", Vijay sports a long hair wig. Regarding his long hair look, Vijay reveals that he "always wanted to" try long hair.

== Soundtrack ==
Vettaikaaran

Soundtrack album by Vijay Antony
- Released: 23 September 2009
- Recorded: Audiophiles
- Genre: Feature film soundtrack
- Length: 26:33
- Label: Sony Music

Vijay Antony chronology
Mahatma (2009)	Vettaikaaran (2009)	Rasikkum Seemane (2010)

Soundtrack was composed by Vijay Antony and met with a positive response. The song "Naan Adicha" was partially copied from the Marathi song "Ye Go Ye Ye Maina" from the film Jatra, composed by Ajay-Atul.

No.	Title	Lyrics	Singer(s)	Length
1.	"Naan Adicha"	Kabilan	Shankar Mahadevan, Jason Sanjay (Uncredited)	4:35
2.	"Karigalan"	Kabilan	Suchith Suresan, Sangeetha Rajeshwaran	4:15
3.	"Puli Urumudhu"	Kabilan	Ananthu, Mahesh Vinayakram	4:15
4.	"Chinna Thamarai"	Viveka	Krish, Dinesh Kanagaratnam, Bonekilla, Suchitra	4:33
5.	"Uchimandai"	Annamalai	Krishna Iyer, Shoba Chandrasekhar, Charulatha Mani, Shakthisree Gopalan	4:12
Total length:				24:07

== Release ==
=== Critical reception ===
Sify gave the film a 4/5 star rating, and wrote the "major plus for the movie are the five peppy songs tuned by Vijay Antony which are choreographed well ... The action scenes by Kanal Kannan are superbly choreographed. Gopinath’s camera is slick and editing is fast-paced". The Times of India gave 3.5 stars out of 5 criticising Babusivan for failing to properly tell the story in the second half. Ananda Vikatan rated the film 38 out of 100.

== Accolades ==
Award	Category	Recipient	Result
Vijay Awards	Favourite Hero	Vijay	Won
Vijay Awards	Favourite Heroine	Anushka	Won
Vijay Awards	Favourite Film	Vettaikaran	Nominated
Vijay Awards	Favourite Song	"Oru Chinna Thamarai"	Won
Vijay Awards	Best Music Director	Vijay Antony	Nominated
Vijay Awards	Best Villain	Salim Ghouse	Nominated
Vijay Awards	Best Male Playback Singer	Krish	Nominated
Vijay Awards	Best Lyricist	Kabilan	Nominated
Vijay Awards	Best Stunt Director	Kanal Kannan	Nominated
Filmfare Awards South
Filmfare Awards South	Best Lyricist	Kabilan ("Karikaalan")	Nominated
Filmfare Awards South	Best Lyricist	Vivega (Oru Chinna Thamarai)	Nominated
Filmfare Awards South	Best Male Playback Singer	Krish ("Oru Chinna Thamarai")	Nominated
Filmfare Awards South	Best Female Playback Singer	Suchitra ("Oru Chinna Thamarai")	Nominated
Edison Awards	Best Male Playback Singer	Krish ("Oru Chinna Thamarai")	Won
