= B. Babusivan =

Indian film director and screenwriter (1964–2020)

- Born: November 4, 1964; Chennai, Madras State, India
- Died: 16 September 2020 (aged 55)
- Occupations: Film director, Screenwriter
- Years active: 2008-2020

B. Babusivan (4 November 1964 - 16 September 2020) was an Indian film director and screenwriter of Tamil films. He initially began his career as an assistant director to film director Dharani. In 2009, Babusivan became independent director in Vettaikaaran (2009). After a long interval in 2019, B. Babusivan made his re-entry in Tamil serials taking over Rasaathi, a Sun TV serial.

Babusivan died on September 16, 2020 due to kidney and liver failure.

== Filmography ==
Films

Year	Film	Credited as		Notes
Year	Film	Director	Writer	Notes
2008	Kuruvi	No	Dialogues	
2009	Vettaikkaran	Yes	Yes	
2017	Bairavaa	No	Story	Credited in thanks card

Serials

Year	Serial	Cast	Notes
2019–2020	Rasaathi	Pavani Reddy, Devayani, Baladitya, Vichithra	Took over after director Rajkapoor left the series (28 Episodes)
2026–present	Moondru Mudichu	Niyaz Khan, Preethi Sanjiv, Dharshna Sripal Golecha, Swathi Konde	Took over after director Nanthan C. Muthiah left the series (500 Episodes)
