= Rajasekhar (director) =

Indian film director and screenwriter

- Born: Subramanian; Nattarasankottai, Karaikudi, Tamilnadu
- Occupations: Director, screenwriter
- Years active: 1977–1991
- Children: 2

Subramanian (??? – 24 April 1991), known professionally as Rajasekhar (/rɑːdʒəseɪkər/) was an Indian film director and screenwriter who was active mainly in Tamil cinema during the 1980s. He also directed films in Telugu, Kannada and Hindi.

== Early life and career ==
Rajasekhar was born as Subramanian in Nattarasankottai in the then Ramanathapuram district and was a Bachelor of Science graduate. Prior to his entry in films, he was working in government department and few people encouraged him to write scripts as they felt he had a creator in him he then left the job and he wrote story for the 1977 release Naam Pirandha Mann. It was Rajinikanth who gave Subramanian the name Rajasekhar. He worked as assistant director to M. A. Kaja and Rama Narayanan. He made his directorial debut with Hunnimeya Rathriyalli in Kannada based on their story while Kanneer Pookkal was his debut in Tamil.

Rajasekhar frequently collaborated with Rajinikanth and Kamal Haasan. With the former he directed Gangvaa, Thambikku Entha Ooru, Padikkadavan, Maaveeran Maapillai and Dharma Durai; with the latter he directed Kaakki Sattai and Vikram. Rajasekhar's other major credits include Malaiyoor Mambattiyan, Eetti, Cooliekkaran, Paatti Sollai Thattathe and its Telugu remake Baamma Maata Bangaru Baata.

== Filmography ==
Films directed

Year	Film	Language
1980	Hunnimeya Rathriyalli	Kannada
1981	Punnami Naagu	Telugu
1981	Kanneer Pookkal	Tamil
1981	Jeene Ki Arzoo	Hindi
1982	Amma	Tamil
1983	Malaiyoor Mambattiyan	Tamil
1984	Thambikku Entha Ooru	Tamil
1984	Gangvaa	Hindi
1985	Eetti	Tamil
1985	Padikkadavan	Tamil
1985	Kaakki Sattai	Tamil
1986	Vikram	Tamil
1986	Kanmaniye Pesu	Tamil
1986	Murattu Karangal	Tamil
1986	Kalamellam Unn Madiyil	Tamil
1986	Lakshmi Vandhachu	Tamil
1986	Maaveeran	Tamil
1987	Cooliekkaran	Tamil
1988	Kazhugumalai Kallan	Tamil
1988	Paatti Sollai Thattathe	Tamil
1989	Baamma Maata Bangaru Baata	Telugu
1989	Karunguyil Kundram	Tamil
1989	Mappillai	Tamil
1990	Pudhu Varisu	Tamil
1991	Dharma Durai	Tamil

Written only

- Naam Pirandha Mann (1977) (story)
- Meenakshi Kungumam (1978) (dialogues)
- Velum Mayilum Thunai (1979) (dialogues)
- Oru Vidukadhai Oru Thodarkadhai (1979) (dialogues)

== Personal life ==
Rajasekhar was married, and has a daughter and a son. Rajasekhar died in 1991, shortly after the release of his last film Dharma Durai at the age of 43.
