= M. Saravanan (producer) =

Indian film producer (1940–2025)

Saravanan Surya Mani (1939 – 4 December 2025), also known as AVM Saravanan, was an Indian film producer of Tamil cinema. His production company is AVM Productions, which was founded in 1945 by his father, the famed director-producer A. V. Meiyappan, who is widely regarded as one of the pioneers of Tamil cinema.

Saravanan was involved in hits such as Naanum Oru Penn, Samsaram Adhu Minsaram, Sivaji: The Boss, Vettaikaran, Minsara Kanavu, Leader and Ayan. He was the father of M. S. Guhan, another producer of movies. Saravanan owned the AVM Studios in Chennai. As a producer he won two Filmfare Awards South. He also served as the Sheriff of Madras in 1986.

Saravanan died on 4 December 2025, at the age of 85. He had been suffering from health issues for a few years and was undergoing treatment intermittently.

== Awards ==
Filmfare Awards South

- Best Film - Tamil - Naanum Oru Penn (1963)
- Best Film - Tamil - Samsaram Adhu Minsaram (1986)

=== Honours ===
- Kalaimamani Award - 1998
