= New Delhi (1988 Kannada film) =

- VCD cover
- Directed by: Joshiy
- Screenplay by: Dennis Joseph
- Story by: Dennis Joseph
- Based on: New Delhi (1987)
- Produced by: M.Sudhakar Reddy; Dr.M.Tirupathi Reddy; Rajeev Kumar
- Starring: Ambareesh; Suresh Gopi; Sumalatha
- Cinematography: Jayanan Vincent
- Edited by: K.Sankunni
- Music by: Shyam
- Production company: Samyuktha Productions
- Release date: 16 December 1988
- Running time: 143 minutes
- Country: India
- Language: Kannada

New Delhi is a 1988 Kannada-language action film directed by Joshiy and starring Ambareesh, Suresh Gopi and Sumalatha. It was produced by M.Sudhakar Reddy & M.Tirupathi Reddy of Samyuktha Productions banner and has music composed by Shyam. It is a remake of director's own Malayalam movie of same name (1987) whose story was loosely based on the novel The Almighty by Irving Wallace.

== Plot ==
New Delhi is about a Delhi-based journalist who is imprisoned in a mental asylum after exposing two corrupt politicians. The story follows his subsequent attempts at revenge with the help of his love interest. The story is loosely based on the novel The Almighty by Irving Wallace. The film is a remake of highly successful Malayalam film under the same title New Delhi released in 1987. It was Suresh Gopi's first Kannada (Sandalwood) film.

== Cast ==
- Ambareesh
- Suresh Gopi as Suresh
- Thiagarajan as Nataraj Vishnu aka Salem Vishnu
- Sumalatha as Vasantha
- Urvashi as Uma
- Paresh Rawal
- C. R. Simha
- Devan
- Lohitashwa
