= New Delhi (1988 Hindi film) =

- Theatrical release poster
- Directed by: Joshiy
- Written by: Dennis Joseph
- Based on: New Delhi (1987) by Dennis Joseph
- Produced by: M. Sudhakar Reddy; Dr. M. Tirupathi Reddy; Rajeev Kumar
- Starring: Jeetendra; Suresh Gopi; Thiagarajan; Sumalatha
- Cinematography: Jayanan Vincent
- Edited by: K. Sankunni
- Music by: Shyam
- Production company: Samyuktha Productions
- Distributed by: Eros International
- Release date: 16 December 1988
- Running time: 143 minutes
- Country: India
- Language: Hindi

New Delhi is a 1988 Hindi-language political thriller film directed by Joshiy, starring Jeetendra, Suresh Gopi and Thiagarajan in the lead roles. The film is a remake of the director's own Malayalam film New Delhi (1987). The story is loosely based on the novel The Almighty by Irving Wallace. It marked the Hindi debuts of Urvashi and Gopi who reprised their role from the original version. The film was declared as a flop at the box office.

== Cast ==
- Jeetendra as Vijay 'VK' Kumar
- Suresh Gopi as Suresh
- Thiagarajan as Nataraj Vishnu aka Salem Vishnu
- Sumalatha as Maria Fernandes
- Urvashi as Uma, Vijay's sister
- Raza Murad as Deshbandhu Sharma, Janseva Party's leader
- Devan as Shankar
- Siddique as Siddique
- Vijayaraghavan as Ananth
- Cochin Haneefa
- Jagannatha Varma
- Mohan Raj
- Mohan Jose as Johny
- Prathapachandran as Maria Fernandes' father
- Ashokan
