= Antima Theerpu =

Anthima Theerpu may refer to:

- Anthima Theerpu (1988 film), a Kannada-language film directed by A T Raghu, starring Ambarish and Bharathi.
- Anthima Theerpu (1988 film), a Telugu-language film directed by Joshiy, starring Krishnamraju and Suresh Gopi.
- Anthima Theerpu (2011 film), a Telugu-language dubbed film directed by Baburaj, starring Suresh Gopi and Vani Viswanath,.
- Anthima Theerpu (2024 film), a Telugu-language Thriller film directed by Abhiramu
