= Avatara Purusha (1989 film) =

- Directed by: Raj Kishor
- Written by: N. T. Jayarama Reddy
- Produced by: N. Venkatesh; H. Ramamurthy; B. Vijaykumar; P. Krishnananda Prabhu
- Starring: Ambareesh; Sumalatha
- Cinematography: N. K. Sathish
- Edited by: Bhaskar
- Music by: Vijayanand
- Release date: 24 April 1989
- Country: India
- Language: Kannada

Avatara Purusha is a 1989 Indian Kannada-language action thriller film, which stars Ambareesh and Sumalatha in the leading roles.

== Cast ==
- Ambareesh as Ajay
- Sumalatha as Shanthi
- Jai Jagadish
- C. R. Simha as Jagadeesh Prasad
- Sudheer as Dayanidhi
- Devaraj as Suresh
- Balakrishna as Seetharamayya
- Dinesh buttler
- Lakshman
- Thimmayya
- P. Sai kumar
- Lohithaswa as Srinidhi
- M. V. Vasudeva Rao
- Parvathavani
- Pandari Bai
- Tara
- Jyothi Bantwal
- Disco Shanthi
- Mysore Lokesh
- Shashikiran
- Shani Mahadevappa
- Srishailan
- Bharathish
- Vijay
- Shanthamma
- Shyamala
- Anitharani
- Sujatha
- Shobharani
- Uma

== Soundtrack ==
The music was composed by Vijay Anand.

- "Kannugala Thereyo" - S. P. Balasubrahmanyam
- "Ee Raatri" - Manjula Gururaj
- "Saagarake Chandramana" - Vani Jairam, S. P. Balasubrahmanyam
- "Prema Hrudayada" - Manjula Gururaj, S. P. Balasubrahmanyam
- "Kulukutha Balakuve" - Vani Jairam, S. P. Balasubrahmanyam
