= London (2005 Indian film) =

2005 film by Sundar. C

- Theatrical release poster
- Directed by: Sundar C
- Written by: Badri (dialogues)
- Screenplay by: Sundar C
- Story by: Priyadarshan
- Based on: Kakkakuyil (Malayalam)
- Produced by: Subha Sandeep
- Starring: Prashanth; Pandiarajan; Vadivelu; Ankitha; Mumtaj
- Cinematography: K. S. Shiva
- Edited by: P. Sai Suresh
- Music by: Vidyasagar
- Production companies: Inspired Movies; Spice Team Entertainments
- Release date: 11 March 2005
- Country: India
- Language: Tamil

London is a 2005 Indian Tamil-language comedy drama film directed by Sundar C. It is a remake of the 2001 Malayalam film Kakkakuyil. The film stars Prashanth and Pandiarajan, while Vadivelu, Ankitha, Mumtaj, Vijaykumar and Srividya play supporting roles. Vidyasagar composed the film's music. This was the last Tamil film of Srividya, just a year before her death.

London was released on 11 March 2005 and became a commercial hit.

== Plot ==
Shiva Raman, an easy-going young man from Chennai, comes to London in search of a job, but he loses all of his certificates. He finds Kathiravan wandering in London aimlessly without a job. Now, they both need job and money. Kathir persuades Shiva to join a bank robbery planned by Bhaskharan, his stammering brother Natrajan and Aishwarya, who is Bhaskaran's lover, are also in on the job. After the robbery, Aishwarya informs the police about the robbery and that the entire plan was hatched by Bhaskaran. Bhaskaran hides the money before getting arrested, and the hiding place is known only to his lawyer Vedimuthu. Aishwarya pretends to be in love with Vedimuthu to find where the money is hidden.

Meanwhile, to find a safe cover, Shiva and Kathir plan to imitate Saravanan, the grandson of a rich elderly couple: Rajasekar and his wife Parvathi. They have not seen their grandchild since his birth. Shiva and Kathir end up feigning to be Kadhir's body and Shiva's voice to make up for Saravanan in front of the blind couple. Ganesh, who knows Kathir before, makes several attempts to expose the truth to the couple, but all fail, due to Shiva and Kadhir's luck. All of a sudden, Anjali arrives pretending to be Saravanan's lover. She calls on all the relatives of Rajasekar and Parvathi. The relatives arrive in Shiva's absence. Finding no way out, Kathir pretends to have fainted, and he is admitted to the hospital. Shiva comes to his rescue, and says that he is Dr. Karthikeyan, a friend of Saravanan from America.

Amidst their drama, Kathir tries to steal the Lord Muruga statue, for which he plays a trick to injure Parvathi, which keeps all others out of the house for sometime. Shiva engages in a fight with Kathir when he tries to leave with the statue that he had stolen. Rajasekar accuses his relatives for his wife's accident and asks all of his relatives to leave at once. Shiva and Kathir get separated and part ways. A drunk Ganesh finally manages to reveal the truth to Rajasekar about Saravan's death in an accident following which Anjali reveals the truth to him that she is actually Saravanan's secretary and had come to explain about Saravanan's death in an accident in America. She also explains that Siva and Kathir were acting/posing as Saravanan & that she took part in the drama not wanting to ruin their happiness. After revealing all this, she gives them money and asks them to get out of the house. Shiva, realizing his mistake, refuses to take the money and asks Kathir not to take the money. Kathir leaves Shiva in anger, taking the money with him. Shiva returns to Rajasekar and confesses all of his mistakes. Rajasekar asks them to continue the drama for the sake of his wife, who loves her grandson more than her life. Parvathy comes and calls Saravanan but gets no replies. She finally gets hold of the arms of Kathir, who has returned in remorse. Hence, the movie happily ends with the marriage of Shiva and Anjali, who by now have fallen in love with each other.

== Cast ==
- Prashanth as Shiva Raman "Shiva"/Saravanan's voice
- Pandiarajan as Kathiravan "Kathir" /Saravanan's body
- Vadivelu as Advocate Vedimuthu
- Ankitha as Anjali
- Mumtaj as Aishwarya "Ais"
- Vijayakumar as Rajasekar, Saravanan's grandfather
- Srividya as Parvathi, Saravanan's grandmother
- Manivannan as Bhaskharan alias Boss
- Nalini as Baby, Vedimuthu's legal wife
- Delhi Ganesh as Ganeshan alias Kudikaran
- Mayilsamy as Natrajan Krishna Moorthi alias Nattu Kicchu
- Chitra Lakshmanan as Rajkumar
- Vichu Vishwanath
- K. R. Vatsala
- Ben Dover as a police officer
- Jade Goody as a chav
- Brinda Das as Rajalakshmi alias Raji
- Michelle Thorne as a dominatrix
- Lakshmi Rattan as Family Doctor
- 'Kolangal' Srividhya as Vedimuthu's legal daughter

== Production ==
London was announced to be the first Tamil film production of Spice Team Entertainment, a wing of Inspired Movies in the UK and also signed up to distribute the film. In late 2004, the team shot scenes for 25 days across London and due to the early sunset, ended up having early starts to make use of the daylight hours. Scenes were filmed primarily in studios in Chennai, though outdoor scenes were shot near Buckingham Palace and Piccadilly Circus amongst other locations. The film was completed and ready for release in February 2005 and Prashanth opted to release London before his other completed film, Adaikalam.

== Music ==
The soundtrack was composed by Vidyasagar, and was released on 24 February 2005 at Spencer Plaza.

Song	Singer(s)	Lyrics
"Atho Atho"	Pop Shalini, Udit Narayan, Premji Amaran	P. Vijay
"Adimithu Adi"	Kamaal Khan, Benny Dayal	P. Vijay
"Azhagiya Vizhigalil"	Sadhana Sargam, Madhu Balakrishnan	Yugabharathi
"Kee Mu Kee Pee"	Karthik, Praveen Mani, Tippu	Na. Muthukumar
"Badavaa"	Sujatha, Vijay Yesudas	P. Vijay
"Yaaro Oruthi"	Karthik	Yugabharathi

== Critical reception ==
Malathi Rangarajan of The Hindu wrote, "London comically stresses on the importance of wealth in this mercenary world and in the bargain logic, credulity and spontaneity go for a toss." Sify gave the film a positive review noting that "Please leave your logical mind at home when you watch a Sundar.C film. The trio of Prashanth-Sundar.C-Vadivelu has a “Winner” in London". Visual Dasan of Kalki gave a sarcastic review on the film in the form of headlines.
