= Vellam =

Vellam may refer to:

- Vellam (1985 film), an Indian Malayalam-language film
- Vellam (2021 film), an Indian Malayalam-language biographical drama film
