= Sumalatha =

Indian actress and politician (born 1963)

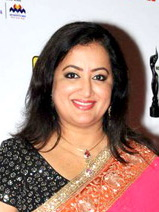
- Sumalatha in 2019

Member of Parliament, Lok Sabha
- In office 23 May 2019 – 4 June 2024
- Preceded by: L. R. Shivarame Gowda
- Succeeded by: H.D.Kumaraswamy
- Constituency: Mandya

Personal details
- Born: 27 August 1963 (age 63) Madras, Madras State (present-day Chennai, Tamil Nadu), India
- Party: Bharatiya Janata Party (2024–present)
- Other political affiliations: Independent (2019–2024)
- Spouse: Ambareesh (m. 1991; died 2018)
- Children: Abhishek Gowda
- Occupation: Actress; politician

Sumalatha Ambareesh (born 27 August 1963), known mononymously as Sumalatha, is an Indian actress and politician. She has acted in over 220 films across multiple languages, primarily in Telugu, Malayalam, and Kannada, with a few appearances in Tamil and Hindi cinema. She received the Nandi Award for Best Actress for her role in Sruthilayalu (1987).

Sumalatha is the widow of Kannada actor-politician Ambareesh, with whom she has a son, Abhishek Ambareesh. In March 2019, she announced her candidacy for the Mandya Lok Sabha seat in Karnataka. Contesting as an independent, she won the election, defeating Nikhil Kumaraswamy by a margin of over 1.25 lakh votes.

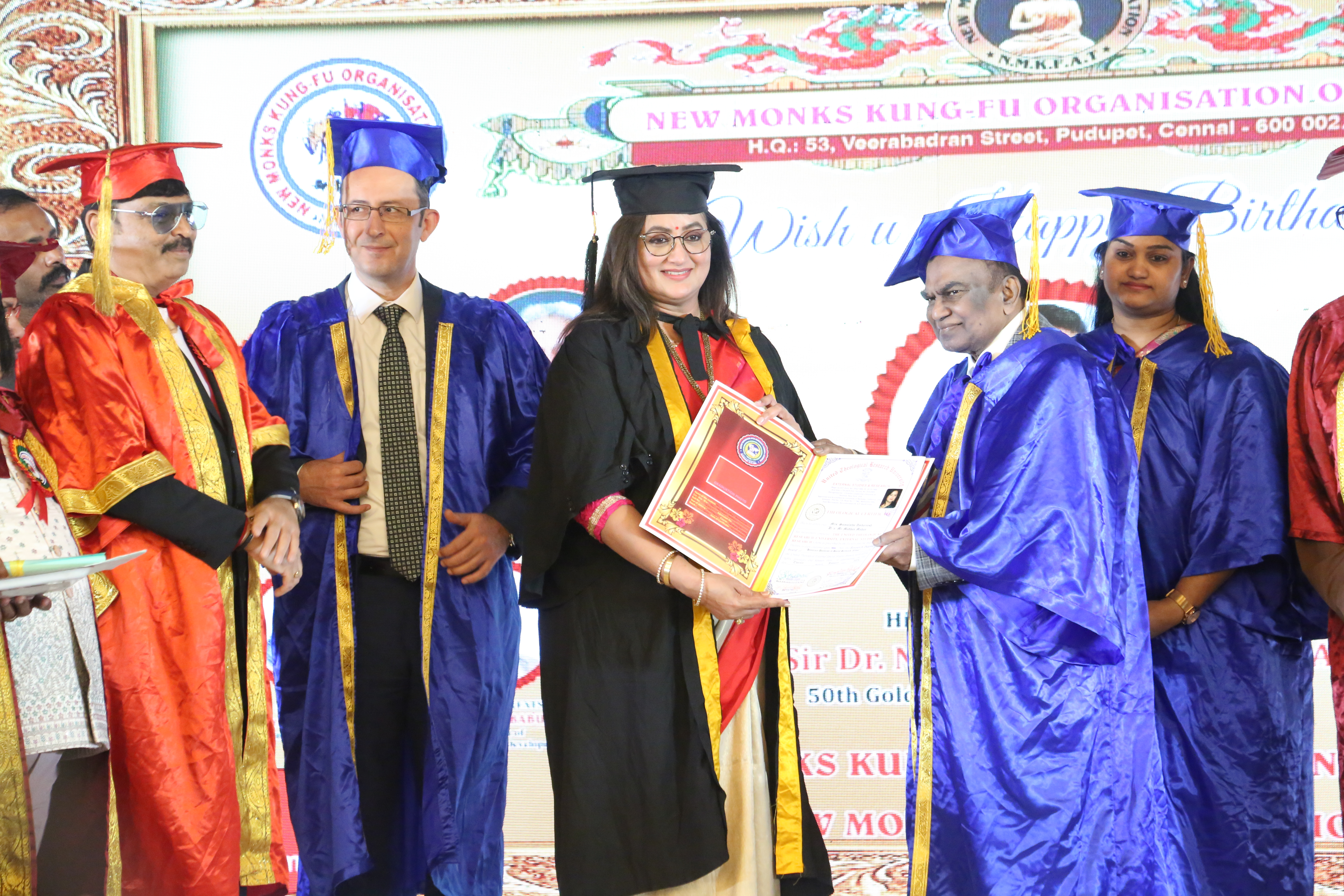
Sumalatha Received Honorary Doctorate from United Technological Research University of America

== Career ==
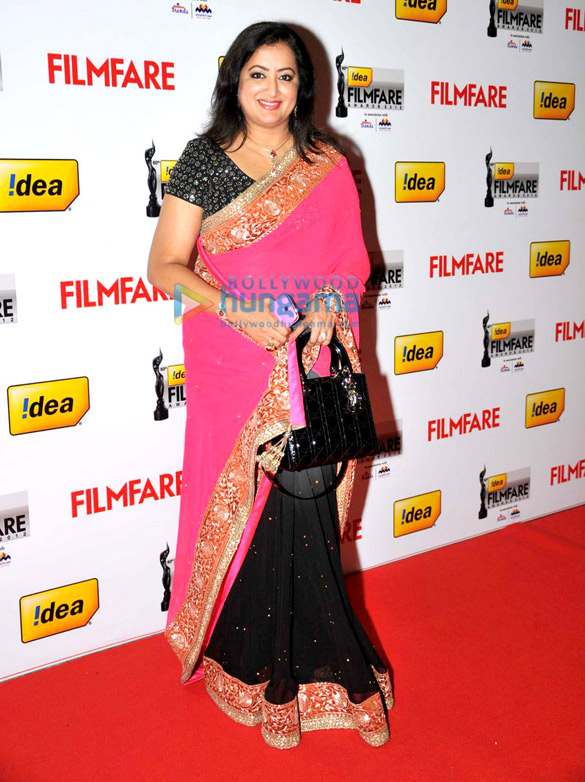
Sumalatha during 60th Filmfare Awards South in 2013

Sumalatha did her schooling at St. Joseph's Convent School, Brodipet, Guntur. She began acting at age 15, after winning an Andhra Pradesh beauty contest in 1979. After her pictures began circulating in the magazines, film producer D. Ramanaidu expressed interest in casting her in his film and offered her a signing amount of ₹1,001 in 1979. However, she made her film debut in Tamil with Thisai Maariya Paravaigal (1979). She was named the Best New Face following the film.

She entered the Telugu film industry with Samajaniki Saval (1979). She made her Kannada debut with Ravichandra (1980) opposite Dr. Rajkumar her Malayalam debut with Moorkhan (1980). She was Rajinikanth's heroine along with Rati Agnihotri in films like Murattu Kaalai and Kazhugu. She was the heroine of legendary Malayalam actor Jayan's last film Kolilakkam (1981).

Sumalatha reportedly speaks six languages, and has acted in five appearing in many Telugu, Malayalam, Kannada films and a few in Tamil and Hindi. Her most memorable Malayalam films include Thazhvaram, Isabella, Nirakkoottu, Dhinarathrangal, Thoovanathumbikal, Parampara and New Delhi. Her popular Kannada movies include Aahuti, Avatara Purusha, New Delhi, Taayi Kanasu, Karna, Hong Kongnalli Agent Amar, Taayiya Hone and Kallarali Hoovagii.

She received the best actress Nandi Award for her role in Shrutilayalu in 1987.

She is a close friend of actress Suhasini Maniratnam. The friendship between the two provided the material for a candid scene in the film, when director Kodandarami Reddy noticed Suhasini combing Sumalatha's long hair on a train journey to the film set. Reddy had asked his cameraman, Ashok Reddy, to film the two and added the scene to the movie's final cut.

== Personal life ==
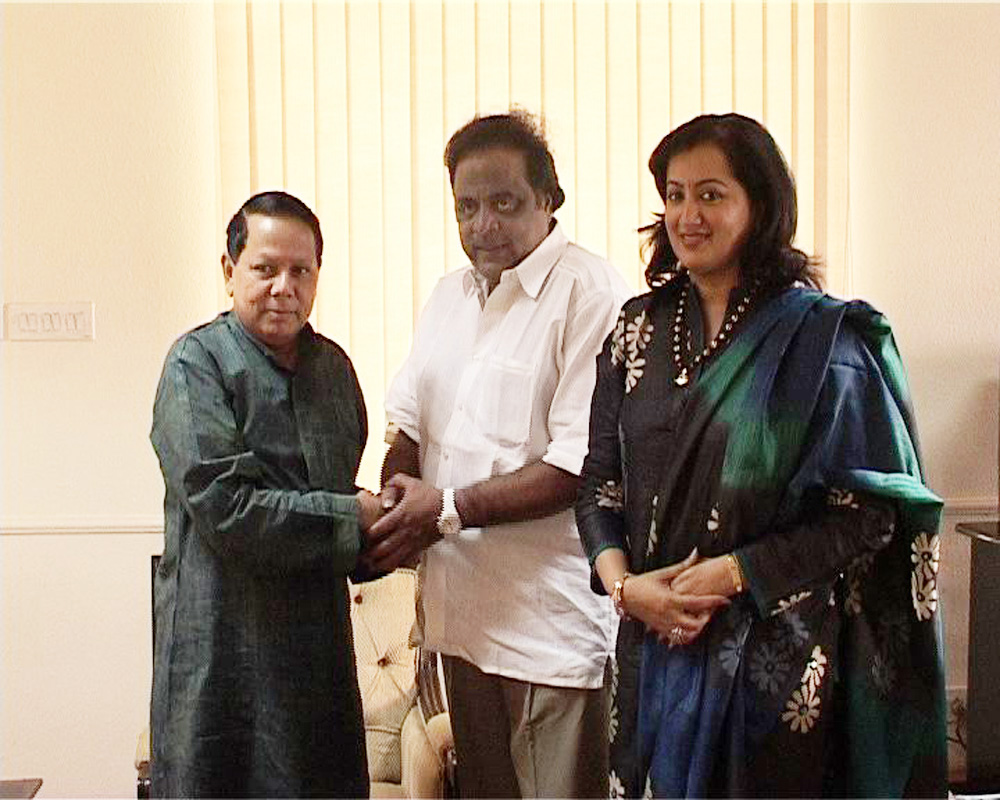
Sumalatha with husband Ambareesh

Sumalatha married Kannada actor and politician Ambareesh on 8 December 1991 and their son Abhishek Gowda was born in the year 1993. She starred alongside Ambareesh in movies like Aahuti, Avatara Purusha, Kallarali Hoovagi, New Delhi and Sri Manjunatha. Kallarali Hoovagi went on to win a National Film Award.

In an interview with TV9 Kannada, the couple revealed that they first met each other on the sets of the movie Aahuti. In the course of the interview, Sumalatha expressed that Ambareesh was extroverted and gregarious in nature where as she leaned more towards an introverted and conscientious personality on the sets. She shared memories of Ambareesh giving her friendly advice to mingle with other co-stars on set by involving herself in group activities; else it could lead to misunderstandings. She revealed that it was Ambareesh's bold, and carefree personality that made him memorable and attractive to her.

On 24 November 2018 Ambareesh died due to a cardiac arrest. Sumalatha shared an emotional letter addressed to late Ambareesh on 8 December 2018, their 27th wedding anniversary. On 6 July 2020, it was reported that Sumalatha tested positive for COVID-19 and had placed herself in home quarantine.

== Political life ==
In March 2019, Sumalatha announced that she would be contesting as an independent candidate in the 2019 Indian general election in Karnataka (Lok Sabha) from Mandya. She was backed by big stars from the Kannada film industry like Darshan, Yash, Rockline Venkatesh, Doddanna. Bharatiya Janata Party decided not to field a candidate in Mandya in efforts to support her. Some of the Congress Party workers supported her indirectly due to the history of traditional rivalry between JDS - Congress rivalry in Mandya which was a tricky situation for congress. She won, defeating Nikhil with a margin of 128,876 votes. She is the first Independent woman Member of parliament from Karnataka.

Sumalatha joined BJP ahead of 2024 Lok Sabha Elections on 5 April 2024 in the presence of Former Chief Ministers B S Yediyurappa and D V Sadananda Gowda, State President B Y Vijayendra, Leader of Opposition in the state Assembly R Ashoka, national General Secretary in-charge of elections in Karnataka Radha Mohan Das Agarwal.

== Awards ==
- Devar's Best New Face Award: Thisai Maariya Paravaigal (1979) (Tamil)
- Special Jury Nandi award (Best Actress): Sruthilayalu (1987) (Telugu)
- Film Fans Award for Best Actress: Sruthilayalu (1987) (Telugu)
- Kerala Film Critics Award for Best Actress: New Delhi and Thoovanathumbikal (1987) (Malayalam)
- Lux Award for Best Actress: New Delhi (1987) (Malayalam)
- Film Fans Award for Best Actress: New Delhi (1987) (Hindi)
- Kerala Film Critics Award for Best Actress: Isabella (1988) (Malayalam)
- Honorary doctorate by the United Technological Research University of America in Hyderabad (2024).

== Filmography ==
=== Telugu ===
- Karunamayudu (1978)
- Samajaniki Saval (1979)
- Rajadhi Raju (1980) as Lilly
- Bhola Shankarudu (1980)
- Kalam Marindi (1980)
- Girija Kalyanam (1981) as Rosy
- Agni Poolu (1981)
- Jeevitha Ratham (1981) as Sandhya
- Pelleedu Pillalu (1982) as Poorna
- Subhalekha (1982) as Sujata
- Hima Bindu (1982)
- Savaal (1982)
- Aalaya Sikharam (1983) as Radha
- Khaidi (1983) as Dr. Sujata
- Raghu Ramudu (1983)
- Rangula Puli (1983)
- Bharya Bhartala Saval (1983)
- Bahudoorapu Batasari (1983)
- Amarajeevi (1983)
- Merupu Daadi (1984) as Sivangi
- Justice Chakravarthy (1984) as Latha
- Janani Janmabhoomi (1984) as Pammy/Padmini
- Agni Gundam (1984)
- Kai Raja Kai (1984)
- Jagan (1984)
- Bhola Shankarudu (1984)
- Pulijoodam (1984)
- Uddhandudu (1984)
- Nayakulaku Saval (1984) as Lalitha
- Pralaya Simham (1984) as Aruna
- Jackie (1985)
- Chattamtho Poratam (1985) as Kalyani
- Kattula Kondayya (1985) as Jyothi
- Ranarangam (1985)
- Intiko Rudramma (1985) as Ganga
- Mugguru Mitrulu (1985)
- Srimathi Garu (1985)
- Illalu Vardhillu (1985)
- Veta (1986) as Jyothirmayi
- Tandra Paparayudu (1986) as Subhadra
- Rakshasudu (1986) as Vani
- Jeevana Ragam (1986)
- Iddaru Mithrulu (1986)
- Jailu Pakshi (1986)
- Nampalli Nagu (1986)
- Ashtalakshmi Vaibhavam (1986)
- Thandri Kodukula Challenge (1987)
- Sruthi Layalu (1987) as Sita
- Pasivadi Pranam (1987)
- Trimurtulu (1987) as Cameo
- Swayam Krushi (1987) as Sharada
- Viswanatha Nayakudu (1987)
- Punnami Chandrudu (1987)
- Raaga Leela (1987)
- Donga Kollu (1988) as Neeraja
- Antima Teerpu (1988) as Vasanta
- Donga Pelli (1988)
- Jamadagni (1988)
- Jayammu Nischayammu Raa as Shanti
- Guru Sishyulu (1990)
- Gang Leader (1991) as Latha
- Dabbu Bhale Jabbu (1992) as Hema
- Raja Kumarudu (1999) as Rajya Lakshmi
- Okkadu Chalu (2000) as Lakshmi
- Sri Manjunatha (2001)
- Boss (2006)
- Srirastu Subhamastu (2016)

=== Malayalam ===
- Naayika (2011) as herself (Archive footage/Uncredited cameo)
- Kandahar (2010) as Sumangaly
- Purappadu (1990) as Nalini
- Parampara (1990) as Meera
- Ee Thanutha Veluppan Kalathu (1990) as Lakshmi Haridas
- No.20 Madras Mail (1990) as Sr. Gloria
- Thazhvaram (1990) as Kochootti
- Nair Saab (1989) as Prabha
- Unnikrishnante Adyathe Christmas (1988) as Sophia
- Dhinarathrangal (1988) as Dr. Savithri
- David David Mr. David (1988)
- Isabella (1988) as Isabella
- New Delhi (1987) as Maria Fernandez
- Thoovanathumbikal (1987) as Clara
- Shyama (1986) as Lakshmi
- Nirakkoottu (1985) as Mercy
- Idavelakku Shesham (1984) as Sindhu
- Alakadalinakkare (1984) as Mohan's wife
- Himam (1983) as Indu
- Chakravalam Chuvannappol (1983) as Latha
- Kodunkattu (1983) as Sreekala
- Kilukilukkam (1982)
- John Jaffer Janardhanan (1982) as Jeny
- Thadaakam (1982) as Sabira
- Kazhumaram (1982) as Radhika
- Aarambham (1982) as Santha
- Dheera (1982) as Rathi
- Irattimadhuram (1982) as Sangeetha
- Aranjaanam (1982) as Anu
- Aadarsham (1982) as Radha
- Thenum Vayambum (1981) as Sreedevi
- Ithihasam (1981) as Shobha
- Munnettam (1981) as Ramani
- Kolilakkam (1981) as Suma
- Raktham (1981) as Valsala
- Kadathu (1981) as ThulasiKilungaatha Changalakal
- Saahasam (1981)
- Ellam Ninakku Vendi (1981) as Sreedevi
- Kilungaatha Changalakal (1981) as Latha
- Nizhal Yudham (1981) as Radha
- Moorkhan (1980) as Raji
- Vilangum Veenayum

=== Kannada ===
- Ravichandra (1980)...Sheela
- Thayiya Kanasu (1985)
- Aahuti (1985)
- Thayiya Hone (1985)...Suma
- Thayi Mamathe (1985)
- Karna (1986)
- Kathanayaka (1986)
- Sathya Jyothi (1986)
- Huli Hebbuli (1987)...Dr. Priya
- Thayigobba Karna (1988)
- New Delhi (1988)...Vasantha
- Hongkongnalli Agent Amar (1989)
- Nyayakkagi Naanu (1989)
- Raja Yuvaraja (1989)
- Maheshwara (1990)
- Kaliyuga Bheema (1991)
- Sri Manjunatha (2001)...Sumalatha Devi
- Paris Pranaya (2003)
- Excuse Me (2003)...Parvati
- Kanchana Ganga (2004)
- Kallarali Hoovagi (2006)
- Bhoopathi (2007)
- Ee Sambhashane (2009)
- Varadhanayaka (2013)
- Viraat (2016)...Viraat's mother
- Bhale Jodi (2016)
- Jessie (2016)...Jessie's mother
- Doddmane Hudga (2016)...Doddamane Rajeeva's wife
- Thayige Thakka Maga (2018)...Parvathi
- D/O Parvathamma (2019)...Parvathamma
- India vs England (2020)...Janaki
- Hope (2022)...Sulakshana Amarnath
- Kranti (2023)...Chief Minister

=== Tamil ===
- Thisai Maariya Paravaigal (1979)
- Murattu Kaalai (1980) as Soundarya
- Azhaithal Varuven (1980) as Rani
- Kazhugu (1981) as Suma
- Karaiyellam Shenbagapoo (1981) as Snegalatha
- Pen Manam Pesugirathu (1981)
- Aradhanai (1981)
- Enakkaga Kaathiru (1981)
- Sollathe Yarum Kettaal (1981)
- Kudumbam Oru Kadambam (1981) as Uma
- Theerpu (1982) as Kalpana
- Azhagiya Kanne (1982)
- Oru Varisu Uruvagiradhu (1982)
- Oru Odai Nadhiyagirathu (1983) as Divya

=== Hindi ===
- New Delhi (1988) as Maria Fernandes
- Pratibandh (1990) as Naseem
- Swarg Yahan Narak Yahan (1991) as Suman V. Kumar
- Aaj Ka Goonda Raj (1992) as Ritu Saxena
- Pardesi (1993)
- Dushman Duniya Ka (1996) as Reshma
- Mahaanta (1997) as Shanti Malhotra
- Kshatriya (1993) as Suman, Maharaja Prithvi Singh's wife (Surjangarh)
