= Neengal Kettavai =

1984 film by Balu Mahendra

- Theatrical release poster
- Directed by: Balu Mahendra
- Story by: Akila Mahendra
- Starring: Thiagarajan; Bhanu Chander; Archana; Silk Smitha
- Cinematography: Balu Mahendra
- Edited by: D. Vasu
- Music by: Ilaiyaraaja
- Production company: Filmco
- Release date: 28 June 1984
- Running time: 132 minutes
- Country: India
- Language: Tamil

Neengal Kettavai (pronounced [n̪iːŋɡaɭ keːʈʈaʋaɪ] transl. What you asked for) is a 1984 Indian Tamil-language masala film written and directed by Balu Mahendra. It stars Thiagarajan, Bhanu Chander, Archana and Silk Smitha in major roles, while Jaishankar had an extended cameo. The film was released on 28 June 1984 and was commercially successful.

== Plot ==
A widow living in Ooty, leads a peaceful life with her two sons. Muthulingam, a tourist who visits the place rapes her. In the act, she dies leaving her two sons who witness the murder. The older son Ramu is raised by his maternal uncle while the younger brother Arun joins a blind music teacher as he has great interest in music. Years later, he becomes a great singer. Meanwhile, Ramu is trained effectively by his uncle learning martial arts with the intention of avenging the death of his mother as he very well remembers the culprit's face. With a turn of events leading to both sons joining and taking revenge for their mother's death forms the rest of the story.

== Cast ==
- Thiagarajan as Arun
- Bhanu Chander as Ramu
- Archana as Radha
- Smitha as Arun's girlfriend
- Poornima Bhagyaraj as Ramu and Arun's mother
- Y. G. Mahendran as James
- Somayajulu as the music teacher
- Balan K. Nair as the stunt master's friend and uncle of Ramu and Arun
- Senthamarai as the stunt master and Radha's father
- Thengai Srinivasan as the director
- Jaishankar as Muthulingam
- Madhan Bob as the keyboardist in "Adiye Manam Nilluna"

== Production ==
Archana made her Tamil cinema debut with the film. The film, unlike Balu Mahendra's previous offbeat ventures, was an "outright commercial picture". He claimed that he made the film to prove his critics that he could make such films. Hence he titled the film Neengal Kettavai (transl. What you asked for). The film was launched at Prasad Studios. Prabhu and Radha were reported to be initial cast members. The filming began at Mysore. A few scenes were shot at the VGP Golden Beach. The song "Oh Vasantha Raja" was shot at various locations including the Gangaikonda Cholapuram temple. It took nine days to finish filming the song.

== Soundtrack ==
The soundtrack was composed by Ilaiyaraaja. The song "Kanavu Kaanum" is based on "Kasme Vaade" from the Hindi film Upkar (1967). For the dubbed Telugu version Kodama Simhalu, the lyrics were written by L. Aathma Rao and Rajasri. The song "Adiye Manam Nilluna" was later interpolated by Ilaiyaraaja's son Yuvan Shankar Raja for Daas (2005) as "Vaa Vaa".

Tamil
No.	Title	Lyrics	Singer(s)	Length
1.	"Adiye Manam Nilluna"	Gangai Amaran	S. P. Balasubrahmanyam, S. Janaki	5:14
2.	"Kanavu Kaanum"	Vairamuthu	K. J. Yesudas	5:18
3.	"Naane Raja"	Na. Kamarasan	S. P. Balasubrahmanyam, S. Janaki	4:25
4.	"Oh Vasantha Raaja"	Pulamaipithan	S. P. Balasubrahmanyam, S. Janaki	4:23
5.	"Pillai Nila" (female)	Vairamuthu	S. Janaki	4:20
6.	"Pillai Nila" (male)	Vairamuthu	K. J. Yesudas	4:51
Total length:				28:31

Telugu
No.	Title	Lyrics	Singer(s)	Length
1.	"Nene Raja"	L. Aathma Rao	Ravichandra	3:53
2.	"Edhi Paapam Edhi Shaapam"	Rajasri	Ramakrishna	4:25
3.	"Edhi Bomma Muddula Gumma"	L. Aathma Rao	Chinna, Padma	4:58
4.	"Poochendulo Viruyu"	Rajasri	P. Susheela	4:13
5.	"O Vasantha Raagam"	L. Aathma Rao	P. Susheela, Radha Mohan	4:06
6.	"Poochendulo Viruyu" (Sad)	Rajasri	Ramakrishna	4:39
Total length:				26:14

== Release and reception ==
Neengal Kettavai was released on 28 June 1984. Kalki caustically commented, "Balu Mahendra, idhaiyaa kettom?" (Balu Mahendra, is this what we asked for?). Despite the film's box-office success, Mahendra opted to continue making offbeat films.
