= Aahuti (1985 film) =

1985 film

- Directed by: T. S. Nagabharana
- Written by: Somu
- Produced by: U. S. N. Babu
- Starring: Ambareesh; Sumalatha; Roopadevi
- Cinematography: Vijay
- Edited by: K. Gopal Rao
- Music by: M. Ranga Rao
- Production company: Padmavathi Combines
- Release date: 1985
- Running time: 133 minutes
- Country: India
- Language: Kannada

Aahuti is a 1985 Indian Kannada-language action drama film, directed by T. S. Nagabharana and produced by U. S. N. Babu. The film stars Ambareesh, Sumalatha and Roopadevi. The film's story and dialogues were written by Somu. The film's score and the soundtrack were scored by M. Ranga Rao and the cinematography was by Vijay.

It is reported that Ambareesh and Sumalatha became friends during the making of this film and eventually married in 1991 after 6 years.

== Cast ==
- Ambareesh
- Sumalatha
- Roopadevi
- Dheerendra Gopal
- Sundar Krishna Urs
- Balakrishna
- Mukhyamantri Chandru
- Musuri Krishnamurthy
- Shakti Prasad
- M. N. Lakshmi Devi
- Ashalatha
- Anuradha
- Sudheer
- Mysore Lokesh
- Sundaramma

== Soundtrack ==
The soundtrack of the film was composed by M. Ranga Rao.

Track listing
No.	Title	Lyrics	Singer(s)	Length
1.	"Olavemba Hoovina Thera"	Chi. Udayashankar	S. P. Balasubrahmanyam, S. Janaki
2.	"Raathri Aadaga"	Chi. Udayashankar	S. Janaki
3.	"Sudabeku Sudabeku"	Chi. Udayashankar	S. P. Balasubrahmanyam, S. Janaki
4.	"Nammavva Maathayi"	R. N. Jayagopal	S. P. Balasubrahmanyam, S. Janaki
