= Prashanth =

Indian actor (born 1973)

- Born: Prashanth Thiagarajan; 6 April 1973 (age 53); Madras, Tamil Nadu, India
- Occupations: Actor; Businessman; Playback singer; Film producer
- Years active: 1990–present
- Spouse: Grahalakshmi (m. 2005; div. 2009)
- Children: 1
- Father: Thiagarajan
- Relatives: Peketi Sivaram (grandfather); Jayanthi (step-maternal grandmother)

Prashanth Thiagarajan (born 6 April 1973) is an Indian actor, businessman, playback singer and film producer known for his works predominantly in Tamil cinema. Besides Tamil films, he has also appeared in few Telugu, Hindi and Malayalam films.

At the peak of his career in the late 1990s, Prashanth was one of the popular actors in South India. He has won a Kalaimamani Award from the Government of Tamil Nadu. The son of actor-director Thiagarajan, Prashanth began his career at age 17 with the Tamil film Vaigasi Poranthachu (1990) and went on to feature in other films including Balu Mahendra's Vanna Vanna Pookkal (1992), R. K. Selvamani's Chembaruthi (1992) and Mani Ratnam's Thiruda Thiruda (1993).

Prashanth rose to stardom with Shankar's romantic comedy Jeans (1998) in which he played a dual role alongside Aishwarya Rai. The success of Jeans saw him garner opportunities to work in bigger film projects and in the late 1990s, he featured in a series of breakthrough films such as Kannedhirey Thondrinal (1998), Kaadhal Kavithai (1998), Jodi (1999) and Parthen Rasithen (2000). He went on to star in several successful films including Chocklet (2001), Majunu (2001), Thamizh (2002), Virumbukiren (2002), Winner (2003), Shock (2004) and London (2005). After a prolonged career setback, he made a comeback with Andhagan (2024), as well as appearing in The Greatest of All Time (2024) alongside Vijay.

== Early life ==
Prashanth was born on 6 April 1973 in Chennai in the state of Tamil Nadu, India. He is the son of Tamil actor and filmmaker Thiagarajan, and Peketi Shanthi, the daughter of Telugu actor Peketi Sivaram. His paternal cousin is fellow film actor Vikram. He has a younger sister, Preethi.

Prashanth studied Computer Graphics and Multimedia and went to Trinity College of Music in London before embarking on an acting career. He completed his 12th grade and was enlisted in two medical colleges. His first intention was to be a doctor, but he eventually decided to be an actor and filmmaker, like his father T. Thiagarajan.

Prashanth owns a multi-storeyed jewelry mart in Panagal Park. He is also a trained pianist.

== Career ==
=== Early roles (1990–1997) ===
Prashanth started off as a leading romantic hero in the 1990 Tamil film Vaigasi Poranthachu at the age of 17. He then appeared in the Malayalam film Perumthachan written by M. T. Vasudevan Nair where he played the son of the title character. He also acted in Tholi Muddhu alongside Divya Bharti which was the remake of the Bollywood film Dil.

Prashanth focused on Tamil and acted in Thiruda Thiruda (1993) directed by Mani Ratnam and music by A. R. Rahman. Prashanth used to be the chocolate boy of Tamil cinema during the 1990s and he plays a variation of that stereotype in portraying Azhagu. This is the most adventurous of Mani Ratnam's movies. The film also won National Film Award for Best Special Effects. At the end of the year, he acted in the film Kizhakke Varum Paattu (1993). In 1994, he released three films like Rasa Magan, Kanmani and Senthamizh Selvan. These films had an average success. Aanazhagan (1995), his only movie of the year was directed by Prashanth's father and actor Thiagarajan. The film revolves around Prashanth and his friends who search for a new house after being kicked out from the previous place. Prashanth is forced to dress in the drag after the landlady insists that the house only for a family man and not bachelors. Aanazhagan was very successful at the box-office. The comedy tracks are still remembered today, and a stellar performance of Prashanth as Lakshmi. In 1996, he co-starred with Ajith Kumar in Kalloori Vaasal. The film opened on 18 February 1996 to negative reviews. Krishna (1996) and Mannava (1997) are also two medium success films.

=== Breakthrough and success (1998–1999) ===
In 1998, Prashanth appeared in dual roles in S. Shankar's film, Jeans. It was quite the commercial enterprise. It featured Miss World 1994 winner Aishwarya Rai as the lead actress. The film was a modern-day Twelfth Night adaptation. The film has been nominated several awards in the country. The film opened to Indian audiences on 24 April 1998 and was the most expensive film to be made in Indian cinema at that time. One particular song Poovukkul, says Shankar, has been filmed at the "seven wonders of the world", with Rai being referred to as "the eighth wonder", with her beauty being no less than those wonders. It was later dubbed into Hindi and Telugu languages. He acted in two other romantic films that year, namely Kannedhirey Thondrinal and Kaadhal Kavithai. In 1999, he acted in romantic family dramas movies, Poomagal Oorvalam, Jodi, Hello and Aasaiyil Oru Kaditham.

At the peak of his career in the late 1990s, Prashanth appeared in stage events for the Tamil diaspora titled "Prashanth Star Nite". Featuring him alongside actresses and comedians, the show was held in Malaysia, Singapore and then at Wembley Arena in London.

=== Career consolidation (2000–2006) ===
In 2000, Prashanth acted in Good Luck, Appu, and Parthen Rasithen, with the latter becoming a huge commercial success. In 2001, he starred in Piriyadha Varam Vendum alongside Shalini. The film, which had a delayed release, was a success. He followed this with Star, Chocklet and Majunu.

Prashanth then collaborated with director Hari, making his debut, for the action drama film, Thamizh (2002). For his titular role, Prashanth worked out a lot, grew a beard and began smoking cigarettes to get into character. The film gained positive reviews upon release, with a critic noting the "Prashanth has matured into a performer of merit" and that "the transformation of a fun-loving, cheerful young man into a thug has been conceived well by director Hari and creditably executed by Prashanth". The film became a box office success despite opening with little publicity, with positive word of mouth significantly helping the film's prospects. The success of the film prompted Prashanth to move away from romantic films and strive to work on more action drama films. His next release, Susi Ganesan's Virumbukiren had a delayed release in 2002, and won positive reviews from critics. For his role of a firefighter, Prashanth undertook official training, and reviewers described his portrayal as "top class". Sundar C's Winner (2003) also won appreciation for its comedy track by Vadivelu, and performed well at the box office.

In a sudden change of strategy, Prashanth chose to focus on acting in films produced by his father Thiagarajan for the family's production studio, Lakshmi Shanthi Movies. The action drama Jai (2004) did not perform well at the box office and received mixed reviews. A critic from Sify.com called Jai "tedious" and added that "on the whole Prashanth has to try out something new". Post-release, Prashanth noted that as a producer of the film, the team had tried hard but ran into problems to begin with, lamenting that the project had been delayed by a year before filming started and thus the script lost its freshness. The horror film Shock, a remake of a Hindi film, was a hit. Other films including the action drama Aayudham (2005) and comedy London (2005), similarly met with a tepid response at the box office.

The actor suffered a setback in the mid-2000s, when he went on signing spree only for several of his projects to become shelved after being launched. In September 2004, Thiagarajan launched Police, a remake of the Hindi film Khakee and the film received coverage from the media after producers had approached Amitabh Bachchan and Aishwarya Rai for key roles, however the film failed to progress. Prashanth next signed on to appear in Susi Ganesan's village action story Sakkarai in October 2004 only for the film to be discontinued after a grand launch ceremony. In mid-2005, the actor began filming for A. Venkatesh's Petrol and after several leading actresses were approached to play the lead heroine, newcomer Seema was selected. The film continued to shoot schedules for close to a year across India, but Prashanth's marital problems eventually led to delays in the director's schedule and the film remains uncompleted.

In December 2005, Prashanth started work on R. K. Selvamani's Pulan Visaranai 2, a sequel to the director's 1990 film, with the film's soundtrack and trailer released by 2006. However, despite completion, the film was on hold for eight years due to producer's financial problems, before having a limited release in 2015. Furthermore, Ramesh Selvan's action film Runway was launched amidst much publicity in April 2006 but was discontinued despite the team filming a schedule with actress Ferhana. Morgan's Taxi Driver alongside Reemma Sen and Namitha was also planned amidst much hype, with the team announcing schedules in the Middle East as well as marking the debut of music composer G. V. Prakash Kumar; though the film was later shelved. His father's production Kattan with director Suresh also never took off despite an official announcement. The actor's other projects during the period which were announced but never made included Raghuraj's Jockey, Mukil's Arun Weds Harini and Cheyyar Ravi's Vithagan.

The actor's three films which released in 2006 had all been severely delayed during production and neither of the films made any notable impact at the box office. Jambhavan, which released in September 2006, had gone through production hassles notably after the lead heroine Nila had a spat with the producers and delayed the film's shoot. The film opened to negative reviews and became a failure commercially. Shiva Shanmugam's Thagapansamy which featured Prashanth in the role of a village do-gooder, with Pooja and Namitha in other pivotal characters. The film opened to below average collections and average reviews from critics, though Sify.com noted to "watch the film for the one-man-show of Prashanth, as he is the only silver lining in a film with a confused and confounded plot." His final release of the year was debutant director's Bhuvanaraja's Adaikalam, a family drama which had been completed the previous year, gained positive reviews but the low key nature of the release hampered any chance of a successful box-office run. Featuring no lead heroine, the film told the tale of an estranged family with Thiagarajan, Saranya and Uma also in the cast and a critic noted that "as a brother and a bitter son, Prashanth has churned out what is arguably one of his better performances till date."

=== Professional fluctuations (2011–2019) ===
Prashanth had no film releases until 2011, but was involved in the production of two heavily delayed films during the period – Ponnar Shankar and Mambattiyan. The actor also invested in business opportunities, opening a 12-floor jewellery store in T Nagar, Chennai in 2008. In early 2007, Thiagarajan approached Karunanidhi with the intention of making a film on his adaptation of the Ponnar Shankar epic that he had written in the late 1970s. The latter accepted Thiagarajan's offer and approved of his decision to cast Prashanth in the dual lead roles. The film's grand production and shoot continued for over three years, and the film had a theatrical release in April 2011. A reviewer from The Hindu noted the film an "alluring canvas", praising the opulent sets, locations, rich costumes and imposing cast, yet noted that it was "too short to negate the many loopholes". Though Prashanth's stunt acts were appreciated, the reviewer pointed out his character flaws, such as minimal expressions which were "barely a smirk" in the initial scenes, and the distinct lack of distinguishable traits between the twin characters he depicted. In September 2008, Thiagarajan announced that he would remake his successful 1983 film Malaiyoor Mambattiyan, with Prashanth portraying the lead role of a Robin Hood-esque figure. The team began filming in early 2009, and Prashanth grew his hair and put on weight for the project and the team shot in the forests of Tamil Nadu, Kerala and Karnataka. Prior to the film's release, Thiagarajan considered a possible sequel to the venture, stating he would decide after seeing the audience's response. The film opened to mixed reviews in December 2011, though Prashanth won positive reviews for his portrayal of the tribal man, with a critic from The Hindu noting the actor performed "perfectly" and as the "hero has slogged it out – it's only fair the industriousness is rewarded". The film took a good opening at the box office, but it however petered out to do average business commercially and due to its big budget, failed to recover costs.

In March 2013, it was reported that the Tamil film Naan would be remade in Hindi with Prashanth in the lead role. Despite a production delay, Thiagarajan confirmed that the film would be made during an interview in December 2018. Moreover, in November 2013, Prashanth announced that he had registered the title Jeans 2 and was completing the pre-production works of a sequel to the 1998 film. The film was set to be directed and produced by Prashanth's father Thiagarajan, who revealed that production would begin in May 2014 and that they were trying to bring members of the original team back for the venture. In January 2014, Ashok Amritraj stated that he was not involved in the sequel and questioned the viability of the project, citing that he did not believe that Prashanth and his father had the rights to make a sequel. In February 2016, Prashanth reaffirmed that the sequel was in development.

Prashanth's latest films have been synonymous with remakes, expansive press releases and long production delays. He began making Saagasam, a remake of the Telugu film Julai (2012) during 2013, but the film had a delayed release in February 2016. Throughout the production, the film went through several changes in cast and crew and opened to mixed reviews, with a critic noting "Prashanth, making a return to the screen after quite a while, gives his best, but we can't help but feel that this required an even younger hero" and "what lets the film down the most is that it is directed without any feel for the material, so we are unsure if we need to take the film seriously or as a spoof". During 2014 and 2015, he worked on the proposed remake of the Hindi film Special 26 (2013), and despite several press announcements unveiling updates and proposed cast members, the film was later transferred to a different production team. In early 2017, Prashanth worked on the thriller film Johnny, a remake of the Hindi film Johnny Gaddaar (2007). The film went through changes in cast before being released in December 2018 to mixed reviews from critics and a below average opening at the box office. A comeback to Telugu films through a supporting role in Vinaya Vidheya Rama (2019) was also unsuccessful, with the film garnering negative reviews and having a poor performance commercially. Prashanth also began working on the remake of Andhadhun (2018) in August 2019.

=== Comeback (2024–present) ===
After years of production delays, the film, titled Andhagan, released in August 2024 to generally positive reviews, with many branding it as his long-overdue comeback. His next film was director Venkat Prabhu's The Greatest of All Time, starring Vijay in the lead. In 2025, Prashanth was signed on to act in a film directed by Hari; however the film did not materialise. As of 2026, Prashanth is attached to star in Ranjan - The Advocate, a remake of the Telugu film Court: State vs a Nobody.

== Personal life ==
On 1 September 2005, Prashanth married V. D. Grahalakshmi and they have one son, born in 2006. The couple parted ways after three years, when he discovered that she had been married previously, but had suppressed that information from him before their marriage. Their marriage was subsequently annulled.

== Awards ==
- Kalaimamani Award - 1998

== Filmography ==
- All films are in Tamil, unless otherwise noted.

List of Prashanth film credits
Year	Title	Role	Notes	Ref.
1990	Vaigasi Poranthachu	Kumaresan		
1991	Perumthachan	Kannan Viswakarman	Malayalam film	
1991	Nadodi Kadhal	Unknown	Unreleased film	
1992	Vanna Vanna Pookkal	Sivasubramani		
1992	I Love You	Kishen	Hindi film	
1992	Chembaruthi	Raja Rathnam		
1992	Unakkaga Piranthen	Krishna		
1992	Prema Sikharam	Prashanth	Telugu film	
1992	Laati	Srinivas	Telugu film	
1993	Enga Thambi	Pichumani		
1993	Tholi Muddhu	Prashanth	Telugu film	
1993	Thiruda Thiruda	Azhagu		
1993	Kizhakke Varum Paattu	Moorthy		
1994	Anokha Premyudh	Prashanth	Hindi film	
1994	Raasamahan	Prabhakaran		
1994	Kanmani	Raja		
1994	Sendhamizh Selvan	Selvan		
1995	Aanazhagan	Raja / Rajalakshmi alias Lucky		
1996	Kalloori Vaasal	Sathya		
1996	Krishna	Krishna		
1997	Mannava	Eashwar		
1998	Jeans	Vishwanathan, Ramamoorthy (Note: Prashanth played two characters.)		
1998	Kannedhirey Thondrinal	Vasanth		
1998	Kaadhal Kavithai	Vishwa		
1999	Poomagal Oorvalam	Saravanan		
1999	Jodi	Kannan		
1999	Hello	Chandru		
1999	Aasaiyil Oru Kadidham	Karthik		
2000	Good Luck	Surya		
2000	Appu	Appu		
2000	Parthen Rasithen	Shankar		
2001	Piriyadha Varam Vendum	Sanjay		
2001	Star	Moorthy		
2001	Chocklet	Aravindan		
2001	Majunu	Vasanth		
2002	Thamizh	Thamizh		
2002	Virumbukiren	Sivan		
2003	Winner	Sakthi		
2004	Jai	Jaya		
2004	Shock	Vasanth		
2005	Aayudham	Siva		
2005	London	Sivaraman		
2006	Jambhavan	Velan (Jambhavan) (Note: Prashanth played a single character with two or more names.)		
2006	Thagapansamy	Kathirvel		
2006	Adaikalam	Anbu		
2011	Ponnar Shankar	Ponnar, Shankar		
2011	Mambattiyan	Mambattiyan		
2015	Pulan Visaranai 2	Sabarathinam		
2016	Saagasam	Ravi		
2018	Johnny	Shakthi (Johnny)		
2019	Vinaya Vidheya Rama	Konidela Bhuvan Kumar	Telugu film	
2024	Andhagan	Krishna a.k.a. Krish		
2024	The Greatest of All Time	Sunil Thiagarajan		
2026	Ranjan – The Advocate	Advocate Ranjan	Filming	

=== As singer ===
List of Prashanth film credits as a singer
Year	Title	Song(s)	Composer
2000	Parthen Rasithen	"Vaa Endrathu Ulagam"	Bharadwaj

=== As producer ===
Year	Title
2016	Saagasam
