= Olavina Udugore =

- VCD cover
- Directed by: D. Rajendra Babu
- Written by: D. Rajendra Babu
- Produced by: M Raman; D Rajendra Babu; N. R. Shashikala; Padma; D. V. Sudheendra; Vasantha; N. Ramamurthy
- Starring: Ambareesh, Ilavarasi(Manjula Sharma)Ramakrishna; Leelavathi
- Cinematography: Kulashekar
- Edited by: K. Balu
- Music by: M. Ranga Rao
- Production company: Sri Ashtalakshmi Chithralaya
- Release date: 1987
- Running time: 142 minutes
- Country: India
- Language: Kannada

Olavina Udugore is a 1987 Indian Kannada-language film directed, written and co-produced by D. Rajendra Babu. The film stars Ambareesh, Manjula Sharma and Ramakrishna. The music was composed by M. Ranga Rao and the script was written by B. L. Venu.

== Cast ==
- Ambareesh as Suresh
- Manjula Sharma as Suma/Uma (Dual Role)
- Ramakrishna as Ramesh
- Leelavathi as Rathnamma
- Keerthiraj as Prathap
- Balakrishna as Raganna
- Dinesh as Shridhara Raya
- N. S. Rao as Baalu
- Umashree as Baby
- Shanthamma

== Soundtrack ==
Olavina Udugore

Soundtrack album by M. Ranga Rao
- Released: 1986
- Genre: Feature film soundtrack
- Length: 22:04
- Label: Sangeetha

All songs were composed by M. Ranga Rao, with lyrics by R. N. Jayagopal and Shyamasundara Kulkarni. The album consists of five tracks. The title song will recreated for his son's debut film Amar

Tracklist
No.	Title	Lyrics	Singer(s)	Length
1.	"Olavina Udugore"	R. N. Jayagopal	Jayachandran	3:58
2.	"Olavina Udugore (Duet Version)"	R. N. Jayagopal	Jayachandran, P. Susheela	4:00
3.	"Kannige Kaanada"	R. N. Jayagopal	S. P. Balasubrahmanyam	4:12
4.	"Ninnantha Cheluveyanu"	Shyamasundara Kulkarni	S. P. Balasubrahmanyam	5:04
5.	"Hrudaya Miditha"	Shyamasundara Kulkarni	S. P. Balasubrahmanyam, Vani Jairam	4:50
Total length:				22:04

== Awards ==
- Filmfare Award for Best Actor - Kannada - Ambareesh
