= Shock (2004 film) =

- Poster
- Directed by: Thiagarajan
- Screenplay by: Thiagarajan; Lalit Marathe; Sameer Sharma
- Based on: Bhoot by Ram Gopal Varma
- Produced by: Thiagarajan
- Starring: Prashanth; Meena; Abbas; Thiagarajan
- Cinematography: M. V. Panneerselvam
- Edited by: P. Sai Suresh
- Music by: Salim–Sulaiman
- Distributed by: Lakshmi Shanthi Movies; Kalasangham Films
- Release date: 23 July 2004
- Running time: 120 minutes
- Country: India
- Language: Tamil

Shock is a 2004 Indian Tamil-language supernatural horror film directed and produced by Thiagarajan. The film stars his son Prashanth and Meena, while Abbas, Thiagarajan, Suhasini, Kalairani, and Sarath Babu, among others played the supporting roles. The music is composed by Salim–Sulaiman. It is a remake of the Hindi film Bhoot (2003), and was released on 23 July 2004. The film received a positive response from critics and was a box office success.

== Plot ==
The film revolves around Vasanth, a stock analyst, and his wife Malini. The two are in search of a flat in Chennai. Vasanth finds the perfect place on the 12th floor of a high-rise apartment building.

However, the apartment has a horrifying past. The previous occupant of the flat, Manju, killed her child and then jumped from the balcony and died. Malini learns about this incident and becomes oddly fixated with the story. Then, a series of inexplicable experiences drives her to near madness. Vasanth is convinced that she has developed some sort of psychological disorder. He consults a psychiatrist named Dr. Rajan and begins to doubt that his wife is suffering from a psychological disease. The couple's maid believes Malini to be possessed and calls in an exorcist.

Meanwhile, seemingly unrelated events take place around the building: the watchman was murdered with his head completely twisted; one of the residents, Ajay, behaves erratically; and a murder occurs. Inspector Paramasivam is sent to investigate the murder.

The exorcist spends time with Malini and learns that she is possessed by Manju. Vasanth goes to Manju's mother, and with her help, the possessed Malini lets everyone know that Ajay lusted after Manju and raped her, and to save herself, she jumped from her balcony. Later, Ajay realised that her daughter had witnessed the murder and got the watchman to throw the little girl from the balcony, and created a fake story that the woman had killed her daughter and then committed suicide. By killing the watchman via Malini, Manju takes revenge for her daughter's death and wants to kill Ajay. At the last minute, the mother comes and tells her dead daughter's spirit that she cannot take revenge on Ajay by making Malini a murderer, so Manju leaves Malini's body, and Ajay is thrown in front of everyone.

The story ends with Ajay going to prison and Parmasivam telling him to rot in a jail cell forever. After Paramasivam leaves the cell, Ajay finds himself face-to-face with Manju. He starts begging for mercy, but his voice fades out as she draws closer; it is implied that she kills him.

== Cast ==
- Prashanth as Vasanth
- Meena as Malini / Manju
- Abbas as Ajay
- Thiagarajan as Police Inspector Paramasivam
- Sarath Babu as Dr. Rajan
- Suhasini as Exorcist
- Devan as Dr. Shyam
- K. R. Vijaya as Manju's mother
- Kalairani as Maid

== Production ==
In October 2003, director Thiagarajan bought the Tamil remake rights of Ram Gopal Varma's 2003 Hindi supernatural thriller Bhoot in October 2003, after the original had become a box office success. Thiagarajan's son Prashanth and Simran were signed on to play the lead roles, though the actress later opted out citing her impending marriage as a reason. The team then announced that actress Reema Sen had replaced Simran in the film, though Sen called the statement "premature". Reports then suggested that Laila had replaced her though this proved to be untrue. The leading female role was later taken by Meena, who lost weight to portray the role which she described as her "most challenging" role to that point.

An early press release had announced that Asin, Khushbu, Ramya Krishnan, Raghuvaran and Pasupathy would also be in the film, but none of the actors eventually starred. Similarly Kanika and Sujatha were initially speculated to appear in the film, but did not make the final cast. Abbas joined the cast to play a negative role, while K. R. Vijaya, Suhasini and Sarath Babu were also selected to essay supporting roles. Subtle changes were made to the script of the Tamil version to make it adaptable for Tamil audiences. During production, Thiagarajan revealed that the team hoped to introduce a new form of technology which would prevent the film being seen on unlicensed copies. The film's shoot was completed within twenty six days, with meticulous pre-planning arranged by Thiagarajan. The makers also considered producing a Kannada and Malayalam version of the film, but eventually did not carry through with the idea.

== Release ==
Shock was released on 23 July 2004. After watching the film in a Chennai theatre, a 50-year old man suffered a heart attack and was hospitalised but recovered. He was visited by Prashanth and Thiagarajan, and the former told the media, "We had made it clear in the publicity of Shock that the film is not for people with weak hearts nor for children". There were also reports of audiences watching the film in Sathyam Cinemas being "jolted" at regular intervals due to its relatively powerful sound system compared to that of other theatres in Chennai.

== Critical reception ==
Malathi Rangarajan of The Hindu wrote, "Even at the outset director Thiagarajan has to be congratulated upon for not hampering the tempo with the usual frills of solos and song and dance routines", though she added " the film doesn't frighten you as much as they said it would". Sify's reviewer credited Meena's performance noting "watching her work up a maniacal frenzy or slip into a pathetic state of helplessness, only to let out a deathly scream, is an experience not worth missing". Malini Mannath of Chennai Online wrote, "You have to hand it to Thiagarajan that he has not tampered with the original, but remained faithful to it while adapting it to Tamil, and maintained the same ambience, slickness and pace of the original throughout". G. Ulaganathan of Deccan Herald wrote "In the first half an hour, the director succeeds in creating a sense of terror but is unable to sustain it till the end, Cinematographer Pannerselvam’s brilliant camerwork as well as Salim Sulaiman’s background score ladds to the scary effects".

== See also ==
- List of ghost films
- List of Indian films without songs
