= Doddarasinakere =

Village in Mandya, Karnataka

- Village
- Location in Karnataka, India Doddarasinakere (India)
- Coordinates: 12.508300°N 77.0200400°E
- Country: India
- State: Karnataka
- District: Mandya
- Talukas: Maddur

Government
  - Body: Grama Panchayath

Area
  - Total: 18.40 km^{2} (7.10 sq mi)
- Elevation: 642 m (2,106 ft)

Population (2011)
  - Total: 9,541
  - Density: 518.5/km^{2} (1,343/sq mi)

Languages
  - Official: Kannada
- Time zone: UTC+5:30 (IST)
- Postal code: 571422

Doddarasinakere is a village in the southern state of Karnataka, India. It is located in the Maddur taluk of Mandya district in Karnataka. Its location code number as per 2011 census is 614621.

== Etymology ==
The name Doddarasinakere has its roots from King Doddarasaru.

== Demographics ==
As of 2010 India census, Doddarasinakere had a population of 9392 with 4824 males and 4568 females.

== Notable people ==
- Ambareesh - actor and politician
- D. C. Tammanna - former Minister in the government of Karnataka

== See also ==
- Mandya
- Districts of Karnataka
