= Police Lockup =

- Directed by: K. V. Raju
- Written by: K. V. Raju
- Screenplay by: K. V. Raju
- Produced by: M. Rajendra; N. Kumar
- Starring: Arjun Sarja; Thiagarajan; Kavya; Vinaya Prasad
- Cinematography: Padma Kumar
- Edited by: S. Prasad
- Music by: V. Manohar
- Production company: Sri Lakshmi Films
- Release date: 29 September 1992
- Country: India
- Language: Kannada

Police Lockup is a 1992 Indian Kannada-language film, directed by K. V. Raju and produced by M. Rajendra and N. Kumar. The film stars Arjun Sarja, Thiagarajan, Kavya, and Vinaya Prasad. The film has a musical score by V. Manohar.

== Cast ==
- Arjun Sarja
- Thiagarajan
- Kavya
- Vinaya Prasad
- Doddanna
- Lohithaswa
- Avinash
- Ashok Rao
- Tennis Krishna
- Sathyajith
- Dombara Krishna Suresh
- Jolly Bastin

== Soundtrack ==
=== Kannada Version ===
The soundtrack was composed and lyrics were written by V. Manohar.

Track list
No.	Title	Singer(s)	Length
1.	"Akasha Bhumiyella"	S. P. Balasubrahmanyam	4:40
2.	"Akasha Bhumiyella - Sad"	S. P. Balasubrahmanyam	4:38
3.	"Ayyayyo Kettu Hoyithu"	S. P. Balasubrahmanyam	4:22
4.	"Hima Hima Manjina"	S. P. Balasubrahmanyam, Sheela Krishnamurthy	4:20
5.	"Jumma Chekka"	S. P. Balasubrahmanyam, S. Janaki	4:37
Total length:			22:37

=== Telugu Version (Gharana Inspector) ===
The film was dubbed into Telugu as Gharana Inspector. The soundtrack was composed by V. Manohar and all lyrics were written by Rajasri.

Track list
No.	Title	Singer(s)	Length
1.	"Ayyayyo Chedipoindi"	S. P. Balasubrahmanyam	4:40
2.	"Mucchataina Muddu Gumma"	S. P. Balasubrahmanyam, K. S. Chithra	4:41
3.	"Idhe Idhe Makarandle"	S. P. Balasubrahmanyam, K. S. Chithra	3:50
4.	"Aakasham Bhoomi"	K. S. Chithra	2:06
5.	"Aakasham Bhoomi (Sad)"	K. S. Chithra	2:39
Total length:			17:58
