= Komberi Mookan =

- Poster
- Directed by: A. Jagannathan
- Screenplay by: A. L. Narayanan
- Story by: Thiagarajan
- Produced by: S. Gopinath
- Starring: Thiagarajan; Saritha; Urvashi
- Cinematography: P. Ganesa Pandiyan
- Edited by: R. Devarajan
- Music by: Ilaiyaraaja
- Production company: Lakshmi Shanthi Movies
- Release date: 15 June 1984
- Country: India
- Language: Tamil

Komberi Mookan (transl. Bronzeback Tree Snake) is a 1984 Indian Tamil-language action drama film directed by A. Jagannathan. The film stars Thiagarajan, Saritha and Urvashi. It was released on 15 June 1984.

== Plot ==
Mookan, a young boy, lives with his parents in a village. Alavanthar is a wealthy and influential person in the village. He is also a womaniser. One night, he forcibly enters Mookan’s house and rapes his mother and with the help of his henchmen kills and burns his father. His mother initially attempts suicide but changes her mind upon seeing the boy and vows to raise him to be a strong and ethical man who will avenge the injustice committed by Alavanthar.

The boy is made to wear a hair bun on his head as a vow to fulfill the duties of revenge and hence he is given the name Komberi Mookan. He grows up to become a strong man and his mother on her deathbed informs him about the sins committed by Alavanthar and asks him to take revenge. How he proceeds to do that forms the rest of the story.

== Cast ==
- Thiagarajan as Komberi Mookan
- Saritha
- Urvashi
- Senthamarai
- Jayanthi
- Goundamani
- Thengai Srinivasan
- Delhi Ganesh
- Idichapuli Selvaraj
- Bindu Ghosh
- Senthil
- S. N. Lakshmi

== Production ==
The song "Ellame Nallapadi" and a fight sequence at a market was shot at Saradha Studios.

== Soundtrack ==
The soundtrack was composed by Ilaiyaraaja. The song "Roja Ondru Mutham Ketkum", set to the Carnatic raga Bageshri, is reused from "Theeram Thedi Olam Padi" from the 1984 Malayalam film Unaroo.

Song	Singers	Lyrics
Ellame Nallapadi	Malaysia Vasudevan	Vaali
Gana Gana	S. Janaki, Malaysia Vasudevan	Gangai Amaran
Oonjal Manam	P. Jayachandran, S. Janaki	Vaali
Roja Ondru	S. P. Balasubrahmanyam, S. Janaki	Vairamuthu

== Critical reception ==
Jayamanmadhan of Kalki praised the acting of actors and called it a routine revenge tale. Balumani of Anna found the plot similar to Thyagarajan's Malaiyoor Mambattiyan and felt the scope of female character from that film is missing here but praised the acting, music, cinematography and direction.
