= Kerala People's Party =

- Leader: S. Devan
- Chairman: S. Devan
- Founder: S. Devan
- Founded: 21 March 2004
- Merged into: BJP
- Succeeded by: Nava Kerala People's Party
- Headquarters: Thiruvananthapuram (India)
- Ideology: Nationalism
- Seats in Lok Sabha: 0
- Seats in Rajya Sabha: 0

Kerala People's Party was a political party in the Indian state of Kerala, led by actor S. Devan. It was formed on 2004. Devan contested in two Kerala Legislative Assembly elections as an independent candidate however lost both the election, in 2004 and 2006. It was relaunched as Nava Kerala People's Party in 2020. The party merged with BJP on 7 March 2021.
