= Dhinarathrangal =

- Directed by: Joshi
- Written by: Dennis Joseph
- Produced by: S. V. Krishna Reddy
- Starring: Mammootty; Sumalatha; Mukesh; Parvathi; Siddique
- Cinematography: Jayanan Vincent
- Edited by: K. Shankunny
- Music by: Ouseppachan (songs); Shyam (BGM)
- Release date: 21 January 1988
- Country: India
- Language: Malayalam

Dhinarathrangal (transl. Days and Nights) is a 1988 Indian Malayalam-language film written by Dennis Joseph, directed by Joshi and produced by S. V. Krishna Reddy and starring Mammootty, Sumalatha and Mukesh. The score and soundtrack were composed by Shyam. The film was inspired by the Hindi film Achanak (1973).

== Cast ==
- Mammootty as Aravindan
- Sumalatha as Dr. Savithri
- Mukesh as Ajayan
- Parvathy as Treesa
- Siddique as Sudhindran, Farm Labourer
- Prathapachandran as Doctor Bharghavan Nair
- Devan as Unni
- Karamana Janardanan Nair as Sankarath Madhava Menon
- Babu Namboothiri as Thomachan
- Rohini as Ponni
- Philomina as Latha, Aravindan's Mother
- Sukumari as Lakshmi
- Jose Prakash as Commissioner Unnithan
- Jagannatha Varma as Balakrishnan, Madhava Menon's Brother-in-law
- Vijayaraghavan as Sasi
- Ganesh Kumar as Chekutty
- Mohan Jose
- Azeez as Minister Shivaraman
- Baiju as Biju
- Santha Devi as Naniyamma
- Jagannathan
- Kunchan as Hospital Attendant

== Release ==
The film was released on 21 January 1988.

=== Box office ===
The film was a critical success.

== Songs ==
There is only one song in the film, "Thirunellikkadu Poothu". It was written by Shibu Chakravarthy, composed by Ouseppachan and sung by M. G. Sreekumar and K. S. Chithra. The song was shot by writer Dennis Joseph and features Mukesh and Parvathy.
