= Poovukkul Boogambam =

1988 film by Thiagarajan

- Poster
- Directed by: Thiagarajan
- Written by: Thiagarajan; Muthubharathi (dialogues)
- Produced by: Thiagarajan
- Starring: Thiagarajan; Parvathy
- Cinematography: Gopinath
- Edited by: Sivasubramanian
- Music by: Sangeetharajan
- Production company: Lakshmi Shanti Movies
- Distributed by: Lakshmi Shanti Movies
- Release date: 13 April 1988
- Country: India
- Language: Tamil

Poovukkul Boogambam (transl. An earthquake within the flower) is a 1988 Indian Tamil-language action war film written, produced and directed by Thiagarajan, making his directorial debut. The film stars himself and Parvathy alongside B. Saroja Devi and Charan Raj in supporting roles. The soundtrack was composed by S. P. Venkatesh, credited as Sangeetharajan. The film was released on 13 April 1988.

== Cast ==
- Thiagarajan as Bharath
- Parvathy as Shanthi
- B. Saroja Devi
- Charan Raj
- Janagaraj
- Senthil
- Silk Smitha
- Jayamalini
- Sangeeta
- Sujitha

== Production ==
The film marked the production and directorial debut of Thiagarajan who also appeared in the lead role. Inspired by an article of real-life military officer Sundarji, Thiagarajan decided to write a script on it. Thiagarajan held the shooting in an army camp near Faizabad along with nearly 3,500 soldiers and also shot at military centres near New Delhi, and also at Chennai, Agra and Srinagar after obtaining permission from the Indian Army. Khushbu was originally chosen as the lead actress, but she was later replaced by Parvathy.

== Soundtrack ==
The soundtrack was composed by S. P. Venkatesh, credited as Sangeetharajan. M. G. Ramachandran, then the Chief Minister of Tamil Nadu, released the audio of the film.

Track listing
No.	Title	Lyrics	Singer(s)	Length
1.	"Anbe Oru Aasai"	Gangai Amaran	S. P. Balasubrahmanyam	4:41
2.	"Naal Naal Varudhu"	Pulamaipithan	Uma Ramanan	4:14
3.	"Naadu Adhe"	Vairamuthu	S. P. Balasubrahmanyam	5:05
4.	"Oru Kaalam"	Pulamaipithan	K. J. Yesudas	4:58
5.	"Thethi Sollattuma Chinnaval Naan"	Valampuri John	K. S. Chithra	4:16
6.	"Thaali Seiyattuma"	Vairamuthu	S. P. Balasubrahmanyam, K. S. Chithra	4:16
Total length:				27:30

== Release and reception ==
Poovukkul Boogambam was released on 13 April 1988, and distributed by Lakshmi Shanti Movies. N. Krishnaswamy of The Indian Express in his review dated 15 April 1988 noted that Thiagarajan is accountable for the film's merits and drawbacks and also stated the script "is very clearly unable to cope up with the conflict [sic]". He however appreciated the film's music and photography. Jayamanmadhan of Kalki wrote that, by taking an average plot and adding the word Army Army before every sentence of the story, Thiagarajan has made an earthquake within the flower. The film ran for over 100 days in theatres.
