= New Delhi (1987 film) =

1987 film by Joshiy

- Poster
- Directed by: Joshiy
- Written by: Dennis Joseph
- Produced by: Joy Thomas
- Starring: Mammootty; Suresh Gopi; Thiagarajan; Sumalatha; Urvashi; Devan; Vijayaraghavan; Mohan Jose
- Cinematography: Jayanan Vincent
- Edited by: K. Sankunni
- Music by: Shyam
- Production company: Jubilee Productions
- Distributed by: Jubilee Productions
- Release date: 24 July 1987
- Running time: 143 minutes
- Country: India
- Language: Malayalam

New Delhi is a 1987 Malayalam language neo-noir thriller film written by Dennis Joseph and directed by Joshiy and produced by Joy Thomas. It stars Mammootty, Suresh Gopi, Thiagarajan, Sumalatha, Urvashi, Siddique, Vijayaraghavan, Mohan Jose, Devan, and Jagannatha Varma.

The film was remade and released in Telugu as Anthima Theerpu, which was directed by Joshiy himself. Joshiy also directed the Hindi and Kannada versions titled New Delhi. Lead roles were played by Jeetendra in its Hindi version and Ambareesh in the Kannada version, respectively, Gopi made his debuts in the Telugu, Kannada and Hindi film Industries through the remakes in those languages but he played different roles. The story is loosely based on the novel The Almighty by Irving Wallace.

Thiagarajan, who played the role of Salem Vishnu in New Delhi, later produced and directed a Tamil film titled Salem Vishnu which showcased the prequel story of his character. The film rose Mammootty to Mega Star status after consecutive failures in the early 80s. The film was a critical and commercial success and the highest-grossing Malayalam film at that time. It earned cult status and is considered one of the best Malayalam films ever made.

== Cast ==
- Mammootty as G. Krishnamoorthy aka G.K
- Suresh Gopi as Suresh
- Thiagarajan as Nataraj Vishnu/Salem Vishnu
- Sumalatha as Maria Fernandez
- Urvashi as Uma
- Devan as Shankar
- Jagannatha Varma as C.R. Panikkar
- Prathapachandran as Jailor
- Vijayaraghavan as Ananthan
- Siddique as Siddique
- Mohan Jose as Appu
- P. K. Abraham as Fernandez, Maria's Father
- K. K. Padmanabhan as Policeman

== Production ==
The film was shot in New Delhi.

== Remake ==
The movie was remade into three different languages such as Telugu, Hindi & Kannada by Joshiy himself.

Year	Film	Language	Cast	Director
1988	Antima Teerpu	Telugu	Krishnamraju, Thiagarajan, Sumalatha, Urvashi, Prabhakar Reddy, Ranganath	Joshiy
1988	New Delhi	Hindi	Jeetendra, Sumalatha, Urvashi, Raza Murad, Thiagarajan	Joshiy
1988	New Delhi	Kannada	Ambareesh, Sumalatha, Urvashi, Thiagarajan	Joshiy

== Release ==
The film released on 24 July 1987. It was a commercial success at the box office. New Delhi became the highest-grossing Malayalam film at that time. New Delhi making a box office collection of ₹ 2.5 crore in Kerala box office. The film ran for over a hundred days in Ernakulam center. and also was the first Malayalam film to run over 100 days in 2 centers in Tamil Nadu box office.
