= Senthamizh Selvan =

1994 film by Manoj Kumar

- Poster
- Directed by: Manoj Kumar
- Written by: Manoj Kumar; Sivaram Gandhi (dialogues)
- Produced by: M. S. V. Murali
- Starring: Prashanth; Madhoo
- Cinematography: Lakshmi Balan
- Edited by: Cedric Mani
- Music by: M. S. Viswanathan; Ilaiyaraaja
- Production company: Shree Vijayalakshmi Movieland
- Release date: 12 August 1994
- Running time: 140 minutes
- Country: India
- Language: Tamil

Senthamizh Selvan (transl. Pure Tamil rich man) is a 1994 Indian Tamil-language action drama film, written and directed by Manoj Kumar. The film stars Prashanth and Madhoo in the lead roles, while music was given by M. S. Viswanathan and Ilaiyaraaja as a team. It was released on 12 August 1994.

== Plot ==
Vijay Bhoopathy and Sundarapandian have been friends. Bhoopathy is an atheist, while Sundarapandian is a temple priest. Bhoopathy's son Selvan and Sundarapandian's daughter Vaidegi fall in love with each other. Muthukalai is Vijayakumar's brother-in-law. His daughter Meenakshi is also madly in love and vows to marry Selvan. Against their families' wishes, Prashanth and Madhoo elope. Ever since, the two families hate each other. Later, Bhoopathy is murdered in front of his wife Janaki, who becomes mentally sick from the shock. Selvan comes to the village, announces that he is the son of Bhoopathy and tries to treat his mentally affected mother. Sundarapandian tries to kill Selvan to claim the huge property left by Prashanth's father. How Selvan saves the mother, property and how he marries Madhoo forms the rest of the story.

== Cast ==
- Prashanth as Selvan
- Madhoo as Vaidegi
- Sivaranjani as Meenakshi
- Sujatha as Janaki
- Vijayakumar as Zamindar Vijay Bhoopathy
- Mohan Natrajan as Sundarapandian
- Chandrasekhar as Muthukalai
- Shanmugasundaram as Shanmugasundaram
- Senthil as Vellaichamy
- Charle

== Soundtrack ==
The songs were composed by M. S. Viswanathan, while orchestration and BGM were composed by Ilaiyaraaja, with lyrics written by Vaali.

Song	Singer(s)
"Rathiri Pozhuthu"	S. P. Balasubrahmanyam, K. S. Chithra
"Thaikulame"	K. S. Chithra
"Pattu Esa Pattu"	S. P. Balasubrahmanyam
"Odunga Kalaikala"	M. Vasu
"Kuyile Ilaman"	S. P. Balasubrahmanyam
"Machan Ennai"	Swarnalatha
"Koodu Enge"	S. P. Balasubrahmanyam, K. S. Chithra

== Reception ==
K. Vijiyan of New Straits Times criticised the film for its abundance of songs, adding, "I have lost count of the numerous movies where one man reigns over a village using violence and there seems to be no law or order. Sadly, [Senthamizh Selvan] is another film in this genre, with nothing much to make it memorable or outstanding". Thulasi of Kalki wrote except for cinematography and art direction, the film has nothing else to talk about.
