= Raasamahan =

1994 film directed by Manivannan

- VCD cover
- Directed by: Manivannan
- Screenplay by: Manivannan
- Story by: Seeman
- Produced by: M. Veda
- Starring: Prashanth; Sivaranjani
- Cinematography: D. Shankar
- Edited by: P. Venkateshwara Rao
- Music by: Ilaiyaraaja
- Production company: M. S. R. Films
- Release date: 8 April 1994
- Running time: 155 minutes
- Country: India
- Language: Tamil

Raasamahan (transl. Son of Raasa) is a 1994 Indian Tamil-language romantic drama film written and directed by Manivannan from a story by Seeman. The film stars Prashanth and Sivaranjani. It was released on 8 April 1994, and became a box office failure.

== Cast ==
- Prashanth as Prabhakaran
- Sivaranjani as Selvi
- Chandrasekhar as Chellachamy (voice dubbed by Dhamu)
- Rekha as Chellachamy's wife
- Vinu Chakravarthy as Chellachamy's father
- Jai Ganesh as Prabhakaran's father
- Srividya as Prabhakaran's mother
- R. Sundarrajan as Appachi
- Manivannan as Aandai
- Halwa Vasu as Aandai's sidekick
- Manobala as Broker (guest appearance)

== Soundtrack ==
The soundtrack was composed by Ilaiyaraaja and lyrics were written by Vaali. The song "Kaathirunthen Thaniye" is set to the Carnatic raga Mohanam. The song "Anjugajam Kanchipattu" was originally composed for Amaidhipadai (1994).

| Song | Singer(s) | Duration |
|---|---|---|
| "Anju Kajam Kanji Pattu" | S. P. Balasubrahmanyam, S. Janaki | 04:48 |
| "Kaathirunthen Thaniye" | Surendar, Chitra | 05:04 |
| "Pombala Velaiya" | S. P. Balasubrahmanyam, S. Janaki | 05:06 |
| "Thuli Mani Thulie" | Sunandha | 04:58 |
| "Vaikasi Vellikilama" | S. P. Balasubrahmanyam | 04:54 |
