= Antima Teerpu (1988 film) =

- Theatrical poster
- Directed by: Joshiy
- Written by: Jandhyala (dialogues)
- Screenplay by: Dennis Joseph
- Story by: Dennis Joseph
- Based on: New Delhi (Malayalam)(1987)
- Produced by: Magunta Sovarulu
- Starring: Krishnam Raju; Suresh Gopi; Thiagarajan; Sumalatha
- Cinematography: Jayanan Vincent
- Edited by: K. Sankunni
- Music by: Shyam
- Production company: Kalyani Films
- Release date: 18 March 1988
- Running time: 151 minutes
- Country: India
- Language: Telugu

Antima Teerpu (transl. The Final Verdict) is a 1988 Indian Telugu-language film directed by Joshiy and starring Krishnam Raju, Suresh Gopi, Thiagarajan and Sumalatha. It was a remake of the director's own Malayalam film, New Delhi, which was loosely based on the novel, The Almighty, written by Irving Wallace.

== Synopsis ==
The film revolves around a journalist, who is on a mission to end the menace of anti-social elements in the society.

== Cast ==
- Krishnam Raju as GK aka G. Krishna Moorti
- Suresh Gopi as Suresh
- Thiagarajan as Nataraj Vishnu aka Salem Vishnu
- Sumalatha as Vasanta
- Prabhakar Reddy as Party President Govind Chowdhary
- Ranganath as Home Minister Shankar
- Urvashi as Uma
- Siddique
- Vijayaraghavan
- Sankarada Aravind
- Mohan Jose
- Gummadi as Jailor

== Production and release ==
It is the only Telugu film to be entirely shot in Delhi. The film was a box office success.
