= Thiagarajan =

Indian actor

Thiyagarajan kola
- Born: Thiyagarajan Sivanandam; 21 June 1946 (age 80); Vilathur, Tamil Nadu, India
- Occupations: Actor; Film director; Film producer; Businessman; Screenwriter; Art director
- Years active: 1980 – present
- Spouse: Shanthi (m. 1972)
- Children: Prashanth, Preethi
- Relatives: Peketi Sivaram (Father-in-law); Vikram (Nephew)

Thiagarajan Sivanandam (born 21 June 1946) is an Indian actor, director and producer in Tamil cinema. Besides Tamil, he has acted in several Malayalam, Kannada, Telugu and Hindi films. He is the father of Tamil actor Prashanth, son-in-law of actor-director Peketi Sivaram and the maternal uncle of Tamil actor Vikram.

== Career ==
Originally a businessman, Thiagarajan made his acting debut with Alaigal Oivathillai (1981), appearing as the elder brother of the film's lead actress Radha. The film became successful and offers poured in for him.

His portrayal of a jungle bandit in Malaiyoor Mambattiyan (1982) provided him a major breakthrough in his career. He was part of such successful films as Komberi Mookan (1984) and Neengal Kettavai (1984).

He acted in the Malayalam film New Delhi, which became successful and his portrayal of a goon received acclaim. The success of the film prompted Thiagarajan to make his directorial debut titled Salem Vishnu (1990), based on the character which he had played in that film. He then directed Aanazhagan (1995), with his son Prashanth in the leading role. According to Prashanth, the film was an average grosser.

Thiagarajan then stayed away from the limelight, paving the way for his son. He later returned to acting, appearing in a small role as a father to his son in Jai. Thiagarajan then directed Shock, remake of the Hindi film Bhoot in 2004. Apart from directing and producing the film, Thiagarajan handled the art and costumes department and also appeared in the film as police inspector. The film's shoot was completed in twenty-six days, with meticulous pre-planning arranged by Thiagarajan. The film received positive reviews citing that the makers "deserve an appreciation for his honest and sincere attempt on the screen".

In September 2004, Thiagarajan launched Police, a remake of the Hindi film Khakee and the film received coverage from the media after producers had approached Amitabh Bachchan and Aishwarya Rai for key roles. In interviews during the period, Thiagarajan mentioned the grand scale of the project, citing that schedules would also be shot abroad; however the film failed to progress. He then returned to acting with the films Body Guard (2010) and Drohi (2010).

In early 2007, Thiagarajan approached M. Karunanidhi with the intention of making a film on his adaptation of the Ponnar Shankar epic that he had written in the late 1970s. The latter accepted Thiagarajan's offer and approved of his decision to cast his son Prashanth, in the dual lead role. The film was released in 2011 to mixed reviews and did average business. He directed Mambattiyan (2011), a remake of his successful 1983 film in which he had acted. His son played the title role. The film received mixed reviews by critics, it took a good opening at the box office, but petered out to do average business commercially and due to its big budget, it failed to recover costs. In 2014, he revealed that he would direct the remakes of Hindi films Special 26 and Queen in four south Indian languages; although he did not remake those films.

He later starred in supporting roles such as Vaaimai (2016), Yaman (2018), Chekka Chivantha Vaanam (2018), Ponmagal Vandhal (2020) and PT Sir (2024). He is a producer of his son's films Saagasam (2016), Johnny (2018) and Andhagan (2024).

== Filmography ==
=== Tamil films ===
Year	Title	Role	Notes
1981	Alaigal Oivathillai	David	
1981	Tik Tik Tik	Victor	
1982	Garuda Saukiyama	Muthu krishna	
1982	Nenjil Oru Ragam	Siva	
1982	Deviyin Thiruvilaiyadal	Mannar Perumane	
1982	Nadodi Raja	Muruga	
1982	Nenjangal	Kidnapper	
1982	Neram Vandhachu	Ravi	
1983	Paayum Puli	Thiyagu	
1983	Bhagavathipuram Railway Gate	Boodalingam	
1983	Malaiyoor Mambattiyan	Mambattiyaan	
1983	Ennai Paar En Azhagai Paar		
1983	Ethanai Konam Ethanai Parvai		Unreleased
1984	Nalla Naal	Kaali	
1984	Komberi Mookan	Komberi Mookan	
1984	Neengal Kettavai	Arun	
1984	Nerupukkul Eeram		
1984	Sankari	Raghu	
1985	Raja Yuvaraja	Yuvaraja	
1985	Erimalai	Shankar Dada	
1985	Kaaval	Inspector Anand	
1985	Karuppu Chattaikaran	Yuvendran	
1986	Murattu Karangal	Veeran	
1986	Machakaran		
1988	Oomai Dhurai		
1988	Poovukkul Boogambam	Bharath	
1990	Salem Vishnu	Vishnu	
1991	Theechatti Govindhan	Theechatti Govindan	
2004	Jai	Veerapandi	
2004	Shock	Police Inspector	
2006	Adaikalam	Sathyamurthy	
2010	Drohi	Narayanan	
2016	Vaaimai	Dheenadayalan	
2017	Yaman	Karunakaran	
2018	Chekka Chivantha Vaanam	Chinnappadasan	
2020	Ponmagal Vandhal	Varadharajan	
2024	PT Sir	Guru Purushothaman	
2024	Andhagan	Artist	Uncredited appearance; also director

=== Other language films ===
Year	Movie	Role	Language	Notes
1984	John Jani Janardhan	Gopaldas	Hindi	
1985	Kala Rudrudu		Telugu	
1987	New Delhi	Nataraj Vishnu a.k.a. Salem Vishnu	Malayalam	
1988	Adholokam	Nandakumar	Malayalam	
1988	Manu Uncle	Gomas	Malayalam	
1988	Oohakachavadom		Malayalam	
1988	Oru Muthassi Katha	Chemparundu Machan	Malayalam	
1988	Abkari	Chidambaram	Malayalam	
1988	Anthima Theerpu	Nataraj Vishnu a.k.a. Salem Vishnu	Telugu	
1988	New Delhi	Nataraj Vishnu a.k.a. Salem Vishnu	Hindi	
1988	New Delhi	Nataraj Vishnu a.k.a. Salem Vishnu	Kannada	
1988	Arjun Dennis		Malayalam	
1989	State Rowdy	Phanindra Bhupathi	Telugu	
1989	Miss Pameela	Victor	Malayalam	
1989	Jeevitham Oru Raagam	Raghavan	Malayalam	
1990	No.20 Madras Mail	Himself	Malayalam	Cameo appearance
1990	Magadu		Telugu	
1990	Ashoka Chakra	Soorappa	Kannada	
1991	CBI Siva		Kannada	
1991	Veera Dheera		Kannada	
1992	Marana Mrudanga	Thyagaraj	Kannada	
1992	Police Lockup		Kannada	
1993	Sangharsha		Kannada	
1994	Sididedda Shiva		Kannada	
1997	Police Bete		Kannada	
1999	Ravimama		Kannada	
1999	Vishwa	Special Commissioner D'Souza	Kannada	
2003	Thilakkam	Maheswaran Thampi	Malayalam	
2010	Body Guard	Ashokan	Malayalam	
2016	Pachakkallam		Malayalam	

=== As director, producer, writer and art director ===
Year	Title	Credited as				Language	Notes
Year	Title	Director	Producer	Writer	Art director	Language	Notes
1984	Komberi Mookan	No	No	Story	No	Tamil	
1988	Poovukkul Boogambam	Yes	Yes	Yes	No	Tamil	
1990	Salem Vishnu	Yes	Yes	Yes	No	Tamil	also lyrics for song "Mayanginen Mannan"
1995	Aanazhagan	Yes	No	Yes	No	Tamil	
1997	Mannava	No	No	No	Yes	Tamil	
2004	Shock	Yes	Yes	Screenplay	Yes	Tamil	
2004	Jai	No	Yes	No	No	Tamil	
2011	Ponnar Shankar	Yes	Yes	No	No	Tamil	
2011	Mambattiyan	Yes	Yes	Yes	Yes	Tamil	also singer for song "Kaatuvazhi"
2016	Saagasam	No	Presenter	Screenplay	No	Tamil	
2018	Johnny	No	Yes	Screenplay	No	Tamil	
2024	Andhagan	Yes	Yes	Screenplay	No	Tamil	
