= Vellam (1985 film) =

- Poster designed by P. N. Menon
- Directed by: Hariharan
- Written by: M. T. Vasudevan Nair
- Based on: N. N. Pisharody's Novel
- Produced by: Devan, T Mukundan Menon
- Starring: Prem Nazir; Madhu; K. R. Vijaya; Srividya; Sathaar; Sukumari; Adoor Bhasi; Menaka
- Cinematography: Melli Irani
- Edited by: M. S. Mani
- Music by: Songs: G. Devarajan; Background Score: Salil Chowdhury
- Production company: Sri Rajeswari Pictures
- Release date: 11 January 1985
- Country: India
- Language: Malayalam

Vellam (transl. Water) is a 1985 Indian Malayalam-language film, directed by Hariharan, starring Prem Nazir and Madhu, supported by K. R. Vijaya and Srividya, with Sathaar, Sukumari, Adoor Bhasi and Balan K. Nair playing other important roles.

The movie had songs composed by G. Devarajan and background score composed by Salil Chowdhury.

Actor Devan is the producer of Vellam. The film delayed for 5 years to be produced, which put the producer Devan in a dire financial strain.

== Cast ==
- Prem Nazir
- Madhu
- K. R. Vijaya
- Srividya
- Sathaar
- Sukumari
- Adoor Bhasi
- Menaka
- Kottayam Santha
- V. T. Aravindakshamenon
- Aranmula Ponnamma
- Bahadoor
- Balan K. Nair
- Bhaskara Kurup
- G. K. Pillai
- Kunjandi
- Oduvil Unnikrishnan
- P. K. Abraham
- Santha Devi
- William d'Cruz
- Mohanlal

== Soundtrack ==
The songs were composed by G. Devarajan and the lyrics were written by Mullanezhi.

No.	Song	Singers	Lyrics	Length (m:ss)
1	"Kannaadikkoottile"	K. J. Yesudas, Chorus	Mullanezhi	
2	"Kodanaadan Malayile"	K. J. Yesudas	Mullanezhi	
3	"Paandyaalakkadavum"	K. J. Yesudas, Chorus	Mullanezhi	
4	"Sourayoodha Padhathilenno"	K. J. Yesudas	Mullanezhi	
5	"Swarga Sankalpathin"	P. Susheela	Mullanezhi	
6	"Thakkam Thakkam Thaalamittu"	P. Madhuri, Chorus, C. O. Anto	Mullanezhi	
7	"Vaasanappoovukale"	P. Madhuri	Mullanezhi	
