= Ambareesh =

Indian Kannada actor, politician

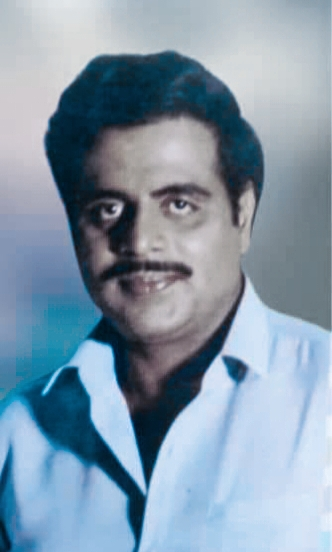

Minister of Housing, Government of Karnataka
- In office 28 May 2013 – 17 September 2016
- Preceded by: V. Somanna
- Succeeded by: M. Krishnappa

Minister of State for Information and Broadcasting
- In office 24 October 2006 – 22 May 2009
- Prime Minister: Manmohan Singh
- Succeeded by: Choudhury Mohan Jatua; S. Jagathrakshakan

Member of parliament, Lok Sabha
- In office 3 March 1998 — 17 May 2009
- Preceded by: Krishna
- Succeeded by: N. Chaluvaraya Swamy
- Constituency: Mandya

Personal details
- Born: Malavalli Huchche Gowda Amarnath; 29 May 1952 Doddarasinakere, Malavalli taluk, Mandya district, Mysore State (Now Karnataka), India
- Died: 24 November 2018 (aged 66) Bangalore, Karnataka, India
- Party: Indian National Congress (1994–1996, 1999–2018)
- Other political affiliations: Janata Dal (1996–1999)
- Spouse: Sumalatha (m. 1991)
- Children: Abhishek (son)
- Profession: Actor; politician

Malavalli Huchchegowda Amarnath (29 May 1952 – 24 November 2018), known by his screen name Ambareesh, was an Indian actor, media personality, and politician from the state of Karnataka. Alongside Rajkumar and Vishnuvardhan, he is considered part of the "triumvirate" of Kannada cinema's most celebrated actors.

With his debut in Puttanna Kanagal's Naagarahaavu (1972), Ambareesh's acting career commenced with a brief phase of portraying antagonistic and supporting characters. After establishing himself as a lead actor portraying rebellious characters on screen in several commercially successful films, he earned the moniker Rebel Star, similar to Krishnam Raju in Telugu cinema. He also earned the nickname Mandyada Gandu (transl. Man of Mandya) and continues to hold a matinee idol status in the popular culture of Karnataka.

After entering politics in 1994, Ambareesh became a three-time member of the Lok Sabha, the lower house of the Indian Parliament representing Mandya, first from Janata Dal and the latter two times from the Indian National Congress, a member of which he remained till his death. During the third term, he briefly served as the Minister of State for Information and Broadcasting, between October 2006 and February 2007, as part of the First Manmohan Singh ministry. Between 2013 and 2016, he was a member of the Karnataka Legislative Assembly and served as the Minister of Housing during the time as part of the Siddaramaiah cabinet.

Besides winning many State Film Awards and Filmfare Awards South during his acting career, Ambareesh was honoured with the honorary doctorate by the Karnatak University in 2013. He is also a recipient of NTR National Award, Filmfare Lifetime Achievement Award – South and Dr. Vishnuvardhan Award, all awarded recognizing lifetime achievements and contribution to cinema. Having suffered from a breathing problem in 2014, Ambareesh died four years later.

== Early life ==
Ambareesh was born as Malavalli Huchchegowda Amarnath, on 29 May 1952 in Doddarasinakere village of Mandya district in the erstwhile Mysore State (now Karnataka). He was the sixth of seven children to Malavalli Huchchegowda and Padmamma. His granduncle was the violinist, Piteel Chowdiah. Ambareesh completed his schooling in Mandya before moving to Mysore for higher studies.

== Career ==
=== As actor ===
Ambareesh appeared as a child artist in the 1955 movie Shivasharane Nambekka alongside Rajendra Singh Babu. While the eminent Kannada film director Puttanna Kanagal was in search of a new face to play a brief antagonist role for his upcoming film, one of Ambareesh's close friends, Sangram Singh, suggested his name for the screen test much against his wishes. At his screen test, he was asked to walk in a certain fashion, utter a dialogue and toss a cigarette in his mouth. Impressed, Kanagal cast him in his 1972 film Naagarahaavu. The film also saw the debut of Vishnuvardhan, another actor who would go on to become one of Kannada cinema's most popular actors.

Ambareesh appeared in about 208 films, including other films of Kanagal such as Paduvaaralli Pandavaru, Shubhamangala, Masanada Hoovu and Ranganayaki (1981). As of 2010, Ambareesh had acted in most films as lead in Kannada films, surpassing Rajkumar's record of 206 films as a lead actor and Vishnuvardhan's record of 230 films (including Kannada, Hindi, Tamil and Malayalam films) as a lead actor. The record has not been broken yet. He also was a supporting actor many times at the beginning of their careers.

Ambareesh played the angry young man of the 1980s, and several films were tailor-made accordingly. The earliest of them was the political satire Antha (1981), directed by Rajendra Singh Babu and remade into Hindi and Tamil. This controversial film was the first in India to depict politicians and government officials as corrupt and villainous. Chakravyuha and New Delhi were made on the same lines, the first remade into Hindi as Inquilaab, starring Amitabh Bachchan and the second a remake of the Malayalam hit of the same name. His other notable films include Ranganayaki, Tony, Rani Maharani, Olavina Udugore, Hrudaya Haadithu, Hongkongnalli Agent Amar, Mannina Doni and Odahuttidavaru. His performance in Masanada Hoovu, Elu Suttina Kote and Sreekumaran Thampi's Malayalam film Gaanam (1982) received critical acclaim. Thampi cast Ambareesh after being impressed with his performance in Ranganayaki. Despite turning out to be a commercial failure, the film went on to win the Kerala State Film Award for Best Film with Popular Appeal and Aesthetic Value.

Ambareesh also showed great performance in Mamateya Madilu, Hrudaya Haadithu, Elu Sutinaa Kote and Mouna Raga. He also acted with legend Rajkumar. He is well known as Mandyada Gandu, Kaliyuga Karna (for his generosity), and Rebel Star. He was awarded the State award for best actor for Antha and best supporting role for Masanada Hoovu, NTR Award by Andhra Pradesh Government, Film Fare best actor award for Olavina Udugore and Film Fare Award (lifetime achievement award). He was the first Kannada actor to inaugurate the world-famous Mysore Dasara festival organized by the government of Karnataka. He also won the Karnataka Government's Dr. Vishnuvardhan Award in 2011.

=== As politician ===
Ambareesh joined the Indian National Congress (INC) ahead of the assembly election in 1994. He campaigned for the party in the election after having been "too late to be given a ticket". However, he was met with a lukewarm reception from the public having been "greeted with slippers and rotten vegetables at a couple of public meetings." He quit the party two years later after being denied a ticket to contest the 1996 general election. Ambareesh subsequently joined the Janata Dal and contested the 1998 general election from Mandya. He won the seat upon polling 431,439 votes against 250,916 for the INC candidate.

In 1999, Ambareesh rejoined the INC and contested in five elections since. He served as minister of state for Information and Broadcasting in the 14th Lok Sabha, but resigned over his dissatisfaction with the Cauvery Dispute Tribunal award, though the resignation was not formally accepted. He was defeated in the May 2009 General Elections. He helped in elections for H.D. Kumaraswamy (in Kanakapura parliament election in the 1990s), S.M. Krishna (1999) and K.R. Pete Krishna.

During the course of his public life, he held the following positions:

- Member, 12th Lok Sabha: 1998–1999
- Member, 13th Lok Sabha: 1999–2004
- Member, 14th Lok Sabha: 2004–2009
- Minister of State, in the Ministry of Information and Broadcasting, from 24 October 2006 to 2008.
- Resigned as the Minister of state in the Ministry of Information and Broadcasting, protesting against the injustice done to Karnataka by Kaveri dispute tribunal in 2008.
- Deputy president of KPCC in the year 2012
- Ex-Minister in Karnataka Government in the ministry of Housing (Vasathi)
- Resigned MP position during Cauvery River issue without fighting member of parliament.

== Personal life ==
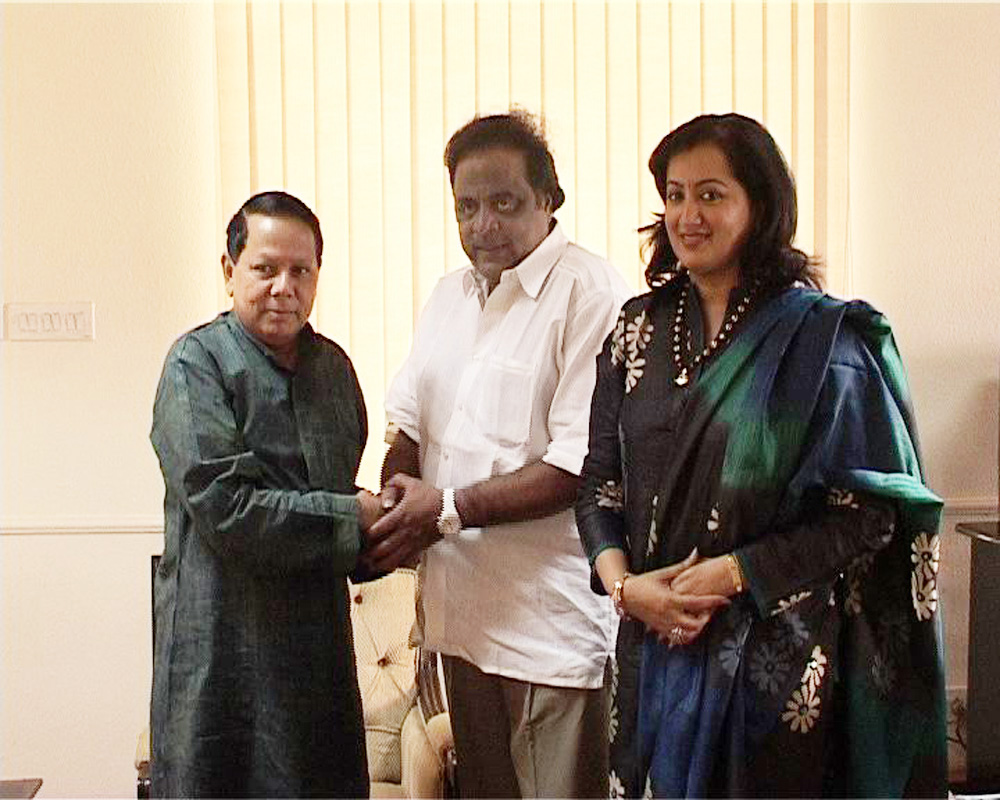
Ambareesh (centre) with the former union minister Priya Ranjan Dasmunsi (left) and his wife Sumalatha (right).

Ambareesh developed a friendship with actress Sumalatha after they first met at the sets of the Kannada film Aahuti in 1984. They grew closer during 1987 when they worked together again with New Delhi. After he proposed marriage to her two years later, they married on 8 December 1991. Their only child, Abhishek, is an actor.

Ambareesh was noted for his friendship, mostly with his contemporaries of the 1980s and across film industries of South India. They included Rajinikanth, Mohan Babu, Mammootty, Mohanlal, Suhasini Maniratnam, Chiranjeevi, Venkatesh Daggubati, R. Sarathkumar, Radhika, Jayaram, Naresh, Arjun Sarja, Ramesh Aravind among others. Calling themselves the "Class of the '80s", Ambareesh hosted their third reunion in 2017. He also maintained a close relationship with Vishnuvardhan ever since they made their debuts together in films with Naagarahaavu in 1972, till the latter's death in 2009.

== Death and reactions ==
Ambareesh developed breathing problems in 2014 and was hospitalized frequently. In March that year, he was taken to Singapore's Mount Elizabeth Hospital for treatment. On 24 November 2018, he was taken to a private hospital in Bangalore after he suffered from a cardiac arrest at his residence. Efforts to revive him failed and was pronounced dead at 10:15 p.m. (IST). Following his death, Ambareesh's remains were taken to Sree Kanteerava Stadium where political leaders, members of the film industry and fans were allowed to pay homage the following day. It attracted a total of around 100,000 people. The remains were airlifted to Sir M. Visvesvaraya Stadium in Mandya at 5 p.m. (IST) that day. After having briefly kept for public viewing there, they were flown back to Bangalore on 26 November and carried in a cortege on a procession from Sree Kanteerava Stadium to Kanteerava Studios, for a distance of 13.5 kilometres (8.4 mi), where his funeral was held. Ambareesh was cremated with full state honours and also received a 21-gun salute. The final rites were performed by his son, Abhishek, at 5:55 p.m. (IST) that evening. Ambareesh was cremated next to the memorial of his contemporary and friend, Rajkumar.

Ambareesh's death was met with an outpouring of grief from politicians, members of the South Indian film industry and fans from Karnataka. The Government of Karnataka declared a three-day mourning period as a mark of respect. Prime Minister Narendra Modi condoled his death and said, "[Ambareesh was] a strong voice for Karnataka's welfare, at the state and central level". Chief Minister of Karnataka H. D. Kumaraswamy termed that his death ended "an era of love and affection in Kannada film industry" while adding that "[Ambareesh] was a rebel who was loved by all. He has carved a unique place in both politics and films". Other politicians who expressed grief included former Chief Ministers of Karnataka, Siddaramaiah and B. S. Yeddyurappa, State cabinet ministers, R. V. Deshpande and U. T. Khader, and former colleagues at the INC, G. Parameshwara, Dinesh Gundu Rao and Ramya among others.

Actor Rajinikanth remarked, "My friendship with Ambareesh is of over 40 years and deeply saddened by his death. Everyone will have a few close friends. But Ambareesh, I think, had over 100 close friends. He lived like a king till the day he died and all he earned were people." Mammootty recalled Ambareesh as "one of [his] first real friends" while condoling his death. Mohanlal termed his death "heartbreaking". Kamal Haasan offered "heartfelt condolences" and called Ambareesh his "friend for 42 years". Other film personalities who expressed grief included Amitabh Bachchan, R. Sarathkumar, Khushbu Sundar, Rajendra Singh Babu, Shiva Rajkumar, Sudeep, Darshan and Yogaraj Bhat among others.

== Awards and recognitions ==
1. Karnataka State Special Award for Best Actor for Antha in 1982.
2. Karnataka State Film Award for Best Supporting Actor (1985–86) for the film Masanada Hoovu.
3. Filmfare Award for Best Actor in the film "Olavina Udugore" directed by Rajendra Babu.
4. Received NTR National Award for the year 2005.
5. Filmfare Lifetime Achievement Award – South 2009.
6. Andhra Government honoured Nandhi Award 2009.
7. Puttanna Kanagal award in 90s but rejected (later went to actor T. N. Balakrishna)
8. TV9 Sandalwood Star Awards – 2012, Lifetime Achievement Award
9. Karnataka Government Dr. Vishnuvardhan Award in the year 2011
10. Honorary Doctorate from the Karnataka University, Dharwad in the year 2013
11. SIIMA Lifetime Achievement Award in 2012
12. Padmabbushan Dr. B. Saroja Devi National Award-2019, awarded posthumously.
