= Adaikalam =

2006 film directed by A.R.Puvanaraaja

- Adaikalam
- Directed by: A.R.Puvanaraajah
- Written by: A.R.Puvanaraajah
- Produced by: N. Sri Narayanathas
- Starring: Prashanth; Uma; Thiagarajan; Saranya Ponvannan Radha Ravi
- Cinematography: T. Anantha Kumar
- Edited by: V. M. Uthayashankar
- Music by: Sabesh–Murali
- Production company: Kaladas Creations
- Release date: 29 December 2006
- Running time: 155 minutes
- Country: India
- Language: Tamil

Adaikalam ( transl. Shelter) is a 2006 Indian Tamil-language drama film directed by A.R.Puvanaraaja and produced by N. Sri Narayanathas for Kaladas Creations. The film stars Prashanth, Uma, Thiagarajan, Radha Ravi and Saranya with a score composed by Sabesh–Murali. The film was released on 29 December 2006.

== Plot ==
Anbu is a doctor and also a lovable brother of Thamizh, who are the son and daughter of Kasthuri. Somasundaram, is Anbu's uncle who takes care of Thamizh and her family. One day Anbu learns about Thamizh's love and arranges for the marriage. During wedding preparations unexpectedly, Kasthuri dies out of shock. Hence Somasundaram calls Anbu's father Sathyamurthy, who was separated from Kasthuri long ago. Anbu is infuriated and argues with Somasundaram not to allow Sathyamurthy to conduct the funeral and rituals. Sathyamurthy is repeatedly snubbed by his children; unperturbed by their mistreatment, he stays quietly with his family, bearing this agony. As story moves on, Sathyamurthy feels sad and shares his story to Somasundaram. Somasundaram narrates the flashback to Anbu and Thamizh and reveals their father's real story.

Sixteen years back, Sathyamurthy and Kasthuri, with their two children, were living happily. When Kasthuri gets pregnant for the third time, Sathyamurthy requests her to abort the baby on doctors' advice. But Kasthuri was adamant to continue bearing the child, so she quarrels with her husband, leaves him abruptly, walks away with her children, and spends the rest of her life with her brother. When she is unconscious, the doctor had aborted the child. After finishing the flashback, Somasundaram says that all their financial needs and wants were fulfilled indirectly by Sathyamurthy from their childhood and for their education also. At last Anbu and Thamizh realise the truth and they accept and reunite with his children.

== Cast ==
- Prashanth as Anbu
- Uma as Thamizh
- Thiagarajan as Sathyamurthy
- Saranya Ponvannan as Kasthuri
- Radharavi as Somasundaram
- Ravichandran as Thamizh's father-in-law
- Nalini as Doctor
- Hemalatha as Amudha
- Periya Karuppu Thevar
- Kottachi

== Production ==
Production for the film began in August 2004 with Prashanth and Uma signed on to play a brother and sister in the film. The film was revealed to be produced by Kaladass Creations, who had earlier produced Balu Mahendra's Veedu (1988), while it would be directed by debutant Bhuvanaraja. Bhuvanaraja had earlier narrated two different scripts to Prashanth and by chance mentioned a partial storyline for a third, with the actor impressed with the final one. Unlike most other Tamil-language films, Adaikalam did not feature a romantic sub-plot for the lead character and Prashanth appreciated that he had accepted to work on the film purely for its strong script and screenplay. Bhuvanaraja cast Prashanth's real life father, Thiagarajan, in a pivotal role while actress Nalini worked on the film free of charge after being impressed with the film's story. The shoot for the film continued throughout regions in Kanyakumari in October 2004.

Once the film was completed, the release was delayed after the producer became caught up with business commitments abroad. The film was further delayed as they did not want to clash with other films with similar themes such as Thavamai Thavamirundhu (2005) and Em Magan (2006). Subsequently, the director went on to start and work on another film titled Brindavanathil Nandakumaran, though it later did not release.

== Soundtrack ==
The soundtrack was composed by the duo Sabesh–Murali.

Song	Singer(s)
"Ada Konda Cheval Olikka"	Sujatha, Madhu Balakrishnan
"Kalyana Sundari Yaro Oru Murai"	Shankar Mahadevan, Anuradha Sriram
"Uyirae Priyathe Uravae Vilakathae"	Hariharan, Sadhana Sargam
"Vaankaiya Vaankikaiya"	Anuradha Sriram, Swarnalatha
"Villakku Ondru Anainthu Ponaal"	Hariharan

== Release and reception ==
The film opened on 29 December 2006. Malathi Rangarajan of The Hindu wrote "'Adaikkalam' is for those who look for a reasonable amount of reality in cinema. Bhuvanaraja has waited long enough for the film to see the light of day. Now that it has, more such breaks ought to follow. The maker deserves it." Malini Mannath of Chennai Online wrote "It's a tale of family bonding, the script a little different and unusual, and narrated with fair competence. The debutant director has tried to give his film a realistic emotional feel throughout".
