= Devan (actor) =

Indian actor and politician (born 1952)

- Born: Devan Sreenivasan; Trichur, Travancore–Cochin, India
- Other name: S. Devan
- Education: St. Thomas College, Trichur
- Occupations: Actor; producer; politician
- Years active: 1983–present
- Political party: TVK (since 2026)
- Other political affiliations: KPP (2004–2020); NKPP (2020–2021); BJP (2021–2026)
- Spouse: Suma
- Children: 1
- Relatives: Ramu Kariat (uncle and father-in-law)

Devan Sreenivasan is an Indian film and television actor and politician. He is known for his character roles, mostly as villain, in Malayalam, Tamil, Telugu and a few Kannada and Hindi films.

He began his film career as a producer with Vellam (1985). Before its release, he turned into an actor. He made his breakthrough in the 1987 film New Delhi. He played lead roles in films like Oru Minnaminunginte Nurunguvettam (1987), Oozham (1988), Simon Peter Ninakku Vendi (1988) and Aranyakam (1988). In his later career, he mostly played prominent supporting roles, mostly as villain. His well-known such films include Vietnam Colony (1992), Ekalavyan (1993), Honest Raj (1994), Baashha (1995) and Indraprasdham (1996).

Devan founded the political party Kerala People's Party in 2004. He relaunched the party as Nava Kerala People's Party in 2020, which was merged with the Bharatiya Janatha Party (BJP) in 2021. In 2023, he was appointed as the state vice-president of BJP in Kerala. In 2026, he resigned from the party. In the same year, he joined Tamilaga Vettri Kazhagam (TVK).

== Early life ==
Devan was born on 8th January 1952 in Thrissur, Kerala. His father, Sreenivasan, was a public prosecutor, and his mother, Lalitha, was a doctor. He has three siblings: Shobha, Sheela, and Sureshbabu. Malayalam filmmaker Ramu Kariat was his uncle.

Devan did his schooling at the Government Model School, Thrissur. He then completed his B.Sc. degree from St. Thomas College, Thrissur. During his college time, he was a member of the Kerala Students Union (KSU), and his parents were Indian National Congress-leaning.

Devan's father wanted him to be a police officer, but he wanted to be in the army. After graduation, he tried at the National Defence Academy but was not selected. He went to Madras (now Chennai) in search of a job and later took post-graduation in Master of Business Administration. He was engaged in several business ventures before starting his career in movies.

== Career ==
=== Acting ===
During his time in college, he used to read books a lot. He found possibility for a film in N. N. Pisharody's novel Vellam, he approached director Hariharan, who agreed with him, M. T. Vasudevan Nair wrote the screenplay, it was the first and last screenplay of his not based on his own story. Devan produced the film, filming was halted midway due to financial crisis. He made his acting debut in Ashatapathi to raise fund to resume filming, it was followed by a number of acting projects. After which, shooting resumed, but upon release, the film failed at the box office. In an interview, he said that Vellam (1985) is the best film come out from Hariharan-M. T. Vasudevan Nair combination. It was in the 1987 film New Delhi that he first appeared as a villain, since then he was typecast as a villain in Malayalam cinema. However, in Telugu cinema, he is known for character roles. Devan recalled in an interview that his best roles were in Telugu and Tamil cinema.

Devan started his acting career in supporting roles, after being approached by a producer at Spencer Plaza in Chennai. His most notable movies are Ekalavyan, Baasha and Indraprasdham. He has also acted in several TV series.

=== Politics ===
Devan was active in Kerala Students Union (KSU) in his college days. In 2004, he founded the Kerala People's Party, a political party in Kerala. He contested and lost in the Wadakkanchery Assembly constituency by-election in the same year as an independent candidate. He contested in the 2006 assembly election from Thiruvananthapuram West as an independent candidate, but lost. In a 2014 interview, Devan revealed his admiration for politician Ramakrishna Hegde. In 2020, he formed a new party named Nava Kerala People's Party. In 2021, it was merged with the Bharatiya Janata Party (BJP) in the presence of Home Minister of India Amit Shah. In 2023, Devan was made the state vice-president of BJP in Kerala. In 2026, he resigned from the party. Then he joined Tamilaga Vettri Kazhagam (TVK).

== Personal life ==
He was married to his uncle Ramu Kariat's daughter, Suma. The couple has a daughter named Lakshmi. His wife Suma died on 12 July 2019 due to H1N1 infection.

== Filmography ==
=== Malayalam ===
==== 1980s ====
| Year | Title | Role | Notes |
|---|---|---|---|
| 1983 | Naadam | | |
| 1983 | Ashtapadi | | |
| 1983 | Sairandri | | |
| 1984 | Aagraham | | |
| 1984 | Aashamsakalode | | |
| 1984 | Vellam | | Producer |
| 1984 | Paavam Krooran | | |
| 1985 | Jwalanam | | |
| 1985 | Shathru | Rajasekharan | |
| 1985 | Kiraatham | Artist | |
| 1985 | Kaiyum Thlayum Purathidaruthe | Mahadevan | |
| 1985 | Madhuvidhu Theerum Mumbe | Sunny | |
| 1986 | Oru Yugasandhya | Balachandran | |
| 1986 | Padayani | SI Rajashekaran | |
| 1986 | Niramulla Ravulkal | Soman | |
| 1986 | Panchagni | Prabhakaran Nair | |
| 1986 | Vartha | Revenue Minister Philip | |
| 1986 | Ithu Oru Thudakkom Mathram | | |
| 1987 | Adimakal Udamakal | Vijayan | |
| 1987 | Aadhya Rathrikku Munbu | | |
| 1987 | Vrutham | Devadas | |
| 1987 | Amrutham Gamaya | Raghu | |
| 1987 | Manivathoorile Aayiram Sivarathrikal | Josephkutty | |
| 1987 | Oru Minnaminunginte Nurunguvettam | Ravi | |
| 1987 | Chanthayil Choodi Nilkkunna Pennu | | |
| 1987 | Naalkavala | Dr. Devadas | |
| 1987 | New Delhi | Shankar | |
| 1988 | Ormayil Ennum | Suku | |
| 1988 | Innaleyude Baakki | Adv. Rajasekharan | |
| 1988 | Mattoru Pranaya Kadha | | |
| 1988 | Simon Peter Ninakku Vendi | Simon Peter | |
| 1988 | Vida Parayaan Mathrem | | |
| 1988 | Mrithyunjayam | Issac | |
| 1988 | Vaisali | | |
| 1988 | Oozham | | |
| 1988 | Athirthikal | | Guest appearance |
| 1988 | Uyaran Omanikkan | | |
| 1988 | Mattoru Pranayakatha | | |
| 1988 | Onninu Purake Mattonnu | Inspector Mohandas | |
| 1988 | Oru Vivaada Vishayam | | |
| 1988 | Aranyakam | Naxal activist | |
| 1988 | David David Mr. David | Mohan | |
| 1988 | Dhinarathrangal | Unni | |
| 1988 | Theerthinariyam Thirayude Vedhana | | |
| 1988 | Abkari | Excise officer Jayaprakash | |
| 1989 | Bhadrachitta | Haridasan | |
| 1989 | Jeevitham Oru Raagam | | |
| 1989 | Adhipan | Mohan | |
| 1989 | Ulsavapittennu | Balan Master | |
| 1989 | Ashokante Aswathikuttikku | | |
| 1989 | Ramji Rao Speaking | Urumees Thampan | |
| 1989 | Nair Saab | Kumar | |
| 1989 | Naduvazhikal | Mathukutty | |
| 1989 | Jagratha | Actor Viswam | |
| 1989 | Unnikrishnante Adyathe Christmas | Jameskutty | |
| 1989 | Oru Vadakkan Veeragatha | Unnikonnar | |
| 1989 | Maharajavu | | |

==== 1990s ====
| Year | Title | Role | Notes |
|---|---|---|---|
| 1990 | Iyer the Great | Gabria | |
| 1990 | Brahmmarakshassu | | |
| 1990 | Marupuram | Francis | |
| 1990 | Judgement | | |
| 1990 | Shesham Screenil | | |
| 1990 | Keli Kottu | | |
| 1990 | Vyooham | Raveendranath | |
| 1990 | Ee Thanutha Veluppan Kalathu | Rosario Fernandez | |
| 1990 | Randaam Varavu | DYSP Balu | |
| 1990 | Malootty | Wilson Cherian | |
| 1991 | Thudar Katha | Prince Ravi Varma | |
| 1991 | Kilukkam | Kannan | |
| 1991 | Anaswaram | Police officer | |
| 1992 | Police Diary | | |
| 1992 | Poochakkaru Mani Kettum | H/o Kunjukutti Amma | |
| 1992 | Grihapravesam | | |
| 1992 | Manthrikacheppu | John Samuel | |
| 1992 | Ponnaramthottathe Rajavu | | |
| 1992 | Kaazhchakkappuram | Harikumar | |
| 1992 | Kauravar | George Mathew MLA | |
| 1993 | O' Faby | John | |
| 1993 | Aalavattam | Dr. Narayankutty | |
| 1993 | Ghoshayaathra | Jamal | |
| 1993 | Gandharvam | Meleveetil Vishnu Menon | |
| 1993 | Vietnam Colony | Adv. Thomas | |
| 1993 | Ekalavyan | Mahesh Nair | |
| 1993 | Yaadhavam | Mohan Thampi | |
| 1993 | Jackpot | Jayan | |
| 1994 | Chief Minister K. R. Gowthami | K.V Chakko | |
| 1994 | Ezhuthachan | | |
| 1994 | Rudraksham | Patel | |
| 1994 | Pingami | Vijay's father | |
| 1994 | Cabinet | | |
| 1995 | The King | | |
| 1995 | Sundarimaare Sookshikkuka | Raju | |
| 1995 | Hijack | Swami/Ravindra Varma | |
| 1995 | Chantha | Alexander | |
| 1995 | Agnidevan | Rama "Appan" Varma | |
| 1995 | Nirnayam | Dr. Menon | |
| 1996 | Mahathma | James Kutty | |
| 1996 | Indraprastham | Paul B. Issac | |
| 1996 | Dominic Presentation | | |
| 1996 | Sulthan Hyderali | | |
| 1996 | Aayiram Naavulla Ananthan | Idikkula Abraham | |
| 1997 | Janathipathyam | Vishakom Thirunal Prathapa Varma | |
| 1997 | Poomarathanalil | Narendran | |
| 1997 | Ranger | Professor Devan | |
| 1997 | Gangothri | DCP Alexander IPS | |
| 1997 | Bhoopathi | Lawrence | |
| 1997 | Masmaram | Munna Bhaai | |
| 1997 | Kannur | | |
| 1997 | Snehasindooram | Rajeevan | |
| 1997 | Sankeerthanam Pole | | |
| 1997 | Five Star Hospital | Varma | |
| 1998 | Harthaal | Dharam Pal Yadav / Vincent Cavelli | |
| 1998 | Sooryaputhran | Deva Varma | |
| 1998 | Chitrashalabham | Dr. Raveendranath | |
| 1998 | Achaammakkuttiyude Achaayan | Dr. John Zecharia | |
| 1998 | Ayal Kadha Ezhuthukayanu | Mohanan | |
| 1999 | Pallavur Devanarayanan | Brahmadattan | |
| 1999 | Captain | John Samuel | |
| 1999 | Jananayakan | Sathyapalan | |
| 1999 | Niram | Er. Jacob / Job | |
| 1999 | Garshom | Hakkim | |
| 1999 | Red Indians | CI Harisankar | |
| 1999 | F. I. R. | Brigadier Giridhar Baruva | |

==== 2000s ====
| Year | Title | Role | Notes |
|---|---|---|---|
| 2000 | Arayannangalude Veedu | Rajendranath Menon | |
| 2000 | Millennium Stars | | |
| 2000 | Indriyam | Rajaraja Varma Thirumanas | |
| 2000 | Nisheedhini | Madhu | |
| 2000 | Rapid Action Force | | |
| 2000 | The Judgement | | |
| 2000 | Sradha | Dr. Balachandran | |
| 2000 | The Warrant | Mohan Gandhi Raman | |
| 2000 | Priyam | Joshua | |
| 2000 | Summer Palace | Raveendran | |
| 2001 | Akashathile Paravakal | Karunan | |
| 2001 | Onnam Raagam | | |
| 2001 | Nee Enikkayi Mathrem | | |
| 2001 | Ee Raavil | | |
| 2001 | Praja | DGP | Guest Appearance |
| 2001 | Sraavu | Captain Napoleon | |
| 2001 | Sathyameva Jayathe | DCP Mathew Tharakan IPS | |
| 2001 | Sahayathrikakku Snehapoorvam | | |
| 2001 | Goa | Sam Alex | |
| 2001 | Achaneyanenikkishtam | Andrews Issac | |
| 2001 | Jwalanam | | |
| 2002 | Khakhi Nakshatram | George | |
| 2002 | Kalachakram | | |
| 2002 | Kanmashi | Chandramohan | |
| 2002 | Puthooramputhri Unniyarcha | Chandu Chekavar | |
| 2002 | Vaanibham | | |
| 2002 | Niramulla Swapnagal | | |
| 2002 | Desam | Unni | |
| 2002 | Akhila | Balan | |
| 2002 | India Gate | Vishwanadhan | |
| 2003 | Mr. Brahmachari | | |
| 2004 | Priyam Priyankaram | | |
| 2004 | Nirappakittu | | |
| 2004 | Ennittum | Chandu | |
| 2004 | Udayam | | |
| 2005 | December | Issac | |
| 2005 | Finger Print | Adv. Murali Mohan | |
| 2005 | Bunglavil Outha | | |
| 2005 | Bus Conductor | | |
| 2006 | Pathaaka | Rajan Nadar | |
| 2006 | Highway Police | DSP Somanathan | |
| 2006 | Red Salute | Kolappalli Govindan | |
| 2006 | Narakasuran | Badri | |
| 2006 | Bada Dosth | Minister K.D | |
| 2006 | Balram vs. Tharadas | DGP Madhavadas IPS | |
| 2006 | Vargam | Ummen Chacko | |
| 2006 | Thuruppugulan | Chandrasekhara Menon | |
| 2007 | Paranju Theeratha Visheshangal | Ashok | |
| 2007 | Detective | DGP | |
| 2007 | Mauryan | | |
| 2007 | Athisayan | Kuwait Nazar | |
| 2007 | Nasrani | Thampan Joseph | |
| 2007 | July 4 | Viswanathan | |
| 2008 | Bullet | Yamuna Prasad | |
| 2008 | Parunthu | Mahesh | |
| 2008 | Novel | | |
| 2008 | Cycle | | |
| 2009 | My Big Father | Colonel Varghese | |
| 2009 | I. G. – Inspector General | DGP Varghese Philip IPS | |
| 2009 | Gulumaal: The Escape | Emir Harish Rahman | |
| 2009 | Ivar Vivahitharayal | Treesa's father | |
| 2009 | The Trigger | | |
| 2009 | Pathaam Adyaayam | | |
| 2009 | Banaras | Balakrishnan Nair | |
| 2009 | Nizhal | | |
| 2009 | Pazhassi Raja | Kannavathu Nambiar | |
| 2009 | Black Dalia | Raveendren | |

==== 2010s ====
| Year | Title | Role | Notes |
|---|---|---|---|
| 2010 | Yugapurushan | Madhavan | |
| 2010 | Koottukar | Krishnan Nair | |
| 2010 | Nizhal | | |
| 2010 | 24 Hrs | Vikramaditya Varma | |
| 2010 | Kaanakazchakal | | |
| 2010 | Nanthuni | | |
| 2010 | Naale | | |
| 2010 | Arayan | | |
| 2010 | Drona 2010 | DIG Beeran Sahib IPS | |
| 2011 | Avan | | |
| 2011 | Manushyamrugam | Olikkal Kochupaulose | |
| 2011 | The Filmstaar | Minister Thamban | |
| 2011 | Manikyakkallu | Ramachandran Master | |
| 2011 | Christian Brothers | Home Minister Sudhakaran | |
| 2011 | Mohabbath | Kabeer | |
| 2011 | Ithu Nammude Katha | Vijayarakhavan | |
| 2011 | Janapriyan | Meera's father | |
| 2011 | Veeraputhran | Adv. Krishnan | |
| 2012 | Yaathrakkoduvil | David | |
| 2012 | Aakasmikam | | |
| 2012 | Doctor Innocent Aanu | Dr. James | |
| 2012 | Namukku Parkkan | Varghese | |
| 2012 | Yakshi – Faithfully Yours | Appan Thampuran | |
| 2012 | Grand Master | ADGP Vijayan IPS | |
| 2012 | The King & the Commissioner | IG Shankar Ramadas IPS | |
| 2012 | Manthrikan | Shenoy | |
| 2012 | Simhasanam | Bhargavanunni | |
| 2013 | Weeping Boy | Jail Superintendent | |
| 2013 | Immanuel | Kuwait Kumaran | Cameo |
| 2013 | Aan Piranna Veedu | | |
| 2013 | Red Rain | | |
| 2013 | Pakaram | | |
| 2013 | Manikya Thampurattiyum Christmas Carolum | | |
| 2013 | Blackberry | Minister Ramachandran | |
| 2013 | Breaking News Live | | |
| 2013 | 3 G | | |
| 2013 | Last Bus 8:30 PM | | |
| 2014 | Law Point | Mohan | |
| 2014 | Mannar Mathai Speaking 2 | | |
| 2014 | How Old Are You? | Setharaman Iyer | |
| 2014 | Mammiyude Swantham Achoos | | |
| 2014 | Vasanthathinte Kanal Vazhikalil | | |
| 2014 | Dial 1091 | | |
| 2014 | Gamer | | |
| 2014 | Uthara Chemmeen | Kunjaayi | |
| 2014 | Solar Swapnam | | |
| 2014 | Avatharam | Dr. Mathew Philip | |
| 2014 | Asha Black | Srinivas | |
| 2014 | Ettekaal Second | | |
| 2014 | Mr. Fraud | Sri Krishna Varma | |
| 2015 | Wonderful Journey | | |
| 2015 | Raag Rangeela | | |
| 2015 | Female Unnikrishnan | Madhavan Nair | |
| 2015 | Namasthe Bali | Anto Chakkalakyal | |
| 2015 | Samrajyam II: Son of Alexander | Surya Das | |
| 2015 | Rudra Simhasanam | Neelakanda Raja | |
| 2015 | Oru New Generation Pani | | |
| 2015 | Rasam | Shekhar Menon | |
| 2015 | Calling Bell | | |
| 2015 | Plus Or Minus | | |
| 2015 | Just Married | | |
| 2015 | Marutha | | |
| 2015 | Village Guys | | |
| 2016 | Marupadi | | |
| 2016 | Daffedar | | |
| 2016 | Angane Thanne Nethave Anjettanam Pinnale | | |
| 2016 | Pretham | Principal of National Law College | |
| 2016 | Ore Mukham | Older Aravindan | |
| 2017 | 1971: Beyond Borders | IB Director Nair IPS | |
| 2017 | Vishwa Vikhyatharaya Payyanmar | Fa.Baby John | |
| 2017 | Hello Dubaikkaran | | |
| 2017 | Pranayatheertham | | |
| 2018 | Marubhoomiyile Mazhathullikal | | |
| 2018 | Ippozhum Eppozhum Sthuthiyayirikkatte | | |
| 2018 | Koodasha | | |
| 2018 | Aravindante Athidhikal | Geethalakshmi's husband | |
| 2018 | Koode | Ouseppachan | |
| 2019 | Vijay Superum Pournamiyum | Kanaran | |
| 2019 | Pattabhiraman | Rajasekhara Varma | |
| 2019 | Ganagandharvan | Sivadasan | |
| 2019 | 1948 Kaalam Paranjathu | | |
| 2019 | Mangalath Vasundhara | | |
| 2019 | Jack & Daniel | GK Nair | |
| 2019 | A for Apple | Ahmed Haji | |
| 2019 | Oru Caribbean Udayippu | | |
| 2019 | Munthiri Monchan | Madhavan Kutty | |

==== 2020s ====
| Year | Title | Role | Notes |
|---|---|---|---|
| 2020 | Love FM | | |
| 2020 | Big Brother | ADGP Prathapachandra Menon | |
| 2021 | Kshanam | Vincent | |
| 2022 | Kalachekon | | |
| 2022 | Mahi | | |
| 2024 | Bad Boyz | Antappan's father | |
| 2025 | Bha Bha Ba | Commissioner Dev G. | |
| 2026 | Law and Order | Yousif Ali Khan | |

=== Tamil ===
| Year | Title | Role | Notes |
|---|---|---|---|
| 1993 | Prathap | Michael Raj | |
| 1994 | Honest Raj | Varadharajan | |
| 1994 | Jai Hind | Sriram | |
| 1995 | Baashha | Kesavan | |
| 1995 | Nandhavana Theru | Adhiseshan | |
| 1995 | Ragasiya Police | ACP Dinesh | |
| 1997 | Mannava | Suriya | |
| 1997 | Ullaasam | Chatterjee | |
| 1997 | Thadayam | Pandian | |
| 1997 | Veerapandi Kottayiley | | |
| 1997 | My India | | |
| 1998 | Iniyavale | Meena and Manju's uncle | |
| 1999 | En Swasa Kaatre | ACP | |
| 1999 | Siragugal | Viswa | Sun TV telefilm |
| 1999 | Rajasthan | | |
| 1999 | Periyanna | Varadharajan | |
| 1999 | Nenjinile | Samraj | |
| 1999 | Manam Virumbuthe Unnai | Ramesh | |
| 1999 | Time | Seetharaman | |
| 2000 | Vaanathaippola | Dharmalingam | |
| 2000 | Ennamma Kannu | | |
| 2000 | Vaanavil | Major Saravanan | |
| 2001 | Rishi | Minister Devaraj | |
| 2001 | Citizen | DGP Devasagayam IPS | |
| 2001 | Shahjahan | Mahee's father | |
| 2002 | Punnagai Desam | Rajarathinam | |
| 2002 | Roja Kootam | | |
| 2002 | Raja | Priya's father | |
| 2002 | Maaran | Central Minister | |
| 2002 | April Maadhathil | Shwetha's father | |
| 2003 | Aahaa Ethanai Azhagu | Ashok | |
| 2003 | Thithikudhe | Anu's father | |
| 2003 | Indru | Ramprasad | |
| 2004 | Campus | R. K. Devaraj | |
| 2004 | Jai | Nandhini's uncle | |
| 2004 | Adi Thadi | | |
| 2004 | Perazhagan | DSP Nair | |
| 2004 | Shock | Dr. Shyam | |
| 2004 | Arivumani | Mariyanayagam | |
| 2004 | Arasatchi | Karunakaran | |
| 2004 | Bose | Col. Sharma | |
| 2004 | Gomathi Nayagam | | |
| 2005 | Sivakasi | Rathnavelu | |
| 2006 | Aathi | Shankar | |
| 2006 | Aacharya | | |
| 2006 | Vanjagan | Arunachalam | |
| 2006 | Vathiyar | Factory Owner | |
| 2006 | Manasukkule | | |
| 2008 | Satyam | Police Inspector | |
| 2008 | Aegan | Ram Prasad | |
| 2010 | Thairiyam | | |
| 2010 | Vinnaithaandi Varuvaayaa | Joseph | |
| 2011 | Kanchana | MLA Shankar | |
| 2011 | Konjam Sirippu Konjam Kobam | | |
| 2012 | Murattu Kaalai | | |
| 2013 | Chennaiyil Oru Naal | Dr. Senthil | |
| 2013 | Masani | Swami | |
| 2014 | Nee Naan Nizhal | | |
| 2014 | Appavi Katteri | | |
| 2016 | Ennam Pudhu Vannam | | |
| 2018 | Imaikkaa Nodigal | CBI Officer Narayan Gowda | |

=== Telugu ===
| Year | Title | Role | Notes |
|---|---|---|---|
| 1992 | Dharma Kshetram | Pandu | |
| 1993 | Aasayam | Reddappa | |
| 1993 | Rowdy Mogudu | Sarvarayudu | |
| 1993 | Ratha Sarathi | | |
| 1994 | Police Brothers | | |
| 1994 | Captain | Jaya | |
| 1995 | Street Fighter | Sagar | |
| 1996 | Sampradayam | Bhupathi Raja | |
| 1996 | Akka! Bagunnava? | | |
| 1997 | Subhakankshalu | Balaramaiah | |
| 1997 | Pelli Chesukundam | Krishna Prasad | |
| 2000 | Maa Annayya | | |
| 2002 | Mounamelanoyi | Mounika's father | |
| 2003 | Okariki Okaru | Swapna Rao's father | |
| 2004 | Sivaram | | |
| 2004 | Chennakesava Reddy | Judge Ravi Reddy | |
| 2004 | Anandamanandamaye | Bhuvana's father | |
| 2004 | Kaasi | GK | |
| 2004 | Kushi Kushiga | | |
| 2007 | Desamuduru | Narayan Patwari | |
| 2010 | Vareva | | |
| 2010 | Ye Maaya Chesave | Joseph | |
| 2012 | Dhamarukam | Vishwanath | |
| 2012 | Sarocharu | Vasudha's father | |
| 2014 | Heart Attack | Madhusudhan | |
| 2015 | Soukhyam | Shailu's father | |
| 2017 | Raju Gari Gadhi 2 | Vice Chancellor Chandra Shekar | |
| 2019 | Saaho | IG Devan Varma | |

=== Kannada ===
| Year | Title | Role | Notes |
|---|---|---|---|
| 1995 | Deergha Sumangali | | |
| 1997 | Rough and Tough | | |

=== Hindi ===
| Year | Title | Role | Notes |
|---|---|---|---|
| 1988 | New Delhi | Shankar | |
| 2019 | Saaho | IG Devan Varma | |

=== Television ===
- All TV series are in Malayalam language unless otherwise noted.

| Year | Title | Channel | Role | Notes |
|---|---|---|---|---|
| 1995 | Chinna Chinna Aasai - Uravu | Sun TV | Suresh | Tamil series; Television debut |
| 2001 | Porutham | Sun Surya | | Won, Social Organisation for Media and Arts (SOMA)-Best Actor |
| 2002 | Sarada | Asianet | | |
| 2004 | Orma | Asianet | Nandan Menon | |
| 2005 | Kudumbini | Asianet | Nandakumar | |
| 2005-2006 | Krishnakripasagaram | Amrita TV | Kamsa | |
| 2006 | Lakshyam | Asianet | | |
| 2006 | Kaliveedu | Sun Surya | | |
| 2006-2008 | Swamy Ayyappan | Asianet | Raja Rajasekhara Pandiyan/Pandhalam Rajavu | Won, Asianet Television Award 2008-Best Supporting Actor |
| 2006-2008 | Kalyani | Sun Surya | | |
| 2007 | Manasariyathe | Sun Surya | | |
| 2006 | Daya | Kairali TV | Major | |
| 2007 | Mounam Nombaram | Kairali TV | | |
| 2008 | Srikrishnaleela | Asianet | Vilwamangalam Swamiyar | |
| 2008-2009 | Kalasam | Sun TV | | Tamil series |
| 2009 | Dream City | Sun Surya | Mulkattil group CEO Menon | |
| 2009 | Swamy ayyappan Sharanam | Asianet | Raja Rajasekhara Pandiyan/Pandhalam Rajavu | |
| 2009-2010 | Autograph | Asianet | Principal P.Sethuramayyer | |
| 2010 | Ponnum poovum | Amrita TV | Devan | |
| 2010 | Indhraneelam | Sun Surya | | |
| 2010-2011 | Veera Marthanda Varma | Sun Surya | Thiruvithamkoor Rajavu | |
| 2012 | Ramayanam | Mazhavil Manorama | Dasharatha | |
| 2013 | Sri Padmanabham | Amrita TV | Thiruvithamkoor Rajavu | |
| 2021–Present | Kanyadanam | Sun Surya | Ananthan | Come back to television |

== See also ==
- Kerala Peoples Party
