= Salem Vishnu =

- Poster
- Directed by: Thiagarajan
- Written by: Thiagarajan
- Produced by: Thiagarajan
- Starring: Thiagarajan; Rupini
- Cinematography: Gopinath
- Edited by: Siva Subramaniam
- Music by: Sangeetha Rajan
- Production company: Lakshmi Shanthi Movies
- Release date: 16 February 1990
- Running time: 130 minutes
- Country: India
- Language: Tamil

Salem Vishnu (/seɪləm/) is a 1990 Indian Tamil-language action film written, produced and directed by Thiagarajan. The film stars Thiagarajan and Rupini. It is a spinoff/prequel of the Malayalam film New Delhi (1987), with Thiagarajan reprising his role from that film. The film was released on 16 February 1990.

== Plot ==
Vishnu is a clever student, but he cannot tolerate cheating at the school exam, and beats up the professor; he was subsequently expelled. He decides to work as a car mechanic. Vishnu and Shanthi fell in love with each other.

Vishnu's brother Siva is an honest municipal commissioner. Siva and his wife Lakshmi, a jailer, are transferred to the same city where Vishnu lives. They are shocked when Vishnu tells that he works as a car mechanic.

Kathavarayan, the municipal chairman, and his brother Ashokan are corrupt, influential persons. Siva clashes with them. Meantime, Ashokan kills journalist Raji, who sends the details of their illegal works to Siva. Ashokan is later sent to jail. Siva wants also to punish Kathavarayan, but Ashokan kills him. The guiltless Vishnu is sent to jail for killing his own brother. In jail, he meets his sister-in-law Lakshmi and his enemy Ashokan. What transpires later forms the crux of the story.

== Cast ==
- Thiagarajan as Salem Vishnu
- Rupini as Shanthi
- R. Sarathkumar as Siva
- Geetha as Lakshmi
- Ratheesh as Ashokan
- Goundamani as Kathavarayan
- Meesai Murugesan as Vishnu's father
- S. N. Lakshmi as Vishnu's mother
- Vinu Chakravarthy as Jailor Sundaram
- Vennira Aadai Moorthy as Muthu
- V. K. Ramasamy as Pachai
- Vaishnavi as Raji
- Jayamalini as Jaya
- M. S. Bhaskar as Professor
- Omakuchi Narasimhan as Zamindar
- Oru Viral Krishna Rao as Lawyer
- K. R. Savithri
- C. Pravin Kumar as Police officer
- Pasi Narayanan as Mechanic
- Kullamani as Mechanic
- Vellai Subbaiah as Mechanic
- Karuppu Subbiah as Mechanic

== Soundtrack ==
The soundtrack was composed by Sangeetha Rajan.

Song	Singer(s)	Lyrics	Duration
"Hey Nanaa Vayasu Pulla"	K. S. Chithra	Vairamuthu	4:23
"Kai Thottu Parkkanum"	S. P. Balasubrahmanyam, S. Janaki	Vaali	4:13
"Mayankinen Mannan Ingu"	S. P. Balasubrahmanyam	Thiagarajan	3:43
"Valayal Satham"	S. P. Balasubrahmanyam, S. Janaki	Vaali	4:12
"Varuvathu Varattum"	Sangeetha Rajan	Kennedy	4:55

== Reception ==
P. S. S. of Kalki praised the performances of Geetha, Goundamani and Vinu Chakravarthy, outdoor locations and camera angles but panned the obscene dance movements and humour track and concluded saying let it be a film made entirely for commercial purposes and questioned the relying on formal legal schemes to check irregularities, which the reviewer deemed useless.
