= Vazhkai / Jeevitham =

Vazhkai / Jeevitham may refer to:

- Vazhkai, 1949 Tamil film produced and directed by A. V. Meiyappan and starred by Vyjayanthimala in her screen debut
- Jeevitham (1950 film), 1950 Telugu film produced and directed by A. V. Meiyappan and starred by Vyjayanthimala in her Telugu cinema debut
- Bahar (film), 1951 Hindi film produced by A. V. Meiyappan and directed by M. V. Raman while starred by Vyjayanthimala in her Hindi cinema debut
