= M. S. Rajeswari =

Indian playback singer (1932–2018)

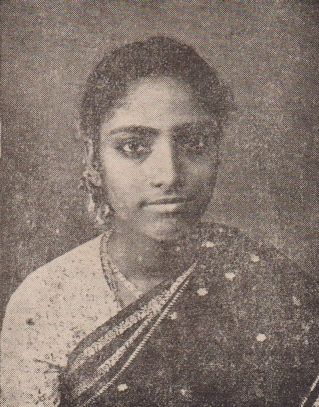
- M. S. Rajeswari in late 1940s

Background information
- Born: Madurai Satagopan Rajeswari; 24 February 1932
- Origin: Madras Presidency, British India
- Died: 25 April 2018 (aged 86)
- Genres: Film music (playback singing), Indian classical music, Tamil patriotic
- Occupation: Singer
- Years active: 1946–2018

M. S. Rajeswari (Tamil: எம். எஸ். ராஜேஸ்வரி; 24 February 1932 – 25 April 2018) was an Indian playback singer who has recorded over 500 songs in Tamil, Telugu, Malayalam and Kannada language films.

== Early life ==
She was born on 24 February 1932 to Madurai Satagopan and T. V. Rajasundari who herself was a singer and stage artist. Rajeswari was introduced to film singing by family friend B. R. Panthulu.

== Career life ==
She started her career in AVM Studios where she was one of the resident playback singers along with T. S. Bagavathi. Her very first song was Maiyal Migavum Meerudhe in the film Vijayalakshmi produced by Pragathi Pictures, the forerunner to AVM Studios. During the 1940s, she sang for almost all the films produced by AVM before continuing her work independently. In later years, she was a popular voice for child artists.

She rendered songs which consist of solos and duets in all of the AVM Studios early productions such as Nam Iruvar, Rama Rajyam, Vedhala Ulagam, Vazhkai, Jeevitham, Or Iravu, Parasakthi, Gunasagari, Penn and Chella Pillai.

She sang more often in the 1940s and 1950s compared to her work during the 1960s to 1990s. During the later half, she was only sought in songs that voice needed for small children. Films such as Kaveriyin Kanavan, Kaithi Kannayiram and Engal Selvi are the earlier ones where she recorded her voice for child artists. Since 1964 till the 1990s she was only sought for playback for child artists.

She was the first playback singer for Kamal Haasan for the song Ammaavum Neeye Appaavum Neeye in Kalathur Kannamma when she was offered by AVM Studios after a break.

Rajeswari had recorded many songs for Baby Shamili. Her voice suits the best when Shamili was a child artist in Dhurga, Lakshmi Dhurga, Bhairavi, Sendhoora Devi, Sindhoora Devi, Thai Poosam, Sivasangkari, Dheiva Kuzhandhai and Sivarathiri.

=== Music composers she sang for ===
She started her career in AVM Studios under R. Sudarsanam’s music. Later, many of her songs are under K. V. Mahadevan's music direction. In the late 1980s and early 1990s, Shankar–Ganesh engaged her often.

- G. Govindarajulu Naidu
- R. Sudarsanam
- Naushad
- R. Govardhanam
- S. V. Venkatraman
- C. Ramchandra
- M. S. Gnanamani
- Poornanandha
- Robin Chatterjee
- G. Ramanathan
- K. V. Mahadevan
- S. V. Venkatraman
- M. Ranga Rao
- Viswanathan–Ramamoorthy
- Tiruvenkadu Selvarathinam
- Vedha
- G. Devarajan
- M. S. Viswanathan
- Pukazhenthi
- Master Venu
- B. A. Chidambaranath
- Shankar–Ganesh
- T. K. Ramamoorthy
- Shyam
- Ilaiyaraaja
- Chandrabose

=== Playback singers she sang with ===
She sang memorable duets mostly with T. M. Soundararajan. Others include Seerkazhi Govindarajan, A. M. Rajah, Thiruchi Loganathan, V. J. Varma, K. Devanarayanan, V. N. Sundaram, A. L. Raghavan, S. C. Krishnan, M. Satyanarayana, Madhavapeddi Satyam, Ghantasala, K. Appa Rao, K. J. Yesudas, S. P. Balasubrahmanyam & Mano.

She also sang duets with female singers, most notably with T. S. Bagavathi. Others are L. R. Eswari, K. Jamuna Rani, P. Susheela, Radha Jayalakshmi, R. Balasaraswathi Devi, A. P. Komala, S. Janaki, K. S. Chithra, Swarnalatha, U. R. Chandra, L. R. Anjali, N. L. Ganasaraswathi, K. Rani, Santha P. Nair & Kalyani.

The singing actors she sang with were K. R. Ramasamy & T. R. Ramachandran.

== Death ==
She died on 25 April 2018 at the age of 87 due to age-related ailments.

== Filmography ==
Year	Film	Language	Song	Lyrics	Music director	Co-singer
1946	Vijayalakshmi	Tamil	Maiyal Migavum Meerudhe		G. Govindarajulu Naidu	
1947	Nam Iruvar	Tamil	Mahaan Gaandhiye Mahaane	K. P. Kamatchi Sundaram	R. Sudarsanam	
1947	Nam Iruvar	Tamil	Karunamoorthi Gaandhi Mahaathmaa	K. P. Kamatchi Sundaram	R. Sudarsanam	
1947	Rama Rajyam	Tamil	Oonjal Oonjal		R. Sudarsanam	
1947	Rama Rajyam	Tamil	Oh Raani Mahaaraani		R. Sudarsanam	T. S. Bagavathi
1947	Rama Rajyam	Tamil	Yaavarum Sundharamaaga		R. Sudarsanam	
1948	Vedhala Ulagam	Tamil	Odi Vilaiyaadu Paappaa	Mahakavi Subramaniya Bharathiyar	R. Sudarsanam	T. S. Bagavathi
1948	Vedhala Ulagam	Tamil	Vaasam Ulla Poo Parippene		R. Sudarsanam	T. S. Bagavathi
1948	Vedhala Ulagam	Tamil	Aadum Mayil Paadum Kuyil		R. Sudarsanam	
1948	Vedhala Ulagam	Tamil	Iravile Vandhaan Inba Sugam Thandhu		R. Sudarsanam	
1948	Vedhala Ulagam	Tamil	Anandham Aanen Naan Aahaa		R. Sudarsanam	
1949	Vazhkai	Tamil	Enni Enni Paarkka Manam Inbam	K. P. Kamatchi Sundharam	R. Sudarsanam	
1949	Vazhkai	Tamil	Senthamizhum Suvaiyum Polave	K. P. Kamatchi Sundharam	R. Sudarsanam	T. R. Ramachandran
1949	Vazhkai	Tamil	Manamevum Aasai.... Un Kangal Unnai Emaatrinaal	K. P. Kamatchi Sundharam	R. Sudarsanam	
1949	Vazhkai	Tamil	Aasai Kollum Meesaiyulla	K. P. Kamatchi Sundharam	R. Sudarsanam	A. G. Rathnamala
1949	Vazhkai	Tamil	Uzhuthundu Vaazhvaar.... Paadupattaale Palan Koodum	K. P. Kamatchi Sundharam	R. Sudarsanam	T. S. Bagavathi
1949	Vazhkai	Tamil	Senthamizhum Suvaiyum Polave (Short)	K. P. Kamatchi Sundharam	R. Sudarsanam	T. R. Ramachandran & T. S. Bagavathi
1950	Jeevitham	Telugu	Tikku Tikku Takkuladi	Toleti Venkata Reddy	R. Sudarsanam	
1950	Jeevitham	Telugu	Mana Manasu Manasu Ekamai	Tholeti Venkata Reddy	R. Sudarsanam	M. Satyanarayana
1950	Jeevitham	Telugu	Priyamaina Rajaa.... Nee Kan Ninne Praminchinaa	Toleti Venkata Reddy	R. Sudarsanam	
1950	Jeevitham	Telugu	Chakkanaina Boya Rajuni	Tholeti Venkata Reddy	R. Sudarsanam	A. G. Rathnamala
1950	Jeevitham	Telugu	Bhoomi Dunnaloy Mana Desam	Toleti Venkata Reddy	R. Sudarsanam	T. S. Bagavathi
1950	Jeevitham	Telugu	Nandha Gopala Neetho Ne Aadudhaanoy	Toleti Venkata Reddy	R. Sudarsanam	
1951	Or Iravu	Tamil	Thunbam Nergaiyil Yaazhedutthu	Bharathidasan	R. Sudarsanam	V. J. Varma
1951	Or Iravu	Tamil	Vasandha Mullaiyum Malligaiyum	K. P. Kamatchi Sundharam	R. Sudarsanam	
1951	Or Iravu	Tamil	Kottu Murase Kottu Murase	Mahakavi Subramaniya Bharathiyar	R. Sudarsanam	K. R. Ramasamy & V. J. Varma
1951	Or Iravu	Tamil	Vaazhiya Sendhamizh	Mahakavi Subramaniya Bharathiyar	R. Sudarsanam	K. Devanarayanan
1951	Or Iravu	Tamil	Padutthurangum Podhu.... Akkam Pakkam Yaarum Illai	K. P. Kamatchi Sundharam	R. Sudarsanam	dialogues by A. Nageswara Rao
1951	Or Iravu	Tamil	Arumbu Pol Meesai.... Paartthu Paartthu Kanngal Rendum	K. P. Kamatchi Sundharam	R. Sudarsanam	V. J. Varma & T. S. Bagavathi
1952	Murattu Adiyaal	Tamil	Aahaahaa.... Indru Endhan Nenjil Saki		Naushad	
1952	Murattu Adiyaal	Tamil	Izhandhen Unai Anbe		Naushad	
1952	Parasakthi	Tamil	O Rasikkum Seemaane	K. P. Kamatchi Sundaram	R. Sudarsanam	
1952	Parasakthi	Tamil	Pudhu Pennin Manadhai Thottu Ponavare	K. P. Kamatchi Sundaram	R. Sudarsanam	
1952	Parasakthi	Tamil	Ellorum Vaazha Vendum	Annal Thango	R. Sudarsanam	T. S. Baghavathi
1952	Velaikaran	Tamil	Idhaya Veenaiyin Narambai Meettiya	K. P. Kamatchi Sundaram	R. Sudarsanam	
1952	Velaikaran	Tamil	Aanandame Aahaa Aanandame	Ku. Ma. Balasubramaniam	R. Sudarsanam	
1952	Velaikaran	Tamil	Maane Marikozhundhe	Ku. Ma. Balasubramaniam	R. Sudarsanam	T. S. Bhagavathi, A. G. Rathnamala & Soolamangalam Rajalakshmi
1953	Gunasagari	Kannada	Daari Thoro Prabo Shankara		R. Sudarsanam	
1953	Jatagam	Tamil	Kuzhavum Yaazhilsaiye Kannan	T. K. Sundara Vathiyar	R. Govardhanam	
1953	Jatagam	Tamil	Maadugal Meitthidum Paiyan	T. K. Sundara Vathiyar	R. Govardhanam	
1953	Jatagam	Tamil	Manadhil Pudhuvidha Inbam Kaanudhe	T. K. Sundara Vathiyar	R. Govardhanam	
1953	Jatagam	Tamil	Eliyor Seiyum Izhivaana Thozhilai	T. K. Sundara Vathiyar	R. Govardhanam	P. Susheela
1953	Jathaka Phala	Kannada	Lalane		R. Govardhanam	P. Susheela
1953	Manithan	Tamil	Penne Ulagin Kanne	Kanagasurabhi	S. V. Venkatraman	
1953	Nalla Pillai	Tamil	Joraaka Paadi Anbaaga Aadi		C. Ramchandra	T. M. Soundararajan
1953	Nalla Pillai	Tamil	Thozhi Un Kann Edhire Kodi		C. Ramchandra	T. M. Soundararajan
1953	Prapancham	Telugu	Naa Premaraani Jeevanavaaṇi	Sri Sri	M. S. Gnanamani & Poornanandha	A. M. Rajah
1953	Ratna Deepam	Tamil	Kaanamenum Thanam Kandaen	Vijayakumar	Robin Chatterjee	
1953	Ratna Deepam	Tamil	Kaadhal Endraale Mana Thunbam	Vijayakumar	Robin Chatterjee	
1953	Sathya Sodhanai	Tamil	Kaadhal Vaanil Nee Chandrodhayam	V. Seetharaman	R. Sudarsanam	
1953	Sathya Sodhanai	Tamil	Odi Vaa Odi Vaa Velli Mulaichi	V. Seetharaman	R. Sudarsanam	
1953	Ulagam	Tamil	Premaiyin Raani		M. S. Gnanamani	A. M. Rajah
1954	Penn	Tamil	Ettaadha Kilaiyil Kittaadha		R. Sudarsanam	
1954	Penn	Tamil	Sonna Sollai Marandhidalaamo		R. Sudarsanam	T. S. Bagavathi
1954	Penn	Tamil	Bhaaratha Nattukkinai Bhaaratha Naade		R. Sudarsanam	
1954	Penn	Tamil	Vaal Munaiyin Sakthiyinaal Ulagai Aaluvom		R. Sudarsanam	T. S. Bagavathi & P. Susheela
1954	Penn	Tamil	Agila Bhaaradha Penngal		R. Sudarsanam	
1954	Sorgavasal	Tamil	Maasillaatha Maamani Manonmani		Viswanathan–Ramamoorthy	K. R. Ramasamy
1954	Thookku Thookki	Tamil	Inba Nilai Kaana Innum En	A. Maruthakasi	G. Ramanathan	
1954	Thookku Thookki	Tamil	Kanvazhi Pugundhu Karutthinil Kalandha	A. Maruthakasi	G. Ramanathan	T. M. Soundararajan
1954	Thookku Thookki	Tamil	Piyare Nimbal Mele	Udumalai Narayana Kavi	G. Ramanathan	V. N. Sundaram
1955	Chella Pillai	Tamil	Naadu Nadakkira Nadaiyile		R. Sudarsanam	T. M. Soundararajan
1955	Pennarasi	Tamil	Inbam Enggum Ingge	A. Maruthakasi	K. V. Mahadevan	Thiruchi Loganathan
1955	Pennarasi	Tamil	Chandhiran Madhiyam.... Paadhaiyin Mele Vizhiyaai Vaitthu		K. V. Mahadevan	Thiruchi Loganathan, S. C. Krishnan & U. R. Chandra
1955	Town Bus	Tamil	Chittukkuruvi Chittukkuruvi Seidhi Theriyumaa	Ka. Mu. Sheriff	K. V. Mahadevan	
1955	Town Bus	Tamil	Chittukkuruvi Chittukkuruvi Seidhi Theriyumaa (Pathos)	Ka. Mu. Sheriff	K. V. Mahadevan	
1955	Town Bus	Tamil	Ponnaana Vaazhve Mannaagi Poma	Ka. Mu. Sheriff	K. V. Mahadevan	Thiruchi Loganathan & Radha Jayalakshmi
1956	Maya Mohini	Tamil	Ulagil Ullor Vaazha Nee	K. Devanarayanan	T. Chalapathi Rao	T. M. Soundarajan
1956	Naan Petra Selvam	Tamil	Aiyaave Vaarunga Inge Vaarunga	Ka. Mu. Sheriff	G. Ramanathan	
1956	Ondre Kulam	Tamil	Mangkilai Maele Poonguyil Kooviyadhu	Surabhi	S. V. Venkatraman & M. Ranga Rao	V. N. Sundaram, N. L. Ganasaraswathi, K. Rani & Kalyani
1957	Mahadhevi	Tamil	Kaakkaa Kaakkaa Maikondaa	A. Maruthakasi	Viswanathan–Ramamoorthy	
1957	Mahadhevi	Tamil	Singaara Punnagai Kannaara Kandaale	Kannadasan	Viswanathan–Ramamoorthy	R. Balasaraswathi Devi
1957	Mahadhevi	Tamil	Sevai Seivadhe Aanandham	Kannadasan	Viswanathan–Ramamoorthy	T. M. Soundararajan
1958	Maalaiyitta Mangai	Tamil	Mazhai Kooda Oru Naalum Thenaagalaam	Kannadasan	Viswanathan–Ramamoorthy	
1958	Mudhalali	Tamil	Engirundho Vandhaan En Idhayam Kavarndhaan	Ka. Mu. Sheriff	K. V. Mahadevan	
1958	Mudhalali	Tamil	Aasai Kalyaanam Nalla Anbu Kalyaanam	Ka. Mu. Sheriff	K. V. Mahadevan	
1958	Mudhalali	Tamil	1Kunguma Pottukkaaraa Kona Kiraappukkaaraa	Ka. Mu. Sheriff	K. V. Mahadevan	T. M. Soundararajan
1958	Sampoorna Ramayanam	Tamil	Pogaadhe Machan Pogaadhe	A. Maruthakasi	K. V. Mahadevan	
1958	Sampoorna Ramayanam	Tamil	Paakkraan Summa Paakraan	A. Maruthakasi	K. V. Mahadevan	
1958	Thai Pirandhal Vazhi Pirakkum	Tamil	Mannukku Maram Baaramaa	K. Muthuswamy	K. V. Mahadevan	
1959	Kaveriyin Kanavan	Tamil	Maapillai Vandhaan Maapillai Vandhaan	Thanjai N. Ramaiah Dass	K. V. Mahadevan	L. R. Eswari
1959	Kaveriyin Kanavan	Tamil	Maapillai Vandhaan Maapillai Vandhaan	Thanjai N. Ramaiah Dass	K. V. Mahadevan	
1959	Madhavi	Tamil	Thottakkaara Chinna Maamaa	Ka. Mu. Sheriff	K. V. Mahadevan	Seerkazhi Govindarajan
1959	Paththarai Maathu Thangam	Tamil	Aniyaayam Adukkumaa	Ku. Sa. Krishnamoorthy	G. Govindarajulu Naidu & Tiruvenkadu Selvarathinam	
1960	Engal Selvi	Tamil	Ambuli Maamaa Varuvaaye	Kuyilan	K. V. Mahadevan	A. L. Raghavan
1960	Ivan Avanethan	Tamil	Edhu Nijam Edhu Poi	M. S. Subramaniam	M. Ranga Rao	S. C. Krishnan
1960	Kaithi Kannayiram	Tamil	Sundelikkum Sundelikkum Thirumanamaam	A. Maruthakasi	K. V. Mahadevan	
1960	Kalathur Kannamma	Tamil	Ammaavum Neeye Appaavum Neeye	T. K. Sundara Vathiyar	R. Sudarsanam	
1960	Kalathur Kannamma	Tamil	Ammaavum Neeye Appaavum Neeye (Pathos)	T. K. Sundara Vathiyar	R. Sudarsanam	
1960	Kalathur Kannamma	Tamil	Unnai Kandu Mayangaadha Mirugamundo	Kothamangalam Subbu	R. Sudarsanam	S. C. Krishnan, T. M. Soundararajan & A. P. Komala
1960	Mavoori Ammayi	Telugu	Kanipenchu Talli Kaapaadu Taṇḍri		R. Sudarsanam	
1960	Mavoori Ammayi	Telugu	Kanipenchu Talli Kaapaadu Taṇḍri (Pathos)		R. Sudarsanam	
1960	Mavoori Ammayi	Telugu	Ee Byooṭīlo Nanu Minnche Mr̥gamundaa		R. Sudarsanam	Madhavapeddi Satyam, Ghantasala, K. Apparao & A. P. Komala
1960	Mahalakshmi	Tamil	Chinnanchiru Kannan Andha Singaara Vannan	A. Maruthakasi	K. V. Mahadevan	L. R. Eswari
1960	Padikkadha Medhai	Tamil	Paditthadhanal Arivu Petror	Kannadasan	K. V. Mahadevan	
1960	Thangam Manasu Thangam	Tamil	Chinnan Chiru Veedu Onnu	A. Maruthakasi	K. V. Mahadevan	K. Jamuna Rani & L. R. Eswari
1961	Intiki Deepam Illale	Telugu	Kapupupanta Kodukulani	Acharya Aatreya	Viswanathan–Ramamoorthy	
1961	Kumudham	Tamil	Miyaaw Miyaaw Poonai Kutti	A. Maruthakasi	K. V. Mahadevan	
1962	Kavitha	Tamil	Oor Irundhum Veedu Illai	A. Maruthakasi	K. V. Mahadevan	
1962	Sengamala Theevu	Tamil	Pesiyadhu Naan Illai Kanngal Thaane	Chennai Ekalaivan	K. V. Mahadevan	
1963	Naan Vanangum Dheivam	Tamil	Naan Maraven Murali Gopala		K. V. Mahadevan	
1963	Kaithiyin Kathali	Tamil	Udhaya Sooriyan Malarnthadhaal	Thanjai N. Ramaiah Dass	K. V. Mahadevan	
1964	Amma Enge	Tamil	Ammaa Ammaa Enge Pone	Panchu Arunachalam	Vedha	
1964	School Master	Malayalam	Kilukilukkumi Kilukilukkumi	Vayalar Ramavarma	G. Devarajan	
1965	Kuzhandaiyum Deivamum	Tamil	Kozhi Oru Koottile Seval Oru Koottile		M. S. Viswanathan	
1966	Enga Pappa	Tamil	Oru Maratthil Kudi Irukkum	Kannadasan	M. S. Viswanathan	T. M. Soundararajan
1966	Iru Vallavargal	Tamil	Kuvaa Kuvaa Paappaa	Kannadasan	Vedha	
1967	Bhagyamudra	Malayalam	Mannaankattayum Kariyilayum	P. Bhaskaran	Pukazhenthi	
1967	Ponnana Vazhvu	Tamil	Kadhai Kadhaiyaam Kadhai Kadhaiyaam Kaaranamaam		K. V. Mahadevan	
1967	Ponnana Vazhvu	Tamil	Enge.... Kunguma Chimizhe Gopura Vilakke	A. Maruthakasi	K. V. Mahadevan	T. M. Soundararajan
1968	Dheiveega Uravu	Tamil	Sindhaama Sirippaa Singaara Paappaa		K. V. Mahadevan	
1968	Kalisina Manasulu	Telugu	Ammavamtidi Amta Mamchidi		Master Venu	
1968	Siritha Mugam	Tamil	Raajaatthi Koondhalukku Rojapoo Vaangi Vandhu	Shankar–Ganesh	L. R. Anjali	
1969	Chella Penn	Tamil	Amma Sonnadhu Pole	Kovai Kumaradevan	B. A. Chidambaranath	
1972	Dhikku Theriyatha Kaattil	Tamil	Poo Poova Parandhu Pogum	Vaali	M. S. Viswanathan	
1972	Naan Yen Pirandhen	Tamil	Thambikku Oru Paattu	Avinasi Mani	Shankar–Ganesh	L. R. Anjali
1972	Shakthi Leelai	Tamil	Thannai Vendravan Yaarum	Kannadasan	T. K. Ramamoorthy	
1974	Amma Appa	Tamil	Paappaa Vandhene Paadugindrene		Shyam	
1974	Devi Sri Karumari Amman	Tamil	Amma Thaaye Karumaari		Shankar–Ganesh	
1974	Devi Sri Karumari Amman	Tamil	Velli Manam Un Kovil		Shankar–Ganesh	
1974	Samarpanam	Tamil	Vetkkapada Vendum Ovvoru	Pattukottai Dhandayuthapani	Shankar–Ganesh	
1977	Vidarunna Mottukal	Malayalam	Kaattiloru Malarkkulam	Sreekumaran Thampi	G. Devarajan	Santha P. Nair
1978	Iravu 12 Mani	Tamil	Amma Akka Appa		Shankar-Ganesh	
1979	Kadamai Nenjam	Tamil	Thulli Thulli Sellum	Alangudi Somu	N. S. Thiyagarajan	
1982	Thaai Mookaambikai	Tamil	Isai Arasi Ennalum	Vaali	Ilaiyaraaja	[[S. Janaki][P. Susheela]]
1984	Vengaiyin Maindhan	Tamil	Kannaa Vaa Kannaa Vaa		Shankar–Ganesh	
1987	Nayakan	Tamil	Naan Siritthaal Deepavali	Pulamaipithan	Ilaiyaraaja	K. Jamuna Rani
1988	Paatti Sollai Thattathe	Tamil	Car Car Super Car	Vairamuthu	Chandrabose	
1988	Thaimel Aanai	Tamil	Endha Kadhai Solla	Vairamuthu	Chandrabose	K. J. Yesudas & S. P. Balasubrahmanyam
1989	Paasa Mazhai	Tamil	Oru Paattu Un Manasai	Vaali	Ilaiyaraaja	S. Janaki & Mano
1990	Aadi Velli	Tamil	Sonna Pecha Kekkanum	Vaali	Shankar–Ganesh	
1990	Dhurga	Tamil	Paappaa Paadum Paattu	Vaali	Shankar–Ganesh	
1990	Lakshmi Dhurga	Telugu	Paappaa Paade Paattaa		Shankar–Ganesh	
1991	Aadi Viratham	Tamil	Ettadukku Maaligaiyil Vataamidum	Vaali	Shankar–Ganesh	K. S. Chithra
1991	Aadi Viratham	Tamil	Aadi Velli Puthukku	Vaali	Shankar–Ganesh	K. S. Chithra & Swarnalatha
1991	Naagamma	Telugu	Chakkanaina Neralonaa	Vijaya Ratnam Gona	Shankar–Ganesh	Swarnalatha
1991	Naagamma	Telugu	Naagula Panchami	Vijaya Ratnam Gona	Shankar–Ganesh	K. S. Chithra & Swarnalatha
1991	Bhairavi	Kannada	Haadona Baa		Shankar–Ganesh	
1991	Bhairavi	Kannada	Yaho Yahu		Shankar–Ganesh	
1991	Sendhoora Devi	Tamil	Yakkaa Yakkaa Yakkaa Yakkaa Elakkaa	Vaali	Shankar–Ganesh	
1991	Sindhoora Devi	Telugu	Gajavadhanaa Devaraa		Shankar–Ganesh	
1991	Thai Poosam	Tamil	Anne Anne Anbu Anne Naagaraajane	Vaali	Shankar–Ganesh	
1991	Sravana Masam	Telugu	Anna Anna Manchi Anna		Shankar–Ganesh	
1992	Dheiva Kuzhandhai	Tamil	Aana Maamaa Aana Maamaa	Vaali	Shankar–Ganesh	
1992	Dheiva Kuzhandhai	Tamil	Aanaavum Aavanaavum Solli Thandheenga	Vaali	Shankar–Ganesh	
1992	Sivasangkari	Tamil	Mama Mama Naanthane Nagamma	Vaali	Shankar–Ganesh	Swarnalatha
1992	Sivasangkari	Tamil	Amaadi Abiraami Nalla Vazhi Nee Kaami	Vaali	Shankar–Ganesh	Swarnalatha
1992	Naga Bala	Telugu	Mama Mama Nenega Naagamma		Shankar–Ganesh	Swarnalatha
1992	Naga Bala	Telugu			Shankar–Ganesh	Swarnalatha
1993	Sivarathiri	Tamil	Naadhar Mudi Mel Irukkum	Vaali	Shankar-Ganesh	
1993	Sivarathiri	Tamil	Thenaali Raamaa Nee	Vaali	Shankar-Ganesh	
1993	Sivarathiri	Telugu	Nataraaju Haaraani Naagaraaju		Shankar-Ganesh	
1993	Sivarathiri	Telugu	Thenaali Raamanna Raa		Shankar-Ganesh	
Unreleased	Nagarathil Thirudargal	Tamil	Raajaatthi Koondhalukku Rojapoo Vaangi Vandhu		Shankar–Ganesh	L. R. Eswari
