= R. Sudarsanam =

Indian music composer

- Born: Ramakrishna Sudarsanam; 26 April 1914
- Died: 26 March 1991 (aged 76); Chennai
- Occupation: Music composer
- Children: Sadanandam Sudarsanam

Ramakrishna Sudarsanam (26 April 1914 – 26 March 1991) was an Indian music composer who worked in Tamil, Hindi, Kannada Malayalam, Telugu and Sinhala films.

== Career ==
Ramakrishna Sudarsanam entered the Tamil film industry with Thiruneelakandar in 1939. He was a very talented musician who was spotted by Music Director Sharma Brothers and who into their Music troupe. After getting a lot of experience, he started composing music along with T.A Kalyanam. He became full-fledged music composer in Movie Sakuntalai in 1940. He turned a few songs for this movie but unfortunately, he did not continue with that film due to ill health. Movie producers brought another music composer Rajagopal Sharma for the same film and used already composed Sudarsanam's tunes, but he was not credited.

Later Sudarsanam joined the AVM Studio's Saraswathi Orchestra Company and started working on dubbing for movies. His name first appeared on the silver screen in the film Sri Valli in 1945 along with Thuraiyur Rajagopal Sharma. He became a full-fledged Music Composer in the movie Naam Iruvar in 1947. Later went giving a lot of back to back superhits in films.

He is credited to have composed music for the first movie of stalwart actress and actors like Dr. Rajkumar for Kannada movie Bedara Kannappa, Sivaji Ganesan for Parasakthi, Kamal Hasan for film Kalathur Kannamma, Vaijayanthi Mala for the movie Vaazhkai.

He has introduced many singers to the South Indian film industry, and who have come became most popular and has reached great heights in film music few include S. Janaki, T .M. Soundarajan.

== Personal life ==
Sudarsanam's son, S. Sadanandam, popularly known as "Sada Master", became a guitarist and session musician in Tamil and Malayalam cinema and was a longtime member of Ilaiyaraaja's ensemble.

== Filmography ==
Year	Film	Language	Director	Banner	Notes
1940	Bhookailas	Telugu	Sundar Rao Nadkarni	Pragathi Studios	
1942	En Manaivi	Tamil	Sundar Rao Nadkarni	Pragathi Studios	
1943	Satya Harishchandra	Kannada	R. Nagendra Rao	Pragathi Studios	
1944	Harishchandra	Tamil	R. Nagendra Rao	Pragathi Studios	
1945	Sri Valli	Tamil	A. V. Meiyappan & A. T. Krishnaswamy	Pragathi Studios	
1947	Naam Iruvar	Tamil	A. V. Meiyappan	AVM Productions	
1947	Rama Rajyam	Tamil	Vijay Bhatt		
1948	Vedhala Ulagam	Tamil	A. V. Meiyappan & P. Neelakantan	AVM Productions	
1949	Vaazhkai	Tamil	A. V. Meiyappan & M. V. Raman	AVM Productions	
1949	Jeevitham	Telugu	A. V. Meiyappan & M. V. Raman	AVM Productions	Debut Film for Vyjayanthimala
1951	Bahar	Hindi	M. V. Raman	AVM Productions	
1951	Or Iravu	Tamil	P. Neelakantan	AVM Productions	
1952	Parasakthi	Tamil	Krishnan–Panju	National Pictures & AVM Productions	Debut Film for Sivaji Ganesan
1952	Velaikaran	Tamil	P. V. Krishnan	Sri Valli Productions	
1953	Gunasagari	Kannada	H. L. N. Simha	AVM Productions	
1953	Sathya Sodhanai	Tamil	H. L. N. Simha	AVM Productions	
1953	Ladki	Hindi	M. V. Raman	AVM Productions	
1954	Bedara Kannappa	Kannada	H. L. N. Simha	AVM Productions	Produced with The Karnataka Films Ltd; Debut Film for Dr. Rajkumar
1954	Kalahasti Mahatyam	Telugu	H. L. N. Simha	AVM Productions	with R. Govardhanam
1954	Penn	Tamil	M. V. Raman	AVM Productions	
1954	Sangham	Telugu	M. V. Raman	AVM Productions	
1955	Aadarshasathi	Kannada	Chitrapu Narayana Murthy	AVM Productions	with R. Govardhanam
1955	Chella Pillai	Tamil	M. V. Raman	AVM Productions	
1955	Vadina	Telugu	M. V. Raman	AVM Productions	with G. Aswathama
1956	Dosthara	Sinhala	K. Shankar	Cinemas Ltd	
1956	Kula Deivam	Tamil	Krishnan–Panju	SK Pictures	
1956	Naga Devathai	Tamil	Chitrapu Narayana Murthy	AVM Productions	with R. Govardhanam
1956	Nagula Chavithi	Telugu	Chitrapu Narayana Murthy	AVM Productions	with R. Govardhanam
1956	Sadaarama	Telugu	K. R. Seetharama Sastry	Shankar Production	with R. Govardhanam
1956	Sadaarame	Kannada	K. R. Seetharama Sastry	Shankar Production	with R. Govardhanam
1957	Parasakthi	Telugu	Krishnan–Panju	National Pictures & AVM Productions	
1958	Matwala	Hindi	M. A. Thirumugam	Devar Films	
1958	Bhakta Ravana	Tamil	K. Shankar	AVM Productions	with R. Govardhanam
1958	Bhookailas	Telugu	K. Shankar	AVM Productions	with R. Govardhanam
1958	Bhookailasa	Kannada	K. Shankar	AVM Productions	with R. Govardhanam
1959	Mamiyar Mechina Marumagal	Tamil	Krishnan–Panju	AVM Productions	
1959	Sahodhari	Tamil	A. Bhimsingh	AVM Productions	
1960	Deivapiravi	Tamil	Krishnan–Panju	Kamaal Brothers	
1960	Kalathur Kannamma	Tamil	A. Bhimsingh	AVM Productions	Debut Film for Kamal Haasan
1960	Mavoori Ammayi	Telugu	A. Bhimsingh	AVM Productions	
1960	Thilakam	Tamil	Krishnan–Panju	AVM Productions	
1961	Anumanam	Telugu	Krishnan–Panju	Kamaal Brothers	
1961	Kanyaka Parameswari Mahathyam	Telugu	A. S. A. Samy	Jupiter Pictures	
1961	Naaga Nandhini	Tamil	G. R. Nathan	B. V. N. Productions	
1961	Papa Pariharam	Telugu	A. Bhimsingh	AVM Productions & Buddha Pictures	with Viswanathan–Ramamoorthy
1962	Annai	Tamil	Krishnan–Panju	AVM Productions	
1962	Pavitra Prema	Telugu	A. Bhimsingh	AVM Productions & G. K. Productions	with Viswanathan–Ramamoorthy
1962	Penchina Prema	Telugu	Krishnan–Panju	AVM Productions	
1962	Mall Road	Hindi			
1963	Naanum Oru Penn	Tamil	A. C. Tirulokchandar	AVM Productions	
1964	Poompuhar	Tamil	P. Neelakantan	Mekala Pictures	
1965	Anbu Karangal	Tamil	K. Shankar	Shanthi Films	
1965	Ennathan Mudivu	Tamil	K. S. Gopalakrishnan	Ravi Productions	
1965	Karthigai Deepam	Tamil	A. Kasilingam	M. K. Movies	
1965	Miss Leelavathi	Kannada	M. R. Vittal	Sri Rajarajeshwari	
1965	Naadi Aada Janme	Telugu	A. C. Tirulokchandar	Srivani Films	
1965	Poomalai	Tamil	P. Neelakantan	Mekala Pictures	
1966	Mani Magudam	Tamil	S. S. Rajendran	S.S.R. Pictures	
1966	Premamayi	Kannada	M. R. Vittal	Srikanth & Srikanth Enterprises	
1967	Kudumbam	Malayalam	M. Krishnan Nair		
1967	Valiba Virundhu	Tamil	Murasoli Maran	Mekala Pictures	
1968	Bedi Bandavalu	Kannada	C. Srinivasan	Srinivas Art Productions	
1968	Thirichadi	Malayalam	Kunchacko	Excel Productions	
1968	Thalli Prema	Telugu	Srikanth	Azam Arts	
1970	Adavi Raja	Telugu	K. S. Prakash Rao	Sri Rajarajeshwari Pictures	with Satyam
1971	Bhale Papa	Telugu	K. S. Prakash Rao	Sri Kalpanalaya	
1971	Sri Krishna Rukmini Satyabhama	Kannada	K. S. L. Swamy	Raghunanadan Movies	
1976	Narada Vinodam	Telugu	Y. R. Swamy	Sri Kanteerava Studio & Chamundeshwari Studio	
1979	Hridhayathinte Nirangal	Malayalam	P. Subramaniam	Neela Productions	with G. Devarajan
