= Durga (1990 film) =

- VCD cover
- Directed by: Rama Narayanan
- Written by: Pugazhmani (dialogue)
- Screenplay by: Rama Narayanan
- Story by: Rama Narayanan
- Produced by: N. Radha
- Starring: Baby Shamili; Nizhalgal Ravi; Kanaka; Kitty
- Cinematography: N. K. Viswanathan
- Edited by: Raja
- Music by: Shankar–Ganesh
- Production company: Sri Thenandal Films
- Release date: 10 August 1990
- Running time: 116 minutes
- Country: India
- Language: Tamil

Durga is a 1990 Indian Tamil-language children's film, directed and written by Rama Narayanan, with dialogue written by Pugazhmani. It stars Baby Shamili (dual role) playing the title role, with Nizhalgal Ravi, Kanaka and Kitty in the lead while Sathyapriya, Vagai Chandrasekhar, Senthil and Vennira Aadai Moorthy play pivotal roles. The film was released on 10 August 1990 and fared well at the box office. The film was remade in Kannada as Bhairavi in 1991, with Shamili playing the same role.

== Plot ==
Durga, the only daughter of a wealthy couple, is faced with tragedy when her father passes away and her uncle attempts to take over their wealth. Matters take a turn for the worse when her mother is killed by her uncle. Kitty, an accomplice of her uncle, also plans to kill Durga to secure the fortune for himself. However, Durga manages to escape with the help of her loyal pets – Ramu the monkey and Raja the dog.

As Durga flees, she comes across Muthu, a kind-hearted man who befriends her. Meanwhile, Kannamma, a talented karakattam dancer, falls for Muthu and they both join forces to protect Durga from Kitty's clutches.

Despite their efforts, Kitty continues his hunt for Durga in order to eliminate her and take over the family's wealth. Durga returns to her home with the support of Muthu and Kannamma, which catches Kitty off guard. To complicate matters further, Kitty discovers Malliga, a girl who looks identical to Durga and is the daughter of a poor and disabled man. Kitty forces Malliga to act as Durga, threatening to harm her father if she refuses. The plan is to create chaos and in the process, he can kill the real Durga.

As the tension between the two girls builds up, a situation arises where they both have to walk over the fire in a temple to prove their true identity. Durga manages to do so successfully, but before Malliga can begin, her father appears and rescues her. He also reveals Kitty's sinister plans to everyone, and in a twist of fate, Kitty accidentally jumps into the fire and dies.

In the end, Durga accepts Malliga into her home along with Muthu and Kannamma. They all live together as a happy family, with the memories of the past safely behind them.

== Cast ==
- Baby Shamili as Durga/Mallika
- Nizhalgal Ravi as Muthu
- Kanaka as Kannamma
- Kitty as Durga's Uncle
- Sathyapriya as Lakshmi
- Chandrasekhar as Mallika's father
- P. R. Varalakshmi as Muthu's mother
- Senthil as Vellaiyan
- Vennira Aadai Moorthy as Dr. Marcosa
- Bayilvan Ranganathan as Ranga

== Soundtrack ==
Music was by Shankar–Ganesh and lyrics were written by Vaali. Harris Jayaraj was the keyboardist.

Song	Singer	Length
"Pappa Paadum Paattu"	M. S. Rajeswari	03:33
"Aadi Varum Paadi Varum"	K. S. Chithra	02:16
"Pappa Paadum Paattu" – Reprise	M. S. Rajeswari	01:43
"Papa Paadum Paattu" – reprise 2	M. S. Rajeswari	02:27
"Maari Muthu Maari"	S. P. Sailaja	05:02
