= Kottai Mariamman =

2001 film by Rama Narayanan

- DVD cover of the movie
- Directed by: Rama Narayanan
- Written by: Pugazhmani
- Based on: Mariamman
- Produced by: N. Ramaswamy; Sudhakar Reddy
- Starring: Roja, Karan, Devayani, Yuvarani
- Cinematography: N. K. Viswanathan
- Edited by: Raj Keerthi
- Music by: Deva
- Production company: Sri Thenandal Films
- Distributed by: United India Exporters
- Release date: 14 December 2001
- Running time: 142 minutes
- Country: India
- Language: Tamil
- Budget: around 75 lakhs

Kottai Mariamman is a 2001 Indian Tamil-language Hindu devotional film written and directed by Rama Narayanan. The film featured Roja as the goddess Kottai Mariamman in the title role alongside Karan as Eashwar, one of the main villains and Devayani as the devotee of the goddess. The film, which had music composed by Deva, released in December 2001. The film was dubbed in Telugu as Ammoru Thalli 2001, in Hindi as Jai Maa in around 2002-2003 and as Durga Maiya in 2002, in Odia as Devi Shakti in 2001 and in Bhojpuri as Jai Maa in 2006. The film received very positive reviews from critics.

The movie became a commercial success and a highly successful film of the year. The movie was made on a budget of about 75 lakhs and crossed over 3-4 crores at the box office and became a hit. The film was highly successful mainly because of its melodious devotional songs such as "Shri Ranganathanakku" by K. S. Chithra. The film connected with the deep emotional factors of a large amount of audience, therefore it received the attention of many viewers and received really positive reviews making it a hit. Actor Vivek was highly praised for his comedy track in the film. The actress Roja played dual roles in the film.

The movie frequently airs on Sun TV. It's Telegu dubbed version, Ammoru Talli, occasionally airs on Sun Gemini TV. It's other versions such as the Hindi version Jai Maa, also received huge amount of recognition and were loved by many.

== Plot ==
The film depicts the Story of Durga, a rural girl who is taken care and raised by the goddess Kottai Mariamman (an incarnation of the goddess Adi Shakti). It also showcases how Mantramoorthi tries to take away Kottai Mariamman's golden eye petals which contain divine powers but is ultimately defeated by the goddess. He seeks help from Eshwar, an atheist whose wife Rajeshwari is a great devotee of the goddess Kottai Mariamman. It's also seen that the goddess herself took birth as Kanmani who is Rajeshwari's daughter and saves her from Raani who insults and makes fun of Rajeshwari.

Durga's mother is killed by her father in order to steal the golden eye petals of the goddess Mariamman but is eventually slain by the goddess. After that Durga is shown as a fully grown girl who was raised by the goddess as her mother was killed and now, she has become a great devotee of the goddess and the goddess herself comes to her and feeds by her hands. On the other side, Mantramoorthi who is an evil sorcerer after 16 years of severe Tapasya, visits the site of the goddess to steal her eyes but is eventually thrown away by the goddess. Then, Eashwar is shown, who is an atheist trying to steal the eyes of the goddess unexpectedly meets Mantramoorthi and teams up with him. On the other side, raani, who's the sister of eashwar regularly makes fun of Rajeshwari, who is the wife of eashwar is tortured by raani. And, on the other side Rajesheshwari's daughter Kanmani, who is an aspect of the goddess herself saves her from the toxic environment. Kanakku, a comedic character, joins raani and makes fun of her. One day, Raani makes fun of the Prasada that Rajeshwari was about to offer to the goddess and throws the prasada on the face of the sculpture of the goddess and as a result, Raani faces the wrath of the goddess and is infected by a type of Pox but, Rajeshwari requests the goddess to infect her instead and as she said, Raani is cured and Rajeshwari is infected by the disease but is ultimately cured by the goddess as a result to kindness and devotion. On the other side, a Pandit steals the money of the goddess temple due to extreme poverty and is caught by Durga and the village is informed by her but nobody believes her, and everybody asks the goddess, but the goddess eventually proves that he didn't steal. So, Durga is upset so she ties a cloth on the eyes of the goddess as an act of innocence, but the eyes of the goddess have become vulnerable and Eashwar eventually steals the eyes. Durga tries to stop eashwar but eashwar manages to run away with the eyes. But, the eyes suddenly disappear and Eashwar is informed that his daughter Kanmani faced a severe eye related injury in an accident so, when Eashwar visits the hospital where his daughter was admitted, he gets to know that his daughter's eyes have transformed into the eye petals of the goddess which Eashwar stole and it's found that the eyes are with radha so, Eashwar informs Mantramoorthi about this and after that, Mantramoorthi tries to take the eyes from Kanmani but is punished by the goddess and thrown away. Its shown that the goddess has thousands of eyes. After that, Mantramoorthi informs Eashwar and raani that if Kanmani is killed, the goddess will be eventually destroyed so Raani and Eashwar try to kill her by poisoning her, cutting her head but eventually fail and it's proved that she is the goddess herself. One day, Durga visits Eashwar's house in search of the goddess and identifies Eashwar as the one who stole the golden eye petals of the goddess while eashwar points a gun at her, he is stopped by Raani and Raani asks Durga to meet her at night near the neem tree. Raani is ultimately killed by the goddess as raani tries to kill Durga by pointing a gun at her. The death of Raani has left Eashwar in shock and has turned Kanakku into a devotee of the goddess Kottai Mariamman.

Kanmani reveals her true form to both Durga and Rajeshwari. They identify her as the goddess herself.

The goddess vows to Rajeshwari that she will spare her husband's life until she returns from the temple.

While Rajeshwari was returning from the temple, Mantramoorthi tries to kill her but is ultimately killed and shattered into pieces by the goddess. On the other side, Eashwar tries to kill Kanmani, but Kanmani suddenly burns away his monstrous hands which he gained from the demonic powers of Mantramoorthi in order to kill Kanmani. Kanmani transforms into the goddess and tries to kill him but is requested by Rajeshwari to spare and forgive him. She ultimately forgives Eashwar and the eyes of the goddess are returned to her.

== Cast ==
- Roja as Kottai Mariamman and Durga who is a devotee of the goddess Kottai Mariamman and is raised by the goddess herself
- Karan as Eashwar, an aethist who teams up with mantramoorthi who is an evil and mysterious entity/sorcerer and tries to steal the eye petals of the goddess but is eventually defeated
- Devayani as Rajeswari who is the wife of eashwar and is humiliated by eashwar and his sister
- Vivek in a comedic role
- Yuvarani as Raani, Eashwar's sister who makes fun of Rajeshwari and tries to kill her daughter but is eventually killed by the daughter of Rajeshwari who is an incarnation of the goddess herself
- Senthil as driver
- Rami Reddy as Mantramoorthi, an evil sorcerer who tries to steal the sacred goddess eyes but is eventually slain by the goddess
- Nizhalgal Ravi as Durga's father who tried to steal the eyes of the goddess as well but was ultimately killed by the goddess
- Vennira Aadai Moorthy as Kannaku/ kannake, a comedic yet wicked character who alongside Raani makes fun of Rajeshwari
- M. S. Bhaskar as Traffic Policeman
- Vellai Subbaiah as Iyer, a priest
- Halwa Vasu as police constable
- Simran Jayram as Kanmani, who is the daughter of Rajeshwari and is an incarnation of the goddess Kottai Mariamman herself

== Soundtrack ==
The soundtrack was composed by Deva, with lyrics written by Kalidasan and Snehan. it was mainly praised for its devotion songs, and the movie became highly successful and popular for its songs.

No.	Song	Singer(s)
1.	"Solla Poren"	Deva
2.	"Vellimalar Kannatha"	Swarnalatha
3.	"Sri Ranganatharukku"	K. S. Chitra
4.	"Morandu Pudikathe"	Deva
5.	"Sarpa Sarpamaai"	Anuradha Sriram
6.	"Sri Ranganatharukku (Bit Version)"	Vaishali Unnikrishnan
7.	"Amman Dance"	Instrumental
8.	"Amman Dance"	Instrumental
