= Kalathur Kannamma =

1960 film by A. Bhimsingh

- Theatrical release poster
- Directed by: A. Bhimsingh
- Written by: Javar Seetharaman
- Produced by: A. V. Meiyappan; Kumaran; Arun Veerappan
- Starring: Gemini Ganesh; Savitri Ganesh; Kamal Haasan
- Cinematography: T. Muthuraj
- Edited by: S. Surya
- Music by: R. Sudarsanam
- Production company: AVM Productions
- Release date: 12 August 1960
- Running time: 176 minutes
- Country: India
- Language: Tamil

Kalathur Kannamma is a 1960 Indian Tamil-language romantic drama film directed by A. Bhimsingh and written by Javar Seetharaman. The film stars Gemini Ganesh, Savitri Ganesh and Kamal Haasan with the latter in his debut. It revolves around a couple — a wealthy zamindar's son and a farmer's daughter — who are separated due to circumstances, while their innocent son is brought up in an orphanage.

Kalathur Kannamma, inspired by the 1960 Chinese film Nobody's Child, was originally directed by T. Prakash Rao who left due to creative differences, resulting in Bhimsingh taking over. The film's soundtrack was composed by R. Sudarsanam.

Kalathur Kannamma was released on 12 August 1960. The film was critically acclaimed, with Haasan's performance being singled out. It was also commercially successful, running for over 100 days in theatres. It won the Certificate of Merit by the Government of India, and the President's Gold Medal award for Haasan at the age of 6. The film was reamde in Hindi as Main Chup Rahungi (with Bhimsingh returning as director), in Sinhala as Mangalika and in Telugu as Mooga Nomu.

== Plot ==
Rajalingam is the only son of Ramalingam, the zamindar of Kalathur. Kannamma is the daughter of Murugan, a farmer of the same place. On the zamindar's advice, Murugan sends his daughter to Madras for higher education. While returning from Madras, Kannamma meets Raja in the train. Noticing her respect and awe for the zamindar, Raja calls himself an electrician visiting the palace. They fall in love. A few days later, Kannamma learns the truth and to reassure her, Raja marries her secretly in a temple.

Two days later, Raja has to go abroad for higher studies. During his absence, Ramalingam learns of the marriage and orders Kannamma to forget his son. Moved by the zamindar's feelings, Kannamma promises never to mention their marriage to anyone. Ramalingam arranges Murugan and the now pregnant Kannamma to stay in a nearby town, Sevalpatti. Murugan, who is ashamed of Kannamma's secret marriage, leaves Kannamma's newborn son in an orphanage and lies that the child was stillborn. They both decide to leave the place and settle in Bangalore.

When Raja returns, he learns that Kannamma had left Kalathur. His inquiries in Sevalpatti lead him to believe that Kannamma had led an immoral life. Grief-stricken, he travels from place to place to forget Kannamma and takes to drinking as a last resort. In Bangalore, he encounters Kannamma in a dancer's house where she had come to teach the dancer's daughter. Her presence in the house and reticence to Raja's questions strengthen his belief that Kannamma is a woman of ill repute and in disgust, he returns home.

Kannamma's son Selvam grows up into an intelligent boy and lives in the orphanage in Sevalpatti. Murugan visits the orphanage and on meeting Selvam, decides to shift to Sevalpatti to be near him. Kannamma becomes a teacher in Selvam's school and feels attracted to him. She invites him to stay with her but he refuses as he has to look after Mani, a lame orphan living with him. Raja is invited to Sevalpatti by Singaram, a rich merchant who wants to marry his daughter Maduram to him, to preside over a school function. Raja takes a fascination with Selvam who acts in the school play. After the play ends, he encounters Kannamma again and orders the headmistress to dismiss her.

Mani is critically ill and Selvam turns to Raja for help. Raja brings a doctor who is unable to save Mani. Raja takes Selvam with him to the palace. At Selvam's insistence, he stops drinking and to give him a mother, decides to marry Maduram. A seriously ill Murugan confesses to Kannamma that her child is not dead and reveals the identity of Selvam. Kannamma tries to contact Selvam but does not find him in the orphanage. The news shocks Murugan and to soothe his nerves, they move back to Kalathur. In the local temple, Kannamma meets Selvam and tells him that she is his mother. On learning from him that Raja is bringing him up and is marrying shortly to find him a mother, she asks him not to mention anything about her to Raja.

Maduram learns from Selvam that he is the son of Raja, after which Singaram insists on a written undertaking that the properties of Raja would go to the children of Maduram only. The news of this conflict spreads in the village. On learning this, Murugan rushes to the palace to tell everyone the true identity of Selvam but collapses near the palace gate. Kannamma, who has followed, takes Selvam and tries to move away when she is intercepted by Raja who demands the boy back. Raja refuses to believe that Selvam is Kannamma's son and abuses Kannamma for her shameless life. Ramalingam observes that even in such a humiliating situation, Kannamma is silent and does not breathe a word about her promise to him. He is moved and acknowledges her as his daughter-in-law. Selvam is united with his parents, and Raja's marriage to Maduram is cancelled.

== Cast ==
- Gemini Ganesh as Rajalingam
- Savithri Ganesh as Kannamma
- Kamal Haasan as Selvam
- T. S. Balaiah as Ramalingam
- S. V. Subbaiah as Murugan
- Javar N. Seetharaman as Singaram
- V. R. Rajagopal as Rathnam
- Devika as Maduram
- L. Vijayalakshmi as a dancer
- S. A. Ashokan as Mayor (guest appearance)
- Manorama as Amalu
- Bindu Ghosh as Selvam's classmate (uncredited)

== Production ==
=== Development ===
After assisting A. V. Meiyappan in producing films for AVM Productions, his sons Saravanan, Murugan, Kumaran discussed producing one on their own with his son-in-law Arun Veerappan. Their mother Rajeswari told Meiyappan about this, and he gave his consent. The first story the brothers discussed was Maanam Periyadhu, but it did not shape up well. Unwilling to make a half-baked story as their inaugural production, Saravanan continued searching. Vellaichaami, an ex-employee of AVM, told Saravanan that Javar Seetharaman had been discussing a story with Meiyappan. Saravanan inquired further and learned that the story was Pattuvum Kittuvum. However, Meiyappan told Seetharaman that while the story was good, AVM could not film it. When Saravanan and his brothers learned that Seetharaman was in discussions with another production company, they ran to Meiyappan and told him that they were interested in Seetharaman's story; to their relief, Meiyappan revealed that Seetharaman would be visiting him that afternoon. After Seetharaman realised that Saravanan and his brothers were interested, he willingly gave them his story, which evolved into Kalathur Kannamma.

Impressed with T. Prakash Rao's work in Amara Deepam (1956) and Uthama Puthiran (1958), Saravanan and his brothers considered that he would be best suited to direct Kalathur Kannamma. This decision was questioned, given that AVM had its own "director unit" of which Prakash Rao was not a part. Though AVM paid its directors' salaries ranging from ₹15,000 (equivalent to ₹1.5 million or US$16,000 in 2026) to ₹20,000 (equivalent to ₹2.0 million or US$21,000 in 2026), Prakash Rao charged ₹40,000 (equivalent to ₹3.9 million or US$42,000 in 2026)—twice as much. Meiyappan, not wanting to be an obstacle to his sons' enthusiasm, approved Prakash Rao's salary. Despite Saravanan's desire, the credit for producing the film was given to Meiyappan, Kumaran, and Arun Veerappan. The story by Seetharaman was loosely adapted from two sources: the play The Forgotten Factor by the Moral Rearmament Army, and the 1960 Chinese film Nobody's Child. Cinematography was handled by T. Muthuswamy, editing by S. Surya, and art direction by H. Shantaram. S. P. Muthuraman worked as an assistant director, this being his first stint with film.

=== Casting ===
Gemini Ganesan, his last name credited as Ganesh, was cast as Rajalingam and Savitri Ganesh as the title character Kannamma. The former was paid a salary of ₹75,000 (equivalent to ₹7.4 million or US$79,000 in 2026) after initially negotiating for ₹90,000 (equivalent to ₹8.8 million or US$94,000 in 2026). Daisy Irani was originally chosen to play Rajalingam and Kannamma's son Selvam, after AVM were impressed with her performance in Yaar Paiyyan (1957). Sara Ramachandran, the family doctor of AVM, came to the AVM household with four-year old Kamal Haasan. Sara told Rajeswari that Haasan had come to meet Meiyappan as he aspired to become an actor; Haasan was eventually taken by Saravanan to Meiyappan, who asked him to act like Irani. Impressed with Haasan's performance in the audition, Meiyappan decided to replace Irani with him. Though Saravanan protested as Irani had already been already booked for the role and paid an advance of ₹10,000 (equivalent to ₹980,000 or US$10,000 in 2026), Meiyappan remained adamant as he felt Haasan was fresher and brighter than Irani. Devika, who portrayed Maduram, received a salary of ₹3,500 (equivalent to ₹340,000 or US$3,700 in 2026).

=== Filming ===
The song "Kangalil Vaarthaigal Puriyatho" was shot with many mango trees in the background. When it was decided to reshoot parts of the song, the mangoes were no longer in the trees since the season had ended. Hence, it was decided to reshoot the necessary scenes with fake mangoes hanging from the trees. The first shot filmed on Haasan was a scene featuring Kannamma feeding him upma. The song "Ammavum Neeye Appavum Neeye", picturised on Selvam, was recorded with three minutes duration, but Prakash Rao filmed its video to be only one-and-a-half minutes long. Meiyappan insisted to shoot the entire song so that Selvam could be established, and reshoot other scenes he was not satisfied with. Prakash Rao felt Meiyappan was interfering creatively and expressed his desire to quit the film, although up to nearly 8,000 feet (2,400 m) had been canned. Though Meiyappan was hesitant, Prakash Rao convinced him and left. AVM later hired A. Bhimsingh, under whose direction the film was completed. Although Bhimsingh offered to retain Prakash Rao's name in the credits, he declined. When Saravanan found another company made a film Kadavulin Kuzhandhai on the same plot as Kalathur Kannamma, he decided to release Kalathur Kannamma as soon as possible. However Meiyappan wanted to reshoot certain scenes which Saravanan was not interested in. Meiyappan felt the presentation was more important than the plot so as per his suggestion, the scenes were reshot. The final length of the film was 17,570 feet (5,360 m).

== Soundtrack ==
The music was composed by R. Sudarsanam, while the lyrics were penned by Kannadasan, Kothamangalam Subbu, Ku. Ma. Balasubramaniam, M. K. Athmanathan and T. K. Sundara Vathiyar. For the song "Arugil Vanthaal", Kannadasan came up with 56 or 58 pallavis, of which eight were finalised. The song "Aadatha Manamum" is set in the Carnatic raga known as Gourimanohari. For the song "Ammavum Neeye", the makers were not satisfied with any of the tunes composed by Sudarsanam. When violinist Chengalvarayan composed the tune of "Ammavum Neeye" on his violin, Sudarsanam created a complete tune out of it. The soundtrack received positive response, with "Ammavum Neeye" being singled out for praise.

Track listing
No.	Title	Lyrics	Singer(s)	Length
1.	"Kangalin Vaarthaigal"	Kannadasan	A. M. Rajah, P. Susheela	3:33
2.	"Sirithaalum"	Kannadasan	C. S. Jayaraman	3:30
3.	"Aadatha Manamum"	Ku. Ma. Balasubramaniam	A. M. Rajah, P. Susheela	3:19
4.	"Arugil Vanthaal"	Kannadasan	A. M. Rajah	3:23
5.	"Ammavum Neeye"	T. K. Sundara Vathiyar	M. S. Rajeswari	2:47
6.	"Unaikkandu Mayangaadha"	Kothamangalam Subbu	S. C. Krishnan, T. M. Soundararajan, M. S. Rajeswari, A. P. Komala	6:58
7.	"Malaril Madhu Edharkku"	M. K. Athmanathan	Jikki	2:93
8.	"Ammavum Neeye" (Pathos)	T. K. Sundara Vathiyar	M. S. Rajeswari	1:26
Total length:				28:29

== Release and reception ==
Kalathur Kannamma was released on 12 August 1960, and received mostly positive reviews. On 11 September 1960, Ananda Vikatan praised Kamal Haasan's performance and described Kalathur Kannamma as one of the best films in Tamil to that point. The Madras-based film magazine Movieland said, "A new star rises on the movie horizon". The article by film journalist, K. Vasudevan, praised the performance of Haasan. Kanthan of Kalki lauded the performances of the various cast members, including Subbaiah and Balaiah, and said the film could be watched once. The film was a major commercial success, running for over 100 days in theatres. It won the National Film Award for Best Feature Film in Tamil – Certificate of Merit for the Third Best Feature Film in 1961, and Haasan's performance earned him the President's Gold Medal.

== Other versions ==
Kalathur Kannamma was dubbed in Telugu as Mavoori Ammayi, which was released on 20 October 1960. The film was also remade in the same language as Mooga Nomu (1969). Bhimsingh later remade the film in Hindi as Main Chup Rahungi (1962), where "Ammavum Neeye" was re-used as "Tumhi Ho Mata". The film was remade in Sinhala as Mangalika (1963).

== In other media ==
In Udan Pirappu (1993), Vellasamy (Goundamani) as a beggar sings "Mummy-um Neeye" to the tune of "Ammavum Neeye". In Kaathala Kaathala (1998), footage of "Ammavum Neeye" is used in the title credits and Selvam morphs into Ramalingam (Haasan); he and Sundaralingam (Prabhu Deva) along with children are seen singing this song to a garbage bin.

== Bibliography ==
- Bharatan, Raju (2010). A Journey Down Melody Lane. Hay House. ISBN 9789381398050.
- Coorey, Philip (1970). The Lonely Artist: A Critical Introduction to the Films of Lester James Peries. Lake House Investments. OCLC 592060992.
- Ramachandran, Naman (2014) [2012]. Rajinikanth: The Definitive Biography. New Delhi: Penguin Books. ISBN 978-0-14-342111-5.
- Saravanan, M. (2013) [2005]. AVM 60 Cinema (in Tamil) (3rd ed.). Rajarajan Pathippagam. OCLC 1158347612.
