= Vadina =

- Theatrical release poster
- Directed by: M. V. Raman
- Written by: Toleti Venkata Reddy (dialogues)
- Screenplay by: Javar Seetharaman
- Story by: Javar Seetharaman
- Based on: Chella Pillai (1955)
- Produced by: A. V. Meiyappan
- Starring: Akkineni Nageshwara Rao; Savitri
- Cinematography: T. Muttu Swamy; Yusaif Mulji
- Edited by: M. V. Raman; S. Surya
- Music by: R. Sudarshanam; Ashwatthama
- Production company: AVM Productions
- Release date: 9 September 1955
- Country: India
- Language: Telugu

Vadina (transl. Sister-in-Law) is a 1955 Indian Telugu-language drama film, produced by A. V. Meiyappan of AVM Productions and directed by M. V. Raman. It stars Akkineni Nageshwara Rao, Savitri with music jointly composed by R. Sudarshanam and Ashwatthama. The film was a remake of the Tamil film Chella Pillai (1955).

== Cast ==
- Akkineni Nageshwara Rao as Raghu
- Savitri as Lalitha
- Relangi as Kalikaalam
- B. R. Panthulu as Narasaiah
- Gummadi as Director Yamudu
- Addola Narayana Rao as Rayabaram
- Javar Seetharaman as Basavappa
- Kannamba as Shantamma
- Pandari Bai as Chitti

== Soundtrack ==
Vadina

Film score by R. Sudarshana Ashwatthama
- Released: 1955
- Genre: Soundtrack
- Length: 37:13
- Producers: R. Sudarshana; Ashwatthama

Music composed by R. Sudarshana, Ashwatthama. Lyrics were written by Toleti Venkata Reddy. Music released on Audio Company.

S. No.	Song title	Singers	length
1	"Anandam Indegaladitu Choodandi"	Madhavapeddi Satyam, P. Susheela	3:22
2	"Yenchi Choodara Yochinci Choodara"	Ghantasala	3:17
3	"O Tingu Rangaru"	P. Susheela	3:11
4	"Jagame Sukha Samyogama"	A. M. Rajah	3:34
5	"Jojo Jojo Laali"	Madhavapeddi Satyam, P. Susheela	3:41
6	"Desamlo Velige"	Madhavapeddi Satyam	2:55
7	"Navvite Navaratnalu"	Ghantasala	3:18
8	"Nadakalo Tippuloddanta"	Madhavapeddi Satyam	2:58
9	"Nede Eenade Valareda"	P. Susheela	3:22
10	"Pillalato Illu Nimparandi"	P. Susheela	3:12
11	"Veyyaloyi Topi Veyyaloyi"	Madhavapeddi Satyam	3:23

== Boxoffice ==
- The film ran for 100 days in Vijayawada.
