= Thenandal Studio Limited =

Indian film studio founded in 1976

- Type: Production Company
- Founded: 1976
- Founder: Rama Narayanan
- Products: Film Production; Film Distribution

Thenandal Studio Limited (TSL), formerly known as Sri Thenandal Films and Sri Thenandal Pictures, is an Indian film production and distribution studio in Chennai, Tamil Nadu. It was founded by director Rama Narayanan.

== History ==
Rama Narayanan set up Sri Thenandal Films in 1976 in Chennai, and the studio has gone on to distribute over 750 films across India. Sri Thenandal Films is one of the few producers in Tamil cinema to survive beyond 100 productions along with AVM, Modern Theatres, Gemini Studios, etc.

During the late 1990s and early 2000s, Sri Thenandal Films produced and distributed a series of devotional films directed by Rama Narayanan. The quick spate of releases titled after goddesses such as Palayathu Amman (2000), Nageswari (2001), Kottai Mariamman (2001) and Annai Kaligambal (2003), saw the studio garner an image of focussing solely on Hindu devotional subjects.

In the 2010s, Murali Ramaswamy made a decision to actively purchase and distribute horror films, and experienced immediate success after Aranmanai (2014), Kanchana 2 (2015), Demonte Colony (2015) and Maya (2015) all became profitable ventures. The success of the studio's investment in that particular genre prompted them to finance smaller budget horror films including Strawberry (2015) and Jackson Durai (2016), in attempt to capitalise on the popularity of the genre across Tamil Nadu. The studio also ventured into the production of stage plays under the leadership of Murali's wife, Hema Rukmani, in 2015, and financed Chillu, a futuristic science fiction play, performed in Chennai. Hema Rukmani is the current chief executive officer (CEO) of the production house.

Following the release of Atlee's Theri, Sri Thenandal Films signed Vijay and Atlee for another project together titled Mersal for their 100th movie in September 2016. It was a box office blockbuster.

Following the release of Mersal, the studio faced financial problems and cancelled several projects that they were associated with. A proposed high budget fantasy drama titled Sangamithra directed Sundar C entered pre-production and was promoted at the Cannes Film Festival as one of India's most expensive films. The film, which was set to star Jayam Ravi, Arya and Disha Patani, went through multiple changes in its cast and budget before later being scrapped. Director Rajesh's untitled film with Santhanam, Ananda Krishnan's Oxygen with Ashok Selvan and P. S. Mithran's 7 Kinaru with Udhayanidhi Stalin were suddenly dropped, while Sasi later chose to change producers to make his film Sivappu Manjal Pachai, which was earlier titled Rettai Kombu when Thenandal Studio were the makers. The film Vallavanukkum Vallavan was delayed for several years before another studio joined as co-producers to help release the venture. Furthermore, A. R. Rahman's virtual reality film Le Musk, Ashwin Saravanan's Iravaakaalam with S. J. Suryah and Dhanush's untitled directorial venture featuring himself alongside Nagarjuna and Aditi Rao Hydari, have continued to face significant production delays. A co-director of one of their productions and a magician, who worked on Mersal, also threatened legal action against the studio for their failure to pay dues.

== Production ==
=== Selected filmography ===
- Naagam (1985)
- Veeran Veluthambi (1987)
- Sahadevan Mahadevan (1988)
- Thangamani Rangamani (1989)
- Aadi Velli (1990)
- Manaivi Oru Manickam (1990)
- Durga (1990)
- Sendhoora Devi (1991)
- Vaa Magale Vaa (1994)
- Vaanga Partner Vaanga (1994)
- Thirumbi Paar (1996)
- Manaivikku Mariyadhai (1999)
- Maya / Jayasoorya (1999)
- Thirupathi Ezhumalai Venkatesa (1999)
- Kandha Kadamba Kathir Vela (2000)
- Palayathu Amman (2000)
- Kuberan (2000)
- Nageswari (2001)
- Viswanathan Ramamoorthy (2001)
- Kottai Mariamman (2001)
- Annai Kaligambal / Shri Kalikamba (2003)
- Mannin Maindhan (2005)
- Kutti Pisasu (2010)
- Kalpana (Kannada) (2012)
- Kanna Laddu Thinna Aasaiya (2013)
- Arya Surya (2013)
- Aarathu Sinam (2016)
- Dhilluku Dhuddu (2016)
- Manal Kayiru 2 (2016)
- Podhuvaga En Manasu Thangam (2017)
- Mersal (2017)
- Vallavanukkum Vallavan (2023)
- Mr. Housekeeping (2025)
- Aadi Velli (2025)

=== Series ===
- Mandhira Punnagai (2022)

== Distribution ==
The following films are a list of films which were distributed by Sri Thenandal Films throughout Tamil Nadu, apart from their own productions:

- Engal Kural (1985)
- Gounder Veettu Mappillai (2001)
- Rudra Naagam (dubbed) (2008)
- Pachchai Manithan (dubbed) (2008)
- Arundhati (dubbed) (2009)
- Madurai Sambavam (2009)
- Marmadesam (dubbed) (2010)
- Chutti Chathan (2010)
- Rudram 2012 (2010)
- Muni 2: Kanchana (2011)
- Nanjupuram (2011)
- Appu and Pappu (Kannada) (2012)
- Raaz 3D (Hindi) (2012)
- Kamaal Dhamaal Malamaal (Hindi) (2012)
- Rush (Hindi) (2012)
- Murder 3 (Hindi) (2013)
- Zila Ghaziabad (Hindi) (2013)
- Jack the Giant Slayer (English) (2013)
- Karimedu (dubbed) (2013)
- Superman (dubbed) (2013)
- Policegiri (Hindi) (2013)
- Ruthranagaram (dubbed) (2013)
- Sonna Puriyathu (2013)
- Pasamalar (restored) (2013)
- Vizha (2013)
- Inga Enna Solluthu (2014)
- Aaha Kalyanam (2014)
- Nee Enge En Anbe (2014)
- Aranmanai (2014)
- Pisaasu (2014)
- Katham Katham (2015)
- Muni 3: Kanchana 2 (2015)
- Demonte Colony (2015)
- Baahubali: The Beginning (2015)
- Strawberry (2015)
- Maya (2015)
- Puli (2015)
- Rudhramadevi (dubbed) (2015)
- Oru Naal Iravil (2015)
- Urumeen (2015)
- Kathakali (2016)
- Aranmanai 2 (2016)
- Saahasam (2016)
- Nayyapudai (2016)
- Sowkarpettai (2016)
- Aviyal (2016)
- Sawaari (2016)
- Tea Kadai Raja (2016)
- Zero (2016)
- Hello Naan Pei Pesuren (2016)
- Idhu Namma Aalu (2016)
- Oru Naal Koothu (2016)
- Muthina Kathirikai (2016)
- Jackson Durai (2016)
- Dhilluku Dhuddu (2016)
- Kadavul Irukaan Kumaru (2016)
- Thirunaal (2016)
- Nayaki (2016)
- Sivanaagam (dubbed) (2016)
- Kaashmora (2016)
- Veera Sivaji (2016)
- Paambhu Sattai (2017)
- Kaatru Veliyidai (2017)
- Mersal (2017)
- Velaikkaran (2017)
- Aaruthra (2018)
- Euphoria (2026)
