= Engal Selvi =

1960 Tamil-language drama film

- Theatrical release poster
- Directed by: D. Yoganand
- Written by: Maran
- Produced by: T. E. Vasudevan
- Starring: Akkineni Nageswara Rao; Anjali Devi
- Cinematography: Adhi M. Irani
- Edited by: M. S. Mani
- Music by: K. V. Mahadevan
- Production company: Associate Producers
- Release date: 8 July 1960
- Running time: 160 minutes
- Country: India
- Language: Tamil

Engal Selvi (transl. Our Daughter) is a 1960 Indian Tamil-language drama film, produced by T. E. Vasudevan and directed by D. Yoganand. It stars Akkineni Nageswara Rao and Anjali Devi, with music composed by K. V. Mahadevan. The film was a remake of Hindi film Lajwanti. The film was dubbed into Telugu as Kanna Kuthuru (1960).

== Cast ==
- Anjali Devi as Kamala
- Nageswara Rao as Raghu
- T. S. Balaiah
- Balaji as Ashoka
- V. R. Rajagopal
- C. K. Saraswathi
- K. R. Chellam
- Mohana
- Baby Uma as Selvi
- Dara Singh as himself (uncredited)
- King Kong as Gene Murphy (uncredited)

== Soundtrack ==
Music was composed by K. V. Mahadevan.

No.	Title	Lyrics	Singer(s)	Length
1.	"Sollathaan Ninaikiren"	Kannadasan	P. Susheela	03:23
2.	"Vaarayo Vaarayo"	A. Maruthakasi	P. Susheela	01:34
3.	"Enna Peru Vaikkalaam"	Kannadasan	K. Jamuna Rani, P. Leela, L. R. Eswari	04:38
4.	"Sila Sila Aandugal Munnam"	Kuyilan	P. Leela & group	03:32
5.	"Ambuli Maamaa Varuvaayaa"	Kuyilan	A. L. Raghavan, M. S. Rajeswari & group	03:57
6.	"Unnai Nambi Aval Irundhaal"	Kuyilan	P. B. Srinivas	03:11
7.	"Jaya Jaya"	Kavi Rajagopal	V. N. Sundharam
8.	"Sollathan Ninaikiren (another song)"	Kannadasan	P. Susheela, K. Jamuna Rani & group

== Production ==
The film had a wrestling match between Dara Singh and King Kong. The producer said while the shooting of the match was in progress, he noticed blood oozing from King Kong's mouth. He was concerned and shouted, "cut, cut". But the wrestler King Kong wanted the blood to be seen in the film. King Kong almost hit the producer, but Dara Singh intervened and told him that he is the producer of the film, the producer reminisced in an interview later.

The producer said he had to burn copies of the film due to lack of storage facilities. However, it appears some copies have survived.

== Reception ==
The Indian Express wrote, "Anjali Devi, Nageswara Rao and Baby Uma give a convincing display of a devoted wife, a distraught husband a love-lorn child".
