= Mooga Nomu =

- Poster
- Directed by: D. Yoganand
- Screenplay by: Javar Seetharaman
- Story by: Javar Seetharaman
- Based on: Kalathur Kannamma (Tamil)
- Produced by: M. Murugan; M. Kumaran; M. Saravanan; M. Balasubramanian; M. S. Guhan
- Starring: Akkineni Nageswara Rao; Jamuna; Venniradai Nirmala
- Cinematography: P. Bhaskar Rao
- Edited by: R. Vital
- Music by: R. Govardhanam
- Production company: AVM Productions
- Release date: 13 February 1969
- Running time: 168 minutes
- Country: India
- Language: Telugu

Mooga Nomu (transl. Mute Lips) is a 1969 Indian Telugu-language drama film, produced M. Murugan, M. Saravanan and M. Kumaran of AVM Productions and directed by D. Yoganand. The film stars Akkineni Nageswara Rao, Jamuna and Venniradai Nirmala with music composed by R. Govardhanam. It is a remake of the studio's Tamil film Kalathur Kannamma (1960). The film was released on 13 February 1969.

== Cast ==
- Akkineni Nageswara Rao as Venu
- Jamuna as Gauri
- Vennira Aadai Nirmala as Rajani
- S. V. Ranga Rao as Rao Bahadur Raja Veera Venkata Satyanarayana
- V. Nagayya as Somaiah
- Rajanala as Subbaiah
- Padmanabham as Ranganna
- Vijaya Lalitha as Rambha
- Geetanjali as Manga
- Master Brahmaji as Gopi
- Master Visweswara Rao

== Soundtrack ==
Music composed by R. Govardhanam.

Song title	Lyrics	Singers	length
"Pagadala Jabili"	Aarudra	Ghantasala, P. Susheela	3:30
"Ee Vela Naalo"	C. Narayana Reddy	Ghantasala, P. Susheela	3:59
"Nijamaina Kalayaina"	Daasarathi	Ghantasala	4:03
"Ala Unte Ela"	C. Narayana Reddy	P. Susheela	3:24
"Gonthu Vippi"	Kosaraju	Pithapuram, P. Susheela	9:17
"Tallivi Neeve Tandrivi Neeve"	Aarudra	P. Susheela	3:11
"Ooru Marina"	Aarudra	Ghantasala	2:59
