= Chella Pillai =

1955 film directed by M. V. Raman

- Theatrical release poster
- Directed by: M. V. Raman
- Written by: Javar Seetharaman
- Produced by: A. V. Meiyappan
- Starring: K. R. Ramasamy; Savitri
- Cinematography: T. Muthusamy; Yusuf Mulji
- Edited by: M. V. Raman; Surya
- Music by: R. Sudarsanam
- Production company: AVM Productions
- Release date: 24 June 1955
- Running time: 141 minutes
- Country: India
- Language: Tamil

Chella Pillai (transl. Dear Child) is a 1955 Indian Tamil-language comedy drama film directed by M. V. Raman and produced by A. V. Meiyappan of AVM Productions. The screenplay was written by Javar Seetharaman. Music was composed by R. Sudarsanam. It stars K. R. Ramasamy and Savitri, with T. S. Balaiah, B. R. Panthulu, P. Kannamba, Pandari Bai, K. A. Thangavelu, Javar Seetharaman and Kaka Radhakrishnan in supporting roles. The film was remade in Telugu as Vadina (1955).

== Cast ==
- K. R. Ramasamy as Mani
- Savitri as Dancer Lalitha
- T. S. Balaiah as Yaman
- B. R. Panthulu as Paramasivam
- P. Kannamba as Kalyani
- K. A. Thangavelu as Avatharam
- Pandari Bai as Anjalai
- Javar Seetharaman as Madabova
- Kaka Radhakrishnan
- P. D. Sambandam as Murugan
- C. V. V. Panthulu as Deena Dhayalan
- Vadhiraj as Nalan, Mani's friend

== Soundtrack ==
Music was by R. Sudarsanam and lyrics were written by Udumalai Narayana Kavi, K. P. Kamakshi, Ku. Ma. Balasubramaniam, and V. Seetharaman.

Song	Singer	Lyrics	Length(m:ss)
"Thaannalae Varum Kaasu"	P. Susheela		03:02
"Sirppiyin Kai Paadatha"	K. R. Ramasamy		02:41
"Madhana Ezhil Raja" (dialogue)	Jikki & dialogues by K. R. Ramasamy	Ku. Ma. Balasubramaniam	06:07
"Naadu Nadakkira"	T. M. Soundararajan & M. S. Rajeswari		03:07
"Oh Nigarillathaa"	T. M. Soundararajan & Jikki		03:19
"Aararo Aararo.... Koil Kaalai" "Nee Paaapaa"	T. M. Soundararajan, A. L. Raghavan & P. Susheela		03:30
"Podanum Kulla Podanum"	T. M. Soundararajan		03:10
"Aaraadha Thuyaram"	T. S. Bagavathi		03:09
"Aanandham Inge Irukku"	T. M. Soundararajan & Jikki		03:09
"Nadakkum Pothu"	T. M. Soundararajan		03:22
"Kaniyum Suvaiyum Servadhu Pole"	K. R. Ramasamy		03:11
"Amaithiyethada.... Amaithiyethada"	C. S. Jayaraman		02:59
