= Sendhoora Devi =

- DVD cover
- Directed by: Rama Narayanan
- Written by: Rama Narayanan; Pugazhmani (dialogues)
- Produced by: N. Radha
- Starring: Vivek; Kanaka; Shamili
- Cinematography: N. K. Viswanathan
- Edited by: Rajkeerthi
- Music by: Shankar–Ganesh
- Production company: Sri Thenandal Films
- Release date: 22 June 1991
- Running time: 125 minutes
- Country: India
- Language: Tamil

Sendhoora Devi (also spelled Senthura Devi) is a 1991 Indian Tamil-language children's comedy drama film directed by Rama Narayanan. The film stars Vivek, Kanaka and Shamili, with Senthil, Vennira Aadai Moorthy, Kumarimuthu and Kitty playing supporting roles. It was released on 22 June 1991.

== Plot ==
Sindhu and Nandu are twin sisters but they were raised separately with no knowledge of each other. Their parents got divorced a few years back. Sindhu lives with her mother Selvi and grandfather Somasundaram while Nandu lives with her father Gopal. Gopal is a popular veterinarian and has four animals in his house : the elephant Chellappa (fan of Super Star Rajinikanth), the dog Bhairavan (fan of Ulaga Nayagan Kamalahasan), the monkey Ramu (fan of Ungal Sathyaraj) and the horse Madurai Veeran(fan of Captain Vijayakanth). Nandu spends a lot of time with her animals, she considers them like her friends.

One day, the criminal Jagannath ask Gopal to put two tubes (containing top secret information) in his horses' belly. Jagannath has to send the horses to Hong Kong as soon as possible. Gopal refuses to perform surgery on horses in good health and he doesn't want to break the law. Jagannath has no other choice than to kidnap Gopal's daughter. Jagannath's henchmen kidnap both of his daughters and they lock them up in a room. Sindhu and Nandu realise that they are sisters, and flee away from the place thanks to Nandu's animals. The girls hide the tubes behind a huge Mariamman statue. The girls want to unite their parents, so the twins swap their places to convince their parents. In the meantime, Jagannath is urged to recover the tubes. What transpires next forms the rest of the story.

== Cast ==
- Vivek as Gopal
- Kanaka as Selvi
- Shamili as Sindhu and Nandu
- Senthil as Vathalagundu Vaiyapuri
- Vennira Aadai Moorthy as Somasundaram, Selvi's father
- Kumarimuthu as Somasundaram's secretary
- Kitty as Jagannath
- Bindu Ghosh as Devotee
- Sheela
- Kullamani
- Marthandan as Restaurant waiter
- Vignesh
- P. T. C
- Perarasu as Villager
- Sakkarai
- Kumar
- Vm. Manohar

== Soundtrack ==
The soundtrack was composed by Shankar–Ganesh, with lyrics written by Vaali.

Song	Singer(s)	Duration
"Yeaka Yeaka"	M. S. Rajeswari	5:26
"Enappan Allava"	Shakthi Shanmugam	3:59
"Gangaimudhal"	S. P. Sailaja	4:38
"Guruvaayour Keshava"	Baby Kalpana	4:37
