= Kitty (actor) =

Indian actor, director and screenwriter

- Born: Raja Krishnamoorthy; 26 November 1952 (age 73); Bombay, Bombay State (now Mumbai, Maharashtra), India
- Other name: Kitty
- Occupations: Film director screenwriter Actor
- Years active: 1987–present

Raja Krishnamoorthy, popularly known as Kitty is an Indian director, screenwriter and actor, primarily working in the Tamil film industry. Notable also for his work in Telugu, Malayalam, and Hindi cinema, he directed the film Dasarathan (1993). He made his acting debut in Mani Ratnam's Nayakan, released in 1987.

== Early life ==
He was born and brought up in Bombay (now Mumbai). He worked as Union General Secretary while studying college, his principal recommended him to pursue management course. He subsequently studied on Bajaj institute and become an HR. He then shifted to Chennai and worked as manager at Chola Hotel and was therefore known as "Chola" Krishnamurthy. He wrote short stories for Saavi magazine through which he gained friendship with Kamal Haasan and Mani Ratnam. He briefly worked as General Manager at Enfield which he quit to pursue acting as a career. Ratnam recommended Kitty to join as assistant director for Nayakan (1987) while also playing a small role in it. He played negative roles in Soora Samharam and Sathya both starring Haasan.

He has done his masters in management studies from Jamnalal Bajaj Institute of Management Studies, Mumbai, 1975. He started with Mukund Iron & Steel as Management Trainee and Personnel Officer; he was with ITC Welcome Group as Personnel Manager and Regional Personnel Manager, and subsequently, with Enfield India Limited as General Manager (Human Resources). Between June 2000 and March 2002, he worked actively with Polaris Software Lab Ltd., an organization of 2600 people, as consultant and President of Human Resources. From July 2002 to August 2005, he was leading the Consulting and training Division, as Principal Consultant – at ProLease India Pvt. Ltd., part of the Washington DC–based Interpro Group. Currently, he heads the Consulting and Training Division and directs the HRD function at talent Maximus.

== Other works ==
Apart from acting, he is the director HRD of Talent Maximus India Ltd. He wrote a book called Rajini Punchtantra: Business and Life management. He has contested in 2016 Tamil Nadu Legislative Assembly election in Velachery constituency as an Independent candidate and lost the election.

== Filmography ==
=== Tamil films ===
==== As actor ====
| Year | Film | Role | Notes |
|---|---|---|---|
| 1987 | Nayakan | Shaktivelu's father | |
| 1988 | En Thangachi Padichava | Karunakaran | |
| 1988 | Nallavan | Vikram | |
| 1988 | Sathya | Dhandapani | Voice dubbed by SPB |
| 1988 | Kadarkarai Thaagam | Govind | |
| 1988 | Soora Samhaaram | Mohandas | |
| 1989 | Vaaikolupu | Suguvanam | |
| 1989 | Raja Chinna Roja | Bhaskar's associate | |
| 1989 | Raaja Raajathan | | |
| 1989 | Anbu Kattalai | | |
| 1989 | Thaai Naadu | Lieutenant Colonel Prithiviraj | |
| 1989 | Thalaippu Seithigal | | |
| 1990 | Sandhana Kaatru | Police Inspector | |
| 1990 | Jagathalaprathapan | Subash | |
| 1990 | Adhisaya Manithan | Sebastian | |
| 1990 | Durga | Durga's uncle | |
| 1990 | Paalam | ACP Rajan Sharma | |
| 1990 | Sathya Vaakku | | |
| 1991 | Vetri Padigal | | Guest appearance |
| 1991 | Sendhoora Devi | Jagannath | |
| 1991 | Vasanthakala Paravai | | |
| 1991 | Nenjamundu Nermaiyundu | | |
| 1991 | Thalapathi | Inspector | |
| 1992 | Oor Mariyadhai | Muthupandi Thevar | Guest appearance |
| 1992 | Surieyan | | |
| 1993 | Aadhityan | Zamindar | |
| 1994 | Pavithra | Dr. Nambiar | |
| 1995 | Baashha | Police Commissioner | |
| 1995 | Bombay | Basheer Bhai | |
| 1995 | Karnaa | Karnaa's adopted father | |
| 1995 | Mayabazar | Moorthy | |
| 1995 | Nadodi Mannan | Meenakshi's father | |
| 1995 | Periya Kudumbam | Sundarapandi | |
| 1996 | Krishna | Lizy's father | |
| 1996 | Nethaji | Karuna Murthy | |
| 1997 | Arunachalam | Kurian | |
| 1997 | Raman Abdullah | | |
| 1998 | Dhinamdhorum | Aadhi's father | |
| 2000 | Unnai Kodu Ennai Tharuven | | |
| 2001 | Minnale | Reena's father | |
| 2001 | Badri | Badri's father | |
| 2002 | Baba | Bhai | |
| 2002 | Ivan | | |
| 2009 | Ananda Thandavam | Raghu's father | |
| 2010 | Vinnaithaandi Varuvaayaa | Sivakumar – Karthik's father | |
| 2013 | Chennaiyil Oru Naal | | |
| 2013 | Singam II | Minister Sethuraman | |
| 2013 | Mathapoo | Pooja's father | |
| 2014 | Ramanujan | Seshu Iyer | |
| 2014 | Appuchi Gramam | ISRO Scientist | |
| 2015 | JK Enum Nanbanin Vaazhkai | JK's father | |
| 2015 | Eli | DIG Rangarajan | |
| 2015 | Yagavarayinum Naa Kaakka | Mudaliar's assistant | |
| 2016 | Saithan | Psychiatrist | |
| 2017 | Aramm | Government Official | |
| 2022 | Vezham | Joseph | |
| 2023 | Farhana | | |
| 2023 | Pichaikkaran 2 | | |
| 2024 | Joshua Imai Pol Kaakha | Chidambaram Krishnamoorthy | |
| 2024 | Neela Nira Sooriyan | | |
| 2026 | Karuppu | Court witness | |

==== As director ====
| Year | Film | Notes |
|---|---|---|
| 1993 | Dasarathan | |
| 1996 | Krishna | |

==== As dubbing artist ====
| Year | Film | Actor | Notes |
|---|---|---|---|
| 1994 | Kaadhalan | Girish Karnad | |
| 1997 | Minsara Kanavu | Girish Karnad | |
| 1998 | Kannedhirey Thondrinal | Rathan | |
| 1998 | Uyire | | for the character extremist chief |
| 2004 | Chellamae | Girish Karnad | |
| 2016 | 24 | Girish Karnad | |

=== As lyricist ===
| Year | Film | Song(s) | Notes |
|---|---|---|---|
| 1993 | Dasarathan | "Chinna Ponnu", "Unnai Kandu" | |

=== Other language films ===
==== Telugu films ====
| Year | Film | Role |
|---|---|---|
| 1989 | Muddula Mavayya | |
| 1990 | Doctor Bhavani | |
| 1990 | Lorry Driver | Ranganayakulu |
| 1990 | Rao Gari Intlo Rowdy | Alexander |
| 1992 | Laati | |
| 1997 | Hitler | Aadiseshu |
| 1997 | Devudu | MLA Sarweswara Rao |
| 1999 | Thammudu | Viswanadh |
| 2010 | Rakht Charitra | Narasimha Reddy |
| 2010 | Rakht Charitra II | Narasimha Reddy |
| 2016 | Malupu | Mudaliar's Assistant |
| 2016 | Sarrainodu | CM |

==== Malayalam films ====
| Year | Film | Role |
|---|---|---|
| 1990 | Arhatha | Factory MD |
| 1994 | The City | Sharma |
| 1996 | Yuvathurki | Jaypal |
| 1996 | Mahathma | David Abraham |
| 1997 | Masmaram | Darshan Das |
| 1997 | Gangothri | Buvaneswar Tripadi |
| 1999 | Olympiyan Anthony Adam | D.G.P Krishnan Nair |
| 2000 | Devadoothan | William Ignatius |
| 2022 | Jana Gana Mana | Alok Varma |

==== Hindi films ====
| Year | Film | Role |
|---|---|---|
| 1998 | Kabhi Na Kabhi | Kitty |
| 1999 | Dubashi | Rama Rao |
| 2001 | Nayak | Bhim Rao |
| 2004 | Phir Milenge | TJ |
| 2010 | Rakht Charitra | Narasimha Reddy |
| 2010 | Rakht Charitra II | Narasimha Reddy |

==== Television ====
| Year | Title | Role | Language | Television |
|---|---|---|---|---|
| 2010 | Rakt Sambandh | Mr. Savratkar (Sandhya's Father) | Hindi | Ndtv Imagine |
| 2012 | Dharmayutham | Sundaram | Tamil | Vijay TV |
| 2013 | Rajakumari | | Tamil | Sun TV |
| 2018 | America Mappillai | Rangarajan | Tamil | ZEE5 |
| 2019 | Fingertip season 2 | Rangarajan | Tamil | ZEE5 |
