= Krishna (1996 Tamil film) =

- Title card
- Directed by: Raja Krishnamoorthy
- Written by: Raja Krishnamoorthy; Moorthy Ramesh (dialogues)
- Produced by: Shernos Balakrishnan
- Starring: Prashanth; Kasthuri; Heera
- Cinematography: Ravinder
- Edited by: Madan Mohan
- Music by: S. A. Rajkumar
- Production company: Unique Creations
- Release date: 7 June 1996
- Running time: 133 minutes
- Country: India
- Language: Tamil

Krishna is a 1996 Indian Tamil-language romantic drama film written and directed by Raja Krishnamoorthy. The film stars Prashanth, Kasthuri and Heera. It was released on 7 June 1996, and emerged a success.

== Plot ==
Krishna and Tara have been friends in college. Tara is in love with Krishna but he does not reciprocate her love. Meanwhile, Lizy arrives as a new college girl and is bothered by groups of boys, led by Vikram. Krishna fights the goons for her and falls in love. Lizy has had contempt for men, does not trust and falls in love with difficulty.

One evening, in revenge for Lizy, Vikram gives sleeping pills in the drink of Tara. Soon after Krishna leads her, he encounters an accident. The doctor admits that Tara is pregnant with Krishna's child, which confuses Krishna's brother Dharmaraj, his wife Anandhi and Lizy. Angry, she goes home with her parents. Krishna is looking for her and falls on the family.

Vikram confesses to Tara that he has gotten her pregnant and captures her. Krishna comes to the rescue. Suddenly, Krishna is attacked but defends himself by falling from the window. Tara returns to the hospital for treatment while Krishna and Lizy unite.

== Cast ==
- Prashanth as Krishna
- Kasthuri as Lizy
- Heera as Tara
- Nassar as Assistant commissioner Dharmaraj
- Rekha as Anandhi
- Sathyapriya as Lizy's mother
- Chinni Jayanth as Daves
- Kitty as Lizy's father
- Pandu as Police constable
- Bhanuprakash as Vikram

== Soundtrack ==
The music was composed by S. A. Rajkumar. The film's audio was released by Kamal Haasan in 1994.

Song	Singers	Lyrics	Length
"Ekkachakkamma"	S. P. Balasubrahmanyam, Chorus	Raja Krishnamoorthy	03:32
"Ekkachakkamma" – 2	S. P. Balasubrahmanyam, Annupamaa	Raja Krishnamoorthy	04:33
"Idhu Nee Irukkum Nenjamadi"	Mano, Chorus	Piraisoodan	05:00
"Idhayam Idhayam"	S. A. Rajkumar, K. S. Chithra	S. A. Rajkumar	04:45
"Ingu Aadum Varai"	Shahul Hameed, Chorus	Piraisoodan	03:43
"Kickula Thanda"	Malaysia Vasudevan, P. Jayachandran	Raja Krishnamoorthy	04:33
"Oh Manmadha"	Sujatha	S. A. Rajkumar	04:57
"Dhak Dhak Kangal Thudikka"	Malgudi Subha, Annupamaa	S. A. Rajkumar	04:08

== Reception ==
D. S. Ramanujam of The Hindu wrote, "If only director Kitty (Raja Krishnamurthy) had evolved some energetic situations to this oft-repeated theme, the lethargy that sets in the second portion making the viewers burrow further into their seats could have been avoided".
