= Sadanandam =

Indian guitarist and session musician

S. Sadanandam
- Also known as: Sada Master
- Died: 29 October 2026 Chennai, Tamil Nadu, India
- Genre: Filmi
- Occupations: Guitarist, session musician, music teacher
- Instruments: Guitar, keyboard, vibraphone
- Years active: 1960s–2026

S. Sadanandam, popularly known as Sada Master, was an Indian guitarist and session musician known for his work in Tamil and Malayalam cinema. He was a longtime member of composer Ilaiyaraaja's musical ensemble, contributing guitar performances to film songs, background scores and theme music. He also worked with composers including M. S. Viswanathan, G. K. Venkatesh and Salil Chowdhury. He was the son of film composer R. Sudarsanam.

== Early life and musical training ==
Sadanandam was born into a family with connections to the South Indian film music industry. His father, R. Sudarsanam, was a music director associated with AVM Studios. His uncle was musician and conductor Govardhanam Master. Sadanandam studied music under guitarist Dhanraj Master, who also taught Ilaiyaraaja and several other musicians who later became prominent in the Indian film industry.

== Career ==
Sadanandam began working as a session musician in the 1960s. One of his early film assignments was the music recording for Yaarukkaga Azhuthan, directed by Jayakanthan and with music by S. V. Ramanan. He subsequently played for several composers, including M. S. Viswanathan, G. K. Venkatesh and Salil Chowdhury.

His guitar playing can be heard in the song "Velli Kinnam Than Thanga Kaigalil" from the film Uyarntha Manithan, composed by M. S. Viswanathan. Sadanandam and fellow guitarist Philips performed on the recording.

During the 1970s, Sadanandam became a prominent lead guitarist in Malayalam film music. He worked with several Malayalam composers and introduced Ilaiyaraaja and Gangai Amaran to opportunities in Malayalam cinema, recommending them as musicians for recording sessions. He was also part of a musical group formed with Abaswaram Ramji and Radha Vijayan in 1968.

== Association with Ilaiyaraaja ==
Sadanandam's long association with Ilaiyaraaja began around the time of Annakili (1976), Ilaiyaraaja's debut film as a composer. Sadanandam joined Ilaiyaraaja's regular musical ensemble as lead guitarist, alongside drummer and conductor Purushothaman. Gangai Amaran also played in the group, performing rhythm guitar.

Sadanandam continued working with Ilaiyaraaja for several decades, contributing to songs as well as film background scores. He described Ilaiyaraaja's detailed musical notation and instructions on dynamics as important to the performances, saying that the notation helped him understand what each composition required.

Sadanandam also appeared on screen with Ilaiyaraaja and Purushothaman in the song "Madai Thiranthu Thaavum Nathi Alai Naan" from the film Nizhalgal.

== Musical contributions ==
Sadanandam was known for using the guitar to produce sounds associated with other instruments. Ilaiyaraaja sometimes used his guitar in place of the veena, including in "Thendral Vandhu Ennai Thodum" and "Aagaya Vennilave".

Among the songs and recordings associated with his playing were "En Iniya Pon Nilave" from Moodu Pani, "Paruvame Puthiya Paadal Paadu" from Nenjathai Killathe, and "Indha Maan Unthan Sontha Maan" from Karagattakaran. He played both guitar and vibraphone in "Paruvame Puthiya Paadal Paadu".

He also contributed to the theme music of Moodu Pani and Mouna Raagam. Writer and director Suka highlighted his guitar performances in several Ilaiyaraaja compositions, including "Thulli Ezhunthathu Paatu", "Poove Chempoove", "Nalam Vaazha" and "Raamanin Mohanam".

In addition to guitar, Sadanandam played instruments including the keyboard and vibraphone. His work included performances on different types of guitars, and he was particularly recognised for his melodic lead-guitar passages and interludes.

== Teaching and later years ==
Sadanandam taught guitar to generations of students, some of whom went on to work as musicians. In later years, he recorded renditions of songs featuring his guitar performances with students and shared them on social media.

Musician and composer Gangai Amaran visited Sadanandam shortly before his death, when he was recovering from heart surgery. Amaran recalled their long friendship and Sadanandam's role in introducing him and Ilaiyaraaja to Malayalam film music.

== Death ==
Sadanandam died in Chennai on 29 October 2026.

Following his death, Ilaiyaraaja expressed sadness and described Sadanandam as a longtime friend who had worked with him from the early days of his career. He said that people who had worked and lived with him had become part of his emotions.
