= Tea Kadai Raja =

2016 Indian film by Raja Subbiah

- Release poster
- Tamil: டீ கடை ராஜா
- Directed by: Raja Subbiah
- Written by: Raja Subbiah
- Starring: Raja Subbiah; Neha Gayatri
- Cinematography: Elan
- Edited by: Muthuraj
- Production company: Funtoon Talkies
- Distributed by: Sri Thenandal Films
- Release date: 8 April 2016
- Running time: 107 minutes
- Country: India
- Language: Tamil

Tea Kadai Raja (transl. Tea, store, king) is a 2016 Indian Tamil romantic film written and directed by newcomer Raja Subbiah. The film stars Raja Subbiah and Neha Gayatri, and was released on 8 April 2016 by Sri Thenandal Films. The title Tea Kadai Raja signifies the ordinary boys who are next door. The title was inspired from the lyric "Tea Kada Raja" from the title track of Velaiyilla Pattathari (2014).

== Plot ==
The story centers around boys who live next door to each other and revolves around a love affair of one of the boys in his semi urban backdrop.

== Cast ==
- Raja Subbiah as Saravana
- Neha Gayatri as Sona
- Yogi Babu as Saravana's friend
- Madhan Bob
- Sharmila Thapa as Teacher
- Anuradha Krishna
- Moorthy
- Avanthika Mohan
- Mythili
- Rindhu Ravi
- Kattabomman
- K. P. Siva
- Sukanya

== Production ==
For Dhanush, Samantha and Amy Jackson starrer Thanga Magan, Tea Kadai Raja was speculated to be the film's title. Tea Kadai Raja then became the chosen title of debut venture of Funtoon Talkies. Director Marudhu Raja states "Some of the incidents that happened in my life are what inspired me to make this film. Everybody will be able to relate to this film," says Raja, who relates that "all of us are beautiful in one way or the other".

== Soundtrack ==
Tea Kadai Raja

Soundtrack album by Dhanraj Manickam
- Genre: Feature film soundtrack
- Label: Trend Music

Dhanraj Manickam's soundtrack consists of nine tracks including one instrumental theme and one Gana song sung by Gana Bala.

No.	Title	Lyrics	Singer(s)	Length
1.	"Ae Nanba Kelu"	Uma Subramaniam	Dhanraj Manickam	3:35
2.	"Asathuthadi Un Azhagu"	Marudhu Raja / Raja Subbiah	Dhanraj Manickam	4:06
3.	"Melinchu Pona"	Uma Subramaniam	Rupesh	4:32
4.	"Thavaniyil Tajmahal"	Sirkali Sirpi	Mathichiyam Bala, Keerti Iyer	3:59
5.	"Sandhayila Bajarula"	Gana Bala	Gana Bala	4:28
6.	"Uyire Uyire"	Dhanraj Manickam	Dhanraj Manickam	2:01
7.	"Beepa Podu (Trailer Theme)"	Dhanraj Manickam	Dhanraj Manickam	0:56
8.	"Tea Kadai Raja (Title Theme)"	Dhanraj Manickam	Dhanraj Manickam	0:48
9.	"Success of Love (Instrumental Theme)"			1:11

== Release ==
The film was released on 8 April 2016 by Sri Thenandal Films. The satellite TV rights and YouTube rights were acquired by Raj TV.
