= Jeevitham =

1950 film by M. V. Raman

- Theatrical release poster
- Directed by: M. V. Raman
- Screenplay by: K. Mugunthan; Toleti Venkata Reddy (dialogues)
- Story by: M. V. Raman
- Produced by: A. V. Meiyappan
- Starring: Vyjayanthimala; S. Varalakshmi; T. R. Ramachandran; C. H. Narayana Rao
- Narrated by: M. V. Raman
- Cinematography: T. Muthu Samy
- Edited by: M. V. Raman
- Music by: R. Sudarsanam
- Production company: A.V.M Studios
- Release date: 14 July 1950
- Running time: 170 minutes
- Country: India
- Language: Telugu

Jeevitham ('Life') is a 1950 Indian Telugu-language social guidance film produced by A. V. Meiyappan with his company AVM Productions and directed by M. V. Raman. The film stars Vyjayanthimala in her Telugu cinema debut with S. Varalakshmi, T. R. Ramachandran, and C. H. Narayana Rao forming an ensemble cast, with many actors appearing in other significant roles. Actresses Lalitha and Padmini made guest appearances as stage dancers.

The film was a remake of the 1949 Tamil film Vazhkai, which was also produced and directed by A.V. Meiyappan with Vyjayanthimala in the lead. Following the success of Vazhkai and Jeevitham, it was remade in Hindi a year later by A. V. Meiyappan as Bahar, however, the Hindi version was directed by M. V. Raman, who was the writer in the Tamil and Telugu versions. Vyjayanthimala is the only star to reprise her role in all three versions, where she made her screen and regional debut through all films.

== Plot ==
Mohini is the daughter of Sivashankaralingeswara Prasad, who marries Durgamma following Mohini's mother's death. Durgamma's brother Murthy wants to marry Mohini. Meanwhile, Mohini falls in love with Ashok, who is none other than her neighbour Pati, but she is unaware of that. When Murthy asks Prasad for Mohini's hand in marriage, he is refused by Mohini. An angry Murthy goes to the village, spends some time with Lakshmi, and leaves her. When Lakshmi becomes pregnant, she comes to the city in search of Murthy. Before she can find Murthy, she gives birth to a boy in the hospital. She meets Murthy and requests him to accept her and the child. But Murthy refuses, so she leaves the child in Pati's car, and goes to the sea to commit suicide. In the meantime, Murthy plans to cancel Mohini's marriage to Pati by using the child. Due to his claim that the child is Pati's and Lakshmi's, the marriage is cancelled. The rest of the story is about how Pati faces problems from Murthy, and how he reunites with Mohini.

== Cast ==
- Vyjayanthimala as Rani
- S. Varalakshmi as Varalakshmi
- T. R. Ramachandran as Pathi
- C. H. Narayana Rao as Murthi
- Chilakalapudi Seetha Rama Anjaneyulu as Shivashankara Lingam Prasad
- Kanchi Narasimha Rao as Basawayya
- K. Doraswamy as Venkata Subbiah
- A. Narayana Rao as Veeraswamy
- P. D. Sambandam as Seenu
- A. L. Narayana Rao as Bandivadu
- Venkumaba as Bangaramma
- Baby Vimala as child artiste
- Baby Narayanan as child artiste
- Baby Meena as child artiste
- Padmini as dancer
- Lalitha as dancer

== Production ==
For the lead female role, actress Vyjayanthimala was selected to reprise her role from the original version. She was assisted by her father, M. D. Raman, who coached her in the Telugu language to prepare her for the role. Similarly, actor T. R. Ramachandran, who also acted in the original version was chosen to reprise his role. However, during the filming his Tamil-tinged Telugu accent made the makers hesitate in using his voice, getting it dubbed by a Telugu speaking dubbing artist.

== Soundtrack ==
The music was composed by R. Sudarsanam. Dialogues and Lyrics were by Toleti Venkata Reddy. Singer is S. Varalakshmi. Playback singers are D. K. Pattammal, T. S. Bagavathi, M. S. Rajeswari, M. S. Rama Rao, M. Satyanarayana & A. G. Rathnamala.

| No. | Song | Singers | Lyrics | Length (m:ss) |
|---|---|---|---|---|
| 1 | "Priyamaina Rajaa.... Nee Kan Ninne Praminchinaa" | M. S. Rajeswari | | 02:13 |
| 2 | "Priyamaina Raani.... Nee Kan Ninne Praminchinaa" | M. Satyanarayana | | 01:50 |
| 3 | "Bhoomi Dunnaloy Rayeta Bhoomi Dunnaloy" | T. S. Bagavathi & M. S. Rajeswari | | 10:18 |
| 4 | "Nandha Gopala Neetho Ne Aadudhaanoy" | M. S. Rajeswari | | 04:49 |
| 5 | "Mana Manasu Manasu Ekamai" | M. Satyanarayana & M. S. Rajeswari | | 02:32 |
| 6 | "Melukondi Tellavare Tellaga" | S. Varalakshmi | | 02:37 |
| 7 | "Tippu Tippu Tappu Naadi" | M. S. Rajeswari | | 3:01 |
| 8 | "Aandhra Yugakka Neevi Jayamuraa" | D. K. Pattammal | | 03:13 |
| 9 | "Idena Maa Desam Ida Bharata Desam" | M. S. Rama Rao | | 03:11 |
| 10 | | M. S. Rajeswari | | |
| 11 | "Aandha Nouka Palliseemaa" | S. Varalakshmi | | 02:42 |
| 12 | "Chakkanaina Boya Rajuni" | M. S. Rajeswari & A. G. Rathnamala | | 03:45 |

== Box office ==
The film became a hit at the box office similar to the Tamil version, which was released one year earlier. Subsequently, A. V. Meiyappan made the film in Hindi as Bahar the following year, which was directed by M. V. Raman with Vyjayanthimala reprising her role in all three versions. At the end of its theatrical run, Jeevitham completed its 200th day and was the highest grossing Telugu film of 1950.
