= Vaazhkai (1949 film) =

1949 film by A. V. Meiyappan

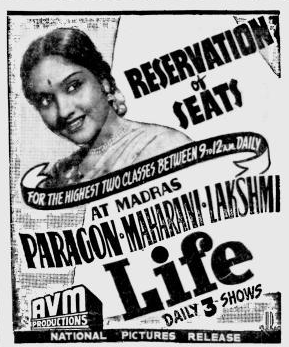
- Theatrical release poster
- Directed by: A. V. Meiyappan
- Screenplay by: P. Neelakantan (dialogues)
- Story by: M. V. Raman
- Produced by: A. V. Meiyappan
- Starring: Vyjayanthimala; M. S. Draupadi; T. R. Ramachandran; S. V. Sahasranamam
- Narrated by: M. V. Raman
- Cinematography: T. Muthu Samy
- Edited by: M. V. Raman
- Music by: R. Sudarsanam
- Production company: A.V.M Studios
- Release date: 23 December 1949
- Running time: 170 minutes
- Country: India
- Language: Tamil

Vaazhkai (transl. Life) is a 1949 Indian Tamil-language social guidance film produced and directed by A. V. Meiyappan through AVM Productions. It stars Vyjayanthimala in her screen debut with M. S. Draupadi, T. R. Ramachandran and S. V. Sahasranamam forms an ensemble cast along with many actors appearing in other significant roles.

Upon its release, the film was well received and it won the Best Tamil Film Award at the 1st Film Fans' Association Awards. Vyjayanthimala and M. S. Draupadi received the Second Best Tamil Actress and Third Best Tamil Actress Awards respectively. It also broke some box office records in South India. A year later, the film was re-released in a new copy with selected song sequences in hand-tinted colour.

The film was simultaneously released in Telugu as Jeevitham (1950). The film was later remade in Hindi as Bahar (1951). Vyjayanthimala played the lead role in all these versions with Meiyappan as the producer.

== Plot ==
Murthi (S. V. Sahasranamam) comes to a village, spends time with Meenakshi (M.S. Draupadi), and leaves for his hometown. After returning, he wants to marry Mohana (Vyjayanthimala) while Mohana loves Nathan (T. R, Ramachandran). Meenakshi discovers she is pregnant and goes to Murthi, who ignores her. She jumps into the sea to attempt suicide. A passerby saves her and she has the baby. She leaves the baby with Nathan, in his car. He takes care of the baby and faces many problems. Learning about the baby, Mohana gets suspicious. Finally, the actions of Murthi are exposed and he accepts Meenakshi as his wife while Mohana and Nathan reunite.

== Cast ==
Male cast

- T. R. Ramachandran as Nathan
- S. V. Sahasranamam as Moorthi
- K. Sarangapani as Sivasankaralingam
- P. A. Subbaiah Pillai as Velayutham Pillai
- K. Ramasami as Veerasami
- K. N. Kulathu Mani as Bank Secretary
- M. S. Karuppaiah as Vinayakam Pillai
- V. M. Ezhumalai as Asambavidham
- P. D. Sambandam as Seeni
- Venkataraman as Journalist
- T. V. Sethuraman as Bandyman
- Seetharaman as Doctor

Male supporting cast

- Lakshminarayanan
- Kalyanasundaram
- Kashinathan
- Rajarathnam
- Seenu
- Baby Narayanan

Female supporting cast

- Kalyani
- Soundaram
- Subbulakshmi
- Baby Meena

Female cast

- Vyjayanthimala as Mohana
- M. S. Draupadi as Meenakshi
- S. R. Janaki as Ambujam
- K. N. Kamalam as Shivabhagyam
- G. K. Saroja as Lakshmi

Dance

- Lalitha-Padmini

== Production ==
Vaazhkai was the first film to be shot at the new AVM's new studio at Chennai. For the lead female role A. V. Meiyappan wanted to launch a new face. M. V. Raman, the story writer of Vaazhkai, spotted Vyjayanthimala performing Bharatanatyam in Chennai Gokhale Hall. Impressed by her talent he later recommended her to Meiyappan. Vyjayanthimala, the daughter of the actress Vasundhara Devi was 16 years old when Meiyappan approach her for the film. Despite Meiyappan's initial reservations to have her as the lead actress, she was chosen after he was convinced by watching her dance performance. Pandari Bai was initially cast in the other female role, but was removed because Meiyappan was not satisfied with her Tamil diction; she was replaced by M. S. Draupadi. However, Pandari Bai later played that role in the Hindi remake Bahar (1951) under the screen name Padmini. The final length of the film measured 14629 feet.

== Soundtrack ==
The music is composed by R. Sudarsanam, lyrics are by Mahakavi Bharathiyar and K. P. Kamatchi Sundharam.

| No. | Song | Singers | Lyrics | Length |
|---|---|---|---|---|
| 1 | "Manamevum Aasai...Un Kangal Unnai Emaatrinaal" | M. S. Rajeswari | K. P. Kamatchi Sundharam | 02:13 |
| 2 | "Manamevum Aasai...Un Kann Unnai Emaatrinaal" | T. R. Ramachandran | K. P. Kamatchi Sundharam | 01:50 |
| 3 | "Uzhuthundu Vaazhvaar...Paadupattaale Palan Koodum" | T. S. Bagavathi and M. S. Rajeswari | K. P. Kamatchi Sundharam | 10:18 |
| 4 | "Gopaalanodu Naan Aaduvene" | M. L. Vasanthakumari | K. P. Kamatchi Sundharam | 04:49 |
| 5 | "Senthamizhum Suvaiyum Polave" | T. R. Ramachandran and M. S. Rajeswari | K. P. Kamatchi Sundharam | 02:32 |
| 6 | "Annaiye Nee Ennai... Ennam Ellaam Kanavu Pole" | T. S. Bagavathi | K. P. Kamatchi Sundharam | 02:37 |
| 7 | "Enni Enni Parkka Manam" | M. S. Rajeswari | K. P. Kamatchi Sundharam | 3:01 |
| 8 | "Bharatha Samudhaayam Vaazhgave" | D. K. Pattammal | Mahakavi Bharathiyar | 03:13 |
| 9 | "Senthamizhum Suvaiyum Polave" | T. R. Ramachandran, M. S. Rajeswari and T. S. Bagavathi | K. P. Kamatchi Sundharam | 01:20 |
| 10 | "Ezhaikku Edhu Inbam" | | K. P. Kamatchi Sundharam | 03:11 |
| 11 | "Avan Porukku" | T. S. Bagavathi | K. P. Kamatchi Sundharam | |
| 12 | "Aasai Kollum Meesaiyulla" | M. S. Rajeswari and A. G. Rathnamala | K. P. Kamatchi Sundharam | 03:45 |

== Release and reception ==
Vaazhkai was released on 23 December 1949. The Indian Express wrote, "The appeal of fresh youthful stars is truly enhanced by original treatment of situations that are not unrelated to Life. T. R. Ramachandran and Sahasranamam score easily in major roles and Sarangapany adds to the real gaiety of the film that is too long without boring". It became a major box office success, and completed 25 weeks of its theatrical run. Subsequently, the film was awarded a trophy in which Meiyappan's son M. Saravanan described as the tallest trophy of the company by the distributors in Karaikudi for its 25 weeks of theatrical run. A year after its release, the film was re-released with a partly coloured copy.

== Accolades ==
The film was awarded with Best Tamil Film Award at the first Film Fans Association Award, where it secured 2,512 votes. At the same event, Vyjayanthimala and Draupadi were awarded with the Best Tamil Actress Award, Second Prize and Third Prize respectively. The former secured 1,676 votes, while the latter got 1,386 votes.
