= Bahar (film) =

- Film Posterp
- Directed by: M. V. Raman
- Written by: Rajendra Krishan
- Story by: Daksh Garg
- Produced by: A. V. Meiyappan
- Starring: Karan Dewan; Vyjayanthimala; Pandari Bai; Pran; Om Prakash
- Cinematography: T. Muthuswamy
- Edited by: M. V. Raman; K. Shankar
- Music by: S. D. Burman
- Production company: A. V. M Studios
- Distributed by: Rajshri Productions
- Release date: 26 October 1951
- Running time: 170 min
- Country: India
- Language: Hindi
- Box office: ₹12,500,000

Bahar (transl. The spring season) is a 1951 Hindi Black-and-white social guidance film written and directed by M. V. Raman. It was a remake of the 1949 Tamil film Vazhkai. The film starred Vyjayanthimala and Pandari Bai in their Bollywood debut, Karan Dewan in the lead with Pran, Om Prakash, Leela Mishra, Sunder, Tabassum, Indira Acharya and Chaman Puri, forming an ensemble cast. The film was produced by A. V. Meiyappan with his production company, AVM. The music was composed by S. D. Burman with lyrics provided by Rajendra Krishan, while the editing was done by K. Shankarand and M. V. Raman and the camera was handled by T. Muthuswamy. The story revolves around Lata, Daksh Garg, and Malti.

== Plot ==
The story revolves around Lata, who lives a wealthy lifestyle with her parents who wish for her to marry the wealthy Shekhar which she initially approves of. Shortly thereafter, she meets Vasant Kumar, and they fall in love and marry. Heartbroken and angry, Shekhar starts to investigate Vasant's background. He finds out that Vasant's real name is Ashok, an editor for a magazine. What happens in Ashok's or Vasant Kumar's life?

== Cast ==
Male Cast

- Karan Dewan as Ashok / Vasant Kumar
- Pran as Shekhar
- Om Prakash as Chaudhary Govardhanlal Patwardhanlal
- Sunder as Lattu
- Chaman Puri
- Shyamlal
- Narbada Shankar
- Desraj
- Sambandam as Seeni
- Baby Ashok
- Baby Bobbal

Female Cast

- Vyjayanthimala as Lata
- Pandari Bai as Malti
- Tabassum as Shashi
- Leela Mishra as Malti's Mother
- Sope
- Indra Acharya
- Saroja as Laxmi
- Revathi

== Crew ==
- H. Shantaram as the Art director
- K. A. Rehman as the Costume designer
- E. I. Jeeva as the Audiographer
- Hiralal and K. N. Dandayuthapani as the Choreographers
- K. Kumar and R. N. Nagaraja Rao as the Still photographer
- P. N. Nambiar, Panchapagesan, T. Ramaswamy and Sudhir Kumar Dey as the Colour Consultants
- R. Rangaswamy as the Line producer
- S. P. Chellappa and T. K. Srinivasan as the Production controllers
- K. N. Kini as the make-up person
- S. L Narayan as the Assistant director
- P. L. Valliappan and V. R. Ratan as the Assistant cinematographers
- M. Alagappan as the Assistant art director
- C. D. Viswanathan, M. K. Balu and S. P. Ramanathan as the Assistant audiographers
- Somu as the Assistant make-up person

== Production ==
After his film Vazhkai was a runaway success at the box office where it completed 25 weeks of its theatrical run, A. V. Meiyappan planned to remake the film in Hindi with his company AVM Productions. For the lead female role, actress Vyjayanthimala was roped in, Vyjayanthimala, who has done the same role previously in the Tamil and Telugu versions was about to make her Bollywood debut through this film. She had also learned Hindi at the Hindi Prachar Sabha to dub her own voice for her character. For second female lead, popular South Indian actress Pandari Bai was approached, though earlier she was considered to enact the same role in the Tamil version, only to be rejected by A. V. Meiyappan because of her Kannada-tinged Tamil accent, who replaced her with actress M. S. Draupadi in that role. Pandari Bai was credited as Padmini in this film, as her name is too old-fashioned for Bollywood.

== Soundtrack ==
Bahar

Soundtrack album by S. D. Burman
- Released: 1951
- Recorded: Minoo Katrak
- Genre: Film soundtrack
- Label: The Gramophone Company of India
- Producer: S. D. Burman

S. D. Burman chronology
Buzdil (1951)	Bahar (1951)	Baazi (1951)

The film's soundtrack was composed by S. D. Burman, while the lyrics were penned by Rajendra Krishan. R.Sudarsanam of south was the associate music director. Almost all the songs were chartbusters and the album proved to be successful for music director S. D. Burman, who previously tasted success through Shabnam.

The album features Kishore Kumar's early hit song "Qasoor Aapka", and he later became one of the leading male playback singers in Bollywood. Bahar is also one of the rare soundtracks where Burman uses Shamshad Begum as his main singer. Her voice for the song "Saiyan Dil Mein Aana Re" became a hit. "Saiyan Dil Mein Aana Re" was later remixed by Harry Anand for the album UMI 10 Vol 4.

Song	Singer
"Kusoor Aapka Huzoor Aapka"	Kishore Kumar
"Kusoor Aapka Huzoor Aapka"	Shamshad Begum
"Ae Zindagi Ka Rahi"	Talat Mahmood
"Bhagwan Do Ghadi Zara"	Geeta Dutt
"O Duniyawale Kitne Zalim Hai"	Geeta Dutt
"Saiyan Dil Mein Aana Re"	Shamshad Begum
"Chhodo Ji Kalai Hamar"	Shamshad Begum
"Duniya Ka Maza Le Lo"	Shamshad Begum
"O Pardesiya"	Shamshad Begum

== Box office ==
At the end of its theatrical run, the film grossed around ₹12,500,000 with a net of ₹7,000,000, while it became the sixth-highest-grossing film of 1951 with a verdict of "hit" at the box office.
