= Audiography =

Audio engineering in Indian TV and film production

Audiography ("writing sound") within Indian-style filmmaking, is the audio engineering performed by the sound department of a film or TV production; this includes sound recording, editing, mixing and sound design (formerly sound effects laying) but excludes musical composition, songwriting and choreography.

An audiographer is responsible for more aspects of sound in film production than their more specialised Western world counterpart. The responsibilities include production sound recording, dialogue editing, sound supervising, sound effects editing (sound design), ADR editing, Foley editing and sound mixing (dubbing), re-recording and mastering the sound to specified speculation to required media.

A degree or diploma in audiography or audio electronics are the usual qualifications for the job.

== See also ==
- Director of audiography
- National Film Award for Best Audiography
