= A. V. Meiyappan =

Indian film producer, film director and screenwriter

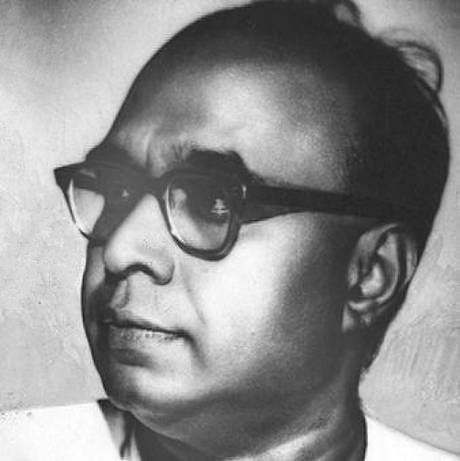
- Born: Avichi Meiyappa Chettiar; 28 July 1907; Karaikudi, Madras Presidency, British India
- Died: 12 August 1979 (aged 72); Madras, Tamil Nadu, India
- Occupations: Film producer; Film director; Screenwriter
- Years active: 1934–1973
- Spouses: Alamelu Meiyappan; Rajeswari Meiyappan
- Children: 12, including M. Saravanan

Avichi Meiyappa Chettiar (28 July 1907 – 12 August 1979), also known as A. V. Meiyappan, A. V. Meiyappa Chettiar or AVM, was an Indian film producer, film director and screenwriter who established AVM Productions in Vadapalani, Chennai. He is widely regarded as one of the pioneers of Tamil cinema, and one of three movie moguls of the South Indian film industry along with S. S. Vasan and L. V. Prasad. His production company AVM Productions is the only production company in Kollywood (Tamil film industry) to run successfully for five decades and three generations.

AVM was born in Karaikudi in a well-to-do Nagarathar family. He moved to Chennai (then known as Madras) at an early age and established Saraswathi Stores which sold gramophone records. Subsequently, he entered the film industry and started directing his own films. After some initial setbacks, AVM delivered a string of hits in the early 1940s. Following the immense success of his 1947 film Nam Iruvar, AVM moved to film production and established AVM Productions in Chennai, first at Santhome and then at Kodambakkam. In 1951, AVM entered the Hindi film industry with the film Bahar starring Vyjayanthimala. By the time he died in 1979, he had produced 167 films.

Notable films produced by AVM Productions are Vazhkai, Bahar, Parasakthi, Hum Panchhi Ek Daal Ke, Bhookailas, Kalathur Kannamma, Server Sundaram and Major Chandrakanth. AVM also directed a number of films in the 1930s and 1940s, the notable ones being Alli Arjuna, Bhookailas, Sabapathy, Sri Valli and Nam Iruvar.

== Early life ==
AVM was born in Karaikudi on 28 July 1907 to Nagarathar family of father Avichi Chettiar and mother Lakshmi Achi. Avichi Chettiar owned a department store called AV & Sons which sold gramophone records. At an early age, AVM envisioned better prospects in the trade of manufacturing records than simply selling them. Hence, he moved to Madras with his friends K.S. Narayan Iyengar and Subbaiah Chettiar and established a new firm called Saraswathi Stores on 9 September 1932. This new firm also manufactured gramophone records apart from selling them. In this new venture, he got excellent support from the manager K.P. Varadachari and his lawyer friend Thoothukudi Govindachari Raghavachari. Some of AVM's early productions were dramas on mythological subjects like Ramayanam.

== Early film career ==
With the dawn of the talkies, AVM established the Saraswathi Sound Productions. In 1935, AVM made his debut as a producer with the Tamil film Alli Arjuna which performed miserably at the box-office. His next venture Ratnavali was another failure. He then teamed up with Jayanthilal, a cinema house owner and promoted a new company, Pragati Pictures Ltd.

In 1938, AVM bought the rights for the Tamil remake of a Marathi film on the boyhood of Lord Krishna. This film Nandakumar was an average grosser. AVM introduced a 14-year-old boy, T. R. Mahalingam, for the part of the young Lord Krishna. This young boy would later become an efficient singer turning in a number of melodious hits. Lalitha Venkataraman sang for the character Devaki making Nandakumar the first film to introduce the concept of playback singing in the Tamil film industry. Nandakumar was also one of the first Tamil movies to be shot on location as AVM leased the Club House off Mount Road in Chennai to shoot scenes without erecting sets.

AVM started his own studios in 1940 and named it Pragathi Studios. In the same year, AVM produced Bhookailas which became one of the most popular film versions of the Ramayana. The film was made in Telugu, it was a famous Kannada play and its lead actors were from Kannada cinema and it was directed by Sundar Rao Nadkarni from Karnataka, who had received his training in Bombay. AVM's comedy flick Sabapathy(1941) starring T.R. Ramachandran, K. Sarangapani and Kali N. Ratnam was a runaway hit as also Poli Panchali, another comedy. Sabapathy eventually emerged as one of the greatest comedy films of the era. He followed this with another hit En Manaivi.

In 1943, he produced the film Harischandra in Kannada based on the legend of a king who attempted to kill his own son to defend justice. The next year, the film was dubbed into Tamil making it the first Indian film to be dubbed from one language to another. During the making of Sri Valli in 1945, he employed singer Periyanayaki to sing for actress Rukmini. This was AVM's second film to make use of playback. Pragati technicians worked round the clock to synchronise voice and lip. Reels were shipped back and forth in cars and trains between Madras and Karaikkudi to ensure good quality.

== AVM Productions ==
Logo of AVM Productions in its early days

On 14 November 1945, riding on the phenomenal success of his first few films, AVM established his new production company, AVM Productions at Santhome, Chennai. He wanted to start his studio in Kodambakkam but was unable to, due to the acute power shortage during the Second World War. Left with no other choice, AVM established his studio at his hometown of Karaikudi. AVM's first film under the banner of AVM Productions was Vedhala Ulagam.

In 1947, AVM produced the film Nam Iruvar based on S. V. Sahasranamam's play of the same name. Reflecting the intense patriotic fervour and hope which engulfed the newborn nation, the film released in January 1947 after six months of shooting and was "a thundering success". The story begins with a Subramania Bharati anniversary and ends with Gandhi's 77th birthday celebrations. The success of Naam Iruvar was followed by the success of Vedhala Ulagam in 1948 and Vazhkai in 1949. Vazhkai saw the introduction of Vyjayanthimala who would later emerge as one of the top film stars of India. The film ran for 25 weeks and was released as Jeevitham (1949) in Telugu and Bahar in Hindi. With the success of Vazhkai, AVM Productions began to produce films in Tamil, Telugu, Kannada, Bengali and even Sinhalese. Following India's independence, the power shortages had been met and AVM studios shifted to the sprawling location in Kodambakkam chosen by AVM, in the year 1948.

== The 1950s ==
The decade of the 1950s was a honeymoon period for AVM Productions which turned out a series of hits. The early years were marked by AVM's attempts to conquer the Hindi film industry.

In 1952, AVM's Tamil film Parasakthi released in theatres all over Madras and was an instant success. With a powerful storyline and fiery dialogues by a future Chief Minister of Tamil Nadu, M. Karunanidhi, the film preached social revolution and questioned the authority of Hindu temple priests. Sivaji Ganesan, then a newcomer, was cast in the lead role. By the mid-1950s, he had emerged as one of the top-stars in Kollywood.

Sivaji also starred in AVM's next Tamil film Andha Naal (1954) directed by S. Balachander. The film, the first film without any songs to be released in any Indian language, was about a radio engineer who intrigues with the invading Japanese during the Second World War and is eventually killed by his wife. The style of narration had been heavily borrowed from Akira Kurosawa's Rashomon.

In 1953, AVM produced the Kannada film Jatakaphala which was dubbed into Jatakam in Tamil and Jatakaphalam in Telugu. In 1958, AVM made Bhookailas in Telugu, which triggered the "golden age of Telugu cinema". It was subsequently remade as Bhakta Ravana in Tamil and Bhakti Mahima in Hindi.

== The 1960s ==
In 1961, AVM produced the Telugu film Papa Pariharam which was a remake of the Tamil film Pavamanippu which released in the same year. Both were directed by eminent director A. Bhimsingh and starred Shivaji Ganesan, Gemini Ganesan, Savitri and Devika. Like most of AVM's early films, Pavamanippu too had a storyline based on the Second World War.

Kalathur Kannamma in 1960 saw the introduction of another star in Tamil cinema, the thespian Kamal Haasan who played an unforgettable supporting role as a young orphan. He was barely six years old at the time.

His next Tamil venture Server Sundaram (1964) featuring Nagesh, who was a budding comedian then and debutant Major Sundarrajan was a roaring success. Server Sundaram was one of Nagesh's early hits which set the pace for an illustrious career. It also launched Major Sundarrajan as a character actor in the Tamil film industry. Sundarrajan's second hit, Major Chandrakanth where his famous portrayal of title role earned him the screen name "Major" Sundarrajan was also produced by AVM.

Pavithra Prema, Penchina Prema, Naadi Aada Janme, Chitti Chellelu, Letha Manasulu and Mooga Nomu were some good Telugu films which were produced by AVM during the period. However, AVM's greatest success of the 1960s was Bhakta Prahalada which was produced in Telugu and subsequently dubbed into Tamil and Hindi. The film was based on the story of Narasimha Avatar from Hindu mythology. It was directed by Chitrapu Narayana Murthy and starred S. V. Ranga Rao as Hiranyakasyapu and Baby Rojaramani as Prahlada. Narayanmurthy had earlier directed a black-and-white version of Bhakta Prahlada in 1942 which had failed at the box-office. However, the colour version which was produced a quarter of a century later under the banner of AVM Productions was a resounding success. Of the 10 different filmised versions of the Prahlada story, the 1967 colour version remains the most famous and remembered.

Another successful film by AVM in the 1960s was the 1966 film Anbe Vaa featuring the legendary M. G. Ramachandran, Saroja Devi and Nagesh. The film was a major success and the song Rajavin Paarvai topped the charts for a long time. In 1970, AVM produced Enga Mama featuring Sivaji Ganesan. Enga Mama was a Tamil remake of the Hindi film Brahmachari produced by G. P. Sippy and performed moderately at the box-office.

== Films in Hindi ==
From the initial phase of his career, AVM was associated with a number of producers and directors from North India. His 1938 film Nandakumar was the Tamil remake of a Marathi film. His 1940 film Bhookailas was directed by Sundar Rao Nadkarni who had received his training in Bombay.

In 1951, AVM made his entry into the Hindi film industry with Bahar. Starring Vyjayanthimala, Karan Dewan, Pandari Bai, Pran, Om Prakash and Tabassum, it was a remake of the 1948 Tamil film Vazhkai. Apart from being AVM's first film in Hindi, it also marked the launch of Vyjayanthimala in the Hindi film industry. In 1954, he made Ladki, his second film in Hindi, with Vyjayanthimala again in the lead. Both these films were directed by M. V. Raman.

After enjoying moderate successes in his first two films in Hindi which went unnoticed, AVM ascended the heights of Bollywood with the third one Hum Panchi Ek Daal Ke(1957). It was a children's film based on the theme of national integration and won him the prime minister's gold medal.

After the phenomenal success of Hum Panchi Ek Dal Ke, AVM produced some good films like Bhai Bhai(1956), which was popular for the song Mera Naam Abdul Rehman sung by Kishore Kumar and Miss Mary(1957), the dubbed version of the Tamil film Missiamma. Bhabhi (1957) featured Balraj Sahni, Pandari Bai and Nanda, apart from comedian Jagdeep in his first romantic role. Jagdeep also acted in other films produced by AVM as Hum Panchi Ek Dal Ke and Barkha.

The Hindi films Miss Mary, Bhakti Mahima and Bhakt Prahlad were dubbed versions of AVM's Tamil or Telugu hits.

The 1961 film Chhaya won Nirupa Roy the Filmfare Award for the Best Actress in a Supporting Role. Other notable Hindi films made by AVM during the 1960s were Man Mauji, Main Chup Rahungi, Pooja Ke Phool and Mehrban.

AVM's last Hindi film was Jeene Ki Arzoo directed by Rajasekhar in 1981.

== Family ==
Meiyappan has five sons and six daughters born to his two wives Alamelu and Rajeswari.

From Alamelu Meiyappan, who died in 1946, has 1 son and 5 daughters.

For Rajeswari Meiyappan, who died on 9 November 2008, has 1 daughter and 4 sons including M. Saravanan.

With dawn of the 1970s, production had slowed down considerably. This was due to the fact that AVM himself was aging. Moreover, the AVM family chose to focus their attention upon social activities other than filming. AVM Productions produced not more than four films during the decade: Bomma Borusa, Dil Ka Raja,Akka Thamudu and Jaise Ko Taisa. Bomma Borusa made in Telugu by K. Balachander was an average grosser as was the Hindi film Dil Ka Raja which released in 1972. Akka Thamudu directed by the successful partnership of Krishnan–Panju was AVM's last film in Telugu. It was also AVM's only Telugu film featuring Jayalalithaa. In 1973, AVM produced his last film Jaise Ko Taisa starring Jitendra in the lead role.

AVM did not produce any movies following Jeene Ki Arzoo in 1981. He spent his time on social activities and the charitable institutions he had built as well as looking after his massive business empire.

AVM died on 12 August 1979 at the age of 72. In 1980, as per AVM's last wishes, AVM Studios commenced film production under Meiyappan's sons A.V.M Kumaran and M. Saravanan, after a seven-year hiatus.

== Legacy ==
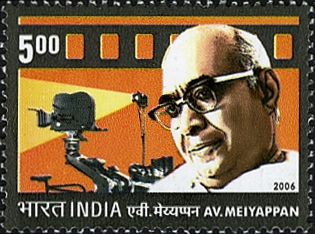
A. V. Meiyappan on a 2006 stamp of India

During a career spanning four decades, AVM had produced 167 movies in all. He also directed most of his early movies. He is credited with having introduced Kollywood's first playback singers, made India's first dubbed film and Kollywood's first film shot on location. He has also had the distinction of having had five chief ministers work in his films – C. N. Annadurai wrote the script for AVM's Ore Iravu, M. Karunanidhi scripted the dialogues for Parasakthi, M. G. Ramachandran played the hero in Anbe Vaa, J. Jayalalithaa was the heroine in AVM's Major Chandrakanth and Akka Thamudu and N. T. Rama Rao starred in AVM's Jeevitham, Ramu and Bhookailas. During his four decades in the Indian film industry, he also introduced actors as T. R. Mahalingam, Vyjayanthimala, Sivaji Ganesan, Kamal Haasan and Major Sundarrajan, who later became top stars in Kollywood. But his greatest achievement is undoubtedly his massive business empire which comprises a production company, a cinema, a movie studio and a string of educational institutions and charities.

Of AVM's creations, AVM Productions is the most prominent. The production company is into its sixty-second year with three generations of the AVM family into the film production business. After AVM's death, the company passed into the hands of his sons M. Balasubramanian and M. Saravanan. Under the able leadership of M. Saravanan, AVM Productions has continued producing hits as Punnami Naagu (launchpad for chiranjeevi as most notable actor), Murattu Kalai (which launched Rajnikanth into superstardom), Samsaram Adhu Minsaram (1986), Minsara Kanavu (1997), Gemini (2002), and Perazhagan (2004). In 2007 (which was also AVM's birth centenary year), AVM Productions released Sivaji the Boss starring Rajnikanth and Shreya. Made at enormous cost of Rs. 60 to 960 million (15 to 20 million dollars), it is the costliest Tamil film made to date and had earned a critical reception worldwide. In recent times, AVM Productions has significant lessened film production making only one or two films a year. Instead, the production house is concentrating on making tele serials and documentaries Currently, Saravanan's son M. S. Guhan and Balasubramanian's son, B. Gurunath are also into show business forming the family's third generation in the business.

In 1955, AVM won the president's gold medal for the Hindi film Hum Panchi Ek Dal Ke. In 2006, the Government of India issued a stamp commemorating the achievements of AVM. On the 24th death anniversary of Avichi Meiyappa Chettiar, in 2003, AVM Productions released a VCD on the life of its founder. Starting with his early childhood in Karaikudi, the 2-hour long documentary told the story of AVM's entry into the film industry and his rise to greatness.

On 30 July 2006, in commemoration of AVM's centenary year, the Chief Minister of Tamil Nadu, M. Karunanidhi, unveiled a statue of A. V. Meiyappan at the campus of the South Indian Film Chamber of Commerce.

== Philanthropy ==
Apart from his contributions to the growth of motion picture industry in Tamil Nadu, AVM has also donated extensively for charitable causes. The charitable activities of the AVM group were channelled through an organisation called AVM Charities established at Mylapore in Chennai. This trust has been managed by the descendants of AVM since his death in 1979. The AVM Charities had provided land for old age homes and organising social events. The AVM family also owns a marriage hall, AVM Rajeswari Kalyana Mandapam which is generally rented for Hindu marriages. This marriage hall is controlled by the AVM family through AVM Charities. Following the astounding success of the 2007 Tamil film Sivaji, AVM Productions declared publicly that it would offer 25% of the revenues from the film as charity.

The AVM Group owns a string of educational institutions all over Chennai. On 10 June 1963, AVM inaugurated Avichi High School in Virugambakkam in memory of his father Avichi Chettiar. The motive behind the founding was to provide good quality education to the poorer sections of society. Later, Avichi High School was upgraded to Avichi Higher Secondary School. A number of schools have been established since the creation of Avichi School. In 1994, AVM's son Kumaran established the Avichi High School for girls. This was followed by the establishment of AVM Rajeswari Matriculation Higher Secondary School in Virugambakkam in 1995. These schools which are run by the AVM Group as a part of AVM Charities are regarded as some of the best in Chennai.

== Awards ==
- He won Filmfare Award for Best Film - Tamil - Ramu (1966)

== See also ==
- AVM Productions
