= Vyjayanthimala filmography =

Vyjayanthimala (born 13 August 1933) is an Indian actress, Bharatanatyam dancer, Carnatic singer, dance choreographer and parliamentarian. She was the highest-paid actress of her time. Regarded as the "first female superstar" of Indian cinema, she made her debut in the Tamil language film Vaazhkai in 1949 at the age of 16 and in the Telugu language film Jeevitham in 1950. She later became one of the most prominent actresses of South Indian cinema and of the golden era of Hindi cinema and is also known as one of the most iconic leading actresses of all time. Later, Vyjayanthimala acted in the Bollywood movies Bahar and Ladki. Following the success of Nagin, Vyjayanthimala established herself as one of Bollywood's leading actresses while making inroads in successful Tamil and Telugu films. After successfully establishing herself as a commercial actress, Vyjayanthimala appeared in Devdas, playing Chandramukhi, the hooker with a heart of gold, in 1955. In her first dramatic role, she received her first Filmfare Award for Best Supporting Actress at the 4th Filmfare Awards, where she refused to accept the award citing that hers was not a supporting role, becoming the first person to refuse a Filmfare Award. Following that, Vyjayanthimala appeared in a series of blockbuster films such as New Delhi, Naya Daur and Aasha. She reached the pinnacle of her success in 1958 when two of her films — Sadhna and Madhumati — became huge critical and commercial hits. She was nominated for two Filmfare Awards for Best Actress for Sadhna and Madhumati and won the award for the former. At this point, Vyjayanthimala made a comeback to Tamil films, where she tasted commercial success with Vanjikottai Vaaliban, Irumbu Thirai, Baghdad Thirudan and Then Nilavu. In 1961, the release of Dilip Kumar's Ganga Jumna saw her playing a rustic village belle, Dhanno, who speaks the Awadhi dialect. Critics applauded her performance, while some labeled it her best to date. She won her second Filmfare Award for Best Actress for her role in Ganga Jumna. Beginning in 1962, most of her films performed either averagely or poorly at the box office. However, in 1964, with the success of Sangam, her career hit its peak again. She reinvented herself by playing a modern Indian girl appearing in revealing costumes and a one-piece swimsuit. She went on to receive her third Best Actress Award at the 12th Filmfare Awards for her role as Radha in Sangam. She later achieved critical acclaim for her performance in the historical drama Amrapali, which was based on the life of nagarvadhu Amrapali, the royal courtesan of Vaishali. The film received universal acclaim, but it was a huge box office failure, which left Vyjayanthimala, who had huge expectations of the film, disenchanted to the point where she decided to quit films. Towards the end of her career, Vyjayanthimala was mostly seen in commercially successful films such as Suraj, Jewel Thief and Prince with a few critically acclaimed films such as Hatey Bazarey and Sunghursh. Most of them were released after Vyjayanthimala left the film industry (a total of app. 65 films).

== Filmography ==
=== As an actress ===
Year	Film	Role	Language	Notes
1949	Vazhkai	Mohana Shivashankaralingam	Tamil	On-screen debut & Tamil debut
1950	Jeevitham	Mohini Sivashankara Lingeswara Prasad	Telugu	Shot simultaneously in original Tamil as Vaazhkai and also, Telugu debut
1950	Vijayakumari	Western dancer	Tamil	Guest appearance
1951	Bahar	Lata	Hindi	Bollywood film debut
1953	Ladki	Rani Mehra	Hindi	
1954	Penn	Rani	Tamil	Shot simultaneously with Ladki
1954	Sangham	Rani	Telugu	Shot simultaneously with Ladki and last Telugu film
1954	Nagin	Mala	Hindi	
1954	Pehli Jhalak	Beena	Hindi	
1954	Asha Nirasha	Asha	Kannada	Completed Unreleased
1954	Miss Mala	Mala	Hindi	
1955	Yasmin	Yasmin	Hindi	
1955	Sitara	Veda	Hindi	
1955	Jashan	Seema/Malti	Hindi	Dual Role
1955	Devdas	Chandramukhi	Hindi	Won the Filmfare Award for Best Supporting Actress, but refused the award
1956	Taj	Princess of Roopnagar	Hindi	
1956	Anjaan	Ratna	Hindi	Also known as Somewhere in Delhi
1956	New Delhi	Janki Subramaniam	Hindi	
1956	Marma Veeran	Rajkumari Vijaya	Tamil	
1956	Patrani	Princess Mrinalla	Hindi	
1956	Kismet Ka Khel	Anokhi	Hindi	
1956	Devta	Naagrani	Hindi	
1957	Naya Daur	Rajni	Hindi	
1957	Kathputli	Pushpa	Hindi	
1957	Ek Jhalak	Mala	Hindi	
1957	Aasha	Nirmala	Hindi	
1958	Sitaron Se Aagey	Kanta	Hindi	
1958	Sadhna	Rajni/Champa Bai	Hindi	Dual Role and also won the Filmfare Award for Best Actress
1958	Vanjikottai Valiban	Princess Mandakini	Tamil	
1958	Raj Tilak	Princess Mandakini	Hindi	
1958	Madhumati	Madhumati / Madhavi / Radha (Triple Role)	Hindi	Nominated-Filmfare Award for Best Actress; India's official entry to the Oscars
1958	Amar Deep	Meena/Aruna	Hindi	Dual Role
1959	Paigham	Manju	Hindi	
1959	Jawani Ki Hawa	Latha	Hindi	
1959	Athisaya Penn	Nirmala	Tamil	
1960	Raja Bakthi	Princess Mrinalini	Tamil	
1960	Parthiban Kanavu	Kundhavi	Tamil	
1960	Irumbu Thirai	Manju	Tamil	
1960	College Girl	Kamla	Hindi	
1960	Baghdad Thirudan	Zarina	Tamil	
1961	Then Nilavu	Shanthi	Tamil	
1961	Nazrana	Vasanti	Hindi	
1961	Gunga Jumna	Dhanno	Hindi	Won the Filmfare Award for Best Actress; BFJA Award for Best Actress
1961	Aas Ka Panchhi	Neena Bakshi	Hindi	
1962	Rungoli	Nirmala "Nimmo"	Hindi	
1962	Jhoola	Sumati	Hindi	
1962	Dr. Vidya	Geeta / Dr. Vidya	Hindi	
1963	Chittoor Rani Padmini	Princess Rani Padmini of Chittor	Tamil	Last Tamil film
1964	Zindagi	Beena	Hindi	
1964	Sangam	Radha	Hindi	Won the Filmfare Award for Best Actress; First technicolor film of Raj Kapoor
1964	Phoolon Ki Sej	Karuna	Hindi	
1964	Leader	Princess Sunita	Hindi	First Indian film to be shot outside of the 1.37:1 ratio (1.85:1 ratio)
1964	Ishaara	Mala	Hindi	
1965	Naya Kanoon	Jyothi	Hindi	
1966	Do Dilon Ki Dastaan		Hindi	
1966	Amrapali	Amrapali	Hindi	India's official entry to the Oscars
1966	Suraj	Princess Anuradha Singh	Hindi	
1967	Hatey Bazarey	Chhipli	Bengali	
1967	Chhoti Si Mulaqat	Roopa Chaudhary	Hindi	
1967	Jewel Thief	Shalini Devi Singh / Shalu	Hindi	
1968	Sunghursh	Munni/Laila-E-Aasmaan	Hindi	Dual Role and also won the BFJA Award for Best Actress
1968	Saathi	Shanti	Hindi	
1968	Duniya	Mala	Hindi	
1969	Pyar Hi Pyar	Kavita	Hindi	
1969	Prince	Princess Amrita	Hindi	
1970	Ganwaar	Parvati (Paro)	Hindi	Last film

=== As choreographer ===
Year	Film	Cast	Song	Language	Notes
1964	Leader	Dilip Kumar, Vyjayanthimala	Tere Husn Ki Kya Tareef Karoon Mujhe Duniya Walo Sharabi Na Samjho	Hindi	
1964	Sangam	Raj Kapoor, Vyjayanthimala, Rajendra Kumar	Main Kya Karoon Ram	Hindi	Parody of Cabaret dance

=== As producer ===
Year	Film	Cast	Language	Notes
1982	Kathoduthan Naan Pesuven	Ramji, Sripriya, Menaka	Tamil	Co-producer with Rajiyiammal; Released on 14 January 1982

=== As playback singer ===
Year	Film	Song	Co-singer(s)	Language	Notes
1967	Hatey Bazarey	Cheye Thaki Cheye Thaki	Mrinal Chakraborty	Bengali	

== See also ==
- List of awards and nominations received by Vyjayanthimala
