= List of awards and nominations received by Vyjayanthimala =

Vyjayanthimala awards and nominations
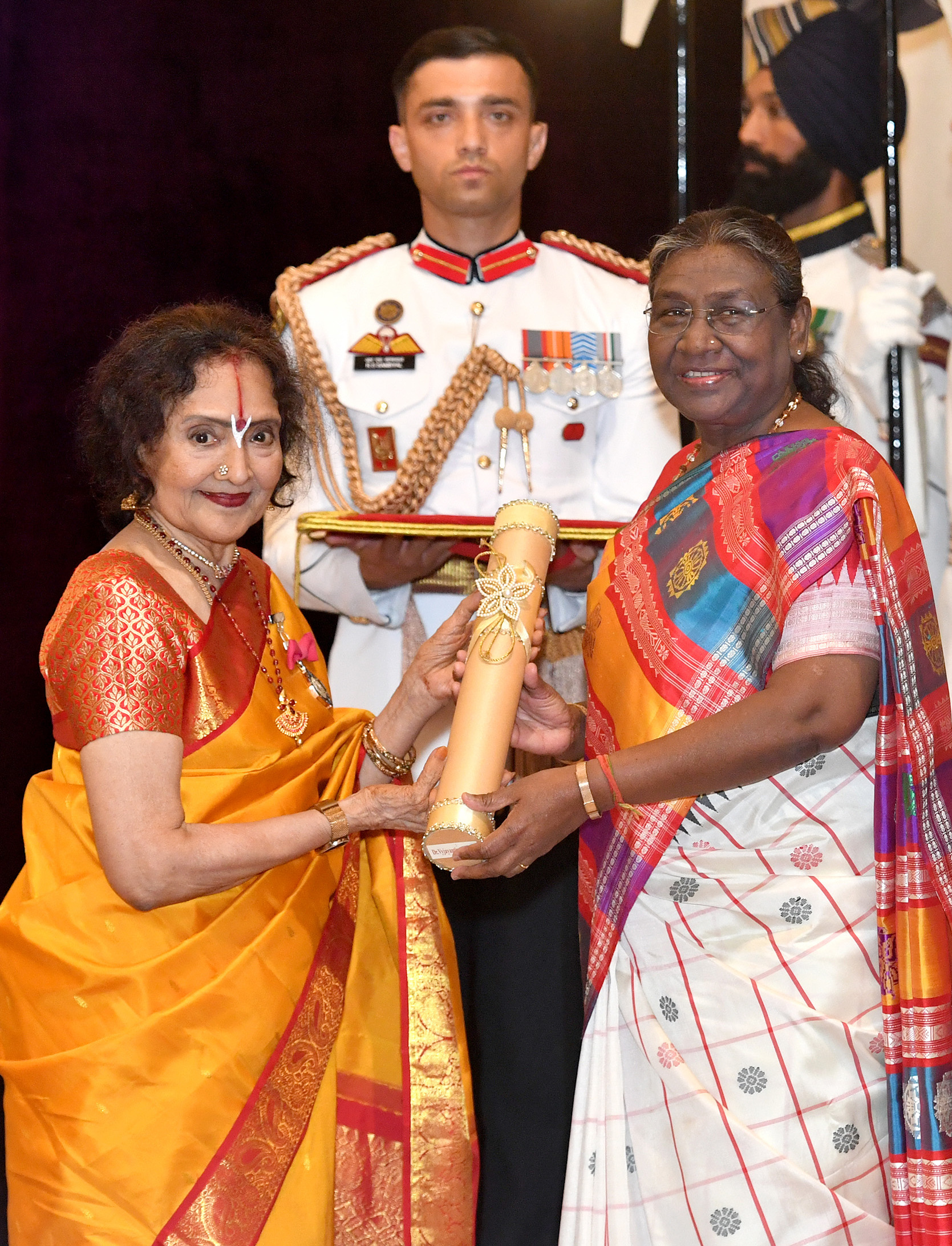
- Vyjayanthimala receiving Padma Vibhushan, c. 2024
Awards and nominations
Award	Wins	Nominations
Apsara Film & Television Producers Guild Award	1	1
Bollywood Movie Awards	1	1
Filmfare Awards	5	6
ANR National Award	1	1
BFJA Awards	2	2
FICCI Awards	1	1
Film Fans' Association Award	1	1
Kalaimamani	1	1
Kalakar Awards	1	1
Sangeet Natak Akademi Award	2	2
Stardust Award	1	1
Tamil Nadu State Film Awards	1	1

Totals (Note: Certain award groups do not simply award one winner. They acknowledge several different recipients, have runners-up, and have third place. Since this is a specific recognition and is different from losing an award, runner-up mentions are considered wins in this award tally. For simplification and to avoid errors, each award in this list has been presumed to have had a prior nomination.)
- Wins: 18
- Nominations: 19

Vyjayanthimala is a former Bollywood and Kollywood actress who also appeared in Tollywood and Bengali films. With the multilingual films Vazhkai, Jeevitham and Bahar, she was introduced into the world of cinema by A. V. Meiyappan and discovered by M. V. Raman. She achieved stardom with the blockbuster Nagin (1954). After the success of those films, her career later focused more on Hindi films where most of her films were commercially successful besides being received well by critics. She occasionally made appearances in Tamil films where she is also regarded as one of the most successful actresses. Besides her ability as an actress, she is also an accomplished dancer who introduced semi-classical dances in Bollywood films and predated the concept of item numbers. Furthermore, she was the first South Indian actress who became a national star which paved the way for other South Indian actresses to foray into Bollywood.

In addition to acting recognition, Vyjayanthimala also received some honors for her achievements in classical dancing where she is a trained Bharata Natyam dancer. Apart from acting in films she has also occasionally performed for her dance shows all over India and abroad.

== Acting awards ==
=== Apsara Film & Television Producers Guild Awards ===
The Apsara Film & Television Producers Guild Awards is presented by the Bollywood film industry to honour and recognize the professional excellence of their peers. Vyjayanthimala has received one special award for her contribution for Bollywood film industry.

Year	Award	Result	Ref.
2012	Special Award	Won	

=== Akkineni International Foundation Awards ===
The ANR National Award is an annual award, instituted in the honour of actor Akkineni Nageswara Rao, to recognize people for their lifetime achievements and contributions to the Indian film industry. Vyjayanthimala received the ANR National Award in 2008. She was selected by a jury consisting of T. Subbarami Reddy, D. Ramanaidu and Boney Kapoor. The award carries ₹ 4 lakhs in cash, memento and citation. She received the award from Y. S. Rajasekhara Reddy, the then Chief Minister of Andhra Pradesh, at an event was held at Jubilee Hills.

Year	Award	Result	Ref.
2008	ANR National Award	Won	

=== Bengal Film Journalists' Association Awards ===
The Bengal Film Journalists' Association Awards is the oldest Association of Film critics in India, founded in 1937, by the inspiration and determination of the handful of pioneers amongst the then thin section of scribes that were drawn to film journalism with a lofty mission to serve the developing film journalism and film industry. Vyjayanthimala has won two Best Actress awards in the Hindi film category.

Year	Award	Nominated work	Result	Ref.
1961	Best Actress (Hindi)	Gunga Jumna	Won	
1968	Best Actress (Hindi)	Sunghursh	Won	

=== Bollywood Movie Awards ===
The Bollywood Movie Awards was an annual film award ceremony held between 1999 and 2007 celebrating films and actors from the Bollywood film industry based in Mumbai, India. Vyjayanthimala received the lifetime achievement award in 2005 for her contribution to Hindi films.

Year	Award	Result	Ref.
2005	Lifetime Achievement Award	Won	

=== FICCI Living Legend ===
The Federation of Indian Chambers of Commerce and Industry (FICCI) funds and supports many governmental and non-governmental educational institutions across the country. Vyjayanthimala received the Living Legend Award from the federation in recognition of her outstanding contribution to the Indian entertainment industry.

Year	Award	Category	Result	Ref.
2006	Federation of Indian Chambers of Commerce and Industry	FICCI Living Legend	Won	

=== Film Fans' Association Awards ===
Vyjayanthimala won the Best Tamil Actress Award (Second Prize) at the 1st Film Fans' Association Award for her debut film Vazhkai where she secured 1,676 votes.

Year	Award	Nominated work	Result	Ref.
1950	Best Tamil Actress	Vazhkai	Runner-up	

=== Filmfare Awards ===
The Filmfare Awards are presented annually by The Times Group to honour both artistic and technical excellence of professionals in the Hindi language film industry of India. Vyjayanthimala has won four awards from five nominations, including a Lifetime Achievement Award for her contribution in Bollywood. She was the first person to decline a Filmfare Award, when she refused the Filmfare Award for Best Supporting Actress for Devdas (1955), as she stated that the roles of Chandramukhi and Paro, played by Vyjayanthimala and Suchitra Sen respectively, were parallel and of equal importance. Vyjayanthimala is the fifth most-frequent winner of the Best Actress award with three wins, behind Nutan, Kajol and Alia Bhatt with five wins, and Meena Kumari, Madhuri Dixit, Vidya Balan with four wins. She also holds the record for winning the award in any category for each year she was nominated in.

Year	Award	Nominated work	Result	Ref.
1956	Best Supporting Actress	Devdas	Won	
1958	Best Actress	Madhumati	Nominated	
1958	Best Actress	Sadhna	Won	
1961	Best Actress	Gunga Jumna	Won	
1964	Best Actress	Sangam	Won	
1996	Lifetime Achievement Award		Honoured	

=== Film festivals ===
Vyjayanthimala had been honored in various film festivals across the globe. She was awarded under the Lifetime Achievement award category.

Year	Category	Festival	Outcome	Ref.
1998	Lifetime Achievement	British Asian Film Festival	Won	
2006	Lifetime Achievement	Pune International Film Festival	Won	
2012	Lifetime Achievement	Bangalore International Film Festival	Won	

=== Kalakar Awards ===
Kalakar Awards is recognized as one of the leading awards ceremonies of East India. The brand Kalakar is all about a vision and the relentless pursuit towards its success. The ceremony was visioned by Shri Ashok Kalanauria. Vyjayanthimala has received the Lifetime Achievement Award at the 10th Kalakar Awards.

Year	Award	Result	Ref.
2002	Lifetime Achievement Award	Won	

=== Stardust Awards ===
The Stardust Awards are presented by Stardust magazine. They are presented annually to honour professional excellence in the Hindi language film industry of India. Vyjayanthimala was honored with the "Pride of Film Industry Award" for her contribution to Hindi cinema.

Year	Award	Result	Ref.
2013	Pride of Film Industry Award	Won	

=== Tamil Nadu State Film Awards ===
Tamil Nadu State Film Awards are the most notable film awards given for Tamil films in India. They are given annually to honour the best talents and provide encouragement and incentive to the South Indian film industry by the Government of Tamil Nadu. The awards are decided by a committee headed by a jury. Vyjayanthimala was bestowed with the Thyagaraja Bhagavathar Award for her contribution in Tamil cinema. The award was instituted in the honour of actor M. K. Thyagaraja Bhagavathar.

Year	Award	Result	Ref.
2001	Thyagaraja Bhagavathar Award	Won	

=== Anandalok Pusarkar Awards ===
Anandalok Puraskar ceremony is an award ceremony for Bengali film in India. The Anandalok, only film magazine in Bengali language, published from Ananda Publishers and Ananda Bazar Patrika presents this award (Puraskar). The magazine was started on 25 January 1975 and the awards ceremony was started in 1998. Vyjayanthimala was honored with the Lifetime Achievement Award, which was handed over by Prosenjit Chatterjee

Year	Award	Results	Ref.
2022	Anandalok Puraskar	Won	

== Classical dance ==
- 1973 – Arasavai Natya Kalaingnar from Government of Tamil Nadu for excellence in Bharatanatyam
- 1982 – Sangeet Natak Akademi Award for Lifetime achievement in Bharatanatyam
- 1998 – Nadabrahmam Award from Narada Gana Sabha
- 1999 – TTK memorial award from Madras Music Academy
- 2002 – Nrithya Rathnakara Award by Bhairavi Fine Arts Society during Cleveland Thyagaraja Aradhana at Cleveland, Ohio, United States
- 2005 – Sanskriti Kalashree Award from Sanskriti Organization
- 2005 – Lifetime Achievement Award from The Rotary Club of Chennai, Kilpauk, Chennai
- 2006 – Gnana Kala Bharathi award from Bharat Kalachar for achievement in Bharata Natyam
- 2007 – Kalaratna Mala Award at 38th annual Bhajan Samaroh
- 2009 – Yagnaraman Lifetime Achievement Award
- 2009 – Natyakala Tapaswini award from Sri Ramakrishna Alva Memorial
- 2010 – Bharatha Kalai Arasi award from Sri Madhavi Natyalaya Institute
- 2010 – E. Krishna Iyer Medal from Sruti Foundation for her outstanding contributions to Bharatanatyam in a distinguished career spread over seven decades
- 2011 – Naatya Padhmam award from Brahma Gana Sabha
- 2011 – Natya Kala Shikamani award from All India Fine Arts and Crafts Society and Apollo Hospitals
- 2011 – Shanmukhananda National Eminence Award from Shanmukhananda Hall
- 2011 – Vocational Service Awards Lifetime Achievement for Bharatanatyam from Rotary Club of Chennai Towers
- 2011 – Lifetime Achievement Award from Kartik Fine Arts
- 2012 – Sangeet Natak Akademi Tagore Ratna as a part of the ongoing commemoration of the 150th Birth Anniversary of Gurudev Rabindranath Tagore for her significant contribution in the field of performing arts

== National and international honors ==
- 1968 – Padma Shri from the Government of India
- 1979 – Tamil Nadu State Artist Award from the Government of Tamil Nadu by M. G. Ramachandran
- 1979 – Received title of Kalaimamani Award by the Government of Tamil Nadu, which is the highest state honour in the field of Arts
- 1995 – Honorary doctorate from Annamalai University
- 2001 – The Federation of Indo-American Associations of North California invited her to be grand marshal for auspices of the Indian Independence Day on August 12 and 13 of 2001.
- 2001 – Lifetime achievement from The Federation of Indo-American Associations of North California at Silicon Valley
- 2003 – Lifetime achievement from Amir Khusro Sangeet Academy for contribution to the arts
- 2004 – Legend of Indian Cinema Award at Atlantic City, United States
- 2005 – Bangalore Gayana Samaja Centenary Award by Government of Karnataka
- 2006 – Sivaji Ganesan Award by Sivaji Prabhu charity trust
- 2007 – Ambassador for Peace Award from Universal Peace Federation
- 2008 – Honored by Mayor of St. Louis for her contribution to art
- 2008 – Sivaji Ganesan Awards of Excellence
- 2009 – ANR National Award
- 2010 – Rajinikanth Legend Award for excellence in cinema under Bhishma category by The Ashram
- 2010 – National Integration Award from T. Subbarami Reddy Kalapeetham Awards
- 2011 – Honored by the Government of France for visiting France during the filming of Sangam
- 2011 – B. Sarojadevi National Award
- 2024 – Padma Vibhushan from the Government of India

== See also ==
- Vyjayanthimala
- Vyjayanthimala filmography

Awards
Filmfare Awards
Preceded by Nirupa Roy for Munimji	Best Supporting Actress for Devdas; 1956	Succeeded by Shyama for Sharada
Preceded by Nargis for Mother India	Best Actress for Sadhna; 1958	Succeeded by Nutan for Sujata
Preceded by Bina Rai for Ghunghat	Best Actress for Gunga Jumna; 1961	Succeeded by Meena Kumari for Sahib Bibi Aur Ghulam
Preceded by Nutan for Bandini	Best Actress for Sangam; 1964	Succeeded by Meena Kumari for Kaajal
Preceded by Shammi Kapoor and Waheeda Rehman	Lifetime Achievement; 1995; With: Ashok Kumar and Sunil Dutt	Succeeded by Dharmendra, Mumtaz and Pran
