= Ladki =

1953 film

- Poster
- Directed by: M. V. Raman
- Written by: Rajendra Krishan
- Story by: R. Venkatachalam
- Produced by: A. V. Meiyappan
- Starring: Bharat Bhushan; Kishore Kumar; Vyjayanthimala; Anjali Devi
- Cinematography: T. Muthusami; Yusuf Mulji
- Edited by: M. V. Raman; K. Shankar
- Music by: R. Sudarsanam; Dhaniram
- Production company: AVM Productions
- Release date: 13 November 1953
- Running time: 160 minutes
- Country: India
- Language: Hindi
- Budget: ₹70,00,000
- Box office: ₹1,50,00,000

Ladki (transl. Girl) is a 1953 Indian Hindi-language romantic comedy film written by V. S. Venkatasalam and directed by M. V. Raman. The film stars Bharat Bhushan, Kishore Kumar, Vyjayanthimala, and Anjali Devi in lead roles, along with Om Prakash, Leela Mishra, Raj Mehra, and Chittor V. Nagaiah in supporting roles. The film was produced by A. V. Meiyappan of AVM Productions. The film's score was composed by R. Sudarsanam and Dhaniram, edited by K. Shankar and M. V. Raman, and filmed by Yusuf Mulji and T. Muthu Sami.

== Plot ==
Rani, a feminist, is best friends with Kamini, much to the disapproval of her mother, since Kamini's father had married a woman of low caste. They meet Raja, a medical student, and Kishore. After the initial tussle, Raja and Kamini fall in love while Kishore likes Rani. Rani goes to Colombo for the University Sports Tournament, and while winning every single event she enters there, she injures her leg and is in hospital. Meanwhile, Kamini and Raja marry secretly, since he knows his misogynistic, upper caste father will never agree to this marriage. Captain Sundar, Kamini's childhood friend, comes from Rangoon and wants to marry Kamini, but is shattered as he finds out she is married to Raja. Raja's parents are told of the wedding and they call him home asking him to forget the marriage and marry a girl of their choice. Raja refuses and goes back to Kamini and misunderstands the situation when he sees Kamini with Sundar. He returns to his parents and tells them he's willing to marry the girl of their liking who turns out to be Rani, having returned from Colombo. Kamini, devastated by Raja's betrayal, decides to commit suicide. Finally with Kishore and Sundar's help, everything is sorted out and Raja is re-united with Kamini, while Kishore marries Rani.

== Cast ==
- Bharat Bhushan as Raja
- Kishore Kumar as Kishore
- Vyjayanthimala as Rani
- Anjali Devi as Kamini
- Om Prakash as Hazurdas
- Leela Mishra as Mrs. Hazurdas
- Raj Mehra as Rani's Father
- Chittor V. Nagaiah as Motilal
- Randhir as Nainsukh

== Production ==
Ladki was produced by A. V. Meiyappan, founder of AVM Productions. It was simultaneously shot in Tamil as Penn and Telugu as Sangham, with Vyjayanthimala starring as the female lead along with Anjali Devi as the second female lead in all three versions.

== Soundtrack ==
The film's soundtrack was composed by R. Sudarsanam and Dhaniram, while the lyrics were provided by Rajendra Krishan.

The song "Shaadi Shaadi Shaadi" sung by Kishore Kumar and "Baat Chalat Nai Chunari Rang Dari" sung by Geeta Dutt became the successful songs of the film.

Song	Singer
"Kismet Ki Baat Maalik Ke Haath Jeevan Ka Saath Hai Shaadi Shaadi Shaadi"	Kishore Kumar
"Aurat Na Ho To Zindagi Kis Kaudi Kaam Ki"	Kishore Kumar, C. Ramchandra
"Main Hoon Bharat Ki"	Lata Mangeshkar
"Mere Watan Se Achha"	Lata Mangeshkar
"Todke Duniya Ki Deewar"	Lata Mangeshkar
"Sajna Aaja, Daras Dikhaja"	Lata Mangeshkar
"Man Mor Machave Shor, Ghata Ghanghor Chhayi"	Lata Mangeshkar, Geeta Dutt
"Baat Chalat Nai Chunari"	Geeta Dutt
"Chheen Le Khushiyan"	Geeta Dutt
"Ae Aankh Roke Likh De"	Geeta Dutt
"Naari Se Naagan Bhali"	Om Prakash
"Gopal Krishna Radhe"	Om Prakash
"Insan Jo Rota Hai"	Krishna Goel

== Reception ==
Upperstall's reviewer Karan Bali wrote: "As with Bahar and many of her early films, it is Vyjayanthimala's dances that are the film's saving graces although it is unintentionally funny now to see how deliberate and obviously tacky the sequences are which lead into her dances [...] Ladki too makes no real demands on 'feminist' tomboy Vyjayanthimala histrionically [...] Kishore Kumar are strictly supportive appendages at best [...] Kishore Kumar does what he can, bringing the film to life with his lively antics whenever he is on screen. One sees his potential for zany comedy that would go on to flower fully in films like Aasha (1957), Chalti Ka Naam Gaadi (1958) and Half Ticket (1962)".

== Box office ==
At the end of its theatrical run, the film grossed around ₹1,50,00,000, and became the second highest-grossing film of 1953 with a verdict of "hit".
