= Pehli Jhalak =

- Directed by: M. V. Raman
- Starring: Kishore Kumar; Vyjayanthimala; Pran
- Music by: C. Ramchandra
- Production company: Jagat Pictures
- Release date: 1954
- Country: India
- Language: Hindi

Pehli Jhalak is a 1954 Indian Hindi-language film directed by M. V. Raman. The film starred Kishore Kumar, Vyjayanthimala and Pran, and marked the acting debut of Dara Singh. Its soundtrack was composed by C. Ramchandra. The story follows a young woman who leaves home to escape an arranged marriage and falls in love with a small-time thief.

Pehli Jhalak premiered in Bombay on 19 November 1954 and had a wider theatrical release in early 1955. A critic for The Times of India found it to be a "poor repetition of Bahar formula". Shankar's Weekly described it as one of the biggest box office hits of the year.

The film's success, alongside Kumar's other releases of this period, helped establish him as a leading actor of Hindi cinema. A Filmfare review commended his acting performance:

"In a vaguely defined role as Vyjayantimala's lover, Kishore Kumar puts across a decidedly brave performance. Through the sheer force of his own personality, he surmounts the limitation set by the director."

== Cast ==
- Kishore Kumar
- Vyjayanthimala
- Om Prakash
- Dara Singh
- Shammi
- Kamal Kant
- Roopa Varman
- Anil
- Jawahar Kaul
- Shivraj
- Pran
