= ANR National Award =

Indian film award

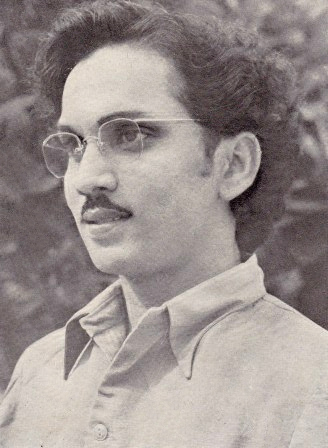
- Akkineni Nageswara Rao
- Awarded for: Lifetime achievement and contribution to the Indian cinema
- Country: India
- Presented by: Akkineni International Foundation
- First award: 2005
- Final award: 2024
- Website: Official website

The ANR National Award is instituted by the Akkineni International Foundation in the honor of Akkineni Nageswara Rao. The award was given annually to recognize people for their lifetime achievements and contributions to the Indian film industry. ANR National Award was first awarded to actor Dev Anand in 2005.

== List of recipients ==
Year	Presented date	Recipient	Notes
2005	2006	Dev Anand	
2006	13 January 2007	Shabana Azmi	
2007	13 January 2008	Anjali Devi	
2008	10 January 2009	Vyjayanthimala	
2009		Lata Mangeshkar	
2010	11 January 2011	K. Balachander	
2011	26 December 2011	Hema Malini	
2012	27 January 2013	Shyam Benegal	
2014	27 December 2014	Amitabh Bachchan	
2017	17 September 2017	S. S. Rajamouli	
2018	17 November 2019	Sridevi (Note: The award was posthumously given in November 2019 alongside Rekha. It was received by her husband Boney Kapoor.)	
2019	17 November 2019	Rekha	
2024	28 October 2024	Chiranjeevi	

== See also ==
- Dadasaheb Phalke Award
- NTR National Award
