= Yasmin (1955 film) =

1955 Indian film

- Directed by: Abdur Rashid Kardar
- Written by: Story: Abdur Rashid Kardar; Dialogue: Jagdish Kanwal & S. N. Banerjee
- Produced by: Abdur Rashid Kardar
- Starring: Vyjayanthimala; Suresh; Jayant
- Cinematography: Dwarka Divecha
- Edited by: M. S. Hajee
- Music by: C. Ramchandra
- Production company: Kardar Studio
- Distributed by: Musical Pictures
- Release date: 1955
- Country: India
- Language: Hindi

Yasmin (Hindi: यास्मिन) is a 1955 Hindi Black-and-white Costume drama, written, produced and directed by Abdur Rashid Kardar.

The film starred Vyjayanthimala in the title role, with Suresh in the lead, while Jayant, Rashid Khan, Maruti Rao, S. N. Banerjee, Shyam Kumar and Rajan Haksar form an ensemble cast. The film was produced at Kardar Studio. The film's score was composed by C. Ramchandra, with lyrics provided by Jan Nisar Akhtar.

== Plot ==
The story is about Ahmad, who is in love with Yasmin. A powerful and princely Sheikh living in 18th Century Persia makes a living renting out properties and recovering taxes and dues on them. He lives in a palatial house with his wife, Zubeda, and son, Ahmad. When Ahmad grows up, Zubeda notices that he spends too much time with women in their harem, and urges his father to get him involved in their business. Sheikh accordingly instructs Ahmad to collect all revenue, which he does so. A few days later, Sheikh is informed that Ahmad has been spending time with a friend named Farid, and is romantically involved with a dancing girl named Yasmin. A visibly upset Sheikh accordingly warns Ahmad to mend his ways, give up on Yasmin, and return home where he has planned his marriage with Nadira, the daughter of Amir Qasim. Ahmad does return home but refuses to marry Nadira, and runs away to be close to Yasmin, knowing fully well that Yasmin is connected with a group of gypsy thugs who use her charms to lure wealthy young men to extract a ransom. Ahmad also knows that his enraged father will challenge him to a duel - a duel unto death - that will ensure a death in his family.

== Cast ==
- Vyjayanthimala as Yasmin
- Suresh as Ahmed
- Jayant as Sheikh
- Rashid Khan as Ehsaan
- Mumtaz Begum as Zubeda Sheikh
- Mumtaz as Child

== Soundtrack ==
The music was composed by C. Ramchandra, with the lyrics penned by Jan Nisar Akhtar.

Song	Singer
"Aankhon Mein Sama Jao, Iss Dil Mein Raha"	Lata Mangeshkar
"Aaja Aaja Mere Saqi"	Lata Mangeshkar
"Ab Woh Raaten Kahan"	Lata Mangeshkar
"Bechain Karnewale"	Lata Mangeshkar
"Dil Unko Dhundta Hai, Hum Dil Ko Dhundatein Hain"	Lata Mangeshkar
"Hans Hanske Haseenon Se"	Lata Mangeshkar
"Mohabbat Mein Pehla Kadam Rakhne Waalo"	Lata Mangeshkar
"Mujhpe Ilzam-E-Bewafai Hai"	Lata Mangeshkar
"Tum Apni Yaad Bhi Dil Se Bhula Jate To Achha Tha"	Lata Mangeshkar, Talat Mahmood
"Bechain Nazar, Betab Jigar, Yeh Dil Hai Kisi Ka Diwana"	Talat Mahmood

== Awards ==
Filmfare Awards

- Filmfare Award for Best Cinematographer (B&W category) - Dwarka Divecha
