= Kathputli (1957 film) =

- Directed by: Amiya Chakrabarty; Nitin Bose
- Written by: Chandrakant Gaur
- Screenplay by: Amiya Chakrabarty
- Story by: Amiya Chakrabarty
- Produced by: Amiya Chakrabarty; Ajit Chakraborty
- Starring: Vyjayanthimala; Balraj Sahni; Jawahar Kaul; Agha
- Cinematography: V. Babasaheb
- Edited by: C. Ramarao
- Music by: Shankar Jaikishan
- Production company: Sreerangam Production
- Distributed by: Sreerangam Production
- Release date: 1 January 1957
- Country: India
- Language: Hindi/Urdu

Kathputli (transl. Puppet) is a 1957 Pygmalion Black-and-white Hindi-language film produced by Ajit Chakraborty and Amiya Chakrabarty with their Sreerangam Productions. The film was the last film of director Amiya Chakrabarty, who had earlier directed Basant, Daag and Seema. He died during the filming and Nitin Bose took up the mantle of director in the film. The film stars Vyjayanthimala and Balraj Sahni in the lead with Jawahar Kaul, Agha, Kumari Kamala, C. S. Dubey, Sheela Kashmiri, Poonam and Laxman Rao, forming an ensemble cast. The film's music was composed by the Shankar Jaikishan duo, with the lyrics by Shailendra and Hasrat Jaipuri.

== Plot ==
The film's story is about young Pushpa, an accomplished dancer and singer, who assists puppeteer Shivraj in his puppet show. Pushpa comes from a poor family, and is a good dancer and singer. She would like to assist a puppeteer with his makeshift dolls and puppet act. Unfortunately, he meets with an accident, and is hospitalized. Some of his puppets were also damaged during this accident. Pushpa approaches Loknath for work, and he gets her to work on stage, and would like her to become a movie star. Will Pushpa give up her simple life, and take on the glamorous route? It dealt with the theme of a godfather trying to control his protégé.

== Cast ==
- Vyjayanthimala as Pushpa
- Balraj Sahni as Loknath
- Kamala Laxman as Kamala
- Jawahar Kaul as Shivraj
- Sheela Kashmiri as Chandni, Pushpa's younger sister
- C. S. Dube
- Laxman Rao
- Jharna
- Punam
- Jagat Pal
- Shyam Kumar
- Robert
- Vijay
- Agha as Manohar

== Soundtrack ==
Kathputli

Soundtrack album by Shankar Jaikishan
- Released: 1957
- Recorded: Minoo Katrak
- Genre: Film soundtrack
- Label: The Gramophone Company of India
- Producer: Shankar Jaikishan

Shankar Jaikishan chronology
Basant Bahar (1956)	Kathputli (1957)	Yahudi (1958)

The film's soundtrack was composed by the Shankar Jaikishan duo, with the lyrics by Shailendra and Hasrat Jaipuri. The soundtrack was a hit among the audience.

No.	Song	Singers	Picturization	Length (m:ss)	Lyrics	Notes
1	"Bakkad Bam Bam"	Lata Mangeshkar	Featuring actress Vyjayanthimala performing folk dances such as Mayilattam and Koothu	04:02	Hasrat Jaipuri	
2	"Bol Ri Kath Putli"	Lata Mangeshkar	Featuring Vyjayanthimala performing a street dance	06:07	Shailendra	
3	"Bol Ri Kath Putli"	Lata Mangeshkar	Featuring Vyjayanthimala performing Kathakali and other forms of dance	06:07	Shailendra	Sad version
4	"Manzil Wohi Hai Pyar Ki"	Subir Sen	Featuring Vyjayanthimala and Balraj Sahni	03:57	Shailendra	
5	"Mini Mini Chichi"	Lata Mangeshkar, Mukesh	Stage duet on actress Vyjayanthimala and Agha	04:15	Shailendra	
6	"Haye Tu Hi Gaya Mohe Bhool Re"	Lata Mangeshkar	Featuring actress Kumari Kamala	05:07	Shailendra	
7	"Itne Bade Jahan Mein Ae Dil"	Lata Mangeshkar	Stage dance by Vyjayanthimala	06:19	Shailendra	
7	"So Ja Re So Ja"	Lata Mangeshkar	Featuring actress Vyjayanthimala	04:05	Hasrat Jaipuri	
