= Sangham (1954 film) =

- Theatrical release poster
- Directed by: M. V. Raman
- Written by: Tholeti (dialogues)
- Screenplay by: M. V. Raman
- Story by: V. S. Venkatachalam
- Produced by: M. Murugan; M. Saravanan; M. Kumaran
- Starring: Vyjayanthimala; Anjali Devi; N. T. Rama Rao; S. Balachander
- Cinematography: T. Muthu Swamy
- Edited by: M. V. Raman; K. Shankar
- Music by: R. Sudarsanam
- Production company: AVM Productions
- Release date: 10 July 1954
- Running time: 175 minutes
- Country: India
- Language: Telugu

Sangham (transl. Society) is a 1954 Indian Telugu-language romantic comedy film, produced by M. Murugan, M. Saravanan and M. Kumaran of AVM Productions and written and directed by M. V. Raman. It stars Vyjayanthimala, Anjali Devi, N. T. Rama Rao and S. Balachander, with music composed by R. Sudarsanam.

== Cast ==
- Vyjayanthimala as Rani
- Anjali Devi as Kamini
- N. T. Rama Rao as Raja
- S. Balachander as Chandram
- S. V. Ranga Rao as Seetharamanjaneya Das
- V. Nagayya as Ramanatham
- Ramana Reddy as Yeka Kannaiah
- S. V. Sahasranamam as Sundaram
- R. Balasubramaniam as Colonel Mallikarjuna Rao
- Rushyendramani as Abbayamma
- Hemalatha Tammarapi as Rani's mother

== Production ==
Sangham was produced by A. V. Meiyappan, the founder of AVM Productions. It was simultaneously shot in Hindi as Ladki and in Tamil as Penn. Vyjayanthimala appeared as the female lead in all three versions. N. T. Rama Rao was cast in the role done by Bharat Bhushan in the Hindi version and Gemini Ganesan in the Tamil version.

== Soundtrack ==
Music composed by R. Sudarsanam. Lyrics were written by Tholeti.

Song title	Singers	length
"Bharata Veera"	P. Susheela	2:38
"Aadadante Aluseladela"	Raghunath Panigrahi	2:02
"Jaathi Bedam Samasipoda"	V. Nagayya	2:16
"Sundaranga"	P. Susheela & T. S. Bagavathi	4:14
"Nidurinchedi"	Madhavapeddi Satyam	3:53
"Karavalamani"	P. Susheela, T. S. Bagavathi & M. S. Rajeswari	8:22
"Ilalo Sati Leni"	P. Susheela	7:12
"Pelli Pelli"	Pithapuram	3:03
"Nalugurilo"	T. S. Bagavathi	4:22
"Dimikita Dimikita"	Madhavapeddi Satyam	4:30
"Kohi Kohi Mani Kakula"	P. Susheela	3:53
"Aasale Adiasalai"	P. Susheela	3:25

== Box office ==
The film became hit at the box office due to the Vyjayanthimala fan craze.
