= Patrani =

- Directed by: Vijay Bhatt
- Written by: R. S. Choudhury
- Produced by: Shankerbhai Bhatt
- Starring: Vyjayanthimala; Pradeep Kumar; Shashikala
- Cinematography: Bipin Gajjar
- Edited by: Pratap Dave
- Music by: Shankar Jaikishan
- Production company: Shri Prakash Pictures
- Release date: 1956
- Country: India
- Language: Hindi

Patrani (Hindi: पटरानी; transl. Chief Queen) is a 1956 Hindi black and white historical drama written by R. S. Choudhury and directed by Vijay Bhatt. The film starred Vyjayanthimala and Pradeep Kumar, with Shashikala, Durga Khote, Om Prakash, Jeevan, David Abraham Cheulkar, Leela Mishra, Kanchanamala, Praveen Paul, Ramesh Sinha, Gadadhar Sharma, Maya, Krishnakant, Helen and Sheila Vaz, forming an ensemble cast. The film was produced by Shankerbhai Bhatt. The film's score was composed by Shankar Jaikishan duo with lyrics provided by Shailendra and Hasrat Jaipuri. Editing was done by Shivaji Awdhut and filming was done by K. H. Kapadia. The story revolves around the king, Karma Dev, and his attitude.

== Plot ==
The story is about King Karma Dev who gives a lot of importance to physical beauty. His mother, the Rajmata requests Mahamantri Munjal to find him a nice wife. Karma Dev often dreams of marrying an unknown beautiful woman he had once seen in the Somnath temple. Meanwhile, Mrinalla is the princess of Karnataka, who also dreams of marrying a king she had once seen in the Somnath temple. When Munjal happens to see the beautiful woman Mrinalla, he shows the King's portrait to her. She is happy to finally find the man of her dreams and runs away from the palace to search for Karma Dev to marry him. Soon after, Munjal shows Mrinalla's painting to Karma Dev, who agrees to marry her. On the day of the marriage, the King finds out she is dark and refuses to marry her. After several incidents, Karma Dev realizes his mistake and at last, he happily accepts Mrinalla as his Patrani.

== Cast ==
- Vyjayanthimala as Princess Mrinalla
- Pradeep Kumar as King Karma Dev
- Shashikala as Namunjala
- Durga Khote as Raj Mata
- Om Prakash as Vichitram
- Jeevan as Uday Mantri
- David Abraham Cheulkar as Munjal Mehta
- Leela Mishra as Munjal's Wife
- Kanchanamala
- Praveen Paul as Karnatak Queen
- Ramesh Sinha as King Jai Keshi
- Gadadhar Sharma as Raj Jyotishi
- Maya as Queen
- Krishnakant as Ghunghru Mahraj
- Sheila Vaz
- Helen in Guest appearance
- Minoo Katrak in Guest appearance

== Casting ==
The role of Namunjala was first offered to actress Shyama, but she refused the role, which later went to actress Shashikala. From 4 a.m. to 8 a.m. and then again from 6 p.m. to 8 p.m., Shashikala practised her dance rehearsal with choreographer Hiralal, in order to match actress Vyjayanthimala step for step in a dance competition that featured in the film.

== Soundtrack ==
The film's soundtrack was composed by Shankar Jaikishan and the lyrics were penned by Shailendra and Hasrat Jaipuri.

No.	Song	Singers	Lyrics	Length (m:ss)	Notes
1	"Saat Samundar Paar"	Lata Mangeshkar	Hasrat Jaipuri	3:36	Featuring actress Vyjayanthimala
2	"O Balam Tum Bedardi"	Lata Mangeshkar	Shailendra	3:43	
3	"Chandrama Kyon Jhoome"	Lata Mangeshkar	Shailendra	6:04	
4	"Dil Gaya Dard Raha Seene Mein"	Lata Mangeshkar	Shailendra	4:40	
5	"Are Koi Jao Ri Piya Ko Bulao Ri"	Lata Mangeshkar, Meena Mangeshkar, Usha Mangeshkar	Shailendra	3:57	
6	"Raja Pyare Mat Karo Pyar Ka Mol"	Lata Mangeshkar, Usha Mangeshkar	Shailendra	2:87	
7	"Na Jane Tum Kaun Meri Ankhon Men"	Lata Mangeshkar	Shailendra	4:15	
