= College Girl (1960 film) =

1960 film

- Directed by: T. Prakash Rao
- Written by: K. A. Narayan (story & screenplay); Vrajendra Gaur (dialogue)
- Produced by: B. L. Rawal
- Starring: Shammi Kapoor; Vyjayanthimala
- Cinematography: Dharam Chopra
- Edited by: Pran Mehra
- Music by: Shankar-Jaikishan
- Production company: Rawal Films
- Release date: 1960
- Country: India
- Language: Hindi
- Box office: ₹70,00,000

College Girl is a 1960 Hindi black-and-white romantic family film written by K. A. Narayan and directed by T. Prakash Rao. The film starred Shammi Kapoor, Vyjayanthimala in the lead with Om Prakash, Tabassum, Nana Palsikar, Raj Mehra, Purnima, Randhir, Achala Sachdev, Leela Mishra, Mohan Choti forming an ensemble cast. The film was produced by B. L. Rawal under his own banner, Rawal Films. The film's score was composed by duo Shankar-Jaikishan with lyrics provided by Rajendra Krishan, edited by Pran Mehra and was filmed by Dharam Chopra.

== Plot ==
In India, girls from their very birth are taken as a liability upon their parents; thus the mothers of the nation are looked down upon in their own homes. Kamla represents such afflicted Indian girlhood. She is the daughter of Judge Ram Pershad who is illiterate and has orthodox views about girls. She stands first in the Matriculation Examination and has an ardent desire to study in college in order to become a doctor. Judge Ram Pershad is totally against college education for girls. He believes that only money spent on the sons is money well-spent because they are sons and will stand by him in his old age. Kamla is determined not to bow before injustice, but to secure her rightful place in society. She makes an all-out bid to join college with the contrivance of Dr. Ratanlal, a close friend of her father. In college, she comes across Shyam, who helps her in many difficult situations.

== Cast ==
- Shammi Kapoor as Shyam
- Vyjayanthimala as Kamla
- Om Prakash as Hakim Ram Prasad
- Nana Palsikar as Biharilal
- Tabassum as Biharilal's Wife
- Raj Mehra as Ratan
- Purnima as Janki
- Randhir as Kamla's Neighbour
- Achala Sachdev as Shyam's Mother
- Leela Mishra as Ramprasad's Sister
- Mohan Choti as Shyam's Friend

== Production ==
The film marks the debut of Saroj Khan as the choreographer, she trained actress Vyjayanthimala. After the death of actor Shammi Kapoor in 2011, The Hindu interviewed actress Vyjayanthimala in conjunction with a tribute to actor Shammi Kapoor, she described the actor as "Whilst working in "College Girl", he adopted a peculiar way of walking on his toes, which he effectively created himself".

== Soundtrack ==
Song	Singer
"Babul Hum Tore Angna Ki"	Lata Mangeshkar
"Pehla Pehla Pyar Ka Ishaara Kaho Ji Dekha Hai Kabhi"	Lata Mangeshkar, Mohammed Rafi
"Hum Aur Tum Aur Yeh Sama Lovely Lovely Lovely"	Lata Mangeshkar, Mohammed Rafi
"Hum Bhi Karte Hai Pyar, Samajh Mein Aaya"	Lata Mangeshkar, Mohammed Rafi
"Yeh College Ka Zamana, Yeh Hansna Hansana"	Lata Mangeshkar, Mohammed Rafi
"Yeh Jhuth Hai Sarasar"	Mohammed Rafi
"Hip Hip Hurrah"	Mohammed Rafi

== Box office ==
At the end of its theatrical run, the film grossed around ₹70,00,000 with net collection of ₹35,00,000, thus becoming the eighteenth highest-grossing film of 1960. Box Office India gave it a verdict of "average".
