= Penn (film) =

- Theatrical release poster
- Directed by: M. V. Raman
- Written by: Ra. Venkatachalam
- Produced by: A. V. Meiyappan
- Starring: Vyjayanthimala; Anjali Devi; Gemini Ganesan; S. Balachander
- Cinematography: T. Muthusami
- Edited by: M. V. Raman; K. Shankar
- Music by: R.Sudharsanam
- Production company: AVM Productions
- Release date: 25 June 1954
- Country: India
- Language: Tamil

Penn (transl. Girl) is a 1954 Indian Tamil-language romantic comedy film written by Ra. Venkatachalam and directed by M. V. Raman. It stars Vyjayanthimala, Anjali Devi, Gemini Ganesan, and S. Balachander while V. Nagayya, V. K. Ramasamy, K. N. Kamlam, K. R. Chellam and K. Sankarapani feature as the ensemble cast. The film was produced by A. V. Chettiar of AVM Productions. The score was composed by R. Sudharsanam with the lyrics by Papanasam Sivan and Udumalai Narayana Kavi, Ku. Sa. Krishnamurthy, K. P. Kamakshi and V. Seetharaman. Editing was done by K. Shankar and M. V. Raman while the camera was handled by T. Muthu Sami.

== Plot ==
Rani (Vyjayanthimala), a brave and outspoken feminist, lives in Bangalore with her open-minded father, a colonel, and her conservative mother, who disapproves of Rani's friendship with a mixed-caste girl named Kanmani (Anjali Devi). She is deeply protective of her best friend Kanmani, who is shy and modest, a polar opposite of Rani in many ways. Kanmani lives with her single father Ramanathan Pillai (Nagayya), who faces social trouble for having married a woman of lower caste, Kanmani's deceased mother Annapurani. This stigma also makes it hard for him to find a suitor for Kanmani. He mourns the loss of his wife, who has promised her brother Sundaram (Sahasranamam) Kanmani's hand in marriage. Ramanathan is also distressed as his attempts at finding Sundaram's whereabouts all resulted in failure.

Raja (Gemini Ganesan), a forward-thinker is introduced along with his carefree and cheerful friend Raghu (Balachander). Raja's father, Sarangapani Pillai (Sarangapani) is an hateful misogynist, who spreads his regressive mindset to the men around him.

Raja and Raghu then set off for medical college together. By chance, they meet Rani and Kanmani while driving one day, down a country road. Raja instantly falls for Kanmani's looks. The pair meet again at a park. By now, Raja had completely grown fond of Kanmani while Raghu likes Rani. Around this time, Rani leaves for Colombo to take part in International sports championships, where she wins at almost every competition but unfortunately fractures her leg in the cycle race. She is advised bed rest for a few months to aid her recovery. On learning of this news, a distressed Kanmani injures herself, toppling down the stairs, but Raja arrives in time to help her. Kanmani eventually reciprocates the love and they marry without the knowledge of Raja's parents.

Meanwhile, Sundaram, who was away in Burma working for the cause of India's independence, returns to his native wishing to marry Kanmani. He is disheartened upon learning of her marriage but stays as a guest for few days at Kanmani's place. At the same time, Raja's parents learn of his marriage through a vengeful old man, who was previously rejected as Kanmani's suitor. A furious Sarangapani writes demanding Raja's return. Upon his arrival, Raja is persuaded by his parents to abandon Kanmani and marry a woman of their choosing. He rejects all pleas and returns to find Kanmani tending Sundaram in the bedroom. He falsely suspets Kanmani of infidelity. Enraged, he leaves for his parents' place and agrees to an arranged marriage.

The proposal reaches Rani's father. Unaware of his previous marriage, Rani consents to marry Raja. Kanmani is happy for her best friend as she is unaware that her husband is the groom. Devastated upon learning the truth, she tries to end her own life. Raghu intervenes at the right time and makes sure she gets prescribed the wrong pills. He reaches the wedding venue and makes everyone aware of Raja's prior marriage to Kanmani. A furious Rani then confronts Raja. Sundaram too joins and clarifies the misunderstanding. Raja then realizes his mistake and seeks Kanmani's forgiveness, which she gives happily. Saragapani, finally abandons his prejudices and dismissed the ideas fed to him by the malicious old man. He accepts Kanmani into the family, while Rani agrees to marry Raghu. The films ends with Sarangapani, now singing about the glory of women, and the couples' happy union.

== Cast ==
Male cast

- Gemini Ganesan as Raja
- S. Balachander as Raghu
- S. V. Sahasranamam
- K. Sarangapani
- V. Nagayya
- V. K. Ramasamy
- P. D. Sambandam

Female cast

- Vyjayanthimala as Rani
- Anjali Devi as Kanmani
- K. N. Kamalam
- K. R. Chellam
- Baby Rhadha

== Production ==
Penn was produced by A. V. Meiyappan, the founder of AVM Productions. It was simultaneously shot in Hindi as Ladki and in Telugu as Sangham. Vyjayanthimala appeared as the female lead in all three versions. Gemini Ganesan was cast after Meiyappan was impressed with his performance in Thai Ullam (1952).

== Soundtrack ==
The music was composed by R. Sudarsanam. The song Kalyaanam Kalyaanam....... Ullaasamaagave Ulagaththil Vaazhave sung by J. P. Chandrababu for S. Balachander became an instant hit and is broadcast by many television channels to date. It was remixed by Sundar C. Babu for Thoonga Nagaram (2011).

Song	Singers	Lyrics	Length
"Jaadhi Bedham Pesum Pollaa Samookam Maaraadhaa"	V. Nagayya		02:24
"Sonna Sollai Maranthidalaamo Vaa Vaa Vaa"	T. S. Bagavathi & M. S. Rajeswari		04:12
"Eliyor Manam Paadum Paattile...Aandavan Aagaasamadhil Thoongukinraare"	C. S. Jayaraman	Udumalai Narayana Kavi	03:48
"Vaal Munaiyin Sakthiyinaal Ulagai Aaluvom"	T. S. Bagavathi, M. S. Rajeswari & P. Susheela	Udumalai Narayana Kavi	08:33
"Maadhar Thammai Izhivu Seyyum Madamaiyai Koluththuvom"	T. A. Mothi		02:15
"Baaradha Naattukkinai Baaradha Naade"	M. S. Rajeswari		07:35
"Kalyaanam Kalyaanam...Ullaasamaagave Ulagaththil Vaazhave"	J. P. Chandrababu	Udumalai Narayana Kavi	03:03
"Pollaath Thanathai Enna Solven"	T. S. Bagavathi		04:27
"Agila Bharadha Penngal"	M. S. Rajeswari		03:06
"Pennai Nambaadhe Manidhaa"	K. Sarangapani		04:16
"Ettaadha Kilaiyil Kittaadha Kani Pol"	M. S. Rajeswari	K. P. Kamatchi	04:14
"Kaadhal Inba Vaazhvile Minnaamale Idi Veezhndhadhe"	T. S. Bagavathi		03:29

== Box office ==
The film was a hit at box office.
