= Athisaya Penn =

1959 film

- Theatrical release poster
- Directed by: M. V. Raman
- Written by: Javar Seetharaman
- Produced by: M. V. Raman
- Starring: Akkineni Nageswara Rao; Vyjayanthimala
- Cinematography: T. Muthu Sami
- Edited by: M. V. Raman
- Music by: S. M. Subbaiah Naidu
- Production company: Raman Productions
- Release date: 6 March 1959
- Country: India
- Language: Tamil

Athisaya Penn (transl. Wonder Woman) is a 1959 Indian Tamil-language romantic comedy film, produced and directed by M. V. Raman. The film stars Akkineni Nageswara Rao and Vyjayanthimala, with music composed by S. M. Subbaiah Naidu. It is a remake of the Hindi film Aasha (1957). The film was released on 6 March 1959.

== Cast ==
- Vyjayanthimala as Nirmala
- A. Nageswara Rao as Manivannan
- Manohar as Raju
- Madhuri Devi as Lally
- K. Sarangapani as Muthuraja
- M. S. Draupathi as Maragatham
- Javert N. Seetharaman
- Kamini
- V. P. S. Mani
- M. S. Karuppaiah
- K. S. Angamuthu
- V. M. Ezhumalai
- Gajakarnam
- S. G. Eshwar
- Kalyanam
- V. Seetharaman
- Ashokan (Guest artiste)
- K. N. Kamalam
- E. V. Saroja

== Production ==
Athisaya Penn is a remake of the 1957 Hindi-language film Aasha, and has both the lead actress Vyjayanthimala and director M. V. Raman returning. The film was shot primarily in Gevacolor, with some portions in Technicolor.

== Soundtrack ==
The music was composed by S. M. Subbaiah Naidu. The song "Eena Meena Deeka" is based on the song of the same name from Aasha.

Song	Singers	Lyricist	Length
"Anipillai Tennampillai"	Seergazhi Govindarajan	V. Seetharaman	03:18
"Eena Meena Deeka" [Female]	P. Susheela	V. Seetharaman	03:19
"Eena Meena Deeka" [Male]	T. M. Soundararajan	V. Seetharaman	03:09
"Eppo Varuvaro"	P. Susheela	V. Seetharaman	03:05
"Makara Veenai"	A. P. Komala		02:30
"Sila Per Vazha"	T. M. Soundararajan	Subbu Arumugam	03:15
"Thanni Podura Pazhakam"	T. M. Soundararajan		03:14
"Unnai Ninaichale"	P. Susheela	V. Setharaman	03:13
"Unthan Jaalam"	P. Susheela	V. Seetharaman	
"Kalangatha Ullamum"	P. Susheela	V. Seetharaman	
"Angum Ingum Engum Niraindha"	T. M. Soundararajan	V. Seetharaman	

== Release and reception ==
Athisaya Penn was released on 6 March 1959. Kanthan of Kalki called the pre-interval portions better than the post-interval ones.
