= Marma Veeran =

- Theatrical release poster
- Directed by: T. R. Raghunath
- Written by: A. L. Narayanan
- Produced by: V. Govindarajan; Sriram
- Starring: Sriram; Vyjayanthimala
- Cinematography: R. Sampath
- Edited by: Kandaswamy
- Music by: S. Vedhachalam
- Production company: Jubilee Films
- Release date: 3 August 1956
- Country: India
- Language: Tamil

Marma Veeran (transl. Mysterious Warrior) is a 1956 Indian Tamil-language film written by A. L. Narayanan and directed by T. R. Raghunath and was produced by actor Sriram. The film starred Sriram and Vyjayanthimala with N. T. Rama Rao, Sivaji Ganesan and Gemini Ganesan in guest appearances with Rajasulochana, V. Nagayya, P. S. Veerappa, J. P. Chandrababu, K. A. Thangavelu, M. N. Rajam and T. S. Balaiah forming an ensemble cast. V. Govindarajan of Jubilee Films was the co-producer.

== Cast ==
- Sriram as Mahindra / Paramveer
- Vyjayanthimala as Rajkumari Vijaya
- Rajasulochana as Kamini
- M. N. Rajam as Mohini
- V. Nagayya
- T. S. Balaiah
- J. P. Chandrababu
- P. S. Veerappa
- K. A. Thangavelu
- T. K. Ramachandran
- Helen as Narthaki in Special appearance
- N. T. Rama Rao in Guest appearance
- Sivaji Ganesan in Guest appearance
- Gemini Ganesan in Guest appearance
- S. V. Ranga Rao in Guest appearance
- R. Nageshwara Rao in Guest appearance

== Soundtrack ==
The music was composed by Vedha. He was introduced as the music director in the film. He was credited as S. Vedhachalam in the film's song book.

Song	Singers	Lyrics	Length
"Thudikkum Vaalibame"	R. Balasaraswathi Devi	Pattukkottai Kalyanasundaram	03:22
"Aasai Ellam Niraasai"	Jikki		03:25
"Pavazha Naattu Ellaiyile Mullai Aadudhu"	P. Susheela & K. Rani	Villiputhan	03:10
"Sooriyanai.... Kaathirundhen Romba Nalla"	K. Jamuna Rani	A. Maruthakasi	03:34
"Vizhi Pesuthe Vilaiyaadudhe"	P. Susheela	A. L. Narayanan	04:24
"Ottrumaiyil.... Anbirukkudhu Arivirukkudhu"	A. M. Rajah, T. A. Mothi & S. C. Krishnan	Pattukottai Kalyanasundaram	03:21
"O Aiyaa O Ammaa"	J. P. Chandrababu, K. Rani, S. C. Krishnan & Jikki	A. Maruthakasi	03:40
"Munnale Pogaame"	T. M. Soundararajan & K. R. Chellamuthu	A. Maruthakasi	02:47
"Itthanai Naalaaga"	P. Leela & Jikki	A. Maruthakasi	04:12
""			03:58
"Thillalangadi Kuyile Adi"	J. P. Chandrababu & P. Leela	Thanjai N. Ramaiah Dass	03:45
"Aaraaro.... Pillayum Kuttiyum Petthukkanga"	M. S. Rajeswari &		03:05

Veguchukka (Telugu dubbed) Songs

The film's score was composed by Vedha and M. Ranga Rao. Lyrics were penned by Samudrala Jr.

Song	Singers	Length
"Kshanamou Virisamamu"	Jikki	03:22
"Aashalanni Nirasha"	Jikki	03:25
"Pavalanati Yellalalo"	A. P. Komala	01:23
"Sooryuni.... Kachukunna Sambarana"	K. Jamuna Rani	03:34
"Valapayera Valarayada"	P. Susheela	04:24
"Ekamai Cheriyunna....Thempuvunnadhi Thelivunnadhi"	Ghantasala, Pithapuram Nageswara Rao, P. B. Sreenivas & Madhavapeddi Satyam	03:21
"O Aiyaa O Ammaa"	M. S. Rama Rao	03:40
"Kalam Maripoyinadhe"	P. B. Sreenivas & Pithapuram Nageswara Rao	02:47
"Inni Dhinalaye"	P. Leela & Jikki	04:12
"Ninnenchunoyi Krishna"	Soolamangalam Rajalakshmi	03:58
"Ravva Rangula Guvva"	Pithapuram Nageswara Rao & P. Leela	03:45

== Reception ==
Kanthan of Kalki appreciated the screenplay and dialogues, but said audiences expecting mysteries in the film would feel cheated.
