= Chitor Rani Padmini =

1963 film by Chitrapu Narayana Rao

- Theatrical release poster
- Directed by: Ch. Narayana Murthy
- Written by: C. V. Sridhar; Elangovan
- Produced by: R. M. Ramanthan
- Starring: Sivaji Ganesan; Vyjayanthimala
- Cinematography: Bomman D. Irani; V. Kumaara Thevan
- Edited by: M. A. Perumal
- Music by: G. Ramanathan
- Production company: Uma Pictures
- Release date: 9 February 1963
- Country: India
- Language: Tamil

Chitor Rani Padmini (transl. Padmini, queen of Chitor) is a 1963 Indian Tamil-language historical drama film written by C. V. Sridhar and Elangovan, and directed by Ch. Narayana Murthy. It is based on the legend of Rani Padmini. The film starred Sivaji Ganesan as Rana Ratan Singh and Vyjayanthimala as the title character. M. N. Nambiar, T. S. Balaiah, Kaka Radhakrishnan, and T. P. Muthulakshmi appear in supporting roles. It was released on 9 February 1963.

== Cast ==
- Vyjayanthimala as Rani Padmini
- Sivaji Ganesan as Rawal Ratan Singh/Rana Ratan Singh/Bheem Singh
- T. S. Balaiah as Alauddin Khalji
- M. N. Nambiar as Malik Kafur
- D. Balasubramaniam
- Kaka Radhakrishnan
- T. K. Sampangi
- Kannan
- Kumar
- Pulimmootai Ramasami
- Rushyendramani
- T. P. Muthulakshmi
- Vijaya
- Ragini
- Helen

== Production ==
Production began in 1957–58, but progressed slowly for years due to financial troubles.

== Soundtrack ==
The music was composed by G. Ramanathan.

Song	Singers	Lyrics	Length
"Parthukondirundhale Podhum"	Seerkazhi Govindarajan	Udumalai Narayana Kavi	11:20
"Devi Vijaya Bhavani"	P. Susheela	Surabhi	04:22
"Oho Nila Raani"	Seerkazhi Govindarajan	Ku. Ma. Balasubramaniam	05:00
"Hum Tekaa Mele Shokkaa Aadum"	S. Janaki	Thanjai N. Ramaiah Dass	05:00
"Chittu Sirippadhu Pole"	Seerkazhi Govindarajan & P. Susheela	Kannadasan	06:50
"Vaanathil Meen Ondru Kandaan"	Soolamangalam Rajalakshmi	Surabhi	03:47
"Aadal Paadal Kaanum Podhe"	S. Janaki	Ku. Ma. Balasubramaniam	05:35
"Vaanathil Soozhndhadhu Megam"	P. Susheela	A. Maruthakasi	

== Release and reception ==
Chitor Rani Padmini was released on 9 February 1963, delayed from November 1961. The magazine Kumudam faulted it for "despicable distortion", while another magazine, Kalki lamented that Padmini, an icon of chastity, had been turned into a dancing queen. Viewers, however, praised Vyjayanthimala's dancing, despite the fact that the real Padmini was not known to be a dancer. The film was commercially unsuccessful.
