= Baghdad Thirudan =

1960 film

- Theatrical release poster
- Directed by: T. P. Sundaram
- Written by: A. S. Muthu (dialogues)
- Produced by: T. P. Sundaram; Harilal Patoviya
- Starring: M. G. Ramachandran; Vyjayanthimala
- Cinematography: M. Krishnaswamy
- Edited by: G. D. Joshi
- Music by: G. Govindarajulu Naidu
- Production company: Southern Movies
- Release date: 6 May 1960
- Running time: 169 minutes
- Country: India
- Language: Tamil

Baghdad Thirudan (transl. The Thief of Baghdad) is a 1960 Indian Tamil-language swashbuckler film produced and directed by T. P. Sundaram. The film stars M. G. Ramachandran and Vyjayanthimala, with M. N. Nambiar, T. S. Balaiah, T. R. Ramachandran, S. A. Ashokan, M. N. Rajam, A. Sandhya and S. N. Lakshmi in supporting roles. It is a remake of the 1924 American film The Thief of Bagdad and was inspired by the 1951 film The Prince Who Was a Thief. The film was released on 6 May 1960.

== Plot ==
Following the betrayal of the Prime Minister, the Maharaja and Maharani of the kingdom are murdered and their son, Abu, is hidden in a herd of cows. Abu is found by robbers, who were hidden in the forest and eventually grows up to become their leader. The two impostors who sit on the throne have a daughter and a child servant who poses as the son who survived the death of the former royal couple. Abu robs the rich to give to the poor and strives to reconquer his kingdom.

== Cast ==
Male cast

- M. G. Ramachandran as Abu
- M. N. Nambiar as Hyder / Chinna Sarkar
- T. S. Balaiah as Periya Sarkar
- T. R. Ramachandran as Abu's friend
- S. A. Ashokan as Qayyum
- S. V. Sahasranamam
- K. Kannan as Bandit

Female cast

- Vyjayanthimala as Zarina
- M. N. Rajam as Princess Zubeida
- S. N. Lakshmi as Begum
- Sandhya as Gulshad
- M. S. S. Bhagyam
- K. S. Angamuthu as Princess Friend
- Helen as Dancer

== Production ==
Baghdad Thirudan was financed by Krishnaswamy Naidu, the former owner of Golden Studios. A single set in the film cost ₹30,000 (equivalent to ₹2.7 million or US$28,000 in 2023), yet M. G. Ramachandran always wanted new sets. By this type of over-expenditure, it was believed that the film would ultimately cost ₹500,000 (equivalent to ₹45 million or US$470,000 in 2023). Ramachandran demanded that an additional ₹200,000 (equivalent to ₹18 million or US$190,000 in 2023) be spent to complete the film, much to Naidu's horror. Baghdad Thirudan was also the only film that featured Ramachandran opposite Vyjayanthimala. Ramachandran briefly served as the film's editor. He said, "I was at the editing table, and it was so easy to join the cuts, because the movements just flowed into each other". S. N. Lakshmi had to fight a leopard in one scene without the use of a stunt double. She later remarked that she feared cats.

== Soundtrack ==
The music composed by G. Govindarajulu Naidu. All lyrics were penned by A. Maruthakasi.

| Song | Singers | Length |
|---|---|---|
| "Azhagu Laila" | A. P. Komala | 02:28 |
| "Enthan Kathai Idhana" | P. Suseela | 02:51 |
| "Vetri Kollum Vaalendhi" | P. Suseela | 05:24 |
| "Kanneerin Vellam" | P. Suseela | 03:16 |
| "Pothukulunguthey...Sokkudhe Manam" | P. Suseela | 03:30 |
| "Bul Bul Paarvaiyile" | K. Jamuna Rani | 02:12 |
| "Siricha Pothum" | Jikki & group | 02:44 |
| "Unmai Anbin" | T. M. Soundararajan & P. Suseela | 02:18 |
| "Yaarukku Dimikki" | T. M. Soundararajan | 02:34 |

== Release and reception ==
Baghdad Thirudan was released on 6 May 1960, and had an average run. Kanthan of Kalki said there was nothing special about the film, but it could be watched for Ramachandran. Later it was dubbed in Hindi and released as Baghdad in 1962.
