= M. V. Raman =

Indian film maker (born 1913)

- Born: Mahalingam Venkat Raman; 26 June 1913; Tiruchirapalli, Tamil Nadu, India
- Died: 1980s/90s
- Occupations: Film director, editor, producer
- Spouse: V. Meenakshi (until his death)

Mahalingam Venkat Raman (26 June 1913—c. 1980s/90s) was an Indian film director, editor and writer who was active mainly in Tamil and Hindi cinema.

== Life ==
M. V. Raman was the son of a lawyer. Though he originally graduated in the field of accounts, he later took to cinema in the late 1930s. Beginning his career as an editor, Raman later indulged in writing and directing. He worked as associate director and storywriter on the Tamil film Vaazhkai (1949), and was responsible for casting Vyjayanthimala as the lead actress, her feature film debut. He later directed the film's Telugu and Hindi remakes Jeevitham (1950) and Bahar (1951), and after the latter's success remained active mainly in Bombay, while occasionally returning to his native Tamil Nadu. He established Raman Productions in the 1950s, and went on to direct numerous successful films including Aasha (1957), its Tamil remake Athisaya Penn (1957), Konjum Salangai (1962) and Pattanathil Bhootham (1967). In 1991, historian Randor Guy wrote that Raman, despite his success in the film industry, "faded away soon for reasons of his own making, and died some years ago". Raman was married to V. Meenakshi, who died in 1993.

== Filmography ==
Year	Title
1949	Vaazhkai
1950	Jeevitham
1953	Ladki
1954	Sangham
1954	Penn
1955	Vadina
1955	Pehli Jhalak
1956	Bhai Bhai
1957	Aasha
1958	Chandan
1959	Athisaya Penn
1962	Konjum Salangai
1967	Pattanathil Bhootham
1968	Payal Ki Jhankar
1971	Jwala
