= Aasha (1957 film) =

Film directed by M. V. Raman

- Directed by: M. V. Raman
- Written by: Rajinder Krishan
- Story by: Javar Seetharaman
- Produced by: M. V. Raman
- Starring: Kishore Kumar; Vyjayanthimala; Pran; Om Prakash
- Cinematography: Fali Mistry; S. Hardip
- Edited by: M. V. Raman
- Music by: C. Ramchandra
- Production company: Raman Productions
- Distributed by: Raman Productions
- Release date: 1957
- Running time: 171 minutes
- Country: India
- Language: Hindi

Aasha (transl. Hope) is a 1957 Indian Hindi-language romantic comedy film directed by M. V. Raman. It stars Kishore Kumar and Vyjayanthimala. The film was a critical and commercial success. This film was partly coloured by both Gevacolor and Technicolor. The film was remade in Tamil as Athisaya Penn. Asha Parekh makes a special appearance.

== Plot ==
The story is about Kishore who is a good-hearted person and always helps poor people even though he is from a rich Zamindar (property owner) family. One day, he travels to Bombay to stay with his cousin Raj, who cheats a lot with girls. When they both go for a hunt in the jungle, Raj meets a man who demands he marry his jilted daughter. Raj murders the father and he frames Kishore for the crime. Kishore is forced to flee. Finally, Kishore and his lover Nirmala prove that Raj is the guilty one, and Raj tells the truth in front of everyone. Now the police arrest Raj and Kishore marries Nirmala amid happy celebrations.

== Cast ==
- Kishore Kumar as Kishore
- Vyjayanthimala as Nirmala
- Pran as Raj
- Om Prakash as Hasmukhlal
- Minoo Mumtaz as Munni
- Lalita Pawar as Durga
- Asha Parekh a(special appearance)

== Soundtrack ==
The music was composed by C. Ramchandra and the lyrics were written by Rajendra Krishan. The song "Eena Meena Deeka", sung by Kishore Kumar and Asha Bhosle in two different versions, became very popular. It was one of the Hindi cinema's first rock and roll numbers. The words of the song were inspired by children playing outside C. Ramchandra's music room. The children were chanting "Eeny, meeny, miny, moe", which inspired C. Ramchandra and his assistant John Gomes to create the first line of the song, "Eena Meena Deeka, De Dai Damanika". Gomes, who was a Goan, added the words "Maka Naka" (Konkani for "I don't want"). They kept on adding more nonsense rhymes till they ended with "Rum Pum Posh!". It was later covered by Timid Tiger and Goldspot. Eastern Eye magazine declared Kishore Kumar's version of "Eena Meena Deeka" as one of his top 10 best songs.

Song	Singer
"Ek Padosi Raat Ko Soye"	Kishore Kumar
"Haal Tujhe Apni Duniya Ka"	Kishore Kumar
"Eena Meena Deeka" (Male)	Kishore Kumar
"Eena Meena Deeka" (Female)	Asha Bhosle
"So Ja Re Chanda So Ja"	Asha Bhosle
"Tu Na Aaya"	Lata Mangeshkar
"Zara Ruk Rukke"	Lata Mangeshkar
"Chal Chal Re Kanhai"	Lata Mangeshkar

== Use in media ==
An advertising campaign by the JWT agency of London for the UK bank HSBC in October 2008 used the "Eena Meena Deeka" song from the film as background music.
