= Vyjayanthimala =

Indian actress, dancer and parliamentarian (born 1933)

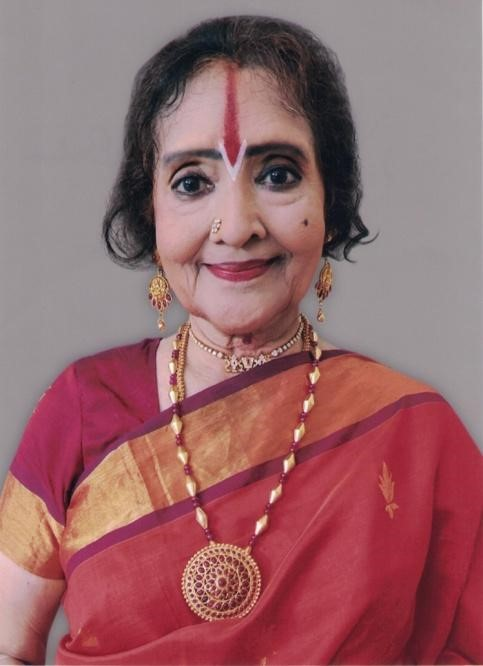
- Vyjayanthimala in 2024
- Born: Vyjayanthimala Raman; 13 August 1933 (age 93); Triplicane, Madras, Madras Presidency, British India
- Occupations: Actress, Indian classical dancer, Carnatic singer, politician
- Years active: 1949–1970
- Works: Full list
- Spouse: Chamanlal Bali (m. 1968; died 1986)
- Children: Suchindra Bali
- Mother: Vasundhara Devi
- Awards: Full list
- Honours: Padma Vibhushan (2024); Padma Shri (1968); Kalaimamani (1979); Sangeet Natak Akademi Award (1982)

Member of Parliament Lok Sabha
- In office 1984–1991
- Preceded by: Ramaswamy Venkataraman
- Succeeded by: R. Sridharan
- Constituency: Chennai South

Member of Parliament, Rajya Sabha
- In office 27 August 1993 – 26 August 1999

Personal details
- Party: Bharatiya Janata Party (1999–present)
- Other political affiliations: Indian National Congress (1984–1999)

Vyjayanthimala Bali (née Raman; born 13 August 1933), known mononymously as Vyjayanthimala, is an Indian parliamentarian, dancer and former actress. Considered the first female superstar of Indian Cinema, she successfully transitioned from a child actor to one of the highest-paid and leading actresses of the 1950s and 1960s. Her performances were noted for integrating Indian classical dance with dramatic acting, helping her establish herself as one of Hindi cinema's finest actresses and dancers. In addition to several accolades, including four Filmfare Awards and two BFJA Awards, she was awarded the Padma Shri from the Government of India in 1968 and later Padma Vibhushan in 2024.

She made her screen debut at the age of sixteen with the Tamil film Vaazhkai (1949), and followed this with a role in the Telugu film Jeevitham (1950). Her first work in Hindi cinema was the social guidance film Bahar (1951), which she headlined, and achieved her breakthrough with the romance Nagin (1954). She garnered widespread critical acclaim for her role in the period drama Devdas (1955), where she played Chandramukhi, a tawaif with a heart of gold. The film and her acting were highly praised, later considered to be her magnum opus. For Devdas, she won the Filmfare Award for Best Supporting Actress which she refused, stating that she played a leading role equal to that of Suchitra Sen, her co-star, and so she could not accept the award for a supporting role. She went on to star in series of commercial successes, which include the romance New Delhi (1956), the social drama Naya Daur (1957) and the comedy Aasha (1957). Her roles in the social drama Sadhna (1958) and the paranormal romance Madhumati (1958), each earned her a nomination for the Filmfare Awards for Best Actress, winning for the former which makes her the first ever actor to receive dual nominations in an acting category in the same year. The nominations also makes her the first-ever multi-nominee across all categories. This win makes her the first performer in Filmfare history to win in both leading and supporting categories.

In the 1960s, the crime drama Gunga Jumna (1961) saw Vyjayanthimala playing a rustic village belle, Dhanno, a role which won her the Filmfare Award for Best Actress. She won the award again for the musical romantic drama Sangam (1964). She went on reinvent her image, earning a mixed reception after notably appearing in a one-piece swimsuit in a film role. She later achieved acclaim for her performance in the historical drama Amrapali (1966) which was based on the life of Nagarvadhu, royal courtesan of Vaishali, Amrapali. Her notable successes following were the swashbuckler film Suraj (1966), the heist film Jewel Thief (1967), the Bengali art film Hatey Bazarey (1967), the action drama film Sunghursh (1968) and the epic film Prince (1969).

In 1968, she was awarded the Padma Shri by the Government of India, the fourth-highest civilian honor. After a starring role in the film Ganwaar (1970), Vyjayanthimala retired from the acting industry. She has since gained popularity for her dancing, particularly for her work in Bharata Natyam, a form of Indian classical dance, and was later given the Sangeet Natak Akademi Award, the highest Indian recognition given to practising artists. In 2024, she was awarded the Padma Vibhushan, the second-highest civilian honor granted by the Government of India.

== Background and personal life ==
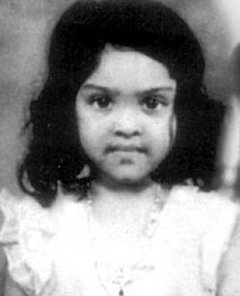
Vyjayanthimala at the age of five in 1938

She was born in Chennai : Triplicane near Parthasarathy Temple in a Tamil family to Mandyam Dhati Raman and Vasundhara Devi. She was raised primarily by her grandmother, Yadugiri Devi. Her mother tongue is Tamil. Her mother was a leading actress in Tamil Cinema in the 1940s where her Mangama Sabatham was the first Tamil film to be declared a "colossal" hit at the box office.

At the age of 7, Vyjayanthimala was chosen to perform a classical Indian dance for Pope Pius XII while her mother was in audience in 1940 at Vatican City. Vyjayanthimala attended Sacred Heart Higher Secondary School, Presentation Convent, Church Park, Chennai. She learned Bharatnatyam from Vazhuvoor Ramaiah Pillai and Carnatic music from D. K. Pattammal, K. V. Narayanaswamy, M. S. Subbulakshmi, K. P. Kittappa Pillai and Thanjavur K. P. Sivanandam, and Manakkal Sivaraja Iyer. She had her arangetram at the age of 13 and started performing in all over Tamil Nadu later. Her maternal uncle is Y. G. Parthasarathy. In 1938, her grandfather, Mandyam Dhati Gopalacharya, started a nursing home on Narayan Shastri Road, Mysore.

=== Relationships ===
In her heyday, Vyjayanthimala was the subject of many controversies, particularly for her misconstrued relationships with her co-stars. In the early 1960s, actor Raj Kapoor had commenced the filming of Sangam with Vyjayanthimala playing the female lead along with Rajendra Kumar and Kapoor himself as the male lead. The filming took four years to finish. During this time Vyjayanthimala is said to have been romantically involved with Kapoor and almost married him. Initially, she was vexed with him and kept him at a distance. However, Kapoor did not give up over her attitude. However, Vyjayanthimala in her autobiography mentioned that it was a publicity stunt by newspapers in North India to link her with Raj Kapoor and that she was never in any relationship with him.

Vyjayanthimala married the already married Chamanlal Bali, a Punjabi Hindu Arya Samaji from Delhi but lived in Anna Salai, Chennai in 1968. After marriage, she gave up her acting career and moved to Chennai. However, between 1968 and 1970, she shot for those films which she had signed before her marriage, such as Pyar Hi Pyar, Prince and Ganwaar. They have a son, Suchindra Bali. In 2007, she published her autobiography, titled Bonding, with Jyoti Sabarwal as a co-writer.

=== Religious views ===
Vyjayanthimala is a devout Vaishnava Hindu and a vegetarian. She grew up listening to holy chants and devotional songs. She is an admirer of Aandaal, one of the 12 Alvar saints of Hinduism. She prays to Goddess Saraswati before any public performance to gain her blessing. In February 2024, at age 90, she took part in Raag Sewa performance series at Ram Mandir, Ayodhya, with a Bharatnatyam dance recital, and its video soon became viral on social media.

== Acting career ==
=== 1949–1954: Early success in South Indian films ===
When director M. V. Raman was looking for a new face to cast in AVM Productions's Vazhkai (1949), he saw Vyjayanthimala performing Bharata Natyam in Chennai's Gokhale Hall. He tried to convince her grandmother, who was apprehensive about Vyjayanthimala joining films as she felt her grand daughter was too young to act in the films and also it would come in the way of her education and dance. Vyjayanthimala barely at 13 played a college girl named Mohana Shivashankaralingam and acted along with senior actors S. V. Sahasranamam, M. S. Draupadi, T. R. Ramachandran and K. Sankarapani. The movie was a big success and was remade in Telugu after one year as Jeevitham (1950) with a slightly different cast, namely C. H. Narayana Rao, S. Varalakshmi and C. S. R. Anjaneyulu. This film enjoyed great success upon release. For the Telugu version, Vyjayanthimala did her own voice dubbing with a little assistance from her father who knew Telugu well and coached her during the filming process. Vyjayanthimala also did a guest appearance in the 1950 film Vijayakumari which had actress T. R. Rajakumari in a dual role. She danced for the song "laalu...laalu...laalu" which was choreographed by Vedantam Raghavayya. Though the film was not a commercial success, her western-style of dance became popular and was considered one of the major highlights of the film. The success of her Tamil film Vazhkai in South India inspired AVM Productions to remake it in Hindi as Bahar in 1951. In their first Hindi venture, they decided to cast Vyjayanthimala again in the lead role with Karan Dewan, Om Prakash and Pandari Bai (who was credited as Padmini in the film). She learned Hindi at the Hindi Prachar Sabha to dub her own voice for her character in the film. Upperstall.com in their review, wrote that "She does bring the film to life with her dances though, something which was new then for the North Indian audience". The film became sixth highest-grossing film of 1951 with a verdict of box office hit. After the success of her debut films in all three languages, Vyjayanthimala again acted in a multilingual film which was produced by Avichi Meiyappa Chettiar of AVM Productions. The first version was in Tamil as Penn (1954) where she co-starred with actor Gemini Ganesan, S. Balachander and Anjali Devi. "Kalyanam...venum" sung by J. P. Chandrababu for Balachander became an instant hit. The second version was in Telugu titled Sangham (1954) which was released in the same year with N. T. Rama Rao, Vyjayanthimala, S. Balachandran and Anjali Devi in the lead. The Tamil and the Telugu films were big successes across South India. The film was once again remade in Hindi as Ladki (1953) starring Kishore Kumar and Bharat Bhushan, while Vyjayanthimala, along with Anjali Devi, reprised her role from the original film. Her performance was described by Upperstall.com as, "Vyjayanthimala's dances are the film's saving grace although it is unintentionally funny now to see how deliberate and obviously tacky the sequences are which lead into her dances... Ladki too makes no real demands on "feminist" tomboy Vyjayanthimala histrionically". The film emerged as the second highest-grossing film of 1953.

In 1954, Vyjayanthimala acted in the romance Nagin (1954) with Pradeep Kumar. The film got favourable responses from the audience and became the highest-grossing film of 1954 where it was labelled as a blockbuster at the box-office. Her performance as the Nagi tribe's chief got Mala favourable reviews from critics, as in 1955, a critic from Filmfare magazine had said that "Vyjayanthimala in the title role puts over a commendable performance besides looking ravishingly beautiful as the belle of the hills. Her dancing, too, is very graceful, specially in those eye-filling colour sequences and delightful ballets towards the finish", while in The Hindu review Vijay Lokapally similarly praised her portrayal: "The ethereal Vyjayanthimala, barely 18, illuminates the screen with her stunning beauty, moving around daintily from one song to the other... The close-up shots of Vyjayanthimala highlight her ability to convey so much with so little effort... Nagin was a precursor to her rise in Hindi cinema as an iconic actor, who combined her talents, performing and dancing, to rule the screen on her terms... biggest recall values of Nagin are Vyjayanthimala". Post Nagin, Vyjayanthimala had established herself as one of the leading actresses in Hindi films because of the film's nationwide success. Hemant Kumar's music and her dance on the song, "Man Dole, Mera tan dole", rendered by Lata Mangeshkar was one of the highlights of the film. In the same year she acted in Miss Mala with Kishore Kumar, which was a box office success. Vyjayanthimala debuted in Kannada cinema through a film called Asha Nirasha which was produced by G. D. Venkatram. The film had Lata Mangeshkar, Asha Bhosle and Mohammed Rafi as the playback singers, but the film was unreleased, though the producer's son Srikant Venkatram claimed that the film was released and flopped miserably at box office which made the film obscure.

=== 1955–1957: Devdas and breakthrough ===
In 1955, Vyjayanthimala acted in five Hindi films. The first one was director Abdur Rashid Kardar's Yasmin alongside actor Suresh, which won the Filmfare Award for Best Cinematography for Dwarka Divecha. Besides that, she also starred in three other films, Pehli Jhalak with Kishore Kumar, Sitara with Pradeep Kumar and Jashan with Karan Dewan. Eventually all her four films released in 1955 failed at the box office. The same year, Bimal Roy cast her as Chandramukhi opposite Dilip Kumar in the critically acclaimed Devdas, which was the adaptation of the novel with same title by Sharat Chandra Chatterji. The industry initially was not in favour of this choice when they heard about Vyjayanthimala being cast in Bimal Roy's film, the response being: "Why don't you take comedian Kishore Kumar as Devdas?". Initially Nargis was selected for Chandramukhi's role, but she refused to accept the role. The role was later offered to Bina Rai and Suraiya but they too turned it down as they wanted to essay the lead role of Paro, which was earlier offered to Meena Kumari. Subsequently, the film unit suffered with financial crisis and at this point Vyjayanthimala offered to do the role of Chandramukhi, where she said to Bimal Roy, "I am ready if you think I can do it". On the other hand, Nabendu Ghosh, the script writer of Devdas, said that, "I did not approve of Vyjayanthimala [as Chandramukhi], but we had no option – no one wanted to play Chandramukhi, and we were committed to our distributors... She was, of course, a very good actress, but she was too young for Chandramukhi, as envisioned by Saratbabu". On her performance, Rediff wrote: "Vyjayanthimala imbues Chandramukhi with true sympathy. Who better than Chandramukhi would know the pain of a hopeless love?... Vyjayanthimala, a star after the blockbuster Nagin, still had to establish her acting credentials when Roy went against the tide and cast her in the role of Chandramukhi". Subsequently, she won her only Filmfare Award for Best Supporting Actress but refused to accept it, stating that her role was a leading one and in equal importance to the role played by Suchitra Sen and not supporting. In 2006, a poll conducted by Rediff ranked her role of Chandramukhi as one of the best tawaif characters in Hindi films. Subsequently, the same role was listed in The Times of India's "10 Celluloid Hookers You Loved" at number six by Nikhat Kazmi. Though the film was critically successful, it did not garner much support at the box-office and ended up as the tenth highest-grossing film of the year with an average verdict.

After being recognised as a capable actress with Devdas, Vyjayanthimala acted in successful movies in 1956, namely Taj, Patrani and Anjaan: Somewhere in Delhi – all three films with Pradeep Kumar as the hero and Kismet Ka Khel with Sunil Dutt. In the same year, she also acted in swashbuckler film Devta, which was a remake of the hugely successful Tamil film Kanavaney Kankanda Deivam. Surprisingly though, she accepted a supporting role as a vamp which was originally done by Lalitha in the Tamil version. However, according to Upperstall.com, her role was very crucial in the film and her portrayal as the Naag Rani accompanied by her dance is the main attraction of the film. Also starring in the movie, reprising their lead roles from the original, were Gemini Ganesan and Anjali Devi. Meanwhile, she was signed by Sohrab Modi for his film Rajhath opposite Pradeep Kumar. However, due to her scheduling problems she was replaced by Madhubala. Vyjayanthimala then acted with Kishore Kumar again in the romantic comedy New Delhi, which became the fifth highest-grossing film of 1956. The film showcases a love that sprouts between a Punjabi boy, played Kishore Kumar, and a Tamil girl, played by Vyjayanthimala. Her performance was applauded by fans and critics alike; a review on Upperstall.com regarding her performance in the film states that: "Vyjayanthimala proves to be the perfect foil for Kishore Kumar...has always had the mandatory dance sequence in practically every film of hers evoking "classical art" associations. She excels in the two main dances in New Delhi – the solo Bharatnatayam Aliruppu number and the Bhangra folk dance in her Punjabi avatar and she is absolutely brilliant in the Bhangra folk dance...in her second avatar. Even Vyjayanthimala played a Punjabi girl and most successfully too". Subsequently, she did a Tamil film called Marma Veeran, along with Sriram, Rajasulochana, M. N. Rajam, J. P. Chandrababu and V. Nagayya. The film had some of the South Indian established actors such as N. T. Rama Rao, Sivaji Ganesan and Gemini Ganesan in a guest appearance. In 1957, director B. R. Chopra planned to make Naya Daur, with Ashok Kumar in the lead. However, the actor refused to accept this role and it later went to Dilip Kumar. For the female lead, the first choice of the director was the biggest star-actress of those days, Madhubala. But, as fate would have it, after 15 days of initial shooting at Mumbai, the director wanted the unit to travel to Bhopal for an extended outdoor shooting. However, Ataullah Khan, the father of Madhubala, objected to this and the role went to Vyjayanthimala. Chopra later sued Madhubala for the cash advance she received from him for the film, saying that she accepted the sum and now had no intention of completing it. Vyjyanthimala had previously acted with Dilip Kumar in Devdas and the duo shared an easy chemistry on-screen. The new film, Naya Daur, had a theme of "Man vs. machine", and Vyjanthi's portrayal of village belle Rajni received positive reviews from critics. A review from Rediff says that: "Vyjayanthimala too is not your average petulant "gaon ki gori". She ably projects a hands-on worker who comes up with ideas on how to ford a stream and risks her life to save the bridge... wonderful scene between two stars whose chemistry is undeniable" while reviewer Taran Adarsh from Bollywood Hungama mentions that: "Commendable performances come in from Vyjayantimala [natural]...The relationships [Dilip Kumar-Vyjayantimala] are so human and believable". At the end of its theatrical run, the film had collected around ₹ 54,000,000, thus becoming the second highest-grossing film of 1957, second only to the critically acclaimed Mother India, which became the highest-grossing Hindi language film ever at the time. Following that, Vyjayanthimala almost signed for the lead role in Filmistan's Tumsa Nahin Dekha opposite Dev Anand in 1957, but due to the producer Sashadhar Mukherjee's promise to actor Shammi Kapoor, he replaced Dev Anand with Shammi Kapoor. However, the director Nasir Hussain was in a quandary as he had already read the script to Dev Anand and Vyjayanthimala, but Mukerji prevailed and he also replaced Vyjayanthimala with Ameeta, who was the protégée of Filmistan Studios owner Tolaram Jalan. Vyjayanthimala's next release was Kathputli, in which she co-starred with actor Balraj Sahni for the first time. This film was about a young girl named Pushpa who, on account of being a good dancer and singer, assists puppeteer Shivraj in his puppet show. This film was director Amiya Chakravarty's last film. He died during the filming of Kathputli and the remaining project was completed by director Nitin Bose. Kathputli remains one of the memorable films of Vyjayanthimala which has an offbeat theme with a Pygmalion touch. Vyjayanthimala then acted in Ek Jhalak with Rajendra Kumar and Pradeep Kumar, which was produced by the latter with his home production company Deep & Pradeep Productions. She returned to the screen again with Kishore Kumar in the 1957 partially colour-made film Aasha which became a hit at the box office. The story revolves around the central character Kishore, played by Kishore Kumar, who, despite being a Zamindar, believes in helping the needy. Vyjayanthimala, as Nirmala, plays the lover of Kishore. The story suddenly goes from being light-hearted and humorous to a court-drama when Kishore is falsely accused of murder. The rest of the movie sees both the protagonists trying to prove Kishore's innocence. The movie is best known for its song "Eena Meena Dekha" sung by Kishore Kumar and Asha Bhosle, in two different versions. Aasha also introduced actress Asha Parekh to the silver screen, in a song alongside Vyjayanthimala, whom Parekh described as her matinee idol.

=== 1958–1959: Madhumati, Sadhna and continued acclaim ===
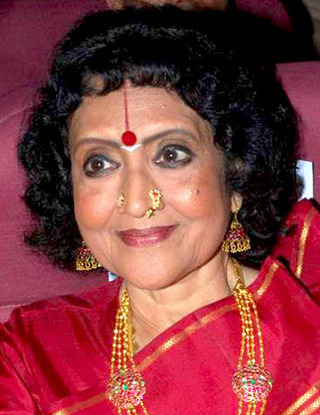
Vyjayanthimala at her tribute concert

The following year proved to be very successful for Vyjayanthimala, since she signed opposite Dilip Kumar in Bimal Roy's Madhumati in the title role. Originally supposed to essay four roles, the director finally scaled it down to three, Madhumati, Madhavi and Radha. The film was launched in front of the Karlovy Vary International Film Festival Theatre in Czechoslovakia. During the filming in the hills of Nainital, Vyjayanthimala was required to dance barefoot where she tripped on a stone and fell, hurting herself badly and causing damage to her fibre tissues in the sole of her foot. Roy, who was terrified and in a quandary over the incident as the shooting could not be stopped insisted on her wearing sandals which made it difficult for her during running sequences. Even after the completion of Madhumati, she still encountered the pain from the injury which always reminded her of Madhumati's shooting experience. Written by Ritwik Ghatak, the film is about Devendra, played by Dilip Kumar, who takes shelter during a storm in an abandoned house. Here he discovers a painting of the owner of the house Raja Ugranarayan, painted by him in his previous life when he was Anand, also played by Dilip Kumar, and worked as a foreman on a plantation of Raja Ugranarayan. Devendra had been in love with Madhumati, played by Vyjayanthimala. She had committed suicide while trying to save herself from Ugranarayan's advances. Madhumati's ghost finally takes revenge on Ugranarayan. The film was well received by critics and audience, and it became highest grossing Hindi language film of 1958 and was labelled as a blockbuster at the box office and ended up as the fifth highest-grossing film of the decade with its net adjusted to inflation to about ₹ 586.4 million. Her performance as Madhavi, Radha and the ghost Madhumati earned her accolades from critics. Shahid Khan from Planetbollywood.com said: "Vyjayantimala has never been one of my most favourite actresses but this is one of the few performances where I am completely bowled over by her. Her expressions while playing both the main characters are perfect. With Madhumati, she brings the wonder, surprise and innocence needed in the person. With Madhavi, she brings the poise, the curiosity and pity for the grief that Anand is going through", and Karan Bali from Upperstall.com wrote that: "For Vyjayanthimala, the film showcases both her acting as well as dancing abilities and the dizzying success of Madhumati took Vyjayanthimala to the highest rungs of stardom...to cap off an extremely successful year for her. Both, as an actress of considerable dramatic merit and as a star". Madhumati came to be known as the first film which dealt with the theme of reincarnation and had a gothic noir feel to it. The film later inspired films such as Milan (1967), The Reincarnation of Peter Proud (1975), Mehbooba (1976), Kudrat (1980), Karz (1980), Karan Arjun (1995) and particularly Om Shanti Om (2007) which had also lifted the film's climax which led to Rinki Bhattacharya, the late Roy's daughter accusing the film of plagiarism and threatening legal action against its producers. The same month she had another release, B. R. Chopra's Sadhna alongside Sunil Dutt. Vyjayanthimala was the second choice for the role of Champabai, the prostitute, after actress Nimmi who hesitated to play the role of a prostitute, which arguably led to her career decline. The Filmfare award-winning story by Mukhram Sharma revolves around Rajini, enacted by Vyjayanthimala, a prostitute's love affair with a professor, played by Sunil Dutt. Chopra, who previously directed Vyjayanthimala in Naya Daur, had adapted the theme on the rehabilitation of prostitutes which was then a controversial topic in India. Along with the film, her performance received universal acclaim, as told by Vijay Lokapally from The Hindu: "Among the great movies made on the subject of helpless women versus society, Sadhna holds its own for its realistic portrayal and treatment of a subject, so aesthetically documented by Chopra and Vyjayanthimala" and praised the latter "gorgeous when she entertains the clients at her kotha...stunningly restrained when she assumes the character of a prospective wife". Similarly, Rediff's critic Dinesh Raheja has commented that: "But finally, the show belongs to Vyjayanthimala. Fetchingly frivolous in the first half, she is suitably serious in the second. She makes her need for acceptance palpable; her eyes emit twin lasers of anger and condemnation at those that exploit women". Sadhna also performed well at the box office where it became fifth highest-grossing film of 1958 with trade pundits declaring the film a box office hit. Subsequently, Vyjayanthimala received two nominations for the Filmfare Award for Best Actress for Madhumati and Sadhna, winning her first trophy for the latter, after having refused to accept the Best Supporting Actress trophy for Devdas (1955) earlier. Her next release was Amar Deep, where she was paired against Dev Anand for the first time. A production of Sivaji Ganesan's Sivaji Productions, the film was a remake of 1956 Tamil film Amara Deepam, which had Ganesan himself in the lead. Along with Padmini, who reprised her role from the original, Vyjayanthimala plays the role of Aruna which was originally performed by actress Savitri in Tamil. Her other releases of 1958 Sitaroan Ke Aage and Piya Milan became average successes.

In 2011, in conjunction with actor Dev Anand's death, Vyjayanthimala recollected her memories during the filming in Madras, where she remembers the actor calling her "Papa", the Tamil termed that was used by her family and friends, and he would search for her throughout the sets while yelling "where is Papa, where is my heroine". According to Subhash Chheda, when Amar Deep was released, the long-awaited airing of Vyjayanthimala and Dev Anand was compared to the Madhubala and Dev Anand pair, where the public gave the verdict that: "If Madhubala brooks no equality, Vyjayanthimala admits no superiority". The film was liked by audience, but it failed to turn the Vyjayanthimala and Dev Anand team into a hit pair. The same year Vyjayanthimala was booked by M. G. Ramachandran for his second directorial venture Ponniyin Selvan. One of the first screen adaptations of Kalki Krishnamurthy's Ponniyin Selvan, the film had a huge ensemble cast consisting of Savitri, Gemini Ganesan, Padmini, Saroja Devi, M. N. Rajam and Nagesh along with Ramachandran and Vyjayanthimala. In the film, she was given the role of Kundavai, the elder sister of Raja Raja Chola I, played by Ganesan and the wife of Vallavaraiyan Vandiyadevan, played by Ramachandran. However, in mid-1958 the film was shelved for unknown reasons. The same year she did another Tamil film Gemini Pictures's magnum opus Vanjikottai Valiban along with Gemini Ganesan and Padmini. Written by Gemini Story Department which was headed by Kothamangalam Subbu, the Black-and-white epic film was produced and directed by S. S. Vasan. She played the role of Princess Mandakini, the beautiful princess of Ratna Island Kingdom. As a stubborn princess, she always wanted to achieve her ambition in any deed which led to her ultimate death and formed the climax. The film had a great theatrical run where the film completed 100 days run at cinemas and was labelled as a blockbuster at the box office. The film is still remembered for the dance of Vyjayanthimala and Padmini in the song "Kannum Kannum Kalanthu" which was choreographed by Hiralal, and was well received by critics and audience alike, wherein the popularity of the song surpassed the popularity garnered by the film. The song is still regarded as one of the best dance sequences in Indian cinema. Vanjikottai Valiban was followed by its Hindi version titled Raj Tilak. Screenplay of the film was by Ramanand Sagar. The film was directed by S. S. Vasan with Gemini Ganesan, Padmini, Vyjayanthimala in the lead. The film was hit at the box office, still it was unable to achieve the same box office success made by the Tamil version. By the end of the year, The Indian Express named Vyjayanthimala as the most successful female star of 1958. Similarly, Boxofficeindia.com ranked Vyjayanthimala at the top spot in their list of "Top Three Successful Box Office Actresses of 1958". In 1959, Vyjayanthimala reunited with Dilip Kumar for the fourth time in the bilingual Paigham. Produced and directed by S. S. Vasan, the film featured the lead actors along with Raaj Kumar, B. Saroja Devi, Pandari Bai and Motilal. Besides them, Vyjayanthimala's real-life mother Vasunthara Devi also acted in a small role where she played the role of mother to her own daughter who died in vain. Upon release Paigham became second highest-grossing film of 1959 with the verdict of a box office hit. The same year she did a Tamil film Athisaya Penn, where she co-starred with Telugu actor Akkineni Nageswara Rao for the first time. Athisaya Penn was a remake of Aasha, which again was directed by M. V. Raman. She acted opposite Pradeep Kumar in the romantic film Jawani Ki Hawa in 1959.

=== 1960–1964: Return to South Indian cinema and fluctuations ===
In 1960, Vyjayanthimala mostly concentrated on Tamil films to keep in touch with the industry. Her first release in 1960 was S. S. Vasan's Irumbu Thirai, the Tamil version of Paigham. She starred opposite Sivaji Ganesan for the second time after the latter's cameo appearance in Marma Veeran (1956). Along with Vyjayanthimala, all the female cast including B. Saroja Devi, Pandari Bai and Vasunthara Devi reprised their roles from the original with S. V. Ranga Rao in Motilal's role and K. A. Thangavelu in Raaj Kumar's character. The film was followed by Raja Bakthi, again with Sivaji Ganesan. Raja Bakthi had huge ensemble cast featuring P. Bhanumathi, Padmini, T. S. Balaiah and E. V. Saroja. Her subsequent release was D. Yoganand's magnum opus Parthiban Kanavu. Co-starring Gemini Ganesan for the third time and B. Saroja Devi for the second time, the film was based on Kalki Krishnamurthy's 1942 novel with the same name. Apart from Tamil, the film was produced in Telugu and Sinhala languages. Upon release the film met with positive response from the critics and was awarded the National Film Award for Best Feature Film in Tamil at the 8th National Film Awards. However, the film did not fare well at the box office, but Vyjayanthimala's performance was appreciated by critics. She also acted opposite M. G. Ramachandran for the first time in Baghdad Thirudan. Meanwhile, she did a Hindi film titled College Girl opposite Shammi Kapoor, which fared average at the box office and was declared as the eighteenth highest-grossing film of the year.

Following successful re-entry in Tamil cinema, Vyjayanthimala then signed Dilip Kumar's home production film Gunga Jumna. Having been inspired by the 1934 Manhattan Melodrama, the film was one of the first Hindi films to deal with the theme based on two brothers on opposite sides of law. Directed by Nitin Bose, she co-starred with Kumar for the fifth time after Devdas, Naya Daur, Madhumati and Paigham. In this dacoit drama, she enacted the role of Dhanno, a washerwoman who falls for childhood friend Gunga, played by Kumar and eventually killed during a gun fight. To prepare herself for that role, Vyjayanthimala had to learn the Bhojpuri, a Hindi language dialect spoken by people in East India region. She was assisted by Kumar, who chose the shade of saree that Vyjayanthimala would wear in every scene. Upon release, the film opened to widespread critical acclaim from the critics. Her performance earned her rave reviews. Dinesh Raheja from Rediff said that: "Gunga Jumna deployed several crowd-pleasing elements...most of all, an enchanting relationship between Dilip Kumar and Vyjayanthimala... Their characterisation ran so deep, which helped Dilip Kumar and Vyjayanthimala give magnetic performances. Dilip is of course a thespian, but Vyjayanthimala is a revelation"; while K. K. Rai from Stardust applauded her performance by adding "Vyjayanthimala played the village woman with such simplicity and grace; you'd forget she was one of the most glamorous stars of her time. She also spoke the Bhojpuri dialect like a native". Critics praised Vyjayanthimala for her ability to master the Bhojpuri dialect despite her South Indian upbringing. Subsequently, the film enjoyed huge success at the box office across India. At the end of its theatrical run, the film grossed around ₹ 70,000,000 with a net gross of ₹35,000,000 and a verdict of a blockbuster. The film was the Highest-grossing film of 1961, and was the third highest grossing Hindi film of the decade behind Mughal-e-Azam and Sangam, another Kumar and Vyjayanthimala starrer respectively. The film was ranked second by Boxofficeindia.co.in behind Mughal-e-Azam in their list of "Top 50 Film of Last 50 Years", which features all-time highest grossing Hindi films by using the relative price of gold in different years to arrive at a hypothetical current value of box office collections of past films for its adjustment to inflation rate. ₹7.36 billion (US$79 million). For her performance, Vyjayanthimala won her third and final Filmfare Award for Best Actress trophy at the 9th Filmfare Awards. In addition to that, she also won her first ever Bengal Film Journalists' Association Awards in the Best Actress category.

In the same year, she starred in C. V. Sridhar's Nazrana. In this remake of the highly successful 1959 Tamil film Kalyana Parisu, again directed by Sridhar, she acted alongside Raj Kapoor for the first time. She played the role of Vasanthi, wherein she replaced actress B. Saroja Devi who did not reprise her role from Kadhal Parisu and its Telugu remake Pelli Kanuka. The triangular love story received an average run at cinemas and ended up as the twelfth highest-grossing film of that year. The same year she did another film with Sridhar. Being the first Tamil film to be shot in Jammu and Kashmir, she acted alongside Gemini Ganesan after a long gap after Then Nilavu. The film and the soundtrack were widely appreciated by the audience, where it was a huge success. The film was followed by J. Om Prakash's Aas Ka Panchhi with Rajendra Kumar. For her portrayal, Vyjayanthimala got some negative feedback from the critics; The Hindu review said that: "Even the otherwise powerhouse of talent, Vyjayantimala, with many a sterling performance under her belt, barely passes muster, despite the usual dance and song sequence to showcase her formidable prowess as an accomplished dancer thrown in". Despite some mixed reviews, the film was labelled as a hit at the box office and was declared the fourth highest-grossing film of 1961 where it had a silver jubilee run at the theatres. Her career then struggled again with some box office duds in the following year. In 1962, she co-starred with Manoj Kumar in Dr. Vidya, which performed average at the box office. In 1963, she co-starred with Sivaji Ganesan in the Historical fiction Chittoor Rani Padmini. Written by C. V. Sridhar and directed by Chitrapu Narayana Rao, the film proved to be a box office failure, however, her performance was critically acclaimed. The same year Bimal Roy who earlier worked with her in Devdas and Madhumati offered her the lead role in Bandini opposite Ashok Kumar and Dharmendra. However, Vyjayanthimala could not accept the role due to her busy schedule. Boxofficeindia.com ranked Vyjayanthimala at the top spot in their list of "Top Three Successful Box Office Actress" of 1962 and 1963 respectively, despite her box office failures.

Following a two-year sabbatical, Vyjayanthimala re-attained her success in Hindi films through Raj Kapoor's first technicolor film Sangam. Termed as Kapoor's magnum opus, the film was produced with a lavish budget by his production company R. K. Films. Earlier in the 1940s, Kapoor planned to launch Sangam in the title of Gharonda with Dilip Kumar, Nargis and himself in the lead, however the film was delayed several times until 1962. Following Kumar and Dev Anand's refusal to be a part of the film, Kapoor then signed Rajendra Kumar and himself as the male leads. Sangam was the first Indian film shot in Europe and outside of Asia. It was the longest running film in India when it was released at 238 minutes. The film also created a record by being the first film to have two intervals during theatrical screenings. With cinematography by Radhu Kamarkar, the European filming locations include Venice, Paris, Switzerland and London, while the Indian locations include Ooty and Kashmir Valley. Upon release, the film was received widespread critical acclaim and was considered as Hindi cinema's greatest love triangle. Vyjayanthimala's performance too received high praise from critics. Dinesh Raheja of Rediff said that: "to put it simply, radiant...the maturity with which she tackles her character, the insouciance as well as the agony" and called it "one of commercial cinema's most unforgettable performances". Similarly, the film was commercially successful throughout India and other countries as well. On its overall theatrical run, Boxofficeindia.com reported that the film had grossed ₹ 8,00,00,000 and netted around ₹40,000,000 with its adjusted to inflation net gross about ₹843,900,000 (US$9.0 million). Subsequently, the film was labelled as a blockbuster, where it was ranked as highest-grossing film of 1964 and the second highest-grossing film of the decade. The film was ranked at fourth by Boxofficeindia.co.in in their list of "Top 50 Film of Last 50 Years" which feature all-time highest grossing Hindi film with its adjusted to inflation gross about ₹7,173,154,362 (US$77 million). Sangam also had a great box office run outside of India where it was well received in countries such as China, Malaysia and Russia. For her role of Radha, a woman in a dilemma about her feelings for her husband and her former lover, Vyjayanthimala was awarded with the Filmfare Award for Best Actress. She then co-starred with Dilip Kumar for the sixth time in Ram Mukherjee's Leader. The film was a comeback film for Kumar, whose last film was Gunga Jumna, also co-starred Vyjayanthimala. Like most of Vyjayanthimala and Kumar's films, their on-screen chemistry received praise from critics, where Deepak Mahan from The Hindu said: "What made the film even more enjoyable was the equally spirited response of doe-eyed Vyjayantimala, oozing oodles of impish charm in every frame. The pair carried the film on their shoulders, giving abundant joy and mirth to audiences with their outstanding histrionics. Their interactions make the film worth going miles to watch and it is certain that without their resolute shoulders". However, the film Leader did not fare well at the box office, where it was labelled as below average. During the making of Leader, Rediff describes Vyjayanthimala as "recalcitrant" which annoyed Kumar. The film was followed by Gemini Film's Zindagi, directed by Ramanand Sagar. A female-centric film, it features Vyjayanthimala alongside Rajendra Kumar, Raaj Kumar and Prithviraj Kapoor. Zindagi became a success at the box office, where it celebrated a silver jubilee theatrical run and was the fourth highest-grossing film of that year with a verdict of "hit". Soon she signed for Anjali Pictures' Phoolon Ki Sej, with Ashok Kumar and Manoj Kumar, and this became her third consecutive hit of the year. Her last release in 1964 was Ishaara, in which she co-starred with actor Joy Mukherjee for the first time, and her performance ensured that the film was a box office success.

=== 1965–1970: Later successes and retirement ===
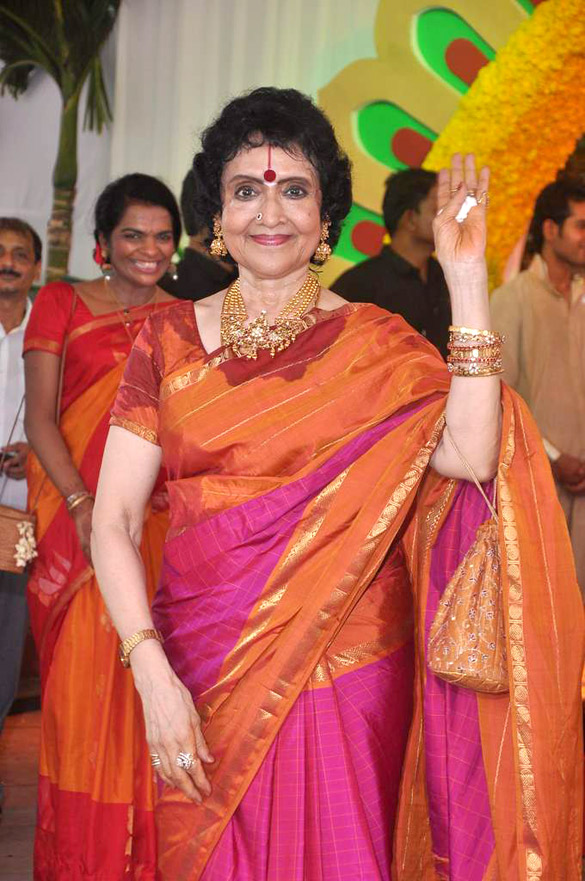
Vyjayanthimala in 2012

In 1965, Vyjayanthimala starred in two commercial disappointments; Naya Kanoon, with Ashok Kumar and Bharat Bhushan and Nam Iruvar with T. R. Mahalingam, but both the films are considered masterpieces by critics. Naam Iruvar became her last Tamil film. In 1966, Vyjayanthimala starred in Do Dilon Ki Dastaan, which failed at the box office. After some box office flops, Vyjayanthimala soon signed alongside Rajendra Kumar in the swashbuckler ruritanian romance Suraj. Directed by T. Prakash Rao, the film had Mumtaz, Bharathi Vishnuvardhan and Neetu Singh. Suraj was huge box office success and was one of the popular costume dramas in Hindi cinema. Suraj was the last successful film of Rajendra Kumar and Shankar Jaikishan, who introduced singer Sharda through this film. According to Boxofficeindia.com, the film grossed around ₹ 50,000,000 with net gross of ₹ 25,000,000 and becomes second highest-grossing film of 1966 with a verdict of "super hit" at the box office. The film was also the thirteenth highest-grossing film of the decade, with its adjusted to inflation net gross about ₹511,800,000 (US$5.5 million). While Ibosnetwork.com reported that the film grossed ₹ 40,000,000 and its adjusted to inflation gross about ₹504,260,000 (US$5.4 million). Following Suraj, Vyjayanthimala starred in the historical film Amrapali. Based on life of the Nagarvadhu (royal courtesan) of Vaishali Amrapali, she played the title role along with Sunil Dutt, who enacted the role of King Ajatashatru. Upon release, the film opened to widespread critical acclaim and was India's official submission for Academy Award for Best Foreign Language Film at the 39th Academy Awards but failed at the box-office, which left Vyjayanthimala heartbroken, where she decided to quit the industry, though director Baldev Raj Chopra felt that she could have easily continued for another decade in lead roles. After Amrapali, the biggest box office failure of her career and some personal issues with co-stars, Vyjayanthimala lost interest in films. In 1967, she was signed into Tapi Chanakya's Ram Aur Shyam, which was a remake of the 1964 Telugu film Ramudu Bheemudu. She co-starred with Dilip Kumar for the seventh time, who had previously made some memorable films with her. However, due to some misunderstandings between Kumar and Vyjayanthimala, Vyjayanthimala was replaced by Waheeda Rehman. The same year, she starred in Vijay Anand's Jewel Thief after Saira Banu backed out of the project due to her marriage with Dilip Kumar. The crime thriller reunited Vyjayanthimala with her co-star Dev Anand after Amar Deep (1958). Jewel Thief also had Ashok Kumar as the main antagonist with four more female leads Tanuja, Helen, Anju Mahendru and Faryal. For the first time she worked under Dev Anand's production house, Navketan Films after being rejected by Tad Danielewski for the lead role in the 1965 Hindi film Guide. The success of Jewel Thief made Vyjayanthimala and Dev Anand a hit pair. Three decades later, Vyjayanthimala was approached by Dev Anand for a role in the sequel of Jewel Thief; Return of Jewel Thief (1996), but she refused to act in the film as she did not plan to make a comeback. Subsequently, Vyjayanthimala's dance number "Hothon Pe Aisi Baat Main" sung by Lata Mangeshkar became a huge hit and was considered one of the best dance numbers in Indian cinema, while being influential for the rises of other dance numbers such as "Chamma Chamma" from China Gate and "Sheila Ki Jawani" from Tees Maar Khan respectively. The same year she did the magnum opus Chhoti Si Mulaqat, produced by the legendary Bengali actor and matinee idol Mahanayak Uttam Kumar. A remake of the 1954 Bengali film Agni Pariksha, which had Uttam Kumar, who reprises his role in the Hindi version and Suchitra Sen in the lead. Unlike the original version, Chhoti Si Mulaqat failed at the box office and was declared a box office disaster. Her last release in the year was Hatey Bazarey, with Ashok Kumar. Inspired by Banaphool's novel with the same title, the film was directed by acclaimed director Tapan Sinha, where Vyjayanthimala made her Bengali cinema debut through the film. She played the role of a widowed young woman – Chhipli – who falls for a civil surgeon Doctor Anandi Mukheerjee. Upon release the film received unanimously positive reviews, where it was awarded the Best Feature Film Award at the 15th National Film Awards, while Vyjayanthimala's performance was also appreciated by critics alike. A review from Upperstall had mentioned that: "Vyjayantimala, in her debut in Bengali films is extremely convincing as the independent and vivacious tribal widow". Similarly, her singing in the song "Shyam Tor Tore Tamal Tolay Boshe Thaki" along with singer Hemanta Mukherjee received praise, where it was described as a "pleasant surprise" in the same review. Hatey Bazarey was also received well commercially and was one of the most successful Bengali films of the 1960s.

In 1968, Vyjayanthimala appeared in three big budget films with high-profile actors such as Dilip Kumar, Dev Anand and Rajendra Kumar. Her first release of the year was Sunghursh, directed by Harnam Singh Rawail. She co-starred with Dilip Kumar for the seventh and final time in her career, with Balraj Sahni and Sanjeev Kumar in key roles. Originally offered to actress Sadhana, the role later went to Vyjayanthimala as the former suffered with her thyroid problem. Reportedly she did not exchange a word with Kumar while filming, since their relationship broke up. For Vyjayanthimala's enactment of a courtesan, Laila-e-Aasma, she received positive feedback from the critics. Anuj Kumar from The Hindu said that: "Vyjayanthimala is graceful as ever. In a film dominated by men, Rawail made sure she had a substantial role. Her dances and Naushad's lilting tunes come as a welcome break to the sinewy tone imparted by Abrar Alvi and Gulzar's dialogues". The role fetched her the Best Hindi Actress Award at 25th Bengal Film Journalists' Association Awards. Sunghursh was followed by Saathi, directed by C. V. Sridhar. A remake of the highly acclaimed Tamil film of 1961, Palum Pazhamum, the film had Rajendra Kumar and Simi Garewal replacing Sivaji Ganesan and Sowcar Janaki respectively from the Tamil version with Vyjyanthimala enacting the role originally portrayed by B. Saroja Devi. The same year she co-starred with Dev Anand for the third and last time in T. Prakash Rao's Duniya. Duniya, Saathi and Sunghursh were named as tenth, eleventh and twelfth highest-grossing film of 1968 respectively, with the first two labelled as average while the latter only managed to do above average business at the box office. On the other hand, Duniya is considered a hit film by some critics and often included in the hit film list of Dev Anand. In 1969, she was the first Indian dancer to perform at the United Nations General Assembly to commemorate the 21st anniversary of the proclamation of the Universal Declaration of Human Rights.

After her retirement from films, Vyjayanthimala was offered many roles by big banners opposite leading actors of that time. But she refused all those offers as she did not want to make a comeback. In 1968, she was signed opposite Raj Kapoor in Mahesh Kaul's Sapno Ka Saudagar, she refused the role which went to the debutante Hema Malini, who become one of the most popular actresses in Hindi films later. However, in 1975, Vyjayanthimala was almost signed in Gulzar's Aandhi with Sanjeev Kumar but she backed out from the project as the role resembled Indira Gandhi's personal life. Perhaps the most famous role that Vyjayanthimala ever turned down was the 1975 crime-drama film Deewaar. Inspired by the 1961 film Gunga Jumna, a Vyjayanthimala starrer, the film was directed by Yash Chopra and stars Amitabh Bachchan and Shashi Kapoor. She turned down the role of a mother for the lead actors, which later went to Nirupa Roy, who attained popularity through the success of the film and was later cast in similar roles. Following that, she refused the multi-starrer 1981 blockbuster film Kranti, opposite Dilip Kumar, with Manoj Kumar, Shashi Kapoor, Hema Malini, Shatrughan Sinha, Parveen Babi and Sarika as the ensemble cast, which was directed and produced by Manoj Kumar himself. Apart from Hindi films, she refused the 1989 Tamil film Mappillai, starring Rajinikanth. As said by Rajinikanth who played the lead role, "actor Vyjayanthimala was first offered the role of mother-in-law in Mappillai which was a pivotal role, but she refused the film even though the producer of the film Chiranjeevi came forward to give her huge salary, she said that she does not want to play the role of antagonist opposite me and will never agree to be part of fighting scene against me". Following many films refused by Vyjayanthimala, Dinesh Raheja from Rediff commented that "good money and pivotal roles notwithstanding...did not seem alluring enough". All her films released from 1969; Pyar Hi Pyar, Prince and Ganwaar, became huge box office successes. Ganwaar was her last Hindi film.

== Political career ==
Vyjayanthimala's political career was initiated in 1984 when she contested in 1984 Tamil Nadu general election for the South Chennai constituency as the nominee of the Indian National Congress opposite Era Sezhiyan, the leader of Janata Party and seasoned parliamentarian. During the campaign, Sezhiyan made provoking quotes such as "Send me to the Lok Sabha. Send her to R.R. Sabha (an organisation promoting fine arts)" to defeat Vyjayanthimala, ironically she won the election with margin of about 48,000 votes where she gained 313,848 with percentage of 51.92%. Subsequently, she debuted in the Lok Sabha, the directly elected lower house of the Parliament of India by the end of January 1985 with Amitabh Bachchan.

In 1989, Vyjayanthimala again had to face the 1989 Tamil Nadu general election, this time she was opposed by Aladi Aruna of the Dravida Munnetra Kazhagam. She again beat her opposition by nearly 12584 votes. Later in 1993, she was nominated to the Rajya Sabha, the upper house of the Parliament of India for a six-year term. In 1999, she resigned from the primary membership of the Indian National Congress party. In her letter to the party's president Sonia Gandhi, she included the reason for her resignation where she said that: "painfully watching the party drifting from its avowed principles after the death of Rajiv Gandhi, the party has lost touch with its grassroots and one can see day in and day out that sincere party workers are being steadily ignored." she adds more; "increasingly difficult to justify ourselves to the public and my conscience does not allow me to stay in the party any longer". Later, she joined the Bharatiya Janata Party on 6 September 1999.

== Legacy ==
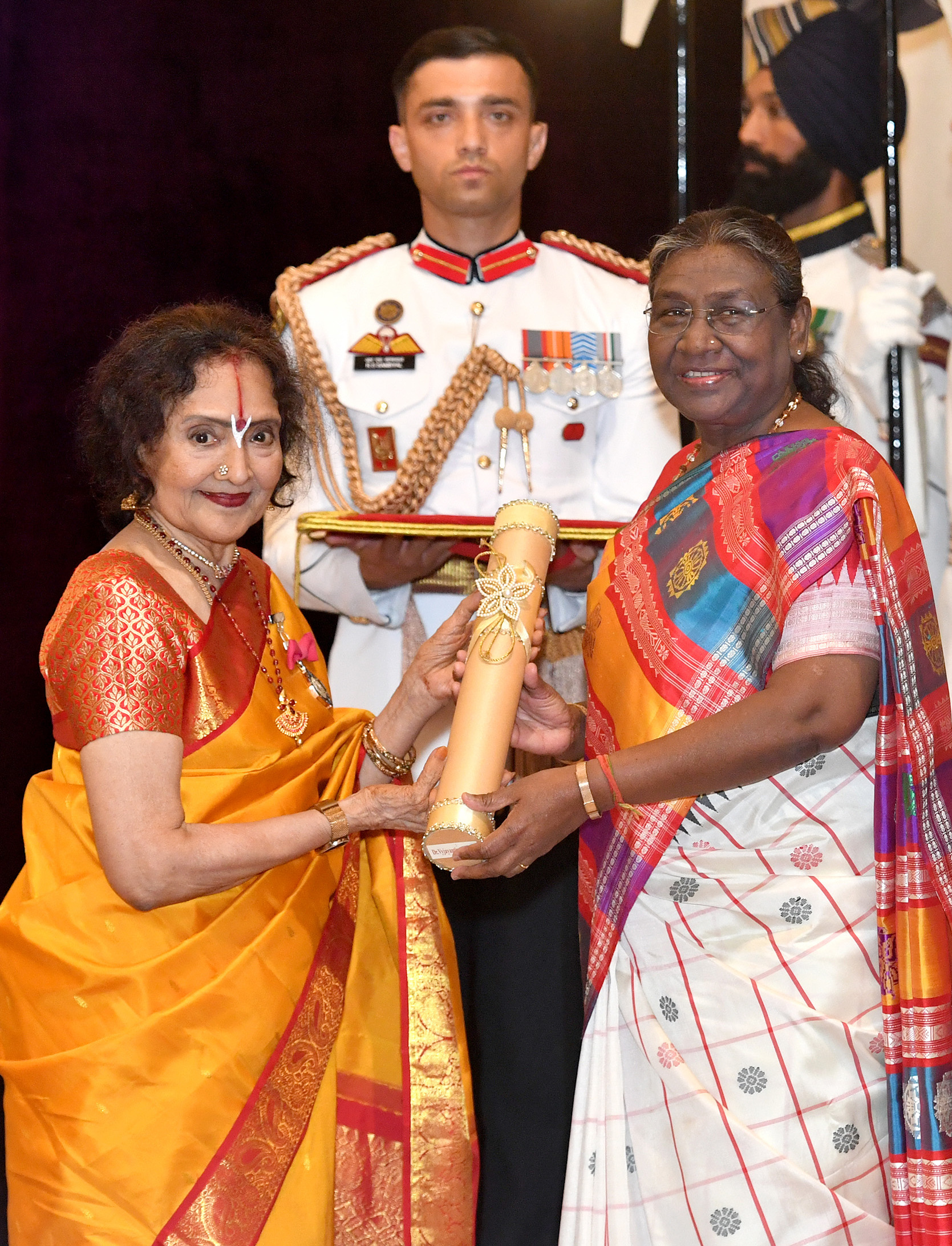
Vyjayanthimala receiving Padma Vibhushan Award from president Droupadi Murmu

Vyjayanthimala is regarded as the greatest actresses of Indian cinema. In 2022, she was placed in Outlook India's "75 Best Bollywood Actresses" list. One of the highest paid actress of the 1950s and 1960s, Vyjayanthimala appeared in Box Office India's "Top Actresses" list from 1954 to 1967, and topped the list for six years (1958–1959, 1961–1964). Arushi Jain of The Indian Express called her the "first female superstar" of the Indian cinema and added that she ruled three industries, being the first "pan-India" star. In 2007, Vyjayanthimala released her memoir, titled, "Bonding... A Memoir".

== See also ==
- List of Indian film actresses
- List of South Indian film families
- List of Indian women in dance
- List of actors who have played multiple roles in the same film
