= Nagin (1954 film) =

- Theatrical release poster
- Directed by: Nandlal Jaswantlal
- Written by: Rajendra Krishan
- Screenplay by: Hameed Butt
- Story by: Bijon Bhattacharya
- Produced by: S. Mukherjee
- Starring: Vyjayanthimala; Pradeep Kumar; Jeevan
- Cinematography: Fali Mistry
- Edited by: Babu Lavande
- Music by: Hemant Kumar
- Production company: Filmistan Ltd.
- Distributed by: Filmistan Ltd.
- Release date: 5 March 1954
- Running time: 139 minutes
- Country: India
- Language: Hindi

Nagin is a 1954 Indian Hindi-language romantic drama film, directed by Nandlal Jaswantlal, and written by Rajendra Krishan, Hameed Butt and Bijon Bhattacharya. It stars Vyjayanthimala and Pradeep Kumar, and has a hit musical score by Hemant Kumar. This film was partly produced in Technicolor.

The film was a blockbuster and the highest-grossing film of 1954. Moreover, it established the career of Vyjayanthimala in the Hindi film industry.

== Synopsis ==
Two Adivasi tribes (Nagi & Ragi) are in conflict over the local economic rights. The daughter of the Nagi tribe's chief, Mala (Vyjayanthimala), vows to kill the son of the Ragi tribe's chief, Sanatan (Pradeep Kumar), as revenge. Trespassing in the enemy territory, she is mesmerized by the music of a flute (played by the musician Kalyanji Virji Shah). Coming closer, she finds out that the player is Sanatan. They fall in love, but find it difficult to appease the enmity between the two tribes and to resist the attempts of the villain Prabir (Jeevan) to marry Mala.

== Cast ==
- Vyjayanthimala... Mala
- Pradeep Kumar... Sanatan
- Jeevan... Prabir
- Mubarak... Dhopal - The Nagi Chieftain
- Ruby Mayer... Mala's Mother (as Sulochana)
- I. S. Johar
- Krishna Kumari (Hindi Actress)
- Hiralal

== Soundtrack ==
The film's soundtrack was composed by Hemant Kumar. It included thirteen tracks, including the hit "Man Dole Mera Tan Dole", whose "Been music" was performed by Kalyanji on the clavioline and by Ravi on the harmonium (both once worked under Hemant Kumar's direction and later became independent music directors). It was released under E.P. and L.P. gramophone records by The Gramophone Company of India, now known as Saregama. The lyrics were written by Rajendra Krishan.

No.	Title	Artist(s)	Raga
1	"Been Music"	Kalyanji, Ravi	
2	"Man Dole Mera Tan Dole"	Lata Mangeshkar	
3	"Tere Dwar Khada Ek Jogi"	Hemant Kumar	
4	"Sun Rasiya Man Bhasiya"	Lata Mangeshkar	
5	"Yaad Rakhna Pyar Ki Nishani"	Hemant Kumar, Asha Bhosle, Chorus	
6	"Sun Ri Sakhi"	Lata Mangeshkar, Chorus	Pahadi
7	"Mera Dil Ye Pukare Aaja"	Lata Mangeshkar	Kirwani
8	"Jadugar Saiyan"	Lata Mangeshkar	
9	"Ari Chhod De Patang"	Lata Mangeshkar, Hemant Kumar	
10	"Mera Badli Mein Chhup Gaya Chand"	Lata Mangeshkar	
11	"O Zindagi Ke Denewale"	Hemant Kumar, Chorus	
12	"Teri Yaad Mein Jalkar Dekh Liya"	Lata Mangeshkar	
13	"Oonchi Oonchi Duniya Ki Deewarein"	Lata Mangeshkar	
