= List of Tamil films of 1969 =

Post-amendment to the Tamil Nadu Entertainments Tax Act 1939 on 1 April 1958, Gross jumped to 140 per cent of Nett. Commercial Taxes Department reported ₹7.77 crore in entertainment tax revenue for the year.

The following is a list of films produced in the Tamil film industry in India in 1969, in alphabetical order.

== 1969 ==
Title	Director	Production	Music	Cast
Adimai Penn	K. Shankar	Em. Gee. Yar. Pictures	K. V. Mahadevan	M. G. Ramachandran, Jayalalitha, J. P. Chandrababu, Cho, Rajasree, Pandari Bai
Aindhu Laksham	G. Ramakrishnan	Sudha Movies	S. M. Subbaiah Naidu	Gemini Ganesan, B. Saroja Devi, Cho, Shylashri, Manorama, Thengai Srinivasan, Sachu
Akka Thangai	M. A. Thirumugam	Dhandayuthapani Films	Shankar–Ganesh	Jaishankar, K. R. Vijaya, Sowcar Janaki, Nagesh, Major Sundarrajan, M. Bhanumathi
Anbalippu	A. C. Tirulokchandar	Kamala Movies	M. S. Viswanathan	Sivaji Ganesan, Jaishankar, B. Saroja Devi, Vijaya Nirmala, Nagesh, T. R. Ramachandran, Sachu
Anjal Petti 520	T. N. Balu	Bharath Movies	R. Govardhanam	Sivaji Ganesan, B. Saroja Devi, Nagesh, Thangavelu, Nambiar, Thengai Seenivasan
Annaiyum Pithavum	Krishnan–Panju	AVM Productions	M. S. Viswanathan	A. V. M. Rajan, Vanisri, Sivakumar, Lakshmi, Cho, Manorama, M. Bhanumathi
Athai Magal	T. R. Ramanna	Dhanabhagyam Pictures	M. S. Viswanathan	Jaishankar, Vanisri, Nagesh, C. L. Anandan, Suruli Rajan, Kumari Padmini, Pakoda Kadhar, Shylashri
Avare En Deivam	C. N. Shanmugam	Meenakshi Sundareswar Films	T. R. Pappa	Gemini Ganesan, Rajasree, C. R. Vijayakumari, R. Muthuraman
Aayiram Poi	V. Srinivasan	Vidhya Movies	V. Kumar	Jaishankar, Vanisri, Cho, Manorama, Thengai Seenivasan, M. R. R. Vasu
Captain Ranjan	T. P. Sundaram	Film Land Productions	G. Ramanathan, Vedha	Ranjan, Vanaja
Chella Penn	K. Krishnamurthy	K. K. Films	B. A. Chidambaranathan	Ravichandran, Kanchana, Nagesh
Deiva Magan	A. C. Tirulokchandar	Shanthi Films	M. S. Viswanathan	Sivaji Ganesan, Jayalalitha, Pandari Bai, Vijayasree, Nagesh
Gurudhakshaneiy	A. P. Nagarajan	Sri Gajalakshmi Films	Pukazhenthi	Sivaji Ganesan, Padmini, Jayalalitha, K. Balaji, Balaiah, Thangavelu,
Iru Kodugal	K. Balachander	Kalakendra Movies	V. Kumar	Gemini Ganesan, Sowcar Janaki, Jayanthi, Nagesh
Kanne Pappa	P. Madhavan	Muthuvel Movies	M. S. Viswanathan	K. R. Vijaya, R. Muthuraman, 'Baby' Rani, C. R. Vijayakumari, M. N. Nambiar, J. P. Chandrababu, Manorama
Kanni Penn	A. Kasilingam	Sathya Movies	M. S. Viswanathan	Jaishankar, Vanisri, Sivakumar, Lakshmi, Vennira Aadai Nirmala, Cho
Kaaval Dheivam	K. Vijayan	Ambaal Production	G. Devarajan	Sivaji Ganesan, Sowcar Janaki, Sivakumar, Lakshmi, Muthuraman, Nagesh
Kulavilakku	K. S. Gopalakrishnan	Amar Jothi Movies	K. V. Mahadevan	Gemini Ganesan, B. Saroja Devi, Nagesh, S. V. Ranga Rao, Rajasulochana, Vijayasree, Sachu
Kuzhandai Ullam	Savitri	Sri Savitri Productions	S. P. Kodandapani	Gemini Ganesan, Sowcar Janaki, Vanisri, Thengai Srinivasan, Rama Prabha, V. K. Ramasamy
Magane Nee Vazhga	M. Krishnan	Subalakshmi Pictures	T. R. Pappa	Jaishankar, Lakshmi, Anjali Devi, Nagesh, Vijaya Kumari,
Mahizampoo	V. T. Arasu	Shasti Films	D. B. Ramachandran	A. V. M. Rajan, Pushpalatha, Cho, Manorama, Sundarrajan, V. S. Raghavan, Manohar
Manaivi	G. K. Ramu	Navamani Pictures	K. V. Mahadevan	Gemini Ganesan, C. R. Vijayakumari, Nagesh, Rama Prabha, Rajeshri. Asogan, V. S. Raghavan
Manasatchi	T. N. Balu	Vijaya Balaji Movies	Vedha	Jaishankar, Vanisri, Nagesh, Sundarrajan, Surulirajan, O. A. K. Devar
Mannippu	M. Krishnan	Mohan Productions	S. M. Subbaiah Naidu	Jaishankar, A. V. M. Rajan, Lakshmi, Vennira Aadai Nirmala
Naangu Killadigal	L. Balu	Modern Theatres	Vedha	Jaishankar, Bharathi, Thengai Srinivasan
Nam Naadu	C. P. Jambulingam	Vijaya International	M. S. Viswanathan	M. G. Ramachandran, Jayalalithaa, Nagesh
Nil Gavani Kadhali	C. V. Rajendran	Reena Films	M. S. Viswanathan	Jaishankar, Bharathi, Jayanthi, Nagesh, Vijaya Lalitha
Nirai Kudam	V. Srinivasan	Muktha Films	V. Kumar	Sivaji Ganesan, Vanisri, Cho, R. Muthuraman, Manorama, Thengai Srinivasan, Sachu
Odum Nadhi	Dada Mirasi	Sri Chitramahal	M. S. Viswanathan	Ravichandran, B. Saroja Devi, Nagesh, Balaiah
Paal Kudam	Pattu	Manijeh Cine Productions	M. S. Viswanathan	A. V. M. Rajan, Lakshmi, Sivakumar Pushpalatha
Pennai Vazha Vidungal	R. Devarajan	Vijaya Chithra Films	S. M. Subbaiah Naidu	Jaishankar, K. R. Vijaya, Sheela, Nagesh
Ponnu Mappillai	S. Ramanathan	P. S. V. Pictures	Vedha	Jaishankar, Kanchana, Nagesh, Tambaram Lalitha
Poova Thalaiya	K. Balachander	Arul Films	M. S. Viswanathan	Gemini Ganesan, Jaishankar, Nagesh, S. Varalakshmi, Rajasree, Vennira Aadai Nirmala
Porchilai	A. V. Francis	Agathiyam Productions	R. Govardhanam	Gemini Ganesan, C. R. Vijayakumari, Vanisri
Shanti Nilayam	G. S. Mani	Gem Movies	M. S. Viswanathan	Gemini Ganesan, Kanchana, Nagesh, Vijaya Lalitha
Singapore Seeman	M. A. V. Rajendran	Swarnalakshmi Pictures	V. Kumar	Ravichandran, Rajasree, Manorama
Sivandha Mann	C. V. Sridhar	Chithralaya	M. S. Viswanathan	Sivaji Ganesan, Kanchana, R. Muthuraman, Nagesh
Suba Dhinam	Sreekanth	Vinayaka Films	K. V. Mahadevan	R. Muthuraman, Pushpalatha, Jayabharathi, Nagesh
Thalattu	Vipindas	Thaayar Films	M. L. Srikanth	Rajapandian, Vijayasree, Pushpamala, J. P. Chandrababu, Thengai Srinivasan
Thanga Surangam	T. R. Ramanna	E. V. R. Pictures	T. K. Ramamoorthy	Sivaji Ganesan, Bharathi, Vennira Aadai Nirmala, Nagesh
Thanga Malar	D. S. Rajagopal	Ganga Productions	T. G. Lingappa	Gemini Ganesan, B. Saroja Devi, M. R. Radha, Nagesh, M. N. Nambiar, Manorama
Thirudan	A. C. Tirulokchandar	Sujatha Cine Arts	M. S. Viswanathan	Sivaji Ganesan, K. R. Vijaya, K. Balaji, Vijaya Lalitha
Thulabharam	A. Vincent	Sri Vinayaka Supriya Combines	G. Devarajan	A. V. M. Rajan, Sharada, R. Muthuraman, Kanchana
Thunaivan	M. A. Thirumugam	Dhandayuthapani Films	K. V. Mahadevan	A. V. M. Rajan, Sowcar Janaki, Nagesh, Sridevi
Ulagum Ivvalavudhan	Vedantam Raghavayya	Sri Jayalakshmi Productions	Vedha	Nagesh, Rajasree, Cho, Manorama, Sundarrajan, V. S. Raghavan, V. K. Ramasamy
Vaa Raja Vaa	A. P. Nagarajan	C. N. V. Production	Kunnakudi Vaidyanathan	Master Prabhakar, 'Baby' Sumathi, Seerkazhi Govindarajan, V. S. Raghavan, Manorama, S. N. Lakshmi
