= Rajyotsava Awards (2019) =

Awards given by the government of Karnataka, India

2019 Rajyotsava Awards
- Date: 1 November 2019
- Location: Ravindra Kalakshetra, Bangalore
- Country: India
- Presented by: Government of Karnataka
- Winners: See list

The 2019 Rajyotsava Awards ceremony took place at the Ravindra Kalakshetra on 1 November 2019. Awarded annually by the Government of Karnataka, the ceremony saw 64 individuals being awarded for achievements in various fields. The number was chosen to mark the 64th anniversary of the formation of the State of Karnataka.

== List of awardees ==
=== Individual ===
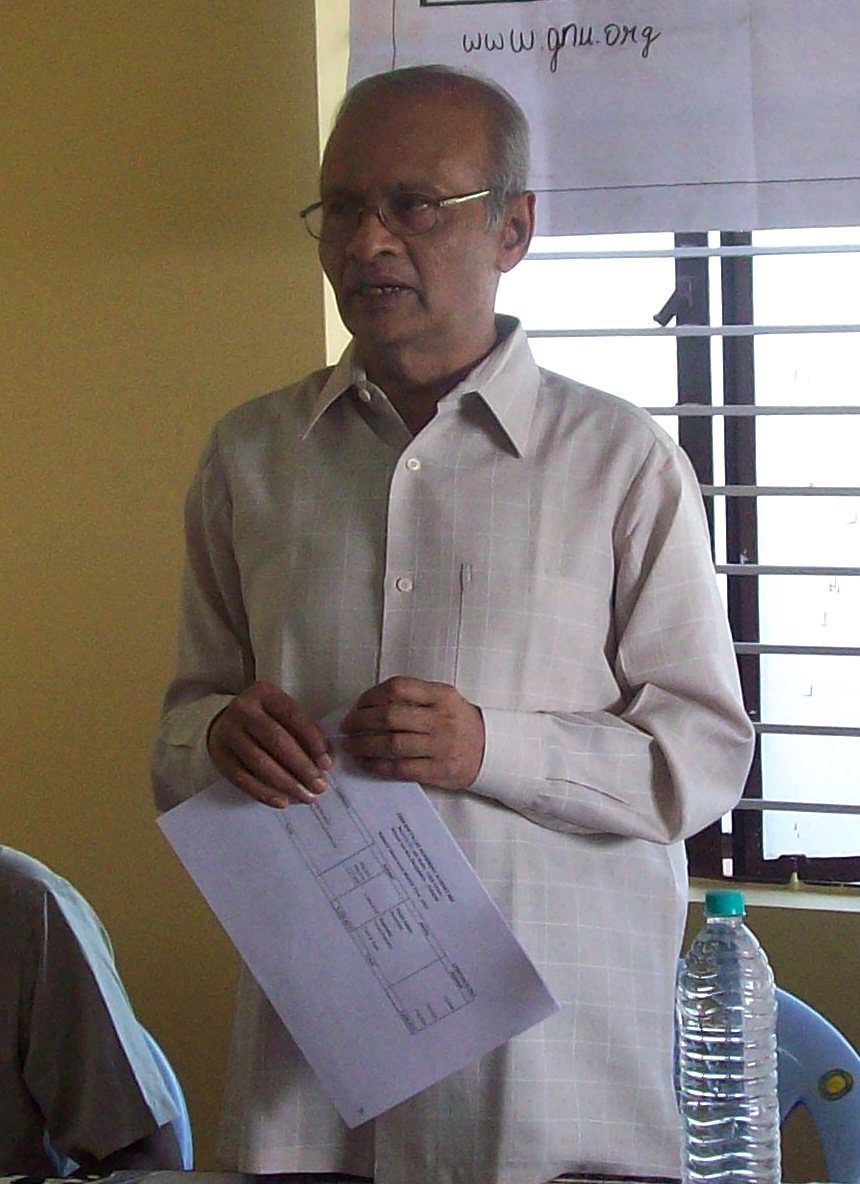
Dr. K. Chidananda Gowda, Educator

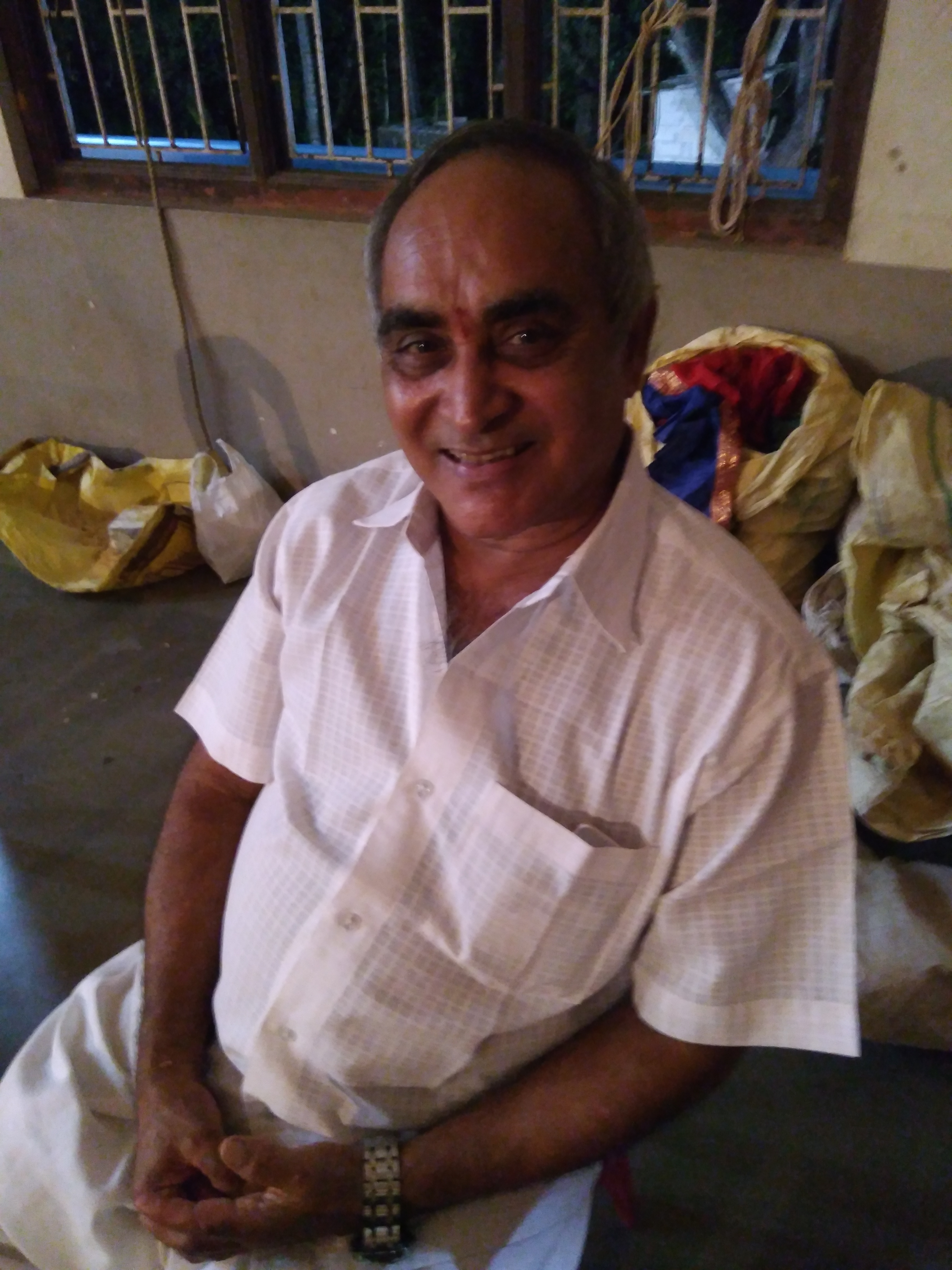
Shreedhara Bhandary, Thenkutittu artists (Yakshagana)

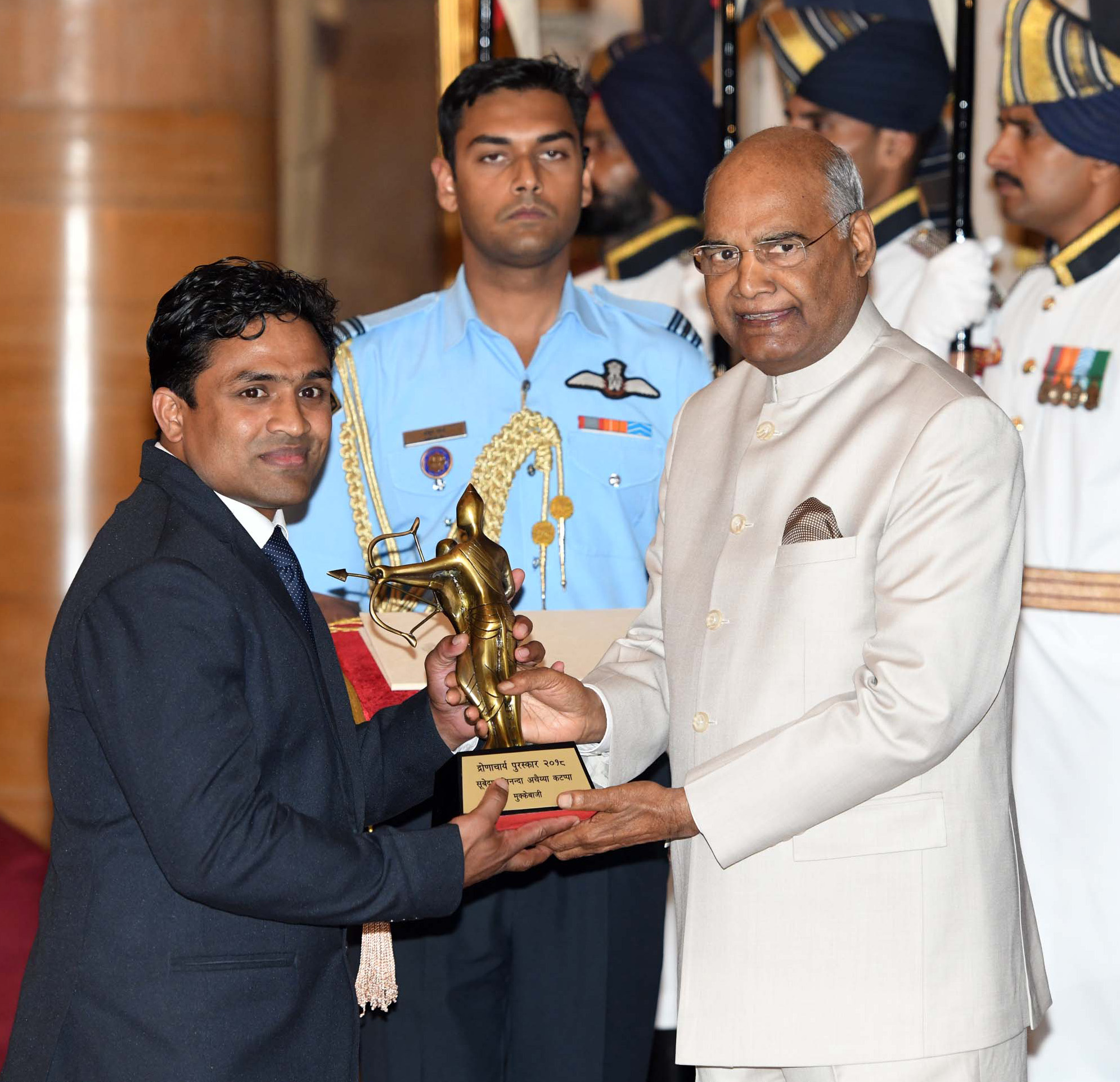
Chenanda Achaiah Kuttappa receives the Dronacharya Award from the President of India.

Awardee	Area of expertise	Highlights
Prof. S. R. Gunjal	Education	S.R.Gunjal is an accomplished Library and Information Science teacher and Information scientist. He hails from Koliwad in Dharwad District. He has authored many books related to his field as well as in Kannada. His biography titled "Library Scientist Dr. S.R. Gunjal: A Critical Biography" was written by Mallikarjun Patil.
Prof. T. Shivanna	Education	Shivanna is an economics professor and former member of the syndicate of Bangalore University. He has been felicitated and awarded for his contribution to education many times.
Dr. K. Chidananda Gowda	Education	Educationist, Author and Engineer who hails from Chokkadi, Sullia Taluk, Dakshina Kannada District. He was the former Vice-Chancellor of Kuvempu University. For his book Putanigala Vignana Padyagalu, he received the Karnataka Sahitya Academy Award in the year 1986.
Dr. Gururaj Karajagi	Education	He is a doctorate in Chemistry from Karnataka University. He is a passionate educator, author and inspirational speaker. He has published over 22 research papers in International journals. He founded the Academy for Creative Teaching, and through it supported the creation of over 86 schools high quality. He is a renowned columnist and has authored 1500 columns. His daily spiritual discourses appear on Sankara TV (over 500 programmes). His books series "Karunaalu Baa Belake" is popular. He was awarded the Nadaprabhu Kempegowda Award in 2019.
Parashuram Siddi	Theatre	
Pal Sudrashan	Theatre	
Hooli Shekhar	Theatre	
N. Shivalingaiah	Theatre	
HK Ramanath	Theatre	
Bhargavi Narayan	Theatre	Kannada Theatre artist with a career spanning 65 years. Also actress in Kannada Cinema. Her biography Naanu, Bhargavi (I am, Bhargavi), won her numerous awards including that of the Karnataka Sahitya Academy. She has written and directed plays for All India Radio. She has been awarded by the Karnataka Nataka Academy.
Chote Rahimat Khan	Music	
Nagavalli Nagaraj	Music	
Dr. Muddu Mohan	Music	
Srinivasa Udupa	Music	
Manjappa Shetty Masagali	Literature	
B Rajashekarappa	Literature	
Chandrakanth Karadalli	Literature	Children's writer and retired government teacher. Author of 25 literary works and poems for children. Nalidadu Baa Navile, Puttana Kanasu, Namma Halli Namage Chanda are some of his famous works. Awarded Sahitya Academy Award for Bala Sahitya in 2019. He hails from Shahpur town of Yadgir district.
Saraswathi Chimmalagi	Literature	
Dr. Shreedhara Bhandary	Yakshagana	An exponent of the dance form for 59 years. He learnt the fundamentals of the Yakshagana art form from his father Sheenappa Bhandary. He was subsequently a student of Kuriya Vittala Shastri and Hosahitlu Malinga Bhatta. He was a part of Yakshagana troupes Subrahmanya mela and Ballambettu mela. He is renowned for playing the roles of Abhimanyu, Babruvahana, Ganamani, Parashurama, Sreekrishna and Srinivasa.
Y Mallappa Gavayi	Bayalata	Bayalata exponent from Karnataka.
Shailashree	Films	Actor in Kannada, Tamil and Malayalam cinema with a career spanning over 5 decades. Her debut was in Malayalam film Kalanjukittiya Thankam. Her debut in Kannada was with the 1966 film Sandhya Raga directed by A. C. Narasimha Murthy. She is noted for her role in the 1971 National Award-winning film Naguva Hoovu. She also wrote the story for the film. She acted in many movies with Kannada actor R.N.Sudarshan such as Kadina Rahasya, Kallara Kalla, Malathi Madhava, among others.
Jayakumar Kodaganura	Television	
Chenanda Achaiah Kuttappa	Sports	Received the Dronacharya Award in 2018 for Boxing. India's chief boxing coach since Dec 2018. He is behind the rise of boxers Vijender Singh and Amit Panghal. Kuttappa is native of Kodagu. He is an armyman and serves as Subedar in Mysuru.
Nandita Naganagoudar	Sports	Mountaineer from Hubbali. She has completed climbing 4 of the 7 peaks in the 7 summits. She trained with the Atal Bihari Vajpayee Institute of Mountaineering. She has climbed Mt Everest in 2016, Australia's Carstensz Pyramid in 2017, Africa's Mount Kilimanjaro in 2017 and Russia's Mount Elbrus in 2018. She was given the honour of attended the recent ASEAN summit.
Vishwanatha Bhaskar Ganiga	Sports	Power lifter who hails from Kundapur in Udupi district. He won the gold medal in the Commonwealth Powerlifting championships of 2019 (Canada, Men's equipped open, 93kg) and 2017 (South Africa, Men's equipped open, 83kg). He has overall won 6 gold medals at the international level and 17 gold medals at the National level. An accident in March 2018 (leading to spinal injuries and a cracked skull) did not come in the way of winning global laurels in 2019 for this gritty power lifter.
H Khushi	Yoga	
Srimathi Vanithakka	Yoga	
Dr. Anjanappa	Medicine	
Dr. Hanumantharaya Pandit	Medicine	
Dr. Krishna Prasad K	Medicine	Dr. Krishna Prasad is a renowned ophthalmologist from Udupi. He is founder and director of Prasad Netralaya. Prasad is credited with bringing world class eye care and surgery facilities to tier 2 cities like Udupi and Mangaluru in Karnataka.
Dr. Nagarathna	Medicine	
Dr. G. T. Subhash	Medicine	
Bheemsingh Sakaram Rathod	Folk Art	
Holabasaiah Dundaiah Sambalad	Folk Art	
K R Hosalayya	Folk Art	
Kotresha Chennabasappa Kotrappanavar	Folk Art	
Neelgararu Doddagavibasappa	Folk Art	
Usman Saab Khadar Saab	Folk Art	
V. A. Deshpande	Sculpture	Vyasamurthy Ananthrao Deshpande was a sculptor born in Badami at Bagalkot district. He learnt his art from Dharwad School of Art and his sculpture from Maharaja Sayajirao University of Baroda. He was awarded scholarships by the Karnataka Lalitkala Academy and the Faculty of Fine Arts. He was the Dean of Chamarajendra Academy of Visual Arts (CAVA) in Mysuru from 2005. Some of his renowned works of sculpture are those of Babu Jagjivan Ram (9.5 feet), Sarvagna (9 feet), Rani Abbakka Devi (9 feet), Sutturu Sri Rajendra Swamiji (5.8 feet) and Kuvempu.
K. Jnaneshwar	Sculpture	Sculptor from Karnataka.
Mohan Sitnoor	Painting	Artist who hails from Gulbarga. He trained at Karnataka Chitrakala Parishath under Y. Subramanya Raju. His paintings have been featured in numerous exhibitions and galleries round the country.
Ramesh Rao	Painting	Artist who hails from Udupi and a family of artists. His work typically covers small town scenes and vignettes. He has won awards from the State Art Academies of Kerala, Karnataka and Tamil Nadu. His paintings have been displayed in numerous galleries worldwide. His work has been auctioned by Sotheby's and part of various collections. He founded the "Artists Forum" (art professionals in Karnataka) and the Drishya School of Arts in Udupi.
Saalumarada Veerachar	Environment	Veerachar is an environmentalist from Karnataka.
Shivaji Chatrappa Kagnekar	Environment	Environmentalist, Social activist and Gandhian. Since 1970 he has uplifted and transformed lives of villagers in 26 villages near forests in Khanapur, Belagavi and Hukkeri taluks of Belagavi district. His work with the people has resulted in reaching ten thousand villagers through literacy campaigns, plantation of three lakh saplings and getting Gobar gas connection for 1 lakh homes. His approach to village development is holistic, covering the spectrum of activities: Encouraging rearing cattle, creating biogas, weaning people from cutting trees, creating of tanks and water shed management, advocating organic farming, planting trees, creating sustainable incomes for farmers (gobar gas), reviving schools and ensuring youth and adult education. He has created awareness and ensured villagers volunteered and also become self sustained in village development.
B. K. Deva Rao	Agriculture	Organic farmer from Mittabagilu (near Ujire) in Dakshin Kannada district recognized for preserving and growing 155 varieties of paddy. He also grows 80 varieties of mangoes and 50 varieties of jackfruit. He is one of very few farmers who have undertaken large scale conservation of crop diversity progressively over 35 years.
Vishveshwar Sajjan	Agriculture	Organic farmer with a 6-acre farm, from Hulikere village in Koodligi taluk of Bellary district.
B V Mallikarjunaiah	Journalism	
S. G. Bharathi	Social service	
Kattige Channappa	Social service	
Navaratna Indukumar	Cottage industry	
K. V. Subramanyam	Literary critic	
Justice N. Kumar	Judiciary	Retired senior judge of the Karnataka High Court. Mr. Kumar had delivered several important judgements during his tenure as judge for 16 years. Judgements in cases related to Guidelines for appointments and recruitments through KPSC, mother-tongue in primary education, appointment of DGP Shankar Bidari, women's right over father's ancestral properties, appointment of Upa lokayukta Chandrashekaraiah, among others.
Ramesh Vaidya	Cooperatives	He was recognized for his contributions to the Cooperative sector over 35 years. Ramesh Vaidya is the National President of Sahakar Bharati, an NGO focussed on spreading and strengthening the cooperative movement in India. He received the Sahakarita Bandhu Award from IFFCO in 2017.
Gangadhar Bevinakoppa	Expats	
Jayavanth Mannoli	Expats	Kannadiga expat for contributions.
B. G. Mohandas	Expats	
K. Prakash Shetty	Other fields	Hospitality industry executive and chairman of MRG Hospitality and Infrastructure. He runs the Goldfinch boutique group of hotels across India. Prakash hails from Udupi and is known for starting Banjara the restaurant in Bengaluru.
LT. Gen. B.N.B.M. Prasad	Other fields	
N. T. Shantha Gangadhar	Other fields	
Dr. N Someshwar	Other fields	
Dr. Channaveera Shivacharya	Other fields	
Dr. Vijay Sankeshwar	Other fields	

=== Organisations/Associations ===
Sl.No	Awardee	Area of expertise	Location	Highlights
1	Sri Patanjali Yoga Shikshana Samiti		Hanumanthapura	
2	Prabhat Art International			
