= Suphan Buri (disambiguation) =

Suphan Buri (Thai: สุพรรณบุรี; literally "City of Gold") may refer to:

- Suphan Buri Province, a province of Thailand
- Mueang Suphan Buri District, the capital district of Suphan Buri Province
- Suphan Buri, a town in Suphan Buri Province
- Tha Chin River, also known as Suphan Buri River

== See also ==
- Suvarnabhumi, name of a place in ancient Indian texts
- Suvarna Bhoomi, a 1968 Indian film
