= Shylashri =

Indian actress

Shylashri is an Indian actress who acted in Kannada, Tamil, Telugu, Hindi, Malayalam, and Malay (Malaysian Launguage). She was awarded the Rajyotsava Award in 2019 for her contributions to Kannada cinema.

Shylashri is known to be one of 3 daughters of a classical musician, Veena Gnanambal, who taught music at Annamalai University.

== Career ==
Shylashri began her career with small roles in the 1964 Malyalam film Kalanjukittiya Thankam, and the 1966 Kannada film Sandhya Raga, released in 1966. With this introduction in the Kannada film industry, she has acted as heroine and a supporting actress in many Kannada movies. She is well remembered for her role in the National Award-winning Kannada film Naguva Hoovu, released in 1971 where she plays a nurse who falls in love with a doctor but sacrifices her love for a cancer patient who loves her. She also wrote the story for the film, which was produced by R.N.R. Productions. She acted as one of the heroines opposite Dr. Rajkumar in Bangarada Hoovu and Jedara Bale. She has also appeared in a few Tamil films.

== Marriage ==
She married Kannada actor R.N.Sudarshan, with whom she acted in films such as Naguva Hoovu, Kadina Rahasya, Kallara Kalla and Malathi Madhava.

== Partial filmography ==
=== Kannada ===
Year	Title	Role	Notes
1966	Sandhya Raga		
1967	Bangarada Hoovu	Latha	
1967	Manassiddare Marga		
1967	Nakkare Ade Swarga		
1967	Jaanara Jaana		
1967	Devara Gedda Manava		
1968	Jedara Bale		
1968	Bedi Bandavalu		
1968	Dhoomakethu	Guest Appearance	
1968	Mysore Tanga		
1968	Manassakshi		
1968	Manku Dinne		
1968	Lakshadeeshwara		
1968	Namma Ooru		
1969	Broker Bheeshmachari		
1969	Makkale Manege Manikya		
1969	Kaanike		
1969	Kadina Rahasya		
1969	Mathrubhoomi		
1969	Suvarna Bhoomi		
1969	Hoobisilu		
1969	Bhaagirathi		
1970	Kallara Kalla		
1970	Vagdhana		
1970	Arishina Kumkuma		
1971	Naguva Hoovu		Also Writer
1971	Malathi Madhava		
1972	Bala Panjara		
1973	Kaanada Kai		
1973	Cowboy Kulla		
1973	Bharatha Rathna		
1974	Bangaarada Panjara		
1974	Hemareddy Mallama		
1974	Maga Mommaga		
1975	Jagruthi		
1976	Maya Manushya		
1976	Mugiyada Kathe	Guest Appearance	
1978	Vamsha Jyothi		
1981	Thayiya Madilalli		
1981	Number Aidoo Ekka		
1981	Mareyada Haadu		
1984	Avala Antaranga		
1984	Sakida Sarpa		
1985	Kartavya		
1987	Shiva Bhaktha Markandeya		
2004	Bimba		
2005	Mithayi Mane		
2006	Mukha Mukhi		
2010	Super		
2012	Guru		
2014	Huccha Venkat		
2014	Vishwa Vinayaka		
2022-2023	Janani		TV Series

=== Tamil ===
Year	Film	Role
1965	Vennira Aadai	
1966	Motor Sundaram Pillai	Vimala
1967	Pandhyam	
1967	Selva Magal	
1968	Muthu Chippi	
1968	Neeyum Naanum	
1969	Athai Magal	
1969	Aayiram Poi	Latha
1969	Pennai Vazha Vidungal	
1969	Vaa Raja Vaa	
1969	Subhadhinam	
1969	Aindhu Laksham	
1970	Thirumalai Thenkumari	
1970	Dharisanam	
1970	Thabalkaran Thangai	
1971	Aathi Parasakthi	Fisherman's Wife
1972	Kurathi Magan	

=== Malayalam ===
Year	Film	Role
1964	Kalanjukittiya Thankam	
1968	Velutha Kathreena	Narthaki
1970	Nazhikakkallu	
1974	Checkpost	

=== Hindi ===
Year	Film	Role
1969	Waris	

=== Telugu ===
Year	Film	Role
1969	Bhale Abbayilu	
