= List of Rajyotsava Award recipients (1991–2000) =

Karnataka Rajyotsava Prashasti
- Civilian award
- Sponsored by: Government of Karnataka
- Formerly called: Mysore State Award (1966–1972)
- Rewards: • ₹100,000/- • Gold Medal
- First award: 1966
- Final award: 2020

Highlights
- Total awarded: 2400 (Awardees including Individuals & Institutions)

The Rajyotsava Prashasti or Rajyotsava Awards are the second highest civilian honor of Karnataka state, India. The awards are conferred annually by the Karnataka Government on the occasion of the establishment of the state on 1 November celebrated as the Kannada Rajyotsava.

The awards are presented in Bengaluru by the Chief Minister of Karnataka on 1 November of every year. Each award carries an amount of ₹100,000, a 20-gram gold medal and a citation. In addition to that, the government has in the past, allotted commercial land for eligible awardees.

== Recipients ==
Between 1991–1999 the award was given to—

Year	Recipients	Field
1991	S. R. Malagi	Literature
1991	G. Venkatasubbiah	Literature
1991	C. K. Nagaraja Rao	Literature
1991	Kirtinath Kurtakoti	Literature
1991	Chennanna Walikar	Literature
1991	Mohseen Kamaal	Literature
1991	Sudarshan Desai	Literature
1991	B. R. Vadappi	Literature
1991	Ja. Cha. Ni	Literature
1991	Kamala Hemmige	Literature
1991	Jyotsna Kamat	Literature
1991	M. M. Kalburgi	Research
1991	Mallikarjun Sindagi	Research
1991	N. T. Srinivasa Iyengar	Sanskrit
1991	V. Ram Bhat	Sanskrit
1991	M. S. Gopalakrishna	Music
1991	Rajamma A. Keshavamurthy	Music
1991	Anoor S. Ramakrishna	Music
1991	K. S. Hadapad	Music
1991	Sharanappa Basappa Pushpadatta	Music
1991	Sangameshwar Gavai	Music
1991	Shivaraj Gavai	Music
1991	Basappa Manappa Harekal	Music
1991	Narayanappa	Music
1991	Mysore Nagaraj	Music
1991	Band Subbanna	Music
1991	B. K. Sumitra	Music
1991	Kasturi Shankar	Music
1991	Wilfy Rebimbus	Music
1991	Garthikere Raghanna	Music
1991	Raghavadevi	Music
1991	Rathnamala Prakash	Music
1991	Lakshmi Keshav	Music
1991	U. S. Krishna Rao (Mangalore)	Dance
1991	Leela Ramanathan	Dance
1991	V. N. Subba Rao	Journalism
1991	K. S. Narayanaswamy	Journalism
1991	Ali Hafiz	Journalism
1991	K. L. Annigeri	Journalism
1991	Gopalakrishna	Journalism
1991	K. Raja Rao	Journalism
1991	M. S. Siddappa	Journalism
1991	V. B. Patil	Journalism
1991	B. P. R. Patil	Journalism
1991	Ballari Lalithamma	Theatre
1991	H. Dyavappa Master	Theatre
1991	Rahimanavva Kalmani	Theatre
1991	B. Chandrashekhar	Theatre
1991	Kugve Huchchappa Master	Theatre
1991	Anant Rao Joshi	Theatre
1991	Dattoba Rao Odeyar	Theatre
1991	Rama Rao Odeyar	Theatre
1991	Rajanand	Theatre
1991	K. Venkatasubbiah	Gamaka
1991	K. Ramaraya Acharya	Fine Arts
1991	Vijay Sindhur	Fine Arts
1991	S. V. Padmanabhacharya	Fine Arts
1991	G. D. Mayacharya	Fine Arts
1991	Shanmukhappa Kalappa Yarakad	Fine Arts
1991	C. V. L. Shastry	Cinema
1991	M. Pandari Bai	Cinema
1991	Bharathi Vishnuvardhan	Cinema
1991	C. V. Shivashankar	Cinema
1991	Chittani Ramachandra Hegde	Yakshagana
1991	Puttamallegowda	Folklore
1991	Mijaru Annappa	Yakshagana
1991	T. Kempahanumaiah	Folklore
1991	Lankappa Bhajantri	Folklore
1991	G. Mahantesh	Folklore
1991	Janavalli Halappa	Folklore
1991	Shivappa Govindappagowda	Folklore
1991	N. Seshagiri	Science
1991	B. M. Alur	Medicine
1991	H. B. Rajashekhar	Medicine
1991	N. Ananth	Medicine
1991	Sabnavin Sheshagiri Rao	Medicine
1991	G. Gopal	Medicine
1991	K. A. Ashok Pai	Medicine
1991	A. M. Sheikh	Medicine
1991	M. Shantarama Shetty	Medicine
1991	T. V. Mariyappa	Medicine
1991	Channabasavanna	Medicine
1991	Jagannath Rao Chandriki	Education
1991	B. S. V. Subramaniam	Education
1991	L. Lobo	Education
1991	Nagaraju	Education
1991	Keki B. Tarapore	Sports
1991	M. Mahadeva	Sports
1991	Rajan Joseph Joyal	Sports
1991	Shiny Wilson	Sports
1991	Somender Singh	Spots
1991	Dattatreya Rao Avaradi	Social Work
1991	Kollur Mallappa	Social Work
1991	N. M. Mahadevan	Social Work
1991	V. Annaiah	Social Work
1991	C. D. Jathanna	Social Work
1991	Prabhu Rao Kambalivali	Social Work
1991	Nagaraj N. Vemulkar	Social Work
1991	Sambhaji Rao L. Patil	Social Work
1991	Pampapathi	Social Work
1991	Nitin Rao Hattihal	Social Work
1991	Ghulam Abid	Social Work
1991	M. R. N. Shastry	Social Work
1991	V. Nanjappa	Social Work
1991	Usha Bapat	Social Work
1991	Channaveera Kalyanashetty	Social Work
1991	K. S. Kulkarni	Social Work
1991	Ramdas	Social Work
1991	Kodandarama Shreshti	Social Work
1991	K. Elliyanna Poojary	Social Work
1991	A. K. Lakshmi Narayana Rao	Social Work
1991	Mahaveer Chand Samadariya	Social Work
1991	Chandrashekhar B. Mantur	Social Work
1991	M. Vasudev	Social Work
1991	Suresh C. Shah	Social Work
1991	A. S. Vishwanath	Agriculture
1991	Manmohan Attavar	Agriculture
1991	K. Shivram	Kannada IAS
1991	M. R. Kamble	Kannada IAS
1991	Vijay Sasnur	Kannada IAS
1996	Belakavadi Srinivas Iyengar Jr	Carnatic Music
1996	S. Narmada	Classical dance
