= Rajyotsava Prashasti =

Second highest civilian honor of Karnataka, India

Karnataka Rajyotsava Prashasti
- Civilian award
- Awarded for: Contributions from any field to Karnataka
- Sponsored by: Government of Karnataka
- Date: 1 November 1966 (60 years ago)
- Location: Bengaluru, Karnataka
- Country: India
- Formerly called: Mysore State Award (1966–1974)
- Rewards: • ₹5,00,000/- • 20 gram Gold Medal
- First award: 1 November 1966
- Final award: 2023

Highlights
- Total awarded: 2400 (Awardees including Individuals & Institutions)

The Rajyotsava Prashasti or Rajyotsava Award is the second highest civilian honor given by the State of Karnataka in India. It is conferred annually by the Karnataka Government on the occasion of the establishment of the state on 1 November, celebrated as the Kannada Rajyotsava.

The awards are presented in Bengaluru by the Chief Minister of Karnataka on 1 November of every year. Each award carries an amount of ₹100,000, a 20-gram gold medal and a citation. In the past, the government has also allotted commercial land to eligible recipients.

== History ==
Karnataka Rajyotsava Award was instituted in 1966 to be awarded to citizens of Karnataka in recognition of their contribution in various spheres of activity including the Arts, Education, Industry, Literature, Science, Sports, Medicine, Social Service and Public Affairs. It has also been awarded to some distinguished individuals who were not citizens of Karnataka but contributed in various ways to Karnataka. The award was not conferred in 1977, 1978, 1979, 1980 and 2009.

== Award winners ==
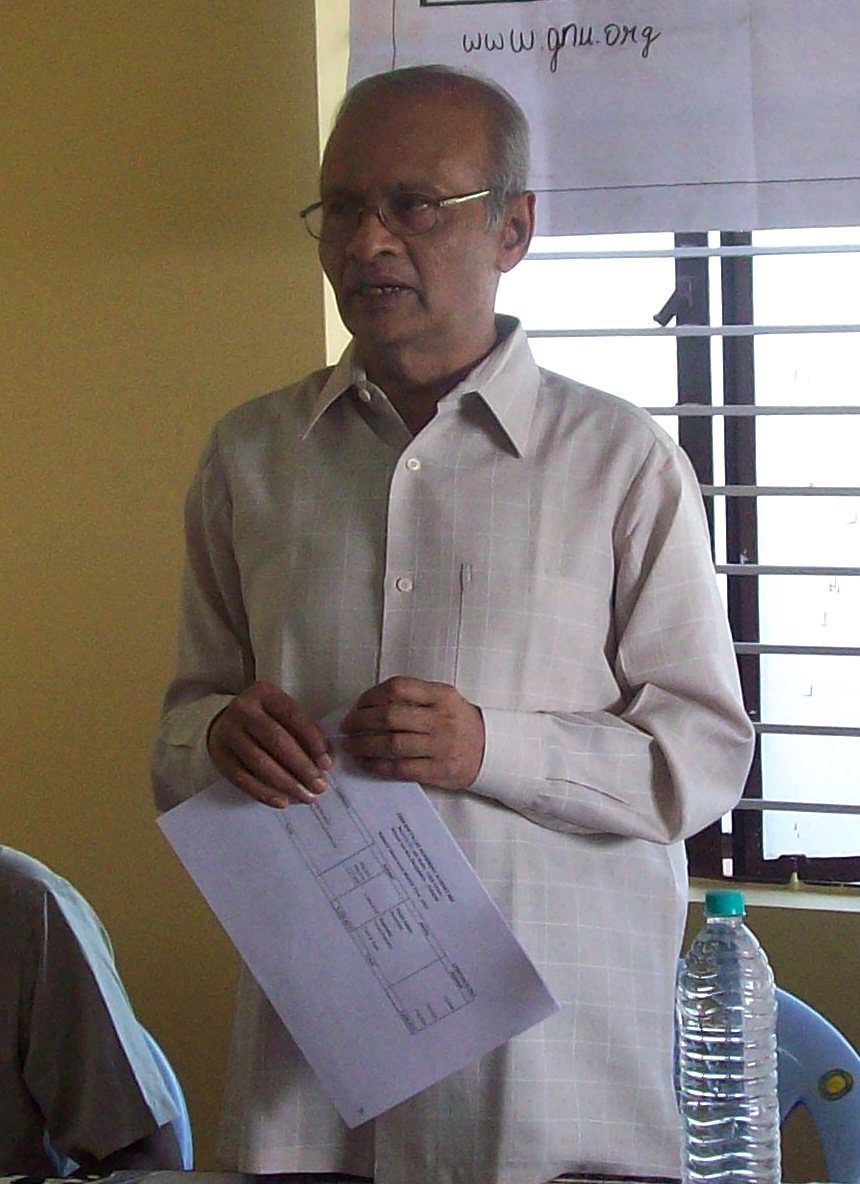
K. Chidananda Gowda, awardee in 2019, is an educationist, engineer, author and playwright.

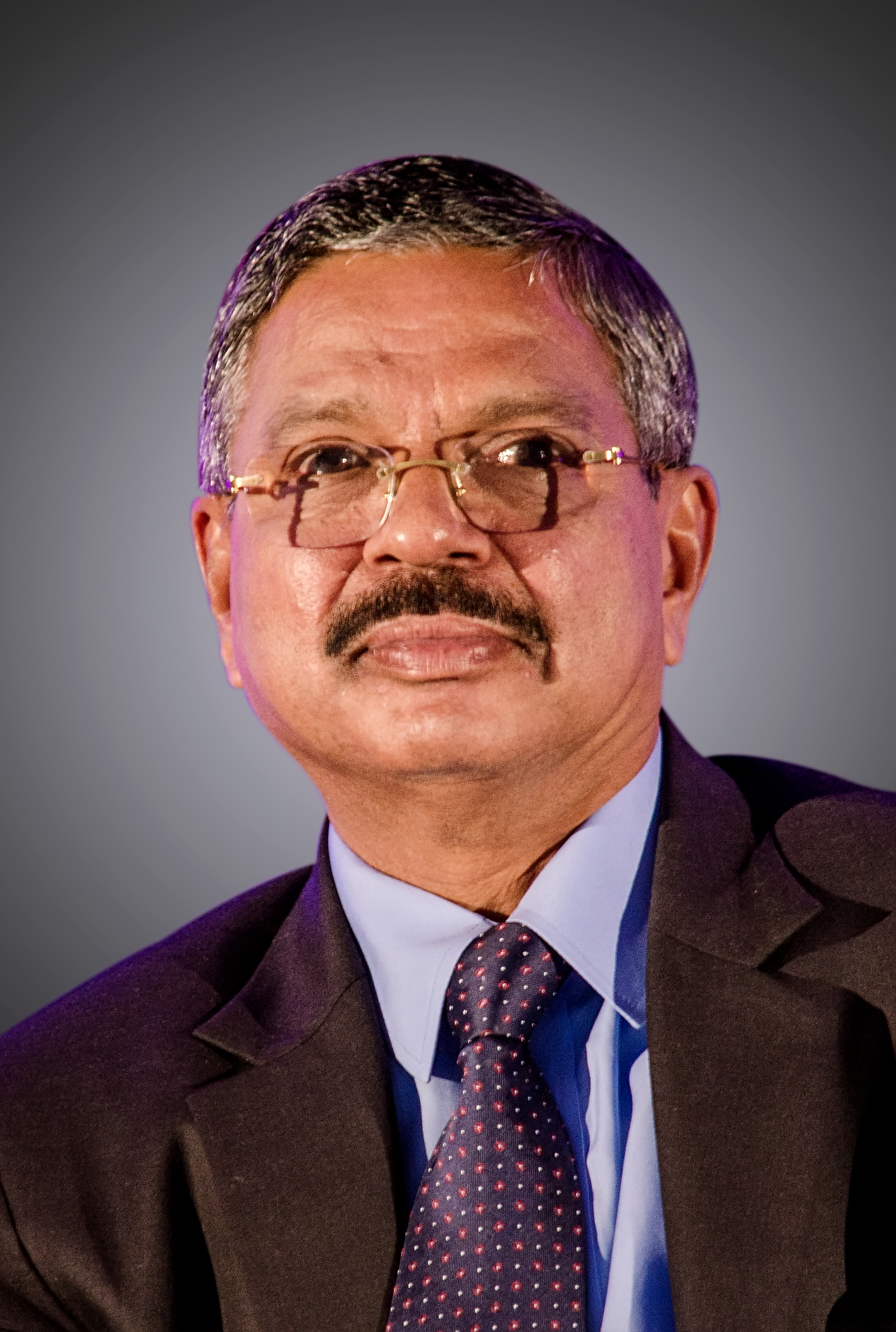
H. L. Dattu, awardee in 2017, was the 42nd Chief Justice of India.

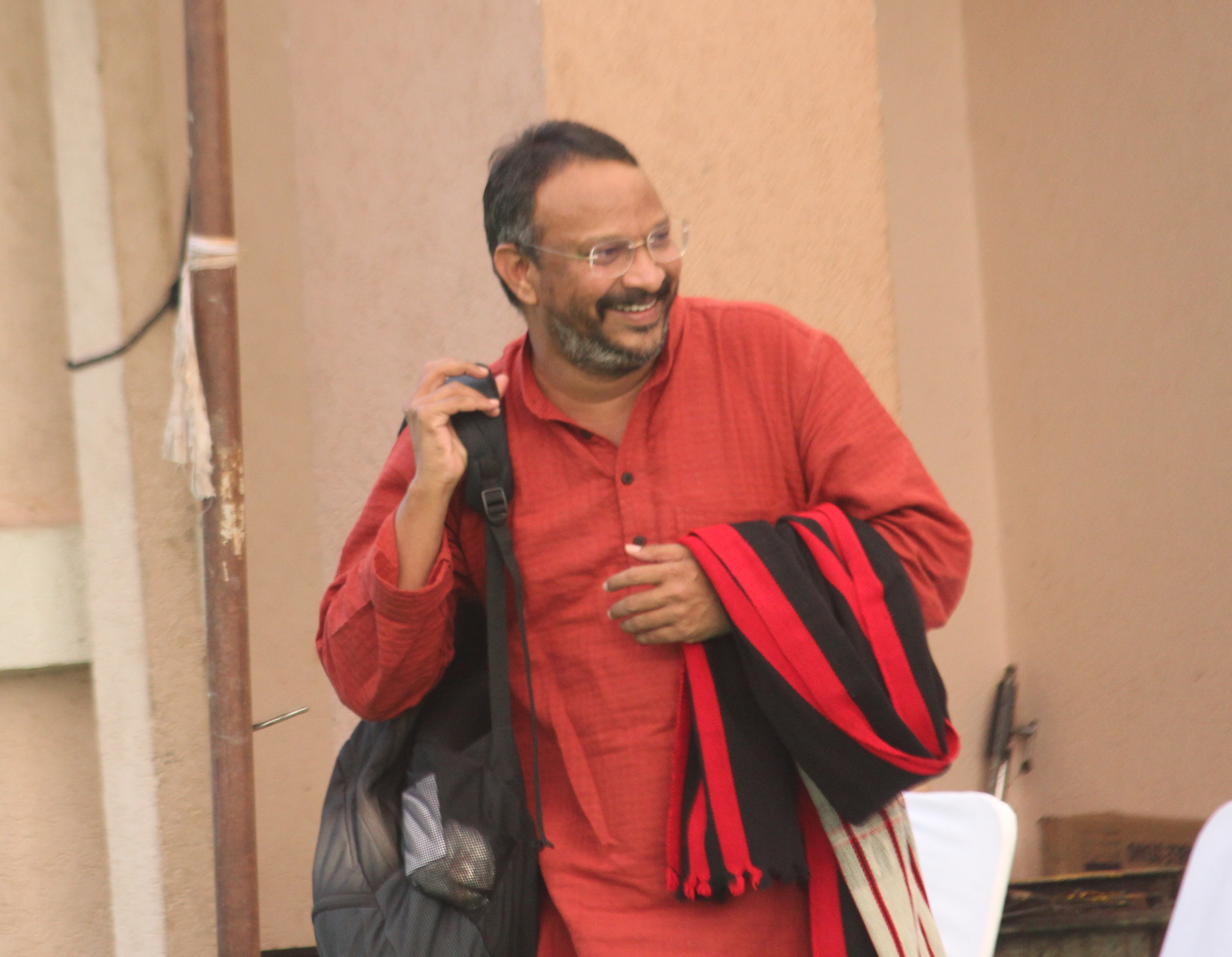
Bezwada Wilson, awardee in 2016, started a grassroots movement to eradicate manual scavenging in India.

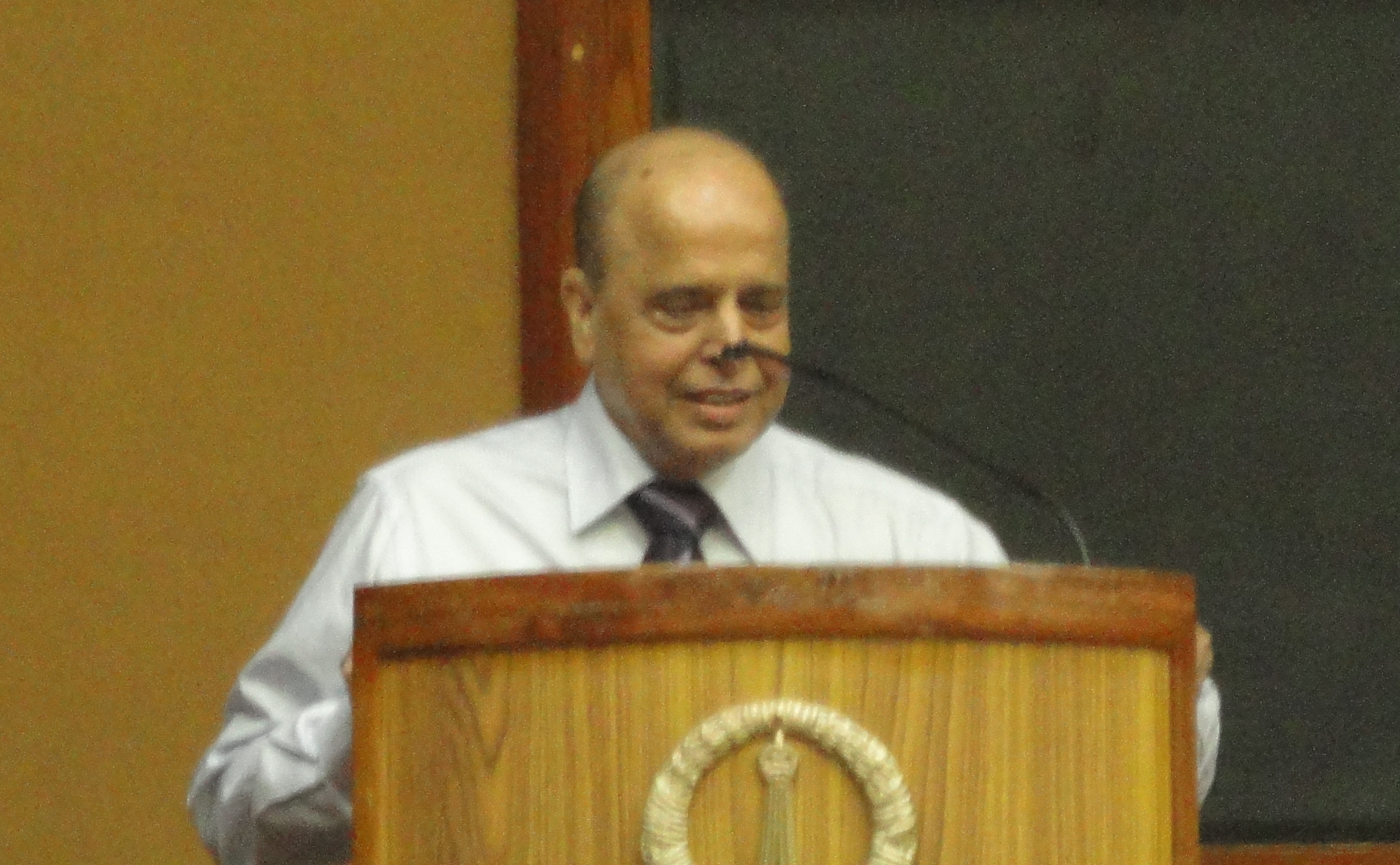
Dr. K. Kasturirangan, awardee in 2014, is a renowned space scientist. Head of ISRO from 1994 to 2003.

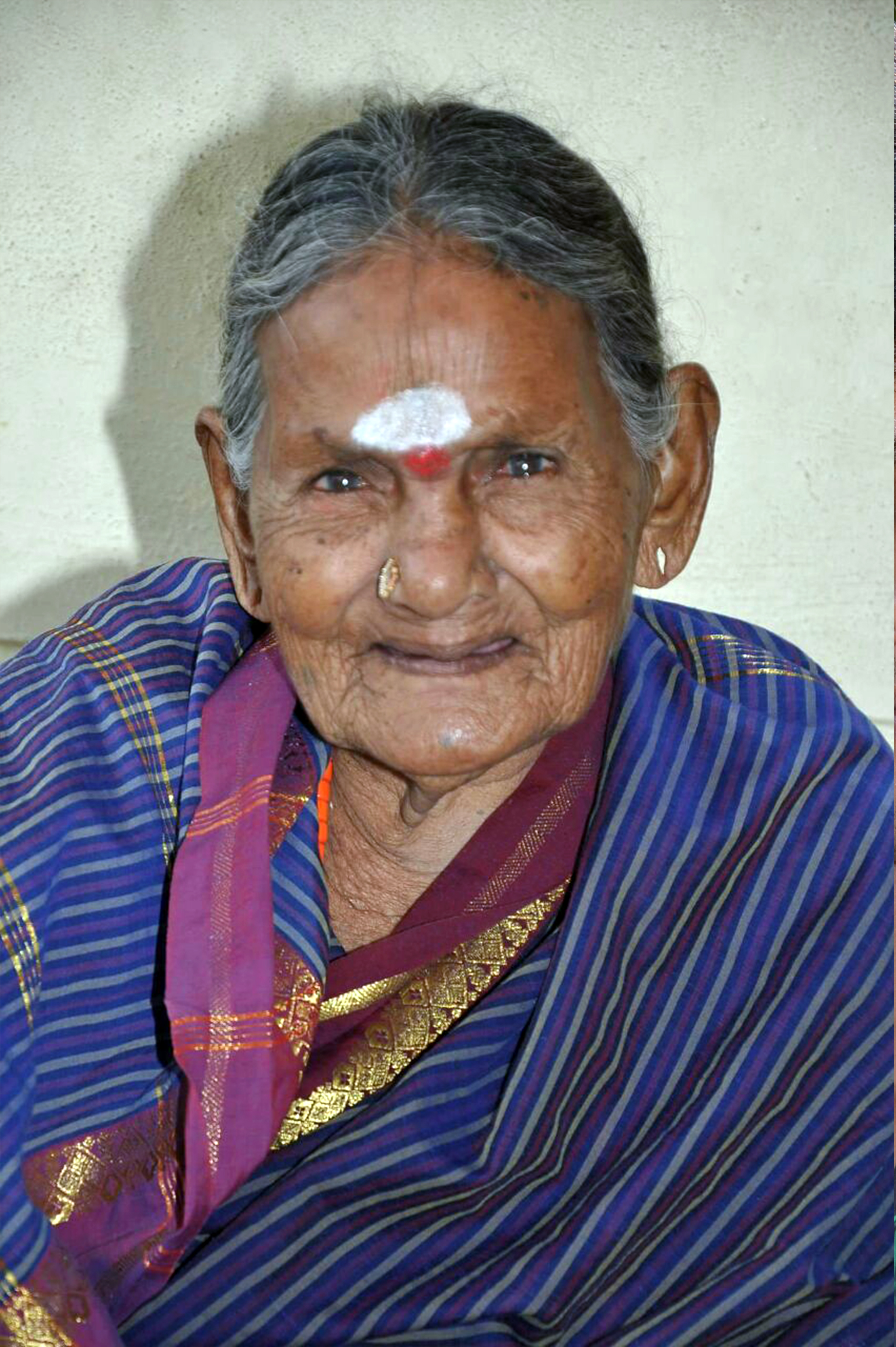
Sulagitti Narasamma, awardee in 2013, an Indian midwife from Pavagada (Tumkur) has performed 15,000+ traditional deliveries free of charge over 70-years.

=== 2024 awards ===
The Government of Karnataka announced 69 names for the year 2024 on the occasion of the 69th anniversary of the awards.

The awardees include Jude Felix Sebastian, the former India hockey star, Arun Yogiraj, the sculptor of the Ram statue installed at the Ram Mandir at Ayodhya and Real estate baron Irfan Razack of the Prestige Group.

=== 2023 awards ===
The Government of Karnataka announced 68 names for the year 2023 on the occasion of the 68th anniversary of the awards. Additionally, the government has recognized 10 associations and organizations that have demonstrated exceptional service to Karnataka state.

The awardees for 2023 include Prof. Dr. S. Sitharama Iyengar, Mimicry Dayanand. Journalists Dinesh Aminmattu, Charmadi Hasanabba, and several others, highlighting their significant contributions to society.

=== 2022 awards ===
The Government of Karnataka announced 67 names for the year 2022 on the occasion of the 67th anniversary of the awards.

The awardees for 2022 include former ISRO Chairman K. Sivan, writers A.R. Mitra and Krishne Gowda, Kannada actors Wing Commander H.G. Dattatreya (retd.), Avinash and Sihi Kahi Chandru.

On the occasion of the seventy fifth anniversary of Indian independence, 10 organisations, including Sri Ramakrishna Ashrama, Mysuru, Nele Foundation (for rehabilitating orphans), Amrutha Sishu Nivas have been selected for the award.

=== 2021 awards ===
On 1 November 2021, the then Chief Minister Basavaraj Bommai conferred 66 individuals, including Rohan Bopanna, Devaraj and others, with the award at Ravindra Kalakshetra.

=== 2020 awards ===
In November 2020, the then Chief Minister B. S. Yeddyurappa conferred 65 individuals with the award at Ravindra Kalakshetra.

=== 2019 awards ===
The Government of Karnataka announced 64 names for the year 2019 on the occasion of the 64th anniversary of the awards. The awards were given away at Ravindra Kalakshetra in Bengaluru on 1 November 2019 by Chief Minister B. S. Yeddyurappa.

The awardees for 2019 include K. Chidananda Gowda (former Vice Chancellor, Kuvempu University), V. A. Deshpande (sculptor), Mohan H Sitnoor (artist), Chandrakanth Karadalli (Children's writer), H. Kushi (young Yoga exponent), Muddu Mohan (Hindustani musician), among others.

=== 2018 awards ===
In 2018, the Government of Karnataka announced 63 names on the occasion of the 63rd anniversary of the awards. The awards were presented by Chief Minister HD Kumaraswamy at the Vidhana Soudha on 29 November 2018. Awardees included former Union Minister Margaret Alva, former Chief Justice of India H. L. Dattu, former Olympics sprinter Kenneth Lawrence Powell, Sandalwood actor Jai Jagadish National Public School founder KP Gopalkrishna, Nitin Hiremath, Bhargava Sarvamangala, and environmentalist Kalmane Kamegowda.

=== 2016 awards ===
The Government of Karnataka announced 61 names for the year 2016 on the occasion of the 61st anniversary of the awards.

=== 2015 awards ===
Hanumanth Hugar

The Government of Karnataka announced 60 names for the year 2015 on the occasion of the 60th anniversary of the awards.

=== 2014 awards ===
The Government of Karnataka announced 59 names for the year 2014 on the occasion of the 59th anniversary of the awards. The awards were given away at the Ravindra Kalakshetra in Bangalore on 1 November 2014. The 2014 awards saw 1924 nominations that were screened by a panel. Karnataka Chief Minister Siddaramiah announced that the government would bring out commemorative postal stamps of the 59 awardees.

The award winners for 2014 include S. Janaki (playback singer), Justice M N Venkatachalaih (former Chief Justice of India), Dr. K. Kasturirangan (former ISRO head), Dr. B.N. Suresh (ISRO scientist), M. R. Poovamma (athlete), Mamatha Poojari (kabaddi player), M. S. Rajashekar (Kannada movie director), Vaijanath Biradar Patil (veteran Kannada actor), D Kumardas (Hindustani vocal singer), amongst others.

=== 2003 awards ===
Included amount the recipients were Azim Premji, Rahul Dravid, Sree Ramaseva Mandali (organization), Rathnamma Hegde were some of the prominent awardees. Gurumurthy Reddy who was CMC president bommanahalli was also awarded for his social contribution towards society.

=== 1999 awards ===
Among others, K. S. Bhagawan was honoured for his contributions to the field of literature. D. M. Shambu was honoured for his contributions to the field of Sculpting

=== 1998 awards ===
Shesha Jayaram (Professor of Electrical and Computer Engineering & Director of HVEL, University of Waterloo, Canada). She was given the award for her contribution to science, electrical and high voltage engineering, and academia.

=== 1996 awards ===
Among others, C. P. Krishnakumar was given the award for his contribution to literature. Bharatanatyam exponent and dance teacher S. Narmada was awarded for Indian classical dance.

== List of awardees for prior years ==
- List of Rajyotsava award recipients (1966–1970)
- List of Rajyotsava award recipients (1971–1976)
- List of Rajyotsava award recipients (1981–1990)
- List of Rajyotsava award recipients (1991–2000)
