= Jogan Shankar =

Vice-Chancellor

Jogan Shankar is a professor of sociology in Mangalore University. He specializes in research on Deprived groups, Industrial Sociology, Indian Society and Research Methodology.

He was appointed as the Vice-Chancellor of Kuvempu University, Shimoga, for the period 2015 to 2019.

He has also been nominated as Senate Member of Karnataka University by Governor of Karnataka.

He was awarded the Karnataka state award and a national award in 1992 and 1993, respectively, for his significant contribution towards the welfare of marginalized women and children.
