= Manmohan Attavar =

Indian horticulturist

- Born: 12 July 1932; Karkala Karnataka, India
- Died: 12 December 2017 (aged 85); Bengaluru
- Occupations: Plant breeder Horticulturist
- Known for: Indo American Hybrid Seeds
- Spouse: Mamtha
- Children: Two children
- Awards: Padma Shri; Rajyotsava Award; Dr. M. H. Marigowda National Award; APEDA Award; ICA Golden Jubilee International Award; ISF Award
- Website: www.indamseeds.com

Manmohan Attavar ( 12 July 1932 - 12 December 2017) was an Indian horticulturist, plant breeder, writer and the founder of Indo American Hybrid Seeds (IAHS). He received the Padma Shri, the fourth highest civilian award from the Government of India in 1998 for his contributions to the field of Horticulture.

== Work ==
He founded an organization IAHS, engaged in scientific plant breeding and horticulture. and also the enterprise in 1965 and the organization, headquartered in Bengaluru, has grown to include 9 regional centres across India. He has served as a member of the Scientific Advisory Committee of the Ministry of Commerce and the Federation of International Seedsmen, Switzerland and has been a director of the National Horticultural Board. He has co-authored a book, Floriculture: technology, trades, and trends, which was published by Oxford and IBH Publishing House in 1994.

== Awards ==
He received the Padma Shri in 1998 from the government of India. Attavar is a recipient of several awards such as Dr. M. H. Marigowda National Award, APEDA Award, Golden Jubilee International Award of the International Chrysanthemum Society, California and ISF Award. The Government of Karnataka awarded him the Rajyotsava Prashasthi in 1991.

== Personal life ==
Attavar was married to Mamtha who has since died, leaving him with their two children.

Subsequent to her death, he donated a women's theatre block to CSI Lombard Memorial Hospital, Udupi and the hospital has named the facility as Martha Mamatha Attavar Memorial Block.
