= List of Hong Kong films of 1969 =

A list of films produced in Hong Kong in 1969:

== 1969 ==
Title	Director	Cast	Genre	Notes
1969
The Absurd Brave				
Accidental Trio	Pai Ching Jui			
The Adventures of Courtship	Cho Kei, Lee Hang	Yung Siu-Yi, Chan Tsai-Chung	Comedy	
Affection	Kao Li			
Beautiful Swordswoman	Yeung Siu			
Betrayer	Yuen Chau Fung			
Black Bull And White Snake				
Black Invitation				
The Black Panther	Wang Ping			
Bloody Handkerchief	Wong Fung			
Bloody Mask	Patrick Kong Yeung			
The Challenge				
The Charming Killer	Yang Fan			
The Devil Warrior (aka Little Devil)	Chan Lit-Ban	Petrina Fung Bo-Bo, Nancy Sit Ka-Yin, Sum Chi-Wah, Adam Cheng	Martial Arts	
From Here to Eternity	Cho Kei	Fung Chan, Fong Fai, Yung Siu-yi, Yuet-ching Lee	Drama	
IQ Kid	Liang Xi-Ping	David Lau Chi-Wing, Bonnie Ngai Chau-Wah, Cheung Ying, Nancy Liang Lan-Si, Wang Tian-Li, Chan Lap-Ban, Hui Ying-Ying		
Mysterious Weapon	Ling Yun	Suet Nei, Paul Chun Pui	Martial Arts	
The One-eyed Loner	Ling Yun	Lui Kei, Suet Nei, Sek Kin, Tam Bing-Man, Sze-Ma Wah-Lung, Yeung Yip-Wang, On Wai-Lin, Fung Ging-Man, Sai Gwa-Pau, Chan Ho-Kau	Martial Arts	
Supreme Sword (aka The Top Sword)	Ling Yun	Walter Tso Tat-Wah, Connie Chan Po-Chu	Martial Arts	
The Sword that Vanquished the Monster	Wu Pang	Yim-hing Law, Cheung Ying-Tsoi, Pearl Au Ka-Wai	Martial Arts	
Teddy Girls	Patrick Lung	Josephine Siao Fong-Fong, Tsui Yuk-ching, Nancy Sit Ka-Yin, Mang Lee, Lydia Shum, Guo Man-Na, Patrick Lung, Teresa Ha Ping	Drama	
The Virgin Sword	Chan Lit-Ban	Connie Chan Po-Chu, Kenneth Tsang Kong, Chan Ho-Kau, Yung Yuk-Yi	Martial Arts	
