= Devara Gedda Manava =

- Directed by: Hunsur Krishnamurthy
- Written by: S. Bhavanarayana
- Screenplay by: S. Bhavanarayana
- Produced by: Y. V. Rao
- Starring: Rajkumar; M. P. Shankar; Narasimharaju; Mikkilineni
- Cinematography: G. Chandran
- Edited by: R. Rajan
- Music by: Rajan–Nagendra
- Production company: Gowri Art Films
- Release date: 1 August 1967
- Country: India
- Language: Kannada

Devara Gedda Manava is a 1967 Indian Kannada-language film, directed by Hunsur Krishnamurthy and produced by Y. V. Rao. The film stars Rajkumar, M. P. Shankar, Narasimharaju and Mikkilineni. The film has musical score by Rajan–Nagendra. Rao and Krishnamurthy shot the movie simultaneously in Telugu as Devuni Gelichina Manavudu starring Kanta Rao.

== Plot ==
Vijaya (Dr. Rajkumar) is a professional gambler who makes a living via the same. But despite his expertise, he has lost a great deal of his property. Despite this, he greatly respects his mother and he's also devoted to Lord Shiva. One day after losing quite the stake in a gambling match, he gets into a quarrel with some drunk people but they somehow escape with his money. After hearing about this his mother gets him to promise never to gamble again. But Vijaya asks her permission for one final match to win everything back and unless he's won everything back via this match, he won't be at peace. His mother agrees.

The next day, he goes to find people that cheated him. Soon after seeing him, they run away. After a chase, one of them manages to trick Vijaya and lock him in Lord Shiva's temple. Bored and hungry, he started worshipping Lord Shiva knowing that after the rituals the food will be transformed into prasada. Hence, he does the same and snacks on the fruits. Having quenched his hunger, he requests Lord Shiva for a gambling match, but plays the die both sides by himself. He wins and as a reward he requests the Lord to give him something. When nothing happens, he says if he doesn't give anything he'll take Goddess Parvathi's statue as the stake. Goddess Parvathy who's watching this from Kailasa decides to curse him, but Lord Shiva stops her and drops his Damaruka as a stake for Vijaya's victory. Vijaya is confused but he figures out that by playing it he can summon anyone. He summons Ramba from Indraloka by accident, who tries to explain him that the Lord doesn't give away his precious Damaruka like that and it has to be a mistake. Vijaya refuses to listen to her and tells her that he won that square and fair, and if she thinks it should be with the Lord, she has to win it from him and return it to Him. She accepts the challenge but loses the match. The Lord appears as a disguised priest before the befuddled Ramba and tells her that it's only fair that she marries him. Ramba agrees.

On the other side, a demon named Mahabala has taken over the Kingdom of Swarnanagari and has captured both the ruler Yaksha Maharaja Devavrata and his daughter Mitravinda Devi. He has a boon that neither gods nor humans, but only a resurrected person can kill him. He believes that if he impresses the Swarnalinga in that kingdom he can shield himself even from the death by the hands of a resurrected person. To perform this ritual, he's in need of the Parijatha flower. Mahabala tells Mitravinda that if she wins over Ramba in Swargaloka and somehow gets him the Parijatha flower, he'd release them. He orders his subordinates Karkataka, Durmukha, Atibala and Nijabala to guard all the entrances and make sure no human enters the city before his penance is complete.

One fine day, Vijaya's mom catches him trying to go to gamble again and locks him up with the help of his younger brother Guruva (aka Guru) and asks him to keep watch of him. But with the help of Ramba, he escapes the place and leaves to heaven. Noticing that he has escaped, Guru goes in search of Vijaya. On his way, he finds a Rishi who is meditating for a mango, the seed of which if consumed will grant the consumer the power to orally spill Navaratnas every time the person laughs. Guruva accidentally eats up the mango kernel. The sage leaves disheartened. But on his way, Guru finds a Shiva temple where he asks the Lord that since his brother got Ramba, he would also like to get someone like Menaka. Soon a middle-aged woman visits the temple and he thinks this was the Lord's boon. He tries to pursue her but she doesn't seem interested. But after finding out that this person can spill Navaratnas when he laughs. She takes him home promising him that it's his daughter who is Menaka and not herself. They entertain him well and collect plenty of precious stones spilled every time he laughed. But they plan on getting the mango kernel for themselves not knowing that its effect only on the primary consumer. They succeed in making him vomit the mango kernel and leaving him to die, they clean it up and consume it only to find their plans have simply been in vain.

Mitravinda has finally made it to Swarga and has requested Indra for a dance-off with Ramba. Ramba wins and Vijaya who was with her was watching this all this while and enters the scene praising her. Indra is angered that Ramba has brought a human there which is regarded as a punishable offence and thereby curses her that she'll turn into a stone during the day but gets her human form only during nights. He also adds that in this duration of curse if she tries to get intimate with Vijaya, she'll turn into a statue permanently and would lead to Vijaya's untimely death, but this curse can be broken if the Abhisheka-jala (water that has been used to clean the idols) of Lord Swarnalingeshwara touches her head.

A dog comes to the rescue of Guru who was lying there unconscious and leads him to a tree. Grasping that the dog could be hungry he feeds it the fruit of the tree. It turns into the sage whom he had met before. He explains Guru that the trees seem to be cursed. The small fruits would make you a monkey, the big ones make you a dog and the middle-sized ones return you to your human form. Thinking that this will be useful in teaching a lesson to those women who left him to die, he collects a few fruits of all sizes and leaves the place. He heads back to their place and tricks them into eating those fruits and transforms the mother into a dog and her daughter into a monkey.

One night, Vijaya and Ramba had been accidentally intimate which leads to her becoming a statue permanently. So, he seeks out to Lord Shiva to help him. As a result of Indra's curse, Yama's messenger arrives at the temple to take him away with him. But Vijaya cleverly confuses them to find out which Yama they are talking about: the new one or the old one. They leave and now his question has confused everyone including Lord Indra. Hence, they all seek out to Lord Shiva himself. The Lord laughs at his cleverness and orders them to bring him telling that this time the invitation is from Shiva himself so that he won't refuse to come. Upon Vijaya's soul's arrival to Kailasa the Lord expresses to him that he has been impressed by his cleverness and tells Vijaya that he could ask for a boon. Vijaya is impressed and he requests to be in Indra's position for 30 galiges (equivalent to half a day). In his brief rule, he orders all the demigods like Agni, Vayu, Varuna and Yama to be better as he's seen many people and their crops being burned down, cyclones, floods and unfair deaths. After increasing his lifespan by ordering Chitragupta to do it, he warns all the gods that if things don't go as told by him, he will come back there.

People near the temple realize that Vijaya has died and try to take his body away. But soon his soul from Indraloka returns to his body and wakes up making him the resurrected man, scaring away the carrying crowd. He goes back to the temple to surprise his mother and brother who are crying there. From there they head out to find a cure to Ramba's curse. Guru uses Vijaya's Damaruka and summons Mitravinda and they take her along. They figure out that Mahabala's subordinates are guarding all the directions from where they can enter the Swarnanagari.

Using his magical mirror, Mahabali finds out that a person who has been resurrected is heading his way. Using his magical powers, he steals Ramba's statue from them. Mitravinda uses her magical powers to deduce where Ramba's statue maybe hidden. They find out that the place is guarded by Karkataka and Durmukha. Guru promises the monkey by transforming her back to human form, that if she somehow uses her dancing skills to get them to fight each other and trick them into eating those fruits, he'll convert her mom back too. She is successful and in the same way they also kill the other two subordinates. Leading to a final battle where Vijaya defeats Mahabali too, rescuing Devavrata from him. Impressed by his feats, the king requests him to ask for a boon. He just says that he'd like to break Ramba’s curse by using the Abhisheka-jala and requests the King to perform pooja to the Lord. Using the Abhisheka-jala he finally frees Ramba of her curse. Guru had also started liking Mitravinda to which Devavrata also expresses consent.

Vijaya’s mother tells him that he never won the Damaruka, it was all the Lord’s play. So, it’s his duty to now return it back to him. He complies and the movie ends with them all praying the Lord.

== Cast ==
- Rajkumar
- M. P. Shankar
- Narasimharaju
- Mikkilineni
- GVG
- Venumadhav
- M. S. Ranganath
- Guggu
- Sambashiva Rao
- Modukuri Sathyam
- Jayakrishna
- Shyamsundar
- N. V. Rajavarma
- Ganesh
- Sarathi
- Bheemaraju
- Suryanarayana
- Seetharam
- P. S. Reddy
- Raju
- Jayanthi
- Vijaya Lalitha
- Shylashri
- Ramadevi
- B. Jayashree
- Chayadevi
- Saraswathi
- Renu
- Nagini

== Soundtrack ==
The music was composed by Rajan–Nagendra.

No.	Song	Singers	Lyrics	Length (m:ss)
1	"Chakkal Gulli Ittaadisi"	P. B. Sreenivas	Hunsur Krishnamurthy	02:55
