= Kalmane Kamegowda =

Shepherd and environmentalist (c. 1940-2022)

- Born: c. 1940; Dasanadoddi, Mandya district, Karnataka, India
- Died: October 17, 2022 (aged 81–82); Mandya, Karnataka
- Other names: Kere Kamegowda; "Pond man"
- Occupations: Shepherd; environmentalist
- Years active: 1970s—2021
- Known for: Water conservation in India
- Notable work: Construction of ponds in Kundinibetta
- Awards: Rajyotsava Prashasti (2018)

Kalmane Kamegowda (c. 1940 – 17 October 2022), also known as Kere Kamegowda or more commonly "Pond man", was an Indian shepherd and environmentalist from Mandya district, in the state of Karnataka, India. Over four decades, he constructed ponds in the Kundinibetta region that addressed water scarcity and supported local vegetation and wildlife.

== Biography ==
Kamegowda was born in c. 1940 in Dasanadoddi village, Malavalli taluk, Mandya district, Karnataka. He came from a shepherd family and was not formally schooled. While grazing livestock on Kundinibetta hillock, he observed water shortages affecting animals and birds during summer.

Kamegowda began constructing ponds for wildlife in the late 1970s using basic tools, and later rented mechanical excavators at a cost Rs 6,000–8,000 per day. The work was financed from his own earnings, and those of his son, through livestock sales, spending over 10 Lakh. The ponds were constructed on slopes and were interconnected so that they would fill sequentially during monsoon seasons, hence contributing to groundwater recharge in the Malavalli region. Despite initial dismissive community response, the ponds provided water for local fauna including bears, leopards, deer, foxes, and birds.

By 2018, Kamegowda had completed fourteen ponds, and following receipt of the Rajyotsava award, he used the funds to construct an additional pond. By 2020, sixteen ponds were completed, some named after his grandchildren.

In his latter years, Kamegowda experienced health issues including leg uclers and diabetes; and tested positive for COVID-19 in July 2020, and recovered. He died on 17 October 2022 in Mandya, Karnataka.

== Honours and awards ==
He was awarded the Rajyotsava award in 2018 by the Karnataka state government. In July 2020, the state government announced that Kamegowda would receive a lifetime free pass for use on state transport buses. In March 2021, following reports of health issues, the government provided financial assistance for medical treatment and initiated the naming of a park in his honour. In the same year, the government allocated funds for watershed development in the area.

In June 2020, Prime Minister of India, Narendra Kumar mentioned Kamegowda during his monthly Mann Ki Baat radio address, and his work was noted in discussions of water conservation approaches in Karnataka.
