= List of Rajyotsava Award recipients (1971–1976) =

Karnataka Rajyotsava Prashasti
- Civilian award
- Sponsored by: Government of Karnataka
- Formerly called: Mysore State Award (1966–1972)
- Rewards: • ₹100,000/- • Gold Medal
- First award: 1966
- Final award: 2020

Highlights
- Total awarded: 2400 (Awardees including Individuals & Institutions)

The Rajyotsava Prashasti or Rajyotsava Awards, the second highest civilian honor of the Karnataka state of India are conferred annually by the Karnataka Government on the occasion of the establishment of the state on 1 November celebrated as the Kannada Rajyotsava.

The awards are presented in Bengaluru by the Chief Minister of Karnataka on 1 November of every year. Each award carries an amount of ₹100,000, a 20-gram gold medal and a citation. In addition to that, the government has in the past, allotted commercial land for eligible awardees.

== Recipients ==
Between 1971 and 1976 the award was given to—

Year	Recipients	Field
1971	B. L. S. Murthy	Social Work
1971	B. V. Nagesha Shetty	Social Work
1971	D. Govinda Das	Social Work
1971	Sheru N. Pillai	Social Work
1971	A. C. Devegowda	Education
1971	L. Monteiro	Education
1971	J. S. Jeergi	Education
1971	Iftikhar Ahmed	Engineering
1971	Mohammed Hayaz	Engineering
1971	M. Chinnaswamy	Sports
1971	N. Channakeshavaiah	Music
1971	Girish Karnad	Drama / Cinema
1971	N. Hanumaiah	Fine Arts
1971	Annappa Gomanna	Agriculture
1971	R. Narasimhaiah	Agriculture
1972	K. Shama Iyer	Social Work
1972	M. Siddalingaiah	Education
1972	Thitte Krishna Iyengar	Music
1972	N. Srinivasa Murthy	Music
1972	Y. Subramanya Raju	Fine Arts
1972	H. T. Sasnur	Home guards
1972	K. S. Shadaksharappa	Medicine
1972	K. S. Narasimhaswamy	Literature
1972	G. Narayana	Social Work
1972	Honnaiah	Social Work
1972	T. Linganna Gowda	Agriculture
1972	B. T. Lakshminarayana Shetty	Religious Work
1972	G. Raghunath	Agriculture
1972	Lakshmi Balasubramaniam	Social Work
1972	Masti Venkatesha Iyengar	Literature
1973	K. Ananthasubba Rao	Research
1973	Yenagi Balappa	Drama
1973	Kusthi Basappa	Social Work
1973	Chikkahanumanthaiah	Social Work
1973	Narendra Singh	Social Work
1973	V. R. Naidu	Social Work
1973	R. S. Naidu	Fine Arts
1973	M. Nanjundaiah	Fine Arts
1973	P. L. Bankapur	Social Work
1973	Basavaraj Kattimani	Literature
1973	Benjamin Isaac	Medicine
1973	Manikyam	Medicine
1973	B. P. Mallaraj Urs	Education
1973	M. Muddubhyrappa	Social Work
1973	Rajkumar	Cinema
1973	M. G. Vijayasarathy	Social Work
1973	S. R. Ganiger	Social Work
1973	G. P. Shivaram	Education
1973	H. Srikantaiah	Social Work
1973	Sattar Abbashet	Social Work
1973	Neelamma Kadambi	Music
1974	Agram Rangayya	Journalism
1974	M. R. Acharya	Engineering
1974	K. C. Nayak	Agriculture
1974	G. V. Narayana Reddy	Social Work
1974	S. V. Parameshwara Bhatta	Education
1974	B. P. Radhakrishna	Geology
1974	M. Shivaram	Literature
1974	Padmavathi Bai	Social Work
1974	Rahamat Baig	Social Work
1974	M. N. Varadarajulu	Social Work
1974	Suleiman Quasim	Social Work
1975	T. Anantarama Shetty	Social Work
1975	B. N. Gupta	Literature
1975	M. Gopal	Journalism
1975	H. M. Gangadharaiah	Social Work
1975	P. R. Thippeswamy	Fine Arts
1975	K. S. Narendran	Social Work
1975	N. Bhadraiah	Education
1975	B. S. Ramappa	Medicine
1975	U. R. Rao	Science
1975	V. L. D'souza	Education
1975	G. Channamma	Music
1975	N. Chokkamma	Music
1975	Mirza S. Moghul	Social Work
1976	K. S. Ramaswamy	Social Work
1976	K. R. Lingappa	Social Work
1976	K. Balasubramaniam	Education
1976	V. Ambla	Medicine
1976	Shankara Deva	Social Work
1976	Mir Iqbal Hussain	Social Work
1976	G. N. Reddy	Social Work
1976	Patil Puttappa	Literature
1976	A. S. Lakshman	Journalism
1976	S. S. Kukke	Fine Arts
1976	R. Muniratnam	Music
1976	R. K. Suryanarayana	Music
