= 1969 in film =

The year 1969 in film involved some significant events, with Butch Cassidy and the Sundance Kid dominating the U.S. box office and becoming one of the highest-grossing films of all time and Midnight Cowboy, a film rated X, winning the Academy Award for Best Picture. United Artists would celebrate their 50th anniversary.

== Top-grossing films (U.S.) ==
The top ten 1969 released films by box office gross in North America are as follows:

Highest-grossing films of 1969
Rank	Title	Distributor	Domestic rentals
1	Butch Cassidy and the Sundance Kid	20th Century Fox	$29,200,000
2	The Love Bug	Buena Vista	$21,000,000
3	Midnight Cowboy	United Artists	$20,500,000
4	Easy Rider	Columbia	$16,900,000
5	Hello, Dolly!	20th Century Fox	$15,000,000
6	Bob & Carol & Ted & Alice	Columbia	$14,600,000
7	Paint Your Wagon	Paramount	$14,500,000
8	True Grit	Paramount	$14,300,000
9	A Boy Named Charlie Brown	National General Pictures	$12,000,000
10	Cactus Flower	Columbia	$11,900,000

== Events ==
- January 14 - Louis F. Polk Jr. becomes president and CEO of Metro-Goldwyn-Mayer
- January 28 - Kinney National Services Inc. announces its intention to acquire Warner Bros.-Seven Arts. The deal is completed in July for a total cost of nearly $400 million.
- February 23 - Madhubala dies due to a congenital heart disease, at age 36.
- June 22 - American singer and actress Judy Garland dies at age 47 of an accidental barbiturate overdose in London.
- July 13 - Al Pacino's film debut (Me, Natalie).
- Summer - Last year for prize giving at the Venice Film Festival until it is revived in 1980. From 1969 to 1979, the festival is non-competitive.
- August 8 - Kirk Kerkorian buys 24% of Metro-Goldwyn-Mayer, becoming the biggest shareholder.
- August 9 - Tate murders: Sharon Tate, the 26-year-old pregnant actress, model and Roman Polanski's wife, is murdered by Charles Manson's "Family" at 10050 Cielo Drive in Beverly Hills, California, aside three friends and an unrelated man.
- August 29 - The Color of Pomegranates now regarded as a landmark in film history
- September 20 - Injun Trouble featuring Cool Cat is released, becoming the final entry of Merrie Melodies before Warner Bros.-Seven Arts Animation was shut down.
- November 10 - Elvis Presley's film career ends with the release of Change of Habit.
- Jack and Jill: A Postscript becomes the first feature film to receive an Australian Film Institute Award.

== Awards ==
Category/Organization	27th Golden Globe Awards February 2, 1970		23rd BAFTA Awards March 8, 1970	42nd Academy Awards April 7, 1970
Category/Organization	Drama	Musical or Comedy	23rd BAFTA Awards March 8, 1970	42nd Academy Awards April 7, 1970
Best Film	Anne of the Thousand Days	The Secret of Santa Vittoria	Midnight Cowboy	
Best Director	Charles Jarrott; Anne of the Thousand Days		John Schlesinger; Midnight Cowboy	
Best Actor	John Wayne; True Grit	Peter O'Toole; Goodbye, Mr. Chips	Dustin Hoffman; John and Mary / Midnight Cowboy	John Wayne; True Grit
Best Actress	Genevieve Bujold; Anne of the Thousand Days	Patty Duke; Me, Natalie	Maggie Smith; The Prime of Miss Jean Brodie	
Best Supporting Actor	Gig Young; They Shoot Horses, Don't They?		Laurence Olivier; Oh! What a Lovely War	Gig Young; They Shoot Horses, Don't They?
Best Supporting Actress	Goldie Hawn; Cactus Flower		Celia Johnson; The Prime of Miss Jean Brodie	Goldie Hawn; Cactus Flower
Best Screenplay, Adapted	Bridget Boland, John Hale and Richard Sokolove; Anne of the Thousand Days		Waldo Salt; Midnight Cowboy	Waldo Salt; Midnight Cowboy
Best Screenplay, Original	Bridget Boland, John Hale and Richard Sokolove; Anne of the Thousand Days		Waldo Salt; Midnight Cowboy	William Goldman; Butch Cassidy and the Sundance Kid
Best Original Score	Burt Bacharach; Butch Cassidy and the Sundance Kid		N/A	Burt Bacharach; Butch Cassidy and the Sundance Kid; Lennie Hayton and Lionel Newman; Hello, Dolly!
Best Original Song	"Jean"; The Prime of Miss Jean Brodie		N/A	"Raindrops Keep Fallin' on My Head"; Butch Cassidy and the Sundance Kid
Best Foreign Language Film	Z		N/A	Z

Palme d'Or (Cannes Film Festival):

If...., directed by Lindsay Anderson, United Kingdom

Golden Bear (Berlin Film Festival):

Rani Radovi (Early Works), directed by Želimir Žilnik, Yugoslavia

== 1969 films ==
=== By country/region ===
- List of American films of 1969
- List of Argentine films of 1969
- List of Australian films of 1969
- List of Bangladeshi films of 1969
- List of British films of 1969
- List of Canadian films of 1969
- List of French films of 1969
- List of Hong Kong films of 1969
- List of Indian films of 1969
  - List of Hindi films of 1969
  - List of Kannada films of 1969
  - List of Malayalam films of 1969
  - List of Marathi films of 1969
  - List of Tamil films of 1969
  - List of Telugu films of 1969
- List of Japanese films of 1969
- List of Mexican films of 1969
- List of Pakistani films of 1969
- List of South Korean films of 1969
- List of Soviet films of 1969
- List of Spanish films of 1969

=== By genre/medium ===
- List of action films of 1969
- List of animated feature films of 1969
- List of avant-garde films of 1969
- List of comedy films of 1969
- List of drama films of 1969
- List of horror films of 1969
- List of science fiction films of 1969
- List of thriller films of 1969
- List of western films of 1969

== Short film series ==
- Looney Tunes (1930–1969)
- Merrie Melodies (1931–1969)
- Cool Cat (1967—1969)
- Merlin the Magic Mouse (1967—1969)
- The Pink Panther (1963–1969, 1971–1977, 1978–1980)
- The Inspector (1965-1969)
- The Ant and the Aardvark (1969–1971)
- Roland and Rattfink (1968–1971)
- Tijuana Toads (1969–1972)
- Woody Woodpecker (1941–1949, 1951–1972)
- Chilly Willy (1955–1972)
- The Beary Family (1962–1972)

== Births ==
- January 1
  - Morris Chestnut, American actor
  - Mr. Lawrence, American voice actor, comedian, writer, storyboard artist, animator and director
  - Verne Troyer, American actor (died 2018)
- January 2
  - Nicholas Gleaves, English actor
  - Tommy Morrison, American professional boxer, mixed martial artist and actor (d. 2013)
- January 3 - John Ales, American actor
- January 5 - Shea Whigham, American actor
- January 6 - Norman Reedus, American actor
- January 8 - Ami Dolenz, American former actress
- January 11 - Kyle Richards, American actress
- January 14 – Jason Bateman, American actor
- January 15 - Meret Becker, German actress and singer
- January 17
  - Nigel Lindsay, English actor
  - James Waterston, American actor
- January 18 – Dave Bautista, American actor and former professional wrestler
- January 20 - Reno Wilson, American actor
- January 21
  - Karina Lombard, Tahitan actress
  - Matt Willig, American actor and former football player
- January 22
  - Olivia d'Abo, British actress and singer
  - Xu Qing, Chinese actress
- January 23 - Stephanie Romanov, American actress
- January 27 – Patton Oswalt, American stand-up comedian, actor, voice actor, and writer
- January 28 - Kathryn Morris, American actress
- January 29 - Sam Trammell, American actor
- February 3 - Shane Rangi, New Zealand actor
- February 4 - Brandy Ledford, American actress and model
- February 5
  - Bobby Brown, American singer-songwriter and actor
  - Michael Sheen, Welsh actor and producer
- February 6
  - April Haney, American former actress and singer
  - Masaharu Fukuyama, Japanese actor and singer
  - David Hayter, Canadian actor, screenwriter, director, and producer
- February 8
  - Brian Krause, American actor
  - Mary McCormack, American actress
- February 11
  - Jennifer Aniston, American actress
  - Lee Tockar, Canadian voice actor and visual artist
- February 12 - Darren Aronofsky, American director, producer and screenwriter
- February 13
  - JB Blanc, French actor
  - Andrew Bryniarski, American actor
- February 15 - James Riordan, American actor
- February 21 - Aunjanue Ellis-Taylor, American actress
- February 22 - Thomas Jane, American actor
- February 26 - Steve Agee, American comedian, actor, writer and musician
- February 28 - Robert Sean Leonard, American actor
- March 1 – Javier Bardem, Spanish actor
- March 6
  - Adam Fogerty, English actor
  - Amy Pietz, American actress and singer
- March 8 - Don Hall, American director, voice actor and writer
- March 10
  - Paget Brewster, American actress
  - Dave Sheridan, American actor, comedian, writer, producer and musician
- March 11 – Terrence Howard, American actor
- March 13 - Ross Harris, American former actor
- March 15 - Kim Raver, American actress and producer
- March 16 - Judah Friedlander, American actor and comedian
- March 17 - Patrick Van Horn, American actor
- March 19
  - Kevin Shinick, American actor, writer, producer and director
  - Connor Trinneer, American actor
- March 21 - Allen Coulter, American director
- March 22 - Andreas Pietschmann, German actor
- March 23 - Richard Cadell, Illusionist, puppeteer and screenwriter
- March 27 - Kevin Corrigan, American character actor
- March 28 - Brett Ratner, American director and producer
- March 31 - Eijiro Ozaki, Japanese actor
- April 2 – Ajay Devgan, Indian actor
- April 3 – Ben Mendelsohn, Australian actor
- April 6 – Paul Rudd, American actor
- April 14 - James Gray, American filmmaker, producer and screenwriter
- April 21
  - Toby Stephens, English actor
  - Joel de la Fuente, American actor
- April 23 – Byron Thames, American actor
- April 24 - Rory McCann, Scottish actor
- April 25
  - Gina Torres, American actress
  - Renée Zellweger, American actress
- April 29
  - Paul Adelstein, American actor
  - Jo Martin, British actress
- May 1 – Wes Anderson, American director
- May 2 - Karel Dobrý, Czech actor
- May 7 - Jerry Della Salla, American actor
- May 9 - Joe Carnahan, American director, screenwriter, producer and actor
- May 10
  - Rebecca Root, English actress and comedian
  - Lenny Venito, American actor
- May 12 - Kim Fields, American actress and director
- May 14 – Cate Blanchett, Australian actress
- May 15 - Kirk DeMicco, American filmmaker
- May 16 – David Boreanaz, American actor, television producer and director
- May 22
  - Michael Kelly, American actor
  - Cle Shaheed Sloan, American actor
- May 24 – Carl Anthony Payne II, American actor
- May 25 – Anne Heche, American actress (d. 2022)
- May 27 - Glenn Ficarra, American screenwriter, director and producer
- May 28 - Justin Kirk, American actor
- June 1 – Teri Polo, American actress
- June 2 - Ol Parker, English director, producer and screenwriter
- June 3 - Tate Taylor, American filmmaker and actor
- June 4
  - Rob Huebel, American actor, comedian and writer
  - Horatio Sanz, Chilean-born American actor and comedian
- June 6 - Nina Sosanya, English actress and narrator
- June 7
  - Adam Buxton, English actor, comedian and writer
  - Kim Rhodes, American actress
  - Anthony Simcoe, Australian actor
- June 8
  - J. P. Manoux, American actor, director and writer
  - David Sutcliffe, Canadian former actor
- June 9 - Josh Hamilton, American actor
- June 11 – Peter Dinklage, American actor
- June 12 - Andrew Howard, Welsh actor
- June 13 - Laura Kightlinger, American actress, writer and comedian
- June 15
  - Ice Cube, American actor and rapper
  - Patrick Mofokeng, South African actor
- June 16 - Karina Arroyave, Colombian-American actress
- June 18 - Ella Kenion, English comedy actress
- June 19 - Sean Anders, American director and screenwriter
- June 21 - Lloyd Avery II, American actor (d. 2005)
- June 23
  - David Dobkin, American director, producer and screenwriter
  - Martin Klebba, American character actor and stunt performer
- June 24 - Jensen Daggett, American actress
- June 28
  - Tichina Arnold, American actress
  - Angeline Ball, Irish actress
  - Ayelet Zurer, Israeli actress
- June 29 - Aleks Paunovic, Canadian actor
- July 2 - John Emmet Tracy, American-Canadian actor
- July 3
  - Shawnee Smith, American actress and singer
  - Gedeon Burkhard, German actor
- July 4 - Charles Paraventi, American-born Brazilian actor
- July 5 - RZA, American rapper, actor and filmmaker
- July 6 - Brian Van Holt, American actor
- July 7
  - Cree Summer, American-Canadian actress, voice actress and singer
  - Robin Weigert, American actress
- July 8 - Rachael Lillis, American voice actress and screenwriter (d. 2024)
- July 9 - Carlos Leal, Swiss actor
- July 10
  - Jamie Glover, English actor
  - Gale Harold, American actor
- July 13 - Ken Jeong, American stand-up comedian, actor and producer
- July 17
  - Jason Clarke, Australian actor
  - Kazuki Kitamura, Japanese actor
- July 20
  - Josh Holloway, American actor
  - Joon Park, American actor and singer
- July 21 – Godfrey, American actor, comedian
- July 22 – James Arnold Taylor, American actor, writer and producer
- July 24
  - Rick Fox, Canadian-Bahamian former basketball player and actor
  - Jennifer Lopez, American actress, singer
- July 25
  - Dave B. Mitchell, American voice actor
  - D. B. Woodside, American actor
- July 28
  - Alexis Arquette, American actress (d. 2016)
  - Noma Dumezweni, British actress
- July 30 - Simon Baker, Australian actor
- July 31
  - Ben Chaplin, British actor
  - Loren Dean, American actor
- August 4
  - Vlad Ivanov, Romanian actor
  - Fenella Woolgar, English actress
- August 5
  - Chuck Campbell, Canadian actor and comedian
  - Kim Mai Guest, American voice actress
- August 6 - Chris Edgerly, American voice actor, comedian and singer
- August 8 - Chris Beetem, American actor
- August 11 - Ashley Jensen, Scottish actress
- August 12 - Nev Fountain, English writer
- August 15 - Kimberley Kates, American actress and producer
- August 16
  - Kate Higgins, American voice actress and singer
  - Andy Milder, American actor
- August 17 - Donnie Wahlberg, American singer, songwriter, rapper, actor and producer
- August 18
  - Edward Norton, American actor
  - Christian Slater, American actor
- August 19
  - John Crowley, Irish director
  - Viveka Davis, American actress
  - Paula Jai Parker, American actress
  - Matthew Perry, Canadian-American actor (d. 2023)
- August 20 - Billy Gardell, American actor and stand-up comedian
- August 21 - Nathan Jones, Australian actor and former professional wrestler
- August 24 - Pierfrancesco Favino, Italian actor and producer
- August 27
  - Reece Shearsmith, English actor, writer and comedian
  - Chandra Wilson, American actress and director
- August 28
  - Jack Black, American actor, comedian, musician
  - Jason Priestley, Canadian-American actor and television director
- August 31 - Jonathan LaPaglia, Australian actor
- September 3
  - Noah Baumbach, American director and screenwriter
  - John Fugelsang, American actor, comedian, writer and television host
- September 4
  - Mo Brings Plenty, Olgala Lakota actor
  - Noah Taylor, Australian actor
- September 6 - Trina McGee, American actress
- September 7 - Angie Everhart, American actress
- September 10 - Johnathon Schaech, American actor and screenwriter
- September 13
  - Amma Asante, British filmmaker, screenwriter and former actress
  - Ace Bhatti, British actor
  - Dominic Fumusa, American actor
  - Tyler Perry, American actor
- September 14
  - Bong Joon-ho, Korean director and screenwriter
  - Oscar Kightley, Samoan-born New Zealand actor, television presenter, writer, director and comedian
- September 20
  - Victoria Dillard, American former actress
  - Bianca Hunter, American actress
- September 21 - Ivan Shvedoff, Russian actor
- September 22 - Sue Perkins, English actress, broadcaster, comedian, presenter and writer
- September 23
  - Crispin Bonham-Carter, English actor
  - Shaw Jones, American actor
- September 25 – Catherine Zeta-Jones, Welsh actress
- September 26 - David Slade, British director and actor
- September 29 – Erika Eleniak, American actress
- September 30
  - Amy Landecker, American actress
  - Silas Weir Mitchell, American character actor
  - Mark Smith, British actor
- October 1 – Zach Galifianakis, American actor
- October 2 - Dragomir Mrsic, Serbian-Swedish actor
- October 3 – Gwen Stefani, American singer, songwriter and actress
- October 4
  - Abraham Benrubi, American actor
  - Jerry Minor, American actor, comedian and writer
- October 6 - Rob Campbell, American actor
- October 7 - Bobbie Brown, American actress
- October 8
  - Jeremy Davies, American actor
  - Dylan Neal, Canadian-American actor
- October 9 – Steve McQueen, English director
- October 10
  - Manu Bennett, New Zealand actor
  - Wendi McLendon-Covey, American actress and comedian
- October 11 - Stephen Moyer, English actor and director
- October 15 – Dominic West, English actor
- October 16 - Terri J. Vaughn, American actress, director and producer
- October 17
  - Wood Harris, American actor
  - Kevin Stea, American actor, singer and director
  - Nancy Sullivan, American actress, television presenter, and screenwriter
- October 19
  - Caroline Catz, British actress
  - Roger Cross, Jamaican-born Canadian actor
  - Trey Parker, American actor, creator of South Park
- October 22 - Spike Jonze, American director, producer, screenwriter and actor
- October 25 - Nika Futterman, American actress, voice actress and singer
- October 26 - Robert Maillet, Canadian actor and former professional wrestler
- October 27 - Peter O'Meara, Irish actor
- October 31 - David Coburn, American actor
- November 4
  - Matthew McConaughey, American actor
  - Samantha Smith, American actress
- November 8
  - Don McManus, American actor
  - Jonathan Slavin, American actor
- November 10
  - Jennifer Cody, American dancer and actress
  - Ellen Pompeo, American actress
- November 13 – Gerard Butler, Scottish actor
- November 19 - Erika Alexander, American actress, writer and producer
- November 20 - Callie Thorne, American actress
- November 21 - John Ortiz, American actor
- November 27
  - Elizabeth Marvel, American actress
  - Chin Han, Singaporean actor
- November 28
  - Martin Cummins, Canadian actor
  - Colman Domingo, American actor, writer and director
- November 30
  - Marc Forster, German-Swiss director, producer and screenwriter
  - Conan Stevens, Australian actor
  - Chris Weitz, American director, screenwriter and producer
- December 5 - Eric Etebari, Iranian-American actor
  - Lynne Ramsay, Scottish film director, writer, producer, and cinematographer
  - Catherine Tate, English actress, comedian and writer
- December 7 - Patrice O'Neal, American stand-up comedian, actor and radio personality (d. 2011)
- December 9 - Allison Smith, American actress, singer, writer and director
- December 10 - Stephen Billington, English actor
- December 11 - Max Martini, American actor, writer and director
- December 13 - Tony Curran, Scottish actor
- December 14
  - Greg Hemphill, Scottish-Canadian comedian, actor, writer and director
  - Archie Kao, American actor and producer
- December 15
  - Adriana Esteves, Brazilian actress
  - Ralph Ineson, English actor and narrator
- December 19 – Kristy Swanson, American actress
- December 20 - Brian O'Halloran, American actor, producer and podcaster
- December 21 – Julie Delpy, French actress
- December 24 - Sean Cameron Michael, South African actor, writer and singer
- December 27 - Sarah Vowell, American actress
- December 29
  - Jennifer Ehle, American actress
  - Patrick Fischler, American character actor
- December 30 - Meredith Monroe, American actress

== Deaths ==
- January 1 – Barton MacLane, 66, American actor, The Maltese Falcon, The Treasure of the Sierra Madre
- January 3 – Howard McNear, 63, American actor, Anatomy of a Murder, Voyage to the Bottom of the Sea, Blue Hawaii, Follow That Dream
- January 4 – Violet and Daisy Hilton, 60, English conjoined twins, actresses, appeared in film Freaks
- January 8 – Leslie Goodwins, 69, English director, The Mummy's Curse, Mexican Spitfire
- January 27 – Charles Winninger, 84, American actor, Destry Rides Again, The Sun Shines Bright
- February 2 – Boris Karloff, 81, English actor, Dr. Seuss' How the Grinch Stole Christmas!, Frankenstein, The Mummy, The Raven
- February 5 – Thelma Ritter, 66, American actress, Rear Window, All About Eve
- February 9 – Gabby Hayes, 83, American actor, The Man from Utah, In Old Oklahoma
- February 11 – James Lanphier, 48, American actor, The Pink Panther, The Party
- February 19 - Madge Blake, 69, American actress, The Long, Long Trailer, Batman
- February 23 - Madhubala, 36, Indian actress, Mahal, Chalti Ka Naam Gaadi, Mughal-E-Azam
- February 27 – John Boles, 73, American actor, Frankenstein, Stella Dallas
- March 18 – Barbara Bates, 43, American actress, The Caddy, All About Eve
- March 19 – Lola Braccini, 79, Italian actress, My Little One, What a Distinguished Family
- March 25 – Alan Mowbray, 72, British actor, Terror by Night, My Darling Clementine
- April 2 – Fortunio Bonanova, 74, Spanish actor, Citizen Kane, An Affair to Remember
- April 23 – Krzysztof Komeda, 37, Polish composer, Rosemary's Baby, The Fearless Vampire Killers
- May 3 – Karl Freund, 69, Czech-American cinematographer and director, Metropolis, The Mummy, Key Largo
- May 24
  - Paul Birch, 57, American actor, The Gun Runners, Gunmen from Laredo
  - Mitzi Green, 48, American actress, Lost in Alaska, Skippy
- May 27 – Jeffrey Hunter, 42, American actor, The Searchers, King of Kings
- June 2 – Leo Gorcey, 51, American actor, Ghost Chasers, Spook Busters
- June 8 – Robert Taylor, 57, American actor, Quo Vadis, Camille, Bataan, Ivanhoe
- June 10 – Frank Lawton, 64, English actor, A Night to Remember, The Devil-Doll
- June 13 – Martita Hunt, 70, Argentine-English actress, Becket, Great Expectations
- June 19 – Natalie Talmadge, 73, American silent screen actress, Our Hospitality, Intolerance
- June 20 – Rudolf Schwarzkogler, 29, Austrian experimental filmmaker, Satisfaction
- June 22 – Judy Garland, 47, American actress and singer, The Wizard of Oz, Gay Purr-ee, A Star Is Born
- June 23 – Stanley Andrews, 77, American actor, West of Wyoming, Across the Badlands, Canadian Mounties vs. Atomic Invaders
- July 5 - Lambert Hillyer, 75, American director, Dracula's Daughter, Batman
- July 5 – Leo McCarey, 72, American director, An Affair to Remember, Going My Way
- July 7 - Erskine Sanford, 83, American actor, Citizen Kane, The Magnificent Ambersons
- July 8 – Gladys Swarthout, 68, American singer, Romance in the Dark, Give Us This Night
- July 13 - Bess Meredyth, 79, American screenwriter, The Unsuspected, Charlie Chan at the Opera
- July 15 - Peter van Eyck, 57, Polish actor, The Wages of Fear, The Spy Who Came in from the Cold
- July 17 - Harry Benham, 85, American actor, Nicholas Nickleby
- July 18 - Barbara Pepper, 54, American actress, The Rogues Tavern, Kiss Me, Stupid
- July 26
  - Andrés Soler, 70, Mexican actor, A Day with the Devil, The Great Madcap,
  - Raymond Walburn, 81, American actor, High, Wide, and Handsome, Third Finger, Left Hand
- August 1 – Donald Keith, 65, American actor, The Plastic Age, Parisian Love
- August 9 – Sharon Tate, 26, American actress, The Fearless Vampire Killers, Valley of the Dolls
- August 14 – Sigrid Gurie, 58, American actress, Algiers, The Adventures of Marco Polo
- August 15 – William Goetz, 66, American producer, studio executive, Sayonara, Les Misérables
- August 18 – Mildred Davis, 68, American actress, Safety Last!, Grandma’s Boy
- August 26 – Martin Miller, 69, Czech actor, 55 Days at Peking, The Pink Panther
- September 14 – James Anderson, 48, American actor, To Kill a Mockingbird, Take the Money and Run
- September 19 – Rex Ingram, 73, American actor, The Adventures of Huckleberry Finn, The Thief of Bagdad
- October 8 – Eduardo Ciannelli, 81, Italian actor, Gunga Din, Strange Cargo
- October 12 – Sonja Henie, 57, Norwegian actress, former Olympic ice skater, Sun Valley Serenade, One in a Million
- October 15 – Rod La Rocque, 70, American actor, Meet John Doe, The Shadow Strikes
- October 28 – Constance Dowling, 49, American actress, Up in Arms, The Well-Groomed Bride
- November 5 – Lloyd Corrigan, 69, American actor, Son of Paleface, The Thin Man Goes Home
- November 8 – Dave O'Brien, 57, American actor, Captain Midnight, Brand of the Devil
- December 3 – Ruth White, 55, American actress, To Kill a Mockingbird, No Way to Treat a Lady
- December 7 – Eric Portman, 68, British actor, A Canterbury Tale, The Bedford Incident
- December 13 – Luigi Pavese, 72, Italian actor, Toto in Color, Il Mattatore
- December 22
  - Ilse Steppat, 52, German actress, On Her Majesty's Secret Service
  - Josef von Sternberg, 73, Austrian director, The Blue Angel, Macao

== Film debuts ==
- Bernard Alane – Hibernatus
- Adam Arkin – The Monitors
- Amitabh Bachchan – Saat Hindustani
- Bob Balaban – Midnight Cowboy
- Paul Bartel – Utterly Without Redeeming Social Value
- Bonnie Bedelia – The Gypsy Moths
- Ed Begley Jr. – The Computer Wore Tennis Shoes
- Paul Benjamin – Midnight Cowboy
- Kate Burton – Anne of the Thousand Days
- Bernie Casey – Guns of the Magnificent Seven
- Jill Clayburgh – The Wedding Party
- James Cosmo – Battle of Britain
- Max Cullen – You Can't See 'round Corners
- Bruce Davison – Last Summer
- Lesley-Anne Down – The Smashing Bird I Used to Know
- Michael Elphick – Fräulein Doktor
- Carmen Filpi – Wild Gypsies
- Bridget Fonda – Easy Rider
- Leif Garrett – Bob & Carol & Ted & Alice
- Björn Granath – Mistreatment
- Melanie Griffith – Smith!
- George Harris – The Gladiators
- Anjelica Huston – A Walk with Love and Death
- Raul Julia – Stiletto
- Margot Kidder – Gaily, Gaily
- Paul Koslo – House of Zodiac
- K.P.A.C Lalitha – Kootu Kudumbam
- Lorenzo Lamas – 100 Rifles
- George Lazenby – On Her Majesty's Secret Service
- Joanna Lumley – Some Girls Do
- Richard Lynch – Tigress
- Robert F. Lyons – Pendulum
- Miriam Margolyes – A Nice Girl Like Me
- Ian McKellen – A Touch of Love
- Charles Napier – Cherry, Harry & Raquel!
- Michael Nouri – Goodbye, Columbus
- Ryan O'Neal – The Big Bounce
- Al Pacino – Me, Natalie
- Mario Pardo – Love and Other Solitudes
- Ron Rifkin – The Devil's 8
- Sydne Rome – Some Girls Do
- John Savage – The Master Beater
- Hanna Schygulla – Hunting Scenes from Bavaria
- Jane Seymour – Oh! What a Lovely War
- Chuck Shamata – Change of Mind
- Sylvester Stallone – The Square Root
- Anna Thomson – Night of the Bloody Apes
- Oliver Tobias – Arthur? Arthur!
- Beverly Todd – The Lost Man
- Brenda Vaccaro – Where It's At
- Christopher Walken – Me and My Brother
- M. Emmet Walsh – Midnight Cowboy
- Frank Welker – The Trouble with Girls
- Ray Wise – Dare the Devil
