= Shesha Jayaram =

Indian-Canadian power engineer

Sheshakamal (Shesha) H. Jayaram is an Indian-Canadian power engineer specializing in high voltage systems, in advanced materials for high-voltage insulation, and in the application of high voltage pulses in food processing. She is a professor and university research chair of electrical and computer engineering at the University of Waterloo.

== Education and career ==
Jayaram received a bachelor's degree in electrical engineering from Bangalore University in India in 1980, and a master's degree in high voltage engineering from the Indian Institute of Science in Bangalore in 1983. She came to Canada for doctoral study in engineering at the University of Waterloo, where she completed her Ph.D. in 1990.

After two years as an assistant professor at the University of Western Ontario, she returned to the University of Waterloo as a faculty member in 1992. She served as president of the Electrostatics Society of America from 2015 to 2019.

== Recognition ==
Jayaram received the Rajyotsava Prashasti, an award of the Karnataka state of India, in 1998.

She was named an IEEE Fellow in 2008, "for contributions to the use of high voltage in process technology".

The Electrostatics Society of America gave her their Distinguished Service Award in 2020, and their Lifetime Achievement Award in 2021. She was the 2023 recipient of the IEEE Industry Applications Society Outstanding Achievement Award.
