= Aindhu Laksham =

- Film title
- Directed by: G. Ramakrishnan
- Screenplay by: G. Ramakrishnan
- Story by: A. S. Muthu
- Produced by: G. Ramakrishnan; A. Ramanujam
- Starring: Gemini Ganesan; B. Saroja Devi
- Cinematography: U. Rajagopal
- Edited by: E. V. Shanmugam
- Music by: S. M. Subbaiah Naidu
- Production company: Sudha Movies
- Release date: 11 April 1969
- Country: India
- Language: Tamil

5 Laksham (transl. 5 Lakhs / Half a million) is a 1969 Indian Tamil-language comedy film written and directed by G. Ramakrishnan. The film stars Gemini Ganesan and B. Saroja Devi. It was released on 11 April 1969.

== Plot ==
Radha Krishnan is a poor young man looking for a job. Krishna is a young woman and the daughter of a millionaire, Eswaran. Radha and Krishna love each other. Eswaran is looking for a bridegroom for his daughter befitting his status. To become Eswaran's son-in-law, Radha needs five lakhs (half a million) rupees. Another person, the Zamindar of Karadiyur, also needs five lakhs rupees to settle his loans. His son, also named Radha, is in love with a poor young woman, Amudha who is the younger sister of the poor young man Radha. Radha's friend is Nachu. He is in love with Manju who wants a pet dog. So, everyone is looking for something to fulfill their need. The film is a hilarious entertainer showing what each one does to fulfill their needs.

== Cast ==
- Gemini Ganesan as Radha Krishnan
- B. Saroja Devi as Krishna
- Cho as Nachu
- Shylashri
- S. A. Ashokan
- Major Sundarrajan as Eswaran
- Manorama as Manju
- Thengai Srinivasan as Chinna Jameendar
- Sachu as Amutha (Radhakrishnan Sister)
- Radhabhai
- Kanthimathi
- Rama Rao
- Suruli Rajan as Suruttu Suruli
- I. S. R.
- K. P. Ramakrishnan
- Gemini Mahalingam
- S. P. Perumal
- Aisarivelan
- Ravindran
- Nilavai Murugesan
- Nambirajan
- Gunalan
- G. V. Sarma
- Aliyar
- Pakoda Kadhar

== Soundtrack ==
Music was composed by S. M. Subbaiah Naidu.

Song	Singer/s	Lyricist	Duration (m:ss)
"Kaadhalukkoru Kaalej"	A. L. Raghavan, L. R. Eswari	Trichy Thiyagarajan	
"Naan Paadiya Mudhal Paattu"	T. M. Soundararajan	Vaali	03:48
"Padaithan Boomiyai Iraivan"	T. M. Soundararajan, P. Susheela	Kannadasan	
"Asaipattadhu Naanalla"	T. M. Soundararajan, P. Susheela	Vaali	
"Naalaikku Neramillai"	L. R. Eswari	Kannadasan	
"Eppadi Irukkum, Ennenna Seyyum"	S. V. Ponnusamy, P. Susheela	Avinasi Mani	

== Reception ==
The film received a mixed response from viewers who felt it might have succeeded had the comedy moments been handled better.
