= Broker Bheeshmachari =

- Directed by: B. C. Srinivas
- Written by: B. C. Srinivas
- Produced by: M. S. Shivaraj
- Starring: Raja Shankar; Rajesh; Narasimharaju; Dinesh
- Cinematography: T. Yellappa
- Music by: Vasanth Kumar
- Production company: Ellbin Productions
- Release date: 1969
- Running time: 166 minutes
- Country: India
- Language: Kannada

Broker Bheeshmachari is a 1969 Indian Kannada film written and directed by B. C. Srinivas and produced by M. S. Shivaraj. The film stars Raja Shankar, Rajesh, Narasimharaju and Dinesh. It features a musical score by Vasanth Kumar.

== Cast ==
- Raja Shankar
- Rajesh
- Narasimharaju
- Dinesh
- Eshwarappa
- Jayanthi
- Shailashree
- Indira
- M. N. Lakshmi Devi
- Vijayabhanu
- Kusuma
- Shyam
- Kuppuraj
- Comedian Guggu
- Madan
- Ugranarasimha
- Puttaswamy
- Dinesh
- Siddaramanna
- B. Narayana Rao
- Prabha
- Vijayasree
- Raghavendra Rao
- Rajanikanth

== Soundtrack ==
No	Songs	Singers	Music	Lyrics
1	Broker Aade Naa	PB Srinivas & Chorus	Vasanta Kumar	BC Srinivas
2	Koliya Party Maja Nodiri	PB Srinivas & B K Sumithra, S Janaki	Vasanta Kumar	BC Srinivas
3	Kaanige Kannu Kanasagi	PB Srinivas & S Janaki	Vasanta Kumar	BC Srinivas
4	Jamaisu Jamaisu	LR Eshwari	Vasanta Kumar	BC Srinivas
5	Karunisu Baa Kareyuve Baa	BK Sumithra	Vasanta Kumar	BC Srinivas
6	Kannada Bhandavare	SP Balasubramanyam, PB Srinivas & Chorus	Vasanta Kumar	BC Srinivas
