= K. Chidananda Gowda =

Indian academic

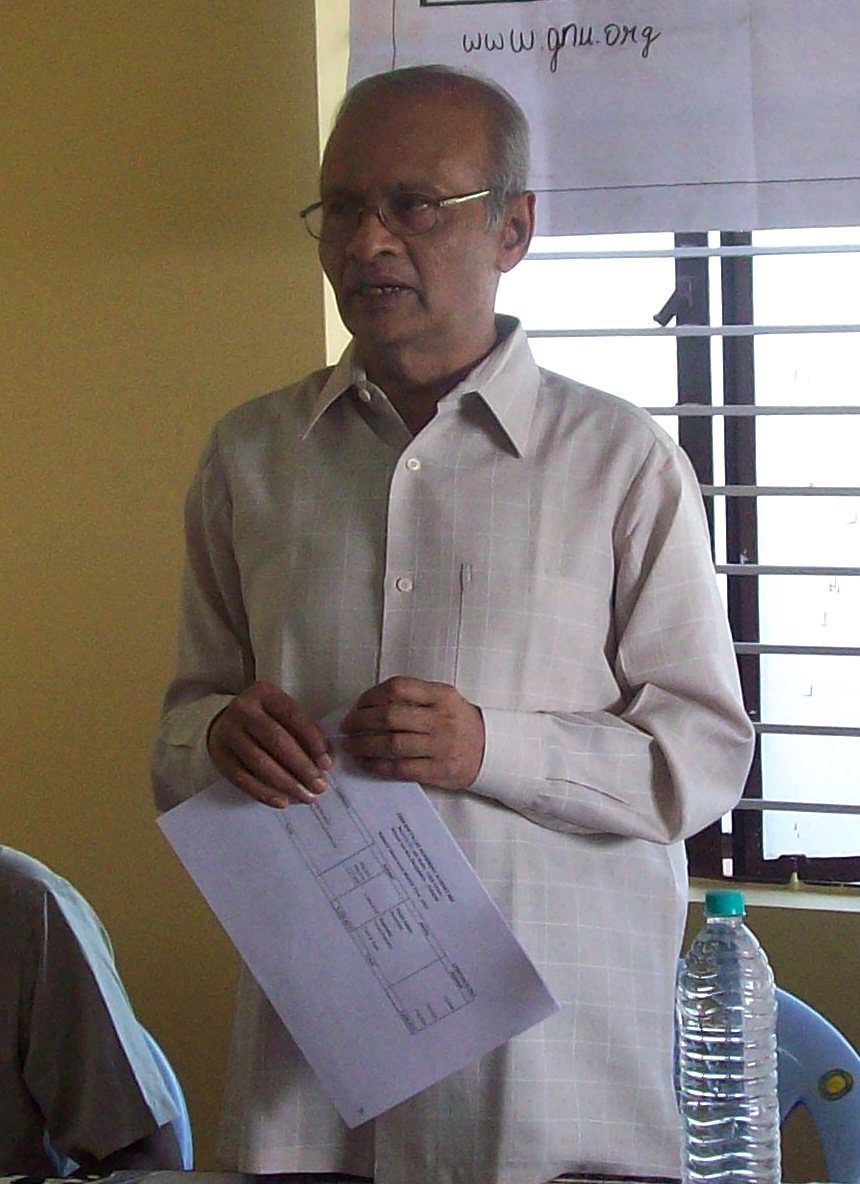
- Gowda at Free Software Movement-Karnataka office in 2011
- Born: 15 June 1942 (age 84); Chokkady, Sullia Taluka
- Education: University Visvesvaraya College of Engineering; University of Baroda; Indian Institute of Science

K. Chidananda Gowda (born 15 June 1942) is an Indian academic who served as the Vice-Chancellor of the Kuvempu University, which is located in the state of Karnataka, India. He is also the son-in-law of the Kannada Poet, Kuvempu, after whom the Kuvempu University is named. He has published many papers, mainly in the field of pattern recognition.

== Early life ==
Chidananda Gowda was born in the village of Chokkady, near Sullia on 15 June 1942. He completed his graduation in Engineering from the University Visvesvaraya College of Engineering at Bangalore in 1964. He continued his studies and obtained a Master's degree in Engineering from the Maharaja Sayajirao University of Baroda in 1969. He returned to Bangalore and completed his PhD from the Indian Institute of Science in 1979. He married Tarini, the second daughter of Kuvempu. He also spent two years at NASA in the United States and one year at INRIA in France for conducting post-doctoral research.

== Education ==
He earned his Bachelor of Engineering in 1964 from University Visveswaraya College of Engineering in Bangalore, followed by his Master of Engineering in 1969 from M.S. University of Baroda. He then received his Ph.D. in 1979 from Indian Institute of Science in Bangalore. His Post-Doctoral Research was two years with NASA in New York, USA from 1981-1983 and 1 year with INRIA in Paris, France from 1989-1990.

== Career ==
Prof. Chidananda Gowda joined the Sri Jayachamarajendra College of Engineering in Mysore as a Professor in the Computer science department and later went on to head the department. He also served as the Vice Principal of the College for about 5 years and later as the Principal for about 1.5 years. He was also a visiting professor at INRIA. He was appointed as the Vice-Chancellor of the Kuvempu University on 18 January 2002, a post which he held until 19 January 2006. He has chaired technical conferences in Zurich, Paris, Tokyo and Luxembourg. He is currently a Distinguished Professor of Computer Science at the International School of Information Management, University of Mysore, Mysore.

During his tenure as the Vice-Chancellor, he faced allegations that the University was being used as a training centre for Naxalites. He is credited to have improved the infrastructure at the University. He was also responsible for starting new departments of business administration, microbiology, biochemistry in the University. The distance education program saw a significant growth in his tenure.

He has also authored books in Kannada and English. Some of his Kannada books include Engineering Geetegalu (Engineering Songs - 1980), Putaanigala Vignyana Padyagalu (Poems on Science for kids - 1984) and Samparka Madhyamagalu (Communication media - 1999).

== Contributions to Karnataka and Kannada ==
=== Books in Kannada on Science and Technology ===
Putanigala Vignana Padyagalu (Poems in Kannada based on Science for children), Received Karnataka Sahitya Award(1986)
Engineering Gethegalu
Vijnana Vachanagalu
Pattedari Padyagalu
Tantrajna Tripadigalu
Baduku-Belaku-Chutuku-Vol.1, & Vol.2
Computer (Introductory book in Kannada)
Samparka Madhyamagalu ( Book on Electronic Communication in Kannada)

=== Kannada Software Development ===
Chief Adviser, Development of Kannada Software “Kuvempu Kannada Tantramsha” of Kannada University, Hampi, 2007
Chairman, Kannada Software Development Committee

=== Editor of Kannada Dictionary and Achchagannada Kavya ===
Accha Kannada Nudikosha (2014)
Samagra Achagannad kavya (2014)

=== President, Prathama Kannada Ganaka Sammelana ===
First President of Kannada Computer Conference organized by Kannada Sahitya Parishat, and Ganaka Parishat in Bangalore on 19,20, August, 2006.

=== New Initiatives at University Level in Karnataka ===
As Vice-Chancellor of Kuvempu University, initiated the following:

Choice Based Credit System (CBCS) at Post-graduate Level.
Semester System at Under-graduate Level.

== Positions held - earlier ==
Vice-Chancellor, Kuvempu University (18-1-2002 to 18-1-2006)
Member, Board of Governors, I.I.T. Bombay(April 2002 to March 2005)
AICTE Emeritus Professor of Computer Science
Member of the Syndicate, Jadavpur University, Calcutta (2000-2002)
Dean of Engineering, Mysore University : 2 years (1993–94)
Former Principal & Professor of Computer Science & Engg., SJCE., Mysore

== Professional recognition ==
Visiting Professor at INRIA, Paris, France (1979)
Curriculum Vita included in “ Who is Who” prepared by Classification Research, Germany
Chaired IECON Conference In Tokyo, Japan (Oct, 1984)
Charied a Conference In Zurich (Aug. 1986)
Chaired a Conference In Paris (1995)
Invited to KESDA’98 Conference, Luxembourg (1998)
Invited Talk in the ECML Conference, Pisa, Italy (2004)
Fellow of Institution of Engineers, India
AICTE Expert ( Emeritus Professor Selection, Project Review/Selection)
ISTE Visiting Professor (1992–93)

== Awards ==
In 1986 Prof. Chidananda Gowda was awarded the Kannada Sahitya Akademi award for his book, Putaanigala Vignyana Padyagalu. In 1995 he was given the M. Visveswaraya Technical Award for his contributions to engineering. In 2019 he received the Rajyotsava award.
