= Y. Subramanya Raju =

Artist (b. 1907, d. 1995)

- ವೈ. ಸುಬ್ರಹ್ಮಣ್ಯ ರಾಜು
- Born: 3 December 1907; Mysuru, Karnataka, India
- Died: 24 September 1995 (aged 87); Bengaluru, Karnataka, India
- Education: Sir J. J. School of Art
- Spouse: Smt. Sharadamma (m. 1930)
- Awards: National Award 1987; Karnataka Rajyotsava Award 1972

Y. Subramanya Raju (1907 – 1995) was an Indian artist who patronized the Mysore style of traditional art. He was born into a family of court painters in the princely state of Mysore. The Mysore Dasara Procession paintings which adorn the walls of the Kalyana Mantapa in the Mysore Palace are few of his exquisite works. In the later years, Raju involved himself with the Karnataka Chitrakala Parishath for the promotion of fine art and artists in the State. Raju spent most of his years teaching and popularizing Mysore style of art, as a recognition, Emeritus Fellowship was awarded by the Ministry of Human Resource Development and the Government of India gave its National Award for his excellence in Traditional Mysore Painting.

== Early life and family ==
Y. Subramanya Raju was born in 1907 in Mysore, Karnataka, India. Raju belonged to the Somavamsha Arya Kshatriya sect. His ancestors were exponents of the Mysore style of art. After the downfall of the Vijayanagara Empire, his ancestors migrated to the erstwhile State of Mysore. This is the same family which has the credit for having created the world famous murals in the Dariya Daulat Palace that Tipu Sultan built in Srirangapatna.

From then on the family, especially the forefathers of Y. Subramanya Raju were in the service of the Mysore palace. This service can be traced back at least three generations before Y. Subramanya Raju. His grandfather Sundarayya was a regular painter in the palace and father Yellappa was a draughtsman. Raju's brother Y. Nagaraju and uncle Shankara Raju were also artists in the palace.

When Raju was around 10 years, Sir Charles Todhunter, His Highness's private secretary had mentioned to Yellappa, Raju's father about an All-India contest for a design for a program connected with the welfare of women and children. Yellappa conveyed the message to son Raju and asked him to refer the Sri Tatva Nidhi, an old treatise on fine arts in the Palace to prepare an appropriate design. The design prepared not only won Raju an all India prize, but also recognition as a young artist of merit.

== Education ==
Y. Subramanya Raju was admitted to an Anglo Kannada School known as Raja School, established by Mummudi Krishnaraja Wadiyar. He was regular in his lessons, but was certainly more interested in drawing.

As Raju often accompanied his father or brother to the Palace, he had come to the notice of Sir Charles Todhunter. The latter with the intention of giving a surprise Christmas gift to His Highness asked Raju to prepare a design for a lampshade. The design was that of a sequence in the renowned Mysore Dasara procession. Much impressed by the design, when the gift was offered to His Highness, he was not only pleased with the design, but also inquired who the artist was. That is how the young Raju came to be presented to the Krishnaraja Wadiyar. It is according to his wish, that Raju was admitted to the Chamarajendra Technical Institute. The Maharaja also granted him a scholarship of ₹4 a month, which was later increased to ₹6.

In CTI, Raju got acquainted with the principles of perspective, balance, anatomy and proportion. Under the supervision of Keshavaiah, Raju learnt the technique of landscape painting from Tankasale and drawing from Yelavatti. Raju took a diploma in drawing, painting and designing from the technical Institute, Madras in 1926.

After joining the prestigious J.J.School, Raju passed his preliminary examination in drawing and painting with distinction. Once Raju was sent in the batch of J.J.School students to Baroda to prepare and execute the decoration for the ceiling of the Gaekwad's Palace. Later, these designs were exhibited in London under the title A representative of Indian Art Treasures in London. He completed his education here in 1930.

== Art career ==
In 1926, Y. Subramanya Raju received an assignment by the Parakala Mutt to do a portrait of Vedanta Desika. Soon after this assignment, Raju received the letter of appointment as a teacher in the CTI.

After Raju's marriage with Sharada, he was commissioned with the work of preparing a plan for Mysore City. The plan which was designed in stipulated time was greatly appreciated by His Highness and Mr. M.A. Srinivasan, the Commissioner of Mysore at the time.

The most acclaimed works of Raju are in the Kalyana Mantapa of the Mysore Palace. Of the 28 wall panels painted in Kalyana Mantapa, 6 were executed by Raju. He is also credited for designing the key sketches of all the 28 paintings in the Kalyana Mantapa.

1. No. 5: III Mysore Battalion.
2. No. 10: Coronation Elephant, Horse and Palanquin.
3. No. 18: Lord Rama worshiping arms in front of Goddess Chamundeshwari.
4. No. 24: Naupath Elephant.
5. No. 25: Rearguard horse.
6. No. 28: Elephant - pulled carriage and the ambulance.

During the Dasara Festival, on the occasion of Ayudha Pooja, the head of the Mysore royal family worships the royal arms in the Mysore Palace. This offering which is performed every year, is done in front of Y. Subramanya Raju's painting, Lord Rama worshiping arms in front of Goddess Chamundeshwari.

Raju's student M.S. Nanjunda Rao and friend M. Arya Murthy, who had established The Chitrakala Parishath (now Karnataka Chitrakala Parishath), approached Raju to join them to work for the promotion of fine art and artists in the State. In 1970, Raju joined The Parishath, at the time it was functioning in a floor of Gandhi Sahitya Sangha in Malleshwaram. Soon the Parishath undertook projects to conduct a survey of traditional paintings in the region. Nanjunda Rao also got a scheme sanctioned from The Central Handicrafts Development Board to train artists in the traditional technique, to which Raju was handed complete charge.

Paintings etched on the walls of the Jain mutt in pilgrim town Shravanabelagola have remained an integral part of its culture, depicting the community's way of life 200 years ago. Eleven senior artists, Murugappa Chetti, Y Subramanya Raju, S S Kukke, M E Guru, S Kalappa, S R Swamy, V T Kale, Pushpa Dravid, Kalidas Pattar, M S Nanjunda Rao and M J Kamalakshi were commissioned by The Karnataka Lalitha Kala Academy in 1971 to reproduce these paintings, which were surrounding the events connected to the 24th Tirthankara. As a result, a total of 96 paintings were commissioned in 1971 and 1978.

== Awards and honours ==
- Gold Medal for "Dasara Exhibition Poster" in the Mysore Dasara Exhibition 1931.
- Silver Medal in "Landscape" category in the Mysore Dasara Exhibition in 1931.
- Silver Medal in "Water color" category in the Mysore Dasara Exhibition in 1931.
- Gold Medal in the Travancore Chitra Tirunal I.C. Exhibition in 1931.
- "Huskur Channa Basappa's prize" by Mysore Fine Art Society in 1931.
- "O.V. Mullers memorial fund prize" by Bombay Art Society in 1931.
- Madras Fine Art Society award in 1931.
- Gold Medal in the Bangalore Kalamandir Exhibition in 1932.
- Simla Fine Art Society award in 1932.
- "H.H. The Yuvaraja Prize" for the best work by a Mysore Artist in 1935.
- Silver Medal by Government of India for Census work as Enumerator in 1953.
- Mysore State Lalithakala academy prize in 1962.
- The Honor of Karnataka Chitrakala Parishath in 1971
- The State Award (Karnataka Rajyotsava Award) presented by Former Chief Minister of Karnataka Shri D. Devaraj Urs in 1972.
- The Somavamsha Arya Kshatriya Samaja conferred the title "Chitrakala Praveena" in 1973.
- The Karnataka Lalithakala Academy Annual award in 1977.
- The State Youth Writers and Artists Guild, Bangalore honor in 1977.
- The All India Fine Arts and Crafts Society award in 1985.
- "Emeritus Fellowship" from the Ministry of Human Resource Development in 1986.
- "National Award for his excellence in traditional Mysore Painting" by Government of India presented by Former President of India Shri R.Venkataraman in 1987.
- Felicitation by Former President of India Shri Neelam Sanjiva Reddy at Karnataka Chitrakala Parishath in 1989.
- "Svetoslav Roerich Award" by Roerich Art Centre presented by Smt. Devikarani Roerich in 1993.

== Books ==
Following Books have been written about Y. Subramanya Raju.

- Y. Subramanya Raju: A biography by S.N.Chandrashekar, published by Karnataka Lalithakala Academy in 1987.
- Chitragarudiga Y. Subramanya Raju, published by Karnataka Chitrakala Parishath in 2008.
- Y. Subramanya Raju Centenary celebration, published by Karnataka Chitrakala Parishath in 2008.
- ಹಿರಿಯ ಕಲಾವಿದರ ಶತಮಾನೋತ್ಸವ, published by Karnataka Lalithakala Academy in 2011.
