= Pennai Vazha Vidungal =

1969 film by R. Devarajan

- Poster
- Directed by: R. Devarajan
- Produced by: M. Karnan
- Starring: Jaishankar; K. R. Vijaya
- Cinematography: M. Karnan
- Edited by: R. Devarajan
- Music by: S. M. Subbaiah Naidu
- Production company: Vijaya Chithra Films
- Release date: 1 August 1969
- Country: India
- Language: Tamil

Pennai Vazha Vidungal (transl. Let the woman live) is a 1969 Indian Tamil-language drama film directed and edited by R. Devarajan, and produced by M. Karnan who also handled the cinematography. It was released on 1 August 1969, and emerged as a commercial success.

== Plot ==
The film revolves around the change of heart of a wayward husband due to his submissive but just wife who, as a lawyer, fights for the rights of her bigamous husband's other wife who has been deceived and maligned due to his promiscuity. The other woman eventually dies, thereby allowing the family to remain intact.

== Cast ==
- Jaishankar as Anand
- K. R. Vijaya Amudha
- Sheela as Shanathi
- Nagesh as Natarajan
- M. R. R. Vasu as Vasu
- V. K. Ramasamy as Singarapillai
- S. V. Sahasranamam
- V. S. Raghavan
- M. S. Sundari Bai
- O. A. K. Thevar
- Shylashri as Shyla
- Vijayachandrika as Parvathi
- Ramamoorthy as Nagarajan
- Karikol Raju as Chithambaram

== Production ==
Pennai Vazha Vidungal, made under the Vijaya Chithra Films banner, is the inaugural production of M. Karnan who also handled the cinematography. The film was directed by R. Devarajan who also handled the editing.

== Soundtrack ==
The soundtrack was composed by S. M. Subbaiah Naidu, and the lyrics were written by Kannadasan.

Track listing
No.	Title	Singer(s)	Length
1.	"Nenje Unakkoru Virunthu"	P. Susheela, T. M. Soundararajan
2.	"Madhu Iranga"	T. M. Soundararajan, Kusala
3.	"Samaiyalukkum Maiyalukkum"	P. Susheela, T. M. Soundararajan
4.	"Azhagile"	L. R. Eswari

== Release and reception ==
Pennai Vazha Vidungal was released on 1 August 1969, and emerged a commercial success. The Indian Express wrote, "The movie has many an interesting melodramatic moment."

== Bibliography ==
- Pillai, Swarnavel Eswaran (24 April 2015). "Tamil B Movie Westerns: The Global South and Genre Subversion". The Western in the Global South. Routledge. ISBN 978-1-315-73113-1.
