= Kuvempu University =

State University in Karnataka

Coordinates: 13°55′0.12″N 75°34′0.12″E

- Jnana Sahyadri
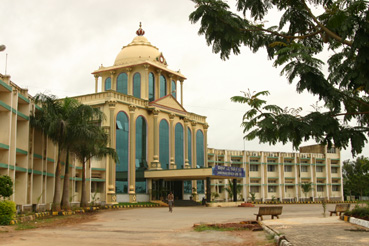
- Former name: Sahyadri University
- Motto in English: "Foster Creativity in Teaching"
- Type: Public
- Established: 1987; 39 years ago
- Accreditation: NAAC
- Academic affiliations: UGC; AIU; ACU; AICTE; BCI
- Chancellor: Governor of Karnataka
- Vice-Chancellor: Sharath Ananthamurthy
- Director: Kumara Chalya
- Faculty: 248
- Postgraduates: 2,917
- Doctoral students: 145
- Location: Shankaraghattta, Bhadravati, Karnataka, India
- Campus: Rural, 230 acres (93 ha) (Main campus)
- Website: www.kuvempu.ac.in

Kuvempu University is a public state university in Shankaraghattta, Bhadravathi taluk, Shivamogga, Karnataka, India. It was established in 1987 by the act of the Karnataka state legislature through amendment No. 28/1976 dated 29 January 1989 under the Karnataka State University Act 1976. The university offers undergraduate and graduate degree programs in wide range of disciplines. It was recognized by the UGC in 1994 and is a member of the Association of Indian Universities (AIU).

The university has its headquarters at Jnana Sahyadri Campus, Shivamogga. Its campus is called Jnana Sahyadri, which means 'The Western Ghat section of knowledge'. It has university jurisdiction over malnad districts of Shivamogga and Chikmagaluru, through which the Sahyadri mountain ranges pass. The campus sprawls across an area of 230 acres. The campus has an admixture of wild and domestic animals.

== History ==
Vice chancellors
- Shanthinatha K. Desai, 1988–1990
- M. R. Gajendragad, 1991–1996
- P. Venkataramaiah, 1996–1999
- S. P. Hiremath, 1999–2002
- K. Chidananda Gowda, 2001–2006
- Bailure Sheena Sherigara, 2006–2010
- Syed A. Bari, 2010–2014
- T.R Manjunath, 2014–2015
- Prof. Jogan Shankar, 2015–2019
- Dr. B. P. Veerabhadrappa, 2019–present

Established on 29 June 1987, Kuvempu University is the youngest of the affiliating universities in Karnataka State. It was named after the great Kannada writer, Kuvempu, Jnanpith laureate & doyen of Kannada literature. He was native of Shivamogga district and vice-chancellor of University of Mysore. Kuvempu hailed from the Malenadu region. He enunciated the statement 'Vishwamanawasandesha' — A word of advice on the doctrine of Universal Manhood. True to its form and nature the university had adopted Kannada as the administrative and official language.

Kuvempu's son-in-law K. Chidananda Gowda was the vice-chancellor from 2001 to 2006. The current vice-chancellor is Dr. B. P. Veerabhadrappa.

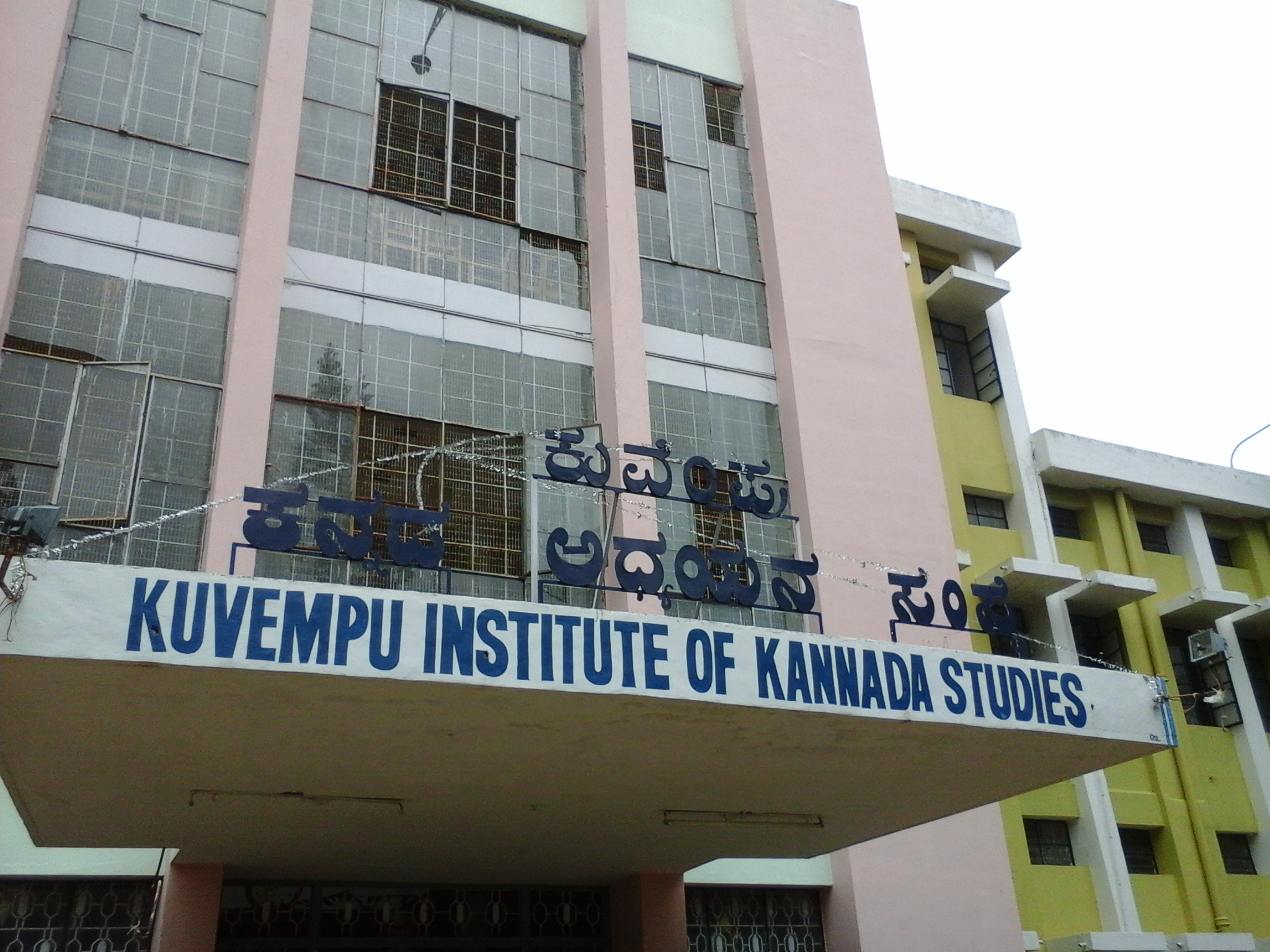
kuvempu institute for Kannada studies

== Academics ==
The university has 59 post-graduate departments of studies in the faculties of Arts, Science, Commerce, Education and Law offering 45 post-graduate (PG) programmes, four PG diplomas (regular) and one undergraduate programme. There are many colleges affiliated to this university offering undergraduate courses in the above-mentioned faculties.

The academic wedge on the main campus houses the post-graduate departments of studies in English, Political Science, Hindi, Sanskrit, Urdu, MSW, Economics, Sociology, English Language Teaching, Journalism and Mass Communication.

The department of Sanskrit was moved out of Janasahyadri campus in Shankaraghatta village into the Sahyadri College in Shivamogga City due to lack of student strength. The VC insisted the course to run as he was reluctant to squander an Arts course to non-existence despite socially valued in urban places. The university has a strict mandate to close a course if a minimum number of students don't buy seats for a number of years from the state government.

Library & Information Science is in the Library departments and in Computer Science Departments Mathematics, MCA and Electronics. Pharmaceutical Chemistry has started on the premises of Govt. Junior College.

A new Post-Graduate Centre at Kadur started from the academic year 2007–08 with three courses: Master of Business Economics (MBE), Master of Business Administration (MBA) and M.Sc. To establish the PG Centre at Kadur, the State Government allotted 65 acres (260,000 m^{2}) of land adjacent to Kadur town and released Rs.2 crore for the development of the P.G. Centre. A B.Sc. ITIM course that focuses on IT Infrastructure Management was introduced in Distance Mode in 2002. This is aligned to the needs of the rapidly growing IMS industry.

=== Libraries ===
The library offers facilities for reading, borrowing, and reference to the students, teachers and research scholars of all departments. Over 70,000 books and 4,000 archived periodicals are available. The library has kept pace with technology by introducing a CD-ROM database and Internet and e-mail facilities. The library provides facilities for self-directed student learning outside standard university hours.

=== National Service Scheme (NSS) ===
Kuvempu University NSS section is a part of the Karnataka State. There is a programme coordinator whose office is presently housed in front of the Sahyadri College, Shivamogga. The NSS wing provides training to undergraduate students by organising annual camps, national camps, and socially useful programmes. It coordinates the adult literacy programmes in which the students participate actively. The post-graduate unit of NSS has students from the post-graduate departments on the campus. It is supervised by a co-ordinator (from the faculty) and his team.

=== Rankings ===
University and College rankings

General – international
- QS (Asia) (2022): 551-600

General – India
- NIRF (Overall) (2021): 101–150
- NIRF (Universities) (2021): 81

The university was ranked 81st among universities in India by the National Institutional Ranking Framework (NIRF) in 2021 and in the 101–150 band overall.

== See also ==
- List of institutions of higher education in Karnataka
- List of universities in India
- Universities and colleges in India
- Education in India
