= S. Narmada =

Indian Bharatanatyam exponent

- Born: 22 September 1942; Bangalore, British India
- Died: 30 March 2007 (aged 64); Bangalore, Karnataka, India
- Occupations: Dancer, Dance Teacher
- Known for: Bharatanatyam
- Awards: Sangeet Natak Akademi Award; Rajyotsava Prashasti Karnataka Sangeeta Nritya Academy Award – Shantala Natya Sri Award

S. Narmada (22 September 1942 – 30 March 2007) popularly known as Guru Narmada was a Bharatanatyam exponent and teacher from Karnataka, India. She received several awards including Sangeet Natak Akademi Award, Karnataka Sangeeta Nritya Academy Award, Rajyotsava Prashasti and Shantala Natya Sri Award.

== Biography ==
S. Narmada was born on 22 September 1942 in Bangalore, Karnataka. She received her basic training in dance from V. S. Kaushik. As a prominent disciple of K. P. Kittappa Pillai, she had practiced Tanjavur style of Bharatanatyam under his tutelage for more than two decades.

An excellent teacher of Bharatanatyam, Narmada started the Shakuntala Dance School in Bangalore in 1978 in memory of her mother, and has trained many nationally recognized dancers. Her disciples include Lakshmi Gopalaswamy, Manju Bhargavi, Sathyanarayan Raju, Nirupama Rajendra, Malathi Iyengar, Praveen and Anuradha Vikranth.

Narmada died of a heart attack in Bangalore on 30 March 2007 at the age of 64.

== Awards and honors ==
- Sangeet Natak Akademi Award 2006
- Karnataka Sangeeta Nritya Academy Award 1998
- Rajyotsava Prashasti 1996
- Best Teacher Award of the Madras Music Academy 1992
- Shantala Natya Sri Award 2001 from the Government of Karnataka
- Bestow Award from the Karnataka Cultural Association, California
