= Suvarna Bhoomi =

- Directed by: A. M. Sameevulla
- Written by: Ku Ra Seetharama Shastry (dialogues)
- Screenplay by: A. M. Sameevulla
- Story by: A. M. Sameevulla
- Produced by: A. M. Sameevulla
- Starring: Rajesh; Sudarshan; Dinesh; Shakthi Prasad
- Cinematography: K. Janakiram
- Edited by: P. Bhakthavathsalam
- Music by: Vijaya Bhaskar
- Production company: Bawa Movies
- Distributed by: Bawa Movies
- Release date: 20 December 1968
- Running time: 132 min
- Country: India
- Language: Kannada

Suvarna Bhoomi is a 1969 Indian Kannada film, directed by A. M. Sameevulla and produced by A. M. Sameevulla. The film stars Rajesh, Sudarshan, Pandari Bai Dinesh and Shakthi Prasad in lead roles. The film had musical score by Vijaya Bhaskar. The plot line where the elder brother is a thief and younger brother is a police officer whilst the elder brother dying in the arms of the mother after being shot in the climax along with mother sentiment sequences could be seen in later films such as the 1975 movie Deewaar.

== Cast ==
- Rajesh
- Sudarshan
- Dinesh
- Shakti Prasad
- M. S. Sathya
- Hanumanthachar
- Pandari Bai
- Udayachandrika
- Shailashree
- Tara
- Master Rajkumar
- Master Krishnakumar
- Master Srinivas
- Baby Dhivyamani
- Thoogudeepa Srinivas
- Subba Rao
- Phailwan Siddu
- Gajendra
- Srirang
- Madangopal
- Sathyaprakash
