= List of Tamil films of 1977 =

Post-amendment to the Tamil Nadu Entertainments Tax Act 1939 on 1 April 1958, Gross jumped to 140 per cent of Nett Commercial Taxes Department disclosed ₹14.99 crore in entertainment tax revenue for the year.

The following is a list of films produced in the Tamil film industry in India in 1977, in alphabetical order.

== 1977 ==
| Title | Director | Production | Music | Cast |
|---|---|---|---|---|
| 16 Vayathinile | Bharathiraja | Sri Amman Creations | Ilaiyaraaja | Kamal Haasan, Sridevi, Rajinikanth |
| Aadu Puli Attam | S. P. Muthuraman | Swarnambika Productions | Vijaya Bhaskar | Kamal Haasan, Sripriya, Rajinikanth, Sangeetha, Thengai Srinivasan |
| Aalukkoru Aasai | S. P. Muthuraman | Cine Enterprises | Ilaiyaraaja | R. Muthuraman, Jayachitra, Kavitha, Thengai Srinivasan |
| Aaru Pushpangal | K. M. Balakrishnan | Ashtalakshmi Pictures | M. S. Viswanathan | Vijayakumar, Srividya, Rajinikanth, Y.Vijaya |
| Aasai Manaivi | K. Sornam | Suryalaya Productions | Shankar–Ganesh | Jaishankar, Sujatha, Bhavani |
| Aattukara Alamelu | R. Thyagarajan | Dhandayudhapani Films | Shankar–Ganesh | Sivakumar, Sripriya, Jai Ganesh, Kavitha |
| Agraharathil Kazhutai | John Abraham | Nirmiti Films | M. B. Sreenivasan | M. B. Sreenivasan, Swathi, Srilalitha |
| Andru Sinthiya Ratham | R. Sundaram | Geetha Chitra Productions | V. Kumar | Jaishankar, Padmapriya, Thengai Srinivasan, Asogan, Manorama, Murthy |
| Annan Oru Koyil | K. Vijayan | Sivaji Productions | M. S. Viswanathan | Sivaji Ganesan, Sujatha, Sumithra, Jai Ganesh |
| Avan Oru Sarithiram | K. S. Prakash Rao | Gomathi Sankar Pictures | M. S. Viswanathan | Sivaji Ganesan, Kanchana, Cho |
| Avar Enakke Sontham | Pattu | P. A. Productions | Ilaiyaraaja | Jaishankar, Srividya, Fatafat Jayalaxmi, Thengai Srinivasan, Y. Vijaya |
| Avargal | K. Balachander | Kalakendra Movies | M. S. Viswanathan | Kamal Haasan, Sujatha, Rajinikanth, Kumari Padmini, Kutty Padmini |
| Balaparitchai | V. Srinivasan | Muktha Films | T. M. Soundararajan | R. Muthuraman, Jai Ganesh, Sujatha, Prameela, Cho, Manorama, Y. Vijaya |
| Bhuvana Oru Kelvi Kuri | S. P. Muthuraman | M. A. M. Films | Ilaiyaraaja | Sivakumar, Rajinikanth, Sumithra, Jaya Guhanathan |
| Chakravarthy | Krishnan–Panju | P. V. T. Productions | V. Kumar | Jaishankar, Sharada, Sripriya, Srikanth, Thengai Srinivasan, Y. Vijaya |
| Chollu Kanna Chollu | T. N. Thirumalaisamy Nadar | T. R. I. Films | Bose & Deva | |
| Deviyin Thirumanam | P. Madhavan | Santhi Chithra Productions | M. S. Viswanathan | R. Muthuraman, K. R. Vijaya, Prameela, Padmapriya |
| Dheepam | K. Vijayan | Suresh Arts | Ilaiyaraaja | Sivaji Ganesan, Sujatha, Vijayakumar, Sangeetha, Nagesh |
| Durga Devi | Ra. Sankaran | Devipriya Creations | Ilaiyaraaja | Sivakumar, Srividya |
| Ellam Avale | Amirtham | Marina Movies | M. S. Viswanathan | M. K. Muthu, Vennira Aadai Nirmala, Chandrakala |
| Enna Thavam Seithen | Krishnan–Panju | Nalantha Movies | M. S. Viswanathan | Vijayakumar, Sujatha, Sathyapriya |
| Gaslight Mangamma | N. S. Maniam | Maniam Pictures | M. S. Viswanathan | Jaishankar, K. R. Vijaya, Srikanth, Shubha, Thengai Srinivasan |
| Gayathri | R. Pattabiraman | Vijaya Meena Films | Ilaiyaraaja | Jaishankar, Sridevi, Rajinikanth, Rajasulochana |
| Ilaya Thalaimurai | Krishnan–Panju | Yoga Chitra Productions | M. S. Viswanathan | Sivaji Ganesan, Vanisri, Vijayakumar, Nagesh |
| Indru Pol Endrum Vaazhga | K. Shankar | Subbu Productions | M. S. Viswanathan | M. G. Ramachandran, Radha Saluja, Vijayakumar, Vennira Aadai Nirmala, Thengai Srinivasan |
| Kalamadi Kalam | Gopu | Rajapriya Productions | Vijaya Bhaskar | Jaishankar, Kavitha, Srikanth, Thengai Srinivasan, Sachu, Vennira Aadai Moorthy, Manorama, P. R. Varalakshmi, Lavanya |
| Kavikkuyil | Devaraj–Mohan | S. P. T. Films | Ilaiyaraaja | Sivakumar, Sridevi, Fatafat Jayalaxmi, Rajinikanth |
| Madhurageetham | V. C. Guhanathan | Sri Venkatalakshmi Productions | Chandrabose | Vijayakumar, Srividya, Sripriya, Suruli Rajan, Sachu |
| Maamiyar Veedu | N. Krishnamurthy | Ramraj Movies | M. S. Viswanathan | Jaishankar, Vennira Aadai Nirmala |
| Mazhai Megam | A. S. Prakasam | Saradha Arts | K. V. Mahadevan | R. Muthuraman, Sharada, Srikanth |
| Meenava Nanban | C. V. Sridhar | Muthu Enterprises | M. S. Viswanathan | M. G. Ramachandran, Latha, Vennira Aadai Nirmala, Nagesh, Thengai Srinivasan, Sachu |
| Munnooru Naal | S. S. Devadas | Deva Art Films | | Thengai Srinivasan, P. R. Varalakshmi |
| Murugan Adimai | R. Thyagarajan | C. F. Trust | K. V. Mahadevan | R. Muthuraman, K. R. Vijaya, Vijayakumar, A. V. M. Rajan, Nagesh, Thengai Srinivasan, Jaya Guhanathan, A. Sakunthala |
| Naam Pirandha Mann | A. Vincent | Vijaya Arts | M. S. Viswanathan | Sivaji Ganesan, Gemini Ganesan, K. R. Vijaya, Kamal Haasan, Fatafat Jayalaxmi, Nagesh |
| Nallathukku Kalamillai | T. N. Balu | Thozhilalar Films | Shankar–Ganesh | Jaishankar, Sripriya, Srikanth, Sunderajan, Sukumari, Asogan, Suruli Rajan |
| Nandha En Nila | A. Jagannathan | Ramya Cine Arts | V. Dakshinamoorthy | Vijayakumar, Sumithra, Fatafat Jayalaxmi |
| Navarathinam | A. P. Nagarajan | C. N. V. Movies | Kunnakudi Vaidyanathan | M. G. Ramachandran, Latha, Jayachitra, Sripriya, Zarina Wahab, Jaya Guhanathan, Y. Vijaya, Shubha, 'Kumari' Padmini, P. R. Varalakshmi |
| Nee Vazha Vendum | A. Bhimsingh | Fathima Amudha Combines | M. S. Viswanathan | R. Muthuraman, Ravichandran, Bharathi, Sumithra, Nagesh |
| Odi Vilaiyaadu Thatha | T. N. Balu | K. P. K. Films | Ilaiyaraaja | Srikanth, Sripriya, V. K. Ramasamy, Manorama, Suruli Rajan |
| Olimayamana Ethirkaalam | K. Krishnamurthy | Sri Chitra Mahal Productions | Vijaya Bhaskar | Vijayakumar, Sripriya, Sowcar Janaki |
| Oruvanukku Oruthi | Ra. Sankaran | Babu Movies | V. Kumar | Jaishankar, Lakshmi, Thengai Srinivasan, Y. G. Mahendran, Bhavani |
| Palabishegham | K. S. Gopalakrishnan | Kalavalli Combines | Shankar–Ganesh | Jaishankar, Sripriya, Srikanth, Thengai Srinivasan |
| Pattina Pravesam | K. Balachander | Premalaya Productions | M. S. Viswanathan | Jai Ganesh, Sarath Babu, Sivachandran, Delhi Ganesh, Meera, Swarna, Jayasri |
| Penn Jenmam | A. C. Tirulokchandar | Cine Bharath Productions | Ilaiyaraaja | R. Muthuraman, Jaya Prabha, Prakash, Jayamalini, Seema |
| Pennai Solli Kutramillai | S. P. Muthuraman | R. V. Films | M. S. Viswanathan | Sivakumar, Fatafat Jayalaxmi, Srikanth, Y. Vijaya |
| Perumaikkuriyaval | Ra. Sankaran | Gomathi Sankar Productions | M. S. Viswanathan | Sivakumar, Padmapriya, Fatafat Jayalaxmi, Srikanth, Manorama, Thengai, Sreenivasan |
| Punidha Anthoniyar | Nanjil Durai | Jayashri Nanjil Incorporation | M. S. Viswanathan | R. Muthuraman, Lakshmi, Jayachitra, Major Sundarrajan, Savitri, Thengai Srinivasan, Srikanth, Prameela |
| Punniyam Seithaval | K. S. Gopalakrishnan | Ravi Combines | M. S. Viswanathan | R. Muthuraman, Vijayakumar, Sripriya, Fatafat Jayalaxmi, Thengai Srinivasan, Sukumari, P. R. Varalakshmi |
| Raghupathi Raghavan Rajaram | Durai | Sri Uma Chitra Productions | Shankar–Ganesh | Vijayakumar, Rajinikanth, Sumithra, Y. Vijaya |
| Rasi Nalla Rasi | Gopu | Sasura Combines | Vijaya Bhaskar | Jaishankar, Vidhubala |
| Rowdy Rakkamma | K. S. Gopalakrishnan | Jai Geetha Productions | Shankar–Ganesh | Jaishankar, Srividya, Kavitha, Nagesh |
| Sainthadamma Sainthadu | Devaraj–Mohan | Padmasri Combines | Ilaiyaraaja | Sivakumar, Sridevi, Meera, Sunderajan, Thengai Sreenivasan, Puspalatha |
| Sathiyavan Savithri Dubbed from Malayalam | P. G. Viswambaran | Sri Vardhini Productions | G. Devarajan | Kamal Haasan, Sridevi, Adoor Bhasi, Thikkurissy Sukumaran Nair, Kaviyoor Ponnamma, Sankaradi |
| Sila Nerangalil Sila Manithargal | A. Bhimsingh | A. B. S. Productions | M. S. Viswanathan | Lakshmi, Srikanth, Nagesh |
| Sonthamadi Nee Enakku | S. P. Muthuraman | Jai Geetha Productions | V. Kumar | Jaishankar, Sripriya, Rajasulochana, Srikanth Sundarrajan, Surulirajan |
| Sonnathai Seiven | Krishnan–Panju | Geetha Arts | V. Kumar | Sivakumar, Sujatha, Bhavani |
| Sorgam Naragam | R. Thyagarajan | Dhandayudhapani Films | Shankar–Ganesh | Sivakumar, Fatafat Jayalaxmi, Vijayakumar, Padmapriya, Nagesh, Sunderajan, Thengai Sreenivasan |
| Sri Krishna Leela | A. P. Nagarajan | Sri Umaiyambikai Pictures | S. V. Venkatraman | Sivakumar, Jayalalitha, Srividya, T. R. Mahalingam, Major Sundarrajan, C. R. Vijayakumari |
| Thaliya Salangaiya | T. R. Ramanna | Prosperity Pictures | K. V. Mahadevan | R. Muthuraman, Vanisri, Asokan, M.N.Rajam, Sunderajan, S.V.Suppaya |
| Thanikudithanam | S. A. Kannan | Sri Shanmugamani Films | M. S. Viswanathan | K. R. Vijaya, Cho, V. K. Ramasamy, Major Sundarrajan, Pandari Bai, Sangeetha, Y. G. Mahendra |
| Thoondil Meen | Ra. Sankaran | Sudarsan Enterprises | V. Kumar | Mohan Sharma, Lakshmi |
| Thunai Iruppal Meenakshi | Valampuri Somanathan | S. P. V. Films | Ilaiyaraaja | Sivakumar, Vijayakumar, Sujatha, Swarna, Vijaya Chandrika |
| Unnai Suttrum Ulagam | G. Subramaniam | Sri Navaneetha Films | Shankar–Ganesh | Jayalalitha, Savitri, KamalHasan, Vijayakumar, Vidhubala, Prameela |
| Uyarnthavargal | T. N. Balu | Rasaleela Pictures | Shankar–Ganesh | Kamal Haasan, Sujatha, Thengai Srinivasan |
