= Engalukkum Kaalam Varum =

Engalukkum Kaalam Varum may refer to:

- Engalukkum Kalam Varum (1967 film)
- Engalukkum Kaalam Varum (2001 film)
