= Master Prabhakar =

Indian cinematographer

- Born: 28 February 1957 (age 69); Madurai, Tamil Nadu
- Occupations: Actor; Technician
- Years active: 1967-2002
- Relatives: Sumathi (sister)

Master Prabhakar (born Prabhakar) is an Indian actor, who primarily worked in Tamil and Hindi cinema, and a few Telugu and Kannada films and acted in about 60 programmes for Doordarshan, between 1977 and 1987. He has also worked as a technician for Hindi films. He made his acting debut with the Tamil film Devalayam directed by G. R. Nathan, and starred in 150 feature films. After he left acting, he was reportedly the first to open a color xerox store in Chennai.

== Personal life ==
Prabhakar was born in Madurai, a city in Tamil Nadu, India. His mother tongue is Saurashtra. His father and mother were originally from Madurai. His father managed several businesses such as photo studio and printing press. His mother was a housewife, taking care of his sister Sumathi and his other six brothers and three sisters. Prabakhar was the first one in the family to enter the film industry. In 1966, Prabahakar along with Sumathi moved in with his aunt to pursue his dreams.

== Selected filmography ==
Tamil

- Sadhu Mirandal (1966)
- Marakka Mudiyumaa? (1966)
- Bama Vijayam (1967)
- Engalukkum Kalam Varum (1967)
- Moondrezhuthu (1968)
- Thamarai Nenjam (1968)
- Anbu Vazhi (1968)
- Vaa Raja Vaa (1969) (as Master Prabhakar)
- Iru Kodugal (1969)
- Enga Mama (1970) as Aasath
- Maanavan (1970)
- Anadhai Anandhan (1970)
- Thirumalai Thenkumari (1970) as Ramani

Hindi

- Mujrim Kaun? (1968)
- Baal Mahabharat (1973) (as Master Prabhakar)
- Anamika (1973)
- Fakira (1976)
- Susheela (1977)
- Adi Manav (1977)
- Purana Purush (1978)
- Ghar (1978)
- Shriman Shrimati (1982)
- Angoor (1982)
- Jasoos 999 (1983)

Telugu

- Balaraju Katha (1970) (as Master Prabhakar)
- Bala Bharatam (1972) (as Master Prabhakar)
- Meena (1973) (as Master Prabhakar) as Young Krishna Rao
- Pralaya Rudrudu (1982)
- Devi Abhayam (2005)

Kannada

- Sahasa Simha (1982)
- Thayi Mamathe (1985)
- Premaloka (1987) (Guest Appearance)
- Karulina Koogu (1994)

As technician

- Guide (1965) (assistant camera)
- Jewel Thief (1967) (assistant operative cameraman)
- Mera Naam Joker (1968) (assistant camera)
- Johny Mera Naam (1970) (assistant camera)
- Man Mandir (1971) (assistant camera)
- Bombay to Goa (1972) (camera operator)
- Karmayogi (1978) (assistant camera)
- Love in Goa (1983) (assistant camera)
- Lorie (1984) (light boy)
- Parinda (1989) (electrician: N.C. Cine)
- Khiladi (1992) (lighting technician)
- Prem Yog (1994) (lighting technician)
- Badmaash (1998) (spot boy)
- Awara Paagal Deewana (2002) (lighting technician)
