= Vaa Raja Vaa =

1969 film by A. P. Nagarajan

- Poster
- Directed by: A. P. Nagarajan
- Written by: A. P. Nagarajan
- Produced by: A. P. Nagarajan
- Starring: Master Prabhakar
- Cinematography: W. R. Subba Rao
- Edited by: T. R. Nagarajan
- Music by: Kunnakudi Vaidyanathan
- Production company: CNV Productions
- Release date: 6 December 1969
- Running time: 152 minutes
- Country: India
- Language: Tamil

Vaa Raja Vaa (transl. Come Raja, Come) is a 1969 Indian Tamil-language children's film written, directed and produced by A. P. Nagarajan for CNV Productions. The film features an ensemble cast including Master Prabhakar, Baby Sumathi, Sirkazhi Govindarajan, V. S. Raghavan, K. D. Santhanam and Suruli Rajan. It was released on 6 December 1969 and became a commercial success. The film was remade in Telugu as Balaraju Katha (1970), with Prabhakar reprising his role.

== Plot ==
Raja is a 10-year-old boy in Mahabalipuram. To support his family that lives in abject poverty, he becomes a tourist guide. An elderly sculptor has a small rock sculpture tablet on which are engraved adages. Raja enters a discussion with him, wondering if those pearls of wisdom still hold relevance. The sculptor tells him that the sayings are eternal and immortal. Unconvinced, Raja sets out to find the truth for himself. Ultimately, he realises that all those sayings are still valid.

== Cast ==
- Master Prabhakar as Raja
- Baby Sumathi as Raja's sister
- Sirkazhi Govindarajan as a police officer disguised as a sage
- V. S. Raghavan
- K. D. Santhanam as the elder sculptor
- Suruli Rajan as a friendly police officer

== Production ==
In addition to writing and directing, A. P. Nagarajan also produced Vaa Raja Vaa under his company CNV Productions. W. R. Subba Rao was the cinematographer, while T. R. Nagarajan was the editor. Since it was previously believed in the Tamil film industry that A. P. Nagarajan's films were successful only because of their star cast and "mammoth" scales, rather than his directorial skills, he directed this film, which featured mostly newcomers, to silence his critics. It was also one of his rare films to have a contemporary setting, since he was then known primarily for directing films based on Hindu mythology. The film was shot entirely on location in Mahabalipuram.

== Soundtrack ==
The music was composed by Kunnakudi Vaidyanathan, marking his cinematic debut. The lyrics were written by Nellai Arulmani, Poovai Senguttuvan, Ulundurpettai Shanmugham and Azha Valliappa.

Tracklist
No.	Title	Singer(s)	Length
1.	"Kallellaam"	L. R. Eswari	03:34
2.	"Aadi Paadi Sirikka"	L. R. Eswari, S. Sarala, M. R. Vijaya, L. R. Anjali	04:57
3.	"Unmai Ethu Poy Ethu"	L. R. Eswari	03:43
4.	"Iraivan Padai Tha"	Sirkazhi Govindarajan	03:31
5.	"Kallamilla Pillaiyidam"	Sirkazhi Govindarajan	03:44
Total length:			19:29

== Release and reception ==
Vaa Raja Vaa was released on 6 December 1969. The film was a commercial success, running for over 100 days in theatres. In a review dated 21 December 1969, the Tamil magazine Ananda Vikatan praised the performances of the cast. The film was remade in Telugu as Balaraju Katha (1970), with Prabhakar reprising his role.

== Bibliography ==
- Baskaran, S. Theodore (1996). The eye of the serpent: an introduction to Tamil cinema. East West Books. p. 185. OCLC 1129458207.
- Rajadhyaksha, Ashish; Willemen, Paul (1998) [1994]. Encyclopaedia of Indian Cinema. British Film Institute and Oxford University Press. ISBN 0-19-563579-5.
- Thoraval, Yves (2000). The cinemas of India. India: Macmillan. ISBN 0-333-93410-5.
