= Sattam En Kaiyil =

1978 Indian film directed by T.N Balu

- Poster
- Directed by: T. N. Balu
- Written by: T. N. Balu
- Produced by: T. N. Balu
- Starring: Kamal Haasan; Sripriya; Elizabeth
- Cinematography: N. K. Viswanathan
- Edited by: V. Rajagopal
- Music by: Ilaiyaraaja
- Production company: Balu Cine Arts
- Distributed by: Sri Shal Movies
- Release date: 14 July 1978
- Running time: 127 minutes
- Country: India
- Language: Tamil

Sattam En Kaiyil (transl. The law is in my hands) is a 1978 Indian Tamil-language action film written, produced and directed by T. N. Balu. The film stars Kamal Haasan and Sripriya, while Sathyaraj made his screen debut. It was released on 14 July 1978 and became a success. The film was remade in Hindi as Yeh To Kamaal Ho Gaya (1982), with Haasan reprising his role.

== Plot ==
The film revolves around twin brothers who were separated in childhood and raised by different families. One grows up to be educated and virtuous, while the other becomes an uneducated petty thief and local troublemaker. Complications arise when their girlfriends mistake one brother for the other due to their identical appearance. The story concludes with the reunion of the twin brothers.

== Cast ==
- Kamal Haasan as Babu / Rathnam
- Sripriya as Priya
- Miss. Elizabeth as Kathrine
- Srikanth as Senthil
- S. A. Ashokan as Mayandi
- Thengai Srinivasan as Lawyer Nagarajan
- Suruli Rajan as Rathnam's Friend
- V. Gopalakrishnan as Priya's Father
- Pushpalatha as Lakshmi
- Gandhimathi as Sivakolunthu
- Sathyaraj as Vicky
- Loose Mohan
- Usilai Mani

== Production ==
Sattam En Kaiyil is the debut film of Sathyaraj. It was the cinematographer N. K. Viswanathan who recommended him to the director T. N. Balu. Sathyaraj received a salary of ₹500. Kamal Haasan learned Madras Tamil for the film from Loose Mohan.

== Soundtrack ==
All songs were composed by Ilaiyaraaja. The song "Sorgam Madhuvile" was remixed by Karthik Raja for Maamadurai (2007).

Title	Singer(s)	Lyrics	Length
"Aazhakadalil"	Malaysia Vasudevan, S. Janaki	Kannadasan	4:08
"Sorgam Madhuvile"	S. P. Balasubrahmanyam	Kannadasan	4:34
"Ore Idam"	P. Susheela	Kannadasan	4:40
"Kadai Thengaiyo"	Malaysia Vasudevan	Thirupathooran	4:35
"Mera Naam Abdullah"	S. P. Balasubrahmanyam	Kannadasan	4:10

== Release ==
Sattam En Kaiyil was released on 14 July 1978, by Sri Shal Movies. It was commercially successful and ran for 100 days. 100th days celebration of the film was attended by M. Karunanidhi.
