= Alli Darbar =

1978 film

- Theatrical release poster
- Directed by: K. M. Balakrishnan
- Produced by: K. N. Subbaiah
- Starring: Vijayakumar; Manjula
- Music by: Shyam
- Production company: S.P.V. Films
- Release date: 1 September 1978
- Running time: 141 minutes
- Country: India
- Language: Tamil

Alli Darbar (transl. The Court of Alli) (Note: "Alli Darbar" is also a colloquial expression used by Tamil people to refer to a house where the wife's hand is the upper one.) is a 1978 Indian Tamil-language film directed by K. M. Balakrishnan, and produced by Aiyaa Creations. The film stars Vijayakumar and Manjula. It was released on 1 September 1978.

== Plot ==
Vijay, a youth, goes searching for a gang of women criminals, to stop their terrorising the people and to earn the police-sponsored ₹1 lakh (equivalent to ₹27 lakh or US$29,000 in 2023). Vijay and his two friends, with help of some pet animals, thwart some of the robbery attempts. Alli, one of the chief gangsters, decides to capture Vijay but falls in love with him and Malliga from the same gang comes to know the truth of Vijay as her long lost elder brother.

== Cast ==
- Vijayakumar as Vijay
- Manjula as Alli
- Kavitha as Malliga
- Bhavani as Lily
- Abarna
- Jayamalini
- M. N. Nambiar

== Soundtrack ==
The music was composed by Shyam.

Track listing
No.	Title	Lyrics	Singer(s)	Length
1.	"Puratchi Thalaivarai"	Pulavar Chidambaranathan	T. M. Soundararajan
2.	"Naan Paadancholli Koduppein"	Vaali	Vani Jairam, chorus
3.	"Naan Paadancholli Koduppein"	Vaali	T. M. Soundararajan
4.	"Singari Sirikkum"	Vaali	S. Janaki, chorus
