= Sriranjani Jr. =

Indian actress (1927–1974)

- Born: 22 February 1927; Murikipudi, Guntur district, Andhra Pradesh, India
- Died: 27 April 1974 (aged 47)
- Occupation: Actress
- Years active: 1944–1974
- Notable work: Gunasundari Katha (1949), Parasakthi (1952)

Sriranjani (22 February 1927 – 27 April 1974) was an Indian actress active in Telugu and Tamil films. She was the younger sister of Sriranjani. She is known mainly for her tragedy roles particularly her frequent portrayal of the long-suffering wife.

== Life ==
Sriranjani was born in Murikipudi village of Guntur district, Andhra Pradesh. Her elder sister Mangalagiri Sriranjani, known as Sriranjani Senior, was also an actress and portrayed Sita for the first time on the Telugu screen. Her birth name was Mahalakshmi. She had grown up with her elder sister and developed interest in movies and acting. Chitrapu Narayana Murthy encouraged her and gave her chance to act in the film Bhishma in 1944. She subsequently acted in Gollabhama, Brahmachari, Gitanjali, Madalasa, Laila Majnu etc., Her life turned brighter as a heroine character in Gunasundari Katha in 1949, directed by famous K. V. Reddy. In this film her Gunasundari character established her in the industry. She acted as heroine in the magnum opus Chandraharam. Though she acted in many films like Mantradandam, Sankranthi, Prema, Bratuku Teruvu, Svayamprabha, Ramanjaneya Yuddham her best portrayal was the all-time hit of Gunasundari Katha.

In her Tamil film Parasakthi (1952), Sriranjani portrayed the male ideal of virtuous Hindu womanhood. In the same year, she also starred with MGR in the movie Kumari. Another serious role of Sriranjani was as Chandra (the wife of the hero, a lothario who suffers from leprosy) in Ratha Kanneer, a 1954 Tamil movie. Sriranjani played Rajee in the Tamil film Rajee En Kanmani (1954). The film is based on the City Lights (1931) of Charlie Chaplin.

She retired from films in 1960, but returned for a few guest roles. She died in 1974.

== Partial filmography ==
Year	Title	Role	Language	Notes
1944	Bhishma		Telugu	
1946	Gruhapravesam		Telugu	
1947	Brahma Ratham		Telugu	
1947	Gollabhama		Telugu	
1948	Madalasa		Telugu	
1948	Gitanjali		Telugu	
1949	Gunasundari Katha		Telugu	
1949	Laila Majnu		Telugu	
1950	Vali Sugriva		Telugu	
1951	Mantra Dandam		Telugu	
1952	Sankranti		Telugu	
1952	Rajeswari		Telugu	
1952	Prema		Telugu	
1952	Manavati		Telugu	
1952	Parasakthi		Tamil	
1952	Kumari		Tamil	
1952	Kaadhal		Tamil	
1952	Manavathi		Tamil	
1953	Bratuku Teruvu		Telugu	
1954	Peddamanushulu		Telugu	
1954	Amarasandesam		Telugu	
1954	Chandraharam		Telugu	
1954	Chandraharam		Tamil	
1954	Illara Jothi		Tamil	
1954	Rajee En Kanmani		Tamil	
1954	Ratha Kanneer		Tamil	
1955	Sri Krishna Tulabharam		Telugu	
1955	Santhanam		Telugu	
1956	Uma Sundari		Telugu	
1956	Penki Pellam		Telugu	
1956	Naane Raja		Tamil	
1957	Preme Daivam		Telugu	
1957	Vaddante Pelli	Gowri	Telugu	
1957	Anbe Deivam		Tamil	
1957	Premada Putri		Kannada	
1959	Krishna Leelalu	Devaki	Telugu	
1959	Penn Kulathin Pon Vilakku		Tamil	
1959	Orey Vazhi		Tamil	
1960	Mahakavi Kalidasu		Telugu	
1960	Thilakam		Tamil	
1962	Vikramaadhithan		Tamil	
1963	Sri Krishnarjuna Yudham		Telugu	
1963	Idhu Sathiyam		Tamil	
1965	Bangaru Panjaram		Telugu	
1967	Naan		Tamil	
1968	Nenante Nene		Telugu	
1968	Aggi Meeda Guggilam		Telugu	
1968	Moondrezhuthu		Tamil	
1969	Bhale Tammudu		Telugu	
1969	Ukku Pidugu	Maharani Shanthimathi Devi of Kalinga	Telugu	
1969	Raja Simha	Ratanavali	Telugu	
1969	Kaaval Dheivam		Tamil	
1971	Jeevitha Chakram		Telugu	
1972	Sampoorna Ramayanam	Sumitra	Telugu	
1972	Vazhai Yadi Vazha		Tamil	
1973	Bhakta Tukaram		Telugu	
1973	Jeevana Tarangalu		Telugu	
1973	Ponnunjal		Tamil	
1974	Galipatalu		Telugu	
1974	Inti Kodalu		Telugu	
