= Balaraju Katha =

1970 film directed by Bapu

- Directed by: Bapu
- Story by: A. P. Nagarajan (story)
- Produced by: Vasiraju Prakasam; Nidamarthi Padmakshi
- Starring: Master Prabhakar; Nagabhushanam; Allu Ramalingaiah; Hemalatha; Dhulipala; Suryakantham
- Cinematography: P. S. Selvaraj
- Edited by: Kotagiri Gopal Rao
- Music by: K. V. Mahadevan
- Release date: August 25, 1970
- Country: India
- Language: Telugu

Balaraju Katha (transl. The Story of Balaraju) is a 1970 Indian Telugu-language drama film written by Mullapudi Venkata Ramana and directed by Bapu. It is a remake of the 1969 Tamil film Vaa Raja Vaa, and has won the Nandi Award for Best Feature Film (bronze).

== Plot ==
Balaraju (Master Prabhakar) is a young boy in Mahabalipuram, a historical town. He becomes a tourist guide to support his family. An elderly childless couple takes a liking to him and wants to adopt him. The story recounts his ordeals.

== Cast ==
- Master Prabhakar as Balaraju
- Nagabhushanam
- Suryakantham
- Dhulipala
- Mikkilineni
- Allu Ramalingaiah
- Baby Sumathi
- Sakshi Ranga Rao
- Hemalatha
- Raavi Kondala Rao
- Pushpa Kumari
- Master Visweswara Rao

== Soundtrack ==
Soundtrack was composed by K. V. Mahadevan.

- "Adiganani Anukovaddu Cheppakunda Dateyoddu" -
- "Cheppu Cheppu Bhai Jarigedi Vippi Cheppu" -
- "Choodu Choodu Tamasha Bhale Tamasha Aidu Vella Tamasha" -
- "Hippie Hippie Aadapillalo Veellu Chepparani Goppa Goppa Tarajuvvalo" -
- "Mahabalipuram...Bharateeya Kalajagatikidi Goppa Gopuram" -
- "Okati Rendu Moodaite Muddu Antaku Minchina Santanamaite Vaddu" -

== Awards ==
The film won Nandi Award for Third Best Feature Film – Bronze – 1970
