= T. K. Ramamoorthy =

Indian Tamil musician

T. K. Ramamoorthy டி. கே. ராமமூர்த்தி
- T. K. Ramamoorthy

Background information
- Born: Trichirappalli Krishnasamy Ramamoorthy; 15 May 1922; Tiruchirapalli, Madras Presidency, British India
- Died: 17 April 2013 (aged 90) Chennai, Tamil Nadu, India
- Occupation: composer
- Instrument: keyboard/harmonium/violin
- Spouse: Dharmambal

Trichirappalli Krishnasamy Ramamoorthy (18 May 1922 – 17 April 2013) was an Indian Tamil music composer.

Ramamoorthy was known as Mellisai Mannar (Tamil: மெல்லிசை மன்னர்; "The King of Light Music"), along with M. S. Viswanathan. His major works are in Tamil, Malayalam and Telugu films. He and M. S. Viswanathan, as the duo Viswanathan–Ramamoorthy, composed musical scores for over 100 films in the South Indian film industry during the 1950s and 1960s. The duo parted amicably in 1965, but eventually rejoined in 1995 after 30 years for Engirundho Vandhan.

At age 91, he died in a hospital in Chennai on 17 April 2013.

== Early life ==
Tiruchirapalli Krishnaswamy Ramamoorthy was born in Tiruchirapalli into a family that was musically inclined. Both his parents, Krishnasamy Pillai and Nagalakshmi, and grandfather, Malaikkottai Govindaswamy Pillai, were well-known violinists in Tiruchirapalli. Ramamoorthy gave several stage performances along with his father in his childhood. When he was fourteen, C. R. Subbaraman noted the young boy's talent and hired him as a violinist for His Master's Voice.

== Career ==
In the 1940s, Ramamoorthy worked in Saraswathi stores where AVM Studio's boss, Avichi Meiyappa Chettiar, was a partner in the shop. This led him to play violin for AVM's music composer, R. Sudarsanam, in some films. During these days, he also became friends with P.S. Diwakar, a pianist and music composer in the Malayala films. By the late 1940s, C. R. Subbaraman, who was a rising star in the South Indian film music world, used Ramamoorthy as one of the violinists in his musical troupe. There, he met violinist and composer T. G. Lingappa, as well as M. S. Viswanathan in 1950, with whom he became a partner in later years.

== Viswanathan–Ramamoorthy partnership ==
In 1952, C. R. Subburaman died unexpectedly, which led to Ramamoorthy and Viswanathan joining to complete the background music for the films Subburaman was working on. They were introduced by N. S. Krishnan, who knew them both fairly intimately and also their respective talents by then.

T. K. Ramamoorthy, despite being an excellent musician with an orthodox Carnatic musical background, was a shy, modest and reserved person whereas M. S. Viswanathan was naturally talented, charming, forward and dynamic even if he lacked the similar background in Carnatic music. Ramamoorthy was older than Viswanathan by six years, but the placing of their names in Viswanathan–Ramamoorthy team was agreed upon by both parties on the advice of Krishnan, who thereafter got the duo their first chance to score Krishnan's 1953 film, Panam.

The duo composed for over 100 films during the '50s and '60s, revitalising Chennai film music. The duo parted in 1965 and since then, they had composed for films individually. Although M.S. Viswanathan enjoyed a successful solo career, with over 700 films from 1965 to 2013, Ramamoorthy composed for only 19 films from 1966 to 1986.

He was awarded an honorary doctorate, along with M.S. Viswanathan, by the Sathyabama Deemed University in September 2006.

In addition, J. Jayalalithaa being the Chief Minister of Tamil Nadu, conferred the Thirai Isai Chakravarthy (Tamil: திரை இசை சக்ரவர்த்தி; "Emperors of the Cine Music") title in August 2012 and presented it to him, along with 60 gold coins and a new car.

== Death ==
Ramamoorthy died in a hospital in Chennai following a brief illness on 17 April 2013. He was 90.

== Filmography ==
T.K.Ramamoorthy, in association with M.S.Viswanathan, composed music for over 100 films, starting with "Panam" in 1952 up till "Aayirathil Oruvan" in 1966, under the brand name 'Viswanathan–Ramamoorthy'. After their separation in 1966, T.K Ramamoorthy composed music for these films –

Year	Film	Director	Studio
1966	Sadhu Mirandal	Thirumalai–Mahalingam	Sunbeam Productions
1966	Marakka Mudiyuma?	Murasoli Maran	Mekala Pictures
1966	Thenmazhai	Muktha Srinivasan	Muktha Films
1966	Madras to Pondicherry	Thirumalai–Mahalingam	Sunbeam Productions
1967	Pattathu Rani	S. Ramanathan	Sunbeam Productions
1967	Engalukkum Kalam Varum	A. Vincent	Pauls & Company
1967	Aalayam	Thirumalai-Mahalingam	Sunbeam Productions
1967	Naan	T. R. Ramanna	Vinayaka Pictures
1968	Soappu Seeppu Kannadi	Thirumalai–Mahalingam	Karthekeya Films
1968	Neelagiri Express	Thirumalai–Mahalingam	ALS Productions
1968	Moondrezhuthu	T. R. Ramanna	Vinayaka Pictures
1969	Thanga Surangam	T. R. Ramanna	EVR Pictures
1970	Kadhal Jothi	Thirumalai–Mahalingam	Mani Malar Films
1970	Sangamam	Dada Mirasi	Chaira Films
1972	Shakthi Leelai	T. R. Ramanna	Raman Pictures
1973	Praarthanai	Kaushikan	Chitra Lok
1975	Avalukku Ayiram Kangai	T. R. Ramanna	AB Creation
1984	Antha 16 June	A.Shanmugam	Bama Creations
1986	Ival Oru Pournami		
