= Bairavi =

1978 film by M. Bhaskar

- Poster
- Directed by: M. Bhaskar
- Screenplay by: Madurai Thirumaran
- Story by: Kalaignanam
- Produced by: Kalaignanam
- Starring: Srikanth; Rajinikanth; Sripriya
- Cinematography: K. S. Bhaskar Rao
- Edited by: M. Vellaisamy
- Music by: Ilaiyaraaja
- Production company: Vallivelan Movies
- Distributed by: Subramania Films
- Release date: 8 June 1978
- Running time: 124 minutes
- Country: India
- Language: Tamil

Bairavi is a 1978 Indian Tamil-language film directed by M. Bhaskar, and produced by Kalaignanam, who also wrote the story and dialogues. It stars Srikanth, Rajinikanth and Sripriya. Geetha was introduced in this film and plays the title character. Srikanth played the antagonist. Sudheer, Manorama and Suruli Rajan played other major roles. The film was released on 8 June 1978.

== Plot ==
Mookaiyah and his sister Bairavi are the children of a drunkard. They are separated after Bhairavi is lost in an accident. Following this, Mookaiyah becomes a servant of a local landlord Rajalingam. Mookaiyah is a loyal servant and does whatever is asked of him. Rajalingam forces Mookaiyah to abduct a young girl from a neighbouring village, Bhagyam. Rajalingam rapes her in the Mookaiyah's absence. Maanikam, Bhagyam's adopted brother, learns of the incident. When the police investigate Maanikam, Mookaiyah discovers that Bhagyam is Bairavi. Then he immediately approaches Rajalingam and forces him to marry Bairavi; he was not ready to accept it at first but after a while he promises to Mookaiyah that he will marry Bairavi.

As Mookaiyah was the person who abducted Bairavi, the police suspect that he is the culprit, goes to Rajalingam's house to learn about Mookaiyah. Rajalingam also alleges to the police that Mookaiyah only raped Bairavi. The police therefore arrest Mookaiyah, based on Rajalingam's testimony. Meanwhile, Rajalingam plans to kill Bairavi, who is in an unconscious state in hospital. If Bairavi becomes conscious and testifies to the police then he will be punished, so he kills her. After learning of his adopted sister's murder, Maanikam vows vengeance on Mookaiyah, whom he believes to be responsible for Bairavi's death. Meanwhile, Mookaiyah escapes from jail knowing about the incident. He then sets out to kill Rajalingam to avenge his sister's death.

== Cast ==
- Srikanth as Rajalingam
- Rajinikanth as Mookkaiya
- V. K. Ramasamy as Meenakshi's father
- Suruli Rajan as Pannai
- Sudheer as Manickam
- Sripriya as Pavunu
- Manorama as Meenakshi
- Y. Vijaya as Leela
- Geetha as Bhairavi
- T. K. Ramachandran as the father of Mookkaiya and Bhairavi
- K. Natraj as Sandiyar

== Production ==
Kalaignanam, who was impressed with Rajinikanth's acting style, went straight ahead casting him in the lead role for Bhairavi, and paid him an advance. Initially, Sandow M. M. A. Chinnappa Thevar agreed to give financial support for Bhairavi but when he heard Rajinikanth is the lead actor, he withdrew the support and advised Kalaignanam to stop the film or change the actor and questioned him for choosing a villain in the lead role and hero as villain (Srikanth was acting as hero those days) and he assured that it will be a huge loss. Kalaignanam approached Muthuraman to play negative role but he refused to portray a negative character, Srikanth was finally selected for the role. M. Bhaskar made his directorial debut with this film.

== Music ==
The soundtrack was composed by Ilaiyaraaja. All the lyrics were written by Kannadasan except "Kattapulle" written by Chidambaranathan.

Track listing
No.	Title	Singer(s)	Length
1.	"Kattapulle"	T. M. Soundararajan, S. Janaki	4:11
2.	"Nandooruthu"	T. M. Soundararajan	4:41
3.	"Oru Padhiyil"	S. Janaki	3:56
4.	"Yezhukadal Nayakiye"	S. Janaki	4:33
Total length:			17:35

== Release ==
Bairavi was released on 8 June 1978, and distributed by Subramania Films. A 35-foot high cutout of Rajinikanth was built at Plaza Theatre by S. Thanu to promote the film. In the posters, Rajinikanth was referred to as "Superstar", although he was initially against it.

== Bibliography ==
- Ramachandran, Naman (2014) [2012]. Rajinikanth: The Definitive Biography. New Delhi: Penguin Books. ISBN 978-0-14-342111-5.
