= Naane Raja (1956 film) =

1956 film by R. R. Chandiran

- Theatrical release poster
- Directed by: E. Appa Rao; P. V. Narayanan
- Written by: Kannadasan
- Produced by: R. R. Chandran
- Starring: Sivaji Ganesan; Sriranjani
- Cinematography: R. R. Chandran
- Edited by: P. V. Narayanan
- Music by: T. R. Ramnath
- Production company: Sri Kalpana Pictures
- Distributed by: Veeyar Movies
- Release date: 25 January 1956
- Country: India
- Language: Tamil

Naane Raja (transl. I am the king) is a 1956 Indian Tamil-language film, directed by R. R. Chandiran. The film stars Sivaji Ganesan and Sriranjani. It was released on 25 January 1956.

== Cast ==
Male cast

- Sivaji Ganesan as Villalan
- T. S. Balaiah
- S. V. Subbaiah
- S. V. Sahasranamam
- M. K. Mustafa
- V. Gopalakrishnan as Thanajayan
- N. S. Subbaiah
- Chandrababu (Guest Artist)
- E. R. Sahadevan (Guest Artist)

Female cast

- Sriranjani as Thenmozhi
- M. N. Rajam as Mangani
- Girija
- T. P. Muthulakshmi
- Angamuthu
- Mohana

Dance

- Kumari Kamala
- Ambika

== Soundtrack ==
The music was composed by T. R. Ramnath.

Song	Singers	Lyrics	Length
"Mandha Maarudham Thavazhum"	T. M. Soundararajan	K. P. Kamatchisundaram	03:43
"Aadar Kalaikkazhagu Sera Pirandhaval"	P. Leela & N. L. Ganasaraswathi	Bharathidasan	04:28
"Maalai Sooduven Magizhvaai Aaduven"	Jikki	Lakshumanadas	01:57
"Aadhi Andham Illa Arul Jothiye"	T. M. Soundararajan	K. P. Kamatchisundaram	03:30
"Sindhu Paadum Thendral Vandhu"	V. N. Sundharam & P. Leela	Kuyilan	02:16
"Aanum Pennum Vaazhvinil Inbam"	T. V. Rathnam	K. P. Kamatchisundaram	02:54
"Vel Muruga...Aaanai Mugan Thambi"	T. M. Soundararajan & S. C. Krishnan	Thanjai Ramaiah Dass	02:40
"Pesuvadhaal Inbam Peruvaar Undo"	T. V. Rathnam	K. P. Kamatchisundaram	03:18
"Malai Mudi Thediye...Andhi Vanam Meedhile"	P. Leela	Kuyilan	03:30
"O Amma Josiyam...Elelangadi"	A. G. Rathnamala	Thanjai Ramaiah Dass	03:53
"Pon Meni Kaatti Unai"	Jikki	Bharathidasan	
"Thunbam Yaavum Vaazhvile"	P. Leela	Kuyilan	03:00
