= Kalaignanam =

Cine artist

- Born: K. M. Balakrishnan; 15 July 1929 (age 97); Elumalai, Tamil Nadu, India
- Occupations: writer, actor, producer, director
- Spouse: Pushpavalli
- Children: 6
- Awards: Kalaimamani (2017)

Kalaignanam (born K. M. Balakrishnan), is an Indian writer, actor, producer and director who works in Tamil films.

== Early life ==
Kalaignanam was born in Elumalai Village.

== Cinema career ==
Rajinikanth essayed first independent lead role in the movie Bairavi produced by Kalaignanam. Bairavai movie was produced under the production company name Valli Velan movies. After the success of the movie later Kalaignanam produced his movies under the production company name Bhairavi productions.

== Partial filmography ==
As director
Film	Year
Aaru Pushpangal	1977
Alli Darbar	1978
Nellikani	1981
Neethikku Oru Penn	1984

As actor
Film	Year
Idhu Namma Aalu	1988
Kathai Thiraikathai Vasanam Iyakkam	2014
Naachiyaar	2018

As story writer
Film	Year
Kathal Paduthum Padu	1966
Veguli Penn	1971
Kurathi Magan	1972
Anbai Thedi	1974
Thangathile Vairam	1975
Kanavan Manaivi	1976
Bairavi	1978
Ilanjodigal	1982
Miruthanga Chakravarthi	1983
Amman Kovil Thiruvizha	1990
Pudhupatti Ponnuthaayi	

As Producer
Film	Year
Bairavi	1978
Jyothi malar	1986
Raja Rishi	1985

== Books ==
He has written his cinema experiences as four volume of books named Cinema secret.

== Personal life ==
Kalaignanam's elder son Murugan died in September 2017.
