= Uyarnthavargal =

- Title card
- Directed by: T. N. Balu
- Screenplay by: T. N. Balu
- Story by: Gulzar
- Produced by: H. R. Mehra
- Starring: Kamal Haasan; Sujatha
- Cinematography: N. K. Viswanathan
- Edited by: R. Bhaskaran
- Music by: Shankar–Ganesh
- Production company: Raasleela Pictures
- Release date: 14 January 1977
- Country: India
- Language: Tamil

Uyarnthavargal (transl. Exalted people) is a 1977 Indian Tamil-language film directed by T. N. Balu, starring Kamal Haasan and Sujatha. The film deals with a deaf-mute couple and their struggle in society. It is a remake of the 1972 Hindi film Koshish, which itself was inspired by the 1961 Japanese film Happiness of Us Alone.

== Plot ==
Aarumugam and Aarthi are deaf-mute. They meet and fall in love and later get married. They get blessed with a child, but the child accidentally dies due to a petty thief which devastates the couple. Aarumugam and Aarthi's life comes back to normal after their second child is born. They take all care in bringing him up to be well educated. Ironically, their employer's daughter is also deaf-mute. They want to get their son married to the employer's daughter, but the son opposes the matrimonial alliance.

== Cast ==
- Kamal Haasan as Aarumugam
- Sujatha as Aarthi
- Thengai Srinivasan
- Srikanth as the thief
- Pandari Bai
- Master Sridhar
- Typist Gopu
- Loose Mohan

Guest actors

- Sanjeev Kumar
- Prem Nazir
- N.T. Rama Rao
- Rajkumar
- Jaishankar as Sankar
- Manorama
- M. Balamuralikrishna
- Suruli Rajan
- S. A. Ashokan

== Production ==
Uyarnthavargal was produced under production banner Raasleela Pictures. The film was launched at AVM Recording Studios. The final length of the film was 3,982.51 metres (13,066.0 ft).

== Soundtrack ==
The music was composed by Shankar–Ganesh and lyrics were written by Kannadasan.

Song	Singers
"Iraivan Irandu Bommaigal"	K. J. Yesudas, Vani Jairam
"Raman neeye"	M. Balamuralikrishna
"Uyarthavargal"	S. P. Balasubrahmanyam

== Release and reception ==
Uyarnthavargal was released on 14 January 1977. Kanthan of Kalki appreciated the film for not having fight sequences or duet songs picturised on the lead characters, considering their deaf-muteness. Free India also gave the film a positive review for Balu's direction and writing, and the performances of Haasan, Sujatha and Srikanth.
