= Moondrezhuthu =

- Theatrical release poster
- Directed by: T. R. Ramanna
- Written by: T. N. Balu
- Produced by: T. K. Ramarajan
- Starring: Ravichandran; Jayalalithaa; Srividya; Sheela
- Cinematography: M. A. Rahman
- Edited by: M. S. Mani
- Music by: T. K. Ramamoorthy
- Production company: Sri Vinayaga Pictures
- Release date: 10 May 1968
- Running time: 176 minutes
- Country: India
- Language: Tamil

Moondrezhuthu (transl. Three letters) is a 1968 Indian Tamil-language crime film, directed by T. R. Ramanna, produced by T. K. Ramarajan and written by T. N. Balu. Music was by T. K. Ramamoorthy. The film stars Ravichandran, Jayalalithaa, Srividya and Sheela. It was released on 10 May 1968.

== Plot ==
The film revolves around a chest filled with valuable items and a handful of people competing for it. One character is a greedy old man Rajarathnam Pillai, whose daughter is Selvi. A manager Meganathan is trusted with the chest which needs to be handed over to its legitimate claimants (Pankajam and her suffering family). In his efforts to deliver the chest to its rightful owners, he is forced to commit murder and is sent to jail. His son Maran, to whom he narrates the events, buries the treasure in a village and splits the clues to its whereabouts across three pieces of paper, each marked with a single Tamil letter: தி (Thi) மு (Mu) and க (Ka).

After many twists and turns, the three villains decipher that the Tamil letters are a clue to the name of the village where the box is buried and they end up going there. Now, the land is in the possession of a factory coming up in its place, and another villain Karmegam also goes after the treasure by killing the others with heavy equipment. How the hero assisted by Nagesh deals with this forms the rest of the story. At the end, the villains are exposed and the box is handed over to its rightful owners. The lovers, Selvi and Maran, are united too.

== Cast ==
- Ravichandran as Maran
- Jayalalithaa as Selvi
- Srividya as Malathi
- Sheela as Suguna/Meera
- Major Sundarrajan as Meganathan
- Sedhupathy as Ramapathran
- Sriranjani as Pankajam
- Ennathe Kannaiah as Sukadiya Sett
- C. L. Anandan as Muthu
- R. S. Manohar as Tiger
- S. A. Ashokan as Rajarathnam Pillai
- Gandhimathi as Selvi's mother
- O. A. K. Thevar as Somasundaram
- Nagesh as Appu
- Thengai Srinivasan as Kumar/Sankaran Kutty
- Suruli Rajan as Venkateswara Rao
- Master Prabhakar as Ramapathran's son
- Vasanthi
- Kalavathi

== Soundtrack ==
Music was composed by T. K. Ramamoorthy and lyrics were written by Kannadasan.

Song	Singer	Length
"Aadu Paarkalam Aadu"	T. M. Soundararajan	03:22
"Pettiyilae Pottadaittha"	T. M. Soundararajan & P. Susheela	03:34
"Iravil Vandha"	T. M. Soundararajan & S. V. Ponnusamy	03:16
"Aayalottum.... Konjum Kili"	T. M. Soundararajan & L. R. Eswari	04:52
"Sandai Nadapadhu.... Pachai Kili"	L. R. Eswari	03:27
"Kaadhalan Vandhan"	P. Susheela & S. V. Ponnusamy	03:38
"Dheivatthin Kovil"	L. R. Eswari	03:08

== Reception ==
Kalki criticised the film for its outdated storyline and lack of originality. Despite this, it became a success.
