= Naan (1967 film) =

1967 film by T. R. Ramanna

- Theatrical release poster
- Directed by: T. R. Ramanna
- Written by: T. N. Balu
- Produced by: T. K. Ramarajan
- Starring: Ravichandran; Jayalalithaa; Muthuraman; Nagesh
- Cinematography: M. A. Rahman
- Edited by: M. S. Mani
- Music by: T. K. Ramamoorthy
- Production company: Sri Vinayaka Pictures
- Release date: 1 November 1967
- Running time: 203 minutes
- Country: India
- Language: Tamil

Naan (transl. Me) is 1967 Indian Tamil-language film, directed by T. R. Ramanna and written by T. N. Balu. The film stars Ravichandran, Jayalalithaa, Muthuraman and Nagesh. It focuses on a raja's failed attempt to find his lost son, and three men who claim to be the lost son, seeking rights to the raja's properties.

Naan was released on 1 November 1967, and ran for over 175 days in theatres. It was remade in Telugu as Nenante Nene (1968) and in Hindi as Waris (1969).

== Plot ==
A raja's son gets lost at a young age while trying to escape his father's enemy. The raja searches for his son for a few years until the agony of his absence leads to his death. Years later, three people visit the palace claiming to be the prince and seek rights to all properties. All three have the identities of the lost son and answer all questions related to the family history. The palace management are left with no choice but to accommodate all three unless they find the true heir.

The story takes a complete turn when it is revealed that none of them is the true heir, and the whereabouts of the real prince are unknown. The only way to reach the real prince is via these three people who know his whereabouts.

== Cast ==
- Ravichandran as Sekar/Chinnaraja
- Jayalalithaa as Geetha
- Muthuraman as Kumar / Chinna Raja
- Vijayasri as Parimalam
- Sriranjani as Kamakshi
- Manohar as Singaram
- Ashokan as Lal
- Nagesh as Sundaram
- Manorama as Mohini
- Suruli Rajan as Sundaralingam
- Ennathe Kannaiah as Uthandaraman
- Samikannu as Velu/Vels
- Muthulakshmi as Rajamma
- Baby Padmini as Ammu/Baby
- B. V. Radha as Sheela
- Madhavi as Bora

== Production ==
Naan was colourised using Eastmancolor. While portraying his character, Nagesh wore new glasses without removing the price label tag; although Ramanna wanted it removed, Nagesh decided to keep the tag for comic effect.

== Soundtrack ==
Music was composed by T. K. Ramamoorthy. The song "Vaandhal Ennodu Ingey" is based on the title track from the American film, Come September (1961).

Songs	Singers	Lyrics	Length
"Raaja Kannu Pogathadi"	T. M. Soundararajan	Vaali	4:28
"Adhey Mugam Adhey Kunam"	T. M. Soundararajan, P. Susheela	Vaali	3:32
"Naan Aanai Ittal"	T. M. Soundararajan, L. R. Eswari	(Mixed Songs)	3:05
"Pothumo Intha Idam"	T. M. Soundararajan, P. Susheela	Kannadasan	3:12
"Ammano Saamiyo"	Sirkazhi Govindarajan, L. R. Eswari	Kannadasan	5:35
"Vanthaal Ennodu Engeya"	L. R. Eswari	Kannadasan	4:26
"Murder in a Birthday Party"	Instrumental	Music Group Dance	6:08

== Release and reception ==
Naan was released on 1 November 1967, Diwali day and ran for 175 days in theatres. Kalki appreciated the film for Ramanna's direction and the innovative story.
