= Nenante Nene =

1968 film by V. Ramachandra Rao

- Poster
- Directed by: V. Ramachandra Rao
- Screenplay by: V. Ramachandra Rao
- Based on: Naan (Tamil) by T. R. Ramanna
- Produced by: P. N. Babji
- Starring: Krishna; Kanchana; Krishnam Raju; Nagabhushanam
- Cinematography: S. Venkat Ratnam
- Edited by: N. S. Prakasam
- Music by: S. P. Kodandapani
- Production company: Sujatha Films
- Release date: 6 September 1968
- Running time: 169 minutes
- Country: India
- Language: Telugu

Nenante Nene (transl. I means I) is a 1968 Indian Telugu-language film directed by V. Ramachandra Rao and produced by P. N. Babji. A remake of the 1967 Tamil film Naan, it stars Krishna, Kanchana, Krishnam Raju and Nagabhushanam. The film focuses on a Raja's failed attempt to find his lost son, and three men who claim to be the lost son, seeking rights to the Raja's properties. Nenante Nene was released on 6 September 1968 and became commercially successful.

== Plot ==
Rajkumar is the son of the Raja of Rangapuram. Annoyed by his father's feudalistic attitude, he flees to Rangoon where he is raised by a woman named Kamakshi. Years later, before dying, the Raja gives the job of finding his lost son to his three friends and his diwan, along with clues for identifying him. Three men – Anand, Ravi and Bhushanam – arrive at the Raja's palace and claim to be Rajkumar, seeking rights to the Raja's properties.

Kamakshi is brought in to identify the real Rajkumar. Under duress, she testifies to her own son Anand as Rajkumar. Meanwhile, Ravi falls in love with Geetha, the diwan's daughter. It is later revealed that Bhushanam is a CID officer trying to capture an underworld don who Anand works for. Ravi enacts a drama to save the real Rajkumar, who is in love with Ravi's sister Sarala. The film ends with Rajkumar being rescued and the culprits captured.

== Cast ==
Adapted from The Hindu:

- Krishna as Ravi
- Kanchana as Geetha
- Krishnam Raju as Anand
- Nagabhushanam as Bhushanam
- Chandra Mohan as Rajkumar
- Raavi Kondala Rao as the Diwan
- Nellore Kantharao as the don
- K. V. Chalam as Bajalu
- Suryakantham as Sukumari
- Sriranjani Jr. as Kamakshi
- Radha Kumari as Mohini
- Sandhyarani as Sarala
- Master Babu as young Rajkumar
- Baby Shanthikala as Baby

== Production ==
Nenante Nene, a remake of the 1967 Tamil film Naan, was directed by V. Ramachandra Rao and produced by P. N. Babji under Sujatha Films. The dialogues were written by Bhamidipati Radhakrishna, who largely followed the original Tamil dialogues written by T. N. Balu while making some improvisations. Ramachandra Rao also wrote the film's screenplay, largely following the original Tamil version but making some changes, such as basing the character Kamakshi in Rangoon, unlike the original version where she was based in Colombo. Sriranjani Jr. reprised this role from Naan.

Krishnam Raju was initially reluctant to play the negative role of Anand, having debuted in a heroic role in Chilaka Gorinka (1966), until Babji's brother Doondy advised him to accept the role as he needed to portray diverse characters to build a career in cinema. After industry elders and Krishnam Raju's friends, including cast member Krishna shared this view, he accepted the role. Cinematography was handled by S. Venkat Ratnam, and the editing by N. S. Prakasam. The film was prominently shot at Vauhini Studios. It was N. Srinivas' first film as an independent dance choreographer; in previous films, he assisted Hiralal. The final length of the film was 4,636 metres (15,210 ft).

== Soundtrack ==
The soundtrack was composed by S. P. Kodandapani. Songs like "O Chinnadhana Nannu Vidichi", "Oke Oka Gulabipai Valina Thummedha" and "Narasinga Saminira" attained popularity.

Track listing
No.	Title	Lyrics	Singer(s)	Length
1.	"O Chinnadhana Nannu Vidichi"	Kosaraju	S. P. Balasubrahmanyam
2.	"Oke Oka Gulabipai Valina Thummedha"	Aarudhra	S. P. Balasubrahmanyam, P. Susheela
3.	"Narasinga Saminira"	Kodakandla Appalacharya	Kousalya, S. P. Balasubrahmanyam
4.	"Nene Unnanu Nee Kosam"	C. Narayana Reddy	S. Janaki
5.	"Chaladha Ee Chotu"	Daasarathi	S. P. Balasubrahmanyam, P. Susheela
6.	"Ambavo Shakthivo Ankala Devivo"	Kosaraju	L. R. Eswari, Madhavapeddi Satyam

== Release ==
Nenante Nene was released on 6 September 1968 and was commercially successful.

== See also ==
- Waris, the Hindi remake of Naan
