= Rusi Kanda Poonai =

- Poster
- Directed by: G. N. Rangarajan
- Written by: Panchu Arunachalam
- Starring: Saritha; Sudhakar; M. R. R. Vasu
- Cinematography: N. K. Viswanathan
- Edited by: Ramalingam
- Music by: Ilaiyaraaja
- Production company: Panchu Arts
- Release date: 25 December 1980
- Country: India
- Language: Tamil

Rusi Kanda Poonai (transl. The cat that went after the taste) is a 1980 Indian Tamil-language film directed by G. N. Rangarajan and written by Panchu Arunachalam. The film stars Saritha, Sudhakar and M. R. R. Vasu. It was released on 25 December 1980.

== Plot ==
Savithri and Ramesh love each other and Ramesh promises Savithri that he will marry her. But later, it is revealed that Ramesh had already been married and dejected. Savithri leaves the hostel run by Manorama and her Siddha expert husband Suruli Rajan, for her hometown. Ramesh's marital life was a disaster as they often had quarrels. Eager to meet Savithri, Ramesh comes to the hostel, but finds she already left. Savithri becomes pregnant and delivers a baby girl and meanwhile, Ramesh's wife, Y. Vijaya dies in an accident. Savithri was never informed about the delivery of her baby girl and her mother gives the child to the greedy couple M. R. R. Vasu and Gandhimathi and both always torture the girl, in addition to blackmailing Savithri's mother for money to hide the truth of Savithri's daughter's birth. Savithri gets married and has a happy life and is blessed with a daughter. Meanwhile, Ramesh is in search of Savithri and one day meets him at a beach as her daughter gets almost drowned, but gets saved by him. Savithri avoids speaking with Ramesh. Meanwhile, M. R. R. R. Vasu blackmails Savithri's mother for money and unable to handle the pressure, she dies revealing the truth to Savithri's daughter. What will happen to Ramesh, will Savithri's husband find out the truth and what happens to M. R. R. Vasu gets revealed in the climax.

== Cast ==
- Saritha as Savithri
- Sudhakar as Ramesh
- Vijay Babu
- M. R. R. Vasu
- Gandhimathi
- Y. Vijaya
- Manorama
- Suruli Rajan

== Soundtrack ==
The soundtrack was composed by Ilaiyaraaja. S. Janaki sang in a child's voice for the song "Kanna Nee Enge".

Track	Singers	Lyrics	Duration
"Anbu Mugham Thantha Sugham"	Ilaiyaraaja	Panchu Arunachalam	4:26
"En Nenjam"	S. Janaki	Panchu Arunachalam	1:56
"Kanna Nee Engey"	S. Janaki	S. Janaki	2:10
"Sandhanam Ittu"	P. Susheela	Gangai Amaran	1:37
"Sandhanamittuch Chadhiradum Mottu"	P. Susheela	Gangai Amaran	4:07

== Reception ==
Anna praised the acting of the star cast, Arunachalam's dialogues, Rangarajan's direction and Viswanathan's cinematography but panned Sudhakar's acting and Suruli Rajan's humour.
