= Yeh To Kamaal Ho Gaya =

- Promotional poster
- Directed by: T. Rama Rao
- Written by: Rahi Masoom Reza (dialogue)
- Screenplay by: Jayant Dharmadhikar
- Story by: T. N. Balu
- Based on: Sattam En Kaiyil (Tamil)
- Produced by: P. Mallikharjuna Rao
- Starring: Kamal Haasan; Poonam Dhillon
- Cinematography: M. Kannappa
- Edited by: Krishnaswamy; Balu
- Music by: R. D. Burman
- Production company: Bharati International
- Release date: 29 October 1982
- Country: India
- Language: Hindi

Yeh To Kamaal Ho Gaya (transl. This is just amazing) is a 1982 Indian Hindi-language film directed by T. Rama Rao. It has Kamal Haasan in a double role, with Poonam Dhillon in the lead roles and is a remake of his own acted Tamil film Sattam En Kaiyil (1978).

== Plot ==
Rasik Bihari Saxena a corrupt lawyer sends the child of thief Shankar Chander to juvenile-jail for committing murder. Shankar abducts one of Rasik's twin children from hospital after their birth. Shankar keeps this boy with him and names him Ratan, Shankar's wife Shanta nurtures Ratan. Shankar teaches Ratan how to steal money, good things etc. from people. On the other hand, Rasik's child is now an adult and his name is Ajay Saxena, he has studied abroad and married a foreign girl. Rasik doesn't like the foreigner girl, seeing this, angers Ajay and he leaves home. Ajay is arrested for being guilty of killing a girl named Ruby Gupta. Knowing this, Shankar tells Ratan to go to Rasik's home and to pretend to be Ajay, Ratan abides by his father. At the end of this film Rasik's wife Laxmi understands that both of the same looking boys (Ratan and Ajay) are actually her own sons.

== Cast ==
- Kamal Haasan as Ratan Chandar / Ajay Saxena (Double Role)
- Poonam Dhillon as Priya Singh
- Vijay Arora as Advocate Mahesh Chandar
- Ranjeet as Chandru Singh
- Om Shivpuri as Advocate Rasik Bihari Saxena
- Ashalata Wabgaonkar as Laxmi Saxena
- Satyen Kappu as Shankar Chandar
- Kumud Bole as Shanta Chandar
- Suresh Chatwal as Auditorium Manager
- Raj Mehra as Mohan Singh
- Dina Pathak as Durga Singh
- Shashikala as Guest Appearance
- Tun Tun as Guest Appearance

== Release ==
The film was released on 29 October 1982. It was a box office success and had a theatrical run of 175 days.

== Soundtrack ==
Yeh To Kamaal Ho Gaya

Soundtrack album by R. D. Burman
- Released: 1982
- Genre: Feature film soundtrack
- Language: Hindi
- Label: Echo
External audio
- Audio Jukebox on YouTube

The film's music was composed by R. D. Burman and lyrics were penned by Anand Bakshi. Veteran singer S. P. Balasubrahmanyam collaborated with R. D. Burman for the first time in this film. Though the film Mangalsutra was released before a year, where S. P. Balasubrahmanyam sang a song under the music of R. D. Burman.

Song	Singer
"Dekho Dekho"	S. P. Balasubrahmanyam
"Dugdugi Baj Uthi"	S. P. Balasubrahmanyam
"Naujawanon Mein"	S. P. Balasubrahmanyam
"Main Awara Banjara Raste Mein Kho Gaya"	S. P. Balasubrahmanyam, Asha Bhosle
"Yeh Duniya Ghum Rahi Hai"	S. P. Balasubrahmanyam, Asha Bhosle
"Hum Tum Hum Do Rahi"	S. P. Balasubrahmanyam, Ursula Vaz
