= Janaki Sabatham =

- Poster
- Directed by: Avinasi Mani
- Written by: S. Jagadeesan
- Produced by: Santha Rajagopal
- Starring: K. R. Vijaya; Ravichandran; Vijayakumar; Vennira Aadai Nirmala
- Cinematography: V. Selvaraj; P. Ganesapandian
- Edited by: Vijay Anand
- Music by: V. Kumar
- Production company: Sri Meenakshi Films
- Release date: 15 January 1976
- Country: India
- Language: Tamil

Janaki Sabatham (/dʒɑːnəkɪ səbəθəm/ transl. Janaki's vow) is a 1976 Indian Tamil-language film directed by Avinasi Mani and written by S. Jagadeesan. The film stars K. R. Vijaya, Ravichandran, Vijayakumar and Vennira Aadai Nirmala. It was released on 15 January 1976.

== Cast ==
- K. R. Vijaya
- Ravichandran
- Vijayakumar
- Vennira Aadai Nirmala
- S. A. Ashokan
- Thengai Srinivasan
- Suruli Rajan
- Kallapart Natarajan
- S. Rama Rao
- Master Sekhar
- Manorama
- S. N. Lakshmi
- A. Sakunthala
- V. R. Thilagam
- Roja Ramani

== Production ==
Bharathiraja was an assistant director.

== Soundtrack ==
The music was composed by V. Kumar, with lyrics by Kannadasan.

Track listing
| No. | Title | Singer(s) | Length |
|---|---|---|---|
| 1. | "Thangamugathil" | P. Susheela | 4:15 |
| 2. | "Unna Ninaicha" | P. Susheela, T. M. Soundararajan | 4:18 |
| 3. | "Ilamai Kovil" | Swarna, K. J. Yesudas | 4:04 |
| Total length: | | | 12:37 |

== Reception ==
Navamani praised the acting of star cast, Avinasi Mani's direction and Jagadeesan's dialogues. Kanthan of Kalki praised the acting of star cast but panned the humour, Sridhar-Roja Ramana's romantic track and Baby Rani's dialogues.
