= Poranthalum Ambalaiya Porakka Koodathu =

1993 film by N. K. Viswanathan

- Poster
- Directed by: N. K. Viswanathan
- Screenplay by: N. K. Viswanathan
- Produced by: T. S. Sethuraman; T. S. Saravanan
- Starring: Pandiarajan; Aishwarya
- Cinematography: N. K. Viswanathan
- Edited by: V. Udhayasankaran
- Music by: Bala Bharathi
- Production company: Kalyani Cine Productions
- Release date: 25 September 1993
- Country: India
- Language: Tamil

Poranthalum Ambalaiya Porakka Koodathu (transl. One should not be born as man) is a 1993 Indian Tamil-language comedy film written, directed and filmed by N. K. Viswanathan. The film stars Pandiarajan and Aishwarya. It was released on 25 September 1993.

== Cast ==
- Pandiarajan
- R. Sundarrajan
- Vennira Aadai Moorthy
- Vinu Chakravarthy
- Aishwarya
- Srividya
- Kovai Sarala
- K. R. Savithri
- Idichapuli Selvaraj
- Haja Sheriff
- Typist Gopu

== Production ==
Poranthalum Ambalaiya Porakka Koodathu was directed by N. K. Viswanathan who also wrote the screenplay and worked as cinematographer. The film was produced by T. S. Sethuraman and T. S. Saravanan under Kalyan Cine Productions. V. Udhayasankaran was the editor.

== Soundtrack ==
The soundtrack was composed by Bala Bharathi.

Track listing
No.	Title	Singer(s)	Length
1.	"Pothathu Pothathu"	Swarnalatha, S. P. Balasubrahmanyam	3:35
2.	"Amman Arul Maavilaku"	Malaysia Vasudevan, Minmini	4:46
3.	"Puthu Pavai Nan"	S. Janaki	4:05
4.	"Muthu Vadi Velan Unnaku"	Minmini	4:24
5.	"Chinna Kuyil Nanthan"	Minmini	2:35
Total length:			19:25

== Release and reception ==
Poranthalum Ambalaiya Porakka Koodathu was released on 25 September 1993. Malini Mannath of The Indian Express called it a "crass" film, but lauded Viswanathan's cinematography. The film was also reviewed by R. P. R. of Kalki.
