= Sankarlal =

- Tamil poster
- Directed by: T. N. Balu; N. K. Viswanathan
- Written by: T. N. Balu
- Produced by: T. N. Balu
- Starring: Kamal Haasan; Sridevi
- Cinematography: N. K. Viswanathan
- Edited by: V. Rajagopal
- Music by: Ilaiyaraaja; Gangai Amaran
- Production company: Balu Cine Arts
- Release dates: 15 August 1981 (Tamil); 6 February 1982 (Telugu)
- Country: India
- Languages: Tamil; Telugu

Sankarlal is a 1981 Indian Tamil-language action film, written, directed and produced by T. N. Balu. It stars Kamal Haasan in dual lead roles as father and son. Balu died half-way during production, and the film was eventually completed with N. K. Viswanathan as director. The film was simultaneously shot in the Telugu language as Andagaadu (transl. Handsome) with Allu Ramalingaiah and Rao Gopal Rao.

== Plot ==
The film begins with an ordinary man Dharmalingam vacationing in Ooty with his family where he is framed for murder by a criminal named Chelladurai. Dharmalingam is jailed while his wife, son Mohan and daughter Seetha all end up separated from each other. After several years, the vengeful Dharmalingam returns to confront Chelladurai as the secretive Sankarlal and also desperately is on the lookout for his lost family. Chelladurai has meanwhile kidnapped a girl named Hema for ransom and Mohan is deputed by Hema's father to rescue her. This results in Dharmalingam and Mohan locking horns in their fight against their common enemy Chelladurai.

== Cast ==
Cast (Tamil)	Cast (Telugu)	Role (Tamil)	Role (Telugu)
Kamal Haasan		Dharmalingam (Sankarlal)	Damodaram
Kamal Haasan		Mohan	Mohan
Sridevi		Hema	Hema
Seema		Seetha/Baabi	Seetha/Baabi
P. R. Varalakshmi		Dhanalakshmi	Dhanalakshmi
Suruli Rajan	Allu Ramalingaiah	Hema's father	Hema's father
R. S. Manohar	Rao Gopal Rao	Selladurai	Bhujangam
V. Gopalakrishnan		Maari	Madhava
Vennira Aadai Moorthy	Rallapalli	Hotel server	Hotel server
Hema			
Baby Babeetha			
Baby Vanthana			
S. A. Ashokan		Guest appearance	Guest appearance

=== Tamil version ===
- Suruli Rajan as Kanthasamy Pillai
- S. A. Ashokan as Natarajan (Guest appearance)

== Production ==
Balu died half-way during production, and the film was eventually completed with Viswanathan as director. Sripriya was considered for the leading female role, before Sridevi was finalised.

== Soundtrack ==
Tamil version

Song	Singers	Music	Lyrics	Length
"Elankiliyae Innum Vilangaliye"	Janaki, S. P. Balasubrahmanyam	Ilaiyaraaja	Pulamaipithan	04:33
"Ada Vaada Kannu"	S. P. Balasubrahmanyam	Gangai Amaran	Pulamaipithan	04:24
"Kasturi Maan ondru"	Janaki, Malaysia Vasudevan	Gangai Amaran	Pulamaipithan	04:36
"Thedinen"	Malaysia Vasudevan	Gangai Amaran	Gangai Amaran	04:24
"Unmai Yendrum Vellum"	Vani Jairam	Gangai Amaran	Panchu Arunachalam	04:13
"Paathikkallil"	Janaki, Malaysia Vasudevan, Kamal Haasan	Gangai Amaran	Pulamaipithan	04:27

The song "Paathikkallil" was not in the movie.

== Reception ==
Nalini Sastry of Kalki praised the acting of Sridevi and Seema, Viswanathan's cinematography but felt the film lacks pace and Ilaiyaraaja and Gangai Amaran's music offers nothing new and concluded Kamal Haasan, who was stepping up in recent times, has taken rest in this film.
