= Andru Sinthiya Ratham =

- Poster
- Directed by: R. Sundaram
- Written by: T. N. Balu
- Produced by: K. Balakrishnan; S. Kamatchi; R. M. Manikkam
- Starring: Jaishankar; Padmapriya
- Cinematography: Dutt
- Edited by: L. Balu
- Music by: V. Kumar
- Production company: Geetha Chitra
- Release date: 14 January 1977
- Running time: 121 minutes
- Country: India
- Language: Tamil

Andru Sinthiya Ratham (transl. The blood spilt then) is a 1977 Indian Tamil-language action film, directed by R. Sundaram and written by T. N. Balu. The film stars Jaishankar and Padmapriya. It was released on 14 January 1977 and did not perform well at the box office.

== Cast ==
- Jaishankar
- Padmapriya
- Manorama
- Sunandhini
- Thengai Srinivasan
- S. A. Ashokan
- Vennira Aadai Moorthy
- S. V. Ramadas
- T. K. Ramachandran

== Production ==
Andru Sinthiya Ratham was written by T. N. Balu and directed by R. Sundaram. The film was produced by K. Balakrishnan, S. Kamatchi and R. M. Manikkam for Geetha Chitra. Cinematography was handled by Dutt, and editing by L. Balu. Another film with the same title began production in the 1960s, but was later dropped. This film was shot in locations including Yercaud.

== Soundtrack ==
The soundtrack was composed by V. Kumar.

Track listing
No.	Title	Singer(s)	Length
1.	"Entha Kaathilum Periyathu"	T. M. Soundararajan
2.	"Nan Kannanalladhi"	T. M. Soundararajan
3.	"Ithunaal Ariyatha Mayakkam"	S. P. Balasubrahmanyam, P. Susheela
4.	"Brindavanam Yamuna Nadhi"	P. Susheela

== Release and reception ==
Andru Sinthiya Ratham was released on 14 January 1977, during Pongal. Kanthan of Kalki criticised the screenplay but praised Jaishankar for showing talent in the stunt sequences, and Manorama-Thengai Srinivasan's comedy. The film underperformed at the box office.
