= 1977 in film =

The year 1977 in film involved some significant events, with Star Wars becoming the highest-grossing movie of all-time and notably the releases of Close Encounters of the Third Kind and Annie Hall.

== Highest-grossing films (U.S.) ==
The top ten 1977 released films by box office gross in North America are as follows:

Highest-grossing films of 1977
Rank	Title	Distributor	Box-office gross
1	Star Wars	20th Century Fox	$221,280,994
2	Smokey and the Bandit	Universal	$126,737,428
3	Close Encounters of the Third Kind	Columbia	$116,395,460
4	Saturday Night Fever	Paramount	$94,213,184
5	The Goodbye Girl	Warner Bros.	$83,700,000
6	A Bridge Too Far	United Artists	$50,750,000
7	The Deep	Columbia	$47,346,365
8	The Spy Who Loved Me	United Artists	$46,838,673
9	Oh, God!	Warner Bros.	$41,687,243
10	Annie Hall	United Artists	$38,251,425

== Events ==
- February 23 – During a press conference at Sardi's in Manhattan, it is officially announced that Christopher Reeve will be playing the role of Superman.
- March 28 – At the 49th Academy Awards, Rocky picks up the Academy Award for Best Picture. Peter Finch, Faye Dunaway, and Beatrice Straight all win Oscars for their performances in Network for Best Actor, Best Actress, and Best Supporting Actress, while Jason Robards wins for Best Supporting Actor for his performance in All the President's Men. He will win again the following year, becoming the only person to win two consecutive Best Supporting Actor awards.
- May 25 – Star Wars opens in theatres and becomes the highest-grossing film of the year. The film revolutionises the use of special effects in film and television production. It also embraces the notion of omitting any sort of opening credits sequence. Lucas, told by the Directors Guild of America that he must have an opening credits sequence, instead distributes the film independently, sans the opening credits. The film's release is often considered one of the most important events in film history.
- June 22 – Walt Disney Productions releases The Rescuers, which brings back an interest in animation that had been lost to both filmgoers and critics throughout the beginning of the 1970s.
- November 16 – Close Encounters of the Third Kind opens to widespread critical acclaim and massive box office success, becoming one of the top-grossing films to date and cementing Steven Spielberg's status as one of the most talented and profitable film directors of all time.
- December 5 – The Solar System, produced and directed by Thomas G. Smith for Encyclopaedia Britannica Films, is released. It led to the producer hiring Industrial Light & Magic (ILM), a company producing visual effects for films such as the Star Wars and Indiana Jones films.

== Awards ==
Category/Organization	35th Golden Globe Awards January 28, 1978		31st BAFTA Awards March 16, 1978	50th Academy Awards April 3, 1978
Category/Organization	Drama	Musical or Comedy	31st BAFTA Awards March 16, 1978	50th Academy Awards April 3, 1978
Best Film	The Turning Point	The Goodbye Girl	Annie Hall	
Best Director	Herbert Ross; The Turning Point		Woody Allen; Annie Hall	
Best Actor	Richard Burton; Equus	Richard Dreyfuss; The Goodbye Girl	Peter Finch; Network	Richard Dreyfuss; The Goodbye Girl
Best Actress	Jane Fonda; Julia	Diane Keaton; Annie Hall; Marsha Mason; The Goodbye Girl	Diane Keaton; Annie Hall	
Best Supporting Actor	Peter Firth; Equus		Edward Fox; A Bridge Too Far	Jason Robards; Julia
Best Supporting Actress	Vanessa Redgrave; Julia		Jenny Agutter; Equus	Vanessa Redgrave; Julia
Best Screenplay, Adapted	Neil Simon; The Goodbye Girl		Woody Allen and Marshall Brickman; Annie Hall	Alvin Sargent; Julia
Best Screenplay, Original	Neil Simon; The Goodbye Girl		Woody Allen and Marshall Brickman; Annie Hall	Woody Allen and Marshall Brickman; Annie Hall
Best Original Score	John Williams; Star Wars		John Addison; A Bridge Too Far	John Williams; Star Wars; Jonathan Tunick; A Little Night Music
Best Original Song	"You Light Up My Life"; You Light Up My Life		N/A	"You Light Up My Life"; You Light Up My Life
Best Foreign Language Film	A Special Day		N/A	Madame Rosa

Palme d'Or (Cannes Film Festival):

Father and Master (Padre padrone), directed by Paolo and Vittorio Taviani, Italy

Golden Bear (Berlin Film Festival):

The Ascent (Voskhozhdeniye), directed by Larisa Shepitko, USSR

== 1977 films ==
=== By country/region ===
- List of American films of 1977
- List of Argentine films of 1977
- List of Australian films of 1977
- List of Bangladeshi films of 1977
- List of British films of 1977
- List of Canadian films of 1977
- List of French films of 1977
- List of Hong Kong films of 1977
- List of Indian films of 1977
  - List of Hindi films of 1977
  - List of Kannada films of 1977
  - List of Malayalam films of 1977
  - List of Marathi films of 1977
  - List of Tamil films of 1977
  - List of Telugu films of 1977
- List of Japanese films of 1977
- List of Mexican films of 1977
- List of Pakistani films of 1977
- List of South Korean films of 1977
- List of Soviet films of 1977
- List of Spanish films of 1977

=== By genre/medium ===
- List of action films of 1977
- List of animated feature films of 1977
- List of avant-garde films of 1977
- List of comedy films of 1977
- List of drama films of 1977
- List of horror films of 1977
- List of science fiction films of 1977
- List of thriller films of 1977
- List of western films of 1977

== Births ==
- January 1
  - Steven Robertson, Scottish actor
  - Jerry Yan, Taiwanese actor, model and singer
- January 6 – Genevieve O'Reilly, Irish actress
- January 7 – Dustin Diamond, American actor (d. 2021)
- January 8 – Amber Benson, American actress
- January 11
  - James Huang, American actor, producer and director
  - Devin Ratray, American actor, producer and writer
- January 12 – Piolo Pascual, Filipino actor
- January 13 – Orlando Bloom, English actor
- January 14 – Ruco Chan, Hong Kong actor
- January 15 – Ronald Zehrfeld, German actor
- January 17 – Leigh Whannell, Australian screenwriter, actor, producer and director
- January 19
  - Rob Delaney, American comedian, actor and writer
  - Taliesin Jaffe, American voice actor
- January 21 - Jerry Trainor, American actor
- January 22 - Matthew Newton, Australian actor, writer and director
- January 23 - Christian Tessier, Canadian actor and singer
- January 24 - Johann Urb, Estonian-American actor
- January 26 - Hemky Madera, American actor
- January 28
  - Zhao Tao, Chinese actress
  - Joey Fatone, American singer and actor
- January 29
  - Justin Hartley, American actor
  - Sam Jaeger, American actor and screenwriter
- January 31
  - Bobby Moynihan, American actor, comedian and writer
  - Kerry Washington, American actress
- February 6 - Josh Stewart, American actor
- February 7 - Susanne Pollatschek, Scottish-British actress
- February 9 – A. J. Buckley, Irish-Canadian actor
- February 16 – Paul Brittain, American actor and comedian
- February 17 – Isaac Kappy, American actor and musician (d. 2019)
- February 18
  - Ike Barinholtz, American actor, comedian, writer, director and producer
  - Kristoffer Polaha, American actor
- February 21 – Cyrine Abdelnour, Lebanese actress, and model
- February 24
  - Libero De Rienzo, Italian actor (d. 2021)
  - Kate Mulvany, Australian actress, playwright and screenwriter
- February 25 - Ingrid Oliver, British actress and comedian
- February 26 – James Wan, Australian director, producer and screenwriter
- February 27 – Ji Sung, South Korean actor
- March 2 – Heather McComb, American actress
- March 8 – James Van Der Beek, American actor (d. 2026)
- March 9 – Lydia Mackay, American voice actress
- March 13 - Adam G. Simon, American actor and screenwriter
- March 15 – Brian Tee, Japanese-born American actor
- March 19
  - Jorma Taccone, American comedian, director, actor and writer
  - Ebon Moss-Bachrach, American actor
- March 22 – Anabel Rodríguez Ríos, Venezuelan film director and screenwriter
- March 23
  - Daniel Espinosa, Swedish director
  - Joanna Page, Welsh actress and producer
  - Edwin Siu, Hong Kong actor and singer
  - Clayton Watson, Australian producer, actor, writer and director
- March 24
  - Olivia Burnette, American actress
  - Jessica Chastain, American actress
- March 25 – Édgar Ramírez, Venezuelan actor
- March 28 – Annie Wersching, American actress (d. 2023)
- April 2 – Michael Fassbender, Irish-German actor
- April 3 – Alice Lowe, English actress, writer and comedian
- April 6
  - Bill Holderman, American director, screenwriter and producer
  - Nacho Vigalondo, Spanish filmmaker
- April 8 – Ana de la Reguera, Mexican actress
- April 10 – Stephanie Sheh, American voice actress
- April 14
  - Jon Daly, American actor, comedian, writer and producer
  - Sarah Michelle Gellar, American actress
  - Rob McElhenney, American actor, writer, and producer
- April 16 – Tameka Empson, English actress
- April 19 – Bryan Spears, American film and television producer
- April 20 – Robert Wilfort, English actor
- April 23
  - John Cena, American professional wrestler and actor
  - Eric Edelstein, American actor
  - John Oliver, British-American comedian, producer, actor and television host
  - Kal Penn, American actor
- April 24
  - Eric Balfour, American actor and singer
  - Rebecca Mader, English actress
- April 25
  - Marguerite Moreau, American actress
  - Jessica Prunell, American former child actress
- April 26
  - Jason Earles, American actor
  - Tom Welling, American actor
  - McKenzie Westmore, American actress and singer
- May 2 – Jenna von Oÿ, American actress
- May 3 – Jeffrey Garcia, American actor and stand-up comedian
- May 4 - Emily Perkins, Canadian actress
- May 5 – Virginie Efira, Belgian-French actress
- May 10 – Todd Lowe, American actor
- May 11 - Andy On, American actor and martial artist
- May 12
  - Michael Jelenic, American animator, storyboard artist, screenwriter, producer and director
  - Rachel Wilson, Canadian actress
- May 13 – Samantha Morton, English actress
- May 14 – Jacky Ido, Burkinabé-born French actor
- May 15 – Ben Whitehead, English actor, voice artist and read-in artist
- May 16
  - Lynn Collins, American actress
  - Melanie Lynskey, New Zealand actress
  - Emilíana Torrini, Icelandic singer
- May 18 – Evan Helmuth, American actor (d. 2017)
- May 19 – Kelly Sheridan, Canadian voice actress
- May 20
  - Matt Czuchry, American actor
  - Angela Goethals, American former actress
- May 23
  - Caroline Amiguet, French actress
  - Richard Ayoade, British comedian, actor, filmmaker, writer, author and television presenter
  - Heather Wahlquist, American actress
- May 25 - Julian Bailey, Canadian actor
- May 27 – Anna Maxwell Martin, British actress
- May 31 – Eric Christian Olsen, American actor
- June 1
  - Christian Ditter, German director, producer and screenwriter
  - Danielle Harris, American actress
- June 2 – Zachary Quinto, American actor
- June 5 – Liza Weil, American actress
- June 11 - Shane Meier, Canadian actor
- June 14 – Sullivan Stapleton, Australian actor
- June 20 - Ronnie Gene Blevins, American character actor
- June 22
  - Bernadette Heerwagen, German actress
  - Denis Moschitto, German actor
- June 23 - Sian Heder, American filmmaker
- June 25 – Josh Braaten, American actor
- June 29 - Jeff Baena, American screenwriter and director (d. 2025)
- June 30 – Christopher Sommers, Irish actor
- July 1 – Liv Tyler, American actress
- July 4 – Vesela Kazakova, Bulgarian actress
- July 6 – Audrey Fleurot, French actress
- July 8 – Milo Ventimiglia, American actor
- July 10
  - Chiwetel Ejiofor, English actor
  - Cary Joji Fukunaga, American director, producer, screenwriter and cinematographer
  - Gwendoline Yeo, Singaporean actress
- July 11 - Edward Moss (impersonator), American actor
- July 12 - Steve Howey, American actor
- July 13
  - Alejandro Gómez Monteverde, Mexican filmmaker
  - Ashley Scott, American actress
  - Kari Wahlgren, American voice actress
- July 14 - Tim Downie, English actor and writer
- July 15 - Lana Parrilla, American actress
- July 18
  - Daniel and Luis Moncada, Honduran-American actors
  - Kelly Reilly, English actress
- July 22
  - Joaquim Dos Santos, Portuguese-American animator, storyboard artist, director, producer and writer
  - Parisa Fitz-Henley, Jamaican-born American actress
- July 23 - Shane McRae, American actor
- July 24
  - Danny Dyer, English actor and presenter
  - Michelle Buteau, American actress and comedian
- July 26
  - Tony Sampson, Canadian oiler, former actor and voice artist
  - Rebecca St. James, Australian-American singer-songwriter and actress
- July 27
  - Reda Kateb, French actor
  - Jonathan Rhys Meyers, Irish actor
- July 30
  - Javier Botet, Spanish actor
  - Jaime Pressly, American actress
- August 2
  - Edward Furlong, American actor
  - Artemis Pebdani, American actress
  - Krzysztof Soszynski, Polish-Canadian actor and retired mixed martial artist
- August 3 – Tómas Lemarquis, French-Icelandic actor
- August 8 – Lindsay Sloane, American actress
- August 10 – Yeşim Büber, Turkish actress
- August 13 - Damian O'Hare, Irish actor
- August 18
  - Mizuo Peck, American actress
  - Dar Salim, Iraqi-born Danish actor
- August 19 - Sara Martins, Portuguese-French actress
- August 23 – Kobna Holdbrook-Smith, Ghanaian-British actor
- August 25 - Jonathan Togo, American actor
- August 26 - Patrick Kennedy, English actor and director
- August 30
  - Raúl Castillo, American actor
  - Michael Gladis, American actor
  - Elden Henson, American actor
- September 3
  - Chen Shu, Chinese actress and singer
  - James Daniel Wilson, English actor and writer
- September 6 - Bertie Carvel, British actor
- September 8 – Nate Corddry, American actor and comedian
- September 11 – Ludacris, American actor and rapper
- September 15 – Tom Hardy, English actor
- September 19 – Kyle Cease, American actor and comedian
- September 25
  - Divya Dutta, Indian actress
  - Clea DuVall, American actress
  - Joel David Moore, American character actor and director
- September 27
  - Michael C. Maronna, American actor
  - Dan Starkey, English actor
- September 29 - Sasha Rionda, Mexican actress
- October 1 - Anna Madeley, English actress
- October 3 – Hassan Johnson, American actor, model and producer
- October 5
  - Randy Havens, American actor
  - Luke Roberts, English actor
- October 7 – Brandon Quinn, American actor
- October 8
  - Jamie Marchi, American voice actress
  - Travis Wester, American actor
- October 9 - Sam Spruell, British actor
- October 10 - Ali Suliman, Palestinian-Israeli actor
- October 11 – Matthew Bomer, American actor
- October 14 - Carmen Soo, Malaysian actress
- October 16 – Tamara Podemski, Canadian actress
- October 17 - Alimi Ballard, American actor
- October 18 – Peter Sohn, American animator, voice actor, storyboard artist and director
- October 19 – Jason Reitman, Canadian-American actor and filmmaker
- October 20 – Sam Witwer, American actor and musician
- October 26 – Jon Heder, American actor
- October 28 - Miloud Mourad Benamara, Algerian-born Italian actor
- October 29
  - Jon Abrahams, American actor
  - Brendan Fehr, Canadian actor
- November 1 - Martin Copping, Australian actor
- November 2 – Randy Harrison, American actor
- November 3 – Greg Plitt, American fitness model and actor (d. 2015)
- November 4 – Tom Vaughan-Lawlor, Irish actor
- November 10 – Brittany Murphy, American actress (d. 2009)
- November 11 – Scoot McNairy, American actor
- November 14 – Brian Dietzen, American actor
- November 15
  - Sean Murray, American actor
  - Ursula Yovich, Aboriginal Australian actress and singer
- November 16 – Maggie Gyllenhaal, American actress
- November 18 - Miranda Raison, British-French actress
- November 19 – Reid Scott, American actor
- November 21 – Michael Sorvino, American actor and producer
- November 23 – Lateef Crowder dos Santos, Brazilian-American actor and stuntman
- November 24 – Colin Hanks, American actor, director and producer
- November 25 - Lisa Dwan, Irish actress
- November 30 - Nelsan Ellis, American actor (d. 2017)
- December 1
  - Akiva Schaffer, American writer, director, actor, comedian and musician
  - Nate Torrence, American comedic actor
- December 5 – Armando Riesco, Puerto Rican actor
- December 6 - Jefferson Hall, English actor
- December 7 - Chris Chalk, American actor
- December 8
  - Maarja Jakobson, Estonian actress
  - Matthias Schoenaerts, Belgian actor
- December 10 – Emmanuelle Chriqui, Canadian actress
- December 15 – Geoff Stults, American actor
- December 17 - Katheryn Winnick, Canadian actress
- December 21
  - Colombe Jacobsen-Derstine, American actress
  - Kevin Miller, American voice actor, comedian and podcast host
  - Gregory Siff, American writer and actor
- December 24 - Michael Raymond-James, American actor
- December 28
  - Vanessa Ferlito, American actress
  - Michael Spears, Indigenous American actor
- December 30 – Lucy Punch, English actress
- December 31 - Psy, South Korean singer

== Deaths ==
Month
Date
Name
Age
Country
Profession
Notable films
January
3
Tom Gries
54
US
Director
- Will Penny
- The Hawaiians
5
Onslow Stevens
74
US
Actor
- Appointment in Berlin
- Angel on My Shoulder
6
Niall MacGinnis
63
Ireland
Actor
- Martin Luther
- Helen of Troy
12
Henri-Georges Clouzot
69
France
Director, Screenwriter
- The Wages of Fear
- Les Diaboliques
14
Peter Finch
60
UK
Actor
- Network
- Sunday Bloody Sunday
18
Yvonne Printemps
82
France
Actress, Singer
- Le Voyage en Amérique
- The Duel
26
Margaret Hayes
60
US
Actress
- Blackboard Jungle
- Good Day for a Hanging
31
Daniel Mainwaring
74
US
Screenwriter
- Out of the Past
- Invasion of the Body Snatchers
February
3
Pauline Starke
76
US
Actress
- The Viking
- What Men Want
17
Edward G. Boyle
78
Canada
Production Designer
- The Apartment
- Gone with the Wind
18
Andy Devine
71
US
Actor
- Stagecoach
- The Man Who Shot Liberty Valance
22
Edith Barrett
70
US
Actress
- Ladies in Retirement
- I Walked with a Zombie
27
Allison Hayes
46
US
Actress
- Count Three and Pray
- Gunslinger
28
Eddie "Rochester" Anderson
71
US
Actor
- Cabin in the Sky
- It's a Mad, Mad, Mad, Mad World
March
8
Henry Hull
86
US
Actor
- Werewolf of London
- The Buccaneer
25
Nunnally Johnson
79
US
Screenwriter, Director
- The Grapes of Wrath
- The Dirty Dozen
27
Diana Hyland
41
US
Actress
- One Man's Way
- The Chase
April
17
Marjorie Gateson
86
US
Actress
- Private Number
- The King's Vacation
19
Marion Gering
75
Russia
Director
- Devil and the Deep
- Rumba
21
Gummo Marx
83
US
Actor, Agent

28
Ricardo Cortez
76
US
Actor
- The Case of the Black Cat
- The Maltese Falcon
May
10
Joan Crawford
71
US
Actress
- Mildred Pierce
- What Ever Happened to Baby Jane?
15
Herbert Wilcox
87
UK
Director, Producer
- Odette
- Irene
21
Dorothy Christy
70
US
Actress
- Parlor, Bedroom and Bath
- Bright Eyes
31
William Castle
63
US
Producer, Director
- Rosemary's Baby
- House on Haunted Hill
June
2
Stephen Boyd
45
Ireland
Actor
- Ben-Hur
- Fantastic Voyage
3
Roberto Rossellini
71
Italy
Director, Screenwriter
- Rome, Open City
- Germany, Year Zero
5
Luis César Amadori
75
Italy/Argentina
Director, Screenwriter
- Almafuerte
- Albéniz
13
Matthew Garber
21
UK
Actor
- Mary Poppins
- The Gnome-Mobile
14
Alan Reed
69
US
Actor
- Friendly Persuasion
- The Desperate Hours
19
Geraldine Brooks
51
US
Actress
- An Act of Murder
- The Reckless Moment
20
Abner Biberman
68
US
Director, Actor
- The Night Runner
- Behind the High Wall
July
2
William H. Ziegler
67
US
Film Editor
- My Fair Lady
- Auntie Mame
22
Erik Chitty
70
UK
Actor
- Doctor Zhivago
- Lola
August
3
Alfred Lunt
84
US
Actor
- Sally of the Sawdust
- Second Youth
14
George Oppenheimer
77
US
Screenwriter
- Libeled Lady
- Adventures of Don Juan
16
Elvis Presley
42
US
Actor, Singer
- Love Me Tender
- Blue Hawaii
17
Delmer Daves
73
US
Screenwriter, Director
- 3:10 to Yuma
- Dark Passage
19
Groucho Marx
86
US
Actor, Screenwriter
- Duck Soup
- A Night at the Opera
19
Peter Dyneley
56
UK
Actor
- Thunderbirds Are Go
- Thunderbird 6
21
Danny Lockin
34
US
Actor
- Hello Dolly!
22
Sebastian Cabot
59
UK
Actor
- The Time Machine
- The Jungle Book
22
Alex Segal
62
US
Director
- Ransom!
- Harlow
29
Jean Hagen
54
US
Actress
- Singin' in the Rain
- The Asphalt Jungle
31
H. C. Potter
72
US
Director
- Mr. Blandings Builds His Dream House
- The Farmer's Daughter
September
2
Stephen Dunne
59
US
Actor
- Ten Thousand Bedrooms
- The Woman from Tangier
8
Zero Mostel
62
US
Actor
- The Producers
- A Funny Thing Happened on the Way to the Forum
October
3
Tay Garnett
83
US
Director
- The Postman Always Rings Twice
- Cheers for Miss Bishop
5
Fred F. Finklehoffe
67
US
Screenwriter
- Meet Me in St. Louis
- The Stooge
14
Bing Crosby
74
US
Actor, Singer
- Going My Way
- White Christmas
31
Joan Tetzel
56
US
Actress
- The Paradine Case
- The File on Thelma Jordon
November
4
Betty Balfour
74
UK
Actress
- Champagne
- 29 Acacia Avenue
9
Gertrude Astor
90
US
Actress
- The Strong Man
- The Cat and the Canary
15
William C. McGann
84
US
Director
- Times Square Playboy
- Girls on Probation
18
Victor Francen
89
Belgium
Actor
- San Antonio
- Hell and High Water
25
Richard Carlson
65
US
Actor
- Creature from the Black Lagoon
- The Helen Morgan Story
30
Olga Petrova
93
UK
Actress, Screenwriter
- Exile
- To the Death
30
Terence Rattigan
66
UK
Screenwriter
- The Yellow Rolls-Royce
- The V.I.P.s
December
4
Leila Hyams
72
US
Actress
- Freaks
- Island of Lost Souls
18
Cyril Ritchard
79
Australia
Actor
- Blackmail
- Half a Sixpence
19
Jacques Tourneur
73
France
Director
- Out of the Past
- Cat People
25
Charlie Chaplin
88
UK
Actor, Director, Screenwriter
- The Great Dictator
- Modern Times
26
Howard Hawks
81
US
Director
- The Big Sleep
- Rio Bravo
28
Charlotte Greenwood
87
US
Actress
- Oklahoma!
- The Opposite Sex

== Film debuts ==
- Jeannetta Arnette – Teenage Graffiti
- Raymond J. Barry – Between the Lines
- Tom Berenger – The Sentinel
- Demián Bichir – Fantoche
- Hart Bochner – Islands in the Stream
- Powers Boothe – The Goodbye Girl
- Carole Bouquet – That Obscure Object of Desire
- Guy Boyd – Between the Lines
- Joan Chen – Youth
- Beverly D'Angelo – The Sentinel
- Judy Davis – High Rolling
- Brian Dennehy – Looking for Mr. Goodbar
- Fran Drescher – Saturday Night Fever
- Danny Elfman (film composer) – I Never Promised You a Rose Garden
- Charles Fleischer – One on One
- Mel Gibson – Summer City
- Gary Grubbs – For the Love of Benji
- Steve Guttenberg – Rollercoaster
- Luis Guzmán – Short Eyes
- Mark Hamill – Wizards
- John Heard – Between the Lines
- Helen Hunt – Rollercoaster
- Michael Ironside – Outrageous!
- Krystyna Janda – Pani Bovary to ja
- Mimí Lazo – The Smoking Fish
- Bruce McGill – Handle with Care
- Michael McKean – Cracking Up
- Kevin McNally – The Spy Who Loved Me
- Richard Moll – Brigham
- Joe Morton – Between the Lines
- Paul Pape – Saturday Night Fever
- Pete Postlethwaite – The Duellists
- Bill Raymond – Sudden Death
- Sheryl Lee Ralph – A Piece of the Action
- Sy Richardson – Cinderella
- Richard Riehle – Joyride
- Chelcie Ross – Keep My Grave Open
- William Sanderson – Fight for Your Life
- Tony Sirico – Hughes and Harlow: Angels in Hell
- Meryl Streep – Julia
- Sven-Ole Thorsen – Mind Your Back, Professor
- Stephen Tobolowsky – Keep My Grave Open
- Craig Wasson – Rollercoaster
- Sigourney Weaver – Annie Hall
- Robin Williams – Can I Do It... 'Till I Need Glasses?
- Lambert Wilson – Julia
- Rita Wilson – The Day It Came to Earth
- Penelope Wilton – Joseph Andrews
