= Veguli Penn =

- Theatrical release poster
- Directed by: S. S. Devadoss
- Screenplay by: S. S. Devadoss; Vietnam Veedu Sundaram (dialogues)
- Based on: Vellikizhamai by Kalaignanam
- Produced by: S. M. Abdul Gaffar
- Starring: See Cast
- Cinematography: M. Krishnasamy
- Edited by: J. Stanley
- Music by: V. Kumar
- Production company: Jennat Combines
- Distributed by: Jennat Combines
- Release date: 2 July 1971
- Running time: 123 minutes
- Country: India
- Language: Tamil

Veguli Penn (transl. An Innocent Girl) is a 1971 Indian Tamil-language mystery drama film directed and co-written by S. S. Devadoss. The film features an ensemble cast including Gemini Ganesh, Devika, R. Muthuraman, Nagesh, V. K. Ramasamy, V. Nirmala, Radhika, K. Balaji and S. Varalakshmi. It revolves around a woman who becomes pregnant, and the mystery surrounding the father of her child.

Veguli Penn is an adaptation of the play Vellikizhamai (transl. Friday) by Kalaignanam. The film was released on 2 July 1971, received critical acclaim and became a commercial success, with a 100-day run in theatres. It also won the National Film Award for Best Feature Film in Tamil at the 19th National Film Awards.

== Plot ==
Inspector Ramu and Janaki have been married for ten years and have no children. Janaki's sister Radha, an ingénue, lives with them. Janaki constantly coddles Radha, and is close to Doctor Lakshmi and her son Manohar, a psychologist. Ramu's brother, Captain Muthu, returns to Chennai. On the train, he meets Rani, daughter of Bhoopathy Raja, a local zamindar. Rani is attracted to Muthu after she reads about his bravery award. Rani's cousin Mohan likes Radha and she also likes his kind personality. When Muthu returns home, he becomes attracted to Radha. One day Muthu sees Radha loitering on the road and sends her home.

On her way back, Radha stops at Manohar's place, where he tries to hypnotise her. Muthu searches for her when she does not return. He and Janaki find her chatting with Manohar before Janaki reprimands her. Ramu's family, Mohan, Rani, and her father go to Kodaikanal on vacation. Janaki notices Mohan's interest in Radha and warns him. Muthu rejects Rani's advances and makes it clear that he loves Radha. Janaki and Ramu decide to fix Muthu's marriage with Radha, but Radha refuses, saying she cannot marry someone who always scolds her. Both Janaki and Ramu decide to proceed with their plan. Ramu leaves for Trivandrum to investigate a case.

Radha falls unconscious after Muthu drugs her drink. Muthu walks into her room that night before he leaves for the army the following day. Three months later, Ramu returns. Janaki notices changes in Radha's health and takes her to Lakshmi, who confirms that Radha is pregnant. Janaki is shocked and does not know who the father is. She informs Ramu about the pregnancy; Ramu assumes that Janaki is pregnant and shows excitement.

Ramu's superiors order him to travel to London for an urgent investigation while Janaki decides to find the man responsible for Radha's pregnancy. Janaki indirectly informs Manohar and Mohan. Janaki takes Radha to their estate in Kodaikanal; a local doctor, Manjula, attends to Radha, who delivers a baby boy. Ramu returns from London and is excited to see his son, Babu, with Janaki. She tries to tell the truth, but he does not listen. Manjula visits Chennai with her husband and visits Ramu's house. Manjula starts talking about Radha's delivery before Janaki stops her. Muthu returns after being discharged for medical reasons, and Janaki suspects Muthu is the father of the child. Mohan meets Janaki and tells her that he is innocent and that he also suspects that Muthu got Radha pregnant.

Janaki shares her suspicion about Manohar. Ramu decides to wed Radha to Muthu but Janaki stalls. She finally agrees to the marriage, but Muthu refuses, stating that he does not wish to marry the girl who refused him a year back. Mohan confronts Manohar about Radha's pregnancy; Manohar protests his innocence and reveals that Muthu had come to get sedatives. Mohan informs Janaki and now she confirms that Muthu is the one. Janaki gets a call that Muthu will marry Rani at Tiruttani. She tries to stop the marriage with Mohan, but is too late. Janaki brings the newlyweds home. At home, Rani illtreats the child and Radha slaps her. Rani feels that Radha is jealous of her marriage to Muthu and decides to leave.

Radha comes for Babu's first birthday party, but Janaki takes her aside and scolds her for coming home when they still have not determined the baby's father. Ramu overhears and he demands the truth from Janaki. Radha now confesses that Babu is her child. Ramu demands to know the father's identity; Mohan and Manohar point at Muthu. Ramu draws his revolver on Muthu, who reveals the truth: he was about to drink his medication when he heard a car and rushed into his room, assuming it was Janaki. Ramu is the one who arrived and drank the medication before entering Radha's room by mistake. A disoriented Ramu came out of Radha's room and informed Muthu that Janaki was sleeping inside and that he was leaving for work. Hearing this, Janaki asks Ramu to accept Radha as his wife before dying from a heart attack.

== Cast ==
- Gemini Ganesh as Ramu
- Devika as Janaki
- R. Muthuraman as Muthu
- Nagesh as Mohan
- V. K. Ramasamy as Bhoopathy Raja
- V. Nirmala as Radha
- Radhika as Rani
- K. Balaji as Manohar
- S. Varalakshmi as Lakshmi

== Production ==
Veguli Penn was directed by S. S. Devadoss, and is based on Kalaignanam's play Vellikizhamai. The film was produced by Devadoss and his wife Devika's company Jennat Combines, though S. M. Abdul Gaffar received sole producer credit. Cinematography was handled by M. Krishnasamy and editing by J. Stanley. While Devadoss also wrote the screenplay, the dialogues were written by Vietnam Veedu Sundaram. On the first day of shooting, N. T. Rama Rao clapped the shot.

== Soundtrack ==
The soundtrack was composed by V. Kumar.

Track listing
No.	Title	Lyrics	Singer(s)	Length
1.	"Engellam Valaiosai Ketkindradho"	Kannadasan	T. M. Soundararajan	3:41
2.	"Mullukku Roja Sondham"	Kannadasan	P. Susheela	3:42
3.	"Neethaan Mohiniyo"	Panchu Arunachalam	K. Swarna, A. L. Raghavan	3:38
4.	"Kannana Kannurangu Kattazhagu"	Kannadasan	P. Susheela	3:18
5.	"Thiththikkindratha Muththamittathu"	Kannadasan	K. Jamuna Rani	3:33
Total length:				17:52

== Release and reception ==
Veguli Penn was released on 2 July 1971. No distributor was willing to buy the film as they felt it was too "arty", which prompted Jennat Combines to take over distribution. The film received critical acclaim and became a commercial success with a 100-day run in theatres. Dinamani Kathir appreciated Devika's performance and the dialogues but criticised the comedy, though the actors Nagesh and V. K. Ramasamy were not to blame. It won the National Film Award for Best Feature Film in Tamil at the 19th National Film Awards. Devika won the Chennai Film Fans Association Award for Best Supporting Actress.

== Bibliography ==
- Dhananjayan, G. (2014). Pride of Tamil Cinema: 1931–2013. Blue Ocean Publishers. OCLC 898765509.
- Krishnan, Prabha; Dighe, Anita (1990). Affirmation and Denial Construction of Femininity on Indian Television. SAGE Publications. ISBN 978-0-8039-9643-4.
