= Soappu Seeppu Kannadi =

- Soappu Seepu Kannadi
- Directed by: Thirumalai–Mahalingam
- Story by: Somanathan.T
- Produced by: P. M. Nachimuthu; G.K.Selvaraj
- Starring: Nagesh; Vijaya Nirmala; Karunanidhi
- Cinematography: G. Vittal Rao
- Edited by: A. Paul Duraisingam
- Music by: T. K. Ramamoorthy
- Production company: Karthikeya Films
- Release date: March 15, 1968
- Running time: 138 minutes
- Country: India
- Language: Tamil

Soappu Seeppu Kannadi (transl. Soap, Comb, Mirror) is a 1968 Indian Tamil-language comedy film starring Nagesh and Vijaya Nirmala. It is produced by Karthikeya Films and directed by Thirumalai–Mahalingam. The film was released on 15 March 1968.

== Plot ==
Madhusudhanan, the eldest son of a rich respectable family, is compelled by his family to get married. Unwilling to marry before getting an employment on his own, even though he does not require it due to his family background, he leaves his home to escape family pressure to marry. He gets into a train without a ticket and gets caught by a ticket checker. Along with him, another boy Sadha who is also from a rich family gets caught for the same reason and both are thrown off of the train. Both roam around the city until they rescue a man from drowning in the river while fishing. In return, he offers to hire Madhu as a salesman and Sadha as a driver in his cosmetics company. Madhu performs his best to achieve a target of ₹5,000 (equivalent to ₹260,000 or US$2,700 in 2023) per day. An acquaintance suggests he should visit a house at Shennoy Nagar, where he can expect a good business order.

Latha is a college student and the daughter of a businessman in Shennoy Nagar. Latha's mother leaves to visit her relatives' home to plan for her daughter's marriage. Latha, her father and their cook have separate keys to the home for convenience. Madhu visits Shennoy Nagar, which is Latha's home to get an order. Latha's father, who does not know Madhu is inside the home, locks the house and leaves. Now Madhu is trapped inside a house at Shennoy Nagar. Sadha searches for him in and around Shennoy Nagar, but could not find him. Latha returns home and faints on seeing a stranger. Madhu convinces her by explaining his situation. Slowly, both develop an interest in each other and become involved. Latha's father has to leave for Bombay and takes Latha to her aunt's house. Latha promises Madhu that she will return by midnight without her aunt's knowledge. Sadha, who searches for his friend, enquires about him to a group of robbers. He tells them that his friend has company's money with him. The robbers plan to loot the money.

Latha and the robbers come to the home at midnight. Madhu and Latha struggle to save the money from the thieves, but in vain. Madhu chases the robbers and passers-by mistake Madhu as thief and call 101 fire department instead of 100 to call police. People from fire department arrive and rush to put out the fire on seeing smoke, which is actually not fire smoke, but flour dust. The robbers are caught by the patrol police and the money is saved. After many confusions and explanations, Madhu understands that he actually arrived to the home of the girl whom his family wanted him to marry. Madhu agrees to get married on the account he has a job on his own, as per his wish.

== Cast ==
- Nagesh as Madhusudhanan (Madhu)
- Vijaya Nirmala as Latha
- S. V. Sahasranamam as Appu Rangam Latha's Father
- A. Veerappan as Sadha
- A. Karunanidhi as Arumugam Cook
- Typist Gopu as Annamalai Kurangu mark Toilets Owner elder son
- Usilai Mani as Kurangu mark Toilets Owner
- Karikol Raju
- A. K. Veerasamy as Madhu's father
- C. K. Saraswathi as Gomathi

== Production ==
The film was shot at Gobichettipalayam. A cow was borrowed for filming.

== Soundtrack ==
Soundtrack was composed by T. K. Ramamoorthy.

No.	Title	Singer(s)	Length
1.	"Thookkam Kannile"	P. Susheela
2.	"Yaathum Oorada"	T. M. Soundararajan, A. L. Raghavan
3.	"Nichayam Naane"	P. Susheela

== Reception ==
Kalki appreciated the film for its comedy.
