= Loose Mohan =

Indian actor

- Born: Arumugam Mohanasundaram; 8 February 1928; Conjeevaram, Madras Presidency, British India (now Kanchipuram, Tamil Nadu, India)
- Died: 16 September 2012 (age 84); Chennai, Tamil Nadu, India
- Occupation: Actor
- Years active: 1967–2002

Arumugam Mohanasundaram (8 February 1928 – 16 September 2012), popularly known as Loose Mohan was an Indian actor who had acted as a comedian in over 1000 Tamil films. He is credited with popularizing Madras Bashai, a dialect of Tamil language spoken in Chennai city.

== Early life ==
Born in Kanchipuram, son of old actor "Loose Arumugam", Mohan migrated to Madras at an early age and debuted at age 16 in the 1944 film Harichandra as P. U. Chinnappa's son. However, most of his successes were in the late 1970s and 1980s when he acted as a comedian alongside stars such as Kamal Haasan and Rajinikanth.

== Career ==
He acted as servant in the movie "Kaththiruntha Kangal" 1962 film with Savithri and Gemini Ganesan. His breakthrough movie as a comedian was the 1979 film Rosapoo Ravikaikari, after which he acted in more than 1000 films, including four movies in Marathi and one each in Bhojpuri, Hindi and Tulu. In 2000, Mohan was awarded the Kalaimamani award by the Government of Tamil Nadu.

== Filmography ==
This is a partial filmography. You can expand it.

Year	Film	Role	Note
1967	Raja Veetu Pillai	Hotel customer	Debut film
1968	Enga Oor Raja	Fruit Seller	
1968	Kuzhanthaikkaga		
1969	Anbalippu	The buyer	
1973	Kattila Thottila	Milk Man	
1974	Kadavul Mama		Credited as 'Bracket Mohan'
1974	Akkarai Pachai	Peon	
1976	Needhikku Thalaivanangu	Muthiya's sidekick	
1976	Madhana Maaligai		
1977	Navarathinam		
1977	Meenava Nanban		
1977	Uyarnthavargal	Srikanth 's sidekick	
1978	Sattam En Kaiyil		
1979	Poonthalir	Beggar	
1979	Rosappu Ravikkaikari	Sembattayan's disciple	Credited as 'Bracket Mohan'
1980	Vishwaroopam	Rowdy's sidekick	
1980	Bhama Rukmani		
1982	Ayiram Muthangal		
1982	Pattanathu Rajakkal		
1982	Vasandhathil Or Naal		
1982	Simla Special		
1983	Sandhippu		
1983	Oru Kai Parpom		
1983	Uruvangal Maralam		
1984	Kuva Kuva Vaathugal		
1984	Madras Vathiyar		
1984	Simma Soppanam		
1984	Vai Pandal		
1985	Karaiyai Thodatha Alaigal		
1985	Needhiyin Nizhal		
1985	Avan		
1985	Andha Oru Nimidam		
1985	Naam Iruvar		
1986	Naanum Oru Thozhilali		
1987	Vairagyam		
1987	Kachchi Kali		Hindi film
1987	Kavalan Avan Kovalan	a hotel waiter	
1988	Aval Mella Sirithal		
1988	Oorai Therinjikitten		
1989	Mappilai		
1990	Ulagam Pirandhadhu Enakkaga		
1990	En Kadhal Kanmani	Mental man	
1991	Pondatti Pondattithan		
1991	Jenma Natchathram		
1993	Pon Vilangu		
1994	Vaanga Partner Vaanga		
1994	Subramaniya Swamy		
1994	Pavithra		
1995	Aanazhagan		
1996	En Aasai Thangachi		
1998	Kumbakonam Gopalu	Colony resident	
2001	Rishi	Drunk lorry driver	
2002	Azhagi	Pandu's father-in-law	

== Later life and death ==
Mohan acted in his last film role in 2002 (Azhagi). He was forced to quit acting due to his deteriorating health. In 2009, Mohan filed a case against his son Karthik for neglecting his health. He died on 16 September 2012, aged 84, from respiratory problems.

== Sources ==
- "Loose Mohan passes away". The Times of India. 16 September 2012.
- "Loose Mohan alleges negligence by son". CNN-IBN. 22 October 2011. Archived from the original on 5 December 2011.
