= Uma Sundari =

- Theatrical release poster
- Directed by: P. Pullayya
- Screenplay by: P. Pullayya
- Story by: Vempati Sadasivabrahmam
- Produced by: M. Somasundaram
- Starring: N. T. Rama Rao; Sriranjani Jr.
- Cinematography: P. Rama Swamy
- Edited by: K. Govinda Swamy
- Music by: Ashwathama
- Production company: Jupiter Pictures Pvt Ltd
- Release date: 20 July 1956
- Running time: 169 mins
- Country: India
- Language: Telugu

Uma Sundari is a 1956 Indian Telugu-language film, produced by M. Somasundaram under the Jupiter Pictures Pvt. Ltd. banner and directed by P. Pullayya. It stars N. T. Rama Rao, Sriranjani Jr. and features music composed by Ashwathama.

== Cast ==
- N. T. Rama Rao as Vijaya Rayalu
- Sriranjani Jr. as Uma Sundari
- V. Nagayya as Raja Shekarudu
- Relangi as Alamkara Bhupathi
- Nagabhushanam as Shiva
- Vangara
- Peketi Sivaram
- Kannamba as Neelaveni
- Surabhi Balasaraswathi

== Soundtrack ==
Uma Sundari

Film score by Ashwathama
- Released: 1956
- Genre: Soundtrack
- Producer: Ashwathama

Music composed by Ashwathama. Lyrics were written by Vempati Sadasivabrahmam.

S. No.	Song title	Singers	length
1	Amma Sailajata	Jikki	
2	Ammalara Raare	P. Leela	
3	Bhale Raju Vedale	Pithapuram	
4	Raaku Raaku	Madhavapeddi Satyam, Satyavathi	
5	Raavamma Rani	Satyavathi	
6	Yendukoi Reraju	Ghantasala, Jikki	
7	Raavoi Raavoi	V. Nagayya	
8	Illuvakili Veedi Poyadaru	Jikki	
9	Daatipogalada Naa Cheyi	N. L. Ganasaraswathi	
10	Pooni Bandi Pooni	Pithapuram	
11	Amba Gunanikiramba	V. Nagayya	
12	Raave Raave Sinnadana	Pithapuram	
13	Aadadavu Vachina	Ghantasala	
14	Anna Chellelu	Jikki	
15	Taarasillina Baatasarulu	Ghantasala	
16	Jeeva Thommidi	Pithapuram	
17	Idhi Maya Sasaamtham	Pithapuram	
18	Verri Mudiri	Pithapuram	
19	Nammakuraa	Ghantasala, Pithapuram	
20	Devaa Uma Mahesa	Ghantasala	
