= Anjal Petti 520 =

- Poster
- Directed by: T. N. Balu
- Written by: T. N. Balu
- Produced by: N. Vasudeva Menon
- Starring: Sivaji Ganesan; B. Saroja Devi
- Music by: R. Govardhanam
- Production company: Bharath Movies
- Release date: 27 June 1969
- Country: India
- Language: Tamil

Anjal Petti 520 (transl. Post box 520) is a 1969 Indian Tamil-language comedy film directed by T. N. Balu and produced by N. Vasudeva Menon. The film stars Sivaji Ganesan, B. Saroja Devi, M. N. Nambiar and Nagesh. It was released on 27 June 1969.

== Plot ==
Prabhu is the Chennai Manager in a baby food company whose head office is at Madurai. He is a very talented Manager and his MD assures him of a promotion to the General Manager position. Meanwhile, Prabhu gets information that his MD is not promoting him. Prabhu becomes angry and submits a written resignation, in which he abuses his company MD. He drops the letter in post box 520 (Anjal Petti 520). On the next day, Prabhu receives a telegram informing him of his promotion. Prabhu realises his mistake and is desperate to recover the letter he had posted to post box 520. There starts the story of him chasing the letter and getting messed up with conspiracy by villains and finally coming out of all his problems.

== Cast ==
- Sivaji Ganesan as Prabhu
- B. Saroja Devi as Saratha
- Major Sundarrajan as Sivachidambaram
- M. N. Nambiar as Nagarajan
- S. V. Ramadas as Moorthy
- K. D. Santhanam as Somasundaram
- Senthamarai as Karmegam
- R. Balasubramaniam as Kanagasabai
- K. R. Ramsingh as Mangat
- K. A. Thangavelu as Kanakkappar
- Nagesh as Chandru / Stephan
- Manorama as Stella
- Thengai Srinivasan as Ananth
- Vennira Aadai Moorthy as Somu
- Suruli Rajan as Ramanujam
- Typist Gopu as Gopu
- O. A. K. Thevar as Climax Lawyer
- Vijaya Lalitha as Dancer
- Seethalakshmi as Prabhu Aunty
- Natarajan Iyer as Climax Judge
- S. A. Kannan as Ravanamoorthy
- Natarajan as Court Dawali
- Comedy Shanmugam as Post Man
- Pakoda Kadhar as Home Helper

== Soundtrack ==
The music was composed by R. Govardhanam.

Song	Singers	Lyrics
"Manjal Mugamadiyo Santhana Silaye"	T. M. Soundararajan, P. Susheela	Kannadasan
"Pathu Pathinaru"	T. M. Soundararajan, L. R. Eswari	Kannadasan
"Thirumagal En Veetai"	P. Susheela	Vaali
"Aathi Manithan"	L. R. Eswari	Vaali

== Reception ==
The Indian Express wrote, "Stringing together a few incidents, interesting in themselves but violating logic does not guarantee good entertainment, let alone make a novel movie."
