= N. K. Viswanathan =

Film director

- Born: 23 April 1941; Namanur(Sivagangai district)
- Died: April 25, 2017 (aged 76)
- Occupations: Director, cinematographer
- Years active: 1978-2017

N. K. Viswanathan (died 25 March 2017) was an Indian film director and cinematographer who has worked on Tamil films. After beginning his career working as a cinematographer for Tamil films during the 1980s, he branched into film direction and made commercially successful films during the 1990s.

== Career ==
Viswanathan appeared as the cinematographer for many films since the 1970s predominantly worked in films directed by Rama Narayanan and also helped recommend actor Sathyaraj for his first role in Sattam En Kaiyil (1978). At the insistence of Kamal Haasan, he directed Sankarlal (1981) when the film's director T. N. Balu died during the shoot. He began directing films in the 1990s, working on family dramas.

In the early 2000s, he worked on several devotional films as a cinematographer and developed his knowledge of CGI and VFX related scenes. Viswanathan went on to direct Jaganmohini (2009), a remake of the 1978 film of the same name, with Namitha and Nila starring. Despite creating attention prior to release, it opened to mixed reviews, with a critic citing that the film felt "dated".

== Death ==
He died on 25 April 2017 due to cardiac arrest.

== Filmography ==
=== As director ===
Year	Film	Notes
1981	Sankarlal	Completed the film after death of T. N. Balu
1990	Periya Veetu Pannakkaran	
1990	Inaindha Kaigal	
1992	Nadodi Pattukkaran	
1993	Poranthalum Ambalaiya Porakka Koodathu	
1994	Pondattiye Deivam	
1994	Pudhupatti Ponnuthayi	
1994	Periya Marudhu	
1995	Varraar Sandiyar	
1996	Purushan Pondatti	Tamil Nadu State Film Award for Best Film (3rd Prize)
2009	Jaganmohini	

=== As cinematographer ===
- Uyarndhavargal (1977)
- Sattam En Kaiyil (1978)
- Kalyanaraman (1979)
- Rusi Kanda Poonai (1980)
- Meendum Kokila (1981)
- Kadal Meengal (1981)
- Sankarlal (1981)
- Ellam Inba Mayyam (1981)
- Karaiyellam Shenbagapoo (1981)
- Manaivi Solle Manthiram (1983)
- Engal Kural (1985)
- Urimai (1985)
- Chain Jayapal (1985)
- Karimedu Karuvayan (1986)
- Veeran Veluthambi (1987)
- Megam Karuththirukku (1987)
- Sahadevan Mahadevan (1988)
- Enga Ooru Kavalkaran (1988)
- Thangamani Rangamani (1989)
- Paandi Nattu Thangam (1989)
- Sendhoora Devi (1991)
- Purushan Enakku Arasan (1992)
- Kaviya Thalaivan (1992)
- Thirupathi Ezhumalai Venkatesa (1999)
- Rajakali Amman (2000)
- Kuberan (2000)
- Kandha Kadamba Kathir Vela (2000)
- Palayathu Amman (2000)
- Nageswari (2001)
- Viswanathan Ramamoorthy (2001)
- Kottai Mariamman (2001)
- Shakalaka Baby (2002)
- Annai Kaligambal (2003)
- Mannin Maindhan (2005)
