= Waris (1969 film) =

- Theatrical release poster
- Directed by: T. R. Ramanna
- Written by: Rajendra Krishan (dialogues)
- Story by: T. N. Balu
- Based on: Naan (1967) by T. R. Ramanna
- Produced by: Vasu Menon
- Starring: Jeetendra; Hema Malini; Prem Chopra; Mehmood; Aruna Irani
- Cinematography: M. A. Rahman
- Edited by: M. S. Mani
- Music by: R. D. Burman
- Production company: Vasu Studios
- Release date: 26 September 1969
- Running time: 158 minutes
- Country: India
- Language: Hindi

Waris (transl. Heir) is a 1969 Indian Hindi-language film, produced by Vasu Menon and directed by Ramanna. The film stars Jeetendra, Hema Malini with music composed by R. D. Burman. It is a remake of the Tamil film Naan (1967).

== Cast ==
- Jeetendra as Ravi/Ram Kumar #2
- Hema Malini as Geeta
- Neetu Singh as Baby Sonia
- Master Sachin as Young Ram Kumar
- Prem Chopra as Murthy/Ram Kumar #1
- Mehmood as CID Inspector Rajan/Ram Kumar #3/ Rajan's mother
- Aruna Irani
- Kamini Kaushal as Rukmani
- Shylashri
- Nazima as Komal
- Sudesh Kumar as Original Ram Kumar
- David as Diwanji
- S.A. Ashokan as Samson

== Reception ==
The film was well received by the audience.

Mehmood and Aruna Irani had made a successful comedy team in Aulad (1968), produced a year earlier. Their next pairing was Waris and the audience's appreciation helped in their working together in several films. Mehmood won the Filmfare Award for Best Performance in a Comic Role for this movie.

== Soundtrack ==
Waris

Soundtrack album by R.D. Burman
- Released: January 1, 1969
- Genre: Feature film soundtrack
- Length: 31:19
- Label: Saregama India
- Producer: R.D. Burman

R.D. Burman chronology
Pyar Ka Mausam (1969)	Waris (1969)	Saas Bhi Kabhi Bahu Thi (1970)

The film's score was composed by Rahul Dev Burman and lyrics were penned by Rajendra Krishan. It had playback by Lata Mangeshkar, Asha Bhosle and Mohammed Rafi. A popular number was the parody song, "Chahe Koi Mujhe Bhoot Kaho" where Burman mixed a medley of numbers from different films like Junglee (1961), Brahmachari (1968) and An Evening In Paris (1967). All Shanker JaikIshen compositions.

Songs
No.	Title	Singer(s)	Length
1.	"Waris Theme (Instrumental)"	R.D. Burman	1:40
2.	"Chahe Koi Mujhe Bhoot Kaho"	Asha Bhosle & Mohammed Rafi	4:35
3.	"Lehra Ke Aaya Hai Jhoka Bahar Ka"	Lata Mangeshkar & Mohammed Rafi	4:21
4.	"Kabhi Kabhi Aisa Bhi Hota Hai"	Lata Mangeshkar & Mohammed Rafi	3:30
5.	"Dil Ki Lagi Ko Chhupaoon Kaise"	Lata Mangeshkar	3:13
6.	"Ek Bechara Pyar Ka Mara"	Mohammed Rafi	3:37
7.	"Kaun Hai Woh Kaun"	Asha Bhosle & Manna Dey	5:42
Total length:			31:19
