= Olimayamana Ethirkalam =

- Poster
- Directed by: K. Krishnamoorthy
- Screenplay by: K. Krishnamoorthy
- Story by: V. C. Guhanathan
- Produced by: K. Krishnamoorthy
- Starring: Vijayakumar; Sowcar Janaki; Sripriya
- Cinematography: A. Somasundaram
- Edited by: B. S. Mani
- Music by: Vijaya Bhaskar
- Production company: Chitra Mahal
- Release date: 9 April 1977
- Country: India
- Language: Tamil

Olimayamana Ethirkalam (transl. Bright future) is a 1977 Indian Tamil-language film produced and directed by K. Krishnamoorthy, and co-written by V. C. Guhanathan. The film stars Vijayakumar, Sowcar Janaki and Sripriya. It was released on 9 April 1977.

== Cast ==
- Vijayakumar
- Thengai Srinivasan as Venkatraman
- Sowcar Janaki as Lakshmi
- Sripriya
- Suruli Rajan as a stage actor
- Manorama
- Ashokan as a retired Major
- S. A. Chandrasekhar

== Production ==
Besides directing and producing the film, Krishnamoorthy also wrote the screenplay whole Guhanathan, who wrote the film's story, also wrote the dialogues. Cinematography was handled by A. Somasundaram and editing by B. S. Mani.

== Soundtrack ==
The music was composed by Vijaya Bhaskar, with lyrics by Kannadasan.

Track listing
No.	Title	Singer(s)	Length
1.	"Mamadurai Naattinil"	S. P. Balasubrahmanyam, Vani Jairam
2.	"Dasaratha Rajakumara"	Thangappan
3.	"Kudumbathin Thalaivi"	Vani Jairam
4.	"Vaishnava Janatho"	Vani Jairam

== Release and reception ==
Olimayamana Ethirkalam was released on 9 April 1977. Kanthan of Kalki felt Vijayakumar was underutilised, and though the film's title is nice the film itself is average.
