= Aaru Pushpangal =

- Theatrical release poster
- Directed by: K. M. Balakrishnan
- Produced by: S. N. S. Thirumal
- Starring: Rajinikanth; Vijayakumar; Y. Vijaya; Srividya
- Cinematography: P. Bhaskarrao
- Edited by: R. Vittal
- Music by: M. S. Viswanathan
- Production company: Ashtalakshmi Pictures
- Release date: 10 November 1977
- Running time: 125 minutes
- Country: India
- Language: Tamil

Aaru Pushpangal (transl. Six Flowers) is a 1977 Indian Tamil-language film directed by K. M. Balakrishnan. It stars Rajinikanth, Vijayakumar and Srividya, with Y. Vijaya, Pandari Bai, S. V. Sahasranamam, Suruli Rajan and Manorama in supporting roles. It was released on 10 November 1977.

== Cast ==
- Rajinikanth as Ravi
- Y. Vijaya as Kumutha
- Srividya as Mallika
- Vijayakumar as Raja
- Suruli Rajan as Kanthasamy
- V. K. Ramasamy as Bangarusamy
- Manorama as Meera (Guest appearance)
- Pandari Bai as Malliga and Kumutha's mother

== Production ==
Aaru Pushpangal is the first film where Rajinikanth and Vijayakumar acted together. The filming was held at Perungalathur.

== Soundtrack ==
The soundtrack was composed by M. S. Viswanathan, with lyrics by Kannadasan. "Yendi Muthamma" is the debut of Chandrabose as a singer.

Song	Singer	Length
"Yendi Muthamma"	Chandrabose	4:14
"Alagar Malayil"	L. R. Eswari	5:24
"Vaazhvarasi Thaaye"	T. M. Soundararajan, L. R. Eswari	4:46
"Atha Maga"	L. R. Eswari, B. S. Sasirekha, L. R. Anjali	4:38

== Bibliography ==
- Ramachandran, Naman (2014) [2012]. Rajinikanth: The Definitive Biography. Penguin Books. ISBN 978-0-14-342111-5.
