= T. N. Balu =

Indian writer, director and producer

- Born: Madras Presidency, British India
- Died: 1981; Madras, Tamil Nadu, India
- Occupations: Writer, director, producer

T. N. Balu (died 1981) was an Indian writer, director and producer who worked in Tamil cinema. He was active in the second half of the 1900s, and shared a close association with the former chief ministers of Tamil Nadu Karunanidhi.

== Film career ==
Balu worked as a writer on several notable Tamil films in the 1960s including Deiva Thai (1964), Athey Kangal (1967) and Moondrezhuthu (1968). His work as the storywriter of Naan (1967), saw him also credited for the films Telugu and Hindi remakes, Nenante Nene (1968) and Waris (1969). He regularly collaborated as a story, screenplay and dialogue writer for productions by Modern Theatres.

In the late 1970s, he regularly worked on the scripts for Jaishankar's films and directed both Nallathukku Kalamillai (1977) and Odi Vilayadu Thatha (1977). Balu's Sattam En Kaiyil (1978) featuring Kamal Haasan and Sripriya was a commercially successful venture. Balu was jailed soon after the film's release, and Kamal Haasan helped bail him out, after seeking permission from chief minister M. G. Ramachandran, to attend the 100th day celebration ceremony of the film. However, soon after the ceremony was over, with the help of his acquaintances from the opposition party - Dravida Munnetra Kazhagam, Balu managed to escape to Bangalore. The incident created a strain between M. G. Ramachandran and Kamal Haasan. He died during the making of his production venture, Sankarlal (1981), which he was also directing and writing. The film was later completed by cinematographer N. K. Viswanathan with the assistance of Kamal Haasan.

== Personal life ==
Balu's son, T. N. B. Kathiravan, also known as Kathir, is a dubbing artiste who works on Tamil language films. He has provided voiceovers for actors including Vidyut Jammwal, Ashish Vidyarthi and Sharath Lohithaswa in Tamil cinema.

== Death ==
Balu died during the making of his production venture, Sankarlal (1981).

== Partial filmography ==
Year	Film	Credited as			Notes
Year	Film	Director	Writer	Producer	Notes
1964	Deiva Thai	✗	✓	✗	
1965	Aasai Mugam	✗	✓	✗	
1965	Iravum Pagalum	✗	✓	✗	
1967	Naan	✗	✓	✗	
1967	Athey Kangal	✗	✓	✗	
1967	Uyir Mel Aasai	✗	✓	✗	
1968	Kadhal Vaaganam	✗	✓	✗	
1968	Moondrezhuthu	✗	✓	✗	
1969	Manasaatchi	✓	✓	✗	
1969	Anjal Petti 520	✓	✓	✗	
1971	Meendum Vazhven	✓	✓	✗	
1972	Bullet Bullodu	✓	✓	✗	Telugu film
1973	Pookkari	✗	✓	✗	
1973	Maru Piravi	✗	✓	✗	
1974	Vairam	✗	✓	✗	
1977	Andru Sindhiya Raththam	✗	✓	✗	
1977	Nallathukku Kalamillai	✓	✓	✗	
1977	Odi Vilayadu Thatha	✓	✓	✗	
1977	Uyarnthavargal	✓	✓	✗	
1978	Sattam En Kaiyil	✓	✓	✓	
1981	Sankarlal	✓	✓	✓	
