= Madhurageetham =

- Poster
- Directed by: V. C. Guhanathan
- Written by: V. C. Guhanathan
- Produced by: D. Rammohan Rao
- Starring: Vijayakumar; Srividya; Sripriya
- Cinematography: A. Somasundaram
- Edited by: Bhaskaran
- Music by: Chandrabose
- Production company: Sri Venkatalakshmi Productions
- Release date: 17 June 1977
- Country: India
- Language: Tamil

Madhurageetham is a 1977 Indian Tamil-language film written and directed by V. C. Guhanathan. The film stars Vijayakumar, Srividya and Sripriya, with S. A. Ashokan, Major Sundarrajan, V. Gopalakrishnan, Suruli Rajan, ISR and Sachu in supporting roles. It was released on 17 June 1977 and won four Tamil Nadu State Film Awards including Second Best Film, Best Actress Special Prize (Srividya) and Best Story Writer (Guhanathan).

== Cast ==
- Vijayakumar
- Srividya
- Sripriya
- S. A. Ashokan
- Major Sundarrajan
- V. Gopalakrishnan
- Suruli Rajan
- ISR
- Sachu
- Baby Babitha
- Jayapriya
- Sumathi

== Production ==
When Guhanathan signed on Srividya as the lead actress, he was certain she would win a best actress award and vowed to quit the film industry if she did not win. He claimed to have completed the entire film in 19 days.

== Soundtrack ==
The music was composed by Chandrabose, in his debut. It was initially meant to be the debut of Deva, who then ran a musical troupe with Chandrabose called the Boses Deva troupe.

Track listing
| No. | Title | Lyrics | Singer(s) | Length |
|---|---|---|---|---|
| 1. | "Sugamaana Raagam" | Kannadasan | T. M. Soundararajan, Sirkazhi Govindarajan |
| 2. | "Varungal Aasaigale" | Kannadasan | T. M. Soundararajan |
| 3. | "Kannan Enge" | Poovai Senguttavan | S. P. Balasubrahmanyam, P. Susheela |
| 4. | "Kaindha Sinaiyum" | Kannadasan | T. M. Soundararajan |

== Release and reception ==
Madhurageetham was released on 17 June 1977. It won the Tamil Nadu State Film Awards for Second Best Film, Best Actress Special Prize (Srividya), Best Story Writer (Guhanathan) and Best Cinematographer – Black and White (Somasundaram).
