= Elumalai =

- Panchayat town
- Location in Tamil Nadu, India
- Coordinates: 9.87°N 77.7°E
- Country: India
- State: Tamil Nadu
- District: Madurai

Area
  - Total: 18.31 km^{2} (7.07 sq mi)

Population (2011)
  - Total: 15,746
  - Density: 860.0/km^{2} (2,227/sq mi)

Languages
  - Official: Tamil
- Time zone: UTC+5:30 (IST)

Elumalai is a panchayat town in Peraiyur taluk of Madurai district in the Indian state of Tamil Nadu. It is one of the nine panchayat towns in the district. Spread across an area of 18.31 km^{2} (7.07 sq mi), it had a population of 15,746 individuals as per the 2011 census.

== Geography and administration ==
Elumalai is located in Peraiyur taluk of Madurai district in the Indian state of Tamil Nadu. It is one of the nine panchayat towns in the district. Spread across an area of 18.31 km^{2} (7.07 sq mi), it was established in 1984. The town panchayat is sub-divided into 18 wards. It is headed by a chairperson, who is elected by the members, who are chosen through direct elections. The town forms part of the Usilampatti Assembly constituency that elects its member to the Tamil Nadu legislative assembly and the Theni Lok Sabha constituency that elects its member to the Parliament of India.

== Demographics ==
As per the 2011 census, Elumalai had a population of 15,746 individuals across 4,224 households. The population saw a marginal increase compared to the previous census in 2001 when 14,130 inhabitants were registered. The population consisted of 7,890 males and 7,856 females. About 1,725 individuals were below the age of six years. About 5% of the population belonged to scheduled castes. The entire population is classified as urban. The town has an average literacy rate of 65.1%.

About 42% of the eligible population were employed, of which majority were involved in agriculture and allied activities. Hinduism was the majority religion which was followed by 96.8% of the population, with Christianity (0.3%) and Islam (2.6%) being minor religions.
