= Engalukkum Kalam Varum (1967 film) =

- Theatrical release poster
- Directed by: A. Vincent
- Screenplay by: Pasumani
- Story by: Sombhu Mitra
- Produced by: P V Sathyam-V Nanjundan
- Starring: Nagesh; Padmini
- Cinematography: A. Vincent; Sundaram
- Edited by: G. Venkatraman
- Music by: T. K. Ramamoorthy
- Production companies: Pals & Company
- Distributed by: Santhi Pictures
- Release date: 7 July 1967
- Running time: 177 minutes
- Country: India
- Language: Tamil

Engalukkum Kalam Varum (transl. Our time will come) is a 1967 Indian Tamil-language film directed by A. Vincent, who was also one of the cinematographers. The fim stars Nagesh and Padmini. It was released on 7 July 1967.

== Cast ==
- Nagesh
- Padmini
- T. S. Balaiah
- M. S. Sundari Bai
- Sachu
- Prabhakar

== Production ==
Engalukkum Kalam Varum was directed by A. Vincent, who also handled the cinematography with Sundaram. The film was produced by Sathyan under Pals & Company. The screenplay was written by Pasumani from a story by Sambumithra. Editing was handled by G. Venkatraman. Shooting took place at Bharani Studios. The final length of the film was 4,370 metres (14,340 ft).

== Soundtrack ==
The soundtrack was composed by T. K. Ramamoorthy, with lyrics by Kannadasan and Vaali.

== Release and reception ==
Engalukkum Kalam Varum was released on 7 July 1967, and distributed by Santhi Pictures. The Indian Express wrote, "Sitting through nearly three hours of the film, one can only say, how backward we are even in adapting Bengali stories". Kalki criticised the music, but said the film could be enjoyed for the cast performances.
