= Suruli Rajan =

Indian actor and comedian

- Born: Sankaralingam Ponnaiya Thevar; 14 January 1938; Periyakulam, Theni Distic Tamil Nadu, British India
- Died: 5 December 1980 (aged 42); Chennai, Tamil Nadu, India
- Occupations: Actor, Comedian
- Years active: 1965–1980 (1958-1986 Acting Movies)
- Spouse: Muthulakshmi Rajan
- Children: Shanmugavelan, Kumaravelan, Senthilvelan
- Awards: Tamil Nadu Best Comedian Award

Suruli Rajan (January 14, 1938 - December 5, 1980) was as an Indian actor and comedian who worked primarily in Tamil cinema. In 1981, he was posthumously given the Best Comedian Award by the state Government of Tamil Nadu.

== Early and personal life ==
Rajan was born in 1938 in Periyakulam, situated near Theni in Tamil Nadu, India. His father, Ponnaiya Pillai, worked as an accountant for local farm owners in the surrounding areas of Theni. Rajan was named after the Surulivelar Swamy, the family deity at a temple on top of a hill overlooking Suruli Falls.

Rajan lost both his parents at a young age, forcing him to discontinue his schooling. He moved to his brother's house in Madurai and worked as an apprentice mechanic in a neighbourhood workshop. Seeking fame in acting, he starred in several amateur stage plays in Madurai before moving to Madras in 1959 with the intention of being part of bigger productions.

After a period of scarce opportunities, he worked with various drama troupes, including those of O. A. K. Thevar, Pisir Ramarao, T.N. Balu and in Karunanidhi's 'Kagithapoo' staged in aid of the Dravida Munnetra Kazhagam party's election fund. It was filmmaker Joseph Thaliath Jr. of The Citadel Film Corporation Pvt. Ltd who brought Suruli Rajan to cinema, first in a brief appearance in Iravum Pagalum in 1965 and soon after in a more noticeable comic role in Kathal Paduthum Padu the year following.

His association with T.N. Balu led to notable roles in successful films directed by T.R. Ramanna, such as Naan and Moondrezhuthu. Despite his youth, Suruli Rajan often portrayed older characters in his early movies. Other roles he played during this period include a brief but memorable appearance as a Madras Tamil-speaking character in APN's "Thirumalai Thenkumari" (1970) and the role of a devout fisherman in Aathi Parasakthi (1971). Surulirajan gained popularity in the late '70s due to his distinctive intonation and comedic flair for the absurd.

While occasionally leaning towards suggestive humor, he consistently succeeded in evoking laughter. Suruli's noteworthy portrayal of a miserly rural character in M.A. Khaja's Manthoppu Kiliye (1979) received rare acclaim, securing a distinguished position among the timeless comedic sequences in Tamil cinema. His comedic antics became a ubiquitous presence in many films of that era, earning him a record for appearing in no less than 50 movies in a single year in 1980.

His career was cut short due to his untimely death in 1980 while he was at the peak of his career.

== Filmography ==
Year	Film	Role	Notes
1965	Iravum Pagalum		Debut
1966	Andru Kanda Mugam	Constable	
1966	Kathal Paduthum Padu	Ponnambalam	
1967	Uyir Mel Aasai		
1967	Naan	Sundaralingam	
1968	Moondrezhuthu	Venkateswara Rao	
1968	Thaer Thiruvizha	Boat Passenger	
1968	Delhi Mapillai	Chopra	
1969	Naangu Killadigal	Baba	
1969	Anjal Petti 520	Ramanujam	
1969	Thulabharam	Modi Masthan	
1970	Thirumalai Thenkumari	Mannaru	
1971	Kankatchi		
1971	Veettukku Oru Pillai	Ayyakannu	
1972	Kurathi Magan		
1973	Thirumalai Deivam	Rangen	
1973	Rajapart Rangadurai	Konangi/Konangipatti	
1973	Rajaraja Cholan	Palace Servant	
1974	Anbu Thangai		
1974	Thangappathakkam	Soodamani	
1975	Aayirathil Oruthi	Sivakolunthu	
1975	Anbe Aaruyire	Servant	
1976	Akka		
1976	Badrakali		
1976	Inspector Manaivi		
1976	Janaki Sabatham		
1976	Kumara Vijayam		
1976	Madhana Maaligai		
1976	Mayor Meenakshi		
1976	Mittai Mummi		
1976	Nee Indri Naan Illai		
1976	Ore Thanthai		
1976	Rojavin Raja		
1976	Thunive Thunai		
1976	Ungalil Oruthi		
1976	Uravaadum Nenjam		
1976	Vazhvu En Pakkam		
1977	Aattukara Alamelu		
1977	Annan Oru Koyil	Police Constable	
1977	Deepam		
1977	Durga Devi		
1977	Gasslight Mangamma		
1977	Ilaya Thalaimurai		
1977	Madhura Geetham		
1977	Munnooru Naal		
1977	Nee Vazha Vendum		
1977	Odi Vilayadu Thatha		
1977	Olimayamana Ethirkalam		
1977	Oruvanukku Oruthi		
1977	Palabhishekam		
1977	Bhuvana Oru Kelvi Kuri		
1977	Perumaikuriyaval		
1977	Raasi Nalla Raasi		
1977	Sonnathai Seiven		
1977	Sonthamadi Nee Enakku		
1977	Thoondil Meen		
1977	Aarupushpangal	Kanthasamy	
1978	Aayiram Jenmangal		
1978	Shankar Salim Simon	Kabali	
1978	Aghni Pravesam		
1978	Anna Lakshmi		
1978	Athaivida Rahasiyam		
1978	Aval Thantha Uravu		
1978	Bairavi		
1978	Chittu Kuruvi		
1978	Ival Oru Seethai		
1978	Kannamoochi		
1978	Kannan Oru Kai Kuzhandai		
1978	Karate Kamala		
1978	Machanai Patheengala		
1978	Makkal Kural		
1978	Manitharil Ithanai Nirangala		
1978	Meenatshi Kunkumam		
1978	Oru Veedu Oru Ulagam		
1978	Panchamurtham		
1978	Pavathin Sambalam		
1978	Rajavukku Etha Rani		
1978	Rudra Thandavam		
1978	Sakka Podu Podu Raja		
1978	Sonnadhu Needhana		
1978	Taxi Driver		
1978	Thai Meethu Sathiyam		
1978	Thirukkalyanam		
1978	Thirupura Sundari		
1978	Unakkum Vaazhvu Varum		
1978	En Kelvikku Enna Bathil		
1978	Ennai Pol Oruvan	Usha's Father	
1978	Mela Thalangal		
1979	Annai Oru Alayam	Mannar	
1979	Appothey Sonneyney Keetiya		
1979	Dharma Yuddham		
1979	Ennadi Meenakshi		
1979	Kadavul Amaitha Medai		
1979	Kamasasthiram		
1979	Kizhakkum Merkkum Santhikkindrana		
1979	Lakshmi		
1979	Manthoppu Kiliye		
1979	Mudal Iravu		
1979	Mugathil Mugam Parkalam		
1979	Naanoru Kai Paarkiren		
1979	Nangooram		
1979	Neechal Kulam		
1979	Needhikkumun Neeya Naana		
1979	Neeya?		
1979	Pasi		
1979	Oru Vidukathai Oru Thodardathai		
1979	Paathai Maarinal		
1979	Pagalil Oru Iravu		
1979	Pancha Bootham		
1979	Poonthalir		
1979	Raja Rajeswari		
1979	Siri Siri Maamaa		
1979	Sithira Chevvanam		
1979	Sri Ramajayam		
1979	Thayillamal Naanillai		
1979	Veettukku Veedu Vasappadi		
1979	Yaarukku Yaar Kaval		
1980	Anbukku Naan Adimai		
1980	Antharangam Oomayanathu		
1980	Azhaitthal Varuven		
1980	Bambai Mail 109		
1980	Deiveega Rahangal		
1980	Doorathu Idi Muzhakkam	Neelakandam	
1980	Edhir Veettu Jannal		
1980	Ellam Un Kairasi		
1980	Enga Vathiyar		
1980	Enga Vathiyar		
1980	Geetha Oru Shenbaga Poo		
1980	Johnny		
1980	Kaadu		
1980	Kaali		
1980	Kadhal Kadhal Kadhal		
1980	Kalam Bathil Sollum		
1980	Karadi		
1980	Karumbu Vill		
1980	Kathal Kiligal		
1980	Kumarip Pennin Ulathile		
1980	Kuruvik Koodu		
1980	Malargindra Paruvathile		
1980	Meenakshi		
1980	Megathukkum Thagamundu		
1980	Murattu Kaalai		
1980	Muzhu Nilavu		
1980	Naan Potta Saval		
1980	Neer Nilam Neruppu		
1980	Oli Pirandhadhu		
1980	Ore Mutham		
1980	Oru Marathu Paravaigal		
1980	Panam Penn Pasam		
1980	Paruvathin Vasalile		
1980	Pennukku Yaar Kaaval		
1980	Pollathavan		
1980	Ponnagaram		
1980	Porkalam		
1980	Pudiya Thoranangal		
1980	Rishi Moolam		
1980	Rusi Kanda Poonai		
1980	Samanthipoo		
1980	Saranam Iyyappa		
1980	Thani Maram		
1980	Theru Vilakku		
1980	Ullasa Paravaigal		
1980	Valli Mayil		
1980	Vandichakkaram		
1980	Veli Thandiya Velladu		
1981	Meendum Kokila	Film Director	
1981	Aadugal Nanaigindrana		
1981	Anichamalar		
1981	Kadavulin Theerpu		
1981	Engamma Maharani		
1981	Kannadi		
1981	Kanni Mahamayi		
1981	Kazhugu		
1981	Lorry Driver Rajakkannu		
1981	Sathya Sundharam		
1981	Oru Iravu Oru Paarvai		
1981	Pennin Vaazhkkai		
1981	Pennmanam Pesugirathu		
1981	Ram Lakshman		
1981	Sankarlal		
1981	Satya Sundaram		
1981	Vadagai Veedu		
1981	Vasanthakalam		
1982	Aval Yetriya Dheebangal		
1982	Hitler Umanath		
1982	Iniyavale Vaa		
1982	Irattai Manithan		
1982	Muraiponnu		
1982	Nayakarin Magal		
1982	Nirandharam		
1982	Oorukku Oru Pillai		
1982	Pannaiburathu Pandavargal		
1982	Sangili		
1983	Avaloru Kaviyam		
1983	Kashmir Kadhali		
1983	Oppandham		
1983	Samsaram Enbathu Veenai		
1984	Pillayar		
1984	Erattai Manithan		
1984	Idhey Naa Savaal		
1985	Yemaatrathe Yemaaraathe		
