= List of Tamil films of 1975 =

Post-amendment to the Tamil Nadu Entertainments Tax Act 1939 on 1 April 1958, Gross jumped to 140 per cent of Nett Commercial Taxes Department disclosed ₹18.59 crore in entertainment tax revenue for the year.

The following is a list of films produced in the Tamil film industry in India in 1975, in alphabetical order.

== 1975 ==
Title	Director	Production	Music	Cast
Aan Pillai Singam	S. P. Muthuraman	Arun Chandra Movies	Vijaya Bhaskar	Sivakumar, M. N. Rajam, Sujatha, Sripriya, Vijayakumar, Cho
Aayirathil Oruthi	Avinashi Mani	K. R. G. Pictures	V. Kumar	K. R. Vijaya, K. Balaji, Srikanth, Kamal Haasan, Sujatha, Jayasudha, Thengai Srinivasan, Manorama
Amudha	K. Venkatraman	Sri Poongavanathal Pictures	M. S. Viswanathan	Ravichandran, R. Muthuraman, C. R. Vijayakumari, Rajasree, Nagesh, Major Sundarrajan
Anaiya Vilakku	Krishnan–Panju	Anjugam Pictures	M. S. Viswanathan	M. K. Muthu, Srikanth, Padmapriya, M. R. R. Vasu, Asogan
Anbe Aaruyire	A. C. Tirulokchandar	Amutham Pictures	M. S. Viswanathan	Sivaji Ganesan, Manjula, Nagesh, K. A. Thangavelu, Manorama, Suruli Rajan
Anbu Roja	Devaraj–Mohan	Sulochana Pictures	Shankar–Ganesh	R. Muthuraman, Latha, Thengai Srinivasan
Andharangam	V. Srinivasan	Maya Arts	G. Devarajan	Kamal Haasan, Deepa, Major Sundarrajan, Savitri, Cho, Thengai Srinivasan, Manorama, Sukumari, Kumari Padmini
Apoorva Raagangal	K. Balachander	Kalakendra Movies	M. S. Viswanathan	Kamal Haasan, Major Sundarrajan, Srividya, Jayasudha, Nagesh, Rajinikanth
Avalukku Aayiram Kangal	T. R. Ramanna	A. B. Creations	T. K. Ramamoorthy	Jayalalitha, Jaishankar, Ravichandran, Cho, M. R. R. Vasu
Avandhan Manidhan	A. C. Tirulokchandar	Rasi Enterprises	M. S. Viswanathan	Sivaji Ganesan, Jayalalitha, Manjula, R. Muthuraman, Cho, Sachu
Cinema Paithiyam	V. Srinivasan	A. L. S. Productions	Shankar–Ganesh	Jayachitra, Jaishankar, Sowcar Janaki, Major Sundarrajan, Kamal Haasan, P. R. Varalakshmi, Cho, Sachu
Dr. Siva	A. C. Tirulokchandar	Cine Bharath Productions	M. S. Viswanathan	Sivaji Ganesan, Manjula, Major Sundarrajan, Nagesh, Manorama
Eduppar Kai Pillai	K. Vijayan	Sakthi Cine Arts	M. B. Sreenivasan	Jaishankar, P. Bhanumathi, Vennira Aadai Nirmala, Kumari Manjula, Major Sundarrajan, Srikanth, Shubha
Ellorum Nallavare	S. S. Balan	Gemini Pictures	V. Kumar	R. Muthuraman, Manjula, Jayanthi
Enakkoru Magan Pirappan	M. Krishnan	Sri Sakthi Combines	A. M. Rajah	A. V. M. Rajan, Shubha, Vidhubala, M. R. R. Vasu
Enga Pattan Sothu	M. Karnan	Vijaya Chithra Films	Shankar–Ganesh	Jaishankar, Sivakumar, Rajakokila, A. Sakunthala, Thengai Srinivasan
Engalukkum Kadhal Varum	R. Vittal	Vijayalakshmi Cine Arts	M. S. Viswanathan	Ravichandran, Kanchana, Nagesh, Padmapriya
Ezhaikkum Kaalam Varum	S. Rajendra Babu	Saradha Combines	V. Kumar	R. Muthuraman, Srikanth, Shubha, Fatafat Jayalaxmi
Hotel Sorgam	G. Ramakrishnan	Sudha Movies	S. M. Subbaiah Naidu	Jaishankar, Kumari Padmini, Vijaya Lalitha, Thengai Srinivasan, Major Sundarrajan, Pandari Bai, M. R. R. Vasu
Idhayakkani	A. Jagannathan	Sathya Movies	M. S. Viswanathan	M. G. Ramachandran, Radha Saluja, Vennira Aadai Nirmala, Thengai Srinivasan
Ingeyum Manidhargal	A. L. Narayanan	Pacha Nayaki Films	T. S. Nadesh	M. K. Muthu, Vennira Aadai Nirmala, Srikanth
Ippadiyum Oru Penn	P. Bhanumathi	Bharani Pictures	P. Bhanumathi	P. Bhanumathi, Sivakumar, Kumari Padmini, Devika, Thengai Srinivasan, Manorama
Kadhavai Thattiya Mohini Paey	Rajaram	Anuradha International Films	C. N. Pandurangan	
Karotti Kannan	R. Pattu	Ajantha Enterprises	V. Kumar	Thengai Srinivasan, Padmapriya, Srikanth, Sripriya, V. K. Ramaswamy
Kasthuri Vijayam	P. Madhavan	Devanayaki Films	V. Kumar	R. Muthuraman, K. R. Vijaya, Nagesh, Srikanth, Vidhubala, Pakoda Kadhar
Maalai Sooda Vaa	C. V. Rajendran	Babu Movies	Vijaya Bhaskar	Kamal Haasan, 'Kumari' Manjula, Major Sundarrajan
Mamiyar Vijayam	Madurai Thirumaran		M. S. Viswanathan	
Manidhanum Dheivamagalam	P. Madhavan	Vijayavel Films	Kunnakudi Vaidyanathan	Sivaji Ganesan, Sowcar Janaki, Ushanandini
Manjal Mugame Varuga	V. C. Guhanathan	Glamour International	M. S. Viswanathan	Vijayakumar, Sathyapriya, Jaya Guhanathan, Master Sekhar
Mannavan Vanthaanadi	P. Madhavan	Jayaar Movies	M. S. Viswanathan	Sivaji Ganesan, Manjula, Jayasudha, Nagesh
Mayangukiral Oru Maadhu	S. P. Muthuraman	Vijaya Bhaskar Films	Vijaya Bhaskar	R. Muthuraman, Sujatha, Vijayakumar, Fatafat Jayalaxmi, Thengai Srinivasan
Melnaattu Marumagal	A. P. Nagarajan	C. N. V. Productions	Kunnakudi Vaidyanathan	Sivakumar, Kamal Haasan, Laurance Pourtale, Jayasudha, Gandhimathi, Junior Balaiah, Gopala Krishnan
Naalai Namadhe	K. S. Sethumadhavan	Gajendra Films	M. S. Viswanathan	M. G. Ramachandran, Latha, Vennira Aadai Nirmala, Nagesh, Chandra Mohan, M. N. Nambiar
Nalla Marumagal	A. Vincent			Sowcar Janaki
Nambikkai Natchathiram	Thirumalai–Mahalingam	Arivu Sudar Movies	Lakshmi Narayanan	M. K. Muthu, Srividya
Ninaithadhai Mudippavan	P. Neelakantan	Oriental Pictures	M. S. Viswanathan	M. G. Ramachandran, Manjula, Latha, Sharada
Oru Kudumbathin Kadhai	Durai	Sulochana Pictures	Shankar–Ganesh	R. Muthuraman, Nanditha Bose, Sumithra
Pallandu Vaazhga	K. Shankar	Udhayam Productions	K. V. Mahadevan	M. G. Ramachandran, Latha, Thengai Srinivasan
Panam Pathum Seyum	G. Subramaniam	Sri Sathyanarayana Art Films	Shankar–Ganesh	Cho, Rathna
Pattampoochi	A. S. Prakasam	Sri Prakash Productions	P. Sreenivasan	Kamal Haasan, Jayachitra, Nagesh
Pattikkaattu Raja	K. Shanmugam	Ravi Combines	Shankar–Ganesh	Sivakumar, Kamal Haasan, Jayasudha, Sripriya
Paattum Bharathamum	P. Madhavan	Arun Prasad Movies	M. S. Viswanathan	Sivaji Ganesan, Jayalalitha, Vijayakumar, Sripriya
Pinju Manam	A. K. Subramaniam	Manorama Movies	Shankar–Ganesh	Jaishankar, Lakshmi, Jayachitra, Thengai Srinivasan, Jayakumari, Srikanth, T. K. Bagavathi, Suruli Rajan
Piriya Vidai	Srikanth	Prasad Productions	G. K. Venkatesh	R. Muthuraman, Prameela, Nagesh, Murthy, V. K. Ramasamy, Thengai Srinivasan
Puthu Vellam	K. Vijayan	N. V. R. Pictures	M. B. Sreenivasan	Sivakumar, 'Kumari' Manjula, Savitri, R. S. Manohar, Pushpalatha, V. Gopalakrishnan, M. R. R. Vasu
Sondhangal Vazhga	Madurai Thirumaran	V. N. C. Creations	K. V. Mahadevan	Jaishankar, Jayachitra, Vijayakumar, Major Sundarrajan, Cho, Thengai Srinivasan, Manorama, A. Sakunthala, V. K. Ramasamy
Swami Ayyappan	P. Subramaniam	Neela Productions	G. Devarajan	Gemini Ganesan, K. Balaji, A. V. M. Rajan, Lakshmi, Srividya, Rajasree, Sukumari, Master Raghu, Baby Vinodini
Thai Veetu Seedhanam	Madurai Thirumaran	M. S. Kasi Productions	M. S. Viswanathan	K. R. Vijaya, Jaishankar, Ravichandran, Ushanandini, Major Sundarrajan, M. N. Rajam, Vijaya Kumar
Thangathile Vairam	K. Sornam	Sooralaya Productions	Shankar–Ganesh	Sivakumar, Kamal Haasan, Jayachitra, Sripriya
Then Sindhudhe Vaanam	Ra. Sankaran	Sudarsan Enterprises	V. Kumar	Sivakumar, Kamal Haasan, Jayachitra, Rani Chandra
Thennangkeetru	Kovi Manisekaran	Goodwin Enterprises	G. K. Venkatesh	Sujatha, Vijayakumar, Kalpana, Jai Ganesh, Senthamarai
Thiyaga Ullam	R. Pattabiraman		V. Kumar	R. Muthuraman, Padmapriya, Kumari Padmini, Jayakumari
Thirudanukku Thirudan	T. M. Thirumalai	T. R. I. Films		Kannan, Mamatha
Thiruvarul	R. Thyagarajan	Dhandayudhapani Films	Kunnakkudi Vaidhyanathan	A. V. M. Rajan, Jaya Guhanathan, Nagesh, Sukumari, Major Sundarrajan
Thottadhellam Ponnaagum	R. Vittal	Geetha Chithra Productions	Vijaya Bhaskar	Jaishankar, Jayachitra, Sripriya, Thengai Srinivasan, Manorama
Unga Veettu Kalyanam	K. Krishnamurthy	Sri Chitra Mahal Productions	V. Kumar	Thengai Srinivasan, Shubha, Cho, Thangavelu, Manorama, Jyothi Lakshmi
Uravu Solla Oruvan	Devaraj–Mohan	Filmalaya Combines	Vijaya Bhaskar	R. Muthuraman, Sivakumar, Sujatha, Padmapriya, Cho, Senthamarai, S. Varalakshmi
Uravukku Kai Koduppom	K. S. Gopalakrishnan	Chithra Productions	D. B. Ramachandran	Gemini Ganesan, Sowcar Janaki, Nagesh, V. S. Raghavan
Vaira Nenjam	C. V. Sridhar	Chitralaya	M. S. Viswanathan	Sivaji Ganesan, Padmapriya, R. Muthuraman, K. Balaji, A. Sakunthala
Vaazhnthu Kaattugiren	Krishnan–Panju	S. S. K. Films	M. S. Viswanathan	R. Muthuraman, Sujatha, Srikanth, Padmapriya, M. N. Rajam, Manorama, Suruli Rajan
Yarukku Maappillai Yaro	S. P. Muthuraman	Uma Chitra Films	Vijaya Bhaskar	Jaishankar, Jayachitra, Srikanth, Fatafat Jayalaxmi
Yarukkum Vetkam Illai	Cho	Vivek Chithra Productions	G. K. Venkatesh	Jayalalitha, Sivakumar, Cho, Srikanth, Sukumari
