= Bhamidipati =

Bhamidipati (Telugu: భమిడిపాటి) is a Telugu surname, commonly found among Telugu Brahmins.

== Notable People with surname Bhamidipati ==
- Bhamidipati Kameswara Rao was an Indian writer in the Telugu language.
- Bhamidipati Radhakrishna is an Indian playwright and scriptwriter in Telugu cinema.
- B. Sai Praneeth is an Indian badminton player.
- Bhamidipati Nageswara Sarma.భమిడిపాటి నాగేశ్వర శర్మ, శ్రీవత్సస గోత్రం
- Bhamidipati Ramagopalam (1932–2010), popularly known as Bharago, was a humour writer of short stories, critiques and popular novels in Telugu.
