= List of Telugu films of 1975 =

This is a list of Telugu-language films produced in the year 1975.

Title	Director	Cast	Notes
Aadhani Adrustam		Chalam	
Abhimanavathi	Doondi	Krishna, Vanisri	
Ammayila Sapatham	G. V. R. Seshagiri Rao	Ramakrishna, Chandra Mohan, Chandrakala, Lakshmi	
Ammayilu Jagratha	P. Sambasiva Rao	Sujatha, Prabha, Uma Devi	
Andaru Manchivare	S. S. Balan	Sobhan Babu, Manjula	
Annadammula Anubandham	S. D. Lal	N. T. Rama Rao, Latha	
Annadammula Katha		Chandramohan, Chandrakala, Prabha	
Anuragalu	K. S. Rami Reddy	Sridevi, "Master" Natraj, Ravikant	
Babu	K. Raghavendra Rao	Sobhan Babu, Vanisri, Lakshmi	
Balipeetam	Dasari Narayana Rao	Sobhan Babu, Sharada	
Bhagasthulu	A. Bhimsingh	Nagabhushanam, Jayanthi, Chandramohan, Jayasudha	
Bharatamlo Oka Ammayi	Dasari Narayana Rao	Murali Mohan, Jayachitra	
Bharathi	Veeturi	Krishnam Raju, S. V. Ranga Rao, Jamuna, Latha	
Bullemma Sapatham			
Chaduvu Samskaram	Rajshri	Kaikala Satyanarayana, Gummadi	
Challani Thalli	K. S. Rami Reddy	Anjali Devi, S. V. Ranga Rao, Kantha Rao, Jayanthi	
Cheekati Velugulu	K. S. Prakash Rao	Krishna, Vanisri, Padmapriya	
Chinninati Kalalu	K. Viswanath	Krishnam Raju, Jayanthi	
Chittamma Chilakamma			
Cinema Vaibhavam	P. Chandra Sekhar Reddy	Gummadi, Savitri, Chandramohan, Jamuna	
Devude Digivaste	Dasari Narayana Rao	Ramakrishna, Jaya Prada	
Devudu Chesina Pelli	T. Rama Rao	Sobhan Babu, Sharada	
Devudulanti Manishi	C. S. Rao	Krishna, Manjula	
Eduruleni Manishi	K. Bapayya	N. T. Rama Rao, Vanisri	
Ee Kalam Dampathulu	D. Yoganand	Jamuna	
Gajula Kishtayya	Adurthi Subba Rao	Krishna, Zarina Wahab	
Gunavanthudu	Adurthi Subba Rao	Sobhan Babu, Manjula	
Jebu Donga	V. Madhusudhana Rao	Sobhan Babu, Manjula	
Jeevana Jyothi	K. Viswanath	Sobhan Babu, Vanisri	
Kathanayakuni Katha	D. Yoganand	N. T. Rama Rao, Vanisri	
Kothakapuram	P. Chandra Sekhar Reddy	Krishna, Bharathi	
Lakshmana Rekha	N. Gopala Krishna	Murali Mohan, Chandramohan, Jayasudha	
Maa Inti Devudu	B. V. Prasad	Vijaya Lalitha, Phani	
Maa Voori Ganga	K. S. R. Das	Lakshmi	
Mallela Manasulu	K. V. Nandana Rao	S. V. Ranga Rao, Anjali Devi, Haranath, Vijaya Nirmala	
Maya Maschindra	B. Mistri	N. T. Rama Rao, Vanisri	
Moguda? Pellama?	B. A. Subba Rao	Krishnam Raju, Jamuna, Roja Ramani, Narasimha Raju, Gummadi	
Mutyala Muggu	Bapu	Sreedhar, Sangeeta	
Naaku Swatantram Vachindi	Lakshmi Deepak	Krishnam Raju, Gummadi, Sowkar Janaki, Jaya Prada	
Pandati Samsaram	P. Chandra Sekhar Reddy	Gummadi, Bhanumathi, Raja Babu	
Parivartana	K. Hemambaradara Rao	Krishnam Raju, Chandramohan, Lakshmi, Jamuna	
Pichodi Pelli	K. S. Rami Reddy	Raja Babu, Vijaya Nirmala	
Pooja	Murugan Kumaran	G. Ramakrishna, Vanisri, Manjula, Savitri, Kanta Rao	
Puttinti Gowravam	P. Chandra Sekhar Reddy	Krishnam Raju, Bharathi	
Raktha Sambandham	M. Mallikarjuna Rao	Krishna, Manjula	
Ramayya Thandri	B. V. Prasad	Jayanthi, Ranganath, Prabha	
Ramuni Minchina Ramudu	M. S. Gopinath	N. T. Rama Rao, Vanisri	
Samsaram	T. Prakash Rao	N. T. Rama Rao, Jamuna	
Santhanam Soubhagyam	D. S. Prakash Rao	Krishna, Vijaya Nirmala	
Soubhagyavathi	P. Chandra Sekhar Reddy	Krishna, Sharada	
Sri Chamundeswari Mahima	Addala Narayana Rao	B. Saroja Devi, Latha	
Sri Ramanjaneya Yuddham	Bapu	N. T. Rama Rao, B. Saroja Devi, Jayanthi, Rajasree	
Swargam Narakam	Dasari Narayana Rao	Annapoorna, Dasari Narayana Rao, Mohan Babu	
Teerpu	U. Viswesvar Rao	N. T. Rama Rao, Savitri	
Thota Ramudu	B. V. Prasad	Chalam, Manjula	
Vaikuntapali	K. Bapayya	Chandramohan, Ranganath, Sharada	
Vayasochina Pilla	Lakshmi Deepak	Murali Mohan, Lakshmi	
Yashoda Krishna	C. S. Rao	S. V. Ranga Rao, Jamuna, Baby Sridevi	
Zamindarugari Ammayi	Singeetham Srinivasa Rao	Ranganath, Sharada	
