= Thangavelu =

Thangavelu is a given name and surname. Notable people with the name include:

- K. A. Thangavelu (1917–1994), Tamil film comedian
- S. Thangavelu (born 1954), Indian politician and the current Member of Parliament in the Raiya Sabha
- Thangavelu Asokan, Indian engineer
- Mariyappan Thangavelu (born 1995), Indian Paralympic high jumper

== See also ==
- Thangavel
