= 1975 in film =

The year 1975 in film involved some significant events, most notably the release of Steven Spielberg's Jaws, as well as the releases of two highly acclaimed films, One Flew Over the Cuckoo's Nest and Monty Python and the Holy Grail. The 20th Century-Fox company celebrated its 40th anniversary.

== Events ==
- January: The government of India sets up the National Film Development Company with an objective of planning, promoting and organizing an integrated and efficient development of the Indian Film Industry.
- March 26: The film version of The Who's Tommy premieres in London.
- May 26: In order to create the necessary special effects for his film, Star Wars, George Lucas forms Industrial Light and Magic.
- June 20: Jaws is released and becomes the highest-grossing movie of the year and the first movie to earn $100 million in US and Canadian theatrical rentals, setting the standard for future blockbusters.
- August 14: The cult classic film The Rocky Horror Picture Show premieres in London.
- August 15: Sholay, directed by Ramesh Sippy, produced by his father G. P. Sippy, and written by Salim–Javed, is released in Bombay. The film stars Dharmendra, Sanjeev Kumar, Hema Malini, Amitabh Bachchan, Jaya Bachchan, and Amjad Khan. When first released, Sholay receives negative critical reviews and a tepid commercial response, but favourable word-of-mouth publicity helps it to become a box office success. It breaks records for continuous showings in many theatres across India. It is the highest-grossing Indian film ever at this time, and is the highest-grossing film in India up until Hum Aapke Hain Koun..! (1994). By numerous accounts, Sholay remains one of the highest-grossing Indian films of all time, adjusted for inflation. Sholay is often regarded as one of the greatest and most influential Indian films of all time.
- November 2: Italian director Pier Paolo Pasolini is brutally murdered in Ostia (Rome), apparently for political reasons.
- November 23: Sneak Previews, the first American film review show, premieres and launches the careers of critics Gene Siskel and Roger Ebert. They remained as a team, and a staple among film critics, through various programs for the next twenty-four years.
- December: Warner Bros. reorganizes following John Calley's decision to step down as president-COO. Frank Wells returns as president and shares CEO duties with Ted Ashley, who also returns as chairman.
- December 23: Bernard Herrmann completes recording his film soundtrack for Taxi Driver, dying the following day.

== Highest-grossing films ==
=== North America ===
The top ten 1975 released films by box office gross in North America are as follows:

† Indicates films currently in theatrical release in the week commencing 13 November 2026.

Highest-grossing films of 1975
Rank	Title	Distributor	Domestic rentals
1	Jaws	Universal	$133,400,000
2	One Flew Over the Cuckoo's Nest	United Artists	$59,200,000
3	The Rocky Horror Picture Show †	20th Century Fox	$50,420,000 (Note: Due to The Rocky Horror Picture Show's unusually long theatrical run, this figure may not accurately reflect its 1975 gross.)
4	Shampoo	Columbia	$23,822,000
5	Dog Day Afternoon	Warner Bros.	$22,500,000
6	The Return of the Pink Panther	United Artists	$20,017,000
7	Three Days of the Condor	Paramount	$20,014,000
8	Funny Lady	Columbia	$19,313,000
9	The Other Side of the Mountain	Universal	$18,012,000
10	Tommy	Columbia	$17,793,000

=== International ===
The highest-grossing 1975 films in countries outside of North America.

International market	Film	Admissions	Revenue		Production country	Ref
International market	Film	Admissions	Local currency	US$	Production country	Ref
Brazil	The Towering Inferno	10,377,230	Unknown	Unknown	United States	
France	The Towering Inferno	4,466,376	Unknown	Unknown	United States	
West Germany	Jaws	7,000,000	Unknown	Unknown	United States	
India	Sholay	150,000,000+	₹350,000,000	$41,790,000	India	(Note: Sholay in India: ₹350 million at Indian box office, 8.3759 Indian rupees per US dollar in 1975)
Italy	My Friends	10,467,254	Unknown	Unknown	Italy	
Japan	The Towering Inferno	Unknown	¥3,640,000,000	Unknown	United States	
Soviet Union	Bobby	62,600,000	15,650,000 Rbls	$21,440,000	India	(Note: Bobby in the Soviet Union: 15.65 million Rbls (Note: 62.6 million tickets sold, average ticket price of 25 kopecks) (US$21.44 million, (Note: 0.73 Rbl per US dollar in 1975) ₹19.24 crore) (Note: 8.973 Indian rupees per US dollar in 1975) in 1975)
Spain	Jaws	5,918,754	Unknown	Unknown	United States	
United Kingdom	Jaws	16,200,000	£11,800,000	$26,000,000	United States	
United States & Canada	Jaws	128,078,800	$260,000,000	$260,000,000	United States	

== Worldwide gross ==
The following table lists known worldwide gross figures for several high-grossing films that originally released in 1975. Note that this list is incomplete and is therefore not representative of the highest-grossing films worldwide in 1975. This list also includes gross revenue from later re-releases.

Title	Admissions (est.)	Revenue	Country
Jaws	242,800,000	$470,653,000	United States
One Flew Over the Cuckoo's Nest	78,706,404 (Note: One Flew Over the Cuckoo's Nest box office admissions: United States and Canada – 53,685,400; United Kingdom – 9.65 million; France, Germany – 10,374,879; Spain, Denmark – 4,996,125)	Unknown	United States
The Rocky Horror Picture Show	58,431,570 (Note: The Rocky Horror Picture Show box office admissions: North America – 55,069,400; France, Germany – 3,362,170)	$166,000,000 (Note: The Rocky Horror Picture Show gross revenue: North America – $139,876,417; International to 1990 – $24,324,290; International since 2007 – $2,628,789; United Kingdom – £600,000 ($916,667) included above)	United Kingdom; United States
Sholay	250,000,000	$70,000,000 (Note: Sholay estimated gross revenue – ₹540 million ($65.08 million): India (1975 release) – ₹350 million ($41.79 million); Soviet Union (1979 release) – $28.2 million (Note: See List of highest-grossing films in the Soviet Union § Highest-grossing foreign films.))	India
Dog Day Afternoon	24,861,525 (Note: Dog Day Afternoon box office admissions: North America – 24,390,200; France – 471,325)	Unknown	United States

== Awards ==
=== Awards ceremonies ===
- Academy Awards - March 29, 1976 (ABC)
- BAFTA Awards - March 17, 1976
- Golden Globe Awards - January 24, 1976
- Palme d'Or (Cannes Film Festival) 13 to 28 May 1976: Chronicle of the Years of Fire (Chronique des années de braise)
- Golden Bear (Berlin Film Festival) 25 June to 6 July 1976: Adoption (Örökbefogadás)

=== Notable awards ===
Category/Organization	Golden Globe Awards January 24, 1976		BAFTA Awards February 29, 1976	Academy Awards March 29, 1976
Category/Organization	Comedy or Musical	Drama	BAFTA Awards February 29, 1976	Academy Awards March 29, 1976
Best Film	The Sunshine Boys	One Flew Over the Cuckoo's Nest	Alice Doesn't Live Here Anymore	One Flew Over the Cuckoo's Nest
Best Director	Miloš Forman; One Flew Over the Cuckoo's Nest		Stanley Kubrick; Barry Lyndon	Miloš Forman; One Flew Over the Cuckoo's Nest
Best Actor	Walter Matthau; The Sunshine Boys	Jack Nicholson; One Flew Over the Cuckoo's Nest	Al Pacino; Dog Day Afternoon / The Godfather Part II	Jack Nicholson; One Flew Over the Cuckoo's Nest
Best Actress	Ann-Margret; Tommy	Louise Fletcher; One Flew Over the Cuckoo's Nest	Ellen Burstyn; Alice Doesn't Live Here Anymore	Louise Fletcher; One Flew Over the Cuckoo's Nest
Best Supporting Actor	Richard Benjamin; The Sunshine Boys		Fred Astaire; The Towering Inferno	George Burns; The Sunshine Boys
Best Supporting Actress	Brenda Vaccaro; Once Is Not Enough		Diane Ladd; Alice Doesn't Live Here Anymore	Lee Grant; Shampoo
Best Screenplay, Adapted	One Flew Over the Cuckoo's Nest; Lawrence Hauben and Bo Goldman		Alice Doesn't Live Here Anymore; Robert Getchell	One Flew Over the Cuckoo's Nest; Lawrence Hauben and Bo Goldman
Best Screenplay, Original	One Flew Over the Cuckoo's Nest; Lawrence Hauben and Bo Goldman		Alice Doesn't Live Here Anymore; Robert Getchell	Dog Day Afternoon; Frank Pierson
Best Original Score	John Williams; Jaws		John Williams; Jaws; The Towering Inferno	John Williams; Jaws; Leonard Rosenman; Barry Lyndon
Best Original Song	"I'm Easy"; Nashville		N/A	"I'm Easy"; Nashville
Best Foreign Language Film	Lies My Father Told Me		N/A	Dersu Uzala

== 1975 films ==
=== By country/region ===
- List of American films of 1975
- List of Argentine films of 1975
- List of Australian films of 1975
- List of Bangladeshi films of 1975
- List of British films of 1975
- List of Canadian films of 1975
- List of French films of 1975
- List of Hong Kong films of 1975
- List of Indian films of 1975
  - List of Hindi films of 1975
  - List of Kannada films of 1975
  - List of Malayalam films of 1975
  - List of Marathi films of 1975
  - List of Tamil films of 1975
  - List of Telugu films of 1975
- List of Japanese films of 1975
- List of Mexican films of 1975
- List of Pakistani films of 1975
- List of South Korean films of 1975
- List of Soviet films of 1975
- List of Spanish films of 1975

=== By genre/medium ===
- List of action films of 1975
- List of animated feature films of 1975
- List of avant-garde films of 1975
- List of comedy films of 1975
- List of drama films of 1975
- List of horror films of 1975
- List of science fiction films of 1975
- List of thriller films of 1975
- List of western films of 1975

== Births ==
- January 1
  - Sonali Bendre, Indian actress
  - Toni Ann Gisondi, American child actress
- January 2: Dax Shepard, American actor
- January 3
  - Jason Marsden, American actor
  - Danica McKellar, American actress
- January 5: Bradley Cooper, American actor and film director
- January 6: Nicole DeHuff, American actress (d. 2005)
- January 9: Patrick Sabongui, Canadian actor and stunt performer
- January 15: Jorge R. Gutierrez, Mexican animator, director, writer and voice actor
- January 16: Julie Ann Emery, American actress
- January 18:
  - Sean Huze, American actor and screenwriter
  - Aleksandra Woźniak, Polish actress
- January 22: Balthazar Getty, American actor and musician
- January 24: Nathaniel Dean, Australian actor
- January 25: Dat Phan, Vietnamese-American stand-up comedian and actor
- January 29: Kelly Packard, American actress
- January 31: Preity Zinta, Indian actress
- February 3: Terry Chen, Canadian actor
- February 4: Natalie Imbruglia, Australian-British singer and actress
- February 5: Alison Hammond, English television personality and actress
- February 7: Dan Green, American voice actor, voice director and screenwriter
- February 9: Rawson Marshall Thurber, American filmmaker and actor
- February 10: Scott Elrod, American former actor
- February 17: Raymond S. Persi, American animator, director, screenwriter, producer, storyboard artist and voice actor
- February 18: Hristo Zhivkov, Bulgarian actor (d. 2023)
- February 22: Drew Barrymore, American actress and director
- February 23: Callan Mulvey, Australian actor
- February 27: Quentin Kenihan, Australian writer and actor (d. 2018)
- March 2: Lee Sun-kyun, South Korean actor (d. 2023)
- March 3:
  - Patric Chiha, Austrian film director and screenwriter
  - Tiger Chen, Chinese martial artist, actor and stuntman
- March 9: Chaske Spencer, American actor and producer
- March 10: Yee Jee Tso, Canadian actor
- March 11: Josh Robert Thompson, American voice actor, actor, comedian and impressionist
- March 15:
  - Eva Longoria, American actress, director and producer
  - Will.i.am, American actor and singer/rapper
- March 16: Sienna Guillory, English actress
- March 17: Natalie Zea, American actress
- March 18: Charles Parnell, American actor
- March 21: Justin Pierce, American-British actor and skateboarder (d. 2000)
- March 22:
  - Guillermo Diaz, American actor
  - Nathan Greno, American director and writer
  - Cole Hauser, American actor
- March 24: Brennan Elliott, Canadian actor
- April 2:
  - Deedee Magno, Filipino-American actress and singer
  - Pedro Pascal, Chilean and American actor
  - Adam Rodriguez, American actor
- April 4: Georgina Cates, English actress (d. 2026)
- April 6: Zach Braff, American actor, director, screenwriter and producer
- April 10: David Harbour, American actor
- April 11: Gloria Calderón Kellett, American writer, producer, director and actress
- April 12: Camila Morgado, Brazilian actress
- April 13: Angus MacLane, American director, animator, screenwriter and voice actor
- April 14:
  - Amy Birnbaum, American voice actress
  - Anderson Silva, Brazilian mixed martial artist and boxer.
- April 15: Elissa Knight, American employee at Pixar and voice actress
- April 16: Karl Yune, American actor
- April 21: Charlie O'Connell, American actor
- April 27: Erica Schroeder, American voice actress
- April 30: Johnny Galecki, American actor
- May 2: Jenna Lamia, American actress and writer
- May 3:
  - Christina Hendricks, American actress
  - Dulé Hill, American actor
- May 4: Óscar Jaenada, Spanish actor
- May 8: Wilmer Calderon, Puerto Rican-American actor
- May 9: Chris Diamantopoulos, Greek-Canadian actor and voice artist
- May 22: Stephen Walters, English actor
- May 24: Will Sasso, Canadian-American actor, comedian, voice actor and podcaster
- May 26: Nicki Aycox, American actress and musician (d. 2022)
- May 27: André 3000, American singer, songwriter, rapper and actor
- June 4:
  - Russell Brand, English comedian, actor and radio host
  - Angelina Jolie, American actress
- June 6: Nina Kaczorowski, American actress and stuntwoman
- June 8: Shilpa Shetty, Indian actress
- June 10: Nicole Bilderback, Korean-born American actress
- June 19: Hugh Dancy, English actor
- June 22: Jeff Hephner, American actor
- June 23: Jeffrey Carlson, American actor and singer (d. 2023)
- June 25: Linda Cardellini, American actress
- June 27: Tobey Maguire, American actor
- June 28: Jeff Geddis, Canadian actor
- June 29: Șerban Pavlu, Romanian actor
- July 2: Elizabeth Reaser, American actress
- July 3: Ryan McPartlin, American actor
- July 5:
  - Sope Aluko, Nigerian-born British-American actress
  - Kip Gamblin, Australian actor
- July 6: 50 Cent, American actor and rapper
- July 7: Nina Hoss, German film and stage actress
- July 9: Nathaniel Marston, American actor and producer (d. 2015)
- July 10: Stefán Karl Stefánsson, Icelandic actor and singer (d. 2018)
- July 11:
  - Bridgette Andersen, American actress (d. 1997)
  - Bruno Gouery, French actor and writer
- July 13: Gareth Edwards, British filmmaker
- July 14: Jaime Gomez, American actor and rapper
- July 17:
  - Elena Anaya, Spanish actress
  - Cécile de France, Belgian actress
- July 19: Reuben Langdon, American stuntman and voice actor
- July 20:
  - Judy Greer, American actress
  - Jason Raize, American actor, singer and Goodwill Ambassador for the United Nations Environment Programme (d. 2004)
- July 21: David Dastmalchian, American actor
- July 22: Hannah Waterman, English actress
- July 23: Suriya, Indian actor
- July 28: Ori Pfeffer, Israeli actor
- August 4: Sari Lennick, American actress
- August 5:
  - Iddo Goldberg, Israeli actor
  - Jabez Olssen, New Zealand editor
  - Stéphanie Szostak, French actress
- August 7:
  - Megan Gale, Australian actress
  - Hans Matheson, Scottish actor and musician
  - Charlize Theron, South African-American actress
- August 9:
  - Mahesh Babu, Indian actor and producer
  - Anjali Jay, British actress and writer
- August 11: Roger Craig Smith, American actor and voice actor
- August 12: Casey Affleck, American actor
- August 13: James Carpinello, American actor
- August 16:
  - Brad Morris, American actor
  - Taika Waititi, New Zealand filmmaker, actor and comedian
- August 18: Kaitlin Olson, American actress and comedian
- August 19: Simone Kessell, New Zealand television
- August 22: Rodrigo Santoro, Brazilian actor
- August 24: James D'Arcy, English actor and director
- August 25: Raymond Wong Ho-yin, Hong Kong actor
- August 27: Bodie Olmos, American actor
- August 28:
  - Eugene Byrd, American actor
  - Nick E. Tarabay, Lebanese actor
- August 29:
  - Dante Basco, American actor
  - Juan Diego Botto, Argentine-Spanish actor
- September 1:
  - Scott Speedman, Canadian actor
  - Jason Zumwalt, American actor, voice actor, comedian and screenwriter
- September 2: MC Chris, American rapper, voice actor, comedian and writer
- September 10: Kyle Bornheimer, American actor and comedian
- September 18: Jason Sudeikis, American actor, comedian and screenwriter
- September 19: Daniel Eric Gold, American actor
- September 20: Moon Bloodgood, American actress
- September 22: Mireille Enos, American actress
- September 23:
  - Alex Karpovsky, American director, actor, screenwriter, producer and editor
  - Kip Pardue, American actor and model
- September 27: Sam Lee, Hong Kong actor
- September 30
  - Asia Argento, Italian actress
  - Marion Cotillard, French actress
  - Christopher Jackson, American actor, singer, musician and composer
- October 3 - Alanna Ubach, American actress
- October 4 - Reggie Lee, Filipino-American actor
- October 5
  - Parminder Nagra, English actress
  - Monica Rial, American voice actress
  - Scott Weinger, American actor
  - Kate Winslet, English actress
  - Diane Morgan, British actress
- October 7:
  - Tim Minchin, British-Australian comedian, actor, writer and musician
  - Kaspars Znotiņš, Latvian actor
- October 8: Richard Short, English actor
- October 10: Lenn Kudrjawizki, German actor and musician
- October 11: Nat Faxon, American actor, comedian, director and screenwriter
- October 15: Chukwudi Iwuji, Nigerian-British actor
- October 16:
  - Nelson Lee, Taiwanese-Canadian actor
  - Kellie Martin, American actress
- October 26: Lennon Parham, American actress
- October 29: Aksel Hennie, Norwegian actor, director and screenwriter
- October 31: Keith Jardine, American actor
- November 2: Danny Cooksey, American actor and musician
- November 8: Tara Reid, American actress
- November 11: Eyal Podell, Israeli-American actor and screenwriter
- November 12: Steven Kynman, British actor, puppeteer, writer and voice actor
- November 13: Aisha Hinds, American actress
- November 15: J. C. Brandy, British-born American actress
- November 16: David Leitch, American filmmaker, actor, stunt performer and stunt coordinator
- November 19: Sushmita Sen, Indian actress
- November 22: James Madio, American actor
- November 26: DJ Khaled, American DJ, rapper and actor
- December 1: David Hornsby, American actor
- December 5: Paula Patton, American actress
- December 6: Noel Clarke, British actor and filmmaker
- December 12: Mayim Bialik, American actress and game show host
- December 14: KaDee Strickland, American actress
- December 17
  - Milla Jovovich, Ukrainian-American actress
  - Hilje Murel, Estonian actress
  - Steve Zissis, American actor, writer and producer
- December 22: Omar Dorsey, American actor
- December 27: Heather O'Rourke, American child actress (d. 1988)
- December 29: Shawn Hatosy, American actor
- December 31: Amy Palant, American voice actress and singer

== Deaths ==
Month	Date	Name	Age	Country	Profession	Notable films
January	1	Arthur Pierson	73	Norway/US	Director, Actor	The Fighting O'Flynn; Home Town Story
January	9	Pierre Fresnay	77	France	Actor	La Grande Illusion; Le Corbeau
January	18	Gertrude Olmstead	77	US	Actress	The Boob; The Monster
January	21	Marie Lohr	84	Australia	Actress	The Winslow Boy; Great Catherine
January	24	Larry Fine	72	US	Actor	The Three Stooges; 4 for Texas
January	27	Bill Walsh	61	US	Screenwriter, Producer	Mary Poppins; Bedknobs and Broomsticks
February	1	Richard Wattis	62	UK	Actor	The Longest Day; The Man Who Knew Too Much
February	11	Maria Balcerkiewiczówna	71	Poland	Actress	Vampires of Warsaw; Augustus the Strong
February	17	George Marshall	83	US	Director	How the West Was Won; Destry Rides Again
February	20	Robert Strauss	61	US	Actor	Stalag 17; The Seven Year Itch
February	20	Lillian Fontaine	88	UK	Actress	The Locket; The Lost Weekend
March	3	Edward H. Griffith	86	US	Director	Honeymoon in Bali; Virginia
March	3	Therese Giehse	76	Germany	Actress	Mädchen in Uniform; Black Moon
March	4	Renée Björling	76	Sweden	Actress	Summer Interlude; A Lesson in Love
March	7	Ben Blue	73	Canada/US	Actor	The Big Broadcast of 1938; The Russians Are Coming, the Russians Are Coming
March	8	George Stevens	70	US	Director, Producer	A Place in the Sun; Giant
March	9	Shirley Ross	62	US	Actress	The Big Broadcast of 1938; Thanks for the Memory
March	14	Susan Hayward	57	US	Actress	I Want to Live!; The Snows of Kilimanjaro
March	15	John H. Auer	68	Hungary	Director, Producer	Johnny Trouble; City That Never Sleeps
March	15	Arthur Crabtree	74	UK	Director, Screenwriter	Caravan; Lilli Marlene
March	19	Harry Lachman	88	US	Director	Charlie Chan in Rio; It Happened in Hollywood
March	22	Cass Daley	59	US	Actress, Singer	Riding High; Ladies' Man
March	25	Michele Girardon	36	France	Actress	The Lovers; Hatari!
April	3	Mary Ure	42	UK	Actress	Where Eagles Dare; Look Back in Anger
April	5	Inez Courtney	67	US	Actress	Clarence; The 13th Man
April	10	Marjorie Main	85	US	Actress	Meet Me in St. Louis; Ma and Pa Kettle
April	13	Larry Parks	60	US	Actor	The Jolson Story; Down to Earth
April	14	Fredric March	77	US	Actor	The Best Years of Our Lives; A Star Is Born
April	15	Richard Conte	65	US	Actor	The Godfather; Ocean's 11
April	15	William Hartnell	67	UK	Actor	Hell Drivers; Carry On Sergeant
April	22	Mary Philips	74	US	Actress	A Farewell to Arms; Leave Her to Heaven
May	4	Moe Howard	77	US	Actor	The Three Stooges; Men in Black
May	9	Philip Dorn	73	Netherlands	Actor	Random Harvest; I Remember Mama
May	22	Torben Meyer	90	Germany	Actor	Roberta; Till We Meet Again
May	30	Michel Simon	80	Switzerland	Actor	L'Atalante; The Train
June	3	Ozzie Nelson	69	US	Actor	Sweetheart of the Campus; The Impossible Years
June	4	Evelyn Brent	75	US	Actress	Underworld; The Last Command
June	6	Larry Blyden	49	US	Actor	On a Clear Day You Can See Forever; Kiss Them for Me
June	11	Jane Griffiths	45	UK	Actress	The Million Pound Note; The Durant Affair
June	28	Rod Serling	50	US	Screenwriter	Seven Days in May; Planet of the Apes
July	2	James Robertson Justice	68	UK	Actor	The Guns of Navarone; Moby Dick
July	2	Audrey Maas	40	US	Producer	Alice Doesn't Live Here Anymore
July	14	Madan Mohan	51	India	Music director	Veer-Zaara
July	20	Richard Gaines	70	US	Actor	Double Indemnity; The More the Merrier
July	28	Alfred L. Werker	78	US	Director	The Adventures of Sherlock Holmes; Repeat Performance
August	2	Jean Yarbrough	73	US	Director	Inside Job; Shed No Tears
August	7	Phyllis Povah	82	US	Actress	The Women; Pat and Mike
August	11	Howard Wendell	67	US	Actor	The Fighting Chance; The Four Skulls of Jonathan Drake
August	23	Sidney Buchman	73	US	Screenwriter	Mr. Smith Goes to Washington; Here Comes Mr. Jordan
August	23	Hank Patterson	86	US	Actor	The Arizona Kid; Tarantula
August	25	Joseph Kane	81	US	Director	King of the Cowboys; Flame of Barbary Coast
August	29	Bob Baker	64	US	Actor	The Singing Outlaw; The Phantom Stage
August	31	Pierre Blaise	20	France	Actor	Lacombe, Lucien; Down the Ancient Staircase
September	9	John McGiver	61	US	Actor	The Manchurian Candidate; Midnight Cowboy
September	19	Pamela Brown	58	UK	Actress	Lust for Life; Becket
September	24	Clive Morton	71	UK	Actor	The Moonraker; Kind Hearts and Coronets
September	27	Mark Frechette	27	US	Actor	Zabriskie Point; Many Wars Ago
October	16	Don Barclay	82	US	Actor	Man Hunt; Mary Poppins
October	18	Al Lettieri	47	US	Actor	The Godfather; The Getaway
October	19	Cesare Bettarini	74	Italy	Actor	Like the Leaves
October	24	Martin Boddey	68	UK	Actor	Carry on Sergeant; Carry on Nurse
October	31	Joseph Calleia	78	Malta/US	Actor, Singer	After the Thin Man; Touch of Evil
November	2	Pier Paolo Pasolini	53	Italy	Director, Screenwriter, Actor	The Hawks and the Sparrows; Teorema
November	4	Sheila Ryan	54	US	Actress	Dressed to Kill; Song of Texas
November	5	Annette Kellerman	88	Australia	Actress	Venus of the South Seas; A Daughter of the Gods
November	17	Kay Johnson	70	US	Actress	Dynamite; Of Human Bondage
December	7	Hardie Albright	71	US	Actor	Three-Cornered Moon; The Scarlet Letter
December	9	William A. Wellman	79	US	Director	Wings; Battleground
December	13	Cyril Delevanti	88	UK	Actor	Mary Poppins; Soylent Green
December	14	Arthur Treacher	81	UK	Actor	Thank You, Jeeves!; Heidi
December	17	Frank Sully	67	US	Actor	The Grapes of Wrath; Joe Palooka in the Counterpunch
December	20	William Lundigan	61	US	Actor	The House on Telegraph Hill; Love Nest
December	21	Rowland V. Lee	84	US	Director	Son of Frankenstein; Captain Kidd
December	24	Bernard Herrmann	64	US	Composer	Psycho; Taxi Driver

== Film debuts ==
- Tom Alter – Mrig Trishna
- Jack Angel – Funny Lady
- Pernilla August – Giliap
- Michael Berryman – Doc Savage: The Man of Bronze
- Bruce Boxleitner – Sixpack Annie
- Jay Brazeau – The Melting Pot
- Bryan Brown – Scobie Malone
- Kim Cattrall – Rosebud
- Maury Chaykin – Me
- George Cheung – The Killer Elite
- George Coe – The Stepford Wives
- Tom Conti – Galileo
- Robert Costanzo – Dog Day Afternoon
- Tim Curry – The Rocky Horror Picture Show
- Ken Davitian – Sons of Sassoun
- John de Lancie – Legacy
- John Debney (film composer) – The Strongest Man in the World
- Brad Dourif – One Flew Over the Cuckoo's Nest
- Griffin Dunne – The Other Side of the Mountain
- Joe Estevez – Lucky Lady
- Conchata Ferrell – Deadly Hero
- Laurence Fishburne – Cornbread, Earl and Me
- Carrie Fisher – Shampoo
- M. C. Gainey – Hard Times
- Richard Gere – Report to the Commissioner
- Patrick Gorman – Three Days of the Condor
- Debbie Harry – Deadly Hero
- Bernard Hill – It Could Happen to You
- Danny Huston – The "Human" Factor
- Brion James – Hard Times
- Wolf Kahler – Barry Lyndon
- James Keane – Three Days of the Condor
- Nastassja Kinski – The Wrong Move
- Christopher Lloyd – One Flew Over the Cuckoo's Nest
- Mary Stuart Masterson – The Stepford Wives
- Richard Masur – Whiffs
- Rudy Ray Moore – Dolemite
- Chris Mulkey – Loose Ends
- Sam Neill – Landfall
- Bill Paxton – Crazy Mama
- Dennis Quaid – Crazy Mama
- Rajinikanth – Apoorva Raagangal
- Leo Rossi – Alias Big Cherry
- Chris Sarandon – Dog Day Afternoon
- Gailard Sartain – Nashville
- Sandra Seacat – Night Moves
- Lin Shaye – Hester Street
- Don Stark – Switchblade Sisters
- Patrick Stewart – Hennessy
- John Travolta – The Devil's Rain
- Vlasta Vrána – Shivers
- Dee Wallace – The Stepford Wives
- Steven Williams – Cooley High
- Treat Williams – Deadly Hero
