= Manipayal =

- Theatrical release poster
- Directed by: A. Jagannathan
- Screenplay by: R. M. Veerappan
- Story by: Poovai Krishnan
- Produced by: R. M. Veerappan
- Starring: A. V. M. Rajan; Jayanthi; Master Sekhar; Baby Indra
- Cinematography: Dutt
- Edited by: Krishnan Sundaram
- Music by: M. S. Viswanathan
- Production company: Sathya Movies
- Release date: 14 January 1973
- Running time: 149 minutes
- Country: India
- Language: Tamil

Manipayal (transl. Good Boy) is a 1973 Indian Tamil-language film, directed by A. Jagannathan in his debut and produced by R. M. Veerappan. The film stars Master Sekhar and Baby Indra, with A. V. M. Rajan, Jayanthi, V. K. Ramasamy and S. V. Subbaiah playing supporting roles. It was released on 14 January 1973.

== Plot ==
A cobbler finds himself in prison after being wrongly accused of a crime. He must find a way to prove his innocence in order to lead a dignified life.

== Cast ==
- A. V. M. Rajan as Arun
- Jayanthi as Shanthi
- Master Sekhar as Ilangovan
- Baby Indra as Selvi
- V. K. Ramasamy as Ponnambalam
- S. A. Ashokan as Parasuram
- Thengai Srinivasan as Amavasai
- Manorama as Andal
- S. V. Subbaiah as Kandhan
- Master Prabhakar as Kasi
- M. S. Sundari Bai as Sivagami
- Rajakokila as Rossie
- Shanmugasundari as Arun's mother
- Isari Velan as Shanthi's house cook
- Ennathe Kannaiah as Constable Alwar Naidu
- Kundumani as Kalimuthu
- Usilai Mani in Cameo Appearance
- Haalam as Dancer

== Production ==
A. Jagannathan, who earlier assisted T. Prakash Rao and P. Neelakantan made his directorial debut with this film.

== Soundtrack ==
Music was by M. S. Viswanathan and lyrics were by Vaali, Avinasimani and Pulamaipithan. Jayachandran made his debut in Tamil as a singer with the song "Thangachimizh Pol" in this film.

Song	Singers	Lyrics	Length
"Engal Tamil Annai" Kanchiyile Oru Buthan	Sirkazhi Govindarajan, L. R. Eswari	Pulamaipithan	05:46
"Thanga Chimizh Pol"	P. Jayachandran & Pushpalatha	Vaali	04:42
"Naan Aadinaal Oru Vagai"	S. Janaki	Vaali	04:01
"Enadi Ammo"	Latha & Radha	Avinashi Mani	04:31
"Naan Ulle"	L. R. Eswari	Vaali	04:06

== Reception ==
Kanthan of Kalki appreciated Dutt's cinematography and Jagannathan's direction, calling Manipayal an entertaining film in many aspects. Navamani found the film to be similar to the films of M. G. Ramachandran and praising the cast, dialogues, music and direction.
