= Chakravarthy (1977 film) =

- Directed by: Krishnan–Panju
- Story by: Mahendran
- Starring: Jaishankar; Thengai Srinivasan; Srikanth; S. A. Ashokan
- Music by: V. Kumar
- Production company: P. V. T. Productions
- Release date: 1977
- Running time: 157 minutes
- Country: India
- Language: Tamil

Chakravarthy is a 1977 Indian Tamil-language action drama film directed by Krishnan–Panju. The film stars Jaishankar, Thengai Srinivasan, Srikanth and S. A. Ashokan.

== Plot ==
Chakravarthy, a rich boy; Ranjit, a criminal's son brought up by Chakravarthy's family; and Prakash are close friends. Chakravarthy, who becomes a renowned surgeon, finds his short temper the main cause of the rift between him and Ranjit, who had become a police officer. Chakravarthy, by saving Ranjit's wife from molestation and rescuing Ranjit's own sister from the slums, eventually clears his friend's misunderstandings about him.

== Cast ==
- Jaishankar as Chakravarthy
- Thengai Srinivasan as Prakash
- Srikanth as Ranjit
- S. A. Ashokan
- Senthamarai as Marthandan
- V. S. Raghavan (guest appearance)
- Sarada as Geetha
- Sripriya
- Y. Vijaya as Rosy
- M. N. Rajam
- S. N. Parvathy
- Manorama

== Production ==
Chakravarthy was directed by the duo Krishnan–Panju, and produced by P. V. T. Productions. The story and dialogues were written by Mahendran. The final length of the film measured 4,281.54 metres (14,047.0 ft). Sivaji Ganesan and Sujatha were originally announced to be the lead pair in mid-1976.

== Soundtrack ==
The soundtrack was composed by V. Kumar, and the lyrics were written by Kannadasan.

Track listing
No.	Title	Singer(s)	Length
1.	"En Ooru Mysore"	S. Janaki
2.	"Aadharama Nirkkum"
3.	"Aarathi Yedungadi"	Manorama
4.	"Thathalanguthu"	Manorama
5.	"Vaa Valliyammai"	P. Susheela
6.	"Gangai Yamunai"

== Reception ==
R. N. of Free India wrote, "Though the story is spread on a weak trellis, Krishnan–Panju could have given a better entertainer without the dragging boat chase".
