= Thangavel =

Thangavel தங்கவேல்
- Pronunciation: Taṅkavēl
- Gender: Male
- Language: Tamil

Origin
- Meaning: Golden Vel
- Region of origin: Southern India; North-eastern Sri Lanka

Other names
- Alternative spelling: Thangavelu
- Derived: Murugan
- Related names: Ganavel; Palanivel; Rajavel; Vetrivel; Veeravel

Thangavel (Tamil: தங்கவேல், romanized: Taṅkavēl) or Thangavelu (Tamil: தங்கவேலு, romanized: Taṅkavēlu) is a Tamil male given name. Due to the Tamil tradition of using patronymic surnames it may also be a surname for males and females.

== Notable people ==
=== Given name ===
- A. L. Thangavel, Indian politician
- Mariyappan Thangavelu, Indian Paralympic high jumper
- K. A. Thangavelu, Indian film actor
- N. Thangavel, Indian politician
- K. Thangavel, Indian politician
- M. Thangavel, Indian politician
- S. Thangavelu, Indian politician

=== Surname ===
- Thangavelu Asokan, Indian engineer
