= Bhale Dongalu (1976 film) =

1976 Indian film by K. S. R. Das

- Directed by: K. S. R. Das
- Produced by: G. Sambasiva Rao; P. Babji
- Starring: Krishna; Manjula; Mohan Babu; Padmanabham; Jayamalini
- Cinematography: Pushpala Gopikrishna
- Edited by: N.S. Prakasam; D. Venkat Ratnam
- Music by: Satyam
- Production company: Trimurti Productions
- Release date: 29 October 1976
- Country: India
- Language: Telugu

Bhale Dongalu is a 1976 Indian Telugu-language action drama film directed by K. S. R. Das and produced under Trimurti Productions. The film stars Krishna and Manjula, with Mohan Babu, Prabhakar Reddy, Padmanabham, and Nagabhushanam in supporting roles. The music was composed by Satyam. It is a remake of the 1974 Hindi film Chor Machaye Shor.

The film follows Sekhar, an engineer wrongfully imprisoned, who escapes with fellow inmates and finds himself in a remote village entangled in a web of danger and corruption. Notably, Bhale Dongalu was the first Telugu film to be made in Fujicolor. It was a commercial success.

== Plot ==
Engineer Sekhar is falsely accused of attempting to assault a woman and is sentenced to prison despite proclaiming his innocence. While in jail, he initially clashes with Ranga, a fellow inmate, but the two eventually reconcile and form a close bond. Sekhar also befriends Chinna and Gunna, two petty thieves serving time. During his imprisonment, Sekhar reflects on his love for Rekha, a wealthy woman, and the societal class differences that separated them. Rekha's father, along with a corrupt politician, Kanaka Rao, conspired to frame Sekhar, leading to his imprisonment.

Determined to prove his innocence, Sekhar escapes from prison with the help of his newfound friends. Reuniting with Rekha, he uncovers the conspiracy orchestrated by her father and Kanaka Rao. Together, Sekhar and Rekha, accompanied by his prison companions, arrive in Santhi Nagar, a remote village. Mistaken for political representatives sent to improve the village, they are warmly welcomed by the locals. Embracing their new roles, the group works to uplift the community and protect it from a gang of bandits who have long terrorized the villagers.

The bandits, in collaboration with Kanaka Rao, plot to eliminate Sekhar and his allies. A fierce conflict ensues, with Sekhar, his friends, and the villagers joining forces to defeat the bandits. The battle ultimately exposes Kanaka Rao's misdeeds, leading to his arrest and the restoration of peace in Santhi Nagar. The story concludes with harmony returned to the village.

== Cast ==
- Krishna as Sekhar
- Manjula as Rekha
- Mohan Babu as Ranga
- Nagabhushanam as Chinna
- Padmanabham as Gunna
- Prabhakar Reddy as Kanaka Rao
- Tyagaraju
- Mikkilineni as Rekha's father
- K. V. Chalam
- Mada
- Jayamalini

== Production ==
The film was produced by G. Sambasiva Rao and P. Babji on Trimurti Productions banner. The dialogues were written by Bhamidipati Radhakrishna. Notably, it was shot in Fujicolor, making it the first Telugu film to use this technology.

== Music ==
The film's soundtrack, composed by Satyam, features lyrics by Dasaradhi, Aarudra, Kosaraju, and Gopi. One of the songs is adapted from the original Hindi film Chor Machaye Shor.

- "Vachadu Choodu Varasainavadu" – Adapted from "Le Jayenge Le Jayenge"
- "Pandanti Chinnadira"
- "Andamaina Chinnavada"
- "Chusane Olammi Chusane" – Sung by S. P. Balasubrahmanyam and P. Suseela
- "Kandalu Pindi Panichesthe"

== Reception ==
Andhra Patrika gave a positive review of the film, praising its production values, the performances of Krishna and Mohan Babu, Bhamidipati's witty dialogues, and K. S. R. Das's direction. In contrast, Andhra Bhoomi provided a negative review, criticizing Das's direction, the use of Fujicolor, the loudness of the songs, and the background music. However, the performance of Mohan Babu received appreciation.

The film was successful at the box office. Mohan Babu's catchphrase in the film "Chikkar Mein Rakka" gained popularity with audiences.
