= Sethupathi IPS =

- Theatrical release poster
- Directed by: P. Vasu
- Written by: P. Vasu
- Produced by: M. Saravanan
- Starring: Vijayakanth; Meena
- Cinematography: M. C. Sekar
- Edited by: P. Mohan Raj
- Music by: Ilaiyaraaja
- Production company: AVM Productions
- Distributed by: AVM Productions
- Release date: 14 January 1994
- Running time: 147 minutes
- Country: India
- Language: Tamil

Sethupathi IPS (/seɪθupəθi/) is a 1994 Indian Tamil-language political action film written and directed by P. Vasu, produced by AVM Productions. The film stars Vijayakanth and Meena. It deals with the story of a police officer who fights against terrorism. Sethupathi IPS was released on 14 January 1994, during Pongal, and became one of Vijayakanth's most successful films of the decade.

== Plot ==
Terrorism against India is escalated heavily by Indians trained abroad. Sethupathi IPS is a cop whose entire family has served the country at some time — his mother Satyabhama is an IAS Officer, his maternal grandfather was a soldier who got a medal for killing 200 enemies (a medal which Sethupathi secretly covets), and his father in law is an Inspector General of Police.

Sethupathi catches terrorist Sivasubramaniam in a hospital and coaxes him to reveal information that their gang is planning a terrorist strike on the Prime minister of India during his meeting with Chief Ministers of various states in Chennai. After divulging this information (owing to the kindness and pity shown by Sethupathi), the terrorist commits suicide with Sethupathi's gun. Using the information, Sethupathi is able to save the day and the Prime minister.

Sivasubramaniam's death leads to his brother Sivaprakasham arriving in India. Sivaprakasham is also the leader of this terrorist gang, and in addition to the terror strike the gang is planning to launch in India, he also plans to wipe out Sethupathi's family.

Moving opposite to Sethupathi's house, Sivaprakasam pretends to be a very nice man "Satyaprakasham" and manages to fool Sethupathi's mother, wife, sister, and grandfather and convinces all of them of his true intentions to such an extent that they agree to his engagement with their mute daughter Saraswathi. Sivaprakasam avoids Sethupathi and sees to it that during both the engagement and the wedding, Sethupathi is occupied so that he cannot come face to face with Sivaprakasam.

After the wedding, the Terrorists take over a school where Sethupathi's wife is a teacher and demands for a plane and money to take them abroad. Sivaprakasam brings his wife (Sethupathi's sister) and watches her get gang raped until Sethupathi's wife shoots her, unable to bear her suffering. Sivaprakasam also shoots a boy student of class v.

As the terrorists escape the school towards the plane and take off, Sethupathi has arrived after having killed one of their numbers, and disguising himself, he eliminates all of them, including Sivaprakasam and lands the plane safely (on instructions of the injured pilot).

The movie ends with Sethupathi receiving his coveted grandfather's medal.

== Cast ==
- Vijayakanth as DCP Sethupathi IPS
- Meena as Chandramathi
- M. N. Nambiar as Ramarathnam
- Srividya as Sathyabama IAS
- Kaveri as Saraswathi
- Vijayakumar as Head of Police Ramanathan
- Kazan Khan as K. Shiva Prakash/Shantharam
- Delhi Ganesh as Kesavan
- Mohan Raman as the police inspector Sivaraman
- Goundamani as Muthaiya
- Senthil as Alagappan
- Kovai Sarala as Jhansi
- Thyagu as Srinivasan
- Master Srinivas (uncredited)

== Production ==
The story of Sethupathi IPS was written for Sathyaraj, although Vijayakanth was ultimately cast. The scene where Vijayakanth's character climbs a clock tower was shot in a clock tower set built at Adyar auditorium. He did not use a stunt double for the scene or tie a rope around himself. Another scene, where the character faces terrorists was shot with 70 cars over 18 days. Vijayakanth considered it the riskiest stunt sequence he ever performed to that point. Filming took place entirely in Chennai, and lasted 180 working days. Some scenes were shot at Rajaji Hall.

== Soundtrack ==
The music was composed by Ilaiyaraaja, with lyrics by Vaali.

Song	Singers	Length
"Anathai Endru"	Bhavatharini	04:13
"Mazhalai Endrum"	K. S. Chithra	05:59
"Saathu Nada"	Asha Bhosle, Ilaiyaraaja	05:53
"Vanna Mozhi Maane"	K. J. Yesudas	04:56
"Vidiyum Neram"	Sunanda	05:43

== Release ==
Sethupathi IPS was released on 14 January 1994, during Pongal, and distributed by AVM Productions. Despite clashing against other Pongal releases such as Mahanadhi, Amaidhi Padai, Rajakumaran, Veetla Visheshanga, Siragadikka Aasai and Sindhu Nathi Poo, it became a box office success.

== Critical reception ==
The Indian Express wrote, "Director Vasu draws inspiration from [..] few real-life incidents. But somehow these incidents stand apart [..] the film as a whole is little too glib and superficial." Thulasi of Kalki wrote that the director has plagiarised scenes from Cliffhanger and felt he seemed to have taken an oath that he would not move out from the formula even a bit. The Hindu wrote on 21 January 1994, "The action comes in waves, on the streets — the one near Napier bridge where Vijayakanth indulges in risky fights — and in the well-lit (!) gutters and in the studio made plane, though miniature photography is still new".
