= Rickshawkaran =

1971 film by M. Krishnan Nair

- Theatrical release poster
- Directed by: M. Krishnan
- Screenplay by: R. M. Veerappan
- Story by: R. M. Veerappan; S. Jagadeesan; Radha Veerannan
- Produced by: R. M. Veerappan
- Starring: M. G. Ramachandran; Padmini; Manjula
- Cinematography: V. Ramamoorthy
- Edited by: C. P. Jambulingam
- Music by: M. S. Viswanathan
- Production company: Sathya Movies
- Release date: 29 May 1971
- Running time: 162 minutes
- Country: India
- Language: Tamil

Rickshawkaran (transl. The Rickshaw Man) is a 1971 Indian Tamil-language vigilante film directed by M. Krishnan Nair and produced by R. M. Veerappan, who doubled as screenwriter. The film stars M. G. Ramachandran, Padmini and Manjula, with S. A. Ashokan, Major Sundarrajan and Manohar in supporting roles. It revolves around a rickshaw puller who witnesses a murder and decides to unearth the mystery behind it, leading to him uncovering a bigger conspiracy.

Rickshawkaran was released on 29 May 1971. It was a major commercial success, with a theatrical run of over 100 days. For his performance, Ramachandran won the National Film Award for Best Actor in a Leading Role, becoming the first South Indian actor to do so, though he also became the subject of criticism for allegedly using political influence to his advantage. The film was later remade in Hindi as Rickshawala (1973).

== Plot ==
Selvam, a rickshaw puller, sees Kailasam murder another rickshaw puller Manickam. Kailasam's brother-in-law Dharmaraj, an advocate, also happens to witness the murder but leaves the place silently. Selvam demands justice from Dharmaraj who states that it is his duty to protect his client Kailasam.

Dharmaraj becomes a judge. At a college festival, Kailasam, the college president, sets his eyes on Uma, a student and decides to traffic her to his overseas clients. He orders his subordinate Mannar to kidnap Uma. Uma secretly goes to meet her mother Parvathi in Selvam's rickshaw and Mannar tries to kidnap her. Selvam fights him off and saves Uma, and Parvathi helps her escape. Mannar files a police complaint and Selvam is arrested. During the trial, Parvathi's silence leads to Selvam being convicted. Dharmaraj bails out Selvam, but Selvam immediately repays him the bail amount and refuses favours from Dharmaraj.

Seeing the harassment Parvathi faces, Selvam invites her to live in his house. While shifting, he sees an old photograph of Parvathi with his sister Kamalam. Since he had studied and worked abroad, Selvam had lost touch with his family. Mannar and his men try to kidnap Uma and she escapes in Selvam's rickshaw. She doubts that Selvam belongs to the same gang and goes into Dharmaraj's house. Dharmaraj tells her that Selvam was convicted because of her absence as witness and also that he is educated and has taken up this job for a living. Hearing his good deeds, Uma falls in love with Selvam.

Selvam moves the court on Manickam's murder case and Kailasam demands Dharmaraj to support him, which he rejects. Kailasam threatens to expose Dharmaraj. He also learns that Parvathi and Uma meet secretly and threatens to expose them. Kailasam's goon takes a picture of Uma with Selvam, and Kailasam uses it in college to tarnish Uma's character. When the management demands an explanation, she says that she is not an orphan and promises to bring her mother. Uma takes Selvam along with her to bring her mother and Selvam is shocked to know that it is Parvathi. Parvathi meets Dharmaraj, reveals that Uma is his daughter and seeks his support and Dharmaraj agrees. When Parvathi comes to the college to declare Uma as her daughter, Kailasam brings Karmegham, Parvathi's husband whose threatening presence silences her again, leading to Uma being dismissed from the college.

Karmegham tries to kill Parvathi, doubting her chastity as she had a baby when he was away serving a jail term and Selvam saves her. Parvathi reveals the facts: Uma is actually the daughter of her friend Kamalam, who was Dharmaraj's wife and Selvam's sister. Kailasam, who was keen to get his sister married to Dharmaraj, alleged Kamalam of adultery and made Dharmaraj poison her slowly. Kamalam gave her child Uma to Parvathi and requested her to bring up the child as her own. Karmegham, who returned from prison, saw the newborn and doubted Parvathi's character and tried to kill Uma. Thus, Uma had threats from both Dharmaraj and Karmegham and she had to bring up Uma secretly. Dharmaraj, out of guilt, confesses Kamalam's murder to the Chief Justice.

Dharmaraj confesses to Selvam, and when Selvam tries to take revenge on him, Uma shoots Dharmaraj and escapes. Selvam catches her and observes a change in her behaviour. Dharmaraj apologises for his mistakes to Selvam before dying. Police arrest Uma, and Selvam works out a plan with the Police and Uma is administered an injection which prevents her from speaking. Uma is kidnapped from the hospital by Kailasam's men and Selvam, disguised as a driver, follows them. Selvam and the police find out the trafficking activities carried out by Kailasam and the police arrest everyone. Kailasam shoots Uma dead and when he expresses his satisfaction, Selvam reveals that the girl shot dead is actually Kailasam's lover Rosy disguised as Uma who was sent by Kailasam to kill Dharmaraj. Selvam, who found out this secret, had given an injection to prevent her from speaking and used her as a body double. Kailasam is arrested, while Uma and Selvam marry.

== Cast ==
- M. G. Ramachandran as Selvam
- Padmini as Parvathi
- Manjula as Uma
- S. A. Ashokan as Kailasam
- Major Sundarrajan as K. Dharmaraj
- Manohar as Karmegham
- Thengai Srinivasan as Vandu
- Cho Ramaswamy as Pitchumani
- Poornam Viswanathan as Judge
- Jyothi Lakshmi as item dancer
- G. Sakunthala as Kamala
- S. V. Ramadas as Mannar
- Karikol Raju as Vadivelu
- Ennatha Kannaiya as Nadaswaram
- Isari Velan as Beauty parlor owner
- Usilai Mani
- Jayakumari
- Veeraraghavan as Inspector
- Vijaya Chandrika as Munimma
- Gundu Karuppiah

== Production ==
Rickshawkaran was directed by M. Krishnan Nair, and produced by R. M. Veerappan under Sathya Movies. The story was written by Veerappan (who also wrote the screenplay), S. Jagadeesan and Radha Veerannan. Editing was handled by C. P. Jambulingam, and the cinematography by V. Ramamoorthy. There were conflicting views on the selection of the female lead between lead actor M. G. Ramachandran and Veerappan. Ramachandran wanted his frequent co-star Jayalalithaa for the female lead while Veerappan wanted to include someone else. The result went in Veerappan's favour and Manjula was cast, thereby making her debut as a lead actress. According to Jayalalithaa's biographer P. C. Ganesan, Veerappan disliked Jayalalithaa's proximity to Ramachandran and, being a shrewd schemer, he successfully persuaded Ramachandran that his "fans were fed up with MGR-Jayalalitha pair"; Ramachandran, not wanting to risk losing his popularity, gave in to Veerappan's suggestion.

Padmini was cast Parvathi, replacing the original actress who was removed after 3,000 feet (910 m) was canned as the makers were not satisfied. Padmini's casting caused some backlash among the public since she and Ramachandran had acted as lovers in earlier films. The director was billed in the opening credits as "M. Krishnan", omitting his surname Nair at Ramachandran's suggestion. Ramachandran disliked the song "Azhagiya Thamizh Magal" and requested Veerappan to remove it, but after Veerappan convinced him, the song was retained. The song was shot on a large set that was nearly 40-feet high, and was budgeted at approximately a lakh. The song "Kadaloram Vangiya Katru", picturised on Ramachandran and Manjula, was shot on the bridge across the Adyar River, which later became known as the Broken Bridge.

== Themes ==
According to critic Gautaman Bhaskaran, Rickshawkaran, like most other films starring Ramachandran, portrays him simultaneously as an action hero and champion for the downtrodden. Tamil Canadian journalist D. B. S. Jeyaraj also felt the same, adding that Ramachandran portrayed different roles in his films "so that different segments of the population could relate to and identify with him", citing his role of a rickshaw puller in Rickshawkaran, a coxswain in Padagotti (1964) and an agriculturist in Vivasayi (1967) as examples. A writer for the magazine Asiaweek described Rickshawkaran as being a "sympathetic movie" about rickshaw pullers in Madras (now Chennai).

S. Rajanayagam wrote in the book Popular Cinema and Politics in South India: The Films of MGR and Rajinikanth that in most of his films such as Rickshawkaran, Ramachandran took care to behaviourally exhibit his character's subaltern identity by showing the character engaged in a specific action that characterises the occupation. He also considered that the pictures of Mahatma Gandhi, C. N. Annadurai, Subramania Bharati and Crucifix being props in Selvam's hut was an example of Ramachandran subtly manipulating cinema to maintain his identity as an artiste of the Dravida Munnetra Kazhagam (DMK), and simultaneously propagate his own vision of society.

Rajanayagam felt the title Rickshawkaran, like the titles of many other Ramachandran films, was "sober, occupation-oriented and positive", while also referring to the subalterns in the third person non-honorific singular (rikshaakaaran), which is commonly considered disrespectful. Writing for Jump Cut, Kumuthan Maderya felt that Ramachandran wearing a red shirt and black pants onscreen was an "anagrammatic" reference to the colours of the DMK flag.

== Soundtrack ==
The music was composed by M. S. Viswanathan. The song "Azhagiya Tamil Magal" is set in Charukesi raga.

Track listing
No.	Title	Lyrics	Singer(s)	Length
1.	"Kadaloram Vangiya Katru"	Vaali	T. M. Soundararajan
2.	"Ange Siripavargal Sirikattum"	Vaali	T. M. Soundararajan
3.	"Pambai Udukkai Katti"	Avinasi Mani	T. M. Soundararajan, P. Susheela
4.	"Ponnazhaguppenmai"	Vaali	P. Susheela, L. R. Eswari, K. Veeramani
5.	"Azhagiya Thamizh Magal"	Vaali	T. M. Soundararajan, P. Susheela

== Release and reception ==
Rickshawkaran was released on 29 May 1971. The magazine Ananda Vikatan, in a review dated 13 June 1971, wrote that the film was an excellent companion to spend three hours in a theatre, and also praised the story. On 4 June 1971, The Hindu wrote that Ramachandran, despite his advanced age was still a "popular, vigorous romantic hero" who "demonstrates the dignity of labour". The film was a major commercial success, playing for 163 days at the Devi Paradise theatre, and for 100 days at 12 other theatres all over Tamil Nadu. To celebrate the film's success, Ramachandran gave raincoats to around 6,000 rickshaw pullers in Chennai. In a career spanning 133 films, he considered the film his fourteenth break. R. Kannan, author of MGR: A Life, considered the film his "biggest box office hit ever". Rickshawkaran was remade in Hindi as Rickshawala (1973), which did not achieve the same success.

== Accolades ==
At the 19th National Film Awards, Ramachandran won the National Film Award for Best Actor in a Leading Role for his role, the first South Indian actor to do so. Critics accused the victory of being orchestrated by the DMK, with Blitz alleging that Ramachandran paid ₹40,000 (equivalent to ₹1.9 million or US$20,000 in 2023) for the award, a story that was backed by Dina Thanthi. Ramachandran retorted, "At no time, have I run seeking position, title and fame. I have the belief that they should come looking for you." Ashis Barman wrote in the magazine Link, "both the film [Rickshawkaran] and Ramachandran's acting in it were atrocious." Ramachandran considered returning the award following accusations of using political influence to his advantage, but relented when the committee explained its reasons for awarding him. Politician M. Karunanidhi said Ramachandran was "fully deserving of the award".

== Bibliography ==
- Dhananjayan, G. (2014). Pride of Tamil Cinema: 1931–2013. Blue Ocean Publishers. OCLC 898765509.
- Ganesan, P. C. (1996). Daughter of the South: Biography of Jayalalitha. Sterling Publishers. ISBN 8120718798.
- Kannan, R. (2017). MGR: A Life. India: Penguin Random House. ISBN 978-0-14-342934-0.
- Rajanayagam, S. (2015). Popular Cinema and Politics in South India: The Films of MGR and Rajinikanth. Routledge. ISBN 978-1-138-82203-0.
