= Agnimrigam =

- Directed by: M. Krishnan Nair
- Written by: Kanam E. J.
- Screenplay by: Thoppil Bhasi
- Starring: Prem Nazir; Sathyan; Sheela; K. P. Ummer
- Cinematography: R. C. Purushothaman
- Edited by: V. P. Krishnan
- Music by: G. Devarajan
- Production company: Excel Productions
- Distributed by: Excel Productions
- Release date: 19 November 1971
- Country: India
- Language: Malayalam

Agnimrigam (transl. Fiery Creature) is a 1971 Indian Malayalam-language horror thriller film directed by M. Krishnan Nair. The film stars Prem Nazir, Sathyan, Sheela and K. P. Ummer in the lead roles. The film has musical score by G. Devarajan. It is based on The Hound of the Baskervilles. It was a commercial success.

== Cast ==
- Prem Nazir as Ramesh
- Sathyan as Mukundan
- Sheela as Bhanumathi
- K. P. Ummer as Raveendran
- Ravichandran as Vijayan
- Adoor Bhasi as P. C. Pillai
- Adoor Pankajam as Karthyayini
- Alummoodan as Dominic
- G. K. Pillai as Jayapalan
- Jayakumari as Valli
- Joshiy as Murderer
- Kottayam Chellappan as Kailasanathan
- S. P. Pillai as Shankunni

== Plot ==
The movie was an adaptation of Sir Arthur Conan Doyle's The Hound of the Baskervilles.

== Soundtrack ==
The music was composed by G. Devarajan and the lyrics were written by Vayalar Ramavarma.

No.	Song	Singers	Lyrics	Length (m:ss)
1	"Alakaapuri Alakaapuri"	K. J. Yesudas, P. Madhuri	Vayalar Ramavarma	
2	"Kaarkuzhali Karinkuzhali"	B. Vasantha	Vayalar Ramavarma	
3	"Marunno Nalla Marunnu"	K. J. Yesudas, Chorus	Vayalar Ramavarma	
4	"Premam Sthreepurusha"	K. J. Yesudas	Vayalar Ramavarma	
5	"Thenmala Venmala"	L. R. Eeswari, Chorus	Vayalar Ramavarma	
