= Siragadikka Aasai =

- Poster
- Directed by: Vijayachandran
- Screenplay by: Vijayachandran
- Story by: Geetha
- Produced by: V. M. Selvan
- Starring: Sivakumar; Vijayakumar; Manjula Vijayakumar; Zeenat
- Cinematography: K. S Selvaraj
- Edited by: Lancy Mohan
- Music by: Manoj Saran
- Production company: Yadhav Productions
- Release date: 14 January 1994
- Running time: 135 minutes
- Country: India
- Language: Tamil

Siragadikka Aasai (transl. The desire to fly) is a 1994 Indian Tamil-language coming-of-age film directed by Vijayachandran. The film stars Sivakumar, Vijayakumar, Manjula Vijayakumar and newcomer Zeenat, with Rajeev, Jeeva and Chinni Jayanth in supporting roles. It was released on 14 January 1994.

== Plot ==
Balu (Vijayakumar) and Padma (Manjula Vijayakumar) are a happily married couple and they have a teenage daughter Manju (Zeenat). One day, Manju receives a love letter from an unknown person. Balu hates love and wants to punish the letter sender. Her parents take the help of their neighbour Shiva (Sivakumar) to find the anonymous lover. Shiva is married to Sukanya (Jeeva) and they have a little boy (Master Vijay). What transpires later forms the crux of the story.

== Cast ==
- Sivakumar as Shiva
- Vijayakumar as Balu
- Manjula Vijayakumar as Padma
- Zeenat as Manju
- Rajeev as Inspector Dhayalan
- Jeeva as Sukanya
- Chinni Jayanth as Rangu
- Loose Mohan
- Oru Viral Krishna Rao
- Lakshmi
- Pratibha
- Sasi as Raja
- Master Vijay

== Soundtrack ==
The soundtrack was composed by Manoj Saran, with lyrics written by Vairamuthu, Muthulingam and Vijayachandran.

Song	Singer(s)	Duration
"Rani Vani Varungadi"	Swarnalatha, Chorus	4:29
"Sungangal Sorgathil"	S. P. Balasubrahmanyam, Uma Ramanan	5:04
"Then Sindhum Neram"	K. S. Chithra, Chorus	4:23
"Vangaiya Vanga"	S. P. Balasubrahmanyam, Chorus	4:49
"Vayasu Alla"	S. P. Balasubrahmanyam	5:21

== Reception ==
The film was released on 14 January 1994 alongside other Pongal releases such as Mahanadhi, Sethupathi IPS, Amaidhi Padai, Rajakumaran, Veetla Visheshanga and Sindhu Nathi Poo. Malini Mannath of The Indian Express wrote, "The story is a little different (Gita) and for a first film is to the director's credit that he has tried out something different in the scenes he has incorporated in the screenplay. But of course it is his first work and it shows".
