= Pillaiyo Pillai =

1972 film by Krishnan–Panju

- Theatrical poster
- Directed by: Krishnan–Panju
- Written by: M. Karunanidhi
- Produced by: Murasoli Maran
- Starring: M. K. Muthu; Vijayakumari; Lakshmi
- Cinematography: Amritham
- Music by: M. S. Viswanathan
- Production company: Anjugam Pictures
- Release date: 23 June 1972
- Running time: 125 minutes
- Country: India
- Language: Tamil

Pillaiyo Pillai (transl. Son, oh son!) is 1972 Indian Tamil-language romantic drama film directed by Krishnan–Panju, produced by Murasoli Maran and written by M. Karunanidhi. The film stars M. K. Muthu (in dual role) in his debut film appearance alongside Vijayakumari and Lakshmi, while Manohar, M. R. R. Vasu and G. Sakunthala play supporting roles. It was released on 23 June 1972 and was a commercial success.

== Plot ==
Gangatharan is a notorious criminal and womaniser who maintains a facade of respectability in public. Behind this image, he is involved in the theft of valuable temple sculptures. In a ruthless act, he murders his first wife and frames his loyal servant, Murugan, who is subsequently arrested.

Murugan later escapes from prison and, in an act of revenge, kidnaps Gangatharan’s young son. He raises the boy, Kumar, as his own. Meanwhile, Gangatharan marries a woman named Kanchana, whom Murugan also kidnaps. However, he releases her upon learning that she is pregnant. When Gangatharan discovers her condition, he cruelly drives her away. Kanchana gives birth to a son, Kannan, and raises him on her own.

Years later, Kumar becomes a doctor, while Kannan grows up to be an honest and hardworking man. Complications arise when the daughter of a public prosecutor falls in love with one of them—often confusing Kannan for Kumar due to their similar upbringing.

Gangatharan, still driven by vengeance and manipulation, falsely accuses Kumar of theft and assaults him. The ensuing events uncover long-buried secrets and lead to the resolution of misunderstandings, as justice and truth gradually come to light.

== Cast ==
- M. K. Muthu as Kumar and Kannan
- Vijayakumari as Kanchana
- Lakshmi as the public prosecutor's daughter
- Manohar as Gangatharan
- M. R. R. Vasu as Murugan
- G. Sakunthala as Gangatharan's first wife
- V. K. Ramasamy
- Nagesh

== Production ==
Pillaiyo Pillai is the debut film for M. K. Muthu as an actor. Principal photography began on 21 October 1971.

== Soundtrack ==
Music was by M. S. Viswanathan and lyrics were written by Kannadasan and Vaali. The song "Moondru Thamizh Thondriyathum" is set in the Carnatic raga known as Charukesi.

| Songs | Singers | Lyrics | Length |
|---|---|---|---|
| "Ezhaiyin Sirippil Iraivan" | T. M. Soundararajan | Vaali | 04:19 |
| "Moondru Thamizh Thondriyathum" | T. M. Soundararajan, P. Susheela | Vaali | 04:14 |
| "Vellai Malaril Oru Vandu" | P. Susheela | Kannadasan | 03:17 |
| "Gundooru Hamumanthappa Enga" | T. M. Soundararajan, A. L. Raghavan, L. R. Eswari | Vaali | 04:21 |
| "Meenattam Kann Konda Meenakshi" | T. M. Soundararajan, P. Susheela | Vaali | 05:01 |

== Release ==
Pillaiyo Pillai was released on 23 June 1972, and emerged a commercial success.
