= Anadhai Anandhan =

1970 film

- Poster
- Directed by: Krishnan–Panju
- Written by: V. C. Guhanathan
- Produced by: P. K. V. Sankaran; Aarumugam; A.V. Meiyappan
- Starring: A. V. M. Rajan; Jayalalithaa
- Cinematography: S. Maruti Rao
- Edited by: O. Narasimhan
- Music by: K. V. Mahadevan
- Production company: Muthuvel Movies
- Distributed by: AVM Productions
- Release date: 4 September 1970
- Running time: 155 minutes
- Country: India
- Language: Tamil

Anadhai Anandhan (/ənɑːðaɪ ɑːnənðən/ transl. Orphaned Anandhan) is a 1970 Indian Tamil-language film directed by Krishnan–Panju and jointly produced by Muthuvel Movies alongwith AVM Productions. It stars A. V. M. Rajan, Muthuraman, R. S. Manohar and Anjali Devi. The bond between the lead heroine Jayalalithaa with the orphaned child played by Master Sekhar was the highlight of the film. The film was simultaneously made in Hindi as Chanda Aur Bijli, directed by Atma Ram, which was released earlier in 1969. It was a successful film on its release. This film was dubbed in Telugu as Akka Thamudu in 1972.

== Cast ==
- A. V. M. Rajan
- Jayalalithaa
- Nagesh
- Master Sekhar
- R. S. Manohar
- R. Muthuraman
- Anjali Devi
- Jayakumari
- T. K. Bagavathi
- O. A. K. Thevar
- Thengai Srinivasan
- Pakoda Kadhar
- Master Prabhakar
- Vijaya Chandrika
- Renuka

== Soundtrack ==
The music was composed by K. V. Mahadevan, with lyrics by Kannadasan.

The tune of the song 'Kannadi Munnadi Thalladi' was later adapted by R. D. Burman for the Hindi song 'Ab Jo Mile Hai To' in the 1972 film Caravan.

Song	Singers	Length
"Alaithavar Kuralukku"	Sirkazhi Govindarajan	04:05
"Ulagam Pollatha"	P. Susheela	03:54
"Nanainthal Nanaiyatume"	P. Susheela	04:04
"Summa Irungale Konjam"	T. M. Soundararajan, P. Susheela	01:55
"Jammunnu Vanthigo"	P. Susheela	04:16
"Ingu Paarpathai"	L. R. Eswari	04:10
"Kannadi Munnadi Thalladi"	T. M. Soundararajan, P. Susheela	04:06

== Release ==
Anadhai Anandhan was released on 4 September 1970, and emerged a commercial success.
