= Samudram (1977 film) =

- Directed by: K. Sukumaran Nair
- Written by: K. Sukumaran Nair; M. R. Joseph (dialogues)
- Screenplay by: M. R. Joseph
- Starring: Prem Nazir; Sheela; Jayabharathi; Adoor Bhasi
- Cinematography: M. C. Sekhar
- Edited by: M. S. Mani
- Music by: G. Devarajan
- Production company: Suvarna Arts
- Distributed by: Suvarna Arts
- Release date: 10 November 1977
- Country: India
- Language: Malayalam

Samudram (transl. Ocean) is a 1977 Indian Malayalam-language film directed by K. Sukumaran Nair. The film stars Prem Nazir, Sheela, Jayabharathi and Adoor Bhasi. The film has musical score by G. Devarajan.

== Cast ==
- Prem Nazir as Rajashekharan
- Sheela as Omana
- Jayabharathi as Shobhana
- Adoor Bhasi as Eswara Pillai
- Thikkurissy Sukumaran Nair as principal
- Jose as Ravi
- Sreelatha Namboothiri as Vilasini
- T. R. Omana
- Baby Sumathi
- Bahadoor as Shekhar Das
- Prathapachandran as Omana's father
- Ravikumar as Mohan
- T. P. Madhavan as police officer
- Vanchiyoor Radha
- Master Sekhar
- Baby Indira

== Soundtrack ==
The music was composed by G. Devarajan and the lyrics were written by Yusufali Kechery.

No.	Song	Singers	Lyrics	Length (m:ss)
1	"Aayiram Kannukal"	K. J. Yesudas	Yusufali Kechery	
2	"Ding Dong"			
3	"Ezhu Swarangal"	P. Jayachandran, P. Madhuri, Chorus, Jolly Abraham	Yusufali Kechery	
4	"Kalyaanaraathriyil"	P. Madhuri, B. Vasantha, Latha Raju	Yusufali Kechery	
5	"Sangeetha Devathe"	P. Madhuri	Yusufali Kechery	
