= Bhamidipati Radhakrishna =

Playwright

- Born: 14 November 1929
- Died: 4 September 2007 (aged 77); Rajahmundry, Andhra Pradesh
- Occupations: writer, playwright

Bhamidipati Radhakrishna (14 November 1929 – 4 September 2007) was an Indian playwright and scriptwriter in Telugu cinema. He is the son of Hasya Brahma Bhamidipati Kameswara Rao.

== Works ==
He has written some plays and playlets. His play "Taram - Antaram" was staged at World Telugu Conference, Bangalore.

He has written stories for over 150 Telugu films including Brahmachari, Kathanayakudu, Vichitra Kutumbam, Palleturi Bava, Govula Gopanna, Nari Nari Naduma Murari, College Bullodu.

He died at the age of 79 years in Rajahmundry.

== Literary works ==
- Bhajantreelu (play)
- Danta Vedantam (play)
- Keerti Seshulu (play)
- Manasthathwalu (play)
- Taram - Antaram (play)

== Filmography ==
1. Aatma Gowravam (1965)
2. Govula Gopanna (1968)
3. Thalli Prema (1968)
4. Kathanayakudu (1969 film) (1969)
5. Rangeli Raja (1971)
6. Samsaram (1975)
7. Eduruleni Manishi (1975)
8. Alludochhadu (1976)
9. Bhale Dongalu (1976)
10. Sahasavanthudu (1978)
11. Shokilla Rayudu (1979)
12. Nanna Rosha Nooru Varusha (1980)
13. College Bullodu (1990)
14. Iddaru Iddare (1990)

== Awards ==
- He has received the Jandhyala Memorial Award.
