= Football Champion =

- Directed by: A. B. Raj
- Written by: V. Devan; S. L. Puram Sadanandan (dialogues)
- Produced by: T. E. Vasudevan
- Starring: Prem Nazir; Sujatha; Sankaradi; Adoor Bhasi; Jayakumari
- Cinematography: P. Dathu
- Edited by: B. S. Mani
- Music by: V. Dakshinamoorthy
- Production company: Jaya Maruthi
- Distributed by: Jaya Maruthi
- Release date: 25 December 1973
- Country: India
- Language: Malayalam

Football Champion is a 1973 Indian Malayalam-language sports film produced by T. E. Vasudevan under the banner of Jaya Maruthi, directed by A. B. Raj and written by V. Devan. The film stars Prem Nazir, Sujatha, Jayakumari, K. P. Ummer, Adoor Bhasi and Innocent in the lead roles. The film has musical score by V. Dakshinamoorthy.

== Cast ==
- Prem Nazir as Vijayan/Veera Swami (Double Role)
- Sujatha as Thulasi
- Innocent as Football Player
- Adoor Bhasi as KPK Nair
- Sankaradi as Coach Pilla
- T. R. Omana
- Paul Vengola
- Alummoodan as Mathachan Muthalali
- G. K. Pillai
- Jayakumari
- K. P. Ummer as Ravi
- Paravoor Bharathan as Roti Raman Pillai
- Thodupuzha Radhakrishnan
- Seema

== Soundtrack ==
The music was composed by V. Dakshinamoorthy and the lyrics were written by Sreekumaran Thampi.

No.	Song	Singers	Lyrics	Length (m:ss)
1	"Gopeechandanakkuri"	K. J. Yesudas	Sreekumaran Thampi	
2	"Kaikottikali"	P. Leela, Chorus	Sreekumaran Thampi	
3	"Madhyaahna Velayil"	P. Susheela	Sreekumaran Thampi	
4	"Naadaswarakkacheri"	Ambalappuzha Brothers	Sreekumaran Thampi	
5	"Pathinezho Pathinetto"	S. Janaki, Chorus	Sreekumaran Thampi	
6	"Sathyadevanu Maranamundo"	K. J. Yesudas, Chorus	Sreekumaran Thampi	
