= Pookkari =

1973 film by Krishnan–Panju

- Theatrical release poster
- Directed by: Krishnan–Panju
- Written by: T. N. Balu
- Starring: M. K. Muthu; Manjula; Nirmala
- Cinematography: Amritham
- Edited by: Panju
- Music by: M. S. Viswanathan
- Production company: Anjugam Pictures
- Release date: 25 October 1973
- Country: India
- Language: Tamil

Pookkari (/puːkkɑːri/ transl. Flower Selling Girl) is a 1973 Indian Tamil-language film directed by Krishnan–Panju and produced by Anjugam Pictures. The film stars M. K. Muthu, Manjula and Nirmala, with Jayachitra, Jayakumari, V. K. Ramasamy, S. V. Subbaiah and Ambareesh (credited as Amarnath) in supporting roles. It was released on 25 October 1973, and failed commercially. Despite this, in 1978 the film was remade in Kannada as Halli Haida directed by Amirtham, cinematographer of the original with Ambareesh reprising his role.

== Plot ==
Valli is a flower seller and her brother Murugesan is a real estate broker. One day, Valli meets Kanthan and they fall in love. Meanwhile, there is a wealthy man with a daughter, Shyamala. He has a nephew Ravi who is a womaniser. Although Ravi has a mistress, he is also after Muthu's sister, Dhanam, who he eventually rapes. Traumatised by the incident, she loses her voice.

Ravi and Kanthan fight frequently, but during one such incident, Dhanam pleads with Kanthan to spare Ravi. During that incident, she also regains her voice and Ravi agrees to marry her. Upon realising this, Ravi's mistress plans to go to the wedding hall in disguise, with a hidden gun, and shoot Ravi dead. Shyamala learns of the mistress' plans and rushes to save Ravi, but Valli takes the bullet instead. Before dying, she manages to unite Shyamala and Kanthan. Ravi and Dhanam marry.

== Cast ==
As per the opening credits:

- M. K. Muthu as Kanthan
- Manjula as Valli
- Nirmala as Shyamala
- Jayakumari as Ravi's mistress
- Jayachitra as Dhanam
- Sriranjani as Kanthan's mother
- V. K. Ramasamy as Shyamala's father
- S. V. Subbaiah as Kanthan's father
- Moorthy as Velu
- Thengai Srinivasan as Murugesan
- Amarnath as Ravi
- O. A. K. Thevar as Murugesan's elder brother
- Senthamarai as Moneylender

== Production ==
Pookkari was directed by the duo Krishnan–Panju, and produced under the banner Anjugam Pictures. Panju edited the film under the pseudonym "Panjabi". It was photographed by Amritham, a relative of politician and screenwriter M. Karunanidhi. The story and dialogue were written by T. N. Balu. The scene where Muthu sings at a club was shot at Mysore Premier Studios.

== Soundtrack ==
The soundtrack was composed by M. S. Viswanathan. The song "Kaadhalin Pon Veedhiyil", written by Panchu Arunachalam and sung by T. M. Soundararajan and S. Janaki, attained popularity.

Track listing
| No. | Title | Lyrics | Singer(s) | Length |
|---|---|---|---|---|
| 1. | "Kaadhalin Pon Veedhiyil" | Panchu Arunachalam | S. Janaki, T. M. Soundararajan |
| 2. | "Muppathu Paisa" | Vaali | L. R. Eswari |
| 3. | "Muththuppal Sirippennavo" | Vaali | P. Susheela, T. M. Soundararajan |

== Release and reception ==
Pookkari was released on 25 October 1973, and failed commercially. Kalki criticised the film for being anti-progressive towards Tamil cinema but praised some of the cast performances. Navamani praised the acting, cinematography, music, dialogues and direction.
