= Nanna Rosha Nooru Varusha =

- Directed by: Joe Simon
- Written by: R. N. Jayagopal (dialogues)
- Screenplay by: Doondi
- Story by: Bhamidipati Radhakrishna
- Starring: Vishnuvardhan; Padmapriya; Hema Choudhary; Nagesh; K. S. Ashwath
- Cinematography: H. G. Raju
- Edited by: P. Venkateshwara Rao
- Music by: Satyam
- Production company: Sri Karnataka Films
- Distributed by: Sri Karnataka Films
- Release date: 13 February 1980
- Running time: 136 minutes
- Country: India
- Language: Kannada

Nanna Rosha Nooru Varusha (My Rage is a Hundred Years) is a 1980 Indian Kannada-language film, directed by Joe Simon. The film stars Vishnuvardhan, Padmapriya, Hema Chowdhary, Nagesh and K. S. Ashwath.

== Cast ==
- Vishnuvardhan as Anand
- Padmapriya as Sudha
- Jai Jagadish as Inspector Diwakar
- Hema Choudhary as Kalyani
- Dinesh as Balaramayya Sudha and Manju's father
- Leelavathi as Shanthi, Balaramayya's wife
- K. S. Ashwath as Raamu Varma Heggade
- Ramakrishna as Manjunath
- Shakti Prasad as Phaniyappa Mesthri
- Tiger Prabhakar as Govinda Mestri's brother
- Chethan Ramarao as Ranganna
- Uma Shivakumar
- Shyamala as Sharada, a school teacher and Ranganna's daughter
- Shanthamma
- Rajanand as Seth
- Anantharam Maccheri
- Hanumanthachari
- Ashwath Narayan as servant
- Thipatur Siddaramaiah
- Thay Nagesh
