= Palanivel =

Palanivel பழனிவேல்
- Pronunciation: Paḻaṉivēl
- Gender: Male
- Language: Tamil

Origin
- Meaning: Vel of Palani
- Region of origin: Southern India; North-eastern Sri Lanka

Other names
- Alternative spelling: Palanivelu
- Derived: Murugan
- Related names: Ganavel; Rajavel; Thangavel; Vetrivel; Veeravel

Palanivel (Tamil: பழனிவேல், romanized: Paḻaṉivēl) or Palanivelu (Tamil: பழனிவேல்லு, romanized: Paḻaṉivēlu) is a Tamil male given name. Due to the Tamil tradition of using patronymic surnames it may also be a surname for males and females.

Notable people with the name include:

- P. T. R. Palanivel Rajan (1932–2006), Indian politician
  - Palanivel Thiagarajan (born 1966), his son, Indian politician
- G. Palanivel (born 1949), Malaysian politician and government minister
- Haridwaramangalam A. K. Palanivel (born 1948), Indian percussionist
- N. Palanivel, Indian politician in the 1970s and 1980s
