= Nootrukku Nooru =

1971 film by K. Balachander

- Poster
- Directed by: K. Balachander
- Written by: K. Balachander
- Produced by: N. Selvaraj; B. Duraisamy; N. Krishnan; V. Govindarajan
- Starring: Jaishankar; Lakshmi
- Cinematography: N. Balakrishnan
- Edited by: N. R. Kittu
- Music by: V. Kumar
- Production company: Kalakendra Movies
- Release date: 19 March 1971
- Country: India
- Language: Tamil

Nootrukku Nooru (transl. One Hundred out of One Hundred) is a 1971 Indian Tamil-language psychological thriller film directed and written by K. Balachander. The film stars Jaishankar and Lakshmi, with Jayakumari, Vijaya Lalitha and Srividya in other pivotal roles. It is about a college professor who is accused by three girls of sexual harassment, just before his marriage.

Nootrukku Nooru was released on 19 March 1971. The film was remade in Hindi as Imtihan (1974).

== Plot ==
A reputed college professor is accused of sexual harassment by three women including his students and his neighbor. His fiancée sets out to investigate the truth behind the accusations.

== Cast ==
- Jaishankar as Prakash
- Lakshmi as Lakshmi
- Nagesh as Ramesh
- Srividya as Manjula
- Vijaya Lalitha as Stella
- Jayakumari as Kousalya
- Gemini Ganesan as the college principal (guest appearance)
- R. S. Manohar as Manjula's father
- Srikanth as Raja
- V. Gopalakrishnan as Robert
- V. S. Raghavan as David
- Y. G. Mahendran as Mahesh
- S. V. Sahasranamam as Lakshmi's father
- S. N. Lakshmi as Lakshmi's mother
- Sukumari as Manjula's mother
- Neelu as College Lecturer
- Jayanthi as Vimala's mother (guest appearance)

== Production ==
Although Jaishankar was previously known mainly for his action-oriented roles, Balachander saw potential in him for other roles and cast him in Nootrukku Nooru.

== Soundtrack ==
The music was composed by V. Kumar, with lyrics by Vaali. The song "Naan Unnai" was remixed by Thaman S in Kanna Laddu Thinna Aasaiya (2013).

Song	Singers	Length
"Ungalil Oruvan Naan"	T. M. Soundararajan	03:59
"Naan Unnai Vaazhthi"	P. Susheela	04:24
"Nitham Nithamoru"	T. M. Soundararajan	03:27
"Uzhaipukku Silaper"	T. M. Soundararajan	01:15
"Boologama?"	Sirkazhi Govindarajan, L. R. Eswari	06:42

== Accolades ==
Jaishankar won the Film Fans' Association Best Actor Award. Balachander won the Chennai Film Fans' Association awards for Best Director and Best Story.
