= Rangeli Raja =

- Theatrical release poster
- Directed by: C. S. Rao
- Written by: Bhamidipati Radhakrishna (dialogues)
- Screenplay by: C. S. Rao
- Story by: A. K. Velan
- Produced by: Lakshmi Rajyam; Sridhar Rao; Sundarlal Nehata (Presents)
- Starring: Akkineni Nageswara Rao; Kanchana
- Cinematography: Kamal Ghosh
- Edited by: S. P. S. Veerappa
- Music by: Ghantasala
- Production company: Rajyam Productions
- Distributed by: Rajasri Pictures
- Release date: 17 December 1971
- Running time: 168 mins
- Country: India
- Language: Telugu

Rangeli Raja is a 1971 Telugu-language, action-drama film, produced by C. Lakshmi Rajyam, C. Sridhar Rao, and Sundarlal Nehata under the Rajyam Productions banner. and directed by C. S. Rao It stars Akkineni Nageswara Rao & Kanchana, and its music was composed by Ghantasala.

== Cast ==
- Akkineni Nageswara Rao as Raja
- Kanchana as Vijaya
- S. V. Ranga Rao as Raobahadur Jaganatha Rao (Photo)
- Gummadi as Ramadasu / Hanumantha Rao
- Satyanarayana as Kumar
- Mukkamala as Narasimham
- Allu Ramalingaiah as Kailasam
- Chalam as Chandram
- Chalapathi Rao as C.I.D / Dadhel Khan
- Lakshmi Rajyam as Parvathamma
- Vandana as Jaya
- Jayakumari as Gowri
- Jhansi as Lakshmi

== Crew ==
- Art: G. V. Subba Rao
- Choreography: Chinni-Sampath
- Stills: Satyam
- Fights: Raghavulu
- Dialogues: Bhamidipati Radhakrishna
- Lyrics: C. Narayana Reddy, Dasarathi, Arudra, Kosaraju
- Playback: Ghantasala, P. Susheela, L. R. Eswari, Vasantha
- Music: Ghantasala
- Story: A. K. Velan
- Editing: S. P. S. Veerappa
- Cinematography: Kamal Ghosh
- Presenter: Sunderlal Nahata
- Producers: Sridhara Rao, Lakshmi Rajyam
- Director: C. S. Rao
- Banner: Rajyam Productions
- Release Date: 17 December 1971

== Soundtrack ==
Rangeli Raja

Film score by Ghantasala
- Released: 1971
- Genre: Soundtrack
- Length: 22:09
- Producer: Ghantasala

S. No.	Song title	Lyrics	Singers	length
1	"Om Sahanaavavathu"	C. Narayana Reddy	Ghantasala	5:50
2	"Challani Gaaliki"	Dasarathi	Ghantasala, L. R. Eeswari	3:12
3	"Asalina Muddugummaro"	Kosaraju	L. R. Eswari	3:20
4	"Darling Darling"	Arudra	Ghantasala	2:59
5	"Ilaati Roju Malli"	Dasarathi	Ghantasala	3:14
6	"Mastaru Master"	Arudra	P. Susheela	3:34
