= College Bullodu =

- Theatrical release poster
- Directed by: Sarath
- Written by: Satyanand (dialogues)
- Screenplay by: Bhamidipati Radhakrishna
- Story by: B. Venkatrao
- Produced by: P. Balaram
- Starring: Akkineni Nageswara Rao; Radhika; Harish
- Cinematography: Y. Maheedhar
- Edited by: Murali-Ramayya
- Music by: Raj–Koti
- Production company: Sri Anupama Productions
- Release date: 2 July 1992
- Running time: 123 minutes
- Country: India
- Language: Telugu

College Bullodu (transl. College boy) is a 1992 Telugu-language comedy film directed by Sarath. The film stars Akkineni Nageswara Rao, Radhika, Harish, with music composed by Raj–Koti. It is produced by P. Balaram under Sri Anupama Productions. The film was notable for Nageswara Rao, at 67, playing a college student.

== Cast ==
- Akkineni Nageswara Rao as Gopala Krishna
- Radhika as Saraswathi
- Harish as Raja
- Satyanayana as Koteswara Rao
- Brahmanandam as Lecturer Paramanandam
- Babu Mohan as Papayya
- Raj Kumar as Kumar
- Ali as Babu
- Tanikella Bharani as Bairaagi
- Narra Venkateswara Rao as Chenchuramayya
- Telephone Satyanarayana as Principal
- Bhimeswara Rao as Prakash Rao
- K.K.Sarma as Librarian Ganapathi
- Sarathi as Inspector
- Chidatala Appa Rao as Appa Rao
- Dham as Priest
- Yamuna as Sobha
- Jeenath as Latha
- Athili Lakshmi as Saraswathi's mother
- Kalpana Rai as Sundari's aunt
- Disco Shanti as item number
- Y. Vijaya as Sundari

== Music ==
Music was composed by Raj–Koti. Lyrics were written by Veturi.

Track listing
No.	Title	Singer(s)	Length
1.	"Andama Ila Anduma"	S. P. Balasubrahmanyam, Chitra	4:32
2.	"Chama Chama Chama"	S. P. Balasubrahmanyam, Chitra	5:04
3.	"Ento Madhuramee Jeevitam"	S. P. Balasubrahmanyam	4:49
4.	"Ragging Aata"	S. P. Balasubrahmanyam, Chitra	4:51
5.	"Emi Haayile"	S. P. Balasubrahmanyam, Chitra	4:44
Total length:			24:00
