= Rickshawala =

1973 film by K. Shankar

- Poster
- Directed by: K. Shankar
- Written by: Akhtar Roomani (dialogue); K. A. Narayan(screenplay)
- Story by: R. M. Veerappan
- Based on: Rickshawkaran by R. M. Veerappan
- Produced by: R. M. Veerappan
- Starring: Randhir Kapoor; Neetu Singh; Mala Sinha; Pran
- Cinematography: Marcus Bartley
- Edited by: K. Shankar
- Music by: R. D. Burman
- Production company: Sathya Movies
- Release date: 24 August 1973
- Country: India
- Language: Hindi

Rickshawala (transl. The Rickshaw Man) is a 1973 Indian Hindi-language film starring Randhir Kapoor, Neetu Singh and Mala Sinha and directed by K. Shankar and Produced by R M Veerappan under his noted Sathya Movies banner. It was Neetu Singh's first film in lead role. It was remake of the 1971 Tamil film Rickshawkaran.

== Cast ==
- Randhir Kapoor as Gopi
- Neetu Singh as Kiran
- Mala Sinha as Parvati
- Pran as Kailash
- Mohan Choti as Kabira Rickshaw driver
- Anwar Hussain as Madan
- Ranjeet as Murli
- Sujit Kumar as Manohar
- Lalita Desai (alias Ashoo) as Shanti
- Sunder as Chacha
- Poornam Viswanathan as Chief Justice

== Production ==
Rickshawala is a remake of the 1971 Tamil film Rickshawkaran, and was Neetu Singh's first film as the lead heroine. The scene of Madras cycle rickshaw race was shot in Anna Nagar area of Madras (now Chennai).

== Soundtrack ==
The song 'Rampur ka vasi hoon main' is played by the band in wedding procession scene. This song is originally picturized on Randhir Kapoor, in the film 'Rampur ka Laxman (1972), music by RD Burman'

In another scene, the soundtrack of another RD Burman song 'Dum maro Dum' is played.

Song	Singer
"Kai Tarah Ki Hansi Hoti Hai"	Kishore Kumar
"Maine Kaha Zid Chhod De, Dupatta Mod De Besharam"	Kishore Kumar, Lata Mangeshkar
"Phoolon Ki Duniya Se, Taron Ki Duniya Mein"	Kishore Kumar, Asha Bhosle
"Main Ghazab Ki Cheez Hoon"	Asha Bhosle
"Main Haseen Hoon"	Asha Bhosle

== Reception ==
Unlike the Tamil original, the remake was a flop.
