= Vaade Veedu =

- Theatrical release poster
- Directed by: D. Yoganand
- Written by: D.V.Narasa Raju
- Produced by: N. Ramabrahmam
- Starring: N. T. Rama Rao; Manjula
- Cinematography: S. S. Lal
- Edited by: B. Kandaswamy
- Music by: Satyam
- Production company: Sri Gowthami Pictures
- Release date: 18 October 1973
- Running time: 164 mins
- Country: India
- Language: Telugu

Vaade Veedu (transl. This Man is That Man only) is a 1973 Indian Telugu-language comedy drama film, produced by N. Ramabrahmam under the Sri Gowthami Pictures banner and directed by D. Yoganand. It stars N. T. Rama Rao and Manjula, with music composed by Satyam.

== Cast ==
- N.T.Rama Rao as Rambabu / Kondadu
- Manjula as Savitri
- Krishnam Raju as Shankar
- Nagabhushanam as Kodandam
- Padmanabham as Bheemudu
- Allu Ramalingaiah as Sidhanthi
- Mikkilineni as Zamindar Jaganatha Rao
- Ramana Reddy
- Chalapathi Rao as C.B.I.Officer
- KK Sarma
- Pandari Bai as Shantamma
- Hemalatha as Lakshmi
- Sandhya Rani as Sundari
- Leela Rani as Seeta

== Soundtrack ==
Vaade Veedu

Film score by Satyam
- Released: 1973
- Genre: Soundtrack
- Length: 33:18
- Producer: Satyam

Satyam chronology
Nenu Naa Desam (1973)	Vaade Veedu (1973)	Ramude Devudhu (1973)

Music composed by Satyam.

S. No.	Song title	Lyrics	Singers	length
1	"Atu Challani Vennela"	Dasaradhi	Ghantasala, P. Susheela	4:22
2	"Cheeraleni Chinnadana"	C. Narayana Reddy	Ghantasala, Ramola	4:25
3	"Edhutanunchi Kadhalanu"	Devulapalli	P. Susheela	4:00
4	"Netiki Mallee Maaintlo"	Devulapalli	Ghantasala, P. Susheela, S. Janaki	3:33
5	"Vayase Oka Paatham"	C. Narayana Reddy	Ghantasala, P. Susheela	4:27
6	"Yemkavaloi Neeku"	Kosaraju	S. Janaki	4:30
7	"Lovelone Undhi"	Kosaraju	S. P. Balasubrahmanyam, Vasantha	3:47
8	"Hare Raama Aagandi"	Kosaraju	S. P. Balasubrahmanyam, Vasantha	4:14
