= Jayakumari =

Indian actress

- Occupation: Actor
- Years active: 1960-1982

Jayakumari is an Indian actress in South Indian films. She was born in 1952 and was a prominent lead actress during the 1960s and 1970s in Tamil and Malayalam films. She was noted for her glamorous roles. She has acted in around 50 Malayalam movies. She hails from Chennai, Tamil Nadu. She made her debut through 1968 Malayalam movie Collector Malathi. She had acted opposite famous actors like Prem Nazir in Football Champion, Jaishankar in Nootrukku Nooru and Dr. Rajkumar in Mannina Maga . She acted more than 200 films in variety roles.

== Partial filmography ==
This list is incomplete, you may expand it

=== Tamil ===
- Nadodi (1966) - Debut in Tamil
- Chakkaram (1968)
- Sathiyam Thavaradhey (1968)
- CID Shankar (1970)
- Engirundho Vandhaal (1970)
- Patham Pasali (1970)
- Anadhai Anandhan (1970)
- Maanavan (1970)
- Thabalkaran Thangai (1970)
- Maanavan (1970)
- Malathi (1970)
- Meendum Vazhven (1971)
- Nootrukku Nooru (1971)
- Kettikaran (1971)
- Rickshawkaran (1971)
- Arunodhayam (1971)
- Thriumagal (1971)
- Kasethan Kadavulada (1972)
- Kannamma (1972)
- Varaverpu (1972)
- Bathilukku Bathil (1972)
- Ganga (1972)
- Gauravam (1973) as Kalpana
- Thedi Vandha Lakshmi (1973) as Pattuma
- Amman Arul (1973)
- Ponvandu (1973)
- Pookkari (1973)
- Maanikka Thottil (1974)
- Kalyanamam Kalyanam (1974)
- Idhayam Parkiradhu (1974)
- Pandhattam (1974)
- Vairam (1974)
- Pinju Manam (1975)
- Thiyaga Ullam (1975)
- Chitra Pournami (1976)
- Ival Oru Seethai (1978)
- Mullum Malarum (1978)
- Thunaivi (1982)

=== Malayalam ===
- Kanalkattakal (1978)
- Yakshagaanam (1976)
- Kalyana Sougandhikam (1975)
- Chattambikkalyaani (1975) as Devi
- Rahasyaraathri (1974)
- Bhoomidevi Pushpiniyaayi (1974)
- Nadeenadanmaare Aavasyamundu (1974)
- Panchathanthram (1974)
- Football Champion (1973)
- Nrithasaala (1972)
- Kandavarundo (1972)
- Naadan Premam (1972)
- Agnimrigam (1971)
- Rathri Vandi (1971)
- Collector Malathi (1967)

=== Telugu ===
- Bala Mitrula Katha (1972)
- Manavudu Danavudu (1972)
- Sampoorna Ramayanam (1971)
- Kalyana Mandapam (1971)
- Rangeli Raja (1971) as Gowri
- Inti Gowravam (1970)

=== Kannada ===
- Makkala Rajya (1960) as Uncredited debut in Kannada, child artist
- Mannina Maga (1968)
- Hoovu Mullu (1968)
- Choori Chikkanna (1969)
- Bhale Raja (1969)
- Bhale Bhaskar (1971)
- Kranti Veera (1972)
- Hrudaya Sangama (1972)
- Professor Huchuraya (1974)
- Nanoo Balabeku (1974)
- Chamundeshwari Mahime (1974)
- Bangalore Bhootha (1976)
- Bhale Huduga (1978)

=== Hindi ===
- Haathi Mere Saathi (1971)
- Yeh Chor Yeh Lutere (1974)
