= Jebu Donga (1975 film) =

1975 Telugu action film starring Sobhan Babu directed by V. Madhusudhana Rao

- Theatrical Poster
- Directed by: V. Madhusudhana Rao
- Written by: Mullapudi Venkata Ramana (Dialogues)
- Produced by: V. R. Yachendra; K. Chatterjee
- Starring: Sobhan Babu; Manjula Vijayakumar
- Cinematography: S. Venkataratnam
- Music by: Chakravarthy
- Production company: Samatha Arts
- Distributed by: Laxmi Films
- Release date: 14 August 1975
- Country: India
- Language: Telugu

Jebu Donga (transl. Pickpocket) is a 1975 Indian Telugu action film directed by V. Madhusudhana Rao starring Sobhan Babu and Manjula Vijayakumar in the lead roles. The film was released on 14 August 1975.

== Cast ==
- Sobhan Babu as Raja
- Manjula Vijayakumar as Madhavi
- Murali Mohan as Gopi
- Roja Ramani as Radha
- Rao Gopal Rao as S.I. Rangaiah
- Allu ramalingaiha.
- ramaprabha
- Kaikala Satyanarayana as Sesha Rao
- Mandadi Prabhakar Reddy
- P. R. Varalakshmi
- Raja Babu (actor)
- madala ranga rao.

== Soundtrack ==
Jebu Donga

Soundtrack album by K. Chakravarthy
- Released: 1975
- Genre: Telugu Film
- Producer: K. Chakravarthy

S. No	Song title	Singers	length
1	"చల్లంగా ఉండాలి మా రాజులు "	S. P. Balasubrahmanyam	4.03
2	"నీలాల నింగిలో మేఘాల తేరులో "	S. P. Balasubrahmanyam, P. Suseela	4.03
3	"రాధా అందించు నీ లేత పెదవి "	S. P. Balasubrahmanyam, P. Suseela	4.03

== Reception ==
The film collected ₹9 lakhs in its second week, ₹25 lakhs in the first two weeks, ₹6 lakhs in the third week, ₹31 lakhs in the first three weeks and the film's final collection exceeded ₹50 lakhs. It was the second highest-grossing film of the year 1975 behind another Sobhan Babu film, Soggadu.

=== Legacy ===
The title of the film was used for the 1987 Chiranjeevi film Jebu Donga.
