= Gunavanthudu =

1975 Telugu film directed by Adurthi Subba Rao

- Directed by: Adurthi Subba Rao
- Produced by: N. N. Bhatt; N. S. Murthy
- Starring: Sobhan Babu; Manjula; Kantha Rao
- Production company: Sri Vijaya Bhatt Productions
- Release date: 14 November 1975
- Running time: 138 minutes
- Country: India
- Language: Telugu

Gunavanthudu(transl. Virtuous Man) is a 1975 Indian Telugu film directed by Adurthi Subba Rao starring Sobhan Babu, Manjula, Kantha Rao and Anjali Devi in the lead roles. The film was released on 14 November 1975.

== Cast ==
- Sobhan Babu
- Manjula
- Kantha Rao
- Anjali Devi
- Dhulipala
- Krishna Kumari
- Mada
- Jayamalini
- Prabhakar Reddy

== Reception ==
Gunavantudu had one of the biggest opening for any Telugu film at the time of its release thanks to the huge success of actor Sobhan Babu's previous films released in 1975. The film garnered highly negative reviews from both critics and audience. Yet the film managed to make good profit and was declared a Hit at the box office. It was, however, the lowest grossing Sobhan Babu film of the year 1975.
