= M. K. Muthu =

Indian actor, playback singer and politician (1948–2025)

- Born: Muthuvel Karunanidhi Muthu; 14 January 1948; Thirukuvalai, Madras Province, India (now in Nagapattinam district, Tamil Nadu, India)
- Died: 19 July 2025 (aged 77); Chennai, Tamil Nadu, India
- Occupations: Actor; singer; politician
- Spouse: Sivakamasundari
- Children: 2
- Parent(s): M. Karunanidhi and Padmavathi
- Relatives: Karunanidhi family

Muthuvel Karunanidhi Muthu (14 January 1948 – 19 July 2025) was an Indian actor, playback singer and politician.

== Life and career ==
Muthu was born on 14 January 1948, as the eldest son of former Tamil Nadu chief minister M. Karunanidhi and his first wife, Padmavathi, sister of actor-singer Chidambaram S. Jayaraman. According to the internal evidence provided by Karunanidhi, in the first volume of his autobiography, Muthu's mother died at the age of 20, soon after giving birth to him, as a result of accelerated tuberculosis.

Muthu started acting in 1970 and appeared in films such as Pillaiyo Pillai, Samayalkaran, Anayavilaku, Ingeyum Manidhargal and Pookkari. He also sang a few songs in these films. In 2008, he sang a song for the film Mattuthavani under music director Deva.

Karunanidhi initially wanted Muthu to be his political heir in the early 1970s, but later launched him into films as a counter to M. G. Ramachandran, founder of the AIADMK. However, Muthu's career in film never really took off.

Muthu later had a difference of opinion with Karunanidhi, and he went on to join his father's rival party AIADMK. However both father and son patched up their differences in 2009, after Muthu fell ill. Muthu died on 18 July 2025, at the age of 77.

== Death ==
M. K. Muthu had been unwell for the past two decades and was rarely seen in public. He died on 19 July 2025 at his residence on East Coast Road in Chennai, at the age of 77. He is survived by his daughter, Thenmozhi.

== Filmography ==
| Year | Film | Role | Note |
|---|---|---|---|
| 1972 | Pillaiyo Pillai | Kumar / Kannan | Debut |
| 1973 | Pookkari | Kanthan | |
| 1974 | Samayalkkaran | | |
| 1975 | Anaiya Vilakku | | Also playback singer |
| 1975 | Nambikai Natchathiram | | |
| 1975 | Ingeyum Manithargal | | |
| 1977 | Ellam Avale | | |
| 1977 | Niyaya Tharasu | | |

== Sources ==
- Hardgrave, Robert L. "Politics and the Film in Tamilnadu: The Stars and the DMK." Asian Survey, Vol. 13, No. 3 (Mar., 1973), pp. 288–305
- Divided dynasties The Telegraph, Sunday, 20 May 2007
- M.K Muthu returns to tinselville
