= Sekhar (actor) =

Indian actor

Shekar
- Born: J. V. Sekar; 7 January 1963; Chennai, Tamil Nadu, india
- Died: 8 July 2003 (aged 40); Chennai, Tamil Nadu, India
- Other names: Master Sekar, Master Shekhar
- Occupation: Actor
- Years active: 1968–1988

J. V. Sekhar (7 January 1963 – 8 July 2003), better known as Master Sekhar, was an Indian child actor who predominantly appeared in Tamil and Malayalam films.

== Early life and career ==
Sekhar was born on 7 January 1963. He worked in more than 50 films in four languages (Tamil, Telugu, Malayalam and Kannada). He was introduced to Tamil cinema as a child artist in the 1968 film Kudiyirundha Koyil. He performed in the lead roles in films including Manipayal and Oh Manju. He was famous for his child performance in many movies, and was called Master Sekhar. He played M. G. Ramachandran's character as a child in films including Idhaya Veenai and Kudiyirundha Koyil. He also performed in TV serials. He is the son of cinematographer J.V. Vijayam.

He died on 8 July 2003 in Chennai after falling from the first floor, while supervising the construction work at his house.

== Partial filmography ==
Year	Film	Role	Language	Notes
1968	Kudiyirundha Koyil	Sekhar & Anand	Tamil	
1968	Enga Oor Raja	Young Chakravarthi	Tamil	
1968	Oli Vilakku		Tamil	
1968	Chakkaram		Tamil	
1969	Vaa Raja Vaa		Tamil	
1970	Anadhai Anandhan	Anandhan	Tamil	
1970	Vairagyam		Tamil	
1970	Enga Mama	Gandhi	Tamil	
1970	En Annan	Ranga	Tamil	
1970	Namma Kuzhandaigal		Tamil	
1971	Annai Velankanni	Raasa	Tamil	
1971	Bobanum Moliyum	Boban	Malayalam	
1971	Aabhijathyam		Malayalam	
1972	Aseervatham		Tamil	
1972	Mayiladumkunnu		Malayalam	
1972	Thangadurai		Tamil	
1972	Raja	Young Raja	Tamil	
1972	Akka Thamudu		Telugu	
1972	Agathiyar		Tamil	
1972	Meendum Vazhven	Babu	Tamil	
1972	Annamitta Kai	Durairaj	Tamil	
1972	Idhaya Veenai	Sundharam	Tamil	
1973	Kattila Thottila	Gopi	Tamil	
1973	Sollathaan Ninaikkiren	Kamal's Brother	Tamil	
1973	Rajaraja Cholan	Ponna	Tamil	
1973	Thirumalai Deivam	Venkatesan	Tamil	
1974	Vani Rani		Tamil	
1974	Engamma Sapatham		Tamil	
1974	Manipayal	Ilangovan	Tamil	
1975	Manjal Mugame Varuga		Tamil	
1975	Swami Ayyappan	Ayyappan	Malayalam/Tamil	
1975	Munniravu Neram		Tamil	
1975	Odakkuzhal		Malayalam	
1975	Janaki Sabatham		Tamil	
1976	Oh Manju	Madhu	Tamil	
1976	Payanam	Sekhar	Tamil	
1976	Chottanikkara Amma		Malayalam	
1976	Kumara Vijayam		Tamil	
1976	Mohiniyaattam	Chintu	Malayalam	
1976	Perum Pughazhum	Ravi	Tamil	
1976	Amba Ambika Ambalika	Sree Murukan	Malayalam	
1976	Aayiram Janmangal	Rajan	Malayalam	
1976	Dasavatharam	Bharatha	Tamil	
1977	Samudram		Malayalam	
1978	Beena		Malayalam	
1979	Kavari Maan	Rajesh	Tamil	
1979	Nallathoru Kudumbam		Tamil	
1979	Oru Vidukadhai Oru Thodarkadhai		Tamil	
1979	Neethiyaa Nyayamaa		Tamil	
1979	Anbin Alaigal		Tamil	
1979	Kali Kovil Kabali		Tamil	
1979	Nangooram		Tamil	
1980	Nadhiyai Thedi Vandha Kadal		Tamil	
1982	Thunaivi		Tamil	
1988	Oorai Therinjukithen		Tamil	
1993	Aparna		Malayalam	
