= Vaazhnthu Kaattugiren =

- Poster
- Directed by: Krishnan–Panju
- Screenplay by: Mahendran
- Story by: S. S. Thennarasu
- Produced by: S. S. Karuppusamy; S. S. K. Sanasi; S. S. K. Shankaralingam; S. S. K. Ganesan; S. S. K. Murugan
- Starring: Sujatha; R. Muthuraman; Padmapriya
- Cinematography: S. Maruti Rao
- Edited by: Panjabi
- Music by: M. S. Viswanathan
- Production company: S. S. K. Films
- Release date: 1 November 1975
- Running time: 135 minutes
- Country: India
- Language: Tamil

Vaazhnthu Kaattugiren (transl. I will live and show) is a 1975 Indian Tamil language drama film directed by Krishnan–Panju and produced by S. S. Karuppusamy. The story was written by S. S. Thennarasu. The screenplay and dialogue were written by Mahendran. Music was composed by M. S. Viswanathan. The film stars Sujatha, R. Muthuraman, and Padmapriya, with Srikanth, M. N. Rajam, Manorama, and Suruli Rajan in supporting roles. It was released on 1 November 1975, and became a box office success.

== Cast ==
- Sujatha as Geetha
- R. Muthuraman as Ramanathan
- Padmapriya as Pankajam
- Srikanth as Baskar or Subbha Rao
- M. N. Rajam as Ramanathan's mother
- Manorama as Dollak Sundari
- M. Bhanumathi as Lakshmi Baskar
- Suruli Rajan as Kumarappa
- Radhika as Vanaja
- Vijayachandrika as Rani
- S. Rama Rao (cameo appearance)
- Oru Viral Krishna Rao as Santhanam
- Sivagangai Sedhu Raman as Balaji
- Ennatha Kannaiya as Shanmugam

== Production ==
After the success of Thangappathakkam (1974), Mahendran was approached by S. S. Karuppasamy who gave a letter written by writer S. S. Thennarasu in which he attached a short story and said Karuppasamy expressed interest to produce a film. Karuppasamy chose Krishnan–Panju to handle the direction of the film. Mahendran felt the short story did not fit the film format instead narrated a different plot which impressed them; however Mahendran posed a condition that Thennarasu's name will be credited for story while his name will credited for screenplay and dialogues.

== Soundtrack ==
Music was composed by M. S. Viswanathan, and lyrics were written by Kannadasan.

| Song | Singers | Length |
|---|---|---|
| "Kaveri Nagarinil" | Vani Jairam | 04:39 |
| "Kotti Kidanthathu" | S. P. Balasubrahmanyam, P. Susheela | 04:20 |
| "Yemmi Mynaa Summa Summa" | Manorama | 03:31 |
| "Hello sir, Good" | L. R. Eswari | 05:38 |
| "Kaveri Nagarinil" – 2 | P. Susheela | 04:13 |

== Bibliography ==
- Mahendran (2013) [2004]. சினிமாவும் நானும் [Cinema and I] (in Tamil). Karpagam Publications. OCLC 54777094.
