= Krishnan–Panju =

Indian film directing duo

- Krishnan (left) and Panju (right)
- Born: R. Krishnan: 18 July 1909; S. Panju: 24 January 1915; R. Krishnan: Chennai, Tamil Nadu; S. Panju: Umayalpuram, Kumbakonam, Tamil Nadu
- Died: R. Krishnan: 17 July 1997 (aged 87); S. Panju: 6 April 1984 (aged 69); Chennai, Tamil Nadu, India
- Occupation: Film directors
- Years active: R. Krishnan: 1944–1997; S. Panju: 1944–1984

R. Krishnan (1909–1997) and S. Panju (1915–1984), collectively referred to as Krishnan–Panju, were Indian film directors. The duo directed more than 50 films in South Indian languages and in Hindi.

== Early life ==
R. Krishnan was born on 18 July 1909 in Chennai, Tamil Nadu, India. Previously, he was in charge of the laboratory in Pakshiraja Studios (then known as Kandhan studio) in Coimbatore.

S. Panju was born on 24 January 1915 as Panchapakesan in Umayalpuram near Kumbakonam, Tamil Nadu. Previously, he worked as an assistant editor under P. K. Raja Sandow and as assistant director under Ellis R. Dungan. He was also a film editor who edited films under the name Punjabi or Panjabi.

== Career ==
They both worked for the Tamil film Araichimani or Manuneethi Chozhan (1942), which was directed by P. K. Raja Sandow in Kandhan Studio. Krishnan and Panju became friends at this time. Later, when Raja Sandow saw their skills, he gave them his next project Poompavai. The film Poompavai (1944) was their first directorial venture. In 1947, they directed Paithiyakkaran to support N. S. Krishnan's drama troupe, when he was jailed in the Lakshmikanthan murder case. After his acquittal, N. S. Krishnan also starred in the film. In 1949, they made Nallathambi, inspired by Mr. Deeds Goes to Town, in which C. N. Annadurai, who later became the Chief Minister of Tamil Nadu, debuted as a script writer. In 1952, they made Parasakthi, for which the dialogues were written by M. Karunanidhi, who also later became the Chief Minister of Tamil Nadu. Parasakthi became a cult film in Tamil cinema and influenced the emergence of the Dravida Munnetra Kazhagam, a regional party, as a political force in Tamil Nadu. They also made Hindi films such as Bhabhi and Shaadi. They received the Kalaimamani award in 1960.

== Personal lives ==
Krishnan has sons and daughters, among his sons is film director K. Subash, who died in 2016 at the age of 57.

== Deaths ==
On 6 April 1984, S. Panju died in Chennai. Krishnan did not make any films after Panju's death. On 17 July 1997, Krishnan died in Chennai.

== Filmography ==
As Director

Year	Film	Language	Ref.
1944	Poompavai	Tamil	
1947	Paithiyakkaran	Tamil	
1949	Nallathambi	Tamil	
1949	Ratnakumar	Tamil	
1952	Parasakthi	Tamil	
1953	Kangal	Tamil	
1954	Ratha Kanneer	Tamil	
1955	Santhasakku	Kannada	
1956	Kula Dheivam	Tamil	
1957	Pudhaiyal	Tamil	
1957	Bhabhi	Hindi	
1958	Mamiyar Mechina Marumagal	Tamil	
1959	Barkha	Hindi	
1960	Thilakam	Tamil	
1960	Deivapiravi	Tamil	
1960	Bindiya	Hindi	
1961	Suhag Sindoor	Hindi	
1962	Shaadi	Hindi	
1962	Man-Mauji	Hindi	
1962	Annai	Tamil	
1963	Kunkhumam	Tamil	
1964	Vazhkai Vazhvatharke	Tamil	
1964	Server Sundaram	Tamil	25th Film
1964	Mera Qasoor Kya Hai	Hindi	Bahaar Films, Bombay
1965	Kuzhandaiyum Deivamum	Tamil	
1966	Laadla	Hindi	
1966	Leta Manasulu	Telugu	
1966	Petralthan Pillaiya	Tamil	
1968	Do Kaliyaan	Hindi	
1968	Uyarndha Manithan	Tamil	
1969	Annaiyum Pithavum	Tamil	
1970	Engal Thangam	Tamil	
1970	Anadhai Anandhan	Tamil	
1971	Main Sunder Hoon	Hindi	
1971	Rangarattinam	Tamil	
1972	Pillaiyo Pillai	Tamil	
1972	Idhaya Veenai	Tamil	
1973	Pookkari	Tamil	
1974	Samayalkaran	Tamil	
1974	Shaandaar	Hindi	
1974	Pathu Madha Bandham	Tamil	
1974	Kaliyuga Kannan	Tamil	
1975	Vaazhnthu Kaattugiren	Tamil	
1975	Kashmir Bullodu	Telugu	
1975	Anaya Vilakku	Tamil	
1976	Vazhvu En Pakkam	Tamil	
1977	Sonnathai Seiven	Tamil	
1977	Ilaya Thalaimurai	Tamil	
1977	Enna Thavam Seithan	Tamil	
1977	Chakravarthy	Tamil	
1978	Per Solla Oru Pillai	Tamil	
1978	Annapoorani	Tamil	
1979	Velli Ratham	Tamil	50th Film
1979	Neela Malargal	Tamil	
1979	Nadagame Ulagam	Tamil	
1980	Mangala Nayagi	Tamil	
1980	Malarum Ninaivugal	Tamil	

As Editor (Panju only)

Year	Film	Language	Ref.
1962	Annai	Tamil	
1963	Kunkhumam	Tamil	
1964	Server Sundaram	Tamil	

== Awards ==
- Filmfare Award for Best Film - Tamil - Server Sundaram (1964)
