= Anaiya Vilakku =

- Theatrical release poster
- Directed by: Krishnan–Panju
- Screenplay by: M. Karunanidhi
- Dialogue by: Balu
- Produced by: Selvam
- Starring: M. K. Muthu; Padmapriya
- Cinematography: Amirtham
- Music by: M. S. Viswanathan
- Production company: Anjugam Pictures
- Release date: 15 August 1975
- Country: India
- Language: Tamil

Anaiya Vilakku (transl. Eternal lamp) is a 1975 Indian Tamil-language film directed by Krishnan–Panju and co-written by M. Karunanidhi. The film stars M. K. Muthu and Padmapriya. It was released on 15 August 1975, and failed at the box office.

== Cast ==
- M. K. Muthu
- Padmapriya
- Srikanth
- M. R. R. Vasu
- S. A. Ashokan

== Soundtrack ==
The music was composed by M. S. Viswanathan, with lyrics by Vaali. Muthu sang in his own voice, unlike other Tamil actors of the period.

Track listing
No.	Title	Singer(s)	Length
1.	"Koonpiraiyai Nalla Manathil"	M. K. Muthu	3:20
2.	"Moham Athu Muppathu Naal"	M. K. Muthu, P. Susheela	3:23
3.	"Pillaiyum Killivittu"	M. K. Muthu	3:02
4.	"Dhagam Theerum"	L. R. Eswari	3:18
Total length:			13:03

== Release and reception ==
Anaiya Vilakku was released on 15 August 1975. Kanthan of Kalki gave the film a positive review, praising Vasu's villainy, Krishnan–Panju's direction and Amirtham's cinematography. Naagai Dharuman of Navamani praised the acting of the cast, Balu's dialogues, Amirtham's cinematography and Krishnan–Panju's direction. Despite this, it was not a box office success.
