= Bharago =

Bhamidipati Ramagopalam
- Born: 6 February 1932; Pushpagiri, Vizianagaram, Andhra Pradesh, India
- Died: 7 April 2010; Visakhapatnam, Andhra Pradesh, India
- Occupation: Writer

Bhamidipati Ramagopalam (1932–2010), also known as Bharago, was a writer of short stories, critiques and novels in Telugu. He received the Central Sahitya Academy Award in 1991 for the book Itlu mee vidheyudu.

== Education ==
Ramagopalam had regular schooling from Form III onwards at M.R. Branch College and later graduated with a B.A. in Economics in 1951 from M.R. Degree College, Vizianagaram.

== Adaptations ==
His short stories have been adapted into mini-series in Telugu by Doordarshan.

== Awards ==
- Best humour writer award of Telugu University (1990)
- Central Sahitya Academy Award (1991)
- Kurella Sahithi Award (1994)
- Kalasagara (Chennai) Award (1997)

== Works ==
=== Novels ===
- Kundapenkulu (1961)
- Sparsa Rekha (1984)
- Nakee Udyogam Vaddu (1988)

=== Stories ===
- Vantochina Mogudu (1966)
- Vennela Needa (1997)
- Kadhanakutoohalam (1985)
- Itlu Mee Vidheyudu (1990)
- Sarada and Kulasa Kadhalu (1997)

=== Others ===
- Kalpasootram from Prakrit into Telugu
- 116 Telugu film songs of the period 1942-73 under the name 'Noota padaharlu(2001)'
- Telugu film songs under the name 'Maro Noota padaharlu'(2005)
- Anusthana Bhagavadgeetha (2001)
- Several commemoration volumes (souvenir) which included the ones on great personalities like Dwaram Venkataswamy Naidu, P. Bhanumathi, R. Balasaraswathi Devi, Palagummi Padmaraju, and Raavi Sastry.
- Souvenir on Suseela

=== Biography ===
- ‘Aaramagopalam’ - An autobiography of noted short-story and humour
- Translation of the biography of Asutosh Mukherjee from English into Telugu
