= Manjula Vijayakumar =

Indian actress (1954–2013)

Manjula Vijaykumar
- Born: Manjuladevi; 4 July 1954
- Died: 23 July 2013 (aged 59); Thanjavur, Tamil Nadu, India
- Other names: Manju, Vasanthi
- Occupation: Actress
- Years active: 1969–2002
- Spouse: Vijayakumar (m. 1976)
- Children: Vanitha Vijayakumar; Preetha Vijayakumar; Sridevi Vijayakumar; Arun Vijay (step-son); Kavitha Vijayakumar (step-daughter); Dr Anitha Vijayakumar (step-daughter)
- Parent(s): Father : Pani Rao; Mother : Kowsalya
- Relatives: Jovika Vijayakumar (granddaughter)

Manjula Vijayakumar (4 July 1954 – 23 July 2013) was an Indian actress. She acted in more than 100 films in South Indian languages like Tamil, Telugu, Kannada and Malayalam.

== Personal life ==
She and actor Vijayakumar got married in 1976. The couple have three daughters, Vanitha, Preetha and Sridevi. Arun Vijay, Anitha, and Kavitha are her husband's children from his first marriage. Sanjeev and Sindhu are her nephew and niece respectively (elder sister's son and daughter respectively).

== Acting career ==
She first appeared in the film Shanthi Nilayam (1969) in a supporting role (as the teenaged niece of Gemini Ganesan's character). Her first lead role was in Rickshawkaran (1971). She acted in lead roles in many films till the late seventies. Since the late 80's, she has appeared in supporting roles. Manjula has performed alongside R. Muthuraman, Sivaji Ganesan, Gemini Ganesan, M. G. Ramachandran, Nandamuri Taraka Rama Rao, Akkineni Nageswara Rao, Krishna, Shobhan Babu, Kamal Haasan, Vishnuvardhan and Rajinikanth.

== Death ==
Manjula died on 23 July 2013 in SRMC at Chennai after falling down from bed and being admitted to hospital. Her death was caused by kidney failure and a blood clot in the stomach.

== Partial filmography ==
Year	Movie	Role	Language	Notes
1969	Shanti Nilayam	Bhaskar's niece	Tamil	
1970	Jai Jawan		Telugu	
1971	Rickshawkaran	Kumari Uma	Tamil	
1972	Shakthi Leelai	Poonguzhali	Tamil	
1972	Marapurani Manishi	Lakshmi	Telugu	
1972	Neethi Nijayathi		Telugu	
1972	Idhaya Veenai	Vimala	Tamil	
1973	Amman Arul		Tamil	
1973	Maru Piravi	Saradha	Tamil	
1973	Pookkari	Valli	Tamil	
1973	Engal Thanga Raja	Vasanthi	Tamil	
1973	Pasa Deepam		Tamil	
1973	Mayadari Malligadu	Chandri	Telugu	
1973	Vade Veedu		Telugu	
1973	Devudu Chesina Manushulu		Telugu	
1973	Ulagam Sutrum Valiban	Vimala	Tamil	
1974	Raja Nagam		Tamil	
1974	Palletoori Chinnodu		Telugu	
1974	Doctoramma		Tamil	
1974	Alluri Seetarama Raju	Ratti	Telugu	
1974	En Magan	Radha	Tamil	
1974	Manchi Manushulu	Radha	Telugu	
1974	Dorababu		Telugu	
1974	Netru Indru Naalai	Annam	Tamil	
1975	Ellorum Nallavare		Tamil	
1975	Ek Gaon Ki Kahani	Bela	Hindi	
1975	Andaroo Manchivare		Telugu	
1975	Anbe Aaruyire	Sridevi	Tamil	
1975	Ninaithadhai Mudippavan	Leela	Tamil	
1975	Dr. Siva	Geetha	Tamil	
1975	Gunavanthudu		Telugu	
1975	Devudulanti Manishi	Lakshmi	Telugu	
1975	Jebu Donga	Madhavi	Telugu	
1975	Avandhan Manidhan	Manju	Tamil	
1975	Mannavan Vanthaanadi	Prema	Tamil	
1976	Mahakavi Kshetrayya	Devadasi/ Bhama	Telugu	
1976	Pichi Maraju	Dr. Radha	Telugu	
1976	Iddaru Iddare		Telugu	
1976	Mahakavi Kshetrayya		Telugu	
1976	Uthaman	Radha	Tamil	
1976	Magaadu	Anita	Telugu	
1976	Manushulanta Okkate	Santhi	Telugu	
1976	Neram Nadi Kadu Akalidi	Gowri	Telugu	
1976	Naa Pere Bhagavan		Telugu	
1976	Bhale Dongalu		Telugu	
1976	Monagadu	Latha	Telugu	
1976	Bhale Dongalu	Rekha	Telugu	
1976	Sathyam	Gowri	Tamil	
1977	Chiranjeevi Rambabu	Sarada	Telugu	
1977	Bangaru Bommalu		Telugu	
1977	Avan Oru Sarithiram	Gomathi	Tamil	
1977	Maa Iddari Katha		Telugu	
1977	Gadusu Pillodu	Latha	Telugu	
1977	Manushulu Chesina Dongalu		Telugu	
1977	Chanakya Chandragupta	Chhaya	Telugu	
1978	Siritanakke Savaal		Kannada	
1978	Sabhash Gopi		Telugu	
1978	Toofan Mail		Telugu	
1978	Allidharbar		Tamil	
1978	Shankar Salim Simon	Alamelu	Tamil	
1978	Adhirstakaran		Tamil	
1978	Paavaadakkaari		Malayalam	
1978	Tiger Salim		Malayalam	
1979	Pancharatnam		Malayalam	
1979	Neeya?	Usha	Tamil	
1979	Velli Ratham		Tamil	
1979	Kuppathu Raja	Mynaa	Tamil	
1980	Natchathiram		Tamil	
1982	Nenjangal		Tamil	
1982	Kayyala Ammayi Kalavari Abbayi	Subhadra	Telugu	
1982	Prema Nakshatram		Telugu	
1983	Himam	Ammu	Malayalam	
1983	Tarzan Sundari	Janaki	Telugu	
1986	Papikondalu		Telugu	
1988	Jeevana Ganga	Raja's mother	Telugu	
1988	Chikkadu Dorakadu		Telugu	
1989	Kaaval Poonaigal		Tamil	
1989	Prema	Stella	Telugu	
1989	Two Town Rowdy	Padmini's Mother	Telugu	
1990	Padmavathi Kalyanam		Telugu	
1990	Pudhu Vasantham	Guest Appearance	Tamil	
1990	Raktha Jwala		Telugu	
1990	Pudhu Varisu	Meenakshi	Tamil	
1991	Abhimanyu	Brothel Madam	Malayalam	
1991	Inspector Balram	Indira Shankar / Dularibai	Malayalam	
1991	Chavettupada		Malayalam	
1991	Cheran Pandiyan	Paarvathi	Tamil	
1991	Vetri Karangal	Lakshmi	Tamil	
1991	Adhikari	Doctor Manjula	Tamil	Guest appearance
1992	Amaran	Amaran's foster mother	Tamil	
1992	Chanti	Nandhini's elder sister in law	Telugu	
1992	Kaviya Thalaivan	Subha	Tamil	
1992	Senthamizh Paattu	Meenakshi	Tamil	
1992	Mudhal Kural	Mohanamba	Tamil	
1993	Jackpot	Rakhee Varma	Malayalam	
1993	Padhavi		Malayalam	
1993	Thalattu	Revathi's mother	Tamil	
1994	Sukham Sukhakaram	Jaya's mother	Malayalam	
1994	Sakthivel	Lakshmi	Tamil	
1994	Purushanai Kaikkulla Pottukkanum	Janaki	Tamil	
1994	Priyanka	Susila	Tamil	
1994	Nila	Lakshmi	Tamil	
1994	Siragadikka Aasai	Padma	Tamil	
1994	Pudhupatti Ponnuthaayi	Valliamma	Tamil	
1994	Thaatboot Thanjavoor	Sundaram's sister	Tamil	
1995	Lucky Man	Karthik's mother	Tamil	
1995	Ilaya Ragam	Vanitha's mother	Tamil	
1995	Padikkara Vayasula	Anasooya	Tamil	
1995	Indian Military Intelligence	Gressy	Malayalam	
1996	Saradha Bullodu	Rajeswari Devi	Telugu	
1996	Amma Ammani Choodalanivundi	Annapoornamma	Telugu	
1997	Thambi Durai	Shenbagam's stepmother	Tamil	
1998	Naam Iruvar Namakku Iruvar	Manju	Tamil	
1999	Suriya Paarvai	Lakshmi	Tamil	Partially reshot in Telugu as "Hello Friend"
1999	Suyamvaram	Suseela	Tamil	
1999	Red Indians	Matha Mayadevi	Malayalam	
2001	Samudhiram	Parvathi	Tamil	
2002	Vasu	Vasu's Mother	Telugu	
2011	En Ullam Unnai Theduthey	Janaki Ammal	Tamil	

== Television ==
- Nandini (Deceased character in photograph)
- Unnai Paarkum Neram as Uma's aunty.
- Sundarakanda as Mahalakshmi
- Wow - Game Show
