= Thangavelu Asokan =

Indian engineer

Thangavelu Asokan from the GE India Technology Centre, Bangalore, Karnataka, India was named Fellow of Indian Academy of Sciences in 2012 for contributions to the development technologies for electrical safety.
