= Bhamidipati Kameswara Rao =

Indian writer in Telugu (1897–1958)

Bhamidipati Kameswara Rao (1897–1958) was an Indian writer in the Telugu language, known for his humorous plays. He was inspired by French writer Moliere, whose plays he adapted into Telugu. Bhamidipati became a trendsetter in the field of comedic playwriting. Bhamidipati some English farces into Telugu and wrote original prahasanas (farces) in Telugu. His prahasanas are considered to be the best among Indian playwrights.

== Early life ==
Bhamidipati's father Narsavadhanulu was a Vedic scholar. Bhamidipati developed a love for literature as a younth. In that era, many theatre organizations competed for awards in Parishat competitions in verse drama. Bhamidipati, belonging to a poor family was a beneficiary. That helped him to finish school. "Drama stood by me and hence I shall do something for drama" was his motto and he began writing plays, especially for students.

== Career ==
He joined the government service, but economic and family conditions forced him to work as a teacher at Rajahmundry. Bhamidipati earned an M.A in Mathematics and retired as headmaster of Veeresalingam High School, Rajahmundry.

He was in the company of legendary literary figures like Madhunapantula Satyanarayana, Chilakamarthi Lakshmi Narasimham, Sripada Krishnamurthy Sastry and Kasi Krishnamacharyulu. His primary influence was from Raghupathi Venkataratnam Naidu. Bhamidipati was a fan of English plays and literature. He began researching various works that resulted in his writing of Andhra Padyanataka Pathanam.

== Works ==
- Rachanalu-Vol.1 - Humour, satire:(2008)
- Rachanalu-2 Essay Anthology (2010)
- Rachanalu-4 Play Anthology (2011)
- Prahasanaalu( Subject: PLAYS, Year of Publication: 2012)
- Thyagaraja Atmavicaram (1949)
- Bataa khani

== Book on Bhamidipati ==
Sahitya Akedemi commissioned biography from Tallavajhula Patanjali Sastry. Apparently, Bhamidipati told his son Radhakrishna, who later became a scriptwriter; that he committed a mistake in adapting Moliere in his works and asked his son never to follow other's works.
"Though he wrote comedies, he remained an introvert and never smiled even when someone cracked a joke," informs Patanjali Sastry.
Bhamidipati was greatly influenced by Gurajada Appa Rao's works, especially for its modernity and use of spoken regional dialect.
Viswanatha Satyanarayana declared that Bhamidipati was the greatest comedic playwright ever. Jayapur Maharaja accorded him the title of 'Hasya Brahma'.
