= 1971 in film =

The year 1971 in film involved some significant events.

== Highest-grossing films (U.S.) ==
The top ten 1971 released films by box office gross in North America are as follows:

Highest-grossing films of 1971
Rank	Title	Distributor	Domestic rentals
1	Fiddler on the Roof	United Artists	$40,500,000
2	Billy Jack	Warner Bros.	$32,500,000
3	The French Connection	20th Century Fox	$26,300,000
4	Summer of '42	Warner Bros.	$20,500,000
5	Diamonds Are Forever	United Artists	$19,727,000
6	Dirty Harry	Warner Bros.	$18,000,000
7	A Clockwork Orange	Warner Bros.	$17,000,000
8	Carnal Knowledge	Embassy	$14,075,000
9	The Last Picture Show	Columbia	$13,110,000
10	Bedknobs and Broomsticks	Disney	$11,426,000

== Events ==
- February 8 - Bob Dylan's hour-long documentary film, Eat the Document, premieres at New York's Academy of Music. The film includes footage from Dylan's 1966 UK tour.
- April 23 - Melvin Van Peebles film Sweet Sweetback's Baadasssss Song becomes the highest-grossing independent film of 1971.
- May - The first permanent IMAX projection system begins showing at Ontario Place's "Cinesphere" in Toronto.
- May 10 - Frank Yablans becomes President of Paramount Pictures.
- Britain's National Film School begins operation at Beaconsfield Film Studios.

== Awards ==
Category/Organization	29th Golden Globe Awards February 6, 1972		25th BAFTA Awards February 26, 1972	44th Academy Awards April 10, 1972
Category/Organization	Drama	Comedy or Musical	25th BAFTA Awards February 26, 1972	44th Academy Awards April 10, 1972
Best Film	The French Connection	Fiddler on the Roof	Sunday Bloody Sunday	The French Connection
Best Director	William Friedkin; The French Connection		John Schlesinger; Sunday Bloody Sunday	William Friedkin; The French Connection
Best Actor	Gene Hackman; The French Connection	Chaim Topol; Fiddler on the Roof	Peter Finch; Sunday Bloody Sunday	Gene Hackman; The French Connection
Best Actress	Jane Fonda; Klute	Twiggy; The Boy Friend	Glenda Jackson; Sunday Bloody Sunday	Jane Fonda; Klute
Best Supporting Actor	Ben Johnson; The Last Picture Show		Edward Fox; The Go-Between	Ben Johnson; The Last Picture Show
Best Supporting Actress	Ann-Margret; Carnal Knowledge		Margaret Leighton; The Go-Between	Cloris Leachman; The Last Picture Show
Best Screenplay, Original	The Hospital; Paddy Chayefsky		The Go-Between; Harold Pinter	The Hospital; Paddy Chayefsky
Best Screenplay, Adapted	The Hospital; Paddy Chayefsky		The Go-Between; Harold Pinter	The French Connection; Ernest Tidyman
Best Original Score	Isaac Hayes; Shaft		Michel Legrand; Summer of '42	Michel Legrand; Summer of '42; John Williams; Fiddler on the Roof
Best Original Song	"Life Is What You Make It"; Kotch		N/A	"Theme from Shaft"; Shaft
Best Foreign Language Film	The Policeman		N/A	The Garden of the Finzi-Continis

Palme d'Or (Cannes Film Festival):

The Go-Between, directed by Joseph Losey, United Kingdom

Golden Bear (Berlin Film Festival):

The Garden of the Finzi-Continis (Il Giardino dei Finzi-Contini), directed by Vittorio De Sica, Italy / W. Germany

== 1971 films ==
=== By country/region ===
- List of American films of 1971
- List of Argentine films of 1971
- List of Australian films of 1971
- List of Bangladeshi films of 1971
- List of British films of 1971
- List of Canadian films of 1971
- List of French films of 1971
- List of Hong Kong films of 1971
- List of Indian films of 1971
  - List of Hindi films of 1971
  - List of Kannada films of 1971
  - List of Malayalam films of 1971
  - List of Marathi films of 1971
  - List of Tamil films of 1971
  - List of Telugu films of 1971
- List of Japanese films of 1971
- List of Mexican films of 1971
- List of Pakistani films of 1971
- List of South Korean films of 1971
- List of Soviet films of 1971
- List of Spanish films of 1971

=== By genre/medium ===
- List of action films of 1971
- List of animated feature films of 1971
- List of avant-garde films of 1971
- List of comedy films of 1971
- List of drama films of 1971
- List of horror films of 1971
- List of science fiction films of 1971
- List of thriller films of 1971
- List of western films of 1971

== Births ==
- January 2
  - Taye Diggs, American actor
  - Renée Elise Goldsberry, American actress and singer
- January 3 - Sarah Alexander, English actress
- January 7
  - Kevin Rahm, American actor
  - Jeremy Renner, American actor
- January 11 - Mary J. Blige, American singer-songwriter and actress
- January 13 - Caspar Phillipson, Danish actor and singer
- January 14 - Jennifer Dundas, American actress
- January 15 - Regina King, American actress
- January 16
  - Josh Evans, American filmmaker, screenwriter and actor
  - Jonathan Mangum, American actor and comedian
- January 17 - Youki Kudoh, Japanese actress and singer
- January 19 - Shawn Wayans, American actor, comedian, writer and producer
- January 20 - Questlove, American musician, filmmaker and actor
- January 21 - Dylan Kussman, American writer and actor
- January 22 - Katie Finneran, American actress
- January 23 - Diana Barrows, American actress, singer and dancer
- January 24
  - Jonathan Aris, English actor
  - Stanislas Merhar, French actor
- January 27
  - Karin Tammaru, Estonian actress
  - Fann Wong, Singaporean actress, singer and model
- January 31
  - Darren Boyd, British actor
  - Patricia Velásquez, Venezuelan actress
- February 1
  - Michael C. Hall, American actor
  - Jill Kelly, American pornographic actress
  - Liisa Repo-Martell, Canadian actress
  - Hynden Walch, American actress, voice actress, writer and singer
- February 2 - Arly Jover, Spanish actress
- February 3 - Elisa Donovan, American actress
- February 4 - Rob Corddry, American actor and comedian
- February 5 - Myndy Crist, American actress
- February 6 - Brian Stepanek, American actor
- February 11 - Damian Lewis, English actor
- February 12 - Scott Menville, American actor
- February 14
  - Kris Aquino, Filipino actress, television presenter and producer
  - Noriko Sakai, Japanese actress and singer
- February 15
  - Alex Borstein, American actress
  - Renee O'Connor, American actress
- February 17 - Denise Richards, American actress
- February 18
  - E. Roger Mitchell, American actor
  - Hiep Thi Le, Vietnamese-American actress (d. 2017)
- February 21 - Andréa Burns, American actress and singer
- February 22 - Lea Salonga, Filipina actress, singer, and columnist
- February 25 - Sean Astin, American actor
- February 28 - Tasha Smith, American actor, director and producer
- March 1
  - Ma Dong-seok, South Korean-born American actor
  - Teresa Gallagher, American-born British actress, voice actress and singer
- March 2
  - Stefano Accorsi, Italian actor
  - Method Man, American actor and musician
  - Amber Smith, American actress
- March 4 - Shavar Ross, American actor, director, screenwriter, producer and editor
- March 5
  - Yuri Lowenthal, American voice actor
  - Scott Mosier, American producer, director and editor
- March 7
  - Peter Sarsgaard, American actor
  - Matthew Vaughn, English filmmaker
- March 8 - Rose Keegan, British actress
- March 9 - Kyle Balda, American animator and director
- March 10 - Jon Hamm, American actor
- March 11 - Johnny Knoxville, American actor, comedian, producer, and screenwriter
- March 13 - Annabeth Gish, American actress
- March 15 - Chris Patton, American voice actor
- March 16 - Alan Tudyk, American actor and voice actor
- March 22
  - Iben Hjejle, Danish actress
  - Keegan-Michael Key, American actor, comedian, writer and producer
  - Will Yun Lee, American actor and martial artist
- March 24 - Megyn Price, American actress
- March 25 - Peter Shinkoda, Canadian actor
- March 26 - Francis Lawrence, Austrian-born American filmmaker and producer
- March 27 - Nathan Fillion, Canadian actor
- March 29
  - Michael-Leon Wooley, American theatre, film, television and voice actor
  - Hidetoshi Nishijima, Japanese actor
- March 31
  - Craig McCracken, American cartoonist, animator, director, writer and producer
  - Ewan McGregor, Scottish actor
- April 1 - Lachy Hulme, Australian actor and screenwriter
- April 5
  - Krista Allen, American actress, model and stand-up comedian
  - Victoria Hamilton, English actress
- April 7 - Jennifer Schwalbach Smith, American actress
- April 12
  - Nicholas Brendon, American actor and writer (d. 2026)
  - Shannen Doherty, American actress (d. 2024)
- April 15
  - Andy Daly, American actor, comedian and writer
  - Kate Harbour, English voice actress
- April 16
  - Max Beesley, English actor and musician
  - Peter Billingsley, American actor, director and producer
- April 18 - David Tennant, Scottish actor
- April 19
  - Gad Elmaleh, Moroccan-Canadian stand-up comedian and actor
  - Desreta Jackson, Virgin Islander actress
  - Wendy Powell, American voice actress
- April 22 - Eric Mabius, American actor
- April 24
  - Anastasia Barzee, American actress
  - Kate Dickie, Scottish actress
  - Stefania Rocca, Italian actress
- April 26 - Shondrella Avery, American actress and comedian
- April 28 - Bridget Moynahan, American actress
- April 30 - Stephen Kunken, American actor
- May 10
  - Adriano Giannini, Italian actor and voice actor
  - Leslie Stefanson, American actress
- May 12 - Steven Mond, Canadian former child actor
- May 14 - Sofia Coppola, American actress, writer, and director
- May 17 - Randy Davison, American actor
- May 21 - Amy Spanger, American actress and singer
- May 22 - MC Eiht, American rapper and actor
- May 23 - Laurel Holloman, American actress
- May 25 - Justin Henry, American actor
- May 26 - Matt Stone, American actor, creator of South Park
- May 27
  - Paul Bettany, English actor
  - Lisa Lopes, American singer and actress (d. 2002)
- May 30
  - Duncan Jones, British director, producer and screenwriter
  - Idina Menzel, American actress, singer and songwriter
  - John Ross Bowie, American actor and comedian
- 31 May - Jon Øigarden, Norwegian actor
- June 2
  - Anthony Montgomery, American actor
  - Espen Sandberg, Norwegian director
- June 4
  - James Callis, British actor
  - Noah Wyle, American actor
- June 5
  - Susan Lynch, Northern Irish actress
  - Mark Wahlberg, American actor and musician
- June 8
  - Kent Faulcon, American actor, director and writer
  - Mark Feuerstein, American actor
- June 11 - Kenjiro Tsuda, Japanese actor
- June 13 - Bryan Massey, American actor
- June 14 - Sophiya Haque, English actress and singer (d. 2013)
- June 15
  - Jake Busey, American actor
  - Taavi Eelmaa, Estonian actor
  - Daniel Lapaine, Australian actor
- June 16
  - Eva Püssa, Estonian actress
  - Tupac Shakur, American actor and rapper (d. 1996)
- June 18
  - Lisa Barbuscia, American model, singer and actress
  - Mara Hobel, American actress
- June 20 - Josh Lucas, American actor
- June 22 - Mary Lynn Rajskub, American actress and comedian
- June 28
  - Benito Martinez, American actor
  - Aileen Quinn, American actress and singer
- June 30
  - Tom Green, Canadian-American comedian, show host, actor and filmmaker
  - Monica Potter, American actress
- July 1
  - Missy Elliott, American musician and actress
  - Julianne Nicholson, American actress
  - Melissa Peterman, American actress, television host and comedian
- July 3 - Benedict Wong, English actor
- July 4
  - Kate Dickie, Scottish actress
  - Al Madrigal, American comedian, writer, actor and producer
- July 7 - Christian Camargo, American actor, producer, writer and director
- July 8 - Amanda Peterson, American actress (d. 2015)
- July 9 - Scott Grimes, American actor and singer
- July 15 - Jim Rash, American actor, comedian and filmmaker
- July 16 - Corey Feldman, American actor
- July 18 - Sarah McLeod, New Zealand actress
- July 19
  - Kate Henshaw, Nigerian actress
  - Andres Puustusmaa, Estonian actor and director
- July 20 - Sandra Oh, Canadian-American actress
- July 21 - Charlotte Gainsbourg, French-British actress
- July 24 - Patty Jenkins, American director, screenwriter and producer
- July 25 - Miriam Shor, American actress
- July 29 - Selena Tan, Singaporean actress, producer, director and writer
- July 30 - Christine Taylor, American actress
- July 31 - Eve Best, British actress
- August 4
  - Stuart Beattie, Australian filmmaker
  - Yo-Yo, American rapper and actress
- August 6 - Merrin Dungey, American actress
- August 9
  - Mark Povinelli, American actor
  - Nikki Ziering, American model and actress
- August 10
  - Luca Guadagnino, Italian director and producer
  - Justin Theroux, American actor
- August 12
  - Rebecca Gayheart, American actress
  - Yvette Nicole Brown, American actress, comedian, writer and host
- August 13
  - Moritz Bleibtreu, German actor and director
  - Heike Makatsch, German actress, voice actress and singer
  - Rolando Molina, Salvadoran actor
- August 14
  - Raoul Bova, Italian actor
  - Scott Michael Campbell, American actor, writer, producer and director
- August 17 - Oliver Robins, American actor, writer and director
- August 18 - Jacob Vargas, Mexican-American actor
- August 20
  - David Walliams, English comedian, actor, writer and television personality
  - Ke Huy Quan, American actor and stunt choreographer
- August 21 - Kristi Angus, Canadian actress
- August 22 - Richard Armitage, English actor and author
- August 25 - Claire Rushbrook, English actress
- August 29 - Carla Gugino, American actress
- August 31 - Chris Tucker, American actor
- September 1 - Maury Sterling, American actor
- September 2 - Katt Williams, American actor and comedian
- September 3 - Drena De Niro, American actress and filmmaker
- September 8
  - David Arquette, American actor, film director, producer and screenwriter
  - Martin Freeman, English actor
- September 9
  - Eric Stonestreet, American actor and comedian
  - Henry Thomas, American actor
- September 14
  - Pat Healy, American actor
  - Kimberly Williams-Paisley, American actress
- September 15
  - Josh Charles, American actor
  - Colleen O'Shaughnessey, American voice actress
- September 16 - Amy Poehler, American actress
- September 17
  - Bobby Lee, American stand-up comedian and actor
  - Felix Solis, American actor, director and producer
  - Ian Whyte, Welsh actor and stuntman
- September 18 - Jada Pinkett Smith, American actress
- September 19
  - Sanaa Lathan, American actress
  - Selene Luna, Mexican-American actress and comedian
- September 21 - Luke Wilson, American actor
- September 22 - Lawrence Gilliard Jr., American actor
- September 27 - Amanda Detmer, American actress
- September 28 - Matt Day, Australian actor and filmmaker
- September 29 - Mackenzie Crook, English actor, comedian, director and writer
- September 30 - Jenna Elfman, American actress
- October 5
  - Matthew Maher, American actor
  - Samuel Vincent, Canadian voice actor and singer
- October 6 - Emily Mortimer, English actress
- October 10 - Amanda Ryan, English actress
- October 11
  - Justin Lin, Taiwanese-American director
  - Trish Sie, American director
- October 13
  - Sacha Baron Cohen, English actor, comedian, screenwriter and producer
  - Luis Tosar, Spanish actor and musician
- October 16 - Paul Sparks, American actor
- October 17 - Andy Whitfield, Welsh actor (d. 2011)
- October 20
  - Snoop Dogg, American rapper, songwriter, media personality and actor
  - Kenneth Choi, American actor
  - Rachel House, New Zealand actress and director
- October 21 - Jennifer Lee, American screenwriter, film director and chief creative officer of Walt Disney Animation Studios
- October 25 - Craig Robinson, American actor, comedian, musician and singer
- October 26
  - Rosemarie DeWitt, American actress
  - Anthony Rapp, American actor and singer
  - Phil Johnston, American screenwriter, director, producer and voice actor
- October 29 - Winona Ryder, American actress
- November 2 - Meta Golding, Haitian-American actress
- November 3
  - Piret Laurimaa, Estonian actress
  - Dylan Moran, Irish comedian, writer and actor
- November 4 - Tabu, Indian actress
- November 5 - Chris Addison, British comedian, writer, actor and director
- November 9 - Jason Antoon, American actor
- November 10 - Walton Goggins, American actor
- November 11 - David DeLuise, American actor
- November 13 - Noah Hathaway, American actor
- November 14
  - Giovanni Cirfiera, Italian actor
  - Marco Leonardi, Italian actor
- November 16 - Justine Clarke, Australian actress, singer, musician and television host
- November 17 - David Ramsey, American actor, director and martial artist
- November 18 - Goran Kostić, Serbian actor
- November 20
  - Enrico Casarosa, Italian-American storyboard artist, director and writer
  - Joel McHale, American actor, comedian, writer, producer and television host
- November 23
  - Lisa Arch, American actress and comedian
  - Chris Hardwick, American comedian, actor, television and podcast host, writer and producer
- November 24 - Lior Raz, Israeli actor and screenwriter
- November 25 - Christina Applegate, American actress
- November 29 - Naoko Mori, Japanese actress
- December 3
  - Joseph Gatt, English actor
  - Ola Rapace, Swedish actor
- December 5
  - Mitch Silpa, American writer, actor and director
  - Kali Rocha, American actress
  - Dolly Wells, English actress and writer
- December 6 - Katariina Unt, Estonian actress
- December 7 - DeObia Oparei, English actor
- December 9 - Emma Thomas, English producer
- December 14 - Natascha McElhone, British actress
- December 17
  - Sinan Akkuş, Turkish-German actor
  - Claire Forlani, English actress
- December 18 - Claudia Gerini, Italian actress
- December 21 - Glenn Fitzgerald, American actor
- December 23 - Corey Haim, Canadian actor (d. 2010)
- December 25
  - Patrick Baladi, English actor and musician
  - Ain Mäeots, Estonian actor, director and producer
- December 26 - Jared Leto, American actor and musician
- December 30 - Daniel Sunjata, American actor

== Deaths ==
Month
Date
Name
Age
Country
Profession
Notable films
January
5
Douglas Shearer
71
Canada
Sound Engineer
- The Wizard of Oz
- Singin' in the Rain
5
Fanfulla
57
Italy
Actor
- Fellini Satyricon
- The Clowns
15
John Dall
52
US
Actor
- Rope
- Spartacus
20
Broncho Billy Anderson
90
US
Actor, Director, Writer
- The Great Train Robbery
- The Weak-End Party
25
Isobel Lennart
55
US
Screenwriter
- Two for the Seesaw
- Funny Girl
February
3
Jay C. Flippen
71
US
Actor
- Oklahoma!
- Winchester '73
22
Frédéric Mariotti
87
France
Actor
- Barrabas
- Mare Nostrum
22
Matt McHugh
77
US
Actor
- Street Scene
- The Last Trail
26
Fernandel
67
France
Actor
- Around the World in 80 Days
- The Little World of Don Camillo
March
5
Winnie Lightner
71
US
Actress
- Gold Diggers of Broadway
- She Had to Say Yes
8
Harold Lloyd
77
US
Actor, Director, Writer
- Safety Last!
- The Freshman
8
Borden Chase
71
US
Screenwriter
- Red River
- Winchester '73
12
Roy Glenn
56
US
Actor
- Guess Who's Coming to Dinner
- A Raisin in the Sun
12
Tor Johnson
67
Sweden
Actor
- Plan 9 from Outer Space
- Bride of the Monster
15
Bebe Daniels
70
US
Actress
- 42nd Street
- The Maltese Falcon
21
Nan Wynn
55
US
Singer, Actress
- A Shot in the Dark
- Pardon My Sarong
22
Nella Walker
85
US
Actress
- Elmer and Elsie
- Fugitive Lady
23
Basil Dearden
60
UK
Director
- Dead of Night
- Khartoum
30
Selmer Jackson
82
US
Actor
- Hey, Rookie
- The Glass Alibi
30
Werner Peters
52
Germany
Actor
- Dog Eat Dog
- Death Knocks Twice
April
9
Paulette Noizeux
83
France
Actress
- Lady Killer
- La Digue
20
Cecil Parker
73
UK
Actor
- Oh! What a Lovely War
- The Citadel
21
Edmund Lowe
81
US
Actor
- Dinner at Eight
- Dillinger
28
John Tansey
69
US
Actor, Director
- The Sky Rider
- Trouping with Ellen
May
1
Glenda Farrell
66
US
Actress
- Little Caesar
- I Am a Fugitive from a Chain Gang
26
John Longden
71
UK
Actor
- Blackmail
- Dial 999
27
Chips Rafferty
62
Australia
Actor
- The Sundowners
- Mutiny on the Bounty
28
Audie Murphy
45
US
Actor
- The Red Badge of Courage
- To Hell and Back
June
8
Piero Gherardi
61
Italy
Production, Costume Designer
- La Dolce Vita
- 8½
9
Harold Lloyd Jr.
40
US
Actor
- The Flaming Urge
- Mutiny in Outer Space
10
Michael Rennie
61
UK
Actor
- The Robe
- The Day the Earth Stood Still
14
Kenneth Macpherson
69
Scotland-Italy
Film-maker
- Borderline
18
Thomas Gomez
65
US
Actor
- Key Largo
- Pittsburgh
July
6
Louis Armstrong
69
US
Actor, Musician
- Hello, Dolly!
- High Society
11
Carleton G. Young
64
US
Actor
- Hard, Fast and Beautiful
- Queen of Burlesque
17
Cliff Edwards
76
US
Actor, Singer
- Pinocchio
- Dumbo
19
Norman Reilly Raine
77
US
Screenwriter
- The Adventures of Robin Hood
- The Life of Emile Zola
23
Van Heflin
62
US
Actor
- Shane
- 3:10 to Yuma
24
Christl Mardayn
74
Austria
Actress, Singer
- The Shanghai Drama
- Victoria in Dover
August
3
Ernst Eklund
81
Sweden
Actor
- Crisis
- Banketten
15
Paul Lukas
80
Hungary
Actor
- The Lady Vanishes
- 20,000 Leagues Under the Sea
16
Spyros Skouras
78
Greece
Producer, Studio Executive
- Cleopatra
- The Hustler
17
Horace McMahon
65
US
Actor
- Detective Story
- Susan Slept Here
September
7
Spring Byington
84
US
Actress
- Meet John Doe
- You Can't Take It with You
10
Pier Angeli
39
Italy
Actress
- Somebody Up There Likes Me
- Battle of the Bulge
11
Bella Darvi
42
Poland
Actress
- The Egyptian
- Hell and High Water
October
11
Chester Conklin
85
US
Actor
- Modern Times
- The Great Dictator
12
Fritz Achterberg
90
Germany
Actor
- Hamlet
- The False Dimitri
13
Phoebe Ephron
57
US
Screenwriter
- Desk Set
- Captain Newman, M.D.
19
Betty Bronson
64
US
Actress
- Ben-Hur: A Tale of the Christ
- Yodelin' Kid from Pine Ridge
24
Cheryl Walker
53
US
Actress
- Shadows on the Sage
- Stage Door Canteen
26
Vincent Coleman
71
US
Actor
- Has the World Gone Mad?
- The Magic Cup
November
2
Martha Vickers
46
US
Actress
- The Big Sleep
- Alimony
4
Ann Pennington
77
US
Actress
- The Rainbow Princess
- Tanned Legs
17
Gladys Cooper
82
UK
Actress
- My Fair Lady
- Rebecca
17
Fania Marinoff
81
US
Actress
- One of Our Girls
19
Stuart Gilmore
70
US
Editor, Director
- Sullivan's Travels
- The Virginian
26
Bengt Ekerot
51
Sweden
Actor
- The Seventh Seal
- The Magician
December
12
Frank Wolff
43
US
Actor
- Salvatore Giuliano
- Once Upon a Time in the West
13
Dita Parlo
63
Poland
Actress
- La Grande Illusion
- L'Atalante
18
Diana Lynn
45
US
Actress
- The Miracle of Morgan's Creek
- The Kentuckian
26
Robert Lowery
58
US
Actor
- The Mark of Zorro
- Batman and Robin
28
Max Steiner
83
Austria
Composer
- Casablanca
- Gone with the Wind
28
Burt Gillett
80
US
Director
- Flowers and Trees
- Three Little Pigs
29
Stuart Holmes
87
US
Actor
- The Four Horsemen of the Apocalypse
- The Prisoner of Zenda
30
Dorothy Comingore
58
US
Actress
- Citizen Kane
- The Hairy Ape
31
Marin Sais
81
US
Actress
- Oath of Vengeance
- Reefer Madness
31
Lucien Hubbard
83
US
Producer, screenwriter
- Wings
- The Maltese Falcon

== Film debuts ==
- F. Murray Abraham – They Might Be Giants
- Brooke Adams – Murders in the Rue Morgue
- Frank Adonis – The French Connection
- John Amos – Vanishing Point
- Alun Armstrong – Get Carter
- Kathy Bates – Taking Off
- Barry Bostwick – Jennifer on My Mind
- Sam Bottoms – The Last Picture Show
- Timothy Bottoms – Johnny Got His Gun
- Jim Broadbent – The Go-Between
- Niall Buggy – Here Are Ladies
- Keith Carradine – McCabe & Mrs. Miller
- Stockard Channing – The Hospital
- Jeff Conaway – Jennifer on My Mind
- Kevin Conway – Believe in Me
- Brian Cox – Nicholas and Alexandra
- Wes Craven – You've Got to Walk It Like You Talk It or You'll Lose That Beat (editor)
- Daniel Day-Lewis – Sunday Bloody Sunday
- Jan Decleir – Mira
- Gérard Depardieu – Cry of the Cormoran
- Larry Drake – This Stuff'll Kill Ya!
- Max Gail – The Organization
- Christopher Guest – The Hospital
- Kay Hawtrey – Face-Off
- Isaac Hayes – Shaft
- Edward Herrmann – Lady Liberty
- Art Hindle – The Proud Rider
- Judd Hirsch – Jump
- Eric Idle – And Now for Something Completely Different
- Gemma Jones – The Devils
- Carol Kane – Carnal Knowledge
- William Katt – The Late Liz
- Jack Kehoe – The Gang That Couldn't Shoot Straight
- Bruno Kirby – The Young Graduates
- Kris Kristofferson – The Last Movie
- Marcia Jean Kurtz – The Panic in Needle Park
- Eugene Levy – Foxy Lady
- Andrea Martin – Foxy Lady
- Michael Moriarty – My Old Man's Place
- Josh Mostel – Going Home
- Craig T. Nelson – The Return of Count Yorga
- Cassandra Peterson – Diamonds Are Forever
- Randy Quaid – The Last Picture Show
- Anne Ramsey – The Sporting Club
- John Ritter – The Barefoot Executive
- Wayne Robson – McCabe & Mrs. Miller
- Richard Roundtree – Shaft
- Vincent Schiavelli – Taking Off
- David Selby – Night of Dark Shadows
- Cybill Shepherd – The Last Picture Show
- Rainbeaux Smith – Evel Knievel
- Josef Sommer – Dirty Harry
- Bruce Spence – Stork
- David Ogden Stiers – THX 1138
- Jack Thompson – Wake in Fright
- Glynn Turman – Honky
- Susan Tyrrell – Shoot Out
- Willeke van Ammelrooy – Mira
- Mario Van Peebles – Sweet Sweetback's Baadasssss Song
- Tracey Walter – Ginger
- Sandy Ward – The Velvet Vampire
- Jacki Weaver – Stork
- Noble Willingham – The Last Picture Show
