= Courtleigh =

Courtleigh is a surname. Notable people with the surname include:

- Robert Courtleigh (1916–2004), American actor
- William Courtleigh (1869–1930), American actor
- William Courtleigh Jr. (1892–1918), American actor
