= List of Tamil films of 1971 =

Post-amendment to the Tamil Nadu Entertainments Tax Act 1939 on 1 April 1958, Gross jumped to 140 per cent of Nett Commercial Taxes Department disclosed ₹9.82 crore in entertainment tax revenue for the year.

The following is a list of films produced in the Tamil film industry in India in 1971, in alphabetical order.

== 1971 ==
Title	Director	Production	Music	Cast
Aathi Parasakthi	K. S. Gopalakrishnan	Chitra Productions	K. V. Mahadevan	Gemini Ganesan, Jayalalithaa, Padmini, R. Muthuraman, S. V. Ranga Rao, S. Varalakshmi, Vanisri, Rajasree, Vennira Aadai Nirmala, S. V. Subbaiah, Sridevi
Anbukkor Annan	N. S. Maniam	Karuna Films	M. S. Viswanathan	Gemini Ganesan, Jaishankar, Vennira Aadai Nirmala, Srividya
Annai Velankanni	K. Thangappan	Giri Movies	G. Devarajan	Gemini Ganesan, Jayalalitha, Padmini, K. R. Vijaya, R. Muthuraman, Devika, Nagesh, Thengai Srinivasan, Manorama, Sachu, Sivakumar, Srividya
Arunodhayam	V. Srinivasan	Muktha Films	K. V. Mahadevan	Sivaji Ganesan, B. Saroja Devi, R. Muthuraman, Lakshmi, Cho, Manorama
Arutperunjothi	A. T. Krishnaswamy	Balu Films	T. R. Pappa	Master Sridhar, A. P. Nagarajan, K. A. Thangavelu, M. Saroja, Devaki
Avalukendru Or Manam	C. V. Sridhar	Chitralaya	M. S. Viswanathan	Gemini Ganesan, Bharathi, Kanchana, R. Muthuraman
Babu	A. C. Tirulokchandar	Cine Bharath Productions	M. S. Viswanathan	Sivaji Ganesan, Sowcar Janaki, K. Balaji, Nagesh, Sivakumar, Vennira Aadai Nirmala, Vijayasree
Deivam Pesuma	Chinni Sampath	Bhanu Chitra Productions	Shankar–Ganesh	A. V. M. Rajan, Vennira Aadai Nirmala, Sandhya Rani, Thengai Srinivasan, C. L. Anandhan, V. S. Raghavan, A. Karunanidhi
Iru Thuruvam	S. Ramanathan	P. S. V. Pictures	M. S. Viswanathan	Sivaji Ganesan, Padmini, R. Muthuraman, Nagesh, Rajasree P.S.Veerappa
Irulum Oliyum	S. R. Puttanna	Producers Combine	K. V. Mahadevan	Vanisri, A. V. M. Rajan, R. Muthuraman, Nagesh, Rama Prabha
Justice Viswanathan	G. R. Nathan	Modern Theatres	Vedha	Ravichandran, Major Sundarrajan, C. I. D. Sakunthala, Manimala, Thengai Srinivasan, Manorama
Kankaatchi	A. P. Nagarajan	Sri Vijayalakshmi Pictures	Kunnakudi Vaidyanathan	Sivakumar, Kumari Padmini, K. D. Santhanam, Kallapart Natarajan, A. Sakunthala, Suruli Rajan, Manorama
Kannan Karunai	N. T. Rama Rao			NTR, K. R. Vijaya
Kettikaran	H. S. Venu	Dhandayuthapani Films	Shankar–Ganesh	Jaishankar, Leela, Jayakumari, Nagesh, Major Sundarrajan
Kulama Gunama	K. S. Gopalakrishnan	Aazam Arts	K. V. Mahadevan	Sivaji Ganesan, Jaishankar, Padmini, Vanisri, Nagesh
Kumari Kottam	P. Neelakantan	Kay Cee Films	M. S. Viswanathan	M. G. Ramachandran, Jayalalitha, Lakshmi, Cho, Sachu
Meendum Vazhven	T. N. Balu	Rani Production	M. S. Viswanathan	Ravichandran, Bharathi, Vijaya Lalitha, Nagesh
Muhammad bin Tughluq	Cho	Prestige Productions	M. S. Viswanathan	Cho, Manorama, Sukumari, G. Sakunthala
Moondru Deivangal	Dada Mirasi	Sri Bhuvaneswari Movies	M. S. Viswanathan	Sivaji Ganesan, R. Muthuraman, Nagesh, Sivakumar, Chandrakala
Naangu Suvargal	K. Balachander	Screen Entertainment	M. S. Viswanathan	Jaishankar, Ravichandran, Nagesh, Sowcar Janaki, Vanisri, Vijaya Lalitha, Srividya
Needhi Dhevan	R. Devarajan	Kannan Movies	M. S. Viswanathan	Jaishankar, Rajasree, Vennira Aadai Nirmala
Neerum Neruppum	P. Neelakantan	Manijeh Cine Productions	M. S. Viswanathan	M. G. Ramachandran, Jayalalitha, Thengai Srinivasan, Manorama, S. A. Ashokan
Nootrukku Nooru	K. Balachander	Kalakendra Production	V. Kumar	Jaishankar, Nagesh, Lakshmi, Vijaya Lalitha, Srividya, Jayakumari
Oru Thai Makkal	P. Neelakantan	Naanjil Productions	M. S. Viswanathan	M. G. Ramachandran, Jayalalitha, R. Muthuraman, Udaya Chandrika, Cho
Pattondru Ketten	S. Raghavan	Kesavan Films	C. Ramachandra	A. V. M. Rajan, Rajasree, Nagesh
Poi Sollathey	L. Balu	Jothi Chithra Productions	K. V. Mahadevan	Ravichandran, Rajasree
Praptham	Savitri	Sri Savitri Production	M. S. Viswanathan	Sivaji Ganesan, Savitri, Srikant Chandrakala, Nagesh
Pudhiya Vazhkai	C. V. Rajendran	Babu Movies	K.V. Mahadevan	Jaishankar, Jayabharathi, R. Muthuraman, A. Sakunthala, Nagesh, Sachu
Punnagai	K. Balachander	Amutham Pictures	M. S. Viswanathan	Gemini Ganesan, Nagesh, R. Muthuraman, Jayanthi, A. Sakunthala
Ranga Rattinam	Krishnan–Panju	S. J. Films	V. Kumar	Gemini Ganesan, Sowcar Janaki, Ravichandran, K. A. Thangavelu
Rickshawkaran	M. Krishnan	Sathya Movies	M. S. Viswanathan	M. G. Ramachandran, Manjula, Padmini, Cho, Thengai Srinivasan
Sabatham	P. Madhavan	Devanayaki Films	G. K. Venkatesh	K. R. Vijaya, Ravichandran, Nagesh, T. K. Bhagavathy, Anjali Devi
Savaale Samali	Malliyam Rajagopal	Malliyam Productions	M. S. Viswanathan	Sivaji Ganesan, Jayalalitha, Nagesh, C. R. Vijayakumari
Sudarum Sooravaliyum	S. R. Puttanna	AVM Productions, Chithramala Combines	M. S. Viswanathan	Gemini Ganesan, R. Muthuraman, Vennira Aadai Nirmala, Chandra Mohan, Jaya Guhanathan
Soodhattam	'Madurai' Thirumaran	Manohar Films	M. S. Viswanathan	Jaishankar, K. R. Vijaya, R. Muthuraman, Cho, Vennira Aadai Nirmala, Sivakumar
Sumathi En Sundari	C. V. Rajendran	Ramkumar Films	M. S. Viswanathan	Sivaji Ganesan, Jayalalitha, Nagesh, K. A. Thangavelu, Thengai Srinivasan, Sachu
Thanga Gopuram	M. S. Solaimalai	Mohan Pictures	S. M. Subbaiah Naidu	Jaishankar, Jayalalitha, Major Sundarrajan, Vennira Aadai Nirmala, Srividya, M. R. R. Vasu, Manorama
Thangaikkaaga	D. Yoganand	Jupiter Art Movies	M. S. Viswanathan	Sivaji Ganesan, Vennira Aadai Nirmala, Lakshmi, R. Muthuraman, Nagesh
Then Kinnam	K. Krishnamoorthy	Sri Chithra Mahal Productions	Shankar–Ganesh	Nagesh, Vijaya Lalitha, V. K. Ramasamy, M. R. R. Vasu, Suruli Rajan, Vijaya Chandrika
Thenum Paalum	P. Madhavan	Kasthuri Films	M. S. Viswanathan	Sivaji Ganesan, Padmini, B. Saroja Devi, Nagesh, Sachu
Therottam	V. T. Arasu	Shasti Films	S. M. Subbaiah Naidu	Gemini Ganesan, Padmini, Cho, Manorama, Sivakumar
Thirumagal	T. R. Raghunath	Govindarajaa Films	K. V. Mahadevan	Gemini Ganesan, Padmini, A. V. M. Rajan, Lakshmi, Nagesh, Sivakumar, M. Bhanumathi
Thulli Odum Pullimaan	A. B. Raj	Nadarajan Pictures	K. V. Mahadevan	Ravichandran, Lakshmi, Thengai Srinivasan, M. A. Radhika
Uttharavindri Ulle Vaa	N. C. Chakravarthy	Chitralaya Pictures	M. S. Viswanathan	Ravichandran, Kanchana, Nagesh, Rama Prabha, Thengai Srinivasan, Vennira Aadai Moorthy, Sachu
Uyir	Somasundar	T. V. S. Productions	R. Sridhar	R. Muthuraman, B. Saroja Devi, Lakshmi
Veettukoru Pillai	T. R. Ramanna	Raman Pictures	M. S. Viswanathan	Jaishankar, Ushanandini, Nagesh, Shashi Kumar, Manohar, M. R. R. Vasu
Veguli Penn	S. S. Devadas	Jennat Combines	V. Kumar	Gemini Ganesan, Devika, R. Muthuraman, Vennira Aadai Nirmala, Nagesh, M. A. Radhika, Sachu
Yaanai Valartha Vaanampadi Magan	P. Subramaniam	Neelaa Productions	K. V. Mahadevan	Gemini Ganesan, Rajasree, Master Prabhakar, 'Baby' Sridevi
