= Lillian Lorraine =

American film actress (c.1893–1955)

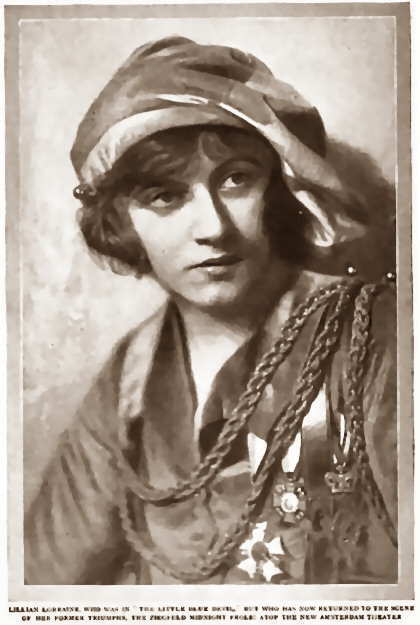
- in Munsey's Magazine, 1920
- Born: Lillian (sometimes spelled Ealallean) Jacques; 1892/1894; Utah, U.S.
- Died: April 17, 1955 (age 61/63); New York City, NY, U.S.
- Resting place: Saint Raymond's Cemetery, Bronx County, New York City, NY, U.S.
- Other names: Mary Ann Brennan; Lillian O'Brien
- Occupation: Actress
- Years active: 1906–1922
- Spouse: Frederick M. Gresheimer (m. 1913; ann. 1913)
- Partner: Jack O'Brien (1946-55)

Lillian Lorraine (née Jacques; 1892/1894 – April 17, 1955) was an American stage and screen actress of the 1910s and 1920s, and a prominent Ziegfeld Girl in the Broadway revues Ziegfeld Follies during the 1910s.

== Early years ==
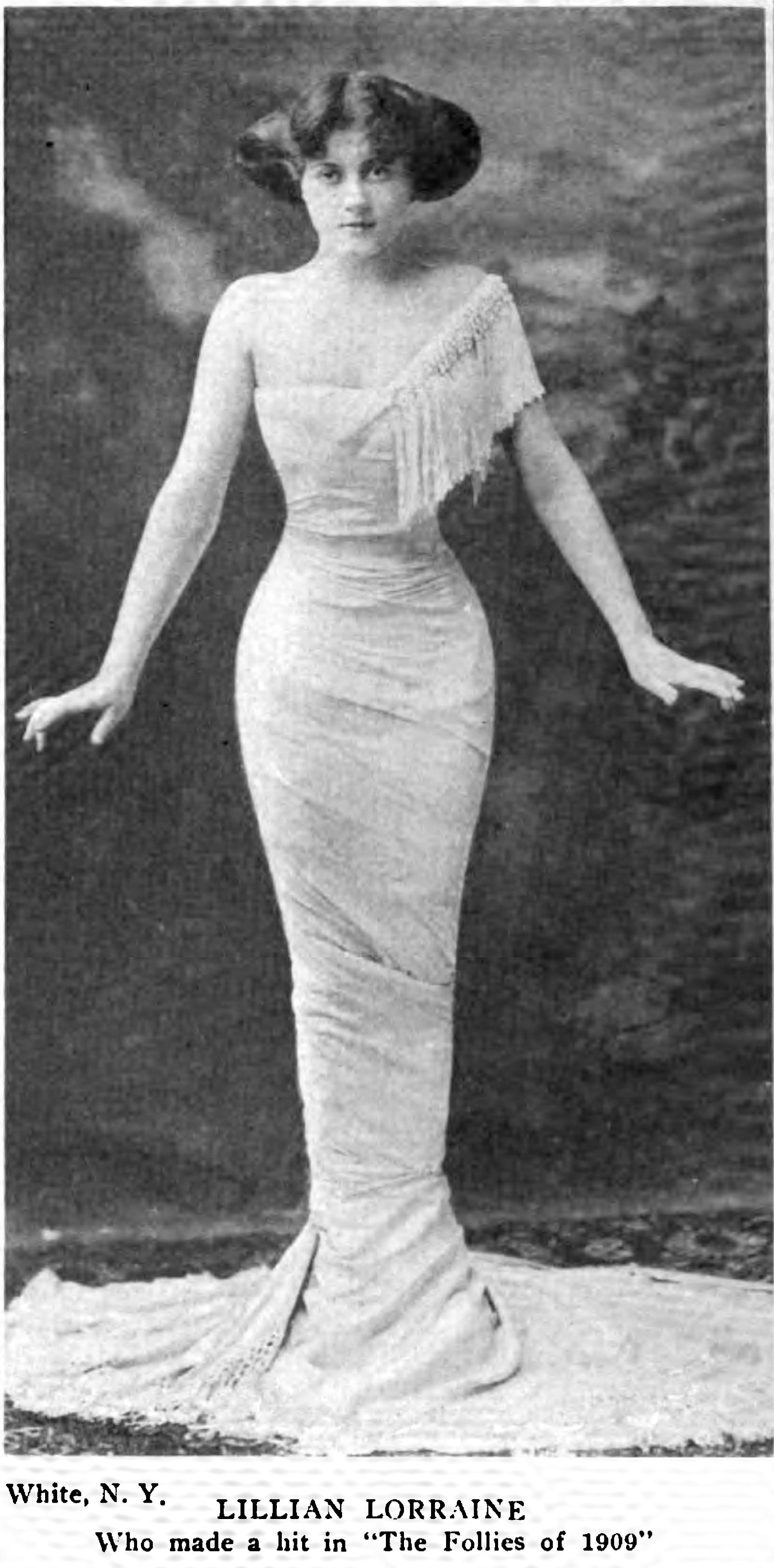
Theatre Magazine, 1909

Lorraine was born in Utah, most likely as Lillian (sometimes transcribed as Ealallean) Jacques to Mollie and Charles Jacques (or De Jacques). Her father was a miner whose roots were in St. Louis. Her mother's maiden name may have been Mary Ann Brennan. The U.S. census of 1900 shows that she and her parents resided in Leadville, Colorado, at her maternal step-grandfather's hotel, giving her birthdate as January 1894, her age as 6, her name as Lillian Jacque [sic], and her place of birth as Utah. The 1910 census and the Motion Picture Studio Directories, 1919 and 1921 both give her year of birth as 1892. Lillian herself told a journalist in an interview that she had been born in San Francisco on New Year's Day in 1892 and lived there for her first 14 years, which her official biographer, Nils Hanson, accepted.

== Career ==
She began her career on stage in 1906, aged 12 or 14. The following year, she appeared as a minor performer in a Shubert production, The Tourists. It was in that show that she was discovered by Florenz Ziegfeld. At some point, she had become known as Lillian (or Lillie) Lorraine. He spent the next several years promoting her career, rocketing her into an ascendance that made her one of the most popular attractions in his Follies. In 1909, Ziegfeld pulled the teenaged Lorraine from the chorus line in that year's production of Miss Innocence to spotlight her as a solo performer who became celebrated for introducing the song "By the Light of the Silvery Moon".

Lorraine starred in many annual productions of The Ziegfeld Follies as well as the 1912 Broadway musical Over the River. She ventured into motion pictures with limited success, appearing in about ten films between 1912 and 1922, including the serial Neal of the Navy with William Courtleigh, Jr. Although the affair she'd had with Ziegfeld was over by the end of the 1910s, her box-office drawing power kept her in a number of his productions of the period. Lorraine's fame began waning in the 1920s, and she worked for a period in vaudeville.

== Personal life ==
Lorraine's personal life received frequent press coverage, including reports about her relationships and public disputes with performers such as Fanny Brice and Sophie Tucker.

In his book Scandals and Follies, author Lee Davis writes that, "By 1911, [Ziegfeld] was insanely in love with Lillian Lorraine and would remain so, to one degree or another, for the rest of his life, despite her erratic, irresponsible, often senseless behavior, her multiple marriages [sic] to other men, his own two marriages and his need for all his adult life to sleep with the best of the beauties he hired." The relationship, both professional and romantic, between Ziegfeld and Lorraine, reportedly led to the demise of his relationship with Anna Held. Lorraine and Ziegfeld's relationship was turbulent and emotionally complex, but their passion was such that Ziegfeld's second wife, actress Billie Burke, confessed that Lorraine was the only one of Ziegfeld's past sexual entanglements that aroused her jealousy.

=== Marriages ===
Lorraine married Frederick M. Gresheimer, on March 27, 1912, after they met on a beach. Ten days later, Lorraine announced that the marriage had been a mistake and that the couple was "incompatible" due to her career. The marriage was later found to be invalid because Gresheimer had not divorced his first wife. Lorraine and Gresheimer remarried in May 1913. Three months later, Lorraine filed to have the marriage annulled after claiming that Gresheimer misrepresented himself.

Around 1946, she reportedly wed Jack O'Brien, an accountant. According to Lorraine's biographer, Nils Hanson, no record of any such marriage exists, and the marriage was likely common-law.

== Final years and death ==
Lorraine disappeared from public view in 1941, sometimes going by her mother's purported maiden name, Mary Ann Brennan. She died on April 17, 1955, in New York City, aged either 61 or 63. Her funeral, which was held at Holy Name of Jesus Catholic Church, was attended by Jack O'Brien and two friends. She initially was buried in a pauper's grave in Calvary Cemetery in Queens, New York. Her body later was exhumed and moved to a friend's family plot in Saint Raymond's Cemetery, Bronx.

== Broadway credits ==
Date	Production	Role
November 30, 1908 - May 1, 1909	Miss Innocence	Angele
June 14 - August 7, 1909	Ziegfeld Follies of 1909	Performer
June 20 - September 3, 1910	Ziegfeld Follies of 1910	Performer
June 26 - September 2, 1911	Ziegfeld Follies of 1911	Performer
January 8 - April 20, 1912	Over the River	Myrtle Mirabeau
October 21, 1912 - January 4, 1913	Ziegfeld Follies of 1912	Performer
January 10 - May 30, 1914	The Whirl of the World	Fifi, Cleopatra II
November 19, 1917 - February 23, 1918	Odds and Ends of 1917	Performer
Jun 18, 1918 - Closing date unknown	Ziegfeld Follies of 1918	Performer
July 1918 - Closing date unknown	Ziegfeld Midnight Frolic	Performer
November 3, 1919 - January 3, 1920	The Little Blue Devil	Paulette Divine
March 8 - May 1920	Ziegfeld Girls of 1920	Performer
January 13 - May 13, 1922	The Blue Kitten	Totoche

== Filmography ==
Year	Title	Role	Notes
1912	The Immigrant's Violin	Lora - Albert's Sweetheart	Short film
1912	Dublin Dan	The Old Hag	Short film
1912	The Face at the Window		Short film
1913	The Detective's Santa Claus	Miss Steele	Short film
1913	The Old Parlor		Short film
1915	Neal of the Navy	Annette Illington	Lost serial
1915	Should a Wife Forgive?	La Belle Rose	print held by Library of Congress
1917	The Prima Donna's Special	The Prima Donna	Short film Alternative title: The Hazards of Helen (#118): The Prima Donna's Special
1918	Playing the Game		Lost film
1922	Lonesome Corners	Martha Forrest	Lost film

== In popular culture ==
- The first biography of Lorraine, Lillian Lorraine: The Life and Times of a Ziegfeld Diva by Nils Hanson, was published in October 2011 by McFarland Press.
- Lorraine was portrayed by Valerie Perrine in the 1978 film Ziegfeld: The Man and His Women (Columbia Pictures).
- Lorraine is mentioned as an acquaintance of characters in Jennifer Egan's 2017 novel Manhattan Beach (New York: Scribner Press).

== Footnotes ==
=== References ===
- Hanson, Nils (September 1, 2011), Lillian Lorraine, The Life and Times of a Ziegfeld Diva, MacFarland & Company, ISBN 978-0786464074
