= Virginia Hammond =

American film and theatre actress (1893–1972)

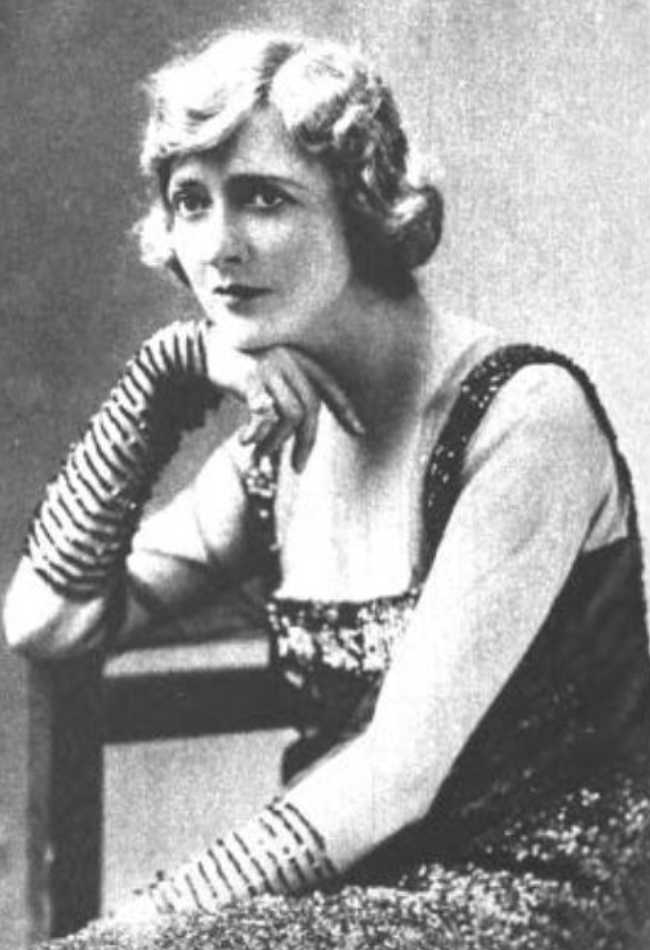
- Virginia Hammond, from Theatre Magazine, June 1920
- Born: August 20, 1893; Staunton, Virginia, U.S.
- Died: April 6, 1972 (aged 78); Washington, D.C., U.S.
- Occupations: Film and theatre actress
- Years active: 1907–1947

Virginia Hammond (August 20, 1893 – April 6, 1972) was an American film and theatre actress. Her stage name is from the State of Virginia, and her mother’s maiden name.

== Early life ==
Hammond was born as Louise Shumate in Staunton, Virginia, into an Virginia Huguenot family, as the daughter of a Confederate army major, Thomas Jackson Shumate (originally: de la Chaumette) who died shortly after her birth. Hammond was raised by her mother in Oskaloosa, Iowa. Hammond attended school at Penn College, then Miss Blood’s School of Oratory, and Hinshaw’s Dramatic School, both in Chicago. Hammond auditioned for E.H. Sothern and Julia Marlowe.

== Career ==
Hammond began her career in 1907, where she made her theatre debut in the Broadway play, titled, John the Baptist. She continued her career, mainly appearing on theatre, in which her credits includes, Our American Cousin, The Famous Mrs. Fair, Tumble In, What's Your Husband Doing?, The Man Who Came to Dinner, Arsène Lupin, What the Doctor Ordered and Desert Sands, among others. Her final theatre credit was from the Broadway play, titled, Craig's Wife, in which she played the role of "Mrs. Frazier", in 1947.

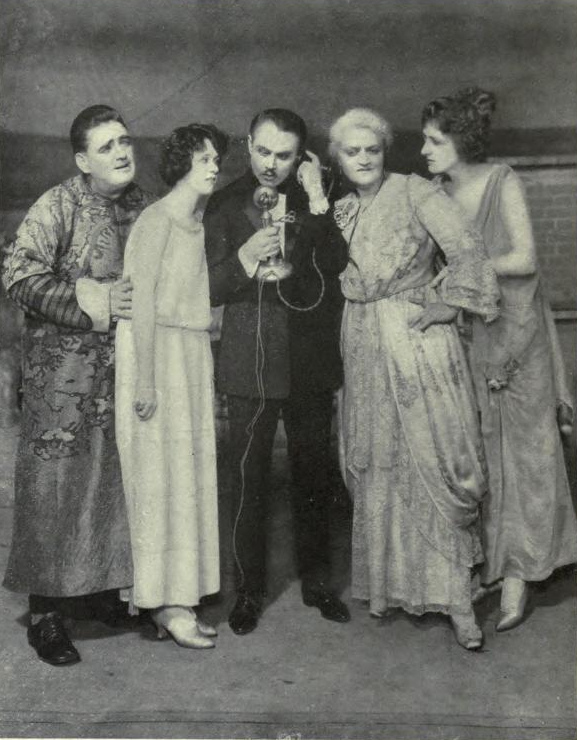
Hammond (right) with Herbert Corthell, Edna Hibbard, Charlie Ruggles and Zelda Sears in Tumble In, 1919

Hammond then began her film career in 1916, when she appeared in the silent film Vultures of Society, in which she played the role of "Mrs. Upperwon". In her film career, Hammond starred and co-starred in films, such as, Anybody's Woman, The Great Impersonation, The Virginia Judge, The Kiss, Charlie Chan's Courage and Chandu the Magician. Her final credit was from 1936 film Romeo and Juliet, in which she played the role of "Lady Montague.

== Personal life ==
She was actress Edna May Oliver's best friend.

Hammond died in April 1972 in Washington, D.C., at the age of 78. She was buried in Fort Lincoln Cemetery.
