= The Rainbow Princess =

1916 film by J. Searle Dawley

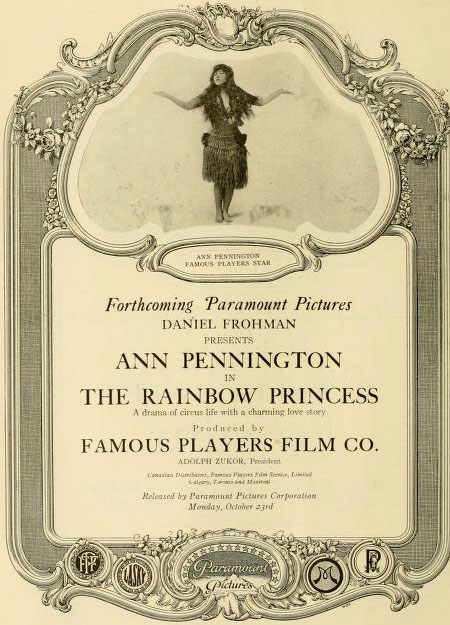
- "The Rainbow Princess"
- Directed by: J. Searle Dawley
- Written by: Shannon Fife
- Produced by: Daniel Frohman; Adolph Zukor
- Starring: Ann Pennington
- Cinematography: H. Lyman Broening (fr)
- Distributed by: Paramount Pictures
- Release date: October 22, 1916
- Running time: 50 minutes
- Country: USA
- Language: Silent..English intertitles

The Rainbow Princess is a lost American silent film released by the Famous Players Film Company on October 22, 1916. The picture was directed by J. Searle Dawley and filmed by cinematographer H. Lyman Broening. The Rainbow Princess was written by Shannon Fife and marked actress Ann Pennington's second appearance on celluloid.

== Reception ==
The Moving Picture World, 1916

After her very successful debut in Susie Snowflake it was decided to star Miss Pennington in a circus story to be called The Rainbow Princess which is being staged under the direction of J. Searle Dawley. In this picture Miss Pennington plays a little waif who has been adopted by the wife of the proprietor of a circus and is forced to do a great deal of the mean work around the place in addition to learning to do tricks with the animals. Of course there is a lover among the men in the troupe but The Princess, realizing that he is not quite sincere in his attentions, has the good sense to refuse to accept his attentions. She later proves to be not at all the waif that she was thought to be and—but the story is one to be seen on the screen.

The production of this photoplay at this particular time has caused many unexpected difficulties to be placed in the path of Director Dawley, because of the strict quarantines which have been placed upon itinerant citizens because of the paralysis plague. As a result of these numerous obstacles, Mr. Dawley was forced to arrange with one of the circuses which was on Long Island to have it apparently disband and travel back to New York in small units, with the Famous Players studio as their rendezvous. Then the tent was set up in a large vacant lot on the west side and the scenes were taken.

Miss Pennington, who is a remarkably clever athlete and is a trained acrobat, has already done some very startling feats in the "show" and she predicts that she will accomplish even more before the end of the picture

Forest Leaves, 1916

When Ann Pennington was creating a sensation on the stage of the Ziegfeld Follies, the little star decided that she had enough spare time to become a motion picture satellite, constellation or luminary. She accordingly made her debut in Susie Snowflake, in which she scored a decided success. The circus with all the background of billowing canvas, the freaks, the menagerie, the balloon ascent and the parachute drop – all of these and much more that is fascinating – form the setting for the Rainbow Princess. Miss Pennington goes into the lion’s cage, performs aerial tricks, does her celebrated Hula Hula Dance and is her captivating self throughout the entire picture.

== Cast ==
- Ann Pennington ... Hope
- William Courtleigh, Jr. ... Warren Reynolds
- Augusta Anderson ... Edithe Worthington
- Grant Stewart ... Judge Daingerfield
- Charles Sutton ... Pop Blodgett
- Harry Lee ... Dave, his son
- Eddie Sturgis ... Joe, his son (as Edwin Sturgis)
- Clifford Grey ... George Waters (as Clifford Gray)
- Herbert Rice ... Monsieur Paul
- Queen Pearl ... Mademoiselle Fifi
- Amy Manning ... Rose, the fat lady
- Carl Gordon ... Simon, the skeleton
- Walter D. Nealand ... Hawkes

Source, IMDb.com
