= Atom Squad =

- Genre: Science fiction
- Written by: Paul Monash
- Theme music composer: Miklós Rózsa
- Opening theme: "Tumult and Commotion"
- Country of origin: United States
- Original language: English
- No. of seasons: 1
- No. of episodes: 142

Production
- Camera setup: Multi-camera
- Running time: 15 mins.

Original release
- Network: NBC
- Release: July 6, 1953 – January 22, 1954

Atom Squad is an American science fiction television series that was broadcast live five times a week by the NBC network (out of their Philadelphia studios), Monday July 6, 1953, to January 22, 1954, running Monday through Friday, 5:00 to 5:15 pm EST. Each episode was only 15 minutes long, with a total of 142 black and white episodes.

== Synopsis ==
The Atom Squad is a secret government agency that dealt with Cold War threats to US security involving radiation and nuclear weapons. The Atom Squad scientists, Steve Elliot and Dave Fielding, were respectively played by Robert Courtleigh and Bob Hastings, their chief by Bram Nossem.

The Atom Squad's secret New York City headquarters laboratory looked very much like Captain Video's secret mountain headquarters control room. The program's opening sequence showed a man in a "radiation suit" lumbering very slowly toward the camera.

== Production notes ==
Storylines were usually completed in five, or sometimes 10 broadcasts. Paul Monash was the chief writer for the series and possibly its creator. The foes of the Atom Squad were usually mad scientists and evil Communist spies and saboteurs. However, the Squad ran into aliens from outer space in at least three different storylines.

Atom Squad originated from the studios of WPTZ in Philadelphia. The director was Joe Behar, and producers were Larry White and later Adrian Samish.

The theme music for the series was "Tumult and Commotion", an excerpt from Miklos Rozsa's orchestral work "Theme, Variations and Finale, Op. 13". The opening theme music (man in "radiation suit") was taken from original music by Serge Prokofiev for the Sergei Eisenstein film Alexander Nevsky.
