= Neal of the Navy =

1915 film

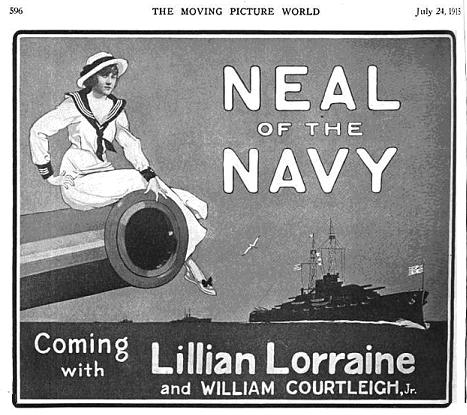
- Moving Picture World, 1915
- Directed by: William Bertram; W. M. Harvey
- Written by: Douglas Bronston; William Hamilton Osborne
- Starring: William Courtleigh, Jr. Lillian Lorraine
- Distributed by: Balboa Amusement Producing Company
- Release date: September 2, 1915
- Running time: 14 episodes
- Country: United States
- Languages: Silent; English intertitles

Neal of the Navy is a 1915 American adventure film serial directed by William Bertram and W. M. Harvey. The film is considered to be lost. Neal of the Navy was the first use of a man's name in the title of a serial.

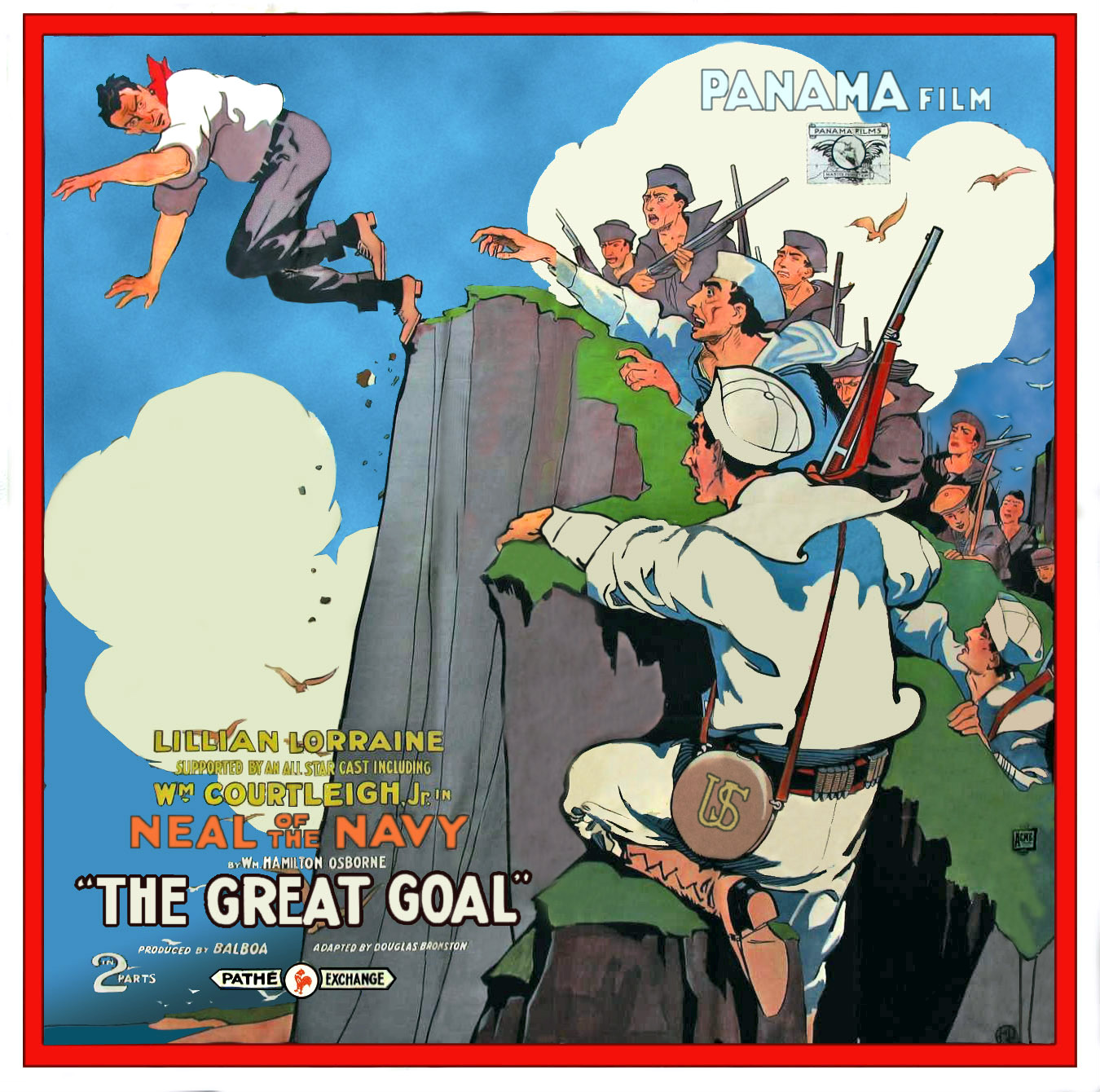
Film poster for the two part feature

== Plot ==
An Annapolis cadet is thrown out of the Naval Academy for cheating on an exam. He was framed, but he must enlist in the Navy to clear himself. Meanwhile, he and his sweetheart search for a buried treasure on Lost Island, which everyone is after.

A map is torn.

== Cast ==
- William Courtleigh, Jr. as Neal Hardin
- Lillian Lorraine as Annette Illington
- William Conklin as Thomas Illington
- Ed Brady as Hernandez
- Henry Stanley as Ponto
- Richard Johnson as Joe Welcher
- Charles Dudley
- Helen Lackaye as Mrs. Hardin
- Bruce Smith as Captain John Hardin
- Lucy Blake
- Philo McCullough (unconfirmed)

== See also ==
- List of film serials
- List of film serials by studio
- List of lost films
