= Shannon Fife =

American journalist

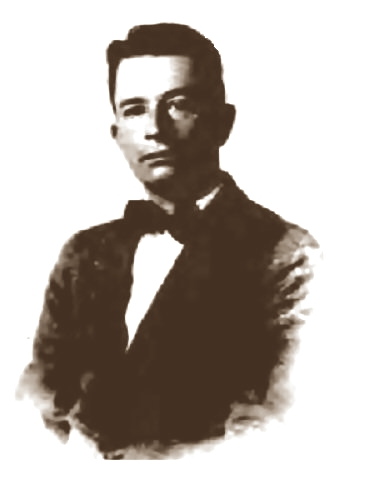
- Shannon Fife; US Passport Photograph (1920)
- Born: Manning Shannon Fife; February 16, 1888; Dallas, Texas, USA
- Died: May 7, 1972 (aged 84); Dallas, Texas, USA
- Other name: Manning S. Fife
- Occupations: Journalist and screenwriter

Manning Shannon Fife (February 16, 1888 – May 7, 1972) was an American journalist, humorist and film scenario writer. He worked on at least 86 motion pictures over the silent film era before returning to journalism to write for magazines and newspapers.

== Biography ==
He was born on February 16, 1888, in Dallas, Texas, the middle of three boys born to Ambrose D. and Mary Shannon Fife. By the turn of the twentieth century, Fife and his two brothers (Locksley and Francis) were living in Dallas with an uncle and their maternal grandmother, Belle Shannon. His father, a well-known Dallas businessman, died in 1911. Fife first worked as a cub reporter for the Dallas Dispatch, where he quickly rose to be city editor.

Fife's first movie, A Message from the Moon, was written in 1912 for Mack Sennett at Biograph Studios before joining the Lubin Company for several years. By 1916 he was a freelance writer working on such films as Susie Snowflake and The Rainbow Princess, former Ziegfeld Follies star Ann Pennington's debut pictures. That same year Fife co-wrote The Habit of Happiness, a comedy starring Douglas Fairbanks, Sr. In 1918 Fife's film career was interrupted for a short period while he served as a sergeant over the waning months of the First World War at Camp Travis, a division of Fort Sam Houston in San Antonio.

Fife remained busy throughout the silent era until his health began to fail in the late 1920s. In 1928 he was reported to be home in Dallas recuperating from an unspecified illness, and by 1930 he was listed as a patient at the Loomis Sanatorium in Liberty, New York. His health did improve though, for a little over a year later he was reported slightly injured with Dr. Godfrey Dewey and others while testing an Olympic bob sled course at Lake Placid, New York. Fife's last film, the 1929 Hoot Gibson comedy Smilin' Guns, was an adaption of a popular magazine story he wrote. The latter half of Fife's career would be spent in journalism writing for magazines such as Esquire and syndicated articles in newspapers. He was noted for his one- or two-line quips on modern life – e.g., All agree that a woman’s blush is becoming, some insist it is becoming obsolete – Some college graduates who think they have drunk at the Fountain of Knowledge seemed to have only gargled – that were published in American newspapers and magazines for many years.

Manning Shannon Fife died on May 7, 1972, in Dallas, Texas, aged 84.

== Filmography ==
- Red, White and Blue Blood (1917)
- Maternity (1917)
- The Song of the Soul (1918)
- Johnny-on-the-Spot (1919)
- Man and His Woman (1920)
- Second Hand Love (1923)
- Hard Boiled (1926)
