= The Kiss (1916 film) =

1916 silent film directed by Dell Henderson

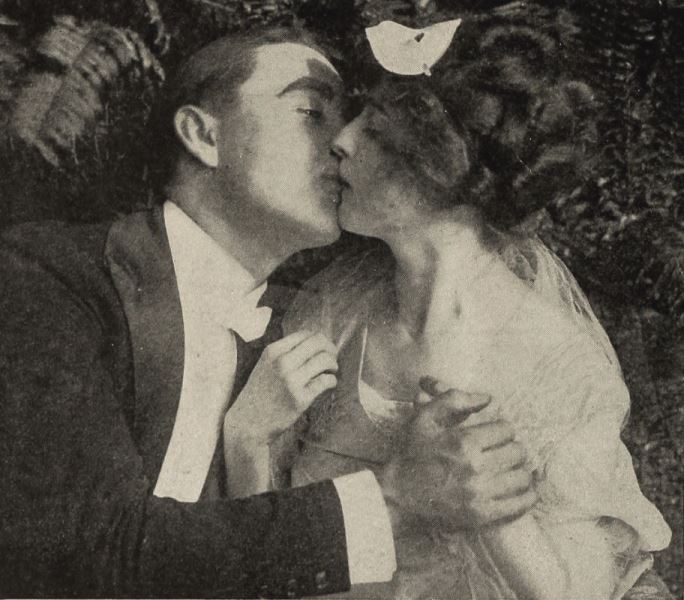
- Still with Moore and Courtot
- Directed by: Dell Henderson
- Screenplay by: Harvey F. Thew
- Story by: Elizabeth Frazer
- Produced by: Daniel Frohman
- Starring: Owen Moore; Marguerite Courtot; Kate Lester; Virginia Hammond; Adolphe Menjou; Thomas O'Keefe
- Cinematography: Lewis Physioc
- Production company: Famous Players Film Company
- Distributed by: Paramount Pictures
- Release date: October 19, 1916
- Running time: 50 minutes
- Country: United States
- Languages: Silent; English intertitles

The Kiss is a surviving 1916 American silent comedy film directed by Dell Henderson and written by Harvey F. Thew. The film stars Owen Moore, Marguerite Courtot, Kate Lester, Virginia Hammond, Adolphe Menjou, and Thomas O'Keefe. The film was released on October 19, 1916, by Paramount Pictures.

== Cast ==
- Owen Moore as Jean-Marie
- Marguerite Courtot as Luise
- Kate Lester as Grandma Van Vechten
- Virginia Hammond as Mrs. Jack Van Vechten
- Adolphe Menjou as Pennington
- Thomas O'Keefe as Detective Barnes
- Viola Trent as Society Girl
- Frances Kaye as Society Girl
- Elsie Lewis as Society Girl
- Florence Hamilton as Society Girl
- Ellen Burford as Society Girl (credited as Ellen Cassidy)
- Ethel Fleming as Society Girl
- Rita Spear as Society Girl
- Gus Weinberg

== Preservation ==
A print of The Kiss is preserved in the Library of Congress collection Packard Campus for Audio-Visual Conservation.
