= Kasturi Thilakam =

- Theatrical release poster
- Directed by: Malliyam Rajagopal
- Screenplay by: Malliyam Rajagopal
- Based on: Aalamaram by Bilahari
- Produced by: Raju M. Mathan
- Starring: Sowcar Janaki; Major Sundarrajan; Nagesh
- Music by: G. Devarajan
- Production company: Kavitha Arts
- Release date: 8 August 1970
- Country: India
- Language: Tamil

Kasturi Thilakam (transl. Holy mark of musk) is a 1970 Indian Tamil-language film written and directed by Malliyam Rajagopal. The film stars Sowcar Janaki, Major Sundarrajan and Nagesh. It is based on the play Aalamaram by Bilahari. The film was released on 8 August 1970.

== Plot ==
Pannaiyar arranges the marriage of his sister Kasturi to Minor Mohanasundaram. Over the years, the couple have three children – Somu, Balu and Thangam. Pannaiyar has one daughter, Thilagam. Pichhai works for the families. While Minor does care for his family, his priority is gambling. Due to this, the family loses most of their money and good name. Somu is a lazy layabout. Balu studies well and gets a job in the city. He is also in love with Thilagam. Pannaiyar approves of their eventual marriage but is disappointed by the state of his sister's family. He shoulders all of the financial burdens of his sister's family and also arranges for the marriages of Somu and Thangam. Due to Pichhai's inability to lie or hold his tongue, the future in-law family learns the truth of Minor's as well as Somu's behavior and calls off the wedding. An embarrassed Somu blames Pannaiyar for lying while arranging the marriages and setting him up for humiliation. In defending himself, Pannaiyar points out Minor's many failures. The ever-loyal Kasturi defends her husband and the situation descends into chaos. Somu leaves the family after demanding his share of whatever is left of the family fortune. Pannaiyar decides to cut off all contact with Kasturi's family – including ending Balu and Thilagam's engagement. Pichhai's constant revealing of utterances made by the two families to each other only fuels the resentments further. Somu manages to land a job in the same office as Balu and as his brother's manager to boot. He insists that Balu not reveal their family connection. Somu is attracted Roopa, a typist at work, and assaults her. Balu is blamed for this and fired. Minor falls even further into debt, forcing Kasturi to ask Pannaiyar for help. Thilagam and Balu clearly still love each other but are also loyal to their respective families and allow misunderstandings to fester. The film follows the twists and turns of these two families' journey to its conclusion.

== Cast ==
- Sowcar Janaki as Kasturi
- Major Sundarrajan as Minor Mohanasundaram
- Nagesh as Pichhai
- Sivakumar as Balu
- Srividya as Thangam
- Lakshmi as Thilagam
- Kumari Padmini as Roopa
- Kallapart Natarajan as Somu
- V. S. Raghavan as Pannaiyar

== Production ==
Kasturi Thilakam was written and directed by Malliyam Rajagopal, and produced by Raju M. Mathan under Kavitha Arts. Although Sivakumar and Srividya usually played lovers in films, this was the only film where they played siblings. The final length of the film was initially 4,876.18 metres (15,998.0 ft), but this was reduced to 4,441.00 metres (14,570.21 ft).

== Soundtrack ==
The soundtrack was composed by G. Devarajan.
