= Love Insurance =

1919 film by Donald Crisp

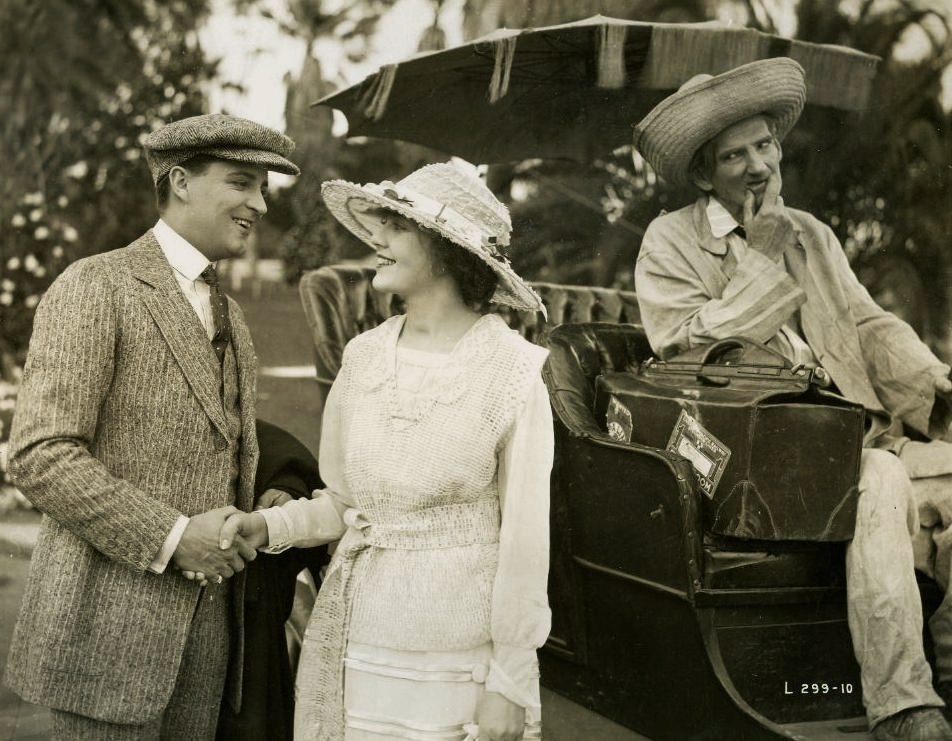
- Bryant Washburn, Lois Wilson and John Cossar
- Directed by: Donald Crisp
- Written by: Marion Fairfax (scenario)
- Based on: Love Insurance by Earl Derr Biggers
- Produced by: Adolph Zukor; Jesse Lasky
- Cinematography: Charles Schoenbaum (as C. Edgar Schoenbaum)
- Distributed by: Paramount Pictures
- Release date: August 17, 1919
- Running time: 5 reels
- Country: United States
- Language: Silent (English intertitles)

Love Insurance is a lost 1919 American silent comedy film directed by Donald Crisp, produced by Famous Players–Lasky and distributed by Paramount Pictures. It is based on the novel of the same name by Earl Derr Biggers, Love Insurance.

Love Insurance was later remade in 1924 as The Reckless Age and in the sound era in 1940 as One Night in the Tropics.

== Plot ==
As described in a film magazine, Lord Allan Harrowby, upon arriving in America to wed an heiress, goes to the New York office of Lloyd's of London and insures against the lady changing her mind. Dick Minot, assistant manager of the office, is assigned to the task of preventing that occurrence. He meets Cynthia Meyrick, the lady in question, but not knowing her identity falls in love with her. However, business is his first thought and when she decides that she does not love her fiancé and is about to break her engagement, he does all in his power to bring about the wedding. This involves defeating a stranger who claims to be the real Lord Harrowby, outwitting a customs official who seeks to arrest the nobleman for smuggling in a diamond necklace, the routing of a clever criminal who tries to steal the necklace, and effecting the dismissal of a young woman who threatens a suit for breach of promise. After all this is effected and the wedding about to proceed, Cynthia again changes her mind, but this time it is because of an act by Harrowby. By the terms of the policy, this releases the company, so Dick presents his own case to Cynthia, which she accepts and they elope.

== Cast ==
- Bryant Washburn as Dick Minot
- Lois Wilson as Cynthia Meyrick
- Theodore Roberts as Spencer Meyrick
- Frances Raymond as Mary Meyrick
- Frank Elliott as Allan Harrowby
- Edwin Stevens as Martin Wall
- Clarence Geldart as George Harrowby
- A. Edward Sutherland as Jack Paddock
- P. Dempsey Tabler as Hunt
- Fred E. Wright as O'Malley
- Edward Alexander as Jarvis
- Wilton Taylor as Stacy
- Fred Huntley as Jenkins
- Willard Louis as Trimmer
- Ethel Fleming as Gabrielle
