= Sange Muzhangu =

1972 film by P. Neelakantan

- Poster
- Directed by: P. Neelakantan
- Screenplay by: K. S. Gopalakrishnan
- Produced by: S. Ramakrishnan
- Starring: M. G. Ramachandran; Lakshmi
- Cinematography: V. Ramamoorthy
- Edited by: K. Narayanan
- Music by: M. S. Viswanathan
- Production company: Valli Films
- Release date: 4 February 1972
- Running time: 156 minutes
- Country: India
- Language: Tamil

Sange Muzhangu (transl. Blow the conch shell) is a 1972 Indian Tamil-language action thriller film directed by P. Neelakantan, starring M. G. Ramachandran, with S. A. Ashokan, Lakshmi, and Cho Ramaswamy. Kamal Haasan worked under K. Thangappan as his dance assistant in this film. It is a remake of the Bengali film Jiban Mrityu.

== Plot ==
Murugan is an innocent man who meets Latha at an airport. They start fighting, but then fall in love. He is a fugitive who is involved in the murder of his employer. With help from Pratap Singh, he takes the place of Kripal Singh, who is Pratap's sister's son scheduled to appear for IPS from London, who had died in an accident. He writes and clears the exams and is assigned to investigate Murugan's case. He takes up the role, investigates, and in the end exposes the real culprits.

== Cast ==
- M. G. Ramachandran as Murugan, (alais Mohammed and alias Kirpal Singh)
- Lakshmi as Latha, Murugan's lover
- T. K. Bhagavathi as Pratap Singh, Latha's father
- V. K. Ramasamy as Varagaswamy, an Advocate and Natarajan's friend
- S. A. Ashokan as Natarajan, the director
- V. S. Raghavan as Dhayalan, the jeweler, the foster father of Murugan and Sivagami
- Cho Ramaswamy as Cinthamani, Murugan's friend
- C. R. Parthiban as D.I.G. of Police
- Jaya Kausalya (Baby Jaya Gowsalya) as Sivagami, Murugan's sister
- G. Sakunthala as Visalam, Varagaswamy's wife
- 'Baby' Sridevi as Sivagami (child)
- Karikol Raju
- K. D. Santhanam as The judge in the final scene
- Kallapart Natarajan as Sekhar, Murugan's brother-in-law
- S. V. Ramadas as The aggressor of the airport
- K. Kannan
- Gundu Karuppiah as Thangasamy
- S. Rama Rao as Varagaswamy's junior
- Kumari Nirmala as Sivagami
- Master Babu as Murugan (child)
- T. K. S. Chandran as Mohan, Dayalan's son
- Helen as cabaret dancer

== Soundtrack ==
The music was composed by M. S. Viswanathan.

All lyrics are written by Kannadasan.

No.	Title	Singer(s)	Length
1.	"Pombala Sirichapochu"	T. M. Soundararajan	03:37
2.	"Irandu Kangal"	S. P. Balasubrahmanyam, P. Susheela	03:20
3.	"Naam Solliththara"	L. R. Eswari	03:18
4.	"Naalu Perukku (Ullathil)"	T. M. Soundararajan	03:30
5.	"Thamizhil Athu Oru"	T. M. Soundararajan, P. Susheela	04:01
6.	"Silar Kudippathupole"	T. M. Soundararajan, L. R. Eswari	03:34
