= Ethel Fleming =

American actress

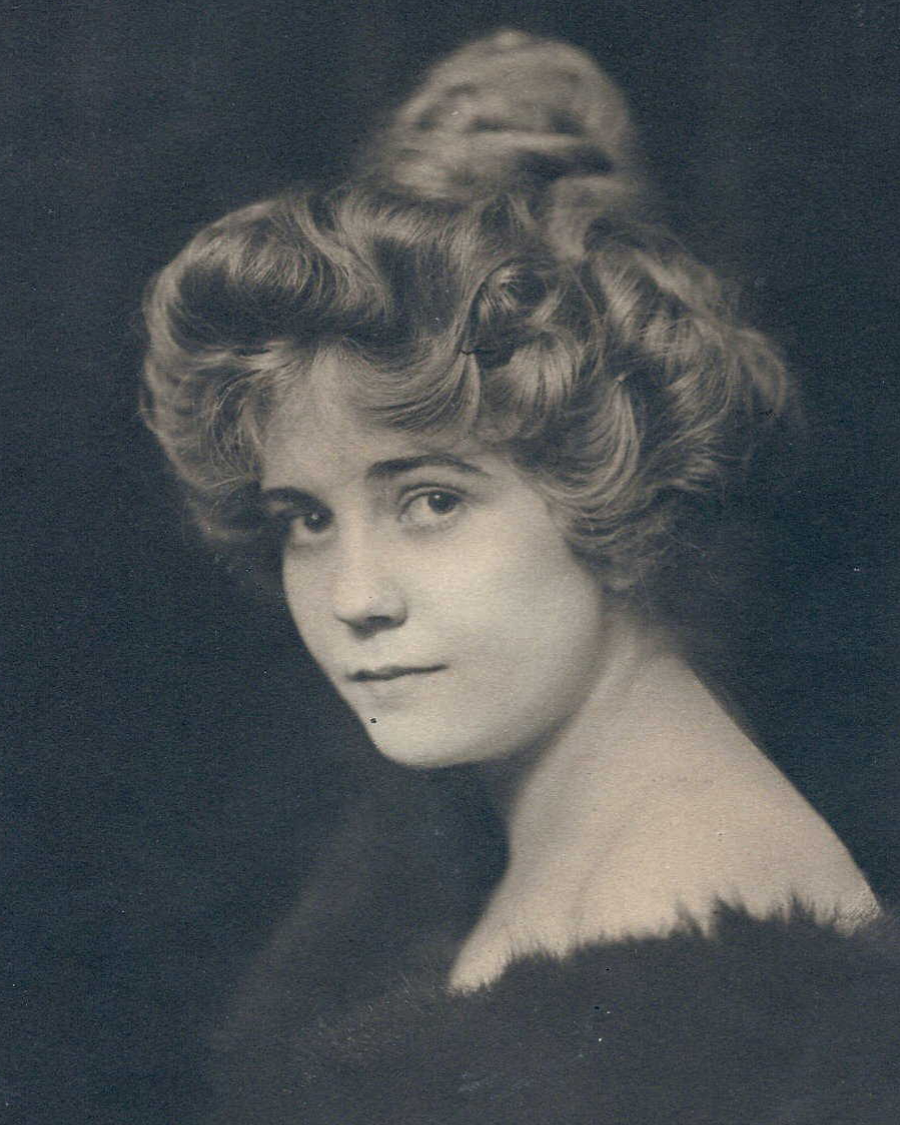
- Ethel Fleming, c1915
- Born: December 27, 1890; Cleveland, Ohio, U.S.
- Died: December 26, 1965 (aged 74); Florida, U.S.
- Occupation: Actress
- Spouse: William Courtleigh Jr. (m. 1915; died 1918)

Ethel Fleming (December 27, 1890 – December 26, 1965) was an American actress and swimmer. She appeared in various films and stage productions during the early 20th century, including in a leading role opposite William Desmond in a stage production of The Pretender.

She was married to actor William Courtleigh Jr. following a three-week courtship until his death in 1918.

== Life ==
Fleming was born in Cleveland, Ohio, and graduated from high school there.

During the summer of 1915, Fleming visited Los Angeles to learn screen art, where she met William Courtleigh Jr. for the first time. At that time, neither had considered settling down with someone, yet proceeded to meet each other on several occasions where "their friendship developed rapidly." After courting for just three weeks and while enjoying a day off their working schedules, the couple passed a registrar's office where Courtleigh made an impromptu suggestion that they get a license of marriage, to which Fleming did not take seriously. Fleming recalled how she was instructed to sign a document by a clerk, noting that "it all happened so quickly." The couple got married on July 25, 1915, in Long Beach, Los Angeles, California and by August 1915 were living in a bungalow, their first home. Courtleigh died of pneumonia in 1918.

In April 1921, Fleming was reported to have drunk carbolic acid, a form of poison, while in the back of a taxi with fellow film actor Joseph King, refusing to answer when questioned her reasons for swallowing the solution. Fleming insisted it was an accident, telling reporters that she did not want to discuss it with anyone. One report suggested that Fleming, who was in a dangerous condition at Bellevue Hospital, drank the fluid in an attempt "to commit suicide because of despondency over lack of employment."

== Career ==
Prior to her acting career, Fleming was a swimmer, described by one newspaper as being known as "the surf girl", due to spending up to four hours a day in the water during the summer months. She had a reputation in her home town of Staten Island as an endurance swimmer, swimming at one time up to 7 miles (11 km) prior to being picked up by boats. She took a great interest in outdoor sports and was described as being "strong and athletic".

Fleming started acting around 1909 as a chorus girl. Her appearance in The Summer Widowers at the Alvin Theater in October 1910 was the first time she left New York City with a theatrical organization. Her parents were apprehensive about her touring with the company until assured that all members were carefully chaperoned. She traveled to Pittsburgh in Pennsylvania, the furthermost city the company would travel.

In 1918, Fleming appeared in the theater production of The Pretender, starring alongside William Desmond as his leading lady. She also starred alongside Desmond in a leading role several years later in the 1923 production of The Fighting Pretender.

Fleming began her film career with Famous Players, while also taking on smaller roles in Fox and Edison productions. His larger roles included The Pretender, The Silent Rider and Smiles.

=== Partial filmography ===
- East Lynne (1916)
- Under Cover (1916)
- The Kiss (1916)
- Love Insurance (1919)
- Smiles (1919)
- The Wonderful Thing (1921)

== Personal ==
Fleming was born to parents Barton Evans Fleming (1827–1897) and Sara A Kennedy (1866–1898) and had an older brother, Clayton Evans Fleming (1887–1952). Growing up in New York City, she was educated in Cleveland, New York.
