= Under Cover (1916 film) =

1916 film by Robert G. Vignola

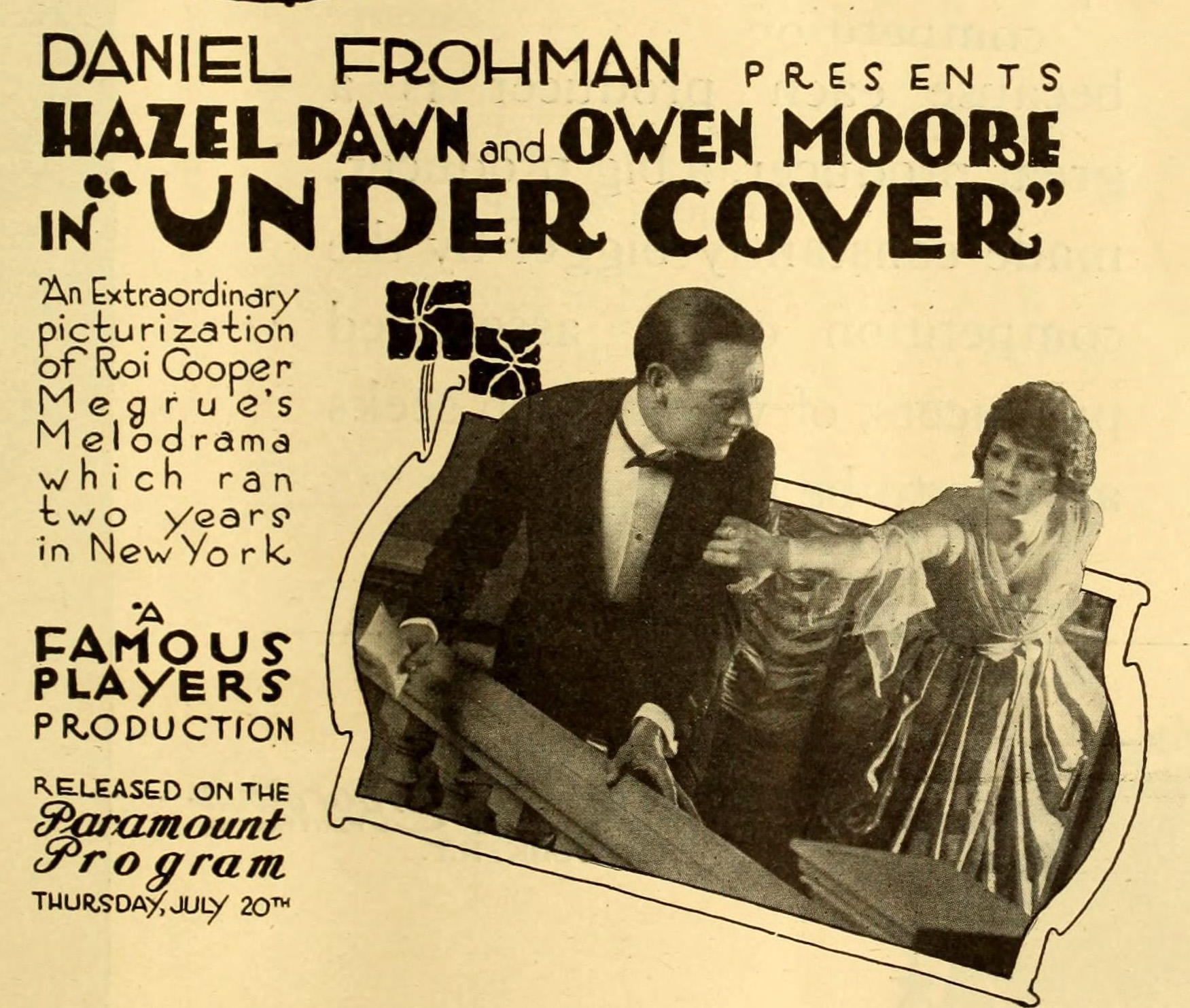
- Ad for film
- Directed by: Robert G. Vignola
- Screenplay by: Doty Hobart; Roi Cooper Megrue
- Starring: Hazel Dawn; Owen Moore; William Courtleigh Jr. Ethel Fleming; Frank Losee; Ida Darling
- Cinematography: William Marshall
- Production company: Famous Players Film Company
- Distributed by: Paramount Pictures
- Release date: July 20, 1916
- Running time: 5 reels
- Country: United States
- Language: Silent (English intertitles)

Under Cover is a lost 1916 American silent drama film directed by Robert G. Vignola, written by Doty Hobart and Roi Cooper Megrue, and starring Hazel Dawn, Owen Moore, William Courtleigh Jr., Ethel Fleming, Frank Losee, and Ida Darling. It was released on July 20, 1916, by Paramount Pictures. It was based on the 1914 Broadway play of the same name.

== Plot ==
Ethel Cartwright, a woman just back from a trip to Paris, is called upon by U.S. government customs inspectors to help determine if a man she met in Paris possesses a valuable necklace. The story ends with a confrontation between the customs officers and the suspect.

== Cast ==
- Hazel Dawn as Ethel Cartwright
- Owen Moore as Steven Denby
- William Courtleigh Jr. as Monty Vaughn
- Ethel Fleming as Amy Cartwright
- Frank Losee as Dan Taylor
- Ida Darling as Mrs. Harrington

== Production ==
Under Cover was partially filmed on location at C. K. G. Billings' Tryon Hall.

== Adaptation ==
A one-hour radio adaptation was presented on Lux Radio Theatre on April 27, 1936, starring Richard Barthelmess and Sally Eilers.
