= Judas (play) =

1929 play by Walter Ferris and Basil Rathbone

Judas is a play in three acts co-authored by Walter Ferris and Basil Rathbone. It premiered on Broadway at the Longacre Theatre on January 24, 1929. It had a short run of only 12 performances. It was staged by Richard Boleslavsky and starred Rathbone as Judas Iscariot. Boleslavsky also designed the costumes; although they were made by the Helene Pons Studio. The show was produced by William A. Brady and Dwight Deere Wiman. Some of the others in the cast included Robert Barrat as Joseph of Arimathea, William Challee as John the Apostle, Charles Halton as Matthew the Apostle and Akiba, William Courtleigh as Simon Iscariot and Caiaphas, Dorothy Cumming as Naomi, and Jennie Eustace as Rebekah among others.

Brooks Atkinson stated in his review in The New York Times, that it was "such a play as actors love and skeptics deplore... For the actor it is an opportunity to cast off the shackles of realistic drama and to revel in attitudinizing and posturing under the protection of a sacred theme."
