= William Courtleigh Jr. =

American actor (1892–1918)

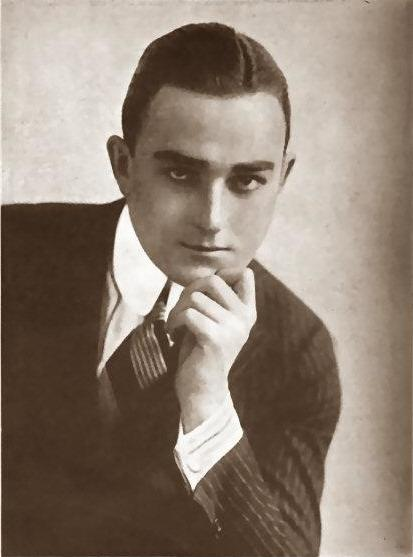
- Photoplay Magazine, 1917
- Born: William Thomas Courtleigh Jr. March 8, 1892; Buffalo, New York, US
- Died: March 13, 1918 (aged 26); Philadelphia, Pennsylvania, US
- Resting place: Woodlawn Cemetery, Bronx, NY
- Occupation: Actor
- Spouse: Ethel Fleming (1915-1918; his death)
- Father: William Courtleigh
- Relatives: Robert Courtleigh (half-brother)

William Thomas Courtleigh Jr. (March 8, 1892 – March 13, 1918) was an American silent film actor who starred in many films during the 1910s and notably died early into his career as a result of the Spanish flu.

== Early years ==
William Thomas Courtleigh Jr. was born in Buffalo, New York was the son of William Courtleigh, a Canadian-born American stage and screen actor. Two of his four half-brothers (Stephen and Robert) also became actors. They had careers on stage and later in television. His half-brothers were the product of his father's second marriage and considerably younger than him.

== Career ==
Like his father, Courtleigh began in stock. His film career began the year before playing Rev. Mark Stebbing in the Vitagraph film The Better Man, based on the novel by Cyrus Townsend Brady. Courtleigh appeared in at least 14 films over his brief career and was probably best remembered for playing Neal Hardin in the 1915 serial Neal of the Navy with Lillian Lorraine. Courtleigh played opposite Ann Pennington in her first two films, Susie Snowflake and The Rainbow Princess, both released in 1916. His last film, Children of Destiny, another Brady story, was released in 1920 by Weber Productions.

== Personal life ==
In July 1915, Courtleigh married actress Ethel Fleming, whom he met when they were working for different companies at a studio in Long Beach, California.

== Death ==
Courtleigh died in Philadelphia on March 13, 1918, an early casualty of the worldwide flu pandemic at age 26.

== Partial filmography ==
- Neal of the Navy (1915)
- Out of the Drifts (1916)
- The Innocent Lie (1916)
- Susie Snowflake (1916)
- The Rainbow Princess (1916)
- The Heart of a Lion (1917)
- By Right of Purchase (1918)
