= The Habit of Happiness =

1916 film by Allan Dwan

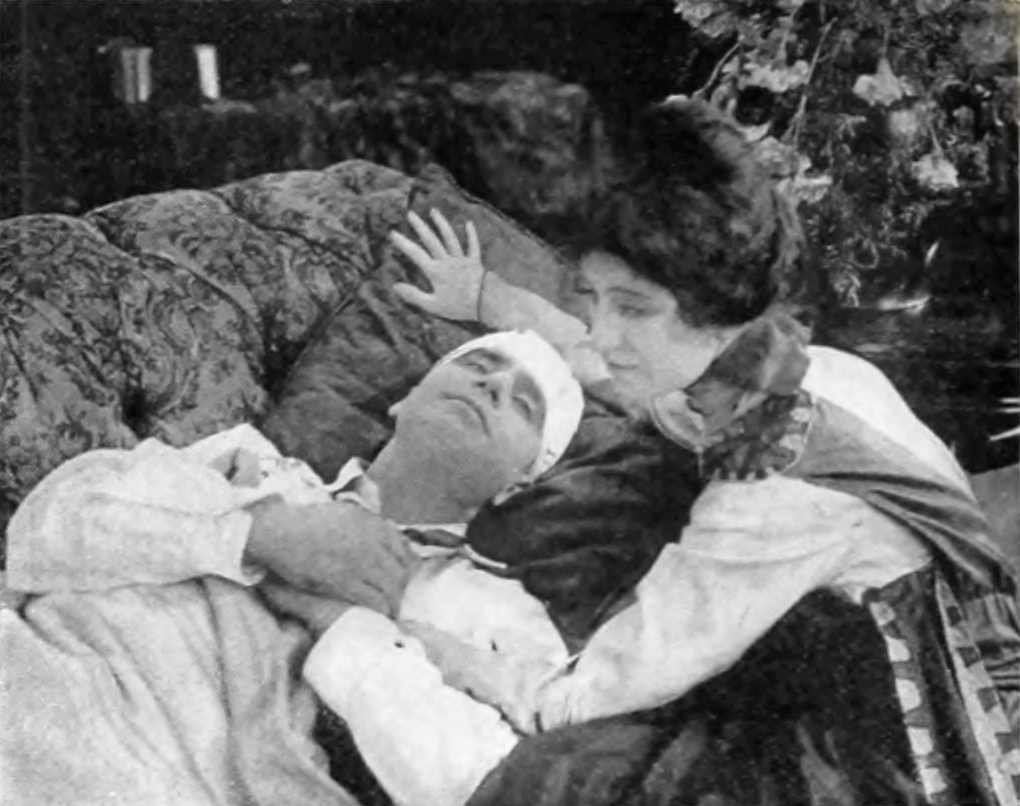
- Film still featured in The Moving Picture World, 1916
- Directed by: Allan Dwan
- Written by: Allan Dwan; Shannon Fife
- Starring: Douglas Fairbanks
- Cinematography: Victor Fleming
- Music by: Hugo Riesenfeld
- Production company: Fine Arts Film Company
- Distributed by: Triangle Distributing
- Release date: March 12, 1916
- Running time: 5 reels
- Country: United States
- Languages: Silent; English intertitles

The Habit of Happiness is a 1916 American silent comedy film directed by Allan Dwan and filmed by cinematographer Victor Fleming. The film was written by Allan Dwan and Shannon Fife from a suggestion by D. W. Griffith and stars Douglas Fairbanks. A 16mm print of the film is preserved in a private collection.

== Cast ==
- Douglas Fairbanks as Sunny Wiggins
- George Fawcett as Jonathan Pepper
- Macey Harlam as Foster
- Dorothy West as Elsie Pepper
- George Backus as Mr. Wiggins
- Grace Rankin as Clarice Wiggins
- William Jefferson as Jones
- Margery Wilson - unconfirmed role
- Adolphe Menjou as Society Man (uncredited)

== Production notes ==
The Habit of Happiness was produced by The Fine Arts Film Company and distributed by Triangle Film Corporation. It was shot at the Riverdale Studios in Fort Lee, New Jersey.

The Habit of Happiness (1916)

== Reception ==
The Moving Picture World, March 25, 1916:

The Habit of Happiness, a Fine Arts production featuring Douglas Fairbanks, is a story with a vital purpose and characterized by some delightful psychology and bright subtitles, but it is thrust upon the audience that the presentation is really a vehicle especially created for the talented star, a common enough fault, but one to be avoided where there Is so much good material as in this release. Interesting revelation of thought and emotion results from the efforts of "Sunny Wiggins," impersonated by Fairbanks, to brighten dull lives. The motive is pretty, and it is adequately handled, the accompanying subtitles fairly sparkling at times. We are following the fortunes of "Sunny Wiggins" In his amusing efforts with a serious purpose, when he starts to tell funny story. On the screen Is now Imprinted a publicity note wholly uncalled for, stating that the story told by Sunny Wiggins loses because Mr. Douglas Fairbanks is not telling It in person. That note should be cut out. From the moment of its appearance artistry takes wing and along with it, any further interest in the affairs of Sunny Wiggins. Either cut it out or add another screen announcement, giving the name and address of the tailor employed by Mr. Fairbanks, but the story is good enough to preserve by the elimination of all that does not pertain to in the telling.

The Postal Record, 1916:

The other night I wandered Into a moving picture show, and the screen play, by the way, was The Habit of Happiness, with Douglas Fairbanks In the leading role. No man can see that remarkable picture and remain a grouch. It Is better than all the pills and medicine and good advice in the world. If you want a real laugh that should last a lifetime see this screen play. Letter carriers, like other men, need a tonic at times. Try this one.

Woman's Home Companion, June, 1916:

A funny picture in which the hero, Sunny Wiggins, a good-natured boy with no business ability, succeeds because of his good humor. The role is admirably adapted to Douglas Fairbanks's cheerful personality.
