= The Reckless Age =

1924 film by Harry A. Pollard

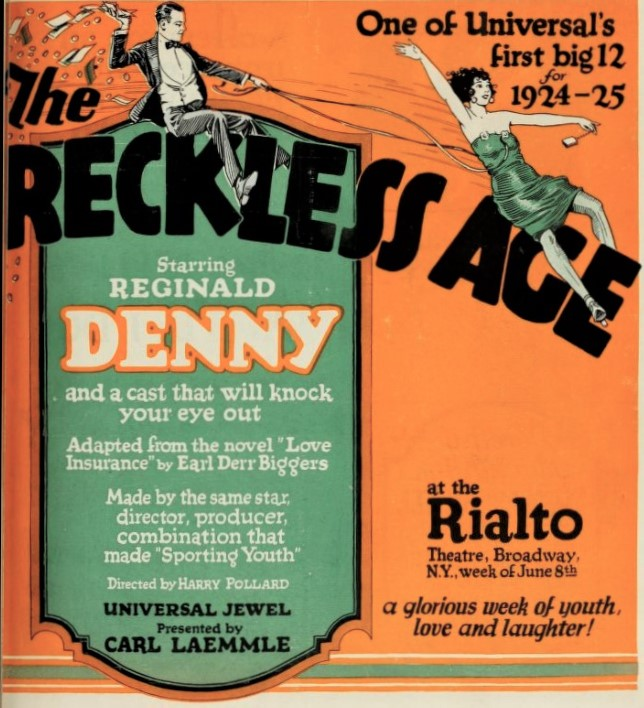
- Advertisement
- Directed by: Harry A. Pollard
- Written by: Rex Taylor
- Based on: Love Insurance by Earl Derr Biggers
- Produced by: Carl Laemmle
- Cinematography: William Fildew
- Distributed by: Universal Pictures
- Release date: August 17, 1924
- Running time: 7 reels
- Country: United States
- Language: Silent (English intertitles)

The Reckless Age (1924) by Harry A. Pollard

The Reckless Age is a 1924 American silent comedy-drama film directed by Harry A. Pollard and starring Reginald Denny. It was produced and distributed by Universal Pictures. It is based on the novel Love Insurance by Earl Derr Biggers and is a remake of an earlier Paramount film Love Insurance (1919), which is now lost.

== Plot ==
As described in a film magazine, Dick Minot, crack "trouble-shooter" of Lloyd's International Insurance Company, is assigned to guard Lord Harrowby from disaster in connection with his coming marriage to Cynthia Meyrick, an heiress, as the nobleman having taken out an insurance policy against his failure to marry her. Minot proceeds to the Florida resort where Cynthia is and where the marriage is to take place. On the way he meets the heiress, who is beautiful. He promptly falls in love with her, but his duty stares him in the face. He must leave no stone unturned to see that her romance with the nobleman does not fall through. She, in the meantime, has fallen in love with the insurance man. Trouble develops when a man, claiming to be the real Lord Harrowby appears, and Minot promptly has him kidnaped and put aboard a yacht. Then a London chorus girl appears and threatens to sue His Lordship for breach of promise, which of course would wreck the romance. Minot discovers that chorus girl is already married and gets rid of her. In the meantime, the heiress practically proposes to Minot, and his duty stands between them until — but that's telling! It's a big surprise — and a big laugh!

== Cast ==
- Reginald Denny as Dick Minot
- Ruth Dwyer as Cynthia Meyrick
- John Steppling as Spencer Meyrick
- May Wallace as Auntie Meyrick
- William Austin as Lord Harrowby
- Tom McGuire as Martin Wall
- Fred Malatesta as Manuel Gonzales
- Henry A. Barrows as John Thacker
- Frederick Vroom as Owen Johnson
- William E. Lawrence as John Paddock
- Hayden Stevenson as Henry Trimmer
- Frank Leigh as George Jenkins
- Fay Tincher as The Duchess of Lismore

== Preservation ==
A copy of The Reckless Age is preserved at EYE Film Institute Netherlands in Amsterdam.

== Home media ==
The Reckless Age was restored and remastered in 4K and released on 1080p Blu-ray disc in 2020 by Kino Lorber as part of the boxed set The Reginald Denny Collection.
