= List of Marathi films of 1971 =

A list of films produced by the Marathi language film industry based in Maharashtra in 1971.

== 1971 releases ==
A list of Marathi films released in 1971.

| Film | Director | Cast | Notes | Source |
|---|---|---|---|---|
| Aai Udhe ga Ambabai | Anant Govind Mane | | | |
| Shantata! Court Chalu Aahe | Satyadev Dubey | Arvind Deshpande, Sulbha Deshpande, Amrish Puri, Amol Palekar, Eknath Hattagadi | National Film Award for Best Feature Film in Marathi in 1971 .It marked the debut of actors Amrish Puri and Amol Palekar, and of Govind Nihalani for whom this was his first film as a full-fledged cinematographer. | |
| Daam Kari Kaam | Prabhakar Naik | | | |
| Adhikar | Arun Vasudev Karnatki, Dinkar Patil | Shammi | | |
| Donhi Gharcha Pahuna | Gajanan Jagirdar | Ashok Saraf | | |
| Kunkwacha Karanda | Datta Mane | | | |
| Kasa Kai Patil Bara Hai Ka | Datta Mane | Jayshree Gadkar | | |
| Asel Mazha Hari | Dutta Keshav Kulkarni | | | |
| Nate Jadle Don Jiwaache | Gurubaal | Anupama, Dada Salvi, Dulari | | |
| Jhep | Rajdutt | | | |
| Bajiraocha Beta | Raja Thakur | Mandakani Bhadbhade, Amol Palekar, Surekha | | |
| Tithe Nandati Laxmi | Bal Korde | Naren Chavan, Kusum Deshpande, Chandrakant Gokhale | | |
| Asheech Ek Ratra | Anant Mane | | | |
| Songadya | Govind Kulkarni | Dada Kondke, Usha Chavan, Nilu Phule | | |
