= Kettikaran =

- DVD cover
- Directed by: H. S. Venu
- Starring: Jaishankar; Leela; Major Sundarrajan; Nagesh
- Music by: Shankar–Ganesh
- Production company: Dhandayuthapani Films
- Release date: 19 November 1971
- Running time: 122 minutes
- Country: India
- Language: Tamil

Kettikaran (transl. Clever man) is a 1971 Indian Tamil-language action spy film directed by H. S. Venu. The film stars Jaishankar, Leela, Nagesh and Major Sundarrajan. It was released on 19 November 1971.

== Cast ==
- Jaishankar in Double Role as CID Raju / Babu
- Leela as Gowri
- Nagesh as Dance Master Jayapal
- Major Sundarrajan as Sangu
- S. A. Ashokan (guest role) as Boss
- Jayakumari
- Kallapart Natarajan as hotel clerk
- Sachu (guest role)
- P. R. Varalakshmi as Sivagami
- Prabhakar as Fight Master
- Nalini
- Vijayarekha
- Pushpa
- Ranchana

== Soundtrack ==
The music was composed by Shankar–Ganesh.

Track listing
No.	Title	Singer(s)	Length
1.	"Parthen Parkatha Azhgai"	T. M. Soundararajan, P. Susheela	3:26
2.	"Naanamenbathu Enna Enna"	L. R. Eswari	3:31
3.	"Then Sotta Sotta Sirikkum"	T. M. Soundararajan, P. Susheela	3:32
4.	"Vaa Vaa Idhu Oru Ragasiyam"	L. R. Eswari	3:53
Total length:			14:22

== Release ==
Kettikaran was released on 19 November 1971. According to Free India, it created a record by being the first Tamil film to release in six theatres in Madras.
