= Tanned Legs =

1929 film directed by Marshall Neilan

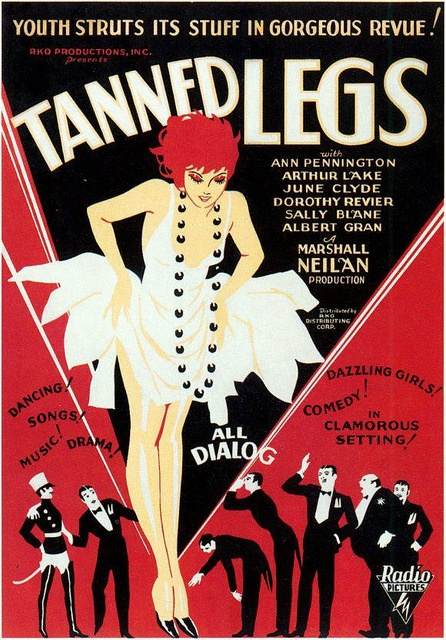
- Film Poster for Tanned Legs
- Directed by: Marshall Neilan
- Screenplay by: Thomas J. Geraghty
- Story by: Louis Sarecky
- Produced by: Louis Sarecky
- Starring: Ann Pennington; Arthur Lake; June Clyde; Dorothy Revier; Sally Blane; Albert Gran
- Cinematography: Leo Tover
- Edited by: Archie Marshek
- Music by: Oscar Levant; Sidney Clare
- Distributed by: Radio Pictures – later RKO Pictures
- Release date: November 10, 1929 (US)
- Running time: 71 minutes (66 minutes-TCM print)
- Country: United States
- Language: English

Tanned Legs is a 1929 American Pre-Code musical comedy directed by Marshall Neilan and written by Thomas J. Geraghty based on a story by Louis Sarecky. The film starred Ann Pennington, Arthur Lake, June Clyde, Dorothy Revier, Sally Blane and Albert Gran. In its first year of operations, RKO attempted to take advantage of musicals as much as possible, and so the music of Oscar Levant and Sidney Clare was awkwardly inserted into this simple comedy script.

== Plot ==
Peggy is the daughter of Mr. Reynolds and his wife Sophie. Although married, both of the elder Reynolds are having romantic interludes with younger people, Mrs. Lyons-King and Roger Fleming, respectively. In addition, Peggy's sister, Janet, is infatuated with Clinton Darrow, a ne'er-do-well, who is only interested in the Reynolds' money, not in Janet. Peggy is in the only normal relationship, with her boyfriend, Bill.

While at a seaside resort, Peggy attempts to get all of her family members back in line. However, things become convoluted as Mr. Reynolds is about to buy some useless shares of stock, having been convinced by Lyons-King, as Darrow begins to blackmail Janet due to some rather juicy letters she had sent to him. When Janet sneaks into Darrow's room, attempting to retrieve her letters, she is seen by her sister and Bill, who think she is sneaking in for other reasons. Janet is unsuccessful in her attempt to procure the incriminating letters.

As Darrow steps up his blackmail threats, Janet can see no way out, so decides to kill him instead. However, during the attempted assassination, she mistakenly wounds Peggy, rather than her intended target. Bill, meanwhile has become fed up with all of the antics going on and is sundered from Peggy.

Through a twisted process during a fake robbery, a friend of Peggy's, Roger Fleming, and his girlfriend, Tootie, obtain the letters from Darrow, thus ending the blackmail attempt. Peggy manages to straighten out both of her parents, and by the end of the film is reconciled with Bill.

== Cast ==
- Arthur Lake as Bill
- June Clyde as Peggy Reynolds
- Dorothy Revier as Mrs. Lyons-King
- Ann Pennington as Tootie
- Albert Gran as Mr. Reynolds
- Allen Kearns as Roger Fleming
- Sally Blane as Janet Reynolds
- Edmund Burns as Clinton Darrow
- Lincoln Stedman as Pudgy
- Nella Walker as Mrs. Sophie Reynolds
- Claire Rochelle as Dancer

== Songs ==
- "With You, With Me" – Oscar Levant and Sidney Clare – Sung by June Clyde and Arthur Lake. Reprised by Allen Kearns.
- "Come in the Water, the Water Is Fine" – Oscar Levant and Sidney Clare – Sung by June Clyde.
- "You're Responsible" – Oscar Levant and Sidney Clare – Sung by Ann Pennington and Allen Kearns.
- "Tanned Legs" – Oscar Levant and Sidney Clare – Sung by Ann Pennington. Reprised by June Clyde.

== See also ==
- List of early sound feature films (1926–1929)
