= Susie Snowflake =

1916 film by James Kirkwood

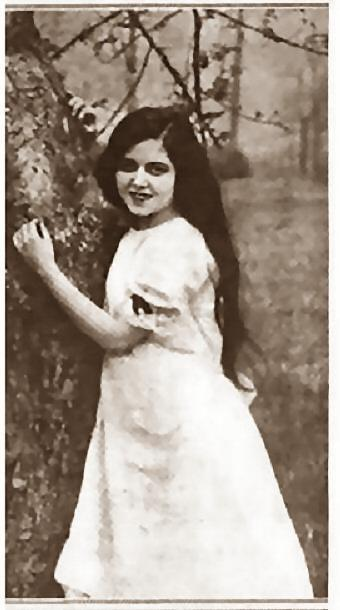
- Ann Pennington as Susie Snowflake; Photoplay Magazine, 1916.
- Directed by: James Kirkwood
- Written by: Shannon Fife (Story, Scenario)
- Produced by: Paramount Pictures
- Starring: Ann Pennington
- Cinematography: Ned Van Buren
- Distributed by: Famous Players Film Company
- Release date: June 25, 1916
- Running time: 50 minutes
- Country: USA
- Language: Silent..English titlecards

Susie Snowflake is a lost American silent film released by Paramount Pictures on June 25, 1916. The picture was directed by James Kirkwood Sr. and filmed by cinematographer Ned Van Buren. Susie Snowflake was written and adapted for the screen by Shannon Fife and introduced actress Ann Pennington to American filmgoers.

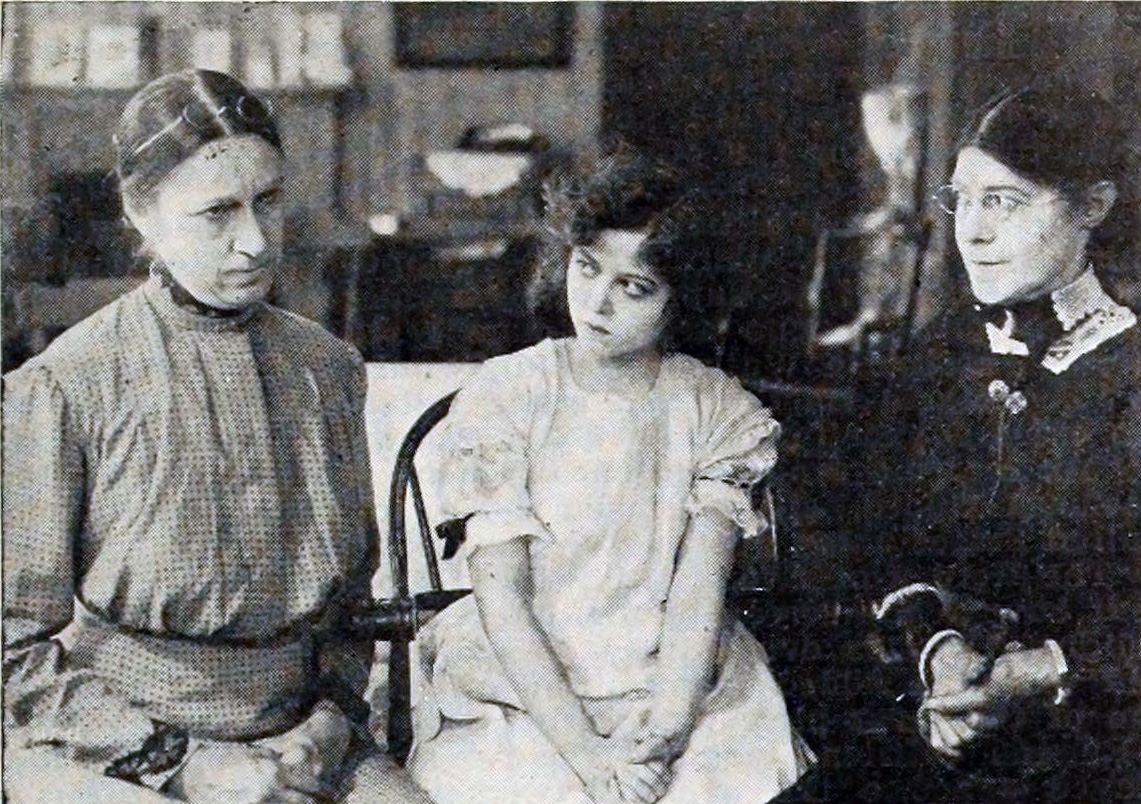
Susie Snowflake (1916)

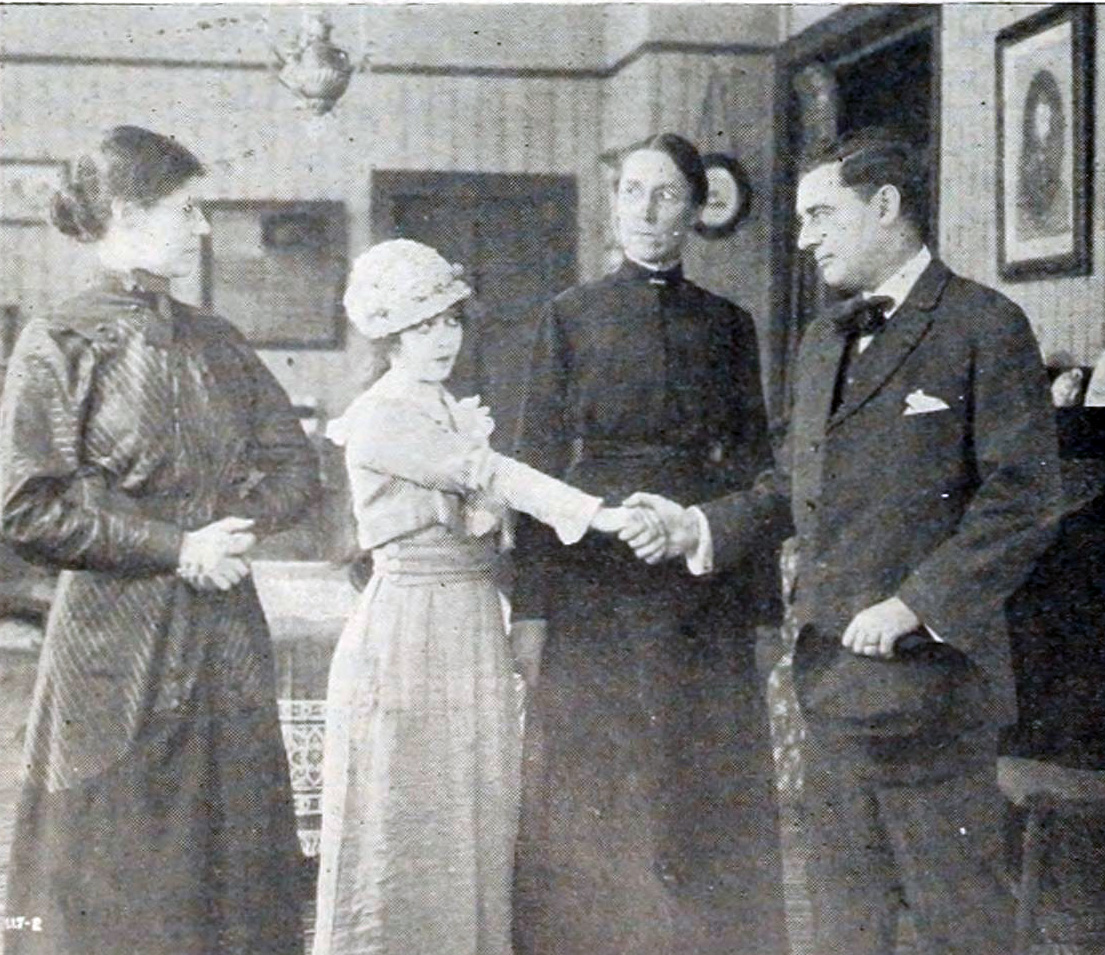
Susie Snowflake (1916)

== Reception ==
The Moving Picture World, 1916

Susie Snowflake at the Broadway.

Ann Pennington, the celebrated little Ziegfeld Follies star, made her motion picture debut in the Famous Players production, Susie Snowflake, at the Broadway theater. There is something irresistibly appealing about "Susie," and Miss Pennington has caught the charm of the little dancer who scandalizes her maiden aunts and sets a whole town agog when she brings her Broadway ideals into the community. But there is a lot of real character and unswerving loyality in "Susie," as she proves when she is put to the test. The usual weekly news, colored scenics, educational studies, short comedies and cartoons round out the bill.

Ladies Home Companion, 1916

Susie Snowflake, Famous Players Paramount, 5 reels: When Ann Pennington, as little Susie the dancer, brought up on the stage, arrives in a small town to live with her spinster aunts, something is bound to happen. It does happen in an amusing way.

Forest Leaves, 1916

Monday and Tuesday the diminutive star of musical comedy, Ann Pennington, makes her debut before the camera in the Paramount masterpiece "Susie Snowflake." When Miss Pennington appeared in "The Red Widow" the success was instantaneous and her popularity has gained constantly since. The story of "Susie Snowflake" alternates between Broadway, New York, with its hilarity and gay night life, and the quiet and peaceful surroundings of the "little old home town." The piece is full of excitement, dramatic passages, romance and humor.

Photoplay Magazine, 1916

Ann Pennington, in "Susie Snowflake." Here is a bright little star so far without an appropriate picture play. "Susie" was dreadful.

== Cast ==
- Ann Pennington ... Susie
- Leo Delaney ... David
- William Courtleigh, Jr. ... Roy
- William J. Butler ... Amos
- Marcia Harris ... Martha
- Billie Wilson ... Phoebe

Source IMDb.com
