= Kallapart Natarajan =

Indian actor (1926–1996)

- Born: Natarajan; 1926; Thanjavur, Tamil Nadu
- Died: 27 March 1996 (aged 69–70)
- Occupations: Film actor, dancer
- Years active: 1952-1996
- Parent(s): Ramalingam; Paripooranathammal

Kallapart Natarajan (1926-1996) was an Indian actor who works in Tamil-language films. He received the moniker 'Kallapart' from his role as a thief (Kallapart) in stage dramas.

== Selected filmography ==
- Marumagal (1953)
- Nalla Idathu Sammandham (1958)
- Kaithi Kannayiram (1960)
- Deivapiravi (1960)
- Naagamalai Azhagi (1962)
- Sengamala Theevu (1962)
- Madras to Pondicherry (1966)
- Kan Kanda Deivam (1967)
- Kallum Kaniyagum (1968)
- Oli Vilakku (1968)
- Neelagiri Express (1968)
- Kasturi Thilakam (1970)
- Kankaatchi (1971)
- Kettikaran (1971)
- Sange Muzhangu (1972)
- Thevar Magan (1992)

== Awards ==
- Kalaimamani by Tamil Nadu Government
