= William Courtleigh =

Canadian-American actor (1869–1930)

William Courtleigh Sr.
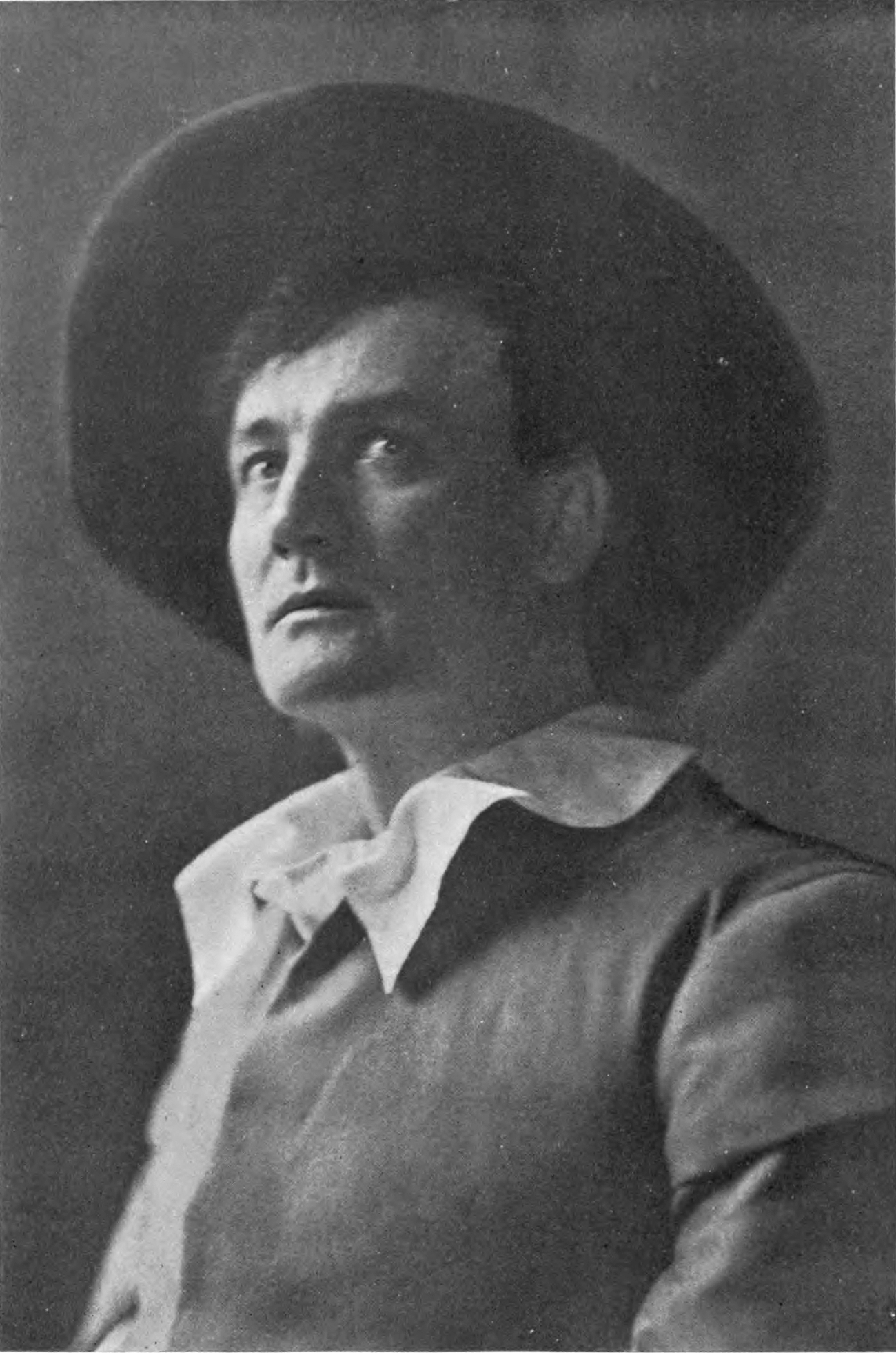
- William Courtleigh in Lorna Doone.

Shepherd of The Lambs
- In office 1913–1917
- Preceded by: Joseph R. Grismer
- Succeeded by: R. H. Burnside

Personal details
- Born: William Louis Courtleigh; June 28, 1867 Guelph, Ontario, Canada
- Died: December 27, 1930 (aged 63) Rye, New York
- Resting place: Woodlawn Cemetery, Bronx, NY
- Spouse(s): Helen Cross (1890), Edna Conroy (1912)
- Children: William Courtleigh Jr., Stephen Courtleigh, Robert Courtleigh
- Occupation: Actor * Manager
- Known for: Co-Founder Actors Equity

William Louis Courtleigh (28 June 1867 – 27 December 1930) was a Canadian-American stage and film actor who appeared in Broadway productions, vaudeville theatre, and silent films.

Courtleigh was born June 28, 1867, in Guelph, Ontario, Canada to Stephen and Elizabeth (Phelan) Flynn. At the age of three his family moved to St. Louis, Missouri, where he was raised and educated. While studying law at Washington University he became a member of the St. Louis-based McCullough Club, an amateur dramatic organization, and attracted attention as an amateur actor. He made his first appearance on the stage in 1889, in Brother and Sister, under the management of John Dillon. After a season with Dillon's company, he joined the company of Fanny Davenport and played the roles of Jean de Sereux in Fedora, and Thyseno in Cleopatra. He had an important part in La Tosca, and it was in Davenport's company that he first appeared on Broadway, New York.

His next engagement was with Augustin Daly's stock company, appearing with that organization in The Taming of the Shrew and The Foresters with Ada Rehan. He succeeded Robert Hilliard as the hero of Blue Jeans, played the leading role in In Old Kentucky, and was leading man for Helen Dauvray in "That Sister of His" in succession, and then played in the principal role in The District Attorney.

With the company of Margaret Mather and E.J. Henley he played Posthumus in Cymbeline, Romeo to Mather's Juliet, Rudolph in Leah, and Orlando in As You Like It. After appearing in the title role in The Man of Honor, he was engaged by Daniel Frohman for the Lyceum Theatre Stock Company. He first appeared at the Lyceum in The Princess and the Butterfly, and when James K. Hackett became ill Courtleigh took his place in the leading role. In the summers of 1904 and 1905 he headed New England stock companies (Providence, Rhode Island and Boston, Massachusetts). In 1906, after being featured in the unsuccessful The Redemption of David Corson and playing Charles Hawtrey's role in The Lucky Miss Dean, he went into vaudeville with R. C. MacCulloch's one-act play, The Third Degree, in which Courtleigh played eight different roles. In the season of 1907-1908 he played Peaches, by George V. Hobart, in vaudeville.

Courtleigh married stage actress Helen Cross on March 17, 1890, and they had a son, William Courtleigh Jr., who also became an actor. Cross died in 1908, and on May 12, 1912, Courtleigh married Edna Lillian Conroy (June 28, 1885 – July 25, 1962), an actress. They had four sons together, of whom two, Stephen and Robert, became actors as well. Courtleigh was a member of The Lambs and served as Shepherd (president) from 1913 to 1917, succeeding Joseph R. Grismer. He is credited with naming the Actors' Equity Association. He portrayed Simon Iscariot and Caiaphas in Basil Rathbone's Judas at the Longacre Theatre in 1929.

Courtleigh died at his home in Rye, New York, on December 27, 1930, after suffering from acute indigestion.

== Filmography ==
- The Nightingale (1914)
- The Birth of Character (1916)
- Eyes of Youth (1919)
- Pollyanna (1920)
- Moon Madness (1920)
- Madame X (1920)
- Handle with Care (1922)
- Any Night (1922)
- Midnight (1922)
- Ashes (1922)
