= Robert Courtleigh =

American actor

Robert Courtleigh (October 23, 1916 – November 21, 2004) was an American television and film actor.

== Biography ==
He was born in Rye, New York, one of four sons born to Edna (Conroy) Courtleigh, a Gibson Girl, and William Courtleigh, a Canadian-born acclaimed Broadway actor, member of the Lamb's Club, and co-creator of the Actors' Equity Association.

Courtleigh got his start in the 1950s science fiction television series Atom Squad playing character Steve Elliott alongside Bob Hastings and Bram Nossem. This role led to Courtleigh being chosen as an honorary delegate to the ninth annual World Science Fiction Convention held in Philadelphia, Pennsylvania. Among Courtleigh's other television roles were an episode of Men into Space in the 1960s, the part of the evil stepmother's groom in Rodgers and Hammerstein's Cinderella, a CBS TV special starring Lesley Ann Warren; several appearances in Hallmark Hall of Fame productions; and supporting roles in the Sylvester Stallone drama F.I.S.T. and Winter Kills, a John Huston thriller.

On March 15, 2022 it was confirmed on the MASH matters pod cast that Courtleigh played the role of General Douglas McArthur in the M*A*S*H episode 'Big Mac'

Courtleigh was preceded in death by his wife, Gretchen (who died in February 2004); they each had a child from previous marriages. Courtleigh's brother, Stephen, and half-brother, William, were also actors.

== Film and television ==
Year	Title	Role	Notes
1953	Hallmark Hall of Fame: "Dinner for the General	George	TV movie
1953	Atom Squad	Steve Elliott	TV movie
1959	Special Agent 7	Bell	Episode: "The Lady From Louisville"
1960	Men into Space	Captain Jerry MacIntyre	Episode: "Lunar Secret"
1965	Rodgers and Hammerstein's Cinderella	Stepmother's Groom	TV movie
1975	M*A*S*H	General Douglas MacArthur	Episode: "Big Mac" (uncredited)
1977	Hallmark Hall of Fame: Have I Got a Christmas for You	George	TV movie
1978	F.I.S.T.	Congressman	
1979	Winter Kills	First Mate of T.K.	(final film role)
