= Ann Pennington (actress) =

American actress, dancer, and singer (1893–1971)

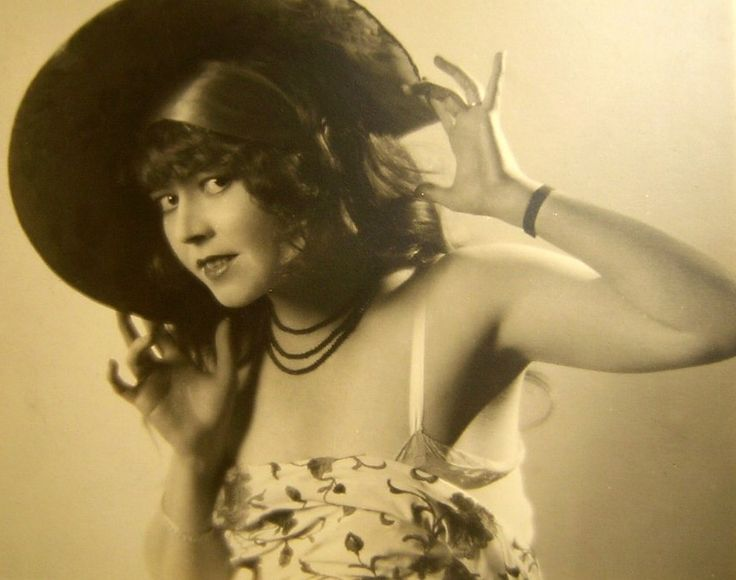
- Pennington c. 1926
- Born: Anna Rebecca Pennington; December 23, 1893; Wilmington, Delaware, U.S.
- Died: November 4, 1971 (aged 77); New York City, U.S.
- Resting place: Kensico Cemetery, Westchester County, New York
- Other names: Penny; Tiny
- Occupation: Actress
- Years active: 1911–1943
- Height: 4 ft 10 in (147 cm)

Anna Rebecca Pennington (December 23, 1893 – November 4, 1971) was an American actress, dancer, and singer who starred on Broadway in the 1910s and 1920s, notably in the Ziegfeld Follies and George White's Scandals.

== Early life ==
Pennington was born in Wilmington, Delaware, on December 23, 1893, to John I. Pennington and his wife, Mary (Reeder) Pennington.

== Early career ==
There are differing accounts of Pennington's early career. She reportedly studied at Professor Walter G. Wroe's dance school in Philadelphia and performed in popular theaters as part of Wroe's Buds. She later studied with Caroline Littlefield and her daughter, future ballerina Catherine Littlefield, and became part of the Littlefield's dance group. It is said she was dancing with this group when Florenz Ziegfeld, Jr. recruited her for a Broadway show in 1911.

In 1910, Pennington reportedly performed as part of the De Haven Sextet (composed of "the celebrated comedian Sydney Gibson and six young and pretty girls") at a Camden, New Jersey, theater. The De Haven Sextet (with Pennington) performed in Newark at Proctor's Park Place Theatre in February 1911; the group was on a national tour during 1910-1911. Pennington's first press mention in connection with The Red Widow was in 1912. Her first press mention associated with Ziegfeld was on May 31, 1913, announcing her casting in Ziegfeld Follies of 1913.

== Broadway stardom ==
Pennington achieved stardom in the Ziegfeld Follies of 1913 through her dancing, as well as her beauty, lively charm, and "dimpled knees". She tapped, did high kicks, and shook while doing classic tap and novelty dances.

She first introduced the Black Bottom in the 1926 edition of George White's Scandals. Her performance launched an international craze that quickly rivaled that of the Charleston. There is no consensus about the dance's origins, but some version of it existed before Pennington made it famous.

Pennington starred in the Ziegfeld Follies for many years and also headlined for George White's Scandals for several years. She had other roles on Broadway, including Miss 1917, The New Yorkers, and Everybody's Welcome. Her last Broadway credit was The Student Prince in 1943.

In summing up her career, one critic declared that "Pennington was the greatest of the solo female stage dancers who came to prominence in the Broadway revues of the 1910s and '20s."

== Motion pictures ==
Pennington appeared in over twenty films, from Susie Snowflake in 1916 to China Girl in 1942. While Pennington was already famous for her Broadway performances, Susie Snowflake succeeded in introducing her to a nationwide audience. Shannon Fife wrote the film to showcase her dancing and acting talents. The film received mostly positive reviews.

== Singing ==
Pennington often added songs to her dance routines. One of the highlights of the Ziegfeld Follies of 1914 was her song and dance routine Tango-Palace. In her first talking film, Tanned Legs, she sang and danced You're Responsible with Allen Kearns. In the 1929 film "Gold Diggers of Broadway", Pennington could be heard singing the "Song of the Gold Diggers" on Jerry’s countertop in her apartment, although only as a transition to another scene. In the 1929 film "Is Everybody Happy?", Pennington sang the solo "Samoa" along with playing a ukulele and doing a tap dancing routine. In the 1930 Vitaphone short "Hello, Baby!", she sang "Believe Me" as well as "I Gotta Have You", "Huddlin'" and "H'lo Baby" as duets with Norman Shelby.

== Personal life ==
While Pennington had several romances, she never married.

== Later years ==
Pennington kept performing later in life. At the age of 42, she appeared in George Jessel's Old New York show for the 1939 World's Fair,

But as years passed, her age became increasingly an issue. In 1946, she told a reporter that she was still dancing at age 53. He wrote, "Imagine Ann Pennington being 53! Oh, time, why do you march on the way you do? You're breaking my heart!"

In her final years, Pennington lived in poverty in New York City. She frequently visited local race tracks and spent any money she could acquire through loans or infrequent club performances. She became a familiar but unfortunate presence in the lobby of the Times Square Hotel and at the Horn & Hardart automat, often seen sitting alone with a cup of coffee.

== Death ==
Pennington died in New York City on November 4, 1971, aged 77. She was buried in the Actors’ Fund plot at Kensico Cemetery, Westchester County, New York. Her funeral was paid for by the Actors Benevolent Guild.

== Filmography ==
=== Silent ===
- Susie Snowflake (1916)
- The Rainbow Princess (1916)
- The Antics of Ann (1917)
- The Little Boy Scout(1917)
- Sunshine Nan (1918)
- Manhandled (1924)
- The Golden Strain (1925)
- The Lucky Horseshoe (1925)
- Madame Behave (1925)
- A Kiss in the Dark (1925)
- The Mad Dancer (1925)
- Pretty Ladies (1925)

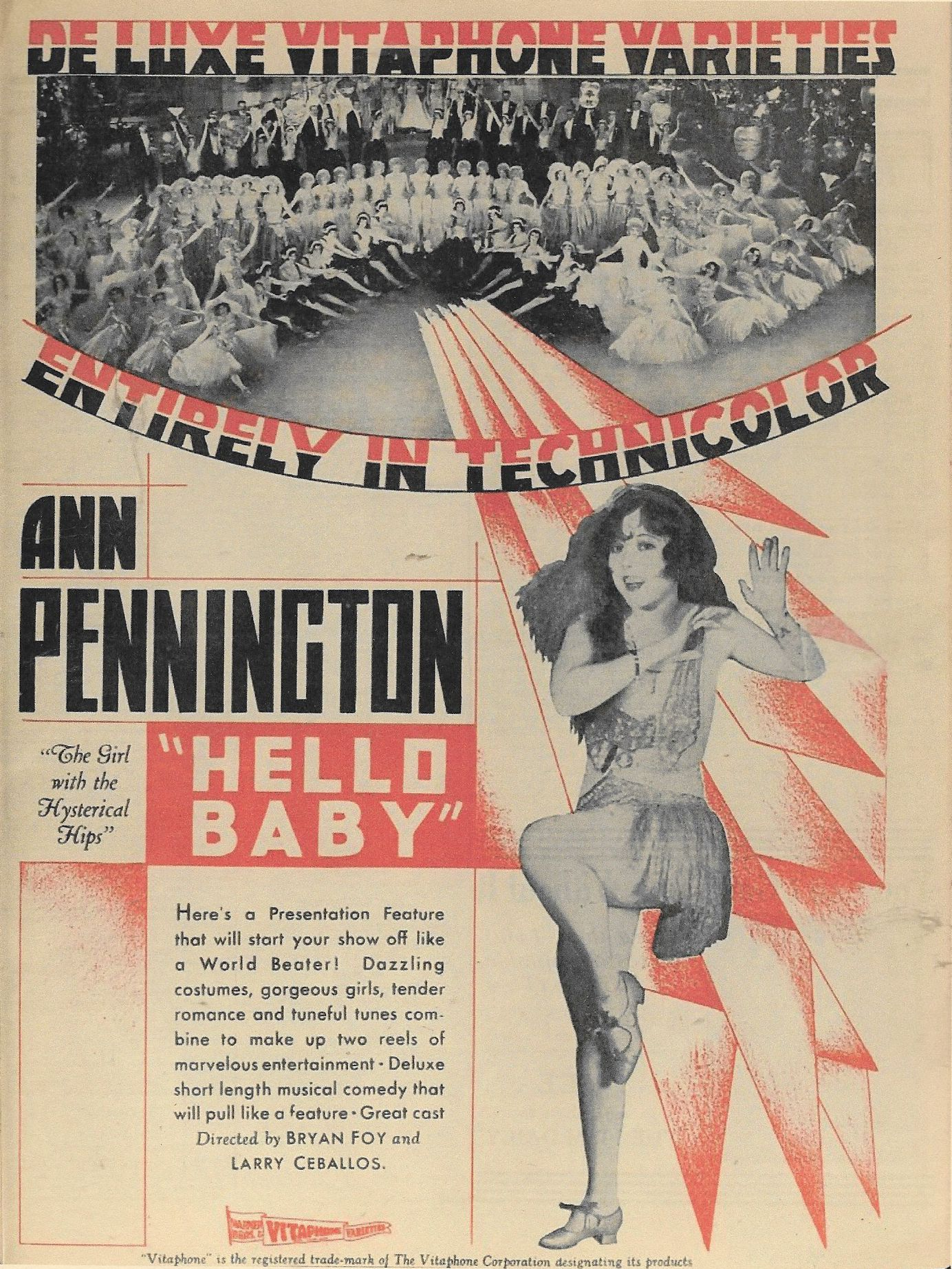

=== Sound ===
- Tanned Legs (1929)
- Night Parade (1929)
- Is Everybody Happy? (1929)
- Gold Diggers of Broadway (1929)
- Night Club (1929)
- Hello, Baby! (1930)
- Happy Days (1930)
- Texas Terrors (1940)
- Unholy Partners (1941)
- China Girl (1942)
