= Pudhiya Sagaptham =

- VCD cover
- Directed by: Visu
- Written by: Visu
- Produced by: K. Gopinathan
- Starring: Vijayakanth; Ambika; Visu
- Cinematography: R. Ganesh
- Edited by: N. R. Kittu
- Music by: Gangai Amaran
- Production company: Sri Bagavathi Creations
- Release date: 25 May 1985
- Running time: 130 minutes
- Country: India
- Language: Tamil

Pudhiya Sagaptham (transl. New Era) is a 1985 Indian Tamil-language drama film written and directed by Visu. The film stars Vijayakanth, Ambika and Visu. It was released on 25 May 1985, and failed commercially.

== Plot ==
Uma finds a job in a college library after she impressed Vijay, a college student, who becomes the school leader. Uma's father kills her stepmother and commits suicide, leaving her and his three children alone. Ramadasaradan joins the college for a mysterious reason which only Uma knows. Ramadasaradan links secretly Vijay and Uma by writing the wrong relationship between them, so Uma is fired. When Vijay goes to her house, he sees a photo of Uma with her husband. The college watchman tells Vijay the truth and Vijay asks Ramadasaradan why he did it. Visu tells him that her husband is dead and he was her father-in-law. His son Deepak, a heart patient married Uma and died on his wedding night. When Uma became a widow she quit his house, as Ramadasaradan urged her to find a husband. Ramadasaradan and Vijay try to persuade her to marry Vijay, which she finally agrees to.

== Cast ==
- Vijayakanth as Vijay
- Ambika as Uma
- Visu as Ramadhasarathan
- Karthik as Deepak (guest appearance)
- Vinodhini as Shanthi
- Kishmu as Achuthan Nair
- Sivachandran as Manager Chandran
- T. P. Gajendran as Gajendran

== Production ==
The film was launched on 9 July 1984. Some scenes were picturised at Rajaji Hall at Chennai.

== Soundtrack ==
The music was composed by Gangai Amaran, with lyrics written by himself, Pulamaipithan, Na. Kamarasan and Idhayachandra.

Song	Singer(s)	Duration
"Puyal Veesiyadho"	S. N. Surendar	3:50
"Intha Iravu"	S. P. Balasubrahmanyam, S. Janaki	3:57
"Kalloori Nirvagam"	S. P. Balasubrahmanyam	3:33
"Kalyana Ponnu"	Malaysia Vasudevan, Chorus	4:07
