= Bindu Ghosh =

Indian actress (1948/1949–2025)

- Born: Vimala; 1948 or 1949
- Died: 16 March 2025 (aged 76)
- Occupations: Actress; choreographer
- Years active: 1960–1991
- Children: 2

Bindu Ghosh (1948 or 1949 – 16 March 2025) was an Indian film and stage actress and choreographer who performed in predominantly Tamil-language films. Her debut film was Kalathur Kannamma released in 1960.

== Career ==
=== As choreographer ===
Kalathur Kannamma is her first film. In that film, she performed a group dance in animal getup along with Kamal Haasan. She danced to the group song "Ellorum Nalam Vaazha" in Enga Mama (1970). She was featured in Group Dance in all Thangappan Master's later films.

=== As actress ===
Initially, she acted in dramas before acting in comedies.

== Personal life and death ==
Ghosh was diagnosed with various health conditions which made it difficult for her to continue her acting career. She lived with her two sons who are also choreographers in Tamil cinema and Telugu cinema. She died on 16 March 2025, at the age of 76.

== Filmography ==
=== Tamil ===
Year	Film	Role	Notes
1960	Kalathur Kannamma	Selvam's classmate	Uncredited
1970	Enga Mama	Group dancer	Uncredited
1982	Kozhi Koovuthu		
1982	Kanneer Oru Kadal		
1983	Uruvangal Maralam		
1983	Dowry Kalyanam		
1983	Thalai Magan		
1983	Valartha Kada		
1983	Soorakottai Singakutti	Shantha	
1983	Thoongathey Thambi Thoongathey		
1983	En Veeran En Vetrivel		
1984	Osai		
1984	Anbe Odi Vaa		
1984	Komberi Mookan		
1984	Then Koodu		
1985	Needhiyin Nizhal		
1985	Veettukkari		
1985	Navagraha Nayagi		
1985	Mangamma Sapatham		
1986	Engal Thaikulame Varuga		
1986	Viduthalai		
1987	Thirumathi Oru Vegumathi	Anandaal	
1987	Anbulla Appa		
1987	Kudumbam Oru Koyil		
1988	Dhayam Onnu		
1988	Solla Thudikkuthu Manasu		
1991	Sendhoora Devi	Devotee	

=== Telugu ===
Year	Film	Role	Notes
1986	Oka Radha Iddaru Krishnulu		
1987	Donga Kapuram		
1987	Srimathi Oka Bahumathi	Andalu	
1988	Pelli Chesi Choodu		
1989	Krishna Gari Abbayi		
1990	Prananiki Pranam		
1991	Sri Srisaila Bhramarambika Katakshamu	Nurse	
1991	Chitram! Bhalare Vichitram!!	Gajalakshmi	

=== Malayalam ===
Year	Film	Role	Notes
1985	Nerariyum Nerathu	Savithri	
1988	Loose Loose Arappiri Loose		
1989	Layanam		
