= Ravi Raghavendra =

Indian actor (born 1962)

- Born: Ravichander Raghavendra; 1 January 1962 (age 64); Madras, Tamil Nadu, India
- Occupation: Actor
- Years active: 1986–present
- Spouse: Lakshmi
- Children: Anirudh Ravichander; Vaishnavi
- Relatives: Rajinikanth (brother-in-law); Y. G. Mahendran (brother-in-law); Latha Rajinikanth (sister)

Ravichander Raghavendra (1 January 1962), is an Indian actor who appears in Tamil films and television serials.

== Career ==
Ravi has appeared on television and in films since the 1980s, often playing supporting roles in Visu's films. He has also worked in theatre. Some of his film credits include Neethaane En Ponvasantham (2012), Zero (2016), and Oke Oka Jeevitham.

== Personal life ==
Ravi is married to Lakshmi, a dancer by profession. They have a son named Anirudh Ravichander, who is a music director. In 2014, Ravi met the police following a complaint about a controversial music video which Anirudh had uploaded to YouTube, and assured investigators that the video had been taken down.

He is also the brother-in-law of actor Rajnikanth.

== Filmography ==
=== Films ===
- All films are in Tamil, unless otherwise noted.

| Year | Film | Role | Notes |
|---|---|---|---|
| 1984 | Vaai Sollil Veeranadi | Senthilnathan | Lead role; credited as Raghavendra |
| 1986 | Anandha Kanneer | Raghu | |
| 1987 | Kadhal Parisu | K. K. Bahadur | |
| 1990 | Varavu Nalla Uravu | Ilango | |
| 1990 | Vedikkai En Vaadikkai | Poovizhi Raasan | |
| 1993 | Dhool Parakuthu | Police officer | |
| 1999 | Padayappa | Ravi Chelliya | |
| 2003 | Diwan | Surya | |
| 2011 | Vaanam | Kidney Transplant Surgeon | |
| 2012 | Kadhalil Sodhappuvadhu Yeppadi | Prabhu | |
| 2012 | Neethaane En Ponvasantham | Krishnan | |
| 2012 | Yeto Vellipoyindhi Manasu | Krishna | Telugu film |
| 2013 | Moondru Per Moondru Kadal | Varun's father | |
| 2014 | Kadhal Solla Aasai | Ravikanth | |
| 2014 | Oru Kanniyum Moonu Kalavaanikalum | | |
| 2014 | Idhuvum Kadandhu Pogum | Kumar | |
| 2016 | Zero | Vijay Kumar | |
| 2016 | 54321 | Vikram's father | |
| 2019 | Thumbaa | Varsha's father | |
| 2022 | Kaathuvaakula Rendu Kaadhal | Fake psychiatrist | |
| 2022 | Rocketry: The Nambi Effect | Vikram Sarabhai | |
| 2022 | Oke Oka Jeevitham | Ravichandra | Telugu film |
| 2022 | Kanam | Ravichandran | |
| 2024 | Kanguva | Francis' father | |
| 2024 | Sorgavaasal | Mohan | |
| 2025 | Vidaamuyarchi | Dr Manohar Chandrasekhar | |
| 2025 | Coolie | Vikram Singh | |

=== Television ===
- Guhan
- Annamalai
- Roja
- Vande Mataram
- Veettukku Veedu Lootty
- Sollathan Ninaikiren
- Nilavai Thedi – played the role of Revanth, a chess player, who finds his lover through a series of letters sent by her.
- Manikoondu
