= Vedikkai En Vadikkai =

1990 film directed by Visu

- Title card
- Directed by: Visu
- Written by: Visu
- Produced by: G. Venkateswaran
- Starring: S. V. Shekhar; Kishmu; Dilip; Ravi Raghavendra; Rekha; Pallavi; Manorama; Visu
- Cinematography: N. Balakrishnan
- Edited by: Ganesh–Kumar
- Music by: Shankar–Ganesh
- Production company: GV Films
- Release date: 29 June 1990
- Country: India
- Language: Tamil

Vedikkai En Vadikkai (transl. Fun is my routine) is a 1990 Indian Tamil-language comedy drama film, written and directed by Visu and produced by GV Films. The film stars himself, S. V. Shekhar, Dilip, Ravi Raghavendra, Rekha, Pallavi and Manorama. It was released on 29 June 1990.

== Plot ==
Bhuvaneswari and her husband Matrubhootham do not speak to each other due to a difference of opinion which happened many years ago, although they live together. Matrubhootham also hates Bhuvaneswari's relatives. They have two sons Sarangapani, Poovizhirajan and a daughter Parijatham. Parijatham who works at a type-writing institute, loves the owner of the institute Venkatachalam. Poovizhirajan is a poet, and is physically attracted to Urvasi, who is one of his biggest fans, and is the daughter of wealthy businessman Sundaresa Mudaliar.

Kavisattai Kandhasamy is Bhuvaneswari's brother, and lives with his wife Deivanayagi and daughter Uma. Their family is lower middle class and has little money, as Kandhasamy does not work and repeatedly interferes in other people's personal problems. One such incident happens when Kandhasamy resolves the dispute between a husband and a wife on the road. The husband says that he is dark skinned and so is his wife, but their baby is fair skinned, and hence suspects his wife. Kandhasamy gives him a betel leaf, nut and lime and asks him to chew it. He says that since the ingredients are green, black and white in colour, the husband's mouth should have only one of these three colours. The husband realises that his mouth will be red after chewing this, and hence apologises and takes his baby and wife and leaves, having learnt a lesson. Later Kandhasamy receives a letter from Bhuvaneswari's house asking him to visit. Deivanayagi wants Kandhasamy to use this opportunity to re-unite the two families, so that Uma can be married off to one of Bhuvaneswari's sons.

The letter was written by Parijatham who asks Kandhasamy to help her marry Venkatachalam. Kandhasamy meets Venkatachalam's father Sivagnyaanam, and fools him by saying that he is a relative of a freedom fighter named Pathamadai Pattabiraman. Sivagnyaanam who is trying to get his freedom fighter father Aalolasingam to write the property and wealth in Sivagnyaanam's name sees this alliance as an opportunity to impress Aalolasingam who would definitely like a freedom fighter's relative. Sivagyaanam meets with Bhuvaneswari's family and agree on the wedding. Bhuvaneswari realises that its not possible to conduct the wedding, as they do not have sufficient money. Bhuvaneswari thinks of a plan. She is friends with the wife of Rajapandi Thevar, and likes their daughter Neelaveni. She wants to get Neelaveni married to Sarangapani, so that she can use the dowry from Rajapandi Thevar, to spend on Parijatham's wedding. Sarangapani initially rejects the alliance saying that if he marries Neelaveni, it might cause problems, because Neelaveni was born to a Thevar and Iyengar, and raised by the Thevar's second wife who is a Chettiar, and hence such inter-caste relationships may not go well in the eyes of the society. Instead he tells his mother that he would be willing to marry Kandhasamy's daughter. But Bhuvaneswari tells Kandhasamy that if Sarangapani marries his daughter, then she will not get the money to conduct Parijatham's wedding. Hence she promises her brother that she will fix Poovizhirajan's wedding with his daughter, on the condition that Kandhasamy helps Sarangapani meet Neelaveni and makes him agree to marry her. Kandhasamy agrees to this plan, and plays cupid between Sarangapani and Neelaveni. Sarangapani falls in love with Neelaveni.

Meanwhile, Poovizhirajan seduces Urvasi with his romantic and erotic poems, later sleeps with her, and then ditches her. While Aalolasingam and Sivagnyaanam are at Bhuvaneswari's house to receive the wedding invite card, they question Kandhasamy about Pathamadai Pattabiraman, as Aalolasingam is not able to recollect anybody by that name. Matrubhootham happens to meet Rajapandi Thevar at a temple and discovers that unbeknownst to him, Bhuvaneswari and Kavisattai Kandhasamy have arranged Sarangapani's wedding with Neelaveni. All of them go from the temple to Bhuvaneswari's house. Urvasi also comes to Poovizhirajan's house to seek justice for her. Meanwhile, Aalolasingam, Rajapandi Thevar, Urvasi, Kandhasamy and Matrubhootham have an argument. Matrubhootham asks Kandhasamy to get out of the house, as he is the troublemaker. But Kandhasamy challenges everyone that he will conduct all three weddings of Parijatham, Neelaveni and Urvasi within a week.

Kandhasamy and Venkatachalam stage a fake kidnapping of Aalolasingam and put the blame on Matrubhootham and Sivagnyaanam to divert the families' attention from the real marriage issues. Kandhasamy talks to Rajapandi Thevar to recover Bhuvaneswari's jewels and vessels from the pawn broker shop. Kandhasamy asks Sundaresa Mudaliar and Urvasi to set up camp outside Poovizhirajan's house and protest until Poovizhirajan confesses. Matrubhootham and Poovizhirajan talk to Deivanayagi and try to marry Uma to Poovizhirajan, in order to stop Urvasi's protests. Despite the obstacles, Kandhasamy succeeds. At the end of the movie, Matrubhootham and Bhuvaneswari reconcile, Poovizhirajan confesses to have cheated Urvasi and agrees to marry her, Aalolasingam agrees to have his grandson marry Parijatham after being impressed with Kandhasamy's efforts, Sarangapani marries Neelaveni, Deivanayagi leaves her husband Kandhasamy after he fails to get Uma married. The climax shows Kandhasamy and Uma alone, and praying to lord Murugan to help get an alliance for Uma.

== Cast ==
- S. V. Shekhar as Saarangapani
- Kishmu as Matrubhootham
- Dilip as Venkatachalam
- Raghav as Poovizhirajan
- Rekha as Neelaveni
- Pallavi as Urvasi
- Manorama as Bhuvaneswari
- Vadivukkarasi as Deivanayagi
- Dhivya as Parijatham
- Baby Indira as Uma
- Poornam Viswanathan as Aalolasingam
- Vennira Aadai Moorthy as Sivagnyaanam
- Delhi Ganesh as Sundaresa Mudaliar
- K. K. Soundar as Rajapandi Thevar
- Kutty Padmini as Mahalakshmi
- Achamillai Gopi as Mahalakshmi's husband
- M. S. Bhaskar as Pachaiyappa, the man who doubts his baby
- Sethu Vinayagam as Police Inspector
- Visu as Kavisattai Kandhasamy

== Soundtrack ==
The soundtrack was composed by Shankar–Ganesh, with lyrics by Idhayachandran.

Track listing
No.	Title	Singer(s)	Length
1.	"Kanakuruvi Thaana"	Mano
2.	"Jayathi Jayathi"	K. S. Chithra
3.	"Kanna Un Kuyilai"	Vani Jairam
4.	"Maanamulla Roshamulla"	S. P. Sailaja

== Reception ==
N. Krishnaswamy of The Indian Express praised the performances of the lead actors and called Balakrishnan's cinematography "component". P. S. S. of Kalki praised the cast and humour and called it a special tonic produced by doctor Visu.
