= Vaai Sollil Veeranadi =

- Title card
- Directed by: Visu
- Written by: Visu
- Produced by: K. S. Srinivasan; K. S. Sivaraman
- Starring: Raghavendar; Sadhana
- Cinematography: N. Balakrishnan
- Edited by: N. R. Kittu
- Music by: Vijay Anand
- Production company: Vasan Brothers
- Release date: 21 September 1984
- Country: India
- Language: Tamil

Vaai Sollil Veeranadi (transl. A warrior in name only) is a 1984 Indian Tamil-language film written and directed by Visu. The film stars Raghavendar and Sadhana, with Y. G. Mahendran, Vanitha, Visu and Manorama in supporting roles. It was released on 21 September 1984.

== Cast ==
- Raghavendar
- Sadhana
- Y. G. Mahendran
- Vanitha
- Visu
- Manorama
- Kishmu
- G. Srinivasan
- Kuladeivam Rajagopal
- Janagaraj
- Dilip
- Kuriakose Ranga
- Anuradha
- Sethu Vinayagam
- Typist Gopu

== Soundtrack ==
The soundtrack was composed by Vijay Anand.

Track listing
No.	Title	Lyrics	Singer(s)	Length
1.	"Kanni Ponnu"	Jyothi Pandian	S. Janaki	4:25
2.	"Idazh Naadagam"	Jyothi Pandian	S. P. Balasubrahmanyam, Vani Jairam	4:03
3.	"Paaru Ennai Paaru"	Idhaya Chandran	S. P. Sailaja	4:15
4.	"Kaaman Geetham"	Muthulingam	S. Janaki	4:31
5.	"En Kungumam"	Muthulingam	Malaysia Vasudevan, P. Susheela	4:24
Total length:				21:38

== Release and reception ==
Vaai Sollil Veeranadi was released on 21 September 1984. Jayamanmadhan of Kalki appreciated the dialogues, natural comedy and music.
