= Srimathi Oka Bahumathi =

- Theatrical release poster
- Directed by: Visu
- Written by: Visu
- Produced by: Dayakar–Karunakar
- Starring: Chandra Mohan; Naresh; Jayasudha; Visu
- Cinematography: N. Balakrishnan
- Edited by: Ganesh–Kumar
- Music by: Shankar–Ganesh
- Production company: Pavan Enterprises
- Distributed by: Anil Enterprise; Kalyan Films
- Release date: 23 October 1987
- Country: India
- Language: Telugu

Srimathi Oka Bahumathi (transl. Mrs. is a gift) is a 1987 Indian Telugu-language drama film, written and directed by Visu. A remake of his Tamil-language film Thirumathi Oru Vegumathi (1987), the film stars Chandra Mohan, Naresh, Jayasudha, and Visu himself, reprising his role from the original.

== Cast ==
- Chandra Mohan
- Naresh
- Tulsiram as Krishna
- Jayasudha
- Aruna
- Kalpana
- P. R. Varalakshmi
- Bindu Ghosh as Andalu
- Visu as Bhadrachalam Rudraiah
- Kishmu

== Production ==
Visu, who was credited as the storywriter for the remake films Manishiko Charithra (1984) and Samsaram Oka Chadarangam (1987), made his directorial debut in Telugu through this film. The film was presented by A. V. K. Reddy of Savera Hotel in Chennai (formerly known as Madras).

== Soundtrack ==
The music was composed by Shankar–Ganesh.

All lyrics are written by Sirivennela Seetharama Sastry.

Track listing
No.	Title	Singer(s)	Length
1.	"Aadade Adharam"	S. P. Balasubrahmanyam
2.	"Akka Akka"	S. P. Balasubrahmanyam, P. S. Ranganath
3.	"Vateyaraa"	S. P. Sailaja
4.	"Keelu Bommaga Nenu"	Vani Jayaram
5.	"Ningini Viduchina"	K. J. Yesudas

== Box office ==
The film ran for over a hundred days in fourteen centres. The success celebration took place on 31 January 1988 at Savera Hotel with C. Narayana Reddy attending as the chief guest.
