= Meendum Savithri =

- Poster of the Tamil version
- Directed by: Visu
- Written by: Visu
- Based on: Meendum Savithiri (novel) by Visu
- Produced by: B. Nagi Reddi
- Starring: Revathi; Saranya Ponvannan; Nizhalgal Ravi; Raja
- Cinematography: N. Balakrishnan
- Edited by: Ganesh Kumar
- Music by: Devendran
- Production company: Vijaya Pictures
- Release dates: 9 February 1996 (Tamil); 1 March 1996 (Telugu)
- Running time: 140 minutes
- Country: India
- Languages: Tamil; Telugu

Meendum Savithri (transl. Savithri, Again) is a 1996 Indian Tamil-language drama film directed by Visu and produced by B. Nagi Reddi. It stars Revathi, Saranya Ponvannan, Nizhalgal Ravi and Raja, with Ramesh Aravind, Visu, Nagesh, Jai Ganesh, Annapurna, Seetha and Pandu playing supporting roles. The film, released on 9 February 1996, is based on Visu's novel of the same name that was serialised in Ananda Vikatan, and bombed at the box office. It was simultaneously made in Telugu as Neti Savithri (transl. Today's Savithri) with Gollapudi Maruti Rao replacing Visu.

== Plot ==
Manju, an outspoken woman, works in a small company. She lives with her father Narayana Moorthy who tries to reform the people as much as possible. Belonging to a middle-class family, she cannot provide a dowry for her potential groom. One day, Manju comes across an innovative advertisement : a groom is looking for a bride without any dowry. The groom is Vasudevan who seems to be the perfect future husband. When Manju and Narayana Moorthy meet his family, Narayana Moorthy is shocked. Vasudevan's father Ramamoorthy became mentally ill when his business failed, his sister Gayathri became mentally ill when someone raped her, his brother Bhaskar is a drunkard and his mother is an asthma patient. Finally, Manju and Vasudevan get married. During the first night, Vasudevan beats her and falls down unconscious.

Vasudevan's family was, in fact, acting, they are perfectly all right but they are scared of something. The truth is that Vasudevan was already married to Uma. Uma was initially in love with Narasimman, a do-gooder however she later rejects him after discovering that he is a con man, she marries Vasudevan. Narasimman in order to extract money from her creates photographs showing him and Uma being married which leads to Vasudevan assume that Uma had cheated him. Vasudevan gets affected psychologically due to her absence in order to make him normal his whole family pretends to be suffering from problems.

Manju then plans to expose Narasimman's cruel ways. She and Vasudevan's family disguise themselves as a rich family from Mumbai with Bhaskar disguising himself as broker Ananthakrishnan. Narayana Moorthy who learns of the plan also joins the act as her rich father. Narayana Moorthy though not happy with the developments has to go along with the act after Manju threatens to commit suicide. During the engagement between Manju and Narasimman, Narasimman's evil ways are exposed and he is arrested by the police.

In the end, Manju unites Vasu and Uma by throwing her thali inside the temple hundi and resumes her daily routine.

== Cast ==
Cast (Tamil)	Cast (Telugu)	Role (Tamil)	Role (Telugu)
Revathi		Manju	Manju
Saranya Ponvannan		Uma	Uma
Nizhalgal Ravi		Narasimman	Narasimman
Raja		Vasudevan	Vasudevan
Ramesh Aravind		Anandakrishnan	Anandakrishna
Visu	Gollapudi Maruti Rao	Narayana Moorthy	Minor Babu
Nagesh		Ramamoorthy	Ramamoorthy
Jai Ganesh		Chandramouli	Chandramouli
Annapurna		Vasudevan's mother	Vasudevan's mother
Seetha		Gayathri	Gayathri
Pandu	Rallapalli	Gajendran	Gajendra
Kumarimuthu			
Jamuna Srinivasan		Meenatchi	Meenatchi
Oru Viral Krishna Rao	Chitti Babu		
Idichapuli Selvaraj	K. K. Sharma		
Ganga	Dham		
Omakuchi Narasimhan (Note: Credited in Telugu as Juttu Narasimham.)		Pugazhenthi	Pullaiah
Unknown	Saakshi Siva	Auto driver	Auto driver

== Soundtrack ==
The music was composed by Devendran, with lyrics written by Piraisoodan for the Tamil version.

Tamil
No.	Title	Singer(s)	Length
1.	"Naatukulla Romba"	Mano, Chorus	4:31
2.	"Pethava Unnai"	K. J. Yesudas	4:19
3.	"Avaravar Thalai"	K. S. Chithra	3:58
4.	"Indha Naal"	Mano	4:58
5.	"Vel Murugan"	Mano	3:48
6.	"Naan Onru Thedi"	K. S. Chithra	3:54
Total length:			25:38

Telugu
No.	Title	Singer(s)	Length
1.	"Evare Kannavaru"	K. J. Yesudas	4:24
2.	"Jeevitham Nekankitham"	Mano	5:04
3.	"Nee Kothurudi"	K. S. Chithra	4:18
4.	"Kailasagirini"	Mano	1:18
5.	"Andariki Thalaratha"	K. S. Chithra	4:05
6.	"Ney Korukundi"	K. S. Chithra	3:54
Total length:			23:03

== Reception ==
K. Vijiyan of New Straits Times wrote, "With Visu's strong dialogues and his customary wisecracks, Meendum Savithri proves to be an entertaining movie, teaching proper values at the same time". Kalki wrote the film was interesting and realistic in first half which went in a flow but felt Visu struggled and stuttered in second half. D. S. Ramanujam of The Hindu wrote that Visu "translated the spirit and content of the theme on the screen in an appreciable manner. He has avoided the tiresome fights and double meaning dialogue and kept his ``mind twisting'' arguments to just a couple". Zamin Ryot gave Neti Savithri a negative review, saying it has disappointed the women audience, and the subject is not reflecting the actual society. The critic added that there are no crowd pleasing elements suitable to Telugu audiences, as the director tried to imitate Tamil nativity in some of the scenes, and went overboard by creating situations like throwing the thaali inside the temple.
