= Dowry Kalyanam =

- Title card
- Directed by: Visu
- Written by: Visu
- Based on: Dowry Kalyana Vaibhogame by Visu
- Produced by: S. Suseela
- Starring: Visu; Vijayakanth; Srividya; M. N. Nambiar; Viji; S. Ve. Shekher
- Music by: M. S. Viswanathan
- Production company: Charuchithra Films
- Release date: 1 July 1983
- Running time: 138 minutes
- Country: India
- Language: Tamil

Dowry Kalyanam (transl. Dowry Marriage) is a 1983 Indian Tamil-language comedy drama film, written and directed by Visu and produced by S. Suseela. The film stars Visu, Vijayakanth, Srividya, S. Ve. Shekher and Viji. It is based on Visu's play Dowry Kalyana Vaibhogame. The films depicts the relationship between two best friends. One of them is financially struggling, and he increasingly depends financially on his friend. When an arranged marriage between his friend and his sister is proposed, the impoverished friend tries to collect the necessary dowry on his own. The film was released on 1 July 1983.

== Plot ==
In Thiruninravur, Ganesan and Ethiraj are best friends and colleagues. Ethiraj, a widower, lives with his toddler daughter and struggles with alcoholism. Ganesan is married to Uma and has a sister Gowri and a younger brother, Natesan. As a clerk, Ganesan's meager earnings force him to frequently borrow from the affluent Ethiraj and Rowthar, a Muslim grocery shop owner. Uma advises Ganesan to start looking for a suitable groom for Gowri. Meanwhile, Ethiraj's mother notices the close bond between Gowri and Ethiraj's daughter and proposes a marriage between Gowri and Ethiraj to Ganesan. Ganesan abruptly rejects the offer accusing Ethiraj of befriending him only to marry Gowri, which Ethiraj denies, saying he considers Gowri as his sister. A heated argument ensues between Ganesan and Ethiraj, creating a rift in their friendship. Ethiraj tearfully leaves, challenging Ganesan to never meet him again.

Ganesan vows to give his sister a grand wedding. He meets the marriage broker, Neelakanda Sastrigal, and selects the photograph of Manggupathi as the potential groom for Gowri. Manggupathi is the only son of Acharapakkam Raja Kalavai and Arcot Rushyendramani. To cover the expenses for the groom's family visit, Ganesan is forced to pawn Uma's gold bangle for Rs.200. However, Rowthar stops him and instead lends him Rs.200 in exchange for Ganesan's cheaper watch. During their visit to Ganesan's house, he and his family make a concerted effort to conceal their poverty, and the initial meeting concludes successfully. Subsequently, Ganesan and Uma visit Manggupathi's parents, only to discover that they are demanding a dowry. Rushyendramani, a domineering matriarch, wields significant control over the family, while Raja Kalavai, her husband, is intimidated by her. Rushyendramani demands Rs.15,000 as dowry, but Uma negotiates with Neelakanda Sastri, to reduce the amount to Rs.8,000. However, she also requests forty pounds of gold jewelry. Uma successfully bargains down to 25 pounds and Rs.7,500 worth of silver utensils as dowry. Finally, Rushyendramani presents a comprehensive list of tasks and dowry requirements.

To raise funds for Gowri's wedding, Ganesan writes a letter to his relatives seeking financial assistance. His paternal uncle, Jalandhar Subbudu, and maternal uncle, DIG Kuselan, pledge their support. Additionally, Ganesan's grandmother, who is in her 80s, decides to contribute by doing menial cooking work. Ganesan's manager suggests that he utilize his provident fund, take a loan, and collect gift money from his office colleagues to aid in the wedding expenses. Rowther also offers to provide all the necessary groceries for the wedding. Jalandhar Subbudu visits Thiruninravur and hands over Rs.2,000, while Natesan secures a job at Kousalya Chit Funds, which requires a deposit of Rs. 1,000 and Ganesan pays for it. Ganesan is forced to write a letter to Rushyendramani, informing her of his inability to meet the agreed-upon dowry. However, since Rushyendramani is out of town, Raja Kalavai visits Ganesan instead. Subbudu cleverly negotiates with Raja Kalavai, convincing him to accept a reduced dowry of 10 pounds of gold, rather than the previously agreed-upon 25 pounds. Meanwhile, Jalandhar Subbudu's wife falls ill, prompting Uma to return his Rs.1,000 to facilitate his immediate return to Jalandhar. Consequently, the entire Rs. 2,000 provided by Subbudu is utilized.

On the eve of the wedding, tragedy strikes when Rowther is involved in a road accident. Despite his injuries, he ensures that the groceries are delivered as scheduled before succumbing to his injuries. Ganesan's brother, Natesan misappropriates Rs.1,865 from his company funds to cover the wedding expenses. Ganesan's grandmother, who has been diligently saving, contributes Rs.700 from her pocket. A mysterious individual claiming to be Kuselan begins to offer assistance, and Ganesan mistakenly assumes he is his uncle, DIG Kuselan. The groom's family, accompanied by their extended relatives, arrives at the wedding hall and begins to issue orders, taunt, and demand various items from Ganesan's family, forcing them to bear the entire expense. When Rushyendramani berates Uma for not arranging a cook, Ganesan's grandmother steps forward, introducing herself as a cook and taking on the responsibility. Ganesan finds himself in a precarious situation, struggling to cover all the expenses, including damages, taxi rentals, and other losses. Amidst the chaos, a thief flees from pursuing police and blends into the crowd at the wedding hall. Witnessing the poverty and Ganesan's distress, the thief leaves his stolen money behind.

The real DIG Kuselan arrives at the wedding hall, only to find his mother, Ganesan's grandmother, being forced to work. He apologizes profusely, but she refuses to forgive him, citing his past abandonment of their family and neglect of his sister, Ganesan's mother. Before departing, DIG Kuselan provides his address to his mother, asking her to visit him if she forgives him, and offers to provide financial assistance for Gowri's wedding. Ganesan and his family remain under the impression that the imposter claiming to be Kuselan is indeed their uncle, but his true identity is eventually revealed. Ganesan is disheartened, believing that the real DIG Kuselan has yet to arrive. As the marriage procession commences, Ganesan being unable to fulfill the dowry demands, pleads with Raja Kalavai to find a solution. Raja Kalavai advises Ganesan to reveal the truth to Rushyendramani, explaining that he is unable to arrange the demanded dowry. Rushyendramani responds by issuing an ultimatum: the dowry must be paid by morning, or the marriage will be canceled. But, DIG Kuselan, who had been expecting his mother to visit him to collect the dowry money, changes his mind and arrives at the wedding hall, providing the necessary funds. Additionally, Ethiraj, who had previously vowed to sever ties with Ganesan, also appears and hands over the demanded dowry money to Rushyendramani.

With the dowry finally paid, the marriage is completed. However, Gowri requests that the borrowed gold jewelry be replaced soon, hinting that the cycle of dowry demands will continue indefinitely. Meanwhile, Neelakanda Sastrigal's elder daughter develops a romantic interest in Mangupathi's friend, Kalyanam. Finally, Ganesan's younger brother, Natesan, marries the daughter of the marriage hall owner, Karar Kandhasamy, at the same venue without a single penny of dowry being demanded by Ganesan.

== Cast ==
- Visu as Ganesan
- Vijayakanth as Ethiraj
- Srividya as Uma, Ganesan's wife
- S. Ve. Shekher as Manggupathi
- Viji as Gowri, Ganesan's sister
- Kishmu as Acharapakkam Raja Kalavai, Manggupathi's father
- Pushpalatha as Arcot Rushyendramani, Manggupathi's mother
- M. N. Nambiar as Rowthar
- Manorama as Seethalakshmi, Neelakanda Sastri's wife
- Vennira Aadai Moorthy as Karar Kandhasamy
- V. K. Ramasamy as Jalandhar Subbudu
- V. Gopalakrishnan as Delhi DIG Kuselan
- Delhi Ganesh as Ambattur Respected Volunteer Kuselan
- Gundu Kalyanam as Kalyanam
- Omakuchi Narasimhan as Gundurao, Ganesan's neighbor
- S. N. Parvathy as Ethiraj's mother
- M. R. Rajamani as Neelakanda Sastrigal
- S. R. Janaki as Ganesan's grandmother and Kuselan's mother
- R. Dilip as a thief
- T. P. Gajendran as villager (uncredited role)

== Production ==
The film was launched at AVM Studios along with the recording of song "Endhan Kannana". The film was shot at a village near Tiruvallur.

== Soundtrack ==
The music was composed by M. S. Viswanathan, with lyrics by Vaali.

Track listing
No.	Title	Singer(s)	Length
1.	"Sreeraman Sreedevi"	S. P. Balasubrahmanyam, Vani Jairam
2.	"Enthan Kannana Kannatti"	P. Jayachandran, S. P. Sailaja
3.	"Andavane Kanthirandu"	M. S. Viswanathan

== Release and reception ==
Dowry Kalyanam was released on 1 July 1983. Kalki praised the performances of Visu, Nambiar and Srividya while also praising Visu for his direction and avoiding the influence of making it look like a stage play but panned Viswanathan's music.

== Censorship controversies ==
Visu mentioned that the censor board wanted 87 cuts for the film as they were not impressed with the portrayal of the Rowther character speaking in Hindi mixed with Tamil because Rowthers speak pure Tamil. Visu then developed the scene where Rowther explains why he speaks like that, after which the film was cleared with no cuts.
