= Penmani Aval Kanmani =

- Theatrical release poster
- Directed by: Visu
- Written by: Visu
- Produced by: Rajam Balachander; Pushpa Kandaswamy
- Starring: Pratap Pothen; Seetha; Visu; Kishmu
- Cinematography: N. Balakrishnan
- Edited by: Ganesh–Kumar
- Music by: Shankar–Ganesh
- Production company: Kavithalayaa Productions
- Release date: 11 March 1988
- Running time: 147 minutes
- Country: India
- Language: Tamil

Penmani Aval Kanmani is a 1988 Indian Tamil-language comedy drama film written and directed by Visu, and produced by Kavithalayaa Productions. The film stars Pratap Pothen, Seetha, Visu and Kishmu. It was released on 11 March 1988. The film was remade in Telugu as Aadade Aadharam.

== Plot ==
Radio Mama, an elderly man, lives with his son Parandhaman, daughter-in-law Kalpana, and grandchildren. He's notorious for meddling in his neighbors' family issues, often causing problems that prompt Parandhaman to relocate frequently. Their latest move is to Palanganatham. Radio Mama observes three distinct families around their new home. Above them lives a couple, Sudha, a dominant feminist journalist, and her husband Sekar, who prioritizes his romantic relationship over family obligations. Sudha's assertive nature extends to mistreating her in-laws. Next door resides a matriarchal family, where the mother-in-law tyrannizes her daughter-in-law, Uma, a poor woman, over dowry demands. Uma's husband, Dilip, blindly trusts his mother, unaware of her cruelty. The mother-in-law even forbids Uma from having a physical relationship with Dilip until the dowry is paid. Across from them lives a dysfunctional family, where the father and son are habitual drunkards. The father's wife, Vadivu, works menial jobs to support the family, while the son's wife, Meenakshi, manages the household.

On their first day in the new neighborhood, Radio Mama's enthusiasm leads him to forget about getting breakfast for his grandchildren. To avoid potential conflicts, Parandhaman requests his father to pack lunch and visit nearby temples instead. Radio Mama uses this opportunity to visit Sudha at her workplace, introducing himself as a fan. However, he subtly criticizes her feminist stance and treatment of her in-laws. Sudha, angered, confronts her in-laws, suspecting they complained to Radio Mama about their family issues. Radio Mama feigns innocence, and Parandhaman locks him in a room to maintain the illusion. The next day, Radio Mama notices Uma's distress and learns about her mother-in-law's cruelty. He discovers that Uma's mother-in-law is forcing her to abort her child over her unmet dowry demands and has burned her leg with a hot iron rod as punishment for consummating her marriage. Uma keeps the abuse hidden from her husband, Dilip. To help Uma, Radio Mama meets the lady doctor treating her, pretending to be Uma's father. He reveals the truth about Uma's mother-in-law's cruelty and requests the doctor to delay the abortion. Radio Mama frequently encounters the drunkard father and son duo, who often get humiliated in public. They also barge into Radio Mama's family home at midnight, citing petty reasons.

Radio Mama meets Sudha's father-in-law, who is struggling due to his family's neglect. He learns that Sudha and Sekar refused to help with their daughter's baby shower ceremony and instead, accused the father-in-law of theft. Radio Mama takes Sudha's father-in-law in, convincing Parandhaman to let him stay for one night. Tragically, the father-in-law passes away the next morning. After being sent to an old-age home, Radio Mama transforms it into a joyful place. He tells the other inmates that he chose to live there voluntarily, which prompts Parandhaman to ask him to return home. However, Radio Mama declines, and it's only after the inmates' persuasion that he agrees to return to his son's home. To help Kamala, who is struggling with Sudha's mistreatment, Radio Mama takes Kamala to Sudha's workplace, where Sudha's behavior is exposed to Ambujam Viswanath, Sudha's boss, and Sekar realizes his mistake in neglecting his parents after Radio Mama's advice. After an argument between Sekar and Sudha, Sudha drives Sekar and Kamala out of the house. As a result, Sudha loses her job, for which Ambujam Viswanath explains to Radio Mama that only solitude can help people realize their mistakes. Sudha, furious about her family issues being exposed in the journal, confronts the editor, Ambujam Viswanath, who turns out to be Sudha's mother. Ambujam advises Sudha to be a better daughter-in-law and takes her to apologize to Sekar and his mother, Kamala. Although Sekar initially refuses to forgive Sudha due to her false accusations against his father, Kamala intervenes and takes the blame upon herself, claiming her husband stole the money. Kamala's selflessness moves Sudha, and she pleads guilty, leading to a complete transformation in her behavior.

Radio Mama uses Ambujam's advice to help Vadivu by suggesting that she leave her husband temporarily. However, the plan backfires, and the drunkard remarries. Meenakshi, the wife of the drunkard's son, replicates the plan and goes into hiding at Radio Mama's house. The plan works, and the son reforms, sets up a mobile food stall, and stops drinking. Meanwhile, the drunkard son's rebuke prompts Vadivu, his mother, to defend her husband. Overwhelmed by her husband's addiction, Vadivu buys liquor and shares a drink with him. However, this act sparks a change in the drunkard father, who throws away the liquor and reforms. He joins his son's food stall business, and soon, Meenakshi reunites with her husband.

Meanwhile, Dilip's mother discovers Uma's pregnancy and learns that Radio Mama impersonated Uma's father to prevent an abortion. She confronts Radio Mama, but he challenges her dowry-seeking behavior, declaring it a societal problem. Dilip's mother plans to file a false case against Uma's father, accusing him of cheating her out of money. However, Uma burns the fake affidavits, and in a fit of rage, her mother-in-law pours boiling water on Uma. Radio Mama informs Dilip about the true extent of Uma's suffering at the hands of his mother. Under Radio Mama's guidance, Dilip pretends to consider divorcing Uma, and his mother eagerly agrees. However, Dilip reveals his true feelings, stating that he prefers his wife over his mother. Meanwhile, Uma misunderstands Dilip's intentions and plans to commit suicide, writing letters to Dilip, Radio Mama, and the police. Uma hides her plan from her father and embarks on a trip to Thekkady, intending to end her life. However, Radio Mama, along with Dilip and his reformed mother-in-law, rushes to Thekkady to rescue her. Just as Uma is about to jump into the water, Radio Mama stops her and stages a ruse, informing her that her mother-in-law and Dilip are arrested, but to Uma's surprise, Dilip and his mother are indeed there to rescue her. Uma reunites with Dilip, and her mother-in-law has a change of heart.

With all the neighborhood issues resolved, Parandhaman is eager to move to a new place to help solve new problems. Radio Mama reluctantly agrees, despite the house owner not requesting them to vacate.

== Cast ==
- Visu as Radio Mama
- Pratap Pothen as Parandhaman, Radio Mama's son
- Kishmu as Vadivu's husband
- Delhi Ganesh as Sekar's father
- G. Srinivasan as Uma's father
- Dilip as Dilip, Uma's husband
- Ilavarasan as Sekar, Sudha's husband
- Aravind as Meenakshi's husband
- Seetha as Uma, Dilip's wife
- Madhuri as Meenakshi
- Aruna as Sudha, Sekar's wife
- Manorama as Ambujam Viswanath
- M. N. Rajam as Dilip's mother
- Vadivukkarasi as Vadivu
- Kamala Kamesh as Kamala, Sekar's mother
- Kutty Padmini as Kalpana, Parandhaman's wife
- Kula Deivam V. R. Rajagopal as an oldage home inmate
- Typist Gopu as an oldage home inmate
- Omakuchi Narasimhan as an oldage home inmate
- Sethu Vinayagam as an oldage home incharge
- LIC Narasimhan as a physician
- Meenakshi Amma as an oldage home inmate
- Puliyur Saroja as a cook in the oldage home

== Soundtrack ==
Soundtrack was composed by Shankar–Ganesh. The lyrics were penned by Vaali.

Track listing
No.	Title	Singer(s)	Length
1.	"Moongililai Kaadugale" (male)	S. P. Balasubrahmanyam	4:33
2.	"Moongililai Kaadugale" (female)	Vani Jairam	3:58
3.	"Naanum Oru"	S. P. Balasubrahmanyam	3:52
4.	"Penmani Aval"	S. P. Balasubrahmanyam	4:13
5.	"Aarambame"	Malaysia Vasudevan, T. L. Maharajan, S.P. Sailaja	7:57
Total length:			24:33

== Reception ==
The Indian Express wrote that Visu achieved what he sought in an "engaging manner", and also appreciated the song "Moongililai Kaadugale". Jayamanmadhan of Kalki praised the acting of star cast and humour and concluded after entering the theatre one can laugh and definitely leave after enjoying the film.
