= Anandha Kanneer =

1986 film by K. Vijayan

- Theatrical release poster
- Directed by: K. Vijayan
- Screenplay by: K. Vijayan
- Story by: Bharath
- Produced by: Shanti Narayanasamy; T. Manohar
- Starring: Sivaji Ganesan; Lakshmi
- Cinematography: Tiwari
- Edited by: Chezhian
- Music by: Shankar–Ganesh
- Production company: Sivaji Productions
- Release date: 7 March 1986
- Country: India
- Language: Tamil

Anandha Kanneer (transl. Tears of joy) is a 1986 Indian Tamil-language drama film directed by K. Vijayan. Based on the play Puthiyathor Ulagam Seivom (transl. We will make a new world) by Bharath, the film stars Sivaji Ganesan and Lakshmi. It was released on 7 March 1986.

== Plot ==
The story deals with the troubles faced by the honest and upright protagonist, Kalyanaraman Iyer, in solemnizing the arranged marriage of his last daughter. Troubles arise not only of Dowry from the prospective in-laws but also his own daughter-in-law breaking their joint family taking away the support of earning elder son considering Kalyanaraman Iyer is retired now. To add to his woes, his second son, who just got a job enters into an inter-religion marriage forcing them to ignore him for this would add complications to his own daughter's marriage. Above all, the third son is jobless and quick to anger too. Trying to navigate through the myriad of complications, Kalyanaraman Iyer sells his kidney for money to solemnize the marriage prompting the broken family to reunite at the hospital bed.

== Cast ==
- Sivaji Ganesan as Kalyanaraman Iyer
- Lakshmi as Parvatham
- Jayashree as Radha
- Visu as Paapa
- V. K. Ramasamy as Damodar
- Major Sundarrajan as Urology doctor
- Thengai Srinivasan as Lady Krishna Iyer
- Rajeev as Anantharama Iyer, the eldest son of Kalyanarama Iyer
- Nizhalgal Ravi as Rajaraman Iyer second son.
- Ravi Raghavendra as Raghu, Kalyanarama Iyer third son
- Rajalakshmi
- J. Lalitha as Arockiyaraj mary
- Devi Lalitha as Manju
- Vennira Aadai Moorthy
- Janagaraj
- Oru Viral Krishna Rao
- Subbini
- Senthil as Barber
- T. K. S. Natarajan as Car driver
- S.R. Veeraraghavan
- MLA Thangaraj

== Production ==
The scene where the character Manju gets married was shot at Government film studios.

== Soundtrack ==
The soundtrack was composed by Shankar–Ganesh.

Track listing
No.	Title	Lyrics	Singer(s)	Length
1.	"Engal Kudumbam Oru"	Na. Kamarasan	Malaysia Vasudevan, Vani Jairam, Ramesh
2.	"Amma Nee Vazhka"	Vaali	Malaysia Vasudevan, P. Susheela
3.	"Ninaithal Nee Vara"	Vaali	S. P. Balasubrahmanyam, Vani Jairam
4.	"Maala Podura Kalyanama?"	Pulamaipithan	S. P. Balasubrahmanyam

== Reception ==
Jayamanmadhan of Kalki called it a good family story after a long time.
