= Thoongathey Thambi Thoongathey =

1983 film by S. P. Muthuraman

- Theatrical release poster
- Directed by: S. P. Muthuraman
- Written by: Panchu Arunachalam
- Produced by: M. Saravanan; M. Balasubramaniam
- Starring: Kamal Haasan; Radha; Sulakshana
- Cinematography: Babu
- Edited by: R. Vittal
- Music by: Ilaiyaraaja
- Production company: AVM Productions
- Release date: 4 November 1983
- Country: India
- Language: Tamil

Thoongathey Thambi Thoongathey (transl. Don't Sleep Brother, Don't Sleep) is a 1983 Indian Tamil-language masala film directed by S. P. Muthuraman, starring Kamal Haasan in a double role, supported by Radha and Sulakshana. It was a blockbuster and completed a 275-day run at the box office in theatres across Tamil Nadu.

== Plot ==
Gopi is an unemployed graduate from a middle class society and Vinod is a rich graduate from high society returning from abroad after his father's death. To claim the property of Vinod, the estate manager with his mob guys assaults him and make him a drug addict by repeated injections administered by a fake doctor. Gopi's lover Padmini's father, a family friend of Vinod's father, together with Padmini, come to the estate on an excursion. Due to her curiosity, she sees Vinod and finds out that he is in a dangerous state of health due to the drug addiction. Padmini later learns that Gopi and Vinod are twins separated at birth. With the help of the house's servant, Padmini replaces Vinod with Gopi and sends him to his mother's house to save him. Gopi takes it upon himself to save the estate and properties from the hands of the estate manager, his accomplice and his assistant.

== Cast ==
- Kamal Haasan as Gopi and Vinod
- Radha as Padmini
- Sulakshana as Jayanthi
- Jamuna as Gopi and Vinod Mother
- K. A. Thangavelu as Chandrasekar
- V. K. Ramasamy
- Vinu Chakravarthy as the estate manager
- Goundamani as the assistant of the estate manager
- Janagaraj as the fake doctor
- Senthamarai as Lawyer estate manager's accomplice
- Pasi Sathya as Maid
- Bindu Ghosh as Padmini's friend
- R. Dilip as Gopi's friend
- Kuyili as Vinod's dancer
- Gundu Kalyanam as Sleeping Shop Owner
- Master Haja Sheriff
- Kullamani as Thief
- Typist Gopu as Muthaliar

== Production ==
After the success of Nadodi Mannan (1958), M. G. Ramachandran wanted his second directorial to be titled as Thoongathey Thambi Thoongathey named after the song from the film, however the project was shelved. In 1983, AVM Productions launched a film with the same name starring Kamal Haasan. Haasan portrayed two distinct roles, and the cinematographer Babu used mask shots to differentiate the roles.

The song "Vaanam Keezhe" took 17 days to be completed; this song was taken at a cost of ₹6 lakh (equivalent to ₹1.0 crore or US$110,000 in 2023). The song "Summa Nikkathinga" was shot at Vijaya Gardens. To shoot an expensive climax involving helicopter chase, the makers took inspiration from the climax of Hindi film Dil Kaa Heera at the insistence of journalist Manian by taking long shots of bursting helicopter from that film and matched along with the actors. It was Visu's idea to have a helicopter chase in the climax; to establish it Haasan's character was introduced by getting down from the helicopter.

== Soundtrack ==
The music was composed by Ilaiyaraaja and lyrics for all songs were written by Vaali. For the Malayalam-dubbed version Vasantholsavam, all lyrics were written by Poovachal Khader, and Rajasri wrote the lyrics for the Telugu-dubbed version Jalsa Rayudu. The song "Naanaga Naanillai" was well received and it based on Chandrakauns raga which resembles Hindolam. The song "Vaanam Keezhe" is set in Hamsadhvani raga. In early 2020, during the COVID-19 pandemic in India, a version of "Varuthu Varuthu" with rewritten lyrics spreading awareness about COVID-19, became viral.

Tamil
No.	Title	Singer(s)	Length
1.	"Thoongathey Thambi Thoongathey"	S. P. Balasubrahmanyam
2.	"Vaanam Keezhe"	S. P. Balasubrahmanyam
3.	"Ada Rama Nee Nammakitta"	S. Janaki
4.	"Summa Nikkathinga"	S. P. Balasubrahmanyam, S. Janaki
5.	"Naanaga Naanille"	S. P. Balasubrahmanyam
6.	"Naanaga Naanille..."	Ilaiyaraaja
7.	"Varudhu Varudhu"	S. P. Balasubrahmanyam, S. Janaki

Malayalam
No.	Title	Singer(s)	Length
1.	"Urangaathe Chumma Urangathe"	P. Jayachandran
2.	"Vaanam Thazhe Vannal"	S. P. Balasubrahmanyam
3.	"Hey Kema Ee Nammalodu"	S. Janaki
4.	"Chumma Ninneedale"	P. Jayachandran, S. Janaki
5.	"Njaanayee Njaanilla Dhanye"	P. Jayachandran
6.	"Varunnu Varunne Ini"	S. P. Balasubrahmanyam, S. Janaki

Telugu
No.	Title	Singer(s)	Length
1.	"Choope Ghatainadi"	S. P. Balasubrahmanyam, S. Janaki	4:36
2.	"Nelaku Ningi"	S. P. Balasubrahmanyam	4:17
3.	"Padaku Midisi"	S. P. Balasubrahmanyam, S. Janaki	3:58
4.	"Oh Naanna"	S. P. Balasubrahmanyam	3:05
5.	"Are Rama"	S. P. Sailaja	3:23
6.	"Telisindhi Ee"	S. P. Balasubrahmanyam	3:46
7.	"Em Kavalo Tinadiro"	S. P. Balasubrahmanyam	4:12
Total length:			26:37

== Release and reception ==
Thoongathey Thambi Thoongathey was released on 4 November 1983, and completed a 275-day run at the box office. Jayamanmadhan of Kalki praised the music and cinematography, but panned the car, helicopter chasing scenes as lifeless and concluded saying among the films that come with the label of fast-paced films, this one has a high mark. Balumani of Anna praised acting, Babu's cinematography, Ilaiyaraaja's music and humour and noted the film moves swiftly without bore.

== Bibliography ==
- Saravanan, M. (2013) [2005]. AVM 60 Cinema (in Tamil) (3rd ed.). Rajarajan Pathippagam. OCLC 1158347612.
