= Sigamani Ramamani =

2001 film directed by Visu

- DVD cover
- Directed by: Visu
- Written by: Visu
- Produced by: M. Raajendran
- Starring: S. V. Shekhar; Urvashi; Manorama; Srividya
- Cinematography: D. Baby Philips
- Edited by: Ganesh–Kumar
- Music by: Chandrabose
- Production company: Raj Television Network
- Release date: 18 May 2001
- Country: India
- Language: Tamil

Sigamani Ramamani is a 2001 Indian Tamil-language comedy drama film, written and directed by Visu. The film stars S. V. Shekhar, Urvashi, Manorama and Srividya. This was Visu's final film as director before his death in 2020.

== Plot ==
Sigamani, a middle-class man, leaves his home and family since he is fed up of various pressures that daunt him here. He is running away from his ever complaining wife, dominant mother, indifferent father, possessive sister, good-for-nothing brother-in-law and a daughter who is looking to get out of this mess in any way possible. He blames women for all his problems.

He runs away and takes a job that pays less than a watchman. His boss, played by Visu, takes interest in his predicament outraged at his premise for in the boss' life, women were everything. His mother sacrificed her life to save him, his sister sacrificed her youth to bring him up dying in the process, his wife sacrificed her marriage once she lost her legs in an accident leaving him so that he would marry again and his mother-in-law guiding and goading him to get married again.

Visu gets his father a job and an income making him take over the family again thereby bringing his mother under control. He also gets a job for his brother-in-law far off to take his sister away from the equation. He also stops his daughter from running away with a son of a pimp and puts her in a good college and hostel. With all his problems solved, Sigamani invites him for lunch when Sigamani's wife, coincidentally, identifies Visu's wife thereby solving Visu's one problem, his hunt for his missing wife.

He finds her and has lunch with his wife and his watchman. The movie concludes saying "he struggled to get her (sigamani s wife's family) together who were separated for 30 days but she brought him and his wife who were separated for 30 years without any hassle".

== Cast ==
- S. V. Shekhar as Sigamani
- Urvashi as Ramamani
- Manorama as Vidhya, Sigamani's sister
- Srividya as Sundaramoorthy's Mother-in-law
- Visu as Sundaramoorthy
- Shanmuga Sundari as Sigamani's mother
- Crazy Mohan as Sigamani's brother-in-law
- R. Sundarrajan as Neelakandan, Sigamani's father
- Kumarimuthu as Watchman Vadivelu
- Nithya Ravindran as Uma Maheswari
- Vennira Aadai Moorthy as fake psychic
- Anu Mohan as compounder
- Pandu as Police constable
- Sembuli Jegan as shop owner
- Sethu Vinayagam as inspector
- Dilip as aspiring music director
- Devi Krupa as Sigamani's daughter

== Soundtrack ==
The music was composed by Chandrabose.

Song	Singers	Lyrics	Length
"Thai Kulame"	Chandrabose	Kamakodiyan	04:52
"Yethaniyo Nadagangal"	P. Unnikrishnan	Muthulingam	04:38
"Uyir Paravai"	Nithyasree Mahadevan	Piraisoodan	04:46
"O Nadha"	Harini, Chandrabose		08:41
"Aambalaikku"	Seerkazhi Sivachidambaram, Palakkad Sriram		

== Reception ==
Chitra Mahesh of The Hindu wrote, "this kind of a film and its contents could appeal to the average male in Tamil Nadu who in all probability goes through the tugs and pulls of a family that may consist of aged parents, wife and siblings and their families. Yet the crudity with which it is expressed with no pretension of niceties or subtleties is what sets it apart from a well-done product". Malini Mannath of Chennai Online wrote "This may not be as good as the actor-director's earlier films, but the message does come through, and some of the lines and situations are quite humorous." Visual Dasan of Kalki praised Visu's direction, performances of Sekhar and Urvashi, cinematography and called sharp dialogues as both positive and negative of the film. Thayumanavar Arivalagan wrote for Indiainfo, "You can identify a Visu's movie by the title itself. As always, this time also he has presented us with a perfect family story without any confusion.Of course the story is an old one. But it does not have many twists and Visu has dealt with the movie in a light manner".
