= Vaa Magale Vaa =

- Theatrical release poster
- Directed by: Visu
- Screenplay by: Visu
- Based on: Mounam Kalaikirathu by Karaikudi Sornavel
- Produced by: N. Ramasamy
- Starring: Visu; Khushbu; Rekha; Veera Pandiyan
- Cinematography: N. Balakrishnan
- Edited by: Ganesh Kumar
- Music by: Deva
- Production company: Sri Thenandal Films
- Release date: 13 May 1994
- Running time: 145 minutes
- Country: India
- Language: Tamil

Vaa Magale Vaa (transl. Come daughter, come) is a 1994 Indian Tamil-language legal thriller film directed by Visu. The film stars Visu himself, Khushbu, Rekha and Veera Pandiyan, with Delhi Ganesh, Charle, Thyagu, T. P. Gajendran and T. S. Balachander playing supporting roles. Based on the play Mounam Kalaikirathu (transl. Silence is fading) by Karaikudi Sornavel, it was released on 13 May 1994, and did not perform well at the box office.

== Plot ==
Uma, a lawyer, is the daughter of Viswanathan, a retired judge. He treasures her a lot and treats his maids as his friends. Uma reveals that she fell in love at first sight with Pandiyan during college. Pandiyan, who reciprocates the feeling, is now a police officer but he fears his very strict father Sankar Raman. Both families agree to their wedding.

Uma sees a man behind the bar when she visits her lover at the police station one day. Although she believes he is innocent, Pandiyan will not release him because he is the prime suspect in a murder. Raman, a hapless TV mechanic, is the accused. Uma becomes his lawyer and makes him released on bail. Uma begins her investigation, soon she starts to suspect her father Viswanathan's conduct first and later his morality. What transpires next forms the rest of the story.

== Cast ==
- Visu as Viswanathan
- Khushbu as Uma
- Rekha as Kalyani
- Veera Pandiyan as Pandiyan
- Delhi Ganesh as Mahadeva Iyer
- Charle as Raman
- Thyagu as Amarnath
- T. P. Gajendran as Muthu
- T. S. Balachander as Sankar Raman
- Kullamani as Kullan
- Manager Cheena
- Ambi as Shankar Raman
- P. R. Varalakshmi as Saraswathi
- Kavithasri
- Shanmugasundari as Kullan's mother
- Sumathisri as Anjala
- Kovai Senthil
- Pandiyan in a guest appearance
- Vennira Aadai Moorthy as Bhujanga Rao (guest appearance)
- Vivek in a guest appearance

== Soundtrack ==
The music was composed by Deva, with lyrics written by Muthulingam.

Song	Singer(s)	Length
"Isai Yaavum"	S. P. Balasubrahmanyam, Suresh Peters	5:50
"Raakozhi Rangamma"	Mano, Malgudi Subha	4:33
"Ayya En"	K. S. Chithra, Malaysia Vasudevan	4:30
"Neela Vizhi"	S. P. Balasubrahmanyam, Swarnalatha	4:24
"Veenai Vandhathu"	K. S. Chithra	4:04
