= Kanmani Poonga =

- Poster
- Directed by: Visu
- Written by: Visu
- Produced by: V. Mohan
- Starring: Visu; Saritha; Kishmu
- Cinematography: N. Balakrishnan
- Edited by: N. R. Kittu
- Music by: M. S. Viswanathan
- Production company: Anandhi Films
- Release date: 14 November 1982
- Country: India
- Language: Tamil

Kanmani Poonga is a 1982 Indian Tamil-language film written and directed by Visu, who also stars with Saritha and Kishmu. It was released on 14 November 1982 and was a box office failure.

== Plot ==
Retired judge Dharmalinga Mudhaliar's son Ramkumar and his wife Uma have been childless for 13 years, sparking concern in the family. Ramkumar's mother, Thilagavathy, is determined to arrange a second marriage for Ramkumar, believing Uma is infertile. Ramkumar, a former international cricketer and all-rounder, has a troubled past. After facing criticism for his performance, he turned to alcohol and women, ultimately losing his spot on the Indian team's Australia tour. Failed as a cricketer, Ramkumar agrees to marry Uma.

At present, despite his mother's pressure, Ramkumar refuses to consider a second marriage. Dharmalinga Mudhaliar attempts various methods to help Ramkumar and Uma conceive, but all efforts are unsuccessful. Meanwhile, Uma's twin sister Rama is married to Rajagopal, and they have five children. However, their youngest child, Lakshmi, accidentally ingests Rama's medication, leading to a hospital visit. Rajagopal overhears the doctor discussing Ramkumar's actual condition - that he is impotent, not Uma. Shocked, Rajagopal shares this information with Uma thinking her to be his wife Ram, but Uma reveals she had already discovered Ramkumar's condition during a medical test and had been keeping it a secret to protect Ramkumar's ego and chose to bear the blame for their childlessness, shielding Ramkumar from the truth. She makes Rajagopal promise not to disclose this secret to anyone in the family.

Thilagavathy convinces her husband to arrange a second marriage for their son, Ramkumar. However, Ramkumar thwarts the plans by requesting the bride to provide a fertility certificate, leading to the cancellation of the marriage plans. When his parents threaten to leave the house if he doesn't agree to a second marriage, Ramkumar reluctantly leaves Uma at Rajagopal's house to cool down his parents. Uma mistakenly assumes he's pursuing a second marriage. Thilagavathy arranges Ramkumar's marriage to Bhama, but Ramkumar learns that Bhama is already planning to elope with her lover, Arun. Relieved, Ramkumar thinks Bhama won't be an issue. However, the doctor informs Uma about Ramkumar's impending second marriage. With Rajagopal's help, Uma decides to stop the engagement by falsely claiming she's pregnant.

Ramkumar discovers Uma's plan but agrees to play along, enacting as if he's excited about the pregnancy. Rama suspects that Uma's pregnancy is real and accuses Rajagopal of fathering the child, leading to tensions between Rama and Rajagopal. Thilagavathy overhears their argument and discovers that Uma's pregnancy claim is a lie. Enraged, she confronts Uma, who admits to the deception. Undeterred, Thilagavathy quickly arranges another bride for Ramkumar and schedules an engagement. Desperate to avoid a second marriage and remain loyal to Uma, Ramkumar makes a shocking decision to undergo vasectomy, who is still unaware that he is actually impotent and has been mistakenly believing Uma to be the one incapable of bearing children. Uma and Ramkumar's parents are stunned by his drastic decision.

== Cast ==
- Visu as Ramkumar
- Saritha as Uma and Rama
- Kishmu as Rajagopal
- M. R. Rajamani as Sivasami
- Kuriakose Ranga as a doctor
- Manager Cheena as a marriage broker
- Thayirvadai Desikan as a priest
- Sethu Vinayagam as Dharmalinga Mudhaliar (uncredited)
- Kuyili as Bhama (uncredited)

== Production ==
Kanmani Poonga was the second directorial venture of Visu, who also wrote it. The film was produced by V. Mohan of Anandhi Films, photographed by N. Balakrishnan and edited by N. R. Kittu.

== Soundtrack ==
The soundtrack was composed by M. S. Viswanathan.

Track listing
No.	Title	Lyrics	Singer(s)	Length
1.	"En Iravinil Iru Nilavo"	Vaali	P. S. Ramachandran
2.	"Kitta Vaadi Muttakosu"	Idhaya Chandran	S. Janaki, Malaysia Vasudevan
3.	"Kanmani Poonga Kanmani Poonga"	Vaali	B. Sasirekha, Uma Ramanan, Kovai Soundararajan, Vijayaramani

== Release and reception ==
Kanmani Poonga was released on 14 November 1982, on Diwali day. The film failed commercially. It received an A (adults only) certificate from the censor board, and Visu minimised directing such films in the future, instead favouring family entertainment. Thiraignani of Kalki praised the acting of the star cast and concluded for those who initially doubted whether sand can be spun into rope (referencing his previous film Manal Kayiru), Visu has demonstrated a beautiful nylon rope. Balumani of Anna praised the acting of the cast, music and cinematography.
