= Pattukottai Periyappa =

- Theatrical release poster
- Directed by: Visu
- Written by: Visu
- Produced by: Manivasagam
- Starring: Lakshmi; Anand Babu; Mohini; Visu
- Cinematography: N. Balakrishnan
- Edited by: Ganesh-Kumar
- Music by: Deva
- Production company: Rajapushpa Pictures
- Release date: 23 September 1994
- Running time: 144 minutes
- Country: India
- Language: Tamil

Pattukottai Periyappa is a 1994 Indian Tamil-language comedy drama film written and directed by Visu. The film stars Lakshmi, Anand Babu, Mohini and Visu. It was released on 23 September 1994.

== Plot ==
The story portrays the rivalry between a rich arrogant woman, Aranthangi Akilandeshwari and an ambitious lady, Jhansi. What ensues between them leads to Pitchumani and Uma's wedding being cancelled. How Pattukotai Periyappa, who is Pitchumani's uncle, tries to ensure the wedding goes ahead despite the two bickering women forms the rest of the story.

== Cast ==
- Lakshmi as Jawahar Nagar 'Jhansi'
- Anand Babu as Pitchumani
- Mohini as Uma
- Visu as Ramamoorthy aka Pattukottai Periyappa
- Vivek as TTR Manmadan, Jhansi's brother
- Y. Vijaya as Aranthangi Akilandeshwari
- Vinodhini as Alamelu
- S. S. Chandran as Narayanaswami, Clerk in Pitchumani's office
- Delhi Ganesh as Pitchumani's father
- Chinni Jayanth as Telex Pandian, Inspector
- Kumarimuthu as fake constable
- Madhan Bob as Office Manager
- Kavithalaya Krishnan as TB aka Tension Balu, Uma's brother
- T. V. Varadarajan as Varadan, Akilandeshwari's brother
- Manager Cheena as Alamelu's father

== Soundtrack ==
Soundtrack was composed by Deva and lyrics were written by Kalidasan.

Song	Singers	Length
"Kalyana Maalai"	Mano	05:07
"Kanney Kanney Vaa"	M. C. Sabesan, M. N. Rangababu, T. S. Ramachandran	03:54
"Palakattu Paithiyakkarane"	K. S. Chithra	04:20
"Pathinettu Vayathiniley"	S. P. Balasubrahmanyam, Bhuvana Venkatesh, Jojo	05:15
"Pettikule Yarumilla"	K. S. Chithra	03:50
"Vazhkaiye"	Lathika, K. J. Seeman	01:06
