= Chidambara Rahasiyam (film) =

- Title card
- Directed by: Visu
- Written by: Visu
- Produced by: Visalakshi Manickam
- Starring: S. Ve. Shekher; Visu; Delhi Ganesh; Arun Pandian; Ilavarasi; Manorama
- Cinematography: N. Balakrishnan
- Edited by: Ganesh–Kumar
- Music by: Shankar–Ganesh
- Production company: MM Film Circuit
- Release date: 14 December 1985
- Running time: 134 minutes
- Country: India
- Language: Tamil

Chidambara Rahasiyam (transl. The secret of Chidambaram) (Note: In Tamil vernacular, the term means "a secret that is no secret at all".) is a 1985 Indian Tamil-language comedy thriller film written and directed by Visu. It stars Visu, S. Ve. Shekher, Delhi Ganesh, Arun Pandian, Ilavarasi and Manorama. The film revolves around a simpleton (S. Ve. Shekher) who is framed for murder. Visu teams up with the local police and Arun Pandian to find the real culprits. The subject matter of the film is not related to Chidambara Rahasiyam, a Hindu religious belief. The film was released on 14 December 1985.

== Plot ==
Chidambaram, a kind-hearted simpleton from a wealthy family in Karaikudi, has harbored affection for his cousin Uma since childhood. However, Uma, now a well-educated woman, has fallen in love with Arun, her collegemate. When Chidambaram's parents, Kaathamuthu Chettiyar and Valayapatti Valliammai, propose marriage to Uma's mother, Ponnazhagi, she ridicules Chidambaram for his naivety. Determined to prove himself, Chidambaram seeks employment with Ambalavaanan, a temple trustee and a secret diamond smuggler who hires him. Unbeknownst to Chidambaram, he transports diamonds, leading to his arrest by the Aravaiyal police. After escaping, he hides in a car boot belonging to burglars. They tie up household members and loot the house. Assumed to be part of the gang, Chidambaram flees, discovering a murdered dancer, Aasha, and inadvertently leaving fingerprints on the dagger. The next morning, he returns home and witnesses the newspaper reports linking him to diamond smuggling, burglary, and murder.

Uma's father, Nachiappan visits the police station to report Chidambaram missing but discovers he is a wanted suspect. Chidambaram faces arrest by multiple police stations for the three crimes. Recognizing his innocence, Uma enlists Arun's help to bail him out and prove his innocence. The police, skeptical of Chidambaram committing all three crimes, seek CID officer Beemarao's assistance, granting Chidambaram the benefit of doubt. Upon arrival, Beemarao is attacked by goons, but Arun intervenes, saving Beemarao. Arun invites Beemarao to stay at his father Masilamani's palatial house. An attempt on Beemarao's life is foiled when he narrowly escapes a loose ceiling fan in his room. Convinced, that Chidambaram is innocent, Beemarao's investigation leads him to Ambalavaanan's house, where he observes an unusual habit: Ambalavaanan draws coconut trees while speaking on the phone.

At Masilamani's residence, the intrigued Beemarao, Arun, and Uma discuss visiting a nearby telephone availability, suspecting Ambalavaanan staged a motorcycle theft report. That night, they recreate Chidambaram's events following his arrest by the Aravaiyal police. Their investigation takes them to the petrol pump, where they discover a torn page in the telephone directory – a similar page featuring Ambalavaanan's signature coconut tree doodle. In a twist, Masilamani, Arun's father, is revealed to be the notorious "Black Cat", the mastermind behind the smuggling operation. Unbeknownst to Arun and Uma, Masilamani had been listening to Beemarao's conversation at his house. Beemarao's investigation proceeds to the dacoited house, where the inmates reveal that the thieves seemed familiar with the layout, looting swiftly. Beemarao deduces that an old woman, who visited the house a week earlier under the pretext of wire weaving, is the informer. Tracking her to the nearby village, Beemarao follows her to the thieves and overhears her providing the gang with a new target.

At Masilamani's house, Beemarao plans to capture the dacoits, unaware that Masilamani is eavesdropping. Beemarao, his team, and Arun arrive at the target location, alerting the inhabitants to remain calm. As expected, the dacoity attempt fails. Beemarao asks Arun to turn on the torchlight he's holding. Arun complies, revealing Beemarao's hidden test. Earlier, Beemarao suspected Arun of leaking information and discovered a snake inside the torch, placed to kill him. However, Arun's fearless action convinces Beemarao of his innocence, as he had removed the snake beforehand. It is revealed that Masilamani had secretly alerted the thieves, instructing them to call off the dacoity attempt, thereby foiling Beemarao's plan to capture them. Further, Beemarao's suspicions intensify as he observes Masilamani's car, caked with dirt and leaves, hinting at a secretive forest excursion to warn the thieves.

Meanwhile, Masilamani's thoughts drift to Aasha, whose betrayal in a high-stakes deal with a Sheikh had ignited his fury, culminating in her gruesome murder at her home. Beemarao's investigation at Aasha's house reveals a crucial clue: the perpetrator has a habit of drinking lemon tea. The next morning, he observes Masilamani exhibiting the same habit. Convinced of Masilamani's guilt, Beemarao informs the police that he is behind all the crimes. To trap Masilamani, Beemarao fakes a call announcing the dacoity gang's arrest. Masilamani, alarmed, plots to abduct Chidambaram and the gang en route to court. Beemarao assigns Arun to protect Chidambaram, where he fights off Ambalavaanan and his men, ultimately arresting him.

Masilamani successfully frees the supposed dacoity gang members but is stunned to discover they are actually police inspectors in disguise. Caught red-handed, Arun handcuffs his father, Masilamani, and Arun is offered a job by the police. Chidambaram is acquitted of all charges, and at Uma's marriage to Arun, Chidambaram, though heartbroken, selflessly helps Uma and Arun with the wedding preparations.

== Cast ==
- S. Ve. Shekher as Chidambaram
- Ilavarasi as Uma
- Arun Pandian as Arun
- Kishmu as Kattamuthu Chettiyar, Chidambaram's father
- Manorama as Valayapatti Valliyammai, Chidambaram's mother
- G. Srinivasan as Nachiappan, Uma's father
- Gandhimathi as Ponnazhagi, Uma's mother
- Anuradha in a special appearance
- Disco Shanti as Aasha, a dancer
- Sangili Murugan as Ambalavaanan
- Delhi Ganesh as Masilamani/ Black cat, Arun's father
- Sethu Vinayagam as Inspector Sethu
- Omakuchi Narasimhan as a van driver
- Thayir Vadai Desikan
- LIC Narasimhan as a victim of robbery
- T. P. Gajendran as Advocate Agathiyan (uncredited)
- Visu in a special appearance as Beemarao, CID officer

== Production ==
Chidambara Rahasiyam is the first major acting credit of Arun Pandian and T. P. Gajendran.

== Soundtrack ==
The soundtrack was composed by Shankar–Ganesh.

Track listing
No.	Title	Lyrics	Singer(s)	Length
1.	"Malai Varugira Neram"	Idhayachandran	P. Jayachandran. Vani Jairam	5:1
2.	"Hello Dear Sir Welcome"	Muthulingam	S. G. Saagari, S. P. Sailaja	4:30
3.	"Chikkan Chikkan Doi"	Idhayachandran	P. Jayachandran, S. P. Sailaja	4:05
4.	"Devakottai Rasthavala"	Muthulingam	Malaysia Vasudevan, S. P. Sailaja	5:13
Total length:				19:01
