= Thirumathi Oru Vegumathi =

- Poster
- Directed by: Visu
- Written by: Visu
- Based on: Bharatha Matharkku Jai by Visu
- Produced by: Rajam Balachandar; Pushpa Kandaswamy
- Starring: Pandiyan; S. V. Sekhar; Nizhalgal Ravi; Kalpana; Visu
- Cinematography: N. Balakrishnan
- Edited by: Ganesh–Kumar
- Music by: Shankar–Ganesh
- Production company: Kavithalayaa Productions
- Release date: 26 January 1987
- Running time: 139 minutes
- Country: India
- Language: Tamil

Thirumathi Oru Vegumathi (transl. Mrs. is a reward) is a 1987 Indian Tamil-language drama film, written and directed by Visu and produced by Kavithalayaa Productions. It is based on Visu's play Bharatha Matharkku Jai. The film stars Pandiyan, S. V. Sekhar, Nizhalgal Ravi and Visu. It was released on 26 January 1987. The film was remade in Telugu as Srimathi Oka Bahumathi (1987), also directed by Visu, and in Kannada as Krishna Mechchida Radhe (1988).

== Plot ==
Uma works as a senior employee in a company. Namachivayam who works as a cashier in the same company falls in love with her. Uma tells him that she cannot marry as she has to take care of her two younger brothers who are still kids. Namachivayam convinces her by saying they shall not have any kids of their own, and that he'll take care of her brothers. He accepts to her demand to live in her house until her brothers grow up and do well for themselves, and she accepts to his demand that she shall not work any further and he will take care of the family. And they get married.

Ten years later, Uma's two younger brothers are now grown up. The elder of the two, Balaraman works in a government office. The younger of the two, Krishnan is a B.Sc. final year student, and a bit unruly in college, and always gets into the bad books of the college principal. Krishnan gets his friend Sankar married to Sankar's lover. After the girl's father complains to the police inspector, the police confront Krishnan and his friends, for conducting the illegal marriage of Sankar. Krishnan explains that the girl is not minor, but rather major, and hence legally eligible to marry. This incident and other such incidents earn the wrath of the college principal, against Krishnan. Nandhini is also a student in the same college, and she is from a wealthy background, and wants to go to America and settle down. Her father Naagarkoil Naadhamuni wishes to change her mind into staying in India.

Meanwhile, Rajeswari, a middle-class woman, living with her daughter Karpagam, receives an eviction notice to leave her house. They seek help at the government office where Balaraman works. Sathyamoorthy who works in the same office asks a bribe of three thousand rupees to Rajeswari, in order to delay the eviction case in court by a couple of years. But Rajeswari does not have the money. Finally on the day of eviction, Balaraman and his colleague go to her house with police to carry out the eviction orders from court. After they are evicted, Balaraman feels sorry for them, and asks them to stay in a nearby temple, and visits both mother and daughter regularly. He discovers that Rajeswari's illiterate husband (who died recently) was cheated by his three brothers into giving up all his wealth and property. He also falls in love with Karpagam, and they get married. Rajeswari also moves into Balaraman's house along with Karpagam. After marriage, Karpagam starts focussing more on wealth and money, and becomes greedy. Unbeknownst to anybody, Uma registers the house and property to her two brother's names, as she feels it's the right time. Uma also tells Namachivayam that she has been putting three hundred rupees in the bank every month on her brother's names as rent money, ever since the day she got married, so that in future if anybody in the family or society raise any unnecessary concerns, she will be able to show the rent money.

During college, two students Eve-tease a girl. Nandhini who sees this, slaps both of them. As the duo belong to Krishnan's gang, Krishnan confronts Nandhini to sort out a compromise. While Krishnan and Nandhini are arguing about this problem, Naadhamuni who witnesses the incident likes Krishnan's genuine and honest character. He decides to get him married to his daughter. He indirectly plays a game to achieve this. He complains against Krishnan to the college principal. Krishnan decides to take revenge and challenges both Naadhamuni and Nandhini that he will kiss Nandhini the next day. The next day morning, the whole college including all the students, the principal, Nandhini and Naadhamuni wait at the college entrance. The college principal promises Naadhamuni that there will be no problem. Some of the students are ready with a video camera to record the incident. Krishnan manages to come and kiss Nandhini in front of everybody. Naadhamuni takes the video tape of this incident, and goes to Krishnan's house and shows the video to his family. Uma asks Krishnan to marry Nandhini immediately, as it is considered sacrilegious for a boy to kiss a girl before marriage, as per Indian tradition. Krishnan and Nandhini get married on the same day, and Krishnan is also dismissed from college for kissing a girl on the college campus.

Nadhini, unhappy and angry, packs her bag and returns to her father's house the next day. When she arrives, Naadhamuni acts as if he is having an affair with the maidservant Aandaal, in order to irritate Nandhini and make her return. Nandhini falls for the trap, and returns to Krishnan's house. While Nandhini and Krishnan regularly fight at home, Balaraman tries to complain to government officials about Sathyamoorthy's corrupt practices. Sathyamoorthy decides to take revenge on Balaraman, by brainwashing Karpagam and Rajeswari, unbeknownst to Balaraman. Due to Karpagam's insistence, Balaraman hesitantly asks Uma about the documents she asked Balaraman and Krishnan to sign. Uma and Namachivayam are heart-broken and tell Balaraman that the documents are none other than the property transfer to Balaraman and Krishnan's names. Uma also gives the rent money accumulated over the last ten years, to her brothers. Balaraman feels ashamed and humbled. Krishnan decides not to use any of that money, as he respects his sister and her husband more. One day Krishnan decides to start a business, and Nandhini shows interest in helping him, and they slowly sort out their differences. Despite Nandhini coming from a wealthy background, they do not want to take Naadhamuni's help for the business.

Karpagam uses Balaraman's fifteen thousand rupees from the rent money given by Uma, to buy a plot of land duped and sold to her by Sathyamoorthy. Karpagam keeps asking for more money to build a house, to buy dresses and other lavish things, and a helpless and frustrated Balaraman finally decides to ask Sathyamoorthy for help. Sathyamoorthy gives him some bribe money that were collected on that day. Uma learns of this bribe money, and decides to confront Balaraman when he returns home. But Karpagam asks Uma and Namachivayam to leave the house, as the house is already registered on Balaraman and Krishnan's name. Uma and Namachivayam leave the house immediately with a broken heart. Rajeswari also leaves the house, after being disgusted with her daughter's behaviour. Krishnan and Nandhini, unaware of what has been happening, are out to buy a car, and surprise their whole family that day. On the same day, anti-corruption officers go to Balaraman's house to arrest him for possession of bribe money. He escapes, and while running, hides in Krishnan's new car's trunk, without knowing the car belongs to Krishnan. While Krishnan is driving home, he sees Uma and Namachivayam on the road. Uma suffers a heart attack owing to all the problems in her family, and dies on the road. Krishnan and Namachivayam take her body home. Balaraman gets out of the car's trunk, and realises he is outside his own house. When he enters the house and sees his sister dead, he starts crying. But the anti-corruption officers waiting there, arrest him. Karpagam realises her mistake, and decides to lock herself in her room as a punishment, for as long as Balaraman is imprisoned. The movie ends with Balaraman and Sathyamoorthy imprisoned.

== Cast ==
- Pandiyan as Krishnan
- S. V. Sekhar as Balaraman
- Nizhalgal Ravi as Namachivayam
- Visu as Naagarkoil Naadhamuni
- Kishmu as Sathyamoorthy
- Jayashree as Nandhini
- Kalpana as Uma
- Kokila Gobinathan as Karpagam
- M. N. Rajam as Rajeswari
- Bindu Ghosh as Aandaal, Naadhamuni's mainservant
- Omakuchi Narasimhan as corrupt government employee
- Sethu Vinayagam as College Principal
- M. S. Bhaskar as Eve-teasing student
- LIC Narasimhan as Police Inspector

== Production ==
Thirumathi Oru Vegumathi marked the cinematic acting debut of M. S. Bhaskar, who was previously a theatrical actor. It is the second Tamil film based on Visu's play Bharatha Matharkku Jai following Sadhurangam (1978).

== Soundtrack ==
The music was composed by Shankar–Ganesh and lyrics were written by Vairamuthu. The song "Paarthu Sirikithu Bommai" is set in Mayamalavagowla raga.

Track listing
No.	Title	Singer(s)	Length
1.	"Paarthu Sirikithu Bommai"	Vani Jairam	4:28
2.	"Aavadhum Pennale Manithan"	S. P. Balasubrahmanyam	4:28
3.	"Valarpirai Yenbadhum Theipirai"	K. J. Yesudas	3:39
4.	"Kattipudi Samy Dharisanam Kami"	K. S. Chithra	4:23
5.	"Akka Akka Nee Akka Ella"	S. P. Balasubrahmanyam	4:34
Total length:			21:32

== Reception ==
N. Krishnasamy wrote for The Indian Express, "Visu creates contrived situations, but as he unerringly brings to the fore qualities he wants his characters to show he gets away with them." Jayamanmadhan of Kalki noted the film's play-like feel, but called it another family-friendly film from Visu.
