= Chinna Mappilai =

1993 Indian film by Santhana Bharathi

- Theatrical release poster
- Directed by: Santhana Bharathi
- Screenplay by: Crazy Mohan; Santhana Bharathi
- Story by: P. Kalaimani
- Produced by: T. Siva
- Starring: Prabhu; Sukanya
- Cinematography: Ravishankar
- Edited by: G. Jayachandran
- Music by: Ilaiyaraaja
- Production company: Amma Creations
- Release date: 14 January 1993
- Country: India
- Language: Tamil

Chinna Mappilai (transl. Younger son-in-law) (Note: Spelt as Sinna Mapplai on the title card.) is a 1993 Indian Tamil-language romantic comedy film directed and co-written by Santhana Bharathi. The film, released on 14 January 1993, stars Prabhu and Sukanya, with Radha Ravi, Anand, Sivaranjani and Visu in supporting roles. It has been remade in Telugu, Kannada, and twice in Hindi.

== Plot ==
Thangavel is a bachelor working as a coolie in a bus stand. One day, he goes to look for a bride for himself at someone's house. There, he is insulted as a porter who works for small wages. On that day, with an upset face, he is at the bus stand where, unexpectedly, he meets the marriage broker Ambalavanan, who he had helped a few days earlier. They have a conversation in which Thangavel says everything about how was he insulted. At the same time, Ambalavan was also insulted by Aalavandhan (also known as Periya Pannai) for bringing a low status groom for his elder daughter (Janaki) at Periya pannai's house. In revenge, Ambalavanan intends to teach Aalavandhan a vital lesson about controlling his arrogance. Ambalavanan and Thangavel make a deal with each other to cheat Periya pannai. In this drama, Thangavel pretends to be a rich man and professional engineer from Singapore, who has returned and decided to check in on the planning of construction builds up in the Periya Pannai's village. He goes to the village to find out the site.

While he is on the way to the village, Thangavel luckily meets Janaki driving a bullock cart. He makes a bet with her to join in a race between his car and her cart. The race begins. At one stage, somewhere on his way, Thangavel's car breaks down, so Janaki takes an easy win. Upon meeting her, Thangavel falls in love with Janaki and plans to marry her, fulfilling his plan with Ambalavanan and his desires for social status and a bride. The marriage goes through as planned, and time passes.

One day, the Periya pannai comes to the city and gets off from the bus. Suddenly, he meets his son-in-law working at the bus stand and feels that he is being deceived by Thangavel. Later, he murmurs he will let his daughter know everything about what was happened in the bus stand. Then, when Thangavel comes back to the house, he is stopped by Janaki. He makes a new plan to tell his father-in-law that the person he met was his younger brother, Vairavel. All of them trust his words. Moreover, Periya pannai decides to let his second daughter marry him. He makes a plan without Ambalavanan's knowledge, then lets him know the details later on. What Thangavel and Ambalavanan do with these cheating plans carries forward to add interest to the remainder of the film.

== Cast ==
- Prabhu as Thangavel/ Vairavel
- Sukanya as Janaki
- Radha Ravi as Aalavandhan / Periya Pannai
- Anand as Vinod
- Sivaranjani as Mythili
- Visu as Ambalavanan
- Vinu Chakravarthy as Vinod's father
- Vennira Aadai Moorthy as an actor
- Mannangatti Subramaniam as Kanakkupillai
- Kavithalayaa Krishnan

== Soundtrack ==
The soundtrack was composed by Ilaiyaraaja. The song "Vennilavu Kothipathenna" is set in Madhyamavati raga, and "Kadhorum Lolakku" is set in Natabhairavi.

Song	Singer(s)	Lyricist
"Vaanam Vazhthida"	S. P. Balasubrahmanyam, S. Janaki	Vaali
"Vennilavu Kothipathenna"	Swarnalatha, Mano	Piraisoodan
"Kattu Kuyil Paatu"	Swarnalatha, Mano	Vaali
"Kadhorum Lolakku"	Mano, S. Janaki	Vaali
"Kanmanikkul Chinna"	S. P. Balasubrahmanyam, Minmini, Uma Ramanan	Vaali
"Ada Mama Nee"	Mano	Gangai Amaran

== Release and reception ==
Chinna Mappilai was released on 14 January 1993. The Indian Express wrote, "[Sinna Mapplai] is a hilarious, racy comedy of the Wodehousian sort with engaging situations, well directed by Santhana Bharathi." Kalki's critic advised not to ask about the story or logic but to put aside the old films that come to mind. The critic praised the comedy, adding that Prabhu, Visu, Radha Ravi and others would make the audience laugh for two hours. Crazy Mohan won Best Dialogue Writer for the film at the 14th Cinema Express Awards.

== Remakes ==
The film was remade in Telugu as Chinna Alludu (1993), in Kannada as Coolie Raja (1999), and twice in Hindi, directed by David Dhawan as Coolie No. 1 (1995 and 2020).

== Bibliography ==
- Sundararaman (2007) [2005]. Raga Chintamani: A Guide to Carnatic Ragas Through Tamil Film Music (2nd ed.). Pichhamal Chintamani. OCLC 295034757.
