= Urimai Oonjaladugiradhu =

1992 film directed by Visu

- Theatrical release poster
- Directed by: Visu
- Written by: Visu
- Produced by: A. Purnachandra Rao
- Starring: See Cast
- Cinematography: Balakrishnan
- Edited by: Ganesh Kumar
- Music by: Shankar–Ganesh
- Production company: Lakshmi Productions
- Release date: 14 August 1992
- Country: India
- Language: Tamil

Urimai Oonjaladugiradhu (transl. Rights are swinging) is a 1992 Indian Tamil-language drama film written and directed by Visu. He stars, alongside Ramesh Aravind, Major Sundarrajan, Kishmu, Kasthuri, Vadivukkarasi and Sangeetha. The film was released on 14 August 1992, and failed commercially.

== Plot ==
Shanmugam lives with his wife Vadivu and their three children – Uma, Mala and Narayanan. Shanmugam has great respect for his elder brother (Sundarrajan), a widower. A small flashback shows Sundarrajan's wife dying during childbirth. Sundarrajan decides to give his baby daughter to an orphanage as he thinks it is impossible to raise the child without her mother. But Shanmugam and Vadivu come to the rescue. They adopt Sundarrajan's baby and raise her as their eldest daughter. The child is none other than Uma. However, the elders decide to keep this as a secret not informing their children.

Gomathi is the younger sister of Sundarrajan and Shanmugam but is expelled from their home long back for marrying a man of her choice who happens to be Kamalanathan, a marriage broker. Meena is their only daughter. Kamalanathan is financially backward and the couple strive hard to meet their ends. Although the elders maintain enmity, Uma and Meena are good friends. Meena is employed in a beach resort but she also happens to be the concubine of the resort owner who is already married to a rich woman living in the US.

Uma also secures a job of receptionist in the same beach resort. James is the manager of the resort who is genuine and kind natured. Love blossoms between James and Uma. Hearing about this, Sundarrajan and Shanmugam get furious as they hate love marriages. But Uma stands firm in her decision of marrying James but only after getting the blessings of elders. Sundarrajan and Shanmugam decide to get the other two children married.

Mala is married to Sanjay but Shanmugam hides the truth about Uma to Mala's in-laws. Narayanan is in love with a girl and tactfully plays game by making it as an arranged marriage with the help of the girl's parents. On the day of marriage, Kamalanathan takes revenge on Sundarrajan and Shanmugam by disclosing about Uma's love affair to Mala's in-laws which makes them feel cheated. Also, he informs to Shanmugam about Narayanan's plan of making a love marriage into an arranged one. Kamalanathan feels happy for avenging his anger over Sundarrajan and Shanmugam.

The resort owner's wife learns of her husband's affair with Meena and fires her from job. She also orders her husband to return to the US. Now Meena is left helpless and adding on to it, her parents learn of her relationship with the resort owner. Meena also gets pregnant and the doctor advises that it is not safe to abort at this stage as it might result in Meena's death. Gomathi feels embarrassed and commits suicide. This makes Kamalanathan realise his mistake. He takes care of Meena at the same time, decides to solve the problems at Shanmugam's house created by him.

Mala returns to Shanmugam's house as her husband often suspects her virginity. Also, Narayanan has a quarrel with his wife and in-laws. Uma meets Mala's mother in-law and sorts out the problem. With the help of Meena, she helps Narayan to patch up with his wife. James discloses about his love to his parents for which they agree but on a condition that they should get married in two weeks-time. Uma patiently waits for Sundarrajan and Shanmugam's approval but they are stubborn. After two weeks, James comes to a register office with his parents expecting Uma to be there as well. Kamalanathan plans to meet Sundarrajan and Shanmugam and try to convince them. But Meena gets labour pain and is admitted in the hospital. Meena requests Kamalanathan to first help Uma for which he agrees.

Kamalanathan goes to Shanmugam's house and futilely tries all means to convince them. Finally, Kamalanathan reveals the truth to Uma, that she is actually the daughter of Sundarrajan but raised by Shanmugam which everyone thinks is a secret. Uma, to their surprise says that she knew the truth when she was in school itself with the help of Meena but she pretended not knowing it as she does not want her family elders to feel bad. Uma requests Sundarrajan and Shanmugam to agree for her wedding with James. Sundarrajan and Shanmugam agree and their wedding takes place. But Meena dies during childbirth. Uma decides to adopt Meena's baby and raise it as hers with James' approval.

== Cast ==
- Ramesh Aravind as James
- Major Sundarrajan as Shanmugam's brother
- Kishmu as Kamalanathan
- Vennira Aadai Moorthy
- Vivek as Narayanan
- Kutty Padmini as Lakshmi
- Ilavarasan as Shyam
- Kasthuri as Uma
- Vani as Meena
- Vandhana
- Vadivukkarasi as Vadivu
- Sangeetha as Gomathi
- Ramaprabha
- Visu as Shanmugam

== Production ==
Kasthuri considered her character to project her "real self".

== Soundtrack ==
The soundtrack was composed by Shankar–Ganesh. All lyrics were penned by Vairamuthu.

Track listing
No.	Title	Singer(s)	Length
1.	"Nootrakku Nooru"	S. P. Balasubrahmanyam, Swarnalatha	4:25
2.	"Pattimandram Pattimandram"	S. P. Balasubrahmanyam	4:22
3.	"Darishanam"	K. S. Chithra	5:37
4.	"Thennai Marathiley"	Vani Jairam	4:29
5.	"Urumai Oonjaladigiradu"	S. P. Balasubrahmanyam	4:34
Total length:			23:27

== Release and reception ==
Urimai Oonjaladugiradhu was released on 14 August 1992. On the same day, Ayyappa Prasad of The Indian Express called it "a well conceived family drama". He praised Visu's performance, direction and writing, along with the performances of Sundarrajan and Kishmoo while adding that Kasthuri "has not risen to the importance of the role". The film failed commercially.
