= Puyal Kadantha Bhoomi =

- Title card
- Directed by: Visu
- Written by: Visu
- Produced by: N. C. Hema Chakravarthy
- Starring: Karthik; Chandrasekhar; Anand Babu
- Cinematography: N. Balakrishnan
- Edited by: N. R. Kittu
- Music by: M. S. Viswanathan
- Production company: Vimal Enterprises
- Release date: 7 December 1984
- Country: India
- Language: Tamil

Puyal Kadantha Bhoomi (transl. The land that passed the storm) is a 1984 Indian Tamil-language action drama film written and directed by Visu. The film stars Karthik, Chandrasekhar, Anand Babu, Kishmu and Archana. The soundtrack was composed by M. S. Viswanathan. The film was released on 7 December 1984 and failed at the box-office.

== Plot ==
In Ayyanarpalayam, the village president, Namachivayam "Nammalu", is a respected figure who has donated his wealth to benefit the villagers and now leads a simple life, relying on the villagers for meals. The village is known for its discipline and low crime rate. Journalist Pattampoochi is impressed by the village's well-mannered residents and learns about its unique surroundings, nestled between the Western Ghats and River Bhavani, with coracles being the primary mode of transportation. Nammalu also shares information about Podiyan, a politically influential and arrogant individual who exploits the villagers. Podiyan controls the villagers' access to government services, buys their farm produce at cheap prices, and silences through violence anyone who dares to complain. Pattampoochi, who is determined to expose Podiyan's atrocities, is kidnapped and killed by Podiyan, who hypocritically offers to perform Pattampoochi's last rites. Nammalu vows to bring an end to Podiyan's reign of terror.

Meanwhile, three friends, Murali, Sekar, and Babu, arrive in Ayyanarpalayam with a vendetta against Nammalu, whom they believe was responsible for their past troubles. The villagers are outraged by the trio's disrespect towards Nammalu, but he intervenes, asking them to treat the youngsters with kindness and providing them with accommodations. It is revealed that 13 years ago, Nammalu had sent these troubled youngsters to a juvenile prison to reform them. Murali appears to be Nammalu's son. To conceal the truth about their imprisonment, Babu's mother, Chellammal, fabricated a story that the three boys were swept away by the river, and the villagers believe this fabricated tale. Podiyan manipulates the three friends by fueling their hatred towards Nammalu and using them to further his political ambitions. He funds them to create chaos in the village, but Nammalu confronts them, revealing their present family situations. Babu discovers his mother's blindness, while Sekar's niece, Uma, suffers at the hands of her stepmother.

Podiyan instructs the trio to distribute gallons of alcohol to the villagers, which they do, but the villagers, though unable to control their actions, refuse to buy the liquor. Valli, a coracle owner, burns her hand for transporting the trio, which sparks a soft spot in Murali's heart for her. Murali also burns his hand, showcasing his love for Valli. Despite their initial resolve to stay focused on their vendetta, the trio finds it challenging to remain emotionally detached, especially Babu and Sekar, who are moved by their family members' suffering. Murali brings Valli, Babu brings his mother, and Sekar his niece to their riverside accommodation, and Nammalu accepts Valli and Murali's relationship.

As elections approach, Podiyan seeks Nammalu's support, but Nammalu refuses, demanding that Podiyan construct a bridge across the river first. Enraged, Podiyan sends goons to loot the village. Unbeknownst to the attack, the three friends return the next day, and the villagers suspect them of being responsible for the loot, as they were absent from their accommodation the entire night. However, Nammalu protects the trio by lying to the police, claiming they were under his control the entire night. The village's respect for Nammalu crumbles when they discover he's lied to protect his son Murali, and Murali is shocked to see his father being refused meals, a stark contrast to his usual welcome. Now, Murali, Sekar, and Babu unite with Nammalu, determined to make things right. Nammalu tasks them with finding the real culprits behind the village's troubles and bringing them to justice.

The trio seeks the police inspector, Rameshbabu's help to apprehend Podiyan, but he turns out to be Podiyan's co-brother, foiling their plan. Podiyan captures the friends, but they escape with the help of an undercover police officer disguised as Podiyan's maid. The officer reveals that Nammalu's life is in danger and is subsequently shot and apprehended by Podiyan. Babu rushes to Ayyanarpalayam to protect Nammalu and sacrifices himself by taking a bullet meant for Nammalu. Babu's death enrages Murali and Sekar, who set out to kill Podiyan. Valli motivates them to work together, and they infiltrate Podiyan's bungalow, fighting off his goons and ultimately killing Podiyan and the corrupt police inspector.

When the police investigate the 14 murders at Podiyan's place, the village rallies around Murali and Sekar, but Nammalu reveals the truth about their involvement. The film concludes with the village bidding farewell to Murali and Sekar as the police take them away, their eyes fixed on Babu's burning corpse.

== Cast ==
- Karthik as Murali
- Chandrasekhar as Sekar
- Anand Babu as Babu
- Kishmu as Podiyan
- Archana as Valli
- Kamala Kamesh as Chellammal, Babu's mother
- Anuradha as a maid in Podiyan's house
- Kuladeivam Rajagopal as Pattampoochi, a journalist
- Sethu Vinayagam as Inspector Rameshbabu
- Typist Gopu as a constable
- Omakuchi Narasimhan as a constable
- Vairam Krishnamoorthy as an elderly villager
- Manager Cheena as a vaithiyar
- Samikannu as a politician
- T. K. S. Natarajan as Thalaiyari
- Visu as Namachivayam "Nammalu"
- T. P. Gajendran as a villager in the panchayat (uncredited)

== Production ==
The film was launched at AVM Studios in June 1984 along with song recording. Unlike the family dramas he was primarily known for, this was Visu's first attempt at directing an action film. The filming was held around Thirumullaivoyal near Chennai. Three fight sequences were shot at a village called Nellithurai near Mettupalayam for ten days. The filming ended with the picturisation of song "Chittoor Rani" with Anuradha which was shot at a bungalow at Adyar, Chennai.

== Soundtrack ==
The soundtrack was composed by M. S. Viswanathan.

Song	Singers	Lyrics
Aarambamugam	Rajkumar Bharathi, Vani Jairam	Idhayachandran
Naalam Kizhamaiyil	Malaysia Vasudevan, S. N. Surendar, Sasirekha, Ravichandran	Idhayachandran
Oothivittan	Malaysia Vasudevan, Vijayaramani, Soolamangalam Murali	Pulamaipithan
Malairaniye	K. J. Yesudas	Na. Kamarasan
Chittoor Rani	S. Janaki	Muthulingam

== Release and reception ==
The film was originally announced to be released in Diwali 1984, but was instead released on 7 December 1984. Jayamanmadhan of Kalki gave a review by only publishing a cartoon of Visu being a ringmaster to a lion. The film failed at the box-office.
