= Mella Thirandhathu Kadhavu =

1986 film by R. Sundarrajan

- Theatrical release poster
- Directed by: R. Sundarrajan
- Written by: R. Sundarrajan
- Produced by: M. Saravanan; M. Balasubramaniam
- Starring: Mohan; Radha; Amala
- Cinematography: Raja Rajan
- Edited by: R. Bhaskaran
- Music by: M. S. Viswanathan; Ilaiyaraaja
- Production company: AVM Productions
- Release date: 12 September 1986
- Country: India
- Language: Tamil

Mella Thirandhathu Kadhavu (transl. The door opened gently) is a 1986 Indian Tamil-language romantic musical film, written and directed by R. Sundarrajan, and produced by AVM Productions. The film, starring Mohan, Radha and Amala, was released on 12 September 1986 and became a commercial success.

The film's score and soundtrack were composed by M. S. Viswanathan and Ilaiyaraaja together as per the credits; however the song tunes were composed by Viswanathan and orchestra arrangements were by Ilaiyaraaja.

== Plot ==
Tulasi is a village girl. One day, she gets a letter from her cousin Subramani. She gets excited as they were close friends in childhood, but Subramani leaves with his family to the city. Subramani visits the village for his college thesis about folk songs. Tulasi is in love with Subramani, but is unsure if Subramani also loves her. Tulasi's father dies of a heart attack. When Subramani's father arranges a marriage for Subramani with Tulasi, he refuses. As a result, Tulasi's mother dies in frustration; Tulasi moves in to her uncle's house.

Later, a flashback comes in which Subramani is in love with Noorjahan, a student in his college. Since Noorjahan used to come to the college wearing a veil, Subramani has not seen her face. On a day when they plan to meet, Noorjahan accidentally steps into quicksand and dies. Subramani feels dejected after seeing Noorjahan's death and decides not to marry; that is the reason for him to avoid marrying Tulasi.

Tulasi decides to kill herself by stepping into the same quicksand where Noorjahan died as Subramani shows no interest in marrying her, but Subramani rushes in and saves Tulasi, having understood Tulasi's true love towards him.

== Cast ==
- Mohan as Subramani
- Radha as Tulasi
- Amala as Noorjahan
- Visu as Manickam Gounder
- Kamala Kamesh as Meenakshi
- Senthil as Manickam Gounder's auction assistant
- M. N. Nambiar as Noorjahan's father
- Charle as Subramani's friend
- Gundu Kalyanam as Subramani's friend
- Anu Mohan as Cook
- G. K. Venkatesh as Subramani's father

== Production ==
Mella Thirandhathu Kadhavu was Mohan's first film with AVM Productions. When AVM learned that M. S. Viswanathan was by 1986, having lesser films in hand, they decided to make this film and have him as composer along with Ilaiyaraaja. Viswanathan also agreed to compose the music alongside Ilaiyaraaja. Director R. Sundarrajan's usual cinematographer Raja Rajan and editor R. Bhaskaran reunited for this film too.

== Music ==
Except "Kuzhaloodhum Kannanukku", all the songs were composed by M. S. Viswanathan and the arrangements, orchestration and background score were done by Ilaiyaraaja. The song "Vaa Vennila" is inspired from another Viswanathan composition "Vaan Meedhile" from the 1953 film Chandirani. Ilaiyaraaja later used "Kuzhaloodum Kannanukku" in Hindi as "Baatein Hawa Hain Saare" for Cheeni Kum (2007). That song is set in Pahadi raga.

Track listing
No.	Title	Lyrics	Singer(s)	Length
1.	"Vaa Vennila"	Vaali	S. P. Balasubrahmanyam, S. Janaki	4:39
2.	"Thedum Kan Paarvai"	Vaali	S. P. Balasubrahmanyam, S. Janaki	4:43
3.	"Dil Dil Dil Manadhil"	Vaali	S. P. Balasubrahmanyam, P. Susheela	4:41
4.	"Kuzhaloodum Kannanukku"	Gangai Amaran	K. S. Chithra	4:38
5.	"Ooru Sanam Thonkidichu"	Gangai Amaran	S. Janaki	4:38
6.	"Sakkara Kattikku"	Gangai Amaran	K. S. Chithra, S. P. Sailaja, B.S Sasirekha	5:18
7.	"Vaa Vennila" (solo)	Vaali	S. Janaki	2:08
Total length:				30:45

== Release and reception ==
Mella Thirandhathu Kadhavu was released on 12 September 1986. Jayamanmadhan of Kalki criticised the film for feeling like two distinct stories divided by an interval. The film initially opened to average response but later picked up in coming weeks. When the film was released in Cinepriya Theatre, Madurai, a distributor released the film by reversing the two-halves of the film which enjoyed positive reception. Later all over Tamil Nadu the film was filmed by changing the two-halves of the film which shows Amala story in first half and Radha story in second half. The response prompted the producers to apply re-censorship for the film.

== Bibliography ==
- Saravanan, M. (2013) [2005]. AVM 60 Cinema (in Tamil) (3rd ed.). Rajarajan Pathippagam. OCLC 1158347612.
