= Sakalakala Sammanthi =

- Title card
- Directed by: Visu
- Screenplay by: Visu
- Based on: Yaar Kuzhandai by T. K. Manian
- Produced by: K. R. Gangadharan
- Starring: Delhi Ganesh; Manorama; Chandrasekhar; Aruna; Dilip; Madhuri; Pandiyan; Ranjini; Saranya; Visu
- Cinematography: N. Balakrishnan
- Edited by: Ganesh–Kumar
- Music by: Shankar–Ganesh
- Production company: KRG Movies International
- Release date: 6 July 1989
- Country: India
- Language: Tamil

Sakalakala Sammanthi (transl. Multi-talented daughter in-law) is a 1989 Indian Tamil-language comedy drama film written and directed by Visu, and produced by K. R. Gangadharan. It is based on the radio play Yaar Kuzhandai (transl. Whose child?) by T. K. Manian. The film, which focuses on the theme of widow remarriage, features an ensemble cast including Delhi Ganesh, Manorama, Chandrasekhar, Aruna, Dilip, Madhuri, Pandiyan, Ranjini, Saranya and Visu himself. It was released on 6 July 1989.

== Cast ==
- Delhi Ganesh as Dharmakartha
- Manorama as Lakshmi
- Chandrasekhar as Satyamurthy
- Aruna as Durga
- Dilip as Anand
- Madhuri as Saraswathy
- Pandiyan as Vasanthan
- Ranjini as Jhansi
- Saranya as Uma
- Laddu Papa
- Ilavarasan
- Kutty Padmini as Vellaiamma
- I. S. Murugesh as the bodybuilding trainer
- Visu as Malayappan

== Soundtrack ==
The music was composed by Shankar–Ganesh, with lyrics by Idhaya Chandran.

Track listing
No.	Title	Singer(s)	Length
1.	"Ungappan Peruennada"	Malaysia Vasudevan	5:06
2.	"Solladhe Yaarum Kettal Solladhe"	S. P. Balasubrahmanyam	4:55
3.	"Swarname Sorgame Vaa Vaa"	Vani Jairam	4:36
4.	"Aathoram Karupumaadu"	S. P. Sailaja	4:32
5.	"Solladhe Yaarum Kettal Solladhe"	Ganesh (Note: Credited as (Shankar) Ganesh.)	2:25
Total length:			21:34

== Release and reception ==
Sakalakala Sammanthi was released on 6 July 1989. P. S. S. of Kalki noted that Visu's skills were evident at every turn but questioned how long he could keep making the same kind of films.
