= Gundu Kalyanam =

Indian Actor

- Born: Lakshmi Narayanan Karuppaiah; 5 October 1963 (age 63); Madurai, Tamil Nadu, India
- Occupations: Actor, Politician
- Years active: 1980–2011; 2015-present
- Political party: AIADMK
- Spouse: Sreeshanthi
- Children: 1

Lakshmi Narayanan Karuppaiah, better knows as Gundu Kalyanam, is an Indian actor and director in Tamil film industry and active and hardcore member at AIADMK party. He entered cine field in the year 1967 and his first movie was Mazhalai Pattalam in 1979. He also had his hands on direction with the movie Nanga Pudusa and Nalla Nalla Pillaigalai Nambi. He also penned a patriotic song for the movie Nalla Nalla Pillaigalai Nambi and made a special screening of the song was held for former president Abdul Kalam. He is best known for his roles in Rajinikanth featuring movies. He has acted more than 750 movies in various languages.

== Early life ==
Gundu Kalyanam birth name is Lakshmi Narayanan. His father 'Gundu' Karuppaiah was an actor in the 1950s–1970s. He was an ardent supporter of AIADMK in the M.G.R period and also member of the party. Gundu Kalyanam, who received the nickname "Gundu" from his father. At the age of six, he was start to act in dramas. He has acted in several plays with his father Gundu Karuppaiah.

== Film career ==
He made his debut in the film 'Mazhalai Pattalam (1980) directed by actress Lakshmi under the supervision of K. Balachandar. He has played comedy roles in over 750 different language films such as Thillu Mullu, Pokiri Raja, Sivappu Malli, Mella Thirandhathu Kadhavu, Thoongathe Thambi Thoongathe, Kaavalan Avan Kovalan.

== Political career ==
During Jayalalithaa's tenure as General Secretary of the AIADMK, actor Gundu Kalyanam was the star spokesman for the party. During the election, he actively collected votes for candidates. In that case, the party split during Jayalalithaa's death. By then, he was on the T. T. V. Dhinakaran team. later he quit from T.T.V Dhinakaran team. At present he has joined O. Panneerselvam and Edappadi Palanisamy. After he joined the AIADMK, he was given the role of star talker. The AIADMK has officially declared this.

== Awards ==
- Kalaimamani Award - 2001

== Filmography ==
This list is incomplete; you can help by expanding it.

| Year | Film | Role | Notes |
|---|---|---|---|
| 1980 | Mazhalai Pattalam | | |
| 1980 | Avan Aval Adhu | | |
| 1981 | Thillu Mullu | | |
| 1981 | Sivappu Malli | | |
| 1981 | Pattam Parakkattum | | |
| 1982 | Pokkiri Raja | Liquor shop owner | |
| 1982 | Simla Special | | |
| 1983 | Mella Pesungal | | |
| 1983 | Oru Kai Parpom | | |
| 1983 | Dowry Kalyanam | Kalyanam | |
| 1983 | Anney Anney | | |
| 1983 | Thanga Magan | | |
| 1984 | Sirai | | |
| 1985 | Padikkadavan | | |
| 1985 | Ketti Melam | Mayandi | |
| 1986 | Mella Thirandhathu Kadhavu | | |
| 1986 | Naga Devatha | | Telugu film |
| 1987 | Kavalan Avan Kovalan | Chengalpattu Sengodan | |
| 1988 | Puthiya Vaanam | | |
| 1990 | Jagathalaprathapan | | |
| 1990 | Nalla Kaalam Porandaachu | | |
| 1991 | Pudhiya Raagam | | |
| 1991 | Vanakkam Vathiyare | | |
| 1991 | Archana IAS | | |
| 1991 | Idhayam | | |
| 1992 | Rickshaw Mama | Passenger | |
| 1992 | Solaiyamma | | |
| 1992 | David Uncle | | |
| 1993 | Maravan | | |
| 1993 | Alimayya | | Kannada film |
| 1993 | Rajadhi Raja Raja Kulothunga Raja Marthanda; Raja Gambeera Kathavaraya Krishna Kamarajan | | |
| 1995 | Murai Mappillai | | |
| 1995 | Mutthinantha Hendathi | | Kannada film |
| 1996 | Vetri Vinayagar | | |
| 1997 | Ratchagan | | |
| 2000 | Manasu | | |
| 2001 | Seerivarum Kaalai | | |
| 2010 | Nanga Pudusa | | Director also |
| 2011 | Nalla Nalla Pillaigalai Nambi | | |
| 2015 | Nathikal Nanaivathillai | | |
| 2023 | Baba Black Sheep | | |

Television

- Naam Iruvar Namakku Iruvar (2022; guest)
