= Kavalan Avan Kovalan =

- Theatrical release poster
- Directed by: Visu
- Screenplay by: Visu
- Produced by: K Rajagopal
- Starring: Prabhu; Rekha; Madhuri
- Cinematography: N. Balakrishnan
- Edited by: Ganesh–Kumar
- Music by: Vijay Anand
- Production company: KRG Movies International
- Release date: 29 May 1987
- Country: India
- Language: Tamil

Kavalan Avan Kovalan (transl. Kovalan is a guard) is a 1987 Indian Tamil-language film, both written and directed by Visu, starring Prabhu, Rekha and Madhuri. It was released on 29 May 1987.

== Plot ==
Chakravarthi, a renowned film director known for his socially responsible films, unknowingly has a doppelganger, Pachaiyappan, who frequently finds himself in trouble while fighting for justice in his village. He is in love with his cross-cousin, Anjalai. When Anjalai's parents begin searching for a suitable groom for her, Pachaiyappan intervenes to thwart their plans. However, Anjalai's parents set a condition: Pachaiyappan must secure a job, earn a decent income, and acquire at least an acre of land before they will consider his proposal. Pachaiyappan travels from Coimbatore to Madras to take on the challenge. Meanwhile, Chakravarthi's personal life is complicated, as his wife, Uma, a devout and orthodox woman, has taken a religious vow that keeps her distant from him. Chakravarthi, feeling neglected, begins an affair with Pappa, unaware that her sister is secretly photographing them to blackmail him.

In Madras, Pachaiyappan is mistaken for Chakravarthi, and people praise him for his films. However, this mistaken identity also puts him in danger when a group of bootleggers kidnap him, demanding a ransom from Uma, but Pachaiyappan cleverly escapes. Struggling to find employment, Pachaiyappan uses his resemblance to Chakravarthi to buy an expensive sari for Anjalai. The store owner takes photos with "Chakravarthi," eventually reaching the real director. Chakravarthi is shocked and visits the store to investigate, where he discovers pictures of his doppelganger. Uma, suspecting her husband's infidelity seeks her father's intervention. Uma's father decides to stay with Chakravarthi to monitor his activities. Meanwhile, Pappa's sister mistakes Pachaiyappan for Chakravarthi and inquires about his recent absence. Realizing Chakravarthi's secret affair, Pachaiyappan decides to reform him and challenges him to end his immoral relationship.

Chakravarthi, however, tries to evade confrontation by drugging his father-in-law with sleeping pills and sneaking out to meet Pappa, his mistress. At a dance program where Chakravarthi is the chief guest, Pachaiyappan cleverly arranges seating to expose Chakravarthi's affair, putting him in an awkward position. Frustrated with Pachaiyappan's carefree nature, Anjalai arrives in Madras to check on him, who has been struggling to earn a living and threatens to reveal his impersonation drama to Chakravarthi. To prevent this, Pachaiyappan sneaks into Chakravarthi's film location, where Anjalai mistakes him for Chakravarthi and expresses her concerns. However, Pachaiyappan leaves, and Anjalai ends up arguing with the real Chakravarthi, thinking he is her fiancé. As Chakravarthi and Pachaiyappan continue to give conflicting instructions, Chakravarthi's family and coworkers begin to suspect that he is developing mental instability. Pachaiyappan, frustrated with Chakravarthi's unchanged behavior, decides to counsel Pappa. Unbeknownst to him, Anjalai has started working as a house help at Pappa's residence. Pachaiyappan disguised as Chakravarthi enters the house where Pappa's sister subject Pachaiyappan to the heated rod treatment, to bind Chakravarthi to Pappa, thinking he is Chakravarthi.

Anjalai witnesses the incident and leaves her job upon realizing Pappa's family's intentions to ruin Chakravarthi's life with Uma. When she discovers the scar on Pachaiyappan's thigh, she breaks up with him, suspecting he might have misbehaved with Pappa. Heartbroken, Pachaiyappan calls Chakravarthi, but his father-in-law answers, impersonating Chakravarthi. This leads to a meeting between Chakravarthi, Pachaiyappan, and Uma's father. Chakravarthi is shocked to see his lookalike, and Uma's father decides to resolve their problems. He meets Pappa's sister, offering to pay her to leave Chakravarthi alone, where she demands ₹25 lakhs. Uma's father reveals the truth about Pachaiyappan's impersonation, and Pappa's sister agrees to destroy the compromising photos for ₹50,000. Pappa, who genuinely loved Chakravarthi, pleads with Uma's father not to pay, as her intentions were pure. To prevent Chakravarthi from seeking fulfillment outside their home, Uma's father advises Uma to nurture a more joyful intimacy with him and emphasizes that the essence of marriage holds greater importance than merely embodying a devout and traditional approach.

To quell Anjalai's anger towards Pachaiyappan, Uma's father brings him to his hometown, where Anjalai's wedding is on the horizon. She hesitates to marry Pachaiyappan, suspecting that he may have had a past with Pappa. The scar from a heated rod on Pachaiyappan's body serves as a crucial piece of evidence. So, Chakravarthi, pretends to be Pachaiyappan and reveals his scarless thigh. With their concerns alleviated, the villagers urge Anjalai to accept Pachaiyappan as her husband. Though Anjalai is uncertain, she believes Uma's father's assurance that the scar she saw was on Chakravarthi's legs. Consequently, Uma marries Pachaiyappan, and on their wedding night, Anjalai notices the scar on Pachaiyappan's thigh and affectionately chides him for not being honest with her.

== Cast ==
- Prabhu as Chakravarthi and Pachaiyappan
- Rekha as Uma
- Madhuri as Anjalai
- Prameela as Pappa's sister
- Kalaranjini as Pappa
- Visu as Chakravarthi's father-in-law
- Oru Viral Krishna Rao as Kaatangulathur Kathadi
- Loose Mohan as a hotel waiter
- Omakuchi Narasimhan as Aminjikarai Ammavasai
- Gundu Kalyanam as Chengalpattu Sengodan
- Master Haja Sheriff as a cloth store employee
- Sethu Vinayagam as Sethu, cinematographer
- S Narasimhan as Narasimhan, Chakravarthi's assistant director
- Thayir Vadai Desikan as a priest
- M. S. Bhaskar as a villager
- T. P. Gajendran as a panchayat board member (uncredited)

Additionally, Karthik, Jayashree, Kishmu, Manorama, Raghuvaran, Y. G. Mahendran, Sivachandran, G. Srinivasan, Delhi Ganesh, Lalitha Sharma, Shari, Disco Shanti, Kavithalayam Natarajan, and Puliyur Saroja appear as themselves.

== Soundtrack ==
The soundtrack was composed by Vijay Anand, with lyrics written by Vaali.

Track listing
No.	Title	Singer(s)	Length
1.	"Nizhaledhu"	Malaysia Vasudevan, M. Jayachandran
2.	"Uravugal Oru"	S. P. Balasubrahmanyam
3.	"Chittang Chittang"	S. Janaki
4.	"Oruvanukku Oruthi"	Vani Jairam, K. S. Chithra
5.	"Pothum Pothum"	Malaysia Vasudevan

== Critical reception ==
The Indian Express wrote, "It is Prabhu who must be singled out for honours", also appreciating Vijay Anand's music and Balakrishnan's cinematography. Jayamanmadhan of Kalki compared the film unfavourably to Visu's earlier films.
