= Nerariyum Nerathu =

- Directed by: Salaam Chembazhanthy
- Written by: Ezhacheri Ramachandran (Story); Pappanamkodu Lakshmanan (Screenplay)
- Produced by: CG Bhaskaran for Sahrudaya Chithra
- Starring: Prem Nazir; Shankar; Ratheesh; T. G. Ravi; Unnimary; Rohini
- Cinematography: VC Sasi S.I.C.A.
- Edited by: K Sankunni
- Music by: Johnson
- Release date: 13 June 1985
- Country: India
- Language: Malayalam

Nerariyum Nerathu is a 1985 Indian Malayalam-language film directed by Salaam Chembazhanthy for Sahrudaya Chithra starring Prem Nazir, Shankar and Ratheesh, supported by T. G. Ravi, Unnimary and Rohini playing other important roles.

== Cast ==
- Prem Nazir as Rajan
- Shankar as Rajeev
- Ratheesh as SI Mohan
- T. G. Ravi as Keshavankutty
- Unnimary as Thankamani
- Rohini as Rathi
- Jagathy Sreekumar as Kuttappan Bhagavathar/Kanishta Raja
- Kuthiravattam Pappu as Phalgunan
- Bindu Ghosh as Savithri
- Lalithasree as Vimala Menon
- Anuradha as Dancer
- C. I. Paul as Sadanandan
- Adoor Bhasi as Bhaskara Kurup
- Bahadoor as Gopala Pilla Master
- Madhuri as Sharada

== Soundtrack ==
The music was composed by Johnson and the lyrics were written by Ezhacheri Ramachandran.

No.	Song	Singers	Lyrics	Length (m:ss)
1	"Orupaadu Swapnangal"	K. J. Yesudas, S. Janaki	Ezhacheri Ramachandran	
2	"Panchaara Panchaayathil"	C. O. Anto, Krishnachandran	Ezhacheri Ramachandran	
3	"Premakala Devathamarude"	S. Janaki	Ezhacheri Ramachandran	
