= G. Srinivasan (actor) =

Tamil actor

- Born: 1930
- Died: 2025 (aged 94–95)
- Occupations: Actor, writer, director
- Years active: 1975–2011
- Notable work: Kizhakke Pogum Rail, Puthiya Vaarpugal, Kanni Paruvathile, Ranuva Veeran, Idaya Kovil
- Spouse: Puliyur Saroja
- Children: 1

G. Srinivasan was an Indian actor, writer, director who predominantly appeared in Tamil language films. He was a supporting and villain actor during the 1970s and 1980s. He acted over 200 films in Tamil, Telugu, Malayalam. He made his debut as the lead villain in Bharathiraja's Puthiya Vaarpugal (1979). His wife Choreographer Puliyur Saroja was a popular choreographer from the 1970s to the 1990s. They have their own educational institutions.

== Film career ==
He had written eight films and directed three films. He started as an assistant to Adurthi Subba Rao and have worked as an associate to various other directors such as Dada Mirasi and K. Viswanath. He has played villain roles and character roles in over a hundred films, including the Ranuva Veeran in Tamil and the Penmani Aval Kanmani. He has also acted in Malayalam and Telugu.

== Family ==
He married choreographer Puliyur Saroja. Their only son died in a road accident a few years ago.

== Arrest ==
Saroja and Srinivasan run a school called Sathya Matriculation School in Ramamavaram area. Swadhirajan, a 5-year-old boy, collapsed and died in a waste water tank at the school. The police registered the case and investigated. Subsequently, the school founder, actor Srinivasan, was arrested by the police for allegedly negligently shutting down the waste water tank.

== Filmography ==
This is a partial filmography. You can expand it.

=== 1970s ===
Year	Film	Role	Notes
1975	Aval Oru Kaviyam		Debut movie
1978	Kizhakke Pogum Rail	Maruthu	
1978	Sigappu Rojakkal		
1979	Puthiya Vaarpugal	Landlord	
1979	Thisai Maariya Paravaigal		
1979	Kanni Paruvathile		
1979	Enippadigal		
1979	Nallathoru Kudumbam		

=== 1980s ===
Year	Film	Role	Notes
1980	Poottaatha Poottukkal		
1980	Murattu Kaalai		
1981	Sattam Oru Iruttarai		
1981	Ranuva Veeran		
1981	Kadal Meengal		
1981	Velichathukku Vanga		
1981	Kilinjalgal		
1982	Vazhvey Maayam		
1982	Paritchaikku Neramaachu		
1983	Vellai Roja		
1983	Dhooram Adhighamillai		
1984	Vaai Sollil Veeranadi		
1984	Madras Vathiyar		
1984	Pozhuthu Vidinchachu		
1985	Padikkadha Pannaiyar		
1985	Sri Raghavendrar		
1985	Idaya Kovil		
1985	Yaar?		
1985	Chidambara Rahasiyam		
1987	Ival Oru Thodar Kathai		
1987	Idhu Oru Thodar Kathai		
1987	Manithan		
1987	Kavalan Avan Kovalan	Himself	Guest appearance
1988	Penmani Aval Kanmani		
1988	Paarthal Pasu		
1989	Rajadhi Raja		
1989	Urimai Geetham		
1989	Enne Petha Raasa	Natarajan	

=== 1990s ===
Year	Film	Role	Notes
1990	Raja Enga Raja		
1991	Pudhiya Raagam		
1992	Kaaval Geetham		

=== 2000s and later ===
Year	Film	Role	Notes
2005	Ayya	Rangasamy	
2010	Nagaram	Kadhar Bhai	
2011	Venghai	Radhika's grandfather	Last movie
