= Ketti Melam =

- Title card
- Directed by: Visu
- Written by: Visu
- Produced by: T. R. Srinivasan
- Starring: Karthik; Sulakshana
- Cinematography: N. Balakrishnan
- Edited by: Ganesh–Kumar
- Music by: Ilaiyaraaja
- Production company: Charuchitra Films
- Release date: 11 October 1985
- Country: India
- Language: Tamil

Ketti Melam (pronounced [keʈʈimeːɭam] transl. Wedding drumrolls) is a 1985 Indian Tamil-language film written and directed by Visu. The film stars Karthik and Sulakshana. It was released on 11 October 1985, and failed commercially.

== Plot ==
Uma returns to Rose Island after eight years of education in London to meet her wealthy paternal uncle, Chinna Sethupathi, and his wife, who hail from a royal lineage. However, their driver, Vasu, soon realises that the woman claiming to be Uma is an impostor, as the real Uma has a distinctive burn scar on her shoulder. He confides in his father, Ramaiyya, about his suspicions. In reality, Chinna Sethupathi is a womaniser, and the imposter is his mistress. To keep up the charade, Chinna Sethupathi and his driver, Kabali, murder Ramaiyya, a crime witnessed by Chinna Sethupathi's wife. Vasu is beaten and thrown into the ocean.

Also, Chinna Sethupathi has apprehended his elder brother, Periya Sethupathi, and locked him in a slum under Marappa Devar's care. Periya Sethupathi's wife is locked up in Madras under Shakunthala's care, and their younger daughter, Rama, is hidden in Srirangam under Muniyandi's care. Chinna Sethupathi deceives the people of Rose Island estate, claiming that his brother's family is enjoying time in Shimla. However, the real Uma has arrived in India and escapes from Chinna Sethupathi's men to complain about her missing parents and sister to the police, and Inspector Victor Solomon is assigned to the investigation. A fisherman rescues Vasu, and his daughter Ponni takes care of him. Ponni harbours a one-sided love for Vasu, nursing him back to health.

In Srirangam, Paappa, the editor of a monthly magazine, and her husband Chinna Paiyan, a fiction writer, receive a letter from 8-year-old Rama, seeking help to escape from her house arrest. They pose as donation seekers to gather information about Rama and her family. Meanwhile, three duos are formed: Uma and Victor Solomon, Vasu and Ponni, and Chinna Paiyan and Paappa. Each duo is unaware of the other's existence and infiltrates Chinna Sethupathi's palace under pretenses as a doctor and a nurse. Paappa loses her handbag, which Ponni finds. Vasu, Uma, Ponni, and Victor Solomon meet at a restaurant, and after Vasu identifies Uma using the wound on her shoulder, they unite to find Uma's missing parents and Vasu's father. Using Paappa's handbag, they track down Chinna Paiyan and Paappa in Srirangam. Meanwhile, Chinna Paiyan and Paappa investigate using petrol pump receipts in Madras, posing as police officers. However, their ruse is discovered, and they are chased by a goon named Mayandi, and Chinna Paiyan and Paappa get separated while escaping.

To escape Mayandi, Paappa coincidentally sneaks into Shakunthala's house and gets locked in, where Uma's mother is being held captive. Chinna Paiyan searches for Paappa and returns to Srirangam. Vasu, Uma, Ponni, and Victor Solomon meet Chinna Paiyan and ally. Together, they rescue Rama from Muniyandi and then head to Madras to find Uma's mother. Uma sings a family song, but her mother, who is mentally disturbed, doesn't respond. Chinna Paiyan sings a song, and Paappa responds, allowing them to locate Uma's mother. After an intense door-to-door search, they rescue Paappa and Uma's mother. Disguising themselves as African tourists, Chinna Paiyan, Vasu, Uma, and Paappa infiltrate Rose Island. Uma secretly meets her aunt, who reveals that her father might be held captive in Madurai. Chinna Sethupathi arrives, but remains unsuspecting. Chinna Paiyan exploits Chinna Sethupathi's weakness for women, extracting the address where Uma's father is being held from Kabali.

Meanwhile, Vasu's romance with Chinna Sethupathi's mistress sparks Uma's possessiveness, making her confess her love for Vasu, and Vasu also accepts. However, Chinna Sethupathi discovers that Kabali inadvertently revealed the location of Periya Sethupathi's hideout and, suspecting his wife's involvement, kills her. Victor Solomon, Vasu, and Chinna Paiyan rescue Uma's father from Marappa Devar's custody in Kaakkathoppu, Madurai. With Uma's family reunited, they are safely taken to Pavalatheevu, where Uma's mother's mental health recovers after seeing her husband. Ponni silently lets go of her feelings for Vasu, realising he loves Uma. As Chinna Sethupathi learns the truth, he kidnaps Uma, prompting Vasu to rush to her rescue. After an intense riverboat fight, Vasu overpowers Chinna Sethupathi, while Victor Solomon apprehends Kabali.

Chinna Sethupathi and Kabali are sentenced to death, while Shakunthala, Marappa Devar, and Muniyandi receive 7-year prison sentences. Vasu and Uma marry.

== Cast ==
- Karthik as Vasu
- Ravichandran as Chinna Sethupathi
- Kishmu as Victor Solomon, Crime Inspector
- Sulakshana as Uma
- Manorama as Paappa
- Disco Shanti as Chinna Sethupathi's mistress
- Radha Ravi as Muniyandi
- Sivachandran as Marappa Devar
- C. L. Anandan as Kabali
- Delhi Ganesh as Periya Sethupathi
- Prameela as Shakunthala
- Pandari Bai as Periya Sethupathi's wife
- Vadivukkarasi as Chinna Sethupathi's wife
- Omakuchi Narasimhan as Dr. Gundappa
- Gundu Kalyanam as Mayandi
- Sethu Vinayagam as a police officer
- Thayirvadai Desigan as a petrolpump manager
- Visu as Chinna Paiyan
- T. P. Gajendran as Dr. Ottakoothar (uncredited role)

== Production ==
The film was launched at Prasad Studios along with song recording in December 1984.

== Soundtrack ==
The music was composed by Ilaiyaraaja.

Title	Singer(s)	Lyrics	Length
"Amma Nee"	Uma Ramanan	Vaali	04:39
"Kandangi Selai"	S. P. Sailaja	Alangudi Somu	04:04
"Thaagame Undaanathe"	K. J. Yesudas, Uma Ramanan	Idhaya Chandran	04:19
"Thottukko Pattukko"	Malaysia Vasudevan, Manjula	Idhaya Chandran	04:46
"Vaa Vaa Vaa"	Krishnamoorthy, B. S. Sasirekha	Vaali	01:21
"Vaasam Veesuthe"	S. P. Sailaja	Ponnaruvi	04:02

== Critical reception ==
Kalki praised Ravichandran's performance while calling Visu's humour as okay and concluded there is laughter here, there is tears, there is fight, there are listenable songs.
