= Rajathanthiram (1984 film) =

- Title card
- Directed by: Visu
- Written by: Visu
- Produced by: K. Gopinathan
- Starring: Karthik; Sulakshana
- Cinematography: N. Balakrishnan
- Edited by: N. R. Kittu
- Music by: M. S. Viswanathan
- Production company: Bagavathi Creations
- Release date: 27 April 1984
- Country: India
- Language: Tamil

Rajathanthiram (/rɑːdʒəθənðirəm/ transl. Strategic diplomacy) is a 1984 Indian Tamil-language film written and directed by Visu. The film stars Karthik and Sulakshana, with Radha Ravi, Kishmu, Sivachandran, Prameela, Rani Padmini and Anuradha in supporting roles. It was released on 27 April 1984.

== Plot ==
In Ooty, a kind and wealthy landlady, Sathyavathi, resides in a grand property with her stepson, Ilaiya Boopathy, who is an irresponsible and arrogant young man. Sathyavathi's soft-hearted nature is a facade, as she has been cruelly manipulating and torturing Boopathy, with the help of her manager. Sathyavathi's true intentions are to usurp Boopathy's ancestral properties, which are currently under her control. She has been drugging Boopathy for 13 years, rendering him weak and submissive. She plans to wait until Boopathy gets married and has a child, allowing her to force Boopathy to transfer the properties to her.

Meanwhile, a wanderer arrives in Ooty and becomes suspicious of Sathyavathi's noble facade. Upon discovering Boopathy's plight, the wanderer secretly communicates with him, vowing to expose Sathyavathi's true nature. The wanderer stays in the village, gathering information about Sathyavathi and Boopathy. He discovers that Sathyavathi was once a laborer on the estate, and the gardener, Kozhanthaisamy "Kozhanthai", is imprisoned for murdering Boopathy's parents. The wanderer meets Kozhanthai in prison and shows him a photograph, prompting Kozhanthai to reveal the truth.

Sathyavathi had lured Viswanatha Boopathy, Ilaiya Boopathy's father, and manipulated him into transferring the properties to her name. When Viswanatha Boopathy and his wife, Santhi Nachiyar, discovered her plan, they cleverly transferred the properties to their son, Ilaiya Boopathy, with conditions. Enraged, Sathyavathi killed Viswanatha Boopathy and Santhi Nachiyar, framing Kozhanthai, who was wrongfully convicted, while Ilaiya Boopathy was left believing Kozhanthai was the murderer. The wanderer, Uma, and Japaan team up to rescue Ilaiya Boopathy from Sathyavathi's clutches. They kidnap Ilaiya Boopathy, nurse him back to health, and train him in self-defense. After meeting Kozhanthai in prison, they are all reunited, and Kozhanthai is eventually released.

Uma falls in love with Ilaiya Boopathy, and together they plan to take down Sathyavathi. They devise a scheme, starting with a fake kidnapping and ransom demand. Sathyavathi pays the ransom, unaware of the group's true intentions. Next, Japaan infiltrates Sathyavathi's household, pretending to be a wealthy suitor for Maya's hand. Meanwhile, Sathyavathi discovers Uma and, believing she is an orphan, decides to use her as a pawn to marry Ilaiya Boopathy. Uma agrees to the plan, and Kozhanthai poses as Japaan's father to further their scheme.

Bhairavan, the wanderer, reveals his true identity and his past connection to Sathyavathi. Sathyavathi was his wife, and he had caught her with another man and tried to confront her, but she escaped. Now, he is seeking revenge. Bhairavan had joined forces with Ilaiya Boopathy, Japaan, Uma, and Kozhanthai to take down Sathyavathi. However, she is one step ahead and traps them. Sathyavathi reveals her plan to marry Ilaiya Boopathy to a fake wife and transfer the properties to her name. Bhairavan arrives, threatening to expose Sathyavathi's secrets. She cracks under pressure and reveals the location of her captives. Bhairavan and Ilaiya Boopathy rescue Japaan, Uma, and Kozhanthai. Bhairavan confronts Sathyavathi, symbolically tying the thaali back on her neck before killing her for her betrayals.

== Cast ==
- Karthik as Ilaiya Boopathy
- Sulakshana as Uma
- Radha Ravi as Japaan
- Kishmu as Kozhanthaisamy "Kozhanthai"
- Sivachandran as a manager
- Prameela as Sathyavathi
- Anuradha
- Rani Padmini as Maya
- Sethu Vinayagam as Viswanatha Boopathy
- Typist Gopu as a waiter
- Omakuchi Narasimhan as a person in the temple
- Vairam Krishnamoorthy as a judge
- Visu as Bhairavan

== Soundtrack ==
The music was composed by M. S. Viswanathan.

Track listing
No.	Title	Lyrics	Singer(s)	Length
1.	"Ettuthikkum"	Muthulingam	S. P. Balasubrahmanyam
2.	"Dheem Thanananom"	Idhaya Chandran	Vani Jairam
3.	"Pudichaalum"	Pulamaipithan	S. Janaki, Malaysia Vasudevan
4.	"Aattam Poduthu"	Idhaya Chandran	S. Janaki

== Critical reception ==
Jayamanmadhan of Kalki praised the acting of Karthik, Prameela and Visu but panned Sulakshana's acting, the stunts and dance choreography. Balumani of Anna praised the acting, cinematography, stunt and dance choreography and direction.
