= Kishmu =

Indian film actor

- Born: Meenakshisundaram Ramasamy Krishnamurthy; 1947; Tamil Nadu
- Died: 10 November 1994 (age 46); Tamil Nadu
- Occupations: Actor, Writer
- Years active: 1982–1992
- Spouse: Savithri
- Children: 1
- Relatives: Visu

Meenakshisundaram Ramasamy Krishnamurthy, better known as Kishmu, was an Indian film and stage actor. He is also brother of famous actor and director Visu. Kishmu made his debut in the Visu-directed film Manal Kayiru in 1982. Other notable film appearances include Dowry Kalyanam, Chidambara Rahasiyam, Samsaram Adhu Minsaaram, Thirumathi Oru Vegumathi, Vedikkai En Vadikkai, Nanayam Illatha Nanayam, Kavalan Avan Kovalan, and Varavu Nalla Uravu.

== Career ==
Prior to his career in theatre, Kishmu worked as an electrical foreman at TVS in Padi, Chennai. He began acting with his brother, Visu. Kishmu made his acting debut in the second film directed by Visu, Manal Kayiru (1982), which received critical and commercial acclaim. In 1985, Kishmu acted in Aval Sumangalithan, and in 1986 appeared in Samsaram Adhu Minsaram and Oomai Vizhigal, which both achieved success. In his early acting career, Kishmu acted only in his brother's films, but eventually went on to act in others, performing in around 25 films from 1982 to 1992.

== Personal life ==
He married Savithri and had a daughter Viveka after being childless for seventeen years. Kishmu died on 10 November 1994 when Viveka was one year old and his brother-in-law Kuriakose Ranga helped arrange her marriage with Vinod.

== Filmography ==
Year	Film	Role	Notes
1982	Manal Kayiru	Kamalakannan	
1982	Kanmani Poonga	Rajagopal	
1983	Dowry Kalyanam	Raja Kalavai	
1983	Naalu Perukku Nandri		
1984	Rajathanthiram	Kozhanthaisamy	
1984	Vaai Sollil Veeranadi		
1984	Naanayam Illatha Naanayam	K. R. Aandavar	
1984	Puyal Kadantha Bhoomi	Podiyan	
1985	Ketti Melam	Victor Solomon	
1985	Chidambara Rahasiyam	Kattamuthu Chettiyar	
1985	Aval Sumangalithan	Dr. Karuna Moorthy	
1986	Samsaram Adhu Minsaram	Albert Fernandes	
1986	Oomai Vizhigal	Kothandaraman	
1987	Kavalan Avan Kovalan	Himself	Guest appearance
1987	Thirumathi Oru Vegumathi	Sathyamoorthy	
1987	Ore Raththam	the rigid religionist	
1987	Srimathi Oka Bahumathi		Telugu film
1988	Oorai Therinjikitten	Ice mama	
1988	Penmani Aval Kanmani	Vadivu's Husband	
1988	Thaimel Aanai	Chakkara	
1988	Mappillai Sir	Colonel	
1988	Aadade Aadharam		Telugu film
1990	Varavu Nalla Uravu	Chandrasekar	
1990	Vedikkai En Vadikkai	Matrubhootham	
1992	Urimai Oonjaladugiradhu	Kamalanathan	
