= Visu =

Indian screenwriter and film director (1945–2020)

- Born: Meenakshisundaram Ramasamy Viswanathan; 1 July 1945; Kalakkad, Tamil Nadu, India
- Died: 22 March 2020 (aged 74); Chennai, India
- Occupations: Film director, Screenwriter, Actor, Television host.
- Years active: 1977–2019
- Spouse: Sundari
- Children: 3

Meenakshisundaram Ramasamy Viswanathan (1 July 1945 – 22 March 2020), best known by his stage name Visu, was an Indian screenwriter, film director, stage, film and television actor and talk-show host known for his work in Tamil theatre and film. Visu initially worked as an assistant to director K. Balachander until becoming a director himself. He later began acting, with his first notable film being Kudumbam Oru Kadambam (1981), directed by S. P. Muthuraman.

== Career ==
Visu started his career as a theatre artist, working with Y. G. Parthasarathy's troupe. He was writing scripts for stage dramas before getting into the film industry as an assistant to director K. Balachander. During his time with Balachander, he wrote screenplays for numerous films including Pattina Pravesam (1977), Avan Aval Adhu (1980), Thillu Mullu (1981) and Netrikkan (1981). Thillu Mullu and Netrikkan, which were both released in 1981, became box office hits for actor Rajinikanth. Visu made his debut as a character actor in the film Kudumbam Oru Kadambam (1981), for which he also wrote the screenplay. The film was directed by S. P. Muthuraman.

His first film as a director was Manal Kayiru (1982). Most of his films including Manal Kayiru, Dowry Kalyanam (1983), Samsaram Adhu Minsaram (1986), Thirumathi Oru Vegumathi (1987), Penmani Aval Kanmani (1988), Vedikkai En Vadikkai (1990) and Pattukottai Periyappa (1994) spoke about the issues of urban middle-class families. These films, which were released in the mid-80s, turned out to be crowd pullers, particularly with regard to the female audience. His other super hit was Chidambara Rahasiyam (1985), which is considered a cult-classic.

While he has directed a rage of actors on screen, he and his brother Kishmu used to star in many of his films apart from Manorama and his brother-in-law Kuriakose Ranga. His film Neenga Nalla Irukkanum won the National Film Award for Best Film on Other Social Issues in 1992. Based on prohibition, the film was the last onscreen appearance of then Tamil Nadu chief minister, J. Jayalalithaa.

He has also shared the screen with Rajinikanth in Nallavanukku Nallavan (1984), Mr. Bharath (1986), Mannan (1992), Uzhaippali (1993) and Arunachalam (1997).

During the ending phase of his career, he made movies which did not leave a lasting mark on the audience as Vaa Magale Vaa (1994), Meendum Savithri (1996) and Sigamani Ramamani (2001).

Actor and stage artiste S. Ve. Shekher, who worked in over 20 films with Visu, called him extremely disciplined and committed.

As an actor, he was last seen in Manal Kayiru 2 (2016), the sequel to one of his earliest directorial successes, Manal Kayiru.

He is known to have starred in over 60 films and directed around 25 films.

Visu later became known for hosting live debates on television, namely Arattai Arangam on Sun TV and Visuvin Makkal Arangam on Jaya TV.

== Style ==
"Growing up in a joint family, I observed how each person had a difference of opinion. It wasn't bad; just that we were different. I wondered, 'Wouldn't other joint families have similar issues?' So I started writing scripts that reflect the day-to-day scenario in a joint family".

— Visu in 2016

In most of the films Visu wrote or directed, all the characters were given equal importance. Often, the plot included a huge house where a joint family would reside and the character of Visu would solve their problems. Many of Visu's film titles contain rhyming words, such as Kudumbam Oru Kadambam, Samsaram Adhu Minsaram, Thirumathi Oru Vegumathi, Kavalan Avan Kovalan, Penmani Aval Kanmani, Varavu Nalla Uravu and Vedikkai En Vadikkai. His films focused on many family issues like dowry, need of remarriage for women, mother in law-daughter in law disputes and so on which were occurring that time. In most of his films there is a character named Uma, named after a school teacher who predicted his rise to fame after reading one of his scripts when he was a travel agent. During his last years before death, he wrote the script for a sequel to Samsaram Adhu Minsaram, which remains unfilmed.

== Personal life ==
In 2016, he joined and campaigned for BJP.

On 22 March 2020 at Chennai, Visu died of kidney failure at the age of 74.

== Awards ==
- Kalaimamani Award - 1998

== Filmography ==
=== As director ===
Year	Title	Language	Notes	Ref.
1982	Kanmani Poonga	Tamil		
1982	Manal Kayiru	Tamil		
1983	Dowry Kalyanam	Tamil		
1984	Puyal Kadantha Boomi	Tamil		
1984	Rajathanthiram	Tamil		
1984	Vaai Sollil Veeranadi	Tamil		
1984	Naanayam Illatha Naanayam	Tamil	also writer	
1985	Pudhiya Sagaptham	Tamil		
1985	Aval Sumangalithan	Tamil		
1985	Ketti Melam	Tamil		
1985	Chidambara Rahasiyam	Tamil		
1986	Samsaram Adhu Minsaram	Tamil	National Film Award for Best Popular Film Providing Wholesome Entertainment	
1987	Thirumathi Oru Vegumathi	Tamil		
1987	Kavalan Avan Kovalan	Tamil		
1987	Srimathi Oka Bahumathi	Telugu	Remake of Thirumathi Oru Vegumathi	
1988	Penmani Aval Kanmani	Tamil		
1988	Aadade Aadharam	Telugu	Remake of Penmani Aval Kanmani; Nandi Award for Second Best Story Writer	
1988	Illu Illalu Pillalu	Telugu	Remake of Veedu Manaivi Makkal	
1989	Sakalakala Sammandhi	Tamil		
1990	Varavu Nalla Uravu	Tamil	Tamil Nadu State Film Award for Best Story Writer	
1990	Vedikkai En Vadikkai	Tamil		
1992	Urimai Oonjaladugiradhu	Tamil		
1992	Neenga Nalla Irukkanum	Tamil	National Film Award for Best Film on Other Social Issues	
1994	Pattukottai Periyappa	Tamil		
1994	Vaa Magale Vaa	Tamil		
1996	Meendum Savithri	Tamil		
1996	Neti Savithri	Telugu		
2001	Sigamani Ramamani	Tamil		

=== As writer ===
Year	Title	Credited as	Notes	Ref.
Year	Title	Writer	Notes	Ref.
1977	Pattina Pravesam	Story		
1978	Sadhurangam	Story		
1980	Avan Aval Adhu	Screenplay		
1980	Mazhalai Pattalam	Dialogues		
1981	Thillu Mullu	Screenplay		
1981	Netrikkan	Story		
1981	Keezh Vaanam Sivakkum	Screenplay		
1981	Kudumbam Oru Kadambam	Yes		
1982	Simla Special	Yes		
1982	Pudukavithai	Screenplay		
1984	Nallavanukku Nallavan	Screenplay		
1986	Mr. Bharath	Screenplay		

=== As an actor ===
Year	Title	Role	Notes
1981	Thillu Mullu	One of the interview candidates	Also dubbing artist
1981	Kudumbam Oru Kadambam	Srinivasa Raghavan	
1982	Kanmani Poonga	Ramkumar	
1982	Manal Kayiru	Uthramerur Narathar Naidu	
1983	Oru Kai Paappom	Kai Adi Kamalakannan	
1983	Dowry Kalyanam	Ganesan	
1984	Nallavanukku Nallavan	Gangadharan	Special appearance
1984	Puyal Kadantha Boomi	Nammaalu allies Namachivaayan	
1984	Rajathanthiram	Bhairavan	
1984	Vaai Sollil Veeranadi	Vengapuli Varadhachari	
1984	Naanayam Illatha Naanayam	Veerapandithevar "Veerapandi"	
1984	Oorukku Upadesam	Sankaran	
1985	Pudhiya Sagaptham	Ramadasaradan	
1985	Aval Sumangalithan	Watchman Aarumugam	
1985	Ketti Melam	Chinna Paiyan	
1985	Chidambara Rahasiyam	Beemarao	
1986	Mr. Bharath	Kumaresa Gounder	
1986	Dharma Pathini	"Vicks" Vardarajan	Special appearance
1986	Samsaram Adhu Minsaram	Ammaiyappa Mudaliyar	
1986	Oomai Vizhigal	Rathnasabapathy	
1986	Mella Thirandhathu Kadhavu	Thulasi's father	
1986	Thaaiku Oru Thaalaattu	Ponnambalam	
1986	Anandha Kanneer	Paapa Panchu	
1987	Thirumathi Oru Vegumathi	Naagarkoil Naadhamuni	
1987	Kavalan Avan Kovalan	Chakravarthi's father-in-law	
1987	Kathai Kathaiyam Karanamam		
1987	Srimathi Oka Bahumathi	Bhadrachalam Rudraiah	Telugu film
1988	Veedu Manaivi Makkal	Subbaiah Pillai	
1988	Penmani Aval Kanmani	Radio Mama	
1988	Aadade Aadharam		Telugu film
1988	Mappillai Sir	Vakkil Varadharajan	
1988	Illu Illalu Pillalu		Telugu film
1989	Sakalakala Sammandhi	Mayavaram Malayappan	
1990	Varavu Nalla Uravu	Appa Ambalavanar	
1990	Vedikkai En Vadikkai	Kaavisattai Kandasamy	
1992	Urimai Oonjaladugiradhu	Kasturi's father	
1992	Neenga Nalla Irukkanum		
1992	Mannan	Viswanathan	
1993	Uzhaippali	Barrister	
1993	Sinna Mapplai	Marriage Broker	
1994	Pattukottai Periyappa	Pattukottai Periyappa	
1994	Aranmanai Kaavalan	Santhanam	
1994	Vaa Magale Vaa	Viswanathan	
1994	Vanaja Girija	Ramanathan	
1994	Vaanga Partner Vaanga	Ganapathi	
1995	Mayabazar	Vishwanathan	
1995	God Father	Viswanatham	Telugu film
1996	Meendum Savithri	Narayana Moorthy	
1996	Irattai Roja	Anchor	Guest appearance
1997	Nesam	Himself	
1997	Aravindhan		
1997	Adimai Changili		
1997	Vasuki	Ramasamy	
1997	Arunachalam	Adv. Rangachari	
1997	Sishya	Aadhimoolam	
1997	Vaimaye Vellum	Iyer, a temple Priest	
1998	Bhagavath Singh		
1999	Mannavaru Chinnavaru	Shanmugasundaram	
1999	Anbulla Kadhalukku	Chandrasekhar	
2000	Kakkai Siraginilae	Judge	
2000	Vaanavil	Himself	
2001	Sigamani Ramamani	Sundaramoorthy	
2001	Krishna Krishna	Advocate Viswanathan	Guest appearance
2001	Middle Class Madhavan	Advocate	
2001	Vadagupatti Maapillai	Gomathi Shankar	
2001	Looty	Dr. Kuzhanthavelu	
2001	Vedham		Guest appearance
2003	Thithikudhe	Himself	
2004	Maha Nadigan		
2005	Ji	Raghavan	
2007	Cheena Thaana 001	Governor	Guest appearance
2008	Ellam Avan Seyal		
2009	Innoruvan	Judge	
2009	Kannukulle		
2013	Alex Pandian	Chief Minister	
2013	Oruvar Meethu Iruvar Sainthu	Judge	
2014	Nenjirukkumvarai Ninaivirukkum		Guest appearance
2016	Manal Kayiru 2	Uthramerur Narathar Naidu	

Television

- Arattai Arangam - Sun TV
- Makkal Arangam - Jaya TV
- Naalavathu Mudichu - Jaya TV

=== Plays/novels ===
As writer

Year	Title	Notes	Ref.
1977	Pattina Pravesam	plays	
	Bharatha Matharkku Jai	plays	
	Kudumbam Oru Kadambam	plays	
	Modi Masthan	plays	
	Dowry Kalyana Vaibhogame	plays	
	Aval Sumangalithan	plays	
	Uravukku Kai Koduppom	plays	
	Meendum Savithri	novel	
