= R. Dilip =

Indian actor

Dilip
- Dilip in 2005
- Born: 26 October 1955; Mysore, Karnataka, India
- Died: 25 May 2012 (aged 56); Mysore, Karnataka, India
- Other name: Dilip
- Occupation: Actor
- Years active: 1980–2001
- Spouse: Hema (m.1989)
- Children: 2

R. Dilip (1955 – 25 May 2012) was an Indian actor who starred in Tamil, Kannada, Telugu and Malayalam films.

== Career ==
Dilip starred with Kamal Haasan in Varumayin Niram Sivappu and the false identity he took in the film became his stage name. Dilip later worked in many more films such as Njan Ekananu (1982), Selvi (1985), Samsaram Adhu Minsaram (1986), Mappillai (1989), Valli (1993) and Sigamani Ramamani (2001). He appeared in over 50 films altogether in the Malayalam, Tamil, and Kannada film industries.

== Partial filmography ==
- 1980 - Varumayin Niram Sivappu
- 1981 - Aakali Rajyam (Telugu)
- 1981 - Rail Payanangalil
- 1981 - Madhu Malar
- 1981 - Kilinjalgal
- 1982 - Amma
- 1982 - Nalanthana
- 1982 - Ninaivellam Nithya
- 1982 - Thunai
- 1982 - Om Shakti
- 1982 - Thottal Sudum
- 1982 - Nirandharam
- 1982 - Njan Ekananu (Malayalam)
- 1983 - Thoongadhey Thambi Thoongadhey
- 1983 - Soorapuli
- 1983 - Yamirukka Bayamen
- 1983 - Andha Sila Naatkal
- 1984 - Oorukku Upadesam
- 1984 - Thandikapatta Nyayangal
- 1984 - Vaai Sollil Veeranadi
- 1984 - Indina Ramayana (Kannada)
- 1985 - Selvi
- 1985 - Padikkadha Pannaiyar
- 1985 - Chithirame Chithirame
- 1986 - Samsaram Adhu Minsaram
- 1987 - Enga Ooru Pattukaran
- 1987 - Samsaram Oka Chadarangam (Telugu)
- 1988 - Penmani Aval Kanmani
- 1988 - Ennai Vittu Pogaathe
- 1988 - Palaivanathil Pattampoochi
- 1988 - Aadadhe Aadharam (Telugu)
- 1988 - Mappillai Sir
- 1988 - Ennai Vittu Pogathe
- 1988 - Solla Thudikuthu Manasu
- 1989 - Pillaikkaga
- 1989 - Shondham 16
- 1989 - Sakalakala Sammandhi
- 1989 - Orey Thai Orey Kulam
- 1989 - Thaaya Tharama
- 1989 - Mappillai
- 1989 - Pudhu Pudhu Arthangal
- 1990 - Engal Swamy Ayyappan
- 1990 - Mappillai Singam
- 1990 - Pengal Veettin Kangal
- 1990 - Vedikkai En Vadikkai
- 1990 - Pudhu Varisu
- 1990 - Shruthi (Kannada)
- 1991 - Dharma Durai
- 1991 - Nattai Thirudathe
- 1993 - Valli
- 1993 - Konjum Kili
- 1994 - Thuguve Krishnana (Kannada)
- 1996 - Thavarina Tottilu (Kannada)
- 2001 - Sigamani Ramamani

== Death ==
Dilip was suffering from a health ailment for the last few years of his life. He suffered a major heart arrest and died on 25 May 2012. He was survived by his wife, his daughter Bhavya and son Mourya.
