= Gentleman (1993 film) =

1993 Indian film by Shankar

- Theatrical release poster
- Directed by: Shankar
- Screenplay by: Shankar
- Story by: Shankar
- Dialogues by: Balakumaran
- Produced by: K. T. Kunjumon
- Starring: Arjun; Madhubala
- Cinematography: Jeeva
- Edited by: B. Lenin; V. T. Vijayan
- Music by: A. R. Rahman
- Production company: A. R. S. Film International
- Distributed by: A. R. S. Film International
- Release date: 30 July 1993
- Running time: 160 minutes
- Country: India
- Language: Tamil

Gentleman is a 1993 Indian Tamil-language heist action film written and directed by Shankar in his directorial debut, and produced by K. T. Kunjumon. The film stars Arjun Sarja and Madhubala while Subhashri, M. N. Nambiar, Manorama, Goundamani, Senthil, Charan Raj, Vineeth, and Rajan P. Dev play supporting roles. In the film, a respected Madras-based businessman moonlights as a thief to steal from the rich and give to the poor for their education.

Gentleman was released on 30 July 1993 and became a major commercial success, running for over 175 days in theatres. It won three South Filmfare Awards (including Best Film – Tamil and Best Director – Tamil), four Tamil Nadu State Film Awards (including Best Actor and Best Director) and five Cinema Express Awards. The film was a breakthrough for Arjun and Shankar and established them as among the top actors and directors, respectively, in Tamil cinema. It was remade in Hindi as The Gentleman (1994).

== Plot ==
In Ooty, Krishnamoorthy alias Kicha and his partner-in-crime, Mani, execute a high-profile multi-crore heist. Utilizing elaborate disguises to misdirect the police force, they escape aboard the Nilgiri Mountain Railway, deeply frustrating Inspector Ratnam. Publicly, Kicha is a highly respected, law-abiding citizen running a successful papadam business in Madras alongside Mani. Susheela, one of his many female employees, harbors a deep romantic fixation on him and persistently demands his attention. Her situation complicates with the arrival of her jovial cousin, Sugandhi, whose playful presence brings a lively dynamic to the household, underscored by petty rivalries between Mani and another employee, Babloo.

Sugandhi later develops romantic feelings for Kicha after he rescues her from a group of local thugs attempting to molest her. However, Kicha gently rejects her advances, explaining that he does not reciprocate her feelings and urging her to seek a suitable husband. Before returning home, Sugandhi covertly steals Kicha's unique signet ring as a sentimental souvenir. Concurrently, DIG Azhagar Nambi, a disgraced police officer tasked with capturing the elusive thief, suffers a humiliating scuffle with Kicha during a botched sting. Left with a distinct ring-shaped bruise on his face, Nambi obsessively investigates the imprint. He initially deduces the mark originated from a ceremonial ring worn by Brahmin priests, only to discover the design is actually a customized motif resembling a mangala sutra.

Nambi's parents soon pressure him into an arranged marriage with Sugandhi. During their interactions, Nambi notices Kicha's ring in her possession and learns of its true owner. Orchestrating a trap, Nambi attends a wedding dinner hosted at Kicha's residence and attempts an arrest. He shoots Kicha, but the latter narrowly escapes with a non-fatal hand injury. Kicha and Mani retreat to their secret headquarters, pursued covertly by Susheela. Confronting him over his illegal double life, an emotional Susheela threatens suicide, prompting Kicha to disclose his tragic motivations.

Years prior, Kicha and his friend Ramesh were district-level academic toppers. Despite their marks, both were denied admission to medical college, the places going to applicants whose families paids bribes. Kicha's mother and Ramesh subsequently died by suicide. Kicha then turned to stealing from the wealthy, with the aim of accumulating enough money to build a college offering free medical education to students selected on merit, regardless of income, caste, or religion.

In the present, requiring a final influx of capital to complete the university's construction, Kicha plans a high-stakes heist targeting the state's Chief Minister, who was the corrupt education minister responsible for soliciting the bribe years earlier. Despite knowing Nambi has established a heavy police dragnet, Kicha successfully steals the funds but is ultimately cornered and arrested by Nambi.

During his highly publicized trial, Kicha uses the courtroom as a platform to expose the deeply entrenched political corruption within the education system, demanding the Chief Minister be summoned to face cross-examination. Although Kicha's testimony successfully exposes his historical crimes to the public, legal technicalities allow the politician to walk free. Outraged by this miscarriage of justice, a radicalized youth in the gallery, triggered by Kicha's emotional speech, assassinates the Chief Minister in a suicide bombing outside the court.

Six years later, having fully served their prison sentences, Kicha and Mani inaugurate the medical college, with Nambi, Sugandhi, their child, and Susheela present.

== Cast ==
- Arjun as Krishnamoorthy "Kicha"
- Madhubala as Susheela
- Subhashri as Sugandhi
- M. N. Nambiar as Ramesh's father
- Manorama as Kicha's mother
- Goundamani as Mani
- Senthil as Babloo
- Charan Raj as DIG Azhagar Nambi
- Gautami (special appearance in the song "Chikku Bukku Rayile")
- Prabhu Deva (special appearance in "Chikku Bukku Rayile")
- Raju (special appearance in "Chikku Bukku Rayile")
- Vineeth as Ramesh
- Rajan P. Dev as the chief minister
- Ajay Rathnam as Inspector Ratnam
- Prasanna as the lawyer
- Omakuchi Narasimhan
- Chokkalinga Bhagavathar as Susheela's father

Uncredited

- Adithya Madhavan as a little boy in "Chikku Bukku Rayile"
- Raghava Lawrence as a dancer in "Chikku Bukku Rayile"
- Rajendran as a henchman

== Production ==
=== Development ===
After scoring back-to-back successes like Vasanthakala Paravai (1991) and Surieyan (1992), producer K. T. Kunjumon of A. R. S. Film International wanted to collaborate again with director Pavithran and actor R. Sarathkumar; however since they went on to do other projects, the collaboration did not happen. Photographer Stills Ravi and editor V. T. Vijayan suggested the name of S. Shankar who worked as an assistant in these two films. Shankar had prepared a story, but it was rejected by many producers. After listening to the story, an impressed Kunjumon decided to produce the film which would later be titled Gentleman, but on the condition that Shankar accept any changes he suggest, to which Shankar agreed, making his directorial debut. While Shankar also wrote the screenplay, Kunjumon selected Balakumaran to write the dialogues. Cinematography was handled by Jeeva, editing by Vijayan and B. Lenin, and art direction by Maghi, while Vikram Dharma was the action choreographer.

=== Casting and filming ===
The initial story revolved the militancy of a Brahmin youth. Shankar wanted Kamal Haasan to play the lead at this stage, but he refused because he felt the story was too similar to Guru (1980) in which he acted and did not like Shankar's take on the concept. When Arjun was approached, he was reluctant. According to him, at a time when he was struggling no directors wanted to cast him in their films until the success of Sevagan (1992) which was directed by Arjun himself. Therefore, when Shankar approached him with the script of Gentleman, he decided to decline without listening to the script just as he did to a few other directors. But he listened to the script after much persuasion and, impressed by the story, decided to do it. Madhubala was cast after Shankar was impressed with her performance in Roja (1992).

The song "Chikku Bukku Rayile" was mostly shot at Egmore railway station. The climax scene where a student kills the antagonist in a suicide bombing was inspired from the assassination of the then President of Sri Lanka, Ranasinghe Premadasa. Kunjumon insisted that Shankar rewrite the climax by adding this element, much to the dissatisfaction of Arjun, who felt that his heroism would be diluted. However, Kunjumon remained adamant and it was shot as per his wish. The filming took seven months to be completed.

== Themes ==
Critics have noted the film's resemblance to Ore Oru Gramathiley (1987) due to caste-based reservation being a mutual theme in both and the protagonist being a Brahmin who rebels against this, and Karuppu Panam (1964).

== Soundtrack ==
Gentleman

Soundtrack album by A. R. Rahman
- Released: 1993
- Recorded: Panchathan Record Inn
- Genre: Feature film soundtrack
- Length: 23:42
- Labels: Pyramid; Aditya Music; Lahari Music; T-Series
- Producer: A.R. Rahman

A. R. Rahman chronology
Pudhiya Mugam (1993)	Gentleman (1993)	Kizhakku Cheemayile (1993)
External audio
- Audio Jukebox (Tamil) on YouTube
- Audio Jukebox (Telugu) on YouTube

The score and soundtrack were composed by A. R. Rahman. Initially Shankar wanted Ilaiyaraaja to compose for the film later he was sceptical about the choice. Vairamuthu wrote the lyrics for all songs except "Chikku Bukku Rayile", which was written by Vaali. The songs were recorded at Panchathan Record Inn, and the soundtrack was released under the Pyramid label. The film and soundtrack were dubbed and released in Telugu with the same name. The lyrics were penned by Rajasri for this version. The original Tamil soundtrack sold over 300,000 cassettes.

The opening of the song "Ottagathai Kattiko" is often thought to have been inspired from the 1991 Telugu song, "Eddem Ante Teddam Antav", composed by Raj–Koti and sung by Malgudi Subha from the album Chik Pak Chik Bam; in reality, Rahman, who was an arranger in Raj–Koti's team, helped them in composing the original song. Once when Rahman went to visit a friend whose house was near a railway station, the sound of trains frequently disturbed their conversation; nonetheless, the train sounds inspired Rahman to compose "Chikku Bukku Rayile". "Ottagathai Kattiko" is set in the Carnatic raga known as Dharmavati, "En Veetu Thotathil" has shades of Chenchurutti and Neelambari, "Parkathey" is set in Mohanam, "Usalampatti Penkutti" is also set in Dharmavati.

The songs from Gentleman were reused in the Hindi remake The Gentleman (1994), though only Anu Malik was credited for the music. "Ottagathai Kattiko" was later remixed by the French rap group La Caution as "Pilotes Automatique".

Tamil
No.	Title	Lyrics	Singer(s)	Length
1.	"Chikku Bukku Rayile"	Vaali	Suresh Peters, G. V. Prakash Kumar	5:24
2.	"Usalampatti Penkutti"	Vairamuthu	Shahul Hameed, Swarnalatha	4:41
3.	"Parkathey"	Vairamuthu	Minmini, Srinivas, Noel James	4:29
4.	"En Veetu Thotathil"	Vairamuthu	S. P. Balasubrahmanyam, Sujatha Mohan	3:56
5.	"Ottagathai Kattiko"	Vairamuthu	S. P. Balasubrahmanyam, S. Janaki, Sujatha Mohan, Minmini	5:15
Total length:				23:45

Telugu
No.	Title	Singer(s)	Length
1.	"Chikubuku Raile"	Suresh Peters, G. V. Prakash Kumar	5:24
2.	"Mudinepalli"	Shahul Hameed, Malgudi Subha, Swarnalatha	4:40
3.	"Maavele Maavele"	Minmini, Srinivas, Noel James	4:29
4.	"Naa Inti Mundunna"	S. P. Balasubrahmanyam, Sujatha Mohan	3:51
5.	"Kontegaadni Kattuko"	S. P. Balasubrahmanyam, S. Janaki	5:15
Total length:			23:39

== Release ==
Gentleman was released on 30 July 1993. Kunjumon promoted the film by playing trailers on television sets situated on suburban railway stations. He had to distribute the film on his own since no distributors were willing to buy this film as they felt it "looked like a dubbed film". Despite this, it became a major success, running for over 175 days in theatres.

=== Critical reception ===
Writing for The Indian Express on 6 August 1993, Malini Mannath said, "Shankar makes a promising debut infusing his script with action, sentiment, comedy and even some titillating scenes for added measure and tries to give something different within the parameters of commercial cinema. Jeeva's camera is effective in capturing the well choreographed stunt scenes (Vikram Dharma)." K. Vijiyan of New Straits Times wrote on 14 August 1993, "Sankar .. has provided thought-provoking story [..] build up the story well, making us eager to find out why the hero is committing all those robberies." On 22 August 1993, Ananda Vikatan rated the film 50 out of 100.

=== Accolades ===
Event	Category	Recipient	Ref.
41st Filmfare Awards South	Best Film – Tamil	K. T. Kunjumon	
41st Filmfare Awards South	Best Director – Tamil	Shankar	
41st Filmfare Awards South	Best Music Director – Tamil	A. R. Rahman	
1993 Tamil Nadu State Film Awards	Best Actor	Arjun	
1993 Tamil Nadu State Film Awards	Best Director	Shankar	
1993 Tamil Nadu State Film Awards	Best Music Director	A. R. Rahman	
1993 Tamil Nadu State Film Awards	Best Female Playback Singer	Sujatha (for "En Veetu Thotathil")	
14th Cinema Express Awards	Best Picture (Special Award)	K. T. Kunjumon	
14th Cinema Express Awards	Best Actor (Special Award)	Arjun	
14th Cinema Express Awards	Best New Face Director	Shankar	
14th Cinema Express Awards	Best Music Director	A. R. Rahman	
14th Cinema Express Awards	Best Stunt Master	Vikram Dharma	

== Re-release ==
A remastered version is scheduled for release on 11 December 2026.

== Legacy ==
In the 2019 Tamil film Hero, Arjun portrays Sathyamoorthy (whose name is similar to Krishnamoorthy), a man who steals money from the rich to build a school that is free for everyone. The 2021 film Dikkiloona was titled after the word used by Goundamani and Senthil in Gentleman. In June 2022, a sequel was announced with Kunjumon returning as the producer, and Gokul Krishna directing.

== Bibliography ==
- Dhananjayan, G. (2011). The Best of Tamil Cinema, 1931 to 2010: 1977–2010. Galatta Media. ISBN 978-81-921043-0-0.
- Mathai, Kamini (2009). A. R. Rahman: The Musical Storm. Viking. ISBN 978-0-670-08371-8.
- Sundararaman (2007) [2005]. Raga Chintamani: A Guide to Carnatic Ragas Through Tamil Film Music (2nd ed.). Pichhamal Chintamani. OCLC 295034757.
