= Mattuthavani (film) =

2012 Indian film by Pavithran

- Theatrical release poster
- Directed by: Pavithran
- Written by: Pavithran
- Starring: Ramkiran; Meenakshi
- Cinematography: S. Sriganesan
- Edited by: V. T. Vijayan
- Music by: Deva
- Production company: ARS International
- Release date: 20 April 2012
- Country: India
- Language: Tamil

Mattuthavani is a 2012 Indian Tamil-language action drama film written and directed by Pavithran. The film stars Ramkiran and Meenakshi, whilst Soori and Vimal appear in supporting roles, with music composed by Deva. It was released on 20 April 2012 after a three-year delay.

== Cast ==
- Ramkiran as Panneer
- Meenakshi as Maheshwari
- Kadhal Dhandapani as Samudrakani
- Soori as Panneer's friend
- Vimal as Panneer's friend
- Sathish
- Meetha
- Menaka
- Singamuthu
- Bonda Mani as Tea seller
- Nellai Siva
- T. P. Gajendran
- Appukutty
- Ponnambalam in an item number

== Production ==
The film serves as a comeback for director Pavithran. In November 2009, he held an event to showcase the film to the media, revealing that the film would feature an all-new cast.

== Soundtrack ==
The soundtrack was composed by Deva.

Song	Singers	Lyrics
Annanmaare	M. K. Muthu	Mani Muthu
Kadhalikka Poravare I	Vineeth Sreenivasan	Mani Muthu
Kadhalikka Poravare II	Mani Muthu	Mani Muthu
Maana Madhuraikku	Kariyapatti Lakshmi, Pandi	Mani Muthu
Urunda Mala	Manikka Vinayagam	Mani Muthu

== Release and reception ==
The film faced numerous delays in its release. A release in April 2009 was planned, but unsuccessful. The film eventually released on 20 April 2012. A critic from The Times of India wrote that "It is difficult to believe that the movie is directed by the same Pavithran who had earlier given us movies like Suriyan and I love India". Thinnai also gave a negative review, noting how outdated it looked.
