= Rajasri (writer) =

Indian lyricist and dialogue writer (1934–1994)

- Born: Indukuri Ramakrishnam Raju; 31 August 1934; Vizianagaram, Andhra Pradesh
- Died: 14 August 1994 (59 age); Chennai, India
- Citizenship: India
- Education: B.Sc Physics
- Alma mater: Maharajah College, Vizianagaram
- Writing career
- Genres: Lyricist, screenwriter, film director, music composer

Indukuri Ramakrishnam Raju (31 August 1934 – 14 August 1994), commonly known by his pen name Rajasri, was an Indian lyricist, screenwriter, film director, and music composer in Telugu cinema. He worked on nearly 1000 films, with a significant portion being dubbed films. Rajasri was especially known for writing Telugu lyrics for many films dubbed from Tamil during the 1980s and early 1990s. Due to his contributions to dubbed films, he earned the title "Anuvaada Brahma" (transl. 'Brahma of dubbed films').

== Early life ==
Rajasri was born as Indukuri Ramakrishnam Raju to Indukuri Appalaraju and Narayanamma on 31 August 1934 in Vizianagaram. Right from early childhood he started writing stories and metrical poetry. He completed his BSc (physics) from Maharajah's College in Vizianagaram. He learned typewriting. He worked as a typist-cum-personal-assistant in Srikakulam District Board.

== Career ==
Rajasri resigned his job and moved to Madras. He started assisting writer Pinisetty Sriramamurthy. The first film he worked for as a lyricist was Aada Pettanam (1954), produced by Kadaru Nagabhushanam and Kannamba. He also worked as an assistant director for Kadaru Nagabhusnam for the films like Aada Pettanam, Anna-Thammudu, Paruvu-Pratishta, Santha, Nithya Kalyanam Paccha Thoranam, Veera Bhaskarudu, and Sri Krishna Maaya.

Rajasri worked with L. V. Prasad in the story department of Prasad Productions for the films like Sasural (1961), Khilona (1970), Thayilla Pillai etc. He wrote lyrics for films like Rama Sundari. He worked with Chalam for some memorable films like Sambarala Rambabu (1970), Bullemma Bullodu, Devudamma, Thulaabhaaram (1974), Ramude Devudu, Ooriki Upakaari etc. He also wrote some memorable songs in these films.

Rajasri has worked with director Mani Ratnam for films like Mouna Ragam (1986), Naayakudu (1987), Gharshana (1988), Anjali (1990), Dalapathi (1991), Roja (1992), and Donga Donga (1993). Mani Ratnam got the dialogues written by Rajasri for his straight Telugu film Geethanjali (1989).

Rajasri has also composed music for a few films like Mama Kodalu (1993) and Venkanna Babu (1992) directed by Dasari Narayana Rao.

== Death ==
He died in his sleep while working for the film Premikudu on 14 August 1994, in Chennai.

His son Rajasri Sudhakar is also a dialogue writer and lyricist. Sudhakar has penned dialogues and songs for films like Krrish, Jodha Akbar, Krrish 3, Dhoom 2, Dangal, Dabangg 3 and Vikranth Rona that were dubbed into Telugu.

== Discography ==
=== As lyricist for straight films ===
| Year | Movie | Music Director | Song(s) | Ref(s) |
|---|---|---|---|---|
| 1964 | Sri Simhachala Kshetra Mahima | T. V. Raju | "Simhachalamu", "Jayahe", "Deva O Deva", "Andala O Sundara", "Babu Veerana", "Oppula Kuppa", "Ravoyi Raja" | |
| 1966 | Bheemanjaneya Yuddham | T. V. Raju | "Jaya Jaya Janaki Rama" | |
| 1968 | Pelli Roju | M. S. Sreeram | "Pellivaaramandi", "Jeevithana Maruvalemu" | |
| 1969 | Satthekaalapu Sattheyya | M. S. Viswanathan | "Prajalantha Kolichedi" | |
| 1970 | Sambarala Rambabu | V. Kumar | "Mama Chandamama (male)", "Mama Chandamama (female)", "Jeevitamante Antuleni Oka Poratam", "Poruginti Meenakshammanu Chusara?" | |
| 1971 | Mattilo Manikyam | Sathyam | "Eddubandi Chudu" | |
| 1972 | Bullemma Bullodu | Sathyam | "Budigi Budigi Ninne Ninne", "Kursindi Vaana", "Raajaa Pilupu Needenuraa", "Nee Papam Pandenu Nedu Nee Bharatham Padatha Chudu", "Diyyare Tinguranga Chusuko Mava" | |
| 1972 | Hantakulu Devantakulu | Sathyam | "Adugulu Kadhipi", "Chinnoda Nalo", "Lakki Lakki Aata", "Hare Rama Hare Krishna" | |
| 1972 | Korada Rani | Sathyam | "Thaginodu Mata" | |
| 1972 | Mathrumoorthy | Pendyala Nageswara Rao | "Yeda Moham Peda Moham", "Nee Needaga Nannu Kadaladanee" | |
| 1973 | Devudamma | Sathyam | "Ekkado Doorana" | |
| 1974 | Kannavaari Kalalu | V. Kumar | "Sorry So Sorry", "Andaalu Kanuvindu", "Chelichoopulona", "Madhuvolakabose" | |
| 1974 | Nija Roopalu | S. Hanumantha Rao | "Raja Rajasri" | |
| 1974 | Tulabharam | Sathyam | "Radhaku Neeve Ra Pranam", " E Uru E Peru" | |
| 1975 | Chaduvu Samskaram | Ramesh Naidu | "Love Is Blind Prema Guddidi" | |
| 1976 | Maa Daivam | K. V. Mahadevan | "Okey Kulam Okey" | |
| 1976 | Adrushtavanturaalu | Sathyam | "Rammu Taagali" | |
| 1978 | Patnavasam | J. V. Raghavulu | "Kavali.. Em Kavali" | |
| 1978 | Allari Pillalu | Sathyam | "Na Rasi Kanya Rasi.. Ne Rasi Midhuna Rasi" | |
| 1979 | Maa Voori Devata | K. Chakravarthy | "Muddabanti Puvvu" | |
| 1980 | Seetha Ramulu | Sathyam | "Bunga Moothi" | |
| 1980 | Pilla Zamindar | K. Chakravarthy | "Monnane Mothaga", "Geru Maarchu", "Vayasemo Aravai", "Andhaalolike Nandakishorudu", "Naa Peru Baalaraju", "Sambho Sankara Mahadeva" | |
| 1980 | Yedanthasthula Meda | K. Chakravarthy | "Aratipandu Valachi Pedithe", "Idhi Megha Sandhesamo" | |
| 1980 | Sujata | Ramesh Naidu | "Adadi Aravindam" | |
| 1980 | Sardar Paparayudu | K. Chakravarthy | "Hello Temper..vijaya Super" | |
| 1980 | Ragilina Paga | K. Chakravarthy | "Kathilanti Kannepillalu" | |
| 1981 | Viswaroopam | K. Chakravarthy | "Kanulu Chaalavu" | |
| 1981 | Bangaru Koduku | K. Chakravarthy | "Papa O Chantipapa", "Gilli Gilli Cheppana", "Meluko Sriranga" | |
| 1981 | Sangeetha | S. P. Balasubrahmanyam | "Akasaniki Ravi Kiranam Arani Harati", "Chebuta Katha Chebuta" | |
| 1981 | Swapna | Sathyam | "Ide Na Modati Premalekha", "Andala Rasiga Posi", "Sreerastu Abbayi" | |
| 1981 | Jeevita Radham | K. Chakravarthy | "Chigurakulalo Oka Chilakamma" | |
| 1981 | Swargam | K. Chakravarthy | "Veyyana - Thalam Veyyana", "Kondapalli Bomma" | |
| 1982 | Swayamvaram | Sathyam | "Nenikkada", "Harivillu", "Aakasam Yenduko", "Ikkada Ekkada" | |
| 1983 | Roshagadu | Sathyam | "Atchatla Mutchatla", "Chinnadani Konachoopu", "Nenante Choodu Nene", "Yavvanam Neeku Swagatham" | |
| 1983 | Simhapuri Simham | J. V. Raghavulu | "Chilipithanam Theegalle" | |
| 1983 | Khaidi | K. Chakravarthy | "Idemitabba" | |
| 1983 | Sri Ranga Neethulu | K. Chakravarthy | "Andalamma Nuvvu Naku Chendalamma", "Panchami Puta Manchidani" | |
| 1983 | Agni Samadhi | Sathyam | "Nee Thodu Kaavaali" | |
| 1983 | Chandi Chamundi | Sathyam | "Disco Disco Disco" | |
| 1984 | Sangeetha Samrat | Ramesh Naidu | "Idhi Kannulu Palike" | |
| 1985 | Palnati Simham | K. Chakravarthy | "Ayamma Ayamma" | |
| 1985 | Maya Mohini | K. Chakravarthy | "Ekkada Unna Nee Pakkane", "Chukka Chukka", "Pala Vayasu Pongani" | |
| 1985 | Maa Inti Mahalakshmi | Sathyam | "O Deva Nagaraja", "Pedavulu Palikenu", "Ravvantha Regindammaa", "Aligithe Choodaali" | |
| 1986 | Veta | K. Chakravarthy | "Oorevitammaa Perevitammaa" | |
| 1986 | Jeevana Raagam | Sathyam | "Nuvve Nandhanamu" | |
| 1986 | Thalambralu | Sathyam | "Idhi Paata" | |
| 1986 | Sakkanodu | K. V. Mahadevan | "Pettuko Raasipettuko" | |
| 1987 | Donga Mogudu | K. Chakravarthy | "Idly Papa Idly Papa" | |
| 1994 | Khaidi Number One | M. M. Keeravaani | "Oke Oka Pallavi" | |

=== As lyricist for dubbed films ===
| Year | Movie | Music Director | Song(s) | Notes | Ref(s) |
|---|---|---|---|---|---|
| 1979 | Ajeyudu | Ilaiyaraaja | "Darling Darling", "Sree Raamuni Sreedevive", "Nee Pedavula Lona", "Chakkani Prakruthi Andaalu" | Dubbed version of Priya | |
| 1979 | Mullu Puvvu | Ilaiyaraaja | "Andala Mulaka", "Sakkanaina Saddikudu", "Ramudu Rajaina" | Dubbed version of Mullum Malarum | |
| 1980 | Kalyana Ramudu | Ilaiyaraaja | "Nene Neeku Pranam", "Manasunarege", "Yedo Raagam", "Neeke Manasu Icchaa" | Dubbed version of Kalyanaraman | |
| 1981 | Chilipi Mogudu | Ilaiyaraaja | "Ninna Sandhya Velalo", "Radha Radha", "Oh Chinna Maata" | Dubbed version of Meendum Kokila | |
| 1982 | Madhura Geetham | Ilaiyaraaja | "Navvula Lona Puvvula Vana", "Monnati Sambaru Udakani Annam", "Ananda Ragam Kore Prayam", "Konda Gali Tirige" | Dubbed version of Panneer Pushpangal | |
| 1982 | Bandhipotu Simham | M. S. Viswanathan | "Paadandi Okatai Cherandi", "Mallela Pandirilo", "Kulike Allari Andham" | Dubbed version of Ranuva Veeran | |
| 1982 | Naa Pere Jaani | Ilaiyaraaja | "Ragile Ee Naageetham", "Chakkadanaala Chinnadhira", "Oka Kanne Manasu" | Dubbed version of Johnny | |
| 1983 | Chattam | Gangai Amaran | "Virivana Jallulai" | Dubbed version of Sattam | |
| 1983 | Prema Sagaram | T. Rajendar | "Banthade Bangaaru", "Chakkanaina O Chirugali", "Naamam Pettu Naamam", "Nee Thalape Maikam", "Neelo Naalo", "Andhalolike Sundari" | Dubbed version of Uyirullavarai Usha | |
| 1983 | Debbaku Debba | Ilaiyaraaja | "Joru Vana Kurishindhi", "Ra Ra Mama", "Aata Paata", "Ammayi Andalani" | Dubbed version of Paayum Puli | |
| 1984 | Jalsaa Rayudu | Ilaiyaraaja | "Choope Ghatainadi", "Nelaku Ningi", "Padaku Midisi", "Oh Naanna" | Dubbed version of Thoongathey Thambi Thoongathey | |
| 1984 | Prema Samrajyam | T. Rajendar | "Anudinam - 1984", "Prathireyi Prathi Pagalu", "Idhi Raathri Samayam", "Sannayi Dolu Melam", "Galipata", "Anudinam - Disco", "Ye Maradala", "Lokalu Elevada" | Dubbed version of Thangaikkor Geetham | |
| 1984 | Goondaalaku Goonda | M. S. Viswanathan | "Mister Miranda", "Nenalanti", "Aha Muthyaka", "Challani Naachelli" | Dubbed version of Sivappu Sooriyan | |
| 1984 | Kodama Simhalu | Ilaiyaraaja | "Edhi Paapam Edhi Shaapam", "Poochendulo Viruyu", "Poochendulo Viruyu - Sad" | Dubbed version of Neengal Kettavai | |
| 1985 | Kaidhiveta | Ilaiyaraaja | "Abc Chadavali", "O Myna", "Oka Roja Puvvu" | Dubbed version of Oru Kaidhiyin Diary | |
| 1985 | Love Story | Ilaiyaraaja | "Andhala Pule", "Palike Adharam", "Kurra Vayasu", "Oohalanni" | Dubbed version of Anbe Odi Vaa | |
| 1985 | Radha Madhavi | Ilaiyaraaja | "Maatalone", "Vintha Paruvaana", "Kottandehe", "Kuliki Kuliki" | Dubbed version of Kanne Radha | |
| 1985 | Jalsa Bullodu | Ilaiyaraaja | "Dikkulani Pandenule", "Andaala Aamani", "Em Kavalo Tinandra", "Velase Mahalakshmiye" | Dubbed version of Uyarndha Ullam | |
| 1986 | Agent Vikram 007 | Ilaiyaraaja | "Vikram", "Vanithamani", "Naa Jodi", "Vayasu" | Dubbed from Vikram | |
| 1986 | Mouna Ragam | Ilaiyaraaja | "Thadi Thadi", "Cheli Rava", "Oh Mega", "Chimi Chimi", "Malla Poola" | Dubbed version of Mouna Ragam | |
| 1987 | Kedi | Ilaiyaraaja | "Hey Ninne Ninne", "Kanule Palikene", "Jaathi Eandi", "Koo Koo Koile Kusenu", "Amavasi Nisilo" | Dubbed version of Kadhal Parisu | |
| 1987 | Rendu Thokala Pitta | Ilaiyaraaja | "Naa Andamaina", "Sandhyavela Paadinadi", "Swatantraanni Tecchukunnam" | Dubbed version of Rettai Vaal Kuruvi | |
| 1987 | Nayakudu | Ilaiyaraaja | "Chalaki Chinadi", "Naa Navve Deepavali", "Sande Poddu Megham" | Dubbed version of Nayakan | |
| 1987 | Aadhi Shakthi Mahimulu | K. V. Mahadevan | "Ninnu Nenu", "Amma Needu", "Ananthiga", "Kannu Penchhina", "Punya Sagara", "Oorikai Paadave" | Dubbed version of Mel Maruvathoor Arpudhangal | |
| 1988 | Dance Raja Dance | Vijayanand | "Dance Raja", "Naa Naadithe", "Ningi Nainu", "Amma Amma", "Sangeetha Madhurim Naa", "Om Namo" | Dubbed version of Dance Raja Dance | |
| 1988 | Sister Nandini | Ilaiyaraaja | "Vayyari Chilaka", "Inthe Inthe", "Krishna Raavela", "Addari Needi", "Aathma Balam Penchuko", "Chandaname Neeve" | Dubbed version of Manathil Urudhi Vendum | |
| 1988 | Satya | Ilaiyaraaja | "Okate Manakika Maata", "Jarugu Jarugu", "Paruvaalu Kanivini Erugani" | Dubbed version of Sathyaa | |
| 1988 | Prema Lokam | Hamsalekha | "Paruvam Needenani", "Satileni Premalokam", "Toli Aasalu Pongee", "Boy Friend - Boy Friend", "Nuvve Nenani Thalachaane", "Chilakamma Chittemma", "Oka Muddabanthi", "Evare Veedu", "Eh Mama Biku Nerpava", "Mosagaadina", "Levandi Premikulu" | Dubbed version of Premaloka | |
| 1988 | Gharshana | Ilaiyaraaja | "Ninnukori", "Oka Brundavanam", "Rojalo Letha Roja", "Kurise Verijallule, "Neeve Amaraswarame", "Raja Rajadhi" | Dubbed version of Agni Natchathiram | |
| 1988 | Police Diary | Ilaiyaraaja | "Manakosam Madhumasam", "Naa Oopiri Neevenule", "Vacchaadu Aggipidugu", "Aade Eedu Needi Naadi" | Dubbed version of Soora Samhaaram | |
| 1988 | Nenu Meevadine | K. Bhagyaraj | "Premante", "Idhi Sandhela Ratri", "Panakala Swamy", "Sangeetham", "Pramadevuni" | Dubbed version of Idhu Namma Aalu | |
| 1989 | Sindhoora Puvvu | Manoj–Gyan | "Sindhura Puvva", "Chilaka Rachilaka", "Kanivini Yerugani", "Ninu Yevaro Kottarata", "Thurupamma Mudda", "Yetilona Yelleti" | Dubbed version of Senthoora Poove | |
| 1989 | Vichitra Sodarulu | Ilaiyaraaja | "Raja Cheyyi Vesthe", "Bujji Pelli Kodukki", "Ninnu Thalachi", "Vedi Vedi Aasalaku", "Aadedhi Nenura" | Dubbed version of Apoorva Sagodharargal | |
| 1989 | City Rowdy | Shankar–Ganesh | "Megham Karisi", "Mogudini Konguna", "My Dear Young Lover", "Vendi Meghamulu" | Dubbed version of Jhansi Rani | |
| 1989 | Premanjali | Ilaiyaraaja | ''Brundaavaname Naakosame'' "Hey Chitti Naannaa" "Koothaku Vacchenu" "Raagaale Paadedhane" | Dubbed version of Varusham 16 | |
| 1989 | Rajadhi Raja | Ilaiyaraaja | "Palikenu Sonthasam" "Naa Thoti Potadithe" "Maava New Pillanivvu" "Maata Amma Maata Amma" | Dubbed version of Rajadhi Raja | |
| 1989 | Mayakrishnudu | Shankar–Ganesh | "Aha Raagala Rachilakale", "Chinna Raja Aha Chinna Raja", "O Kartika Pornami", "Ee Ragamu Ee Thalamu", "Naa Pere Sweety" | Dubbed version of En Rathathin Rathame | |
| 1989 | Naaku Mogudu Kaavali | Upendra Kumar | "Chilipi Oohalu", "O Chinnadana", "Chukkalanti Oka Chukka", "Baduke Swargam", "Oka Prema Katha", "Ika Guarantee" | Dubbed version of Nanjundi Kalyana | |
| 1990 | Tiger Siva | Ilaiyaraaja | "Are Bullodaa", "Aha Raadhakka", "Naa Jaabili", "Aha Neelo Naalo", "Andamaina" | Dubbed version of Siva | |
| 1990 | Rajadhi Raja | Ilaiyaraaja | "Palikenu Santhosham", "Naathoti Potaadithe", "Aha Yeti Oddunundanta", "Paade Paala Manase", "Maawaa Nee Pillanivvu", "Maatammaa Maatammaa" | Dubbed version of Rajadhi Raja | |
| 1990 | Sreedevi | Shiv-Hari | "Ade Thene Sirijallu", "Mogutunnayi Gajula", "Sreedevee", "Ee Chelimi Ee Kalimi", "Paruvala Jaoivana", "Neevoo Nenoo Oohalalo", "Attarintiki Ne Vellanu", "Nagaralaku Tal Nagaramidi", "Navu Vinalile Nakatha" | Dubbed version of Chandni | |
| 1990 | Garagatta Gopaiah | Ilaiyaraaja | "Palikindi Kulikindi", "Ragame Kotha Yogame", "Ooru Kani Oore Vachi", "Gunde Pagili", "Desamlo Enno Pallelu", "Oho Moola Vinayakuda", "Palikindi Kulikindi (Duet)", "Nandana Vanamuna", "Mokkenamma" | Dubbed version of Karakattakkaran | |
| 1990 | Vijethalu | Ilaiyaraaja | "Edye Thullinadhi", "Marugo Marugo", "Ningi Choodu", "Thathom Talangu", "Undali Nee Gundelo" | Dubbed version of Vettri Vizhaa | |
| 1990 | Anjali | Ilaiyaraaja | "Paattaku", "Meda Paina", "Chanda Mama", "Anjali Anjali", "Vegam Vegam", "Raathiri Vela", "Gaganam" | Dubbed version of Anjali | |
| 1990 | Prema Paavuraalu | Raamlaxman | "Nee Jathaleka - S.P.Balasubramaniam", "Nuvve Naaku Lokam", "Nee Jathaleka", "Premincha Premincha", "Sneha Bandham Pongena", "Saayam Sanja Velayyindhi", "Oh Pravurama", "Mallikavaa Rangavalliva", "Antakshari", "Nee Jathaleka - K.S.Chithra" | Dubbed version of Maine Pyar Kiya | |
| 1990 | Rustum Rudrayya | Ilaiyaraaja | "Vuntanu Neethoduga", "Videsala Kellina", "Chinni Chinni Chilaka", "Mavuri Englad Rani", "Devadasu Kathalaga" | Dubbed version of Padicha Pulla | |
| 1990 | Chilipi Pellam | K. Bhagyaraj | "Chilipiga Gorinka", "Emi Figure", "Neekantikoka Velugai", "Ea Lokame Pichollura", "Thalale Vestarule" | Dubbed version of Aararo Aariraro | |
| 1990 | O Papa Lali | Ilaiyaraaja | "Neevega Na Pranam", "Mate Rani", "Karpura Bomma", "Sagali Sandela", "Jeevana Mangala", "Yemi Padedi" | Dubbed version of Keladi Kannmanii | |
| 1990 | Nava Vasantham | S. A. Rajkumar | "Veyyi Thalam", "Kannulu Kurise", "Vacchanu", "Gowriki", "Idi Tolakari", "Paatalalo", "Paatalaloni" | Dubbed version of Pudhu Vasantham | |
| 1991 | Lawyer The Great | Ilaiyaraaja | "One Two Three Four", "Naa Raja Vacchadu, "Akasha Veedhilo" | Dubbed version of Mounam Sammadham | |
| 1991 | Michael Madana Kamaraju | Ilaiyaraaja | "Rambam Bam", "Sundari", "Shiva Ratiri", "Katha Chebutha", "Ee Kerintha" | Dubbed version of Michael Madana Kama Rajan | |
| 1991 | Dalapathi | Ilaiyaraaja | "Singarala", "Sundari Neeve", "Muddabanti", "Ada Janmaku", "Yamuna Thatilo", "Chilakamma", "Yamuna Thatilo (Sad)" | Dubbed version of Thalapathi | |
| 1991 | Anubandhalu | Ilaiyaraaja | "Paade Choodu", "Oh Janani Naa Vani", "Padana Na Swaramu", "Pachchani Pandarilona", "Daivale Deevinchina" | Dubbed version of Pudhiya Raagam | |
| 1991 | Prema Paatam | Ilaiyaraaja | "Kodi Koose Velalo", "Idi Chaithrama", "Maatalu Nerchina Raachilaka", "Mamathala Kovelalo", "Emito" | Dubbed version of Vanna Vanna Pookkal | |
| 1991 | Amar | Adithyan | "Vasanthama Cherava", "Chakkanaina Chukkallara", "Musthafaa Musthafaa", "Thamalapaku Shokila", "Chakkanaina Chukkallara", "Kalla Bajaru" | Dubbed version of Amaran | |
| 1992 | Chilipi Sipayi | K. Bhagyaraj | "Aasalunna Pilla", "Endhendhi", "Muthyaalu", "Maamaa Neeku", "Maamaa", "Chitaaru" | Dubbed version of Pavunnu Pavunuthan | |
| 1992 | Chamanthi | Ilaiyaraaja | "Ide Rajayogam", "Chakkani Chikkani Chilaka", "Paala Ponge", "Kadale Neeku Thalli Thandri", "Kadali Meeda Ontariga", "Vanjaram - Bit" | Dubbed version of Chembaruthi | |
| 1992 | Roja | A. R. Rahman | "Chinna Chinna Aasa", "Nagamani Nagamani", "Na Cheli Rojave", "Paruvam Vanaga", "Chinna Chinna Aasa (Bit)", "Vinara Vinara" | Dubbed version of Roja | |
| 1992 | October 2 | M. M. Keeravani | "Shokame Lede Kalataku", "Ee Poota Meekanta", "Nee Tallevaro Tandrevaro", "Nenega Rachilakanta", "Janaganamana Ani Pade", "Abbailu Meeto", "Ammatodu Ammatodu", "Oh Manishi" | Dubbed version of Vaaname Ellai | |
| 1992 | Durgamma | Vijayanand | "Maama Majja Daaka", "Naa Batalone", "Maa Oori Konda", "Ee Ammani" | Dubbed version of Rasathi Varum Naal | |
| 1992 | Mande Suryudu | Deva | "Eay Oye Ayi Jummalaka", "Piliche Vayasu Palike Sogasu", "Choodu Choodu Oorantha", "Maataina Botaina Okatele Needi", "Mugdaraali Navve" | Dubbed version of Surieyan | |
| 1992 | Prema Poojari | Deva | "Oh Radha Oh Radha", "Idi Naa Aasayam", "Oh Krishna Oh Krishna", "Mandaram Mudda Mandaram", "Mava Mava" | Dubbed version of Unakkaga Piranthen | |
| 1992 | Hrudayam | Ilaiyaraaja | "April Maylalo", "Oosulade", "Hrudayama", "O Pilla Jaaji Mallira", "Poolathale Poochenamma" | Dubbed version of Idhayam | |
| 1992 | Gharana Inspector | V. Manohar | "Ayyayyo Chedipoindi", "Mucchataina Muddu Gumma", "Idhe Idhe Makarandle", "Aakasham Bhoomi", "Aakasham Bhoomi (Sad)" | Dubbed version of Police Lockup | |
| 1992 | Manmadhude Naa Mogudu | Ilaiyaraaja | "Nalo Ninne Nilo Nanne", "Dora Vayase", "Are O Ranga Jingi Chekka", "Cheppindi Cheyyi", "Gudivada Veedhullo", "Ponge Kalavarintale", "Gudivada Veedhullo - Sad" | Dubbed version of Singaravelan | |
| 1993 | Premalekhalu | Ilaiyaraaja | "Vayasa Brindaavanam", "Neeve Neeve", "Thagilindi", "Adho Megha Thoranam", "Siri Siri Malliya", "O Chirugali", "College" | Dubbed version of Eeramana Rojave | |
| 1993 | Gentleman | A. R. Rahman | "Naa Intimundunna", "Mudinepalli", "Chiku Buku Raile", "Mavele Mavele", "Kontegadni Kattuko" | Dubbed version of Gentleman | |
| 1993 | Muddula Baava | Ilaiyaraaja | "Kallone Vunnavule", "Addirabanna", "Yei Vannelannee", "Chinnari Naa Jaabili", "Sande Maatuna", "Penchavu Amma Naannaga", "Kallone Vunnavule - 1" | Dubbed version of Ponnumani | |
| 1993 | Allari Donga | Ilaiyaraaja | "Chinna Chinna Mata", "Jajimalli Nene", "Ginginakadi", "Jola Paata", "Veera Kottudulo", "Jaali Jaali", "Chakkani Janta" | Dubbed version of Ulle Veliye | |
| 1993 | Muta Rowdy | M. M. Keeravani | "Nene Neeku Raja", "Banti Banti Chamanti", "Naa Kannulake", "Arjunada ! Arjunada", "Ratiri Vela", "Padenu Oka Pata" | Dubbed version of Pratap | |
| 1993 | Love War | S. A. Rajkumar | "Premaku Nene", "Choopulu Kalisenuley", "Chakkani Chilakamma", "Padana O Pata", "Haho Kallallo", "Nuvve Naa Jeevana", "Once Up On Time" | Dubbed version of Mudhal Paadal | |
| 1993 | Nagini | Laxmikant–Pyarelal | "Murise Bangaru", "Prema Prema" | Dubbed version of Nagina | |
| 1993 | Repati Vartha | Adithyan | "Manmada Aasha", "Moondara Unnadi", "Pora Sombera", "Munipencha" | Dubbed version of Naalaya Seidhi | |
| 1993 | I Love India | Ilaiyaraaja | "Aahaa Challagaali", "Ningiki Nelaki", "Allari Oohala", "Kallaloni Velugu", "Kulike Vayasanta" | Dubbed version of I Love India | |
| 1994 | Donga Donga | A. R. Rahman | "Veera Bobbili Kotalo", "Kanulu Kanulanu", "Kotta Bangaru Lokam", "Aakatayi Okkadanta", "Konchem Neeru Konchem Nippu", "Eatilona Sepalanta", "Seetaaloo Nuvvuleka", "Thee Thee Theeyanee" | Dubbed version of Thiruda Thiruda | |
| 1994 | Director Gari Pellam | Ilaiyaraaja | "Ninne Kalavani", "Antaanu Okamaata", "Ee Vela", "Ide Nizam", "Naa Mano Veena" | Dubbed version of Marupadiyum | |
| 1994 | Gowramma Nee Mogudevaramma | Ilaiyaraaja | "Ee Bassule Subha", "Gorinka Venta", "Kosare Sangeetham", "Manase Aalapinchu", "A Gingaa Ginukule" | Dubbed version of Veetla Visheshanga | |
| 1994 | Indhu | Deva | "Metro Channel", "Daabakka Doobakka", "Jaaji Malle Andam", "Eah Sathyam Oreah Sathyam", "Cheppavaa Cheppavaa", "Gunthalakidi" | Dubbed version of Indhu | |
| 1994 | Aadavaallaku Mathrame | Ilaiyaraaja | "Bandakesi", "Chakkani Chilakalu", "Udyogaalu", "Aadadhi Ante" | Dubbed version of Magalir Mattum | |
| 1994 | Allari Bullodu | Deva | "Andam Chindi", "Nee Needevunnanu", "Vayyari Ra", "Are Paapa", "Ningiloki Vennlayi", "Super Super", "Nee Mate Naku" | Dubbed version of Kizhakke Varum Paattu | |
| 1994 | Bobbili Rayudu | Deva | "Manasa", "Sindura Puvvu", "Pilladhani", "Challanaina" | Dubbed version of Senthoorapandi | |
| 1994 | Premikudu | A. R. Rahman | "Mukkala Mukkabala", "Urvasi Urvasi", "Errani Kurrani Gopala", "Andamaina Premarani", "O Cheliya", "Mantapeta Malakpeta", "Gaali Tarangalu", "Alalavale", "Muttukunte" | Dubbed version of Kaadhalan | |

=== As music director ===
| Year | Movie | Director | Notes | Ref(s) |
|---|---|---|---|---|
| 1983 | Pelli Chesi Chupistham | Pendyala Venkata Rama Rao | Credited as Ramakrishna Raja | |
| 1992 | Venkanna Babu | Dasari Narayana Rao | Credited as Ramakrishna Raja | |
| 1993 | Mama Kodalu | Dasari Narayana Rao | Credited as Ramakrishna Raja | |

=== As writer ===
| Year | Movie | Story | Screenplay | Dialogues | Notes | Ref(s) |
|---|---|---|---|---|---|---|
| 1964 | Dongalu Doralu | | | Yes | | |
| 1965 | Sri Simhachala Kshetra Mahima | | | Yes | | |
| 1965 | Adhrusya Hanthakudu | | | Yes | | |
| 1966 | Pelli Pandiri | | | Yes | | |
| 1967 | Beedi Basavanna | | | | Kannada film | |
| 1968 | Pelli Roju | | | Yes | | |
| 1968 | Evaru Monagadu | | | Yes | | |
| 1968 | Bangaru Gajulu | Yes | | | | |
| 1970 | Basthi Kiladilu | | | Yes | | |
| 1970 | Sambarala Rambabu | | | Yes | | |
| 1970 | Yamalokapu Gudachari | Yes | | Yes | | |
| 1970 | Thedi Vandha Mappillai | Yes | | | Story credit; remake of Beedi Basavanna | |
| 1971 | Sri Krishna Devarayalu | | | Yes | | |
| 1971 | Mattilo Manikyam | Yes | | Yes | | |
| 1971 | Basthi Bull Bull | | | Yes | | |
| 1971 | Maa Ilavelpu | | | Yes | | |
| 1971 | Nenu Manishine | | | Yes | | |
| 1971 | Mary Matha | | | Yes | | |
| 1972 | Collector Janaki | | | Yes | | |
| 1972 | Sampurna Theerthayatra | | | Yes | | |
| 1972 | Vooriki Upakari | | | Yes | | |
| 1972 | Bullemma Bullodu | | | Yes | | |
| 1972 | Riksha Ramudu | | | Yes | | |
| 1972 | Kodalu Pilla | | | Yes | | |
| 1972 | Sabhash Vadina | | | Yes | | |
| 1973 | Ramude Devudu | | | Yes | | |
| 1973 | Devudamma | Yes | | Yes | | |
| 1973 | Pasi Hrudayalu | | | Yes | | |
| 1973 | Abimanavanthulu | | | Yes | | |
| 1974 | Kannavari Kalalu | | | Yes | | |
| 1974 | Chairman Chalamayya | | Yes | Yes | Co-wrote screenplay with Ramineedu Gutha | |
| 1974 | Tulabharam | | | Yes | | |
| 1974 | Jeevitha Rangamu | | | Yes | | |
| 1975 | Chaduvu Samskaram | Yes | Yes | Yes | | |
| 1975 | Aadadhani Adhrushtam | | | Yes | | |
| 1978 | Anukunnadhi Sadhistha | Yes | | Yes | | |
| 1978 | Nayudu Bava | Yes | | | | |
| 1978 | Patnavasam | Yes | | Yes | | |
| 1978 | Ramudu Rangadu | | | Yes | | |
| 1979 | Muddula Koduku | Yes | | | | |
| 1980 | Mahalakshmi | | | Yes | Co-wrote dialogues with Kodakandla Appalacharya | |
| 1982 | Bandhipotu Simham | | | Yes | Dubbed version of Ranuva Veeran | |
| 1988 | Sister Nandini | | | Yes | Dubbed version of Manathil Urudhi Vendum | |
| 1989 | Geethanjali | | | Yes | | |
| 1991 | Prema Bandhi | | | Yes | | |

=== As director ===
| Year | Movie | Ref(s) |
|---|---|---|
| 1975 | Chaduvu Samskaram | |
| 1976 | Nijam Nidhrapodhu | |
| 1984 | Rendu Kathala Katha | |
| 1987 | O Prema Katha | |
| 1994 | Satru Poratam | |

== Awards ==
- He won Nandi Award for Second Best Story Writer for Bangaru Gaajulu (1968)
- He won Nandi Award for Second Best Story Writer for Mattilo Maanikyam (1971)
