= I Love India =

- Poster
- Directed by: Pavithran
- Written by: Pavithran
- Produced by: Janaki G. K. Reddy
- Starring: R. Sarathkumar; Tisca Chopra; Shenbagam
- Cinematography: Ashok Kumar
- Edited by: B. Lenin; V. T. Vijayan
- Music by: Ilaiyaraaja
- Production company: Sri Sai Thejaa Films
- Release date: 14 October 1993
- Running time: 130 minutes
- Country: India
- Language: Tamil

I Love India is a 1993 Indian Tamil-language action film written and directed by Pavithran. The film stars R. Sarathkumar, débutante Tisca Chopra and Shenbagam. It was released on 14 October 1993, and failed at the box office.

== Plot ==
Diwakar, an Indian Brigadier, is charged to eradicate terrorism in Kashmir. Diwakar lives with his sister Anu. His neighbour Priya falls in love with him. One day, the terrorists kidnap Anu and they kill her thereafter. In the past, Diwakar promised Anu to marry Priya. To fulfil his sister's wish, Diwakar eventually marries Priya. But Diwakar cannot live happily as long as he does not eliminate the terrorists.

== Cast ==
- Sarathkumar as Brigadier Diwakar
- Tisca Chopra as Priya
- Shenbagam as Anu
- Manorama as Priya's mother
- Goundamani as Diwakar's uncle
- Puneet Issar
- Babu Antony
- C. S. Rao as Rao
- Kalidoss as Rosario
- Ramachandran
- Prasanth
- Jaya Prahasam
- John Babu in a special appearance
- Pallavi in a special appearance in a song
- Yamuna in a special appearance in a song
- Meeta Gupta in a special appearance in a song
- Shagufta Ali in a special appearance in a song
- Kavithasri in a special appearance in a song

== Production ==
After scoring back-to-back successes like Vasanthakala Paravai (1991) and Surieyan (1992), producer K. T. Kunjumon of A. R. S. Film International wanted to collaborate again with director Pavithran and actor R. Sarathkumar; they started a project called India Today. However Kunjumon left the project due to creative differences with Pavithran, the project was taken over by a different production house and was retitled I Love India. It was prominently shot in Kashmir.

== Soundtrack ==
The soundtrack was composed by Ilaiyaraaja, with lyrics written by Vaali. The song "Adi Aadivarum Pallaakku" is set to the Carnatic raga Madhyamavati.

Song	Singer(s)	Length
"Adi Aadivarum Pallaakku"	S. Janaki	5:58
"Engiruntho Ennai Azhaithathu"	S. P. Balasubrahmanyam, S. Janaki	6:11
"Kaatru Poovai"	S. P. Balasubrahmanyam, Minmini	5:58
"Kurukku Paathaiyile"	S. P. Balasubrahmanyam, Minmini	5:04
"Paasam Vaitha Mullai"	Ilaiyaraaja	5:02

== Release and reception ==
I Love India was released on 14 October 1993. R. P. R. of Kalki wrote that Pavithran made an omelette out of basic ingredients like Tamil culture, Indian culture and patriotism. According to Pavithran, the film failed at the box office, potentially due to the censor board making 14 cuts, and Tamil audiences feeling alienated by the abundance of Hindi dialogues. Pavithran had planned dubbed versions in English and Hindi, but those plans did not come to fruition.
