= Thirumoorthy =

- Theatrical release poster
- Directed by: Pavithran
- Written by: Pavithran
- Produced by: M. G. Sekar; S. Santhanam
- Starring: Vijayakanth; Ravali
- Cinematography: B. Balamurugan
- Edited by: B. Lenin; V. T. Vijayan
- Music by: Deva
- Production company: M. G. Pictures
- Release date: 11 May 1995
- Running time: 155 minutes
- Country: India
- Language: Tamil

Thirumoorthy is a 1995 Indian Tamil-language action film written and directed by Pavithran. The film stars Vijayakanth and Ravali, with Anandaraj, Rajan P. Dev, Manorama, Shenbagam, Senthil and Janagaraj playing supporting roles. It was released on 11 May 1995, and emerged a box office hit.

== Plot ==
Moorthy, a lorry driver, lives with his mother, Ramaatha. His ramshackle vehicle draws the ire of the RTO officer and his daughter, Uma. The RTO officer confiscates Moorthy's vehicle registration certificate and stops Govindan's lorry, sparking a confrontation. Govindan, a local criminal and Moorthy's arch-nemesis sends his goons to attack the RTO officer. However, Moorthy intervenes, defeating Govindan's men and safeguarding the RTO officer and Uma. Uma develops feelings for Moorthy and convinces Ramaatha to persuade her son to reciprocate her love. In exchange, Uma promises to return Moorthy's registration certificate. However, the plan is foiled when Uma's father intervenes. Moorthy and his friend Azhagesan devise a plan to retrieve the registration certificate. Disguising themselves as a lady doctor and nurse, they meet with Uma's father, get him intoxicated, and confiscate the certificate. Uma discovers Moorthy's disguise and confesses her love by kissing him.

As the by-election for their constituency approaches, Govindan announces his candidacy. Minister Sigamani attends the public meeting as the guest of honor. Tragedy strikes when Uma's father suffers a heart attack, but Govindan's men and party supporters block their path. Moorthy confronts them, demanding passage, but Uma's father succumbs to his illness. Enraged, Moorthy storms the stage, confronting Sigamani in front of the gathering. When Sigamani and Govindan visit Uma's father's corpse to pay their respects, Moorthy denounces them for their hypocrisy, exposing their true nature. Geetha, a journalist secretly records a conversation between Sigamani, a corrupt politician, and a group of foreigners, who are plotting to assassinate Wilson, a World Peace Award recipient, in exchange for a substantial sum. When Geetha is discovered, they attempt to capture her, but she narrowly escapes with Moorthy's help.

Moorthy learns about Sigamani's plan and is offered a bribe to support Govindan's candidacy. However, Moorthy refuses to collaborate with the corrupt Sigamani and Govindan, instead challenging them to an election. Despite facing opposition within his own party, Sigamani is determined to see Govindan run against Moorthy. As the election approaches, Sigamani and Govindan realize their party will likely lose and conspire to disrupt the by-election. Meanwhile, Moorthy marries Uma at Ramaatha's insistence. Sigamani orchestrates a plot to frame Moorthy for murder by placing Govindan's corpse in Moorthy's lorry. Moorthy is arrested, attacked in prison. Ramaatha visits Sigamani's residence, where she encounters Lakshmi, Sigamani's wife and her former employer. A shocking revelation unfolds where Sigamani had killed Ramaatha's toddler son in the past, prompting Ramaatha to flee with their infant child. Lakshmi, believing Ramaatha had killed her son, discovers the truth: her biological child, Moorthy, is alive. Sigamani arrests Ramaatha, intending to torture her into coercing Moorthy into revealing information about Geetha. Sigamani deceives Lakshmi, telling her that Ramaatha had indeed killed their son, further manipulating the situation.

Geetha rescues Uma and devises a plan to infiltrate Lakshmi's household. Uma disguises herself as a cook and gains the trust of Kannaiyan, the existing cook. She successfully confiscates a cassette containing a communication code number, which reveals a detailed plan to assassinate Wilson during the Independence Day flag-hoisting ceremony. Geetha and Uma, disguised as magicians, infiltrate the prison and inform Moorthy about the murder plot. Geetha also reveals the truth about Moorthy's parentage to Lakshmi, using a photo as evidence. Lakshmi discovers Sigamani's deceit and the truth about her son. Geetha publishes the murder plan in her newspaper, forcing Sigamani to alter his scheme. He resurrects Govindan, revealing that his murder was staged to frame Moorthy. Meanwhile, Ramaatha dies in prison due to starvation, enraging Moorthy. Moorthy escapes from prison, determined to avenge Sigamani.

Geetha submits evidence of Sigamani's crimes to the CBI. Govindan kidnaps him on a train. Moorthy pursues the train, and after a chase, rescues Wilson by killing Govindan. In the end, Moorthy learns that Sigamani and Lakshmi are his biological parents and Sigamani is finally arrested for his crimes.

== Cast ==
- Vijayakanth as Moorthy
- Ravali as Uma
- Anandaraj as Govindan
- Rajan P. Dev as Minister Sigamani
- Manorama as Ramaatha
- Shenbaga as Geetha, a journalist
- Senthil as Azhagesan
- Janagaraj as Uma's father
- Rajkumar as a corrupt police officer
- R. Sundarrajan as Geetha's brother
- Kitty as a CBI officer
- Sangeetha as Lakshmi
- Lakshmi Rathna
- Ennatha Kannaiya as Kannaiyan, cook
- Pasi Narayanan as Sigamani's partyman
- Omakuchi Narasimhan as Omakuchi Narasimman, a constable
- Tirupur Ramasamy as Ramasamy, Govindan's assistant
- Kullamani as Peruchaali, Moorthy's sidekick
- Karuppu Subbiah as Laila, Moorthy's sidekick
- Ram-Lakshman as Govindan's henchmen
- Chelladurai as Sigamani's partyman
- Pasi Sathya as Moorthy's fake wife
- Jyothi Meena as a dancer in the song "Thaka Thimi Tha"
- Kalyan as a dancer in the song "Thaka Thimi Tha"

== Soundtrack ==
The music was composed by Deva, with lyrics by Vaali. The song "Senguruvi Senguruvi" is set to Anandabhairavi raga.

Song	Singer(s)	Length
"Manjal Nila"	Rahini Santhanam, S. P. Balasubrahmanyam	4:42
"Masthu Masthu"	S. P. Balasubrahmanyam, S. Janaki, Chorus	4:23
"Namma Ooru"	Atha Ali Azad, Chorus	4:43
"Namma Thalaivar"	Mano, Chorus	4:12
"Senguruvi"	S. P. Balasubrahmanyam, S. Janaki	5:58
"Thaka Thimi Tha"	Suresh Peters, Annupamaa, Chorus	3:58

== Reception ==
R. P. R. of Kalki praised Krishna's choreography as the sole positive of the film.
