= Manathil Urudhi Vendum =

1987 film by K. Balachander

- Theatrical release poster
- Directed by: K. Balachander
- Written by: K. Balachander
- Produced by: Rajam Balachander; Pushpa Kandaswamy
- Starring: Suhasini
- Cinematography: R. Raghunatha Reddy
- Edited by: Ganesh–Kumar
- Music by: Ilaiyaraaja
- Production company: Kavithalayaa Productions
- Release date: 21 October 1987
- Running time: 147 minutes
- Country: India
- Language: Tamil

Manathil Urudhi Vendum (transl. The mind should be resolute) is a 1987 Indian Tamil-language drama film written and directed by K. Balachander. The film stars Suhasini, with Sridhar and Chandrakanth in supporting roles. It was released on 21 October 1987.

== Plot ==
Nandini, a nurse, is the sole breadwinner of her family with seven siblings where she has an elder sister and six younger siblings. Nandhini is a dedicated and caring nurse whom everyone is fond of. Once on her way back, she shares an auto with Sundari, and they later become friends and share the house on a half-and-half basis. In the hospital, she saves a woman attempting suicide and brings her home and later finds out that she is fond of movies. Later, a thief tries to steal something from their house, but he gets caught red-handed, and she gives a lecture of earning and self-worth and gives him some money and asks him to work hard. She manages her house through letter communication.

One day, Nandini's siblings, Ramesh and Vivek, go to Chennai to give a visit to her. They later learn that she divorced her husband, and she asks them not to say anything to their parents and other siblings. A reporter writes an article which portrays nurses in a bad light, and Nandhini along with other nurses, confront him. Nandhini and the reporter have a heated argument, and Nandhini leaves his house. The person to whom Nandhini gave money and asked to earn and becomes successful step by step and accidentally meets Nandhini at every stage. Nandhini thinks of marrying her sister to him, but much to her dismay her sister elopes with a former tenant of their home. Ramesh and another sibling have a fight regarding a political leader whom Ramesh is fond of and thinks of as his God, and during the fight the other sibling gets hurt, which infuriates Nandhini, who lashes out at Ramesh and asks him to earn on his own which makes him responsible. Ramesh pays his exam fees by selling old newspapers.

In a twist of events, Nandhini's divorce comes to light and her father dies of heart attack. It is also revealed that Sundari was serving as a mistress to a rich man as she is the sole breadwinner of her family. Nandhini stands as a pillar of support for Sundari. She matches her maid with the former thief, and they are seen to be happily accepting the proposal. Meanwhile, the politician who Ramesh had revered is imprisoned and self-immolates. Even then, Nandhini does not lose hope and continues her job and supports the family. The writer becomes fond of Nandhini and wishes to marry her. After some struggle, love blossoms between the two, and Nandhini meets Surya's parents. Sundari's master dies suddenly, and she is deprived of a job. She then finds a similar job for a high-profile celebrity at Delhi, and Nandhini continues to morally support her.

Meanwhile, Nandhini's ex-husband suffers from kidney failure, and Nandhini is his only match. She decides to donate her kidney to him in order to let him live for his current wife and child. This ruptures Nandhini's relationship with Surya as he accuses her of still having feelings for her ex-husband. After the kidney transplant is done, Dilip offers Nandhini a blank cheque with which she fills the earlier amount that she loaned from Dilip's father to help her sister free her husband from jail. She declares herself debt-free. Surya, seeing her genuine nature, reconciles with her and she is happy. It is found that Nandhini's boss Dr. Arthanari has committed himself 24/7 for doctor service and lied about being married for the past seventeen years. This inspires Nandhini to indulge herself completely into nursing service 24/7. Arthanari informs her that Surya was more worried about their sexual life after her kidney donation and does not appreciate her act of kindness like she earlier thought. She meets Surya and expresses her disinterest in marrying him and says she will always be a nurse, serving society. The film ends with Nandhini resuming her job and remaining the family's breadwinner.

== Cast ==
- Suhasini as C. Nandhini
- Sridhar as Surya
- Chandrakanth
- Aravind as Ramesh (Elango)
- Vivek as Vivek
- S. P. Balasubrahmanyam as Dr. Arthanari
- Ravikanth as Hospital ward boy
- Lalitha Kumari as Vasu
- Yamuna as Gnanasundari, Nandhini's sister
- K. S. Jayalakshmi as Jaya, Nurse
- Chithra as Chitra
- Krishnan as Gothandam
- Vasanth as Reporter (guest appearance)
- Charle as Patient (guest appearance)

Rajinikanth, Vijayakanth and Sathyaraj appear in the song "Vangaala Kadale".

== Production ==
Manathil Urudhi Vendum is K. Balachander's third film where "the daughter has to make sacrifices and take care of her family", following Arangetram (1973) and Aval Oru Thodar Kathai (1974). While assisting with the script for the film in 1987, Balachander offered Vivek an acting role in the film, which he decided to pursue thus made his acting debut in the film. Vivek recalling his experience on his first day of shooting: "I was asked to come running down the stairs. I did the shot to his satisfaction. But in doing so I hurt my toes. But I did not want to show it to him. But after a few minutes the blood was oozing from the wound. KB sir saw it and asked me immediately to attend to it". This was the acting debut of S. P. Balasubrahmanyam. Balachander initially recommended Ramesh Aravind to leave the film since his role was not substantial, and work on a venture with K. Bhagyaraj instead, to mark his debut in a leading role. Bhagyaraj's proposed film was later shelved, and Aravind returned to Manathil Uruthi Vendum. Vasanth worked as an assistant director. Vijayakanth made a special appearance, and charged no remuneration for doing so.

== Soundtrack ==
The music was composed by Ilaiyaraaja, with the lyrics written by Vaali. For the dubbed Telugu version Sister Nandini, all lyrics were written by Rajasri. The song "Kannaa Varuvaayaa" is set in Patdeep, a Hindustani raga, and "Kannin Maniye" is set to Mayamalavagowla, a Carnatic raga.

All lyrics are written by Vaalee; all music is composed by Ilaiyaraaja.

Tamil
No.	Title	Singer(s)	Length
1.	"Manathil Urudhi Vendum"	K. J. Yesudas	4:19
2.	"Kannin Maniyae"	K. S. Chithra	4:49
3.	"Kannaa Varuvaayaa"	K. J. Yesudas, K. S. Chithra	5:33
4.	"Aachchi Aachchi"	Mano, K. S. Chithra	3:06
5.	"Sangathamizh Kaviye"	K. J. Yesudas, K. S. Chithra	4:31
6.	"Vangaala Kadale"	K. J. Yesudas	2:52
Total length:			25:10

All lyrics are written by Rajasri.

Telugu
No.	Title	Singer(s)	Length
1.	"Vayyari Chilaka"	S. P. Balasubrahmanyam	2:52
2.	"Inthe Inthe"	P. Susheela	4:49
3.	"Krishna Raavela"	S. P. Balasubrahmanyam, P. Susheela & Chorus	5:33
4.	"Addari Needi"	S. P. Sailaja, S. P. Balasubrahmanyam	3:06
5.	"Aathma Balam Penchuko"	S. P. Balasubrahmanyam	4:19
6.	"Chandaname Neeve"	K. S. Chithra, S. P. Balasubrahmanyam	4:31
Total length:			25:10

== Release and reception ==
Manathil Urudhi Vendum was released on 21 October 1987, and Sister Nandini on 31 March 1988. The Indian Express wrote, "Manadhil Urudhi Vendum comes over like a badly written stage play. It is a hodgepodge of elements from several earlier films made by K. Balachander". Jayamanmadhan of Kalki, however, reviewed the film more positively, comparing it favourably to Balachander's earlier films. Balumani of Anna praised the acting of the star cast, music and cinematography and concluded saying this film is well-crafted to prove Balachander's determination.
