= Uyarndha Ullam =

1985 film by S. P. Muthuraman

- Theatrical release poster
- Directed by: S. P. Muthuraman
- Written by: Panchu Arunachalam
- Produced by: M. Saravanan; M. Balasubramanian
- Starring: Kamal Haasan; Ambika
- Cinematography: T. S. Vinayagam
- Edited by: R. Vittal; S. B. Mohan
- Music by: Ilaiyaraaja
- Production company: AVM Productions
- Release date: 27 July 1985
- Country: India
- Language: Tamil

Uyarndha Ullam (transl. Noble Heart) is a 1985 Indian Tamil-language drama film directed by S. P. Muthuraman and produced by AVM Productions. The film stars Kamal Haasan and Ambika, while Radha Ravi, V. K. Ramasamy and Y. G. Mahendran play supporting roles. It revolves around a spoilt heir who lavishly squanders his inheritance, bringing ruin to his life. The film was released on 27 July 1985 and failed at the box office.

== Plot ==
Anand is a spoilt young man whose parents died leaving behind a huge inheritance. He spends all his waking hours boozing and gambling with his friends. One such night, he ends up in a brawl with some rowdies, but a stranger Selvam comes to his rescue. Selvam beats up the rowdies and takes Anand back to his bungalow. A drunk Anand forces Selvam to spend the night in his house. However, the next day, he has no recollection of the previous night's events. His servant Mani and accountant Nagapillai come to Selvam's aid. In appreciation, Anand appoints Selvam as his Personal Assistant.

Anand happens to meet Nagapillai's niece Geetha and is instantly smitten with her beauty. Geetha notices that the house is in complete disarray due to the servants' lethargy; she rouses them spurs them into action. The house is restored to its former glory and an overwhelmed Anand employs Geetha as the caretaker of his bungalow. He confesses his love for Geetha to Selvam, who in turn relates to him the fate of his lover who is suffering from cancer and needs money for treatment. The soft-hearted Anand vows to support Selvam and provides regular financial assistance to treat the latter's lover. Meanwhile, Anand's constant drinking habit causes him to suffer from jaundice and the doctor warns him against consuming alcohol. Geetha stays with him day and night and helps him recuperate. She also successfully persuades him to give up drinking.

One day, Nagapillai announces that all the creditors are demanding their dues and there is no money left to repay them as Anand has squandered away all his wealth. He reaches out to his friends but none of them are willing to help him out. He now realises their true colours; understanding that the only way out is to sell his mansion and repay his debts, he consents to it. Mani invites Anand to his brother's wedding. At the event, Anand is shocked to see that the bride is none other than Selvam's lover. When he confronts her, she confesses that Selvam is an acquaintance from her past and she did him a favour by pretending to be his lover in order to trick Anand. Anand is devastated by Selvam's treachery, but the latter denies any wrongdoing and justifies his actions by hitting out at Anand's wasteful ways. After this incident, Anand loses all hope in humanity and almost breaks up with Geetha.

With the sale of his house underway, Anand and Nagapillai move to live in the slum. Nagapillai's sudden demise is the last straw for Anand, and he reverts to drinking. His current plight comes to Geetha's notice and she resolves to help him out of his misery. She secures a job for him as an auto rickshaw driver; a re-energised Anand uses this opportunity to gain a fresh start in life. Anand witnesses Selvam's ex-lover's suicide attempt; he saves her and inquires the reason for her sorrow. She confides that she has been shunned by her family due to her role in Selvam's scam. However, Selvam is leading a wealthy life, ready to marry a rich man's daughter. Anand intervenes in Selvam's grand plans and a fight ensues between him and Selvam's goons. Anand finally manages to halt Selvam's wedding and publicly exposes his scam. The latter realises his folly and decides to marry his ex-lover. Anand goes back to his simple life with Geetha.

== Cast ==
- Kamal Haasan as Anand
- Ambika as Geetha
- V. K. Ramasamy as Nagapillai
- Radha Ravi as Selvam
- Janagaraj as Mani
- Major Sundarrajan as Financier Karunakaran
- Y. G. Mahendran as Jambu
- Kovai Sarala as Sarasu

== Production ==
Uyarndha Ullam is the 50th directorial venture by S. P. Muthuraman. Haasan's bungalow shown in the film was a set built inside AVM Studios on the coast of 2 lakhs.

== Soundtrack ==
The music was composed by Ilaiyaraaja. For the Telugu dubbed version titled Jalsa Bullodu the lyrics for all songs were written by Rajasri. The song "Enge En Jeevane" is set in Pahadi raga.

Tamil tracklist
No.	Title	Lyrics	Singer(s)	Length
1.	"Engey Enn"	Vairamuthu	Ilaiyaraaja	5:02
2.	"Engey Enn" (duet)	Vairamuthu	K. J. Yesudas, S. Janaki	4:58
3.	"Kaalai Thendral"	Vairamuthu	P. Susheela	4:47
4.	"Ottachattiya"	Vaali	S. P. Balasubrahmanyam	4:32
5.	"Vanthal Mahalakshmi"	Vaali	S. P. Balasubrahmanyam	4:29
6.	"Enna Venum"	Vaali	S. P. Balasubrahmanyam	4:22
Total length:				28:10

Telugu tracklist
No.	Title	Singer(s)	Length
1.	"Dikkulani Pandenule"	S. P. Sailaja	4:30
2.	"Andaala Aamani"	S. P. Balasubrahmanyam, S. P. Sailaja	5:05
3.	"Em Kavalo Tinandra"	S. P. Balasubrahmanyam	4:07
4.	"Velase Mahalakshmiye"	S. P. Balasubrahmanyam	4:10
Total length:			17:52

== Release and reception ==
Uyarndha Ullam opened on 27 July 1985. Jayamanmadhan (a duo) of Kalki wrote Haasan tried his hand at comedy but felt Ambika was wasted. The duo praised Radha Ravi's character and auto chase in second half concluded it is as if the entire wedding meal is mixed together and thrown into the hand without any connection between tears and fistfights. Balumani of Anna praised acting, music, dialogues and direction. The film failed at the box office, though the producers came together with the lead actor and director again in 1987's Per Sollum Pillai.
