= The Gentleman (film) =

- Poster
- Directed by: Mahesh Bhatt
- Screenplay by: Mahesh Bhatt
- Based on: Gentleman by S. Shankar
- Produced by: Allu Aravind
- Starring: Chiranjeevi; Juhi Chawla; Paresh Rawal; Laxmikant Berde; Heera Rajagopal
- Cinematography: Jeeva
- Edited by: Sanjay Sankla
- Music by: Songs: Anu Malik; A.R. Rahman (unc.); Score: Shyam
- Production company: Geetha Arts
- Distributed by: Geetha Arts
- Release date: 18 November 1994
- Country: India
- Language: Hindi

The Gentleman is a 1994 Indian Hindi-language vigilante action film directed by Mahesh Bhatt and produced by Allu Aravind, starring Chiranjeevi, Juhi Chawla, Harish Kumar and Paresh Rawal. It is a remake of the Tamil film Gentleman (1993). Three of the songs were re-used without any change in tune or instrumentation, from A. R. Rahman's original compositions for the original Tamil version. It was commercially successful.

== Plot ==
Vijay (Chiranjeevi) owns a little agarbatthi making business. When he is not busy with this, he is a master thief who steals crores and crores of money in order to build and run a school where students can study freely to become doctors, lawyers, etc. The police, led by Inspector (Paresh Rawal), are always on his tail, but he is ever elusive. Finally, he is identified as the thief and is then confronted by Roshni (Juhi Chawla), who loves him. He tells her what his intentions are and how his brother Ajay Shrivaastav (Harish Kumar), committed suicide along with his mother because he could not pay the donations for medical school. Vijay is finally caught and convicted and when he is released from prison, his dream school opens. He marries Roshni, who has waited for him for a long time.

== Cast ==
- Chiranjeevi as Vijay
- Juhi Chawla as Roshni
- Paresh Rawal as Inspector
- Laxmikant Berde as Vijay's friend
- Harish Kumar as Vijay's brother
- Heera Rajagopal as Babbili
- Shrivallabh Vyas as Judge
- Kulbhushan Kharbanda as Minister
- Deepak Tijori as Sub-Inspector
- Ajay Rathnam as Inspector Ratnam
- Virendra Saxena as Public Prosecutor
- Ashish Vidyarthi as Vijay's lawyer
- Roja as item number "Chika Pika"

== Production ==
The Gentleman was a remake of the Tamil film Gentleman (1993), and it till date remains the last Hindi movie of Chiranjeevi.

== Soundtrack ==
Anu Malik was credited as the composer, though except for two compositions, every other track was sourced from Southern hits, predominantly A. R. Rahman's soundtrack for the film's original Tamil version, for instance, the song "Roop Suhana Lagta Hai" was taken from "Ottagathai Kattiko", while "Chik Pika Rika Boom Bole" was taken from "Chiku Buku Raile". "What is Love" samples the song of the same name by Haddaway.

The song "Jhoom Ke Dil Ne" (which is in the soundtrack but not picturised in the film) is the Hindi version of the Telugu song "Jummani Tummeda" from Mechanic Alludu, featuring music by Raj–Koti.

No.	Title	Lyrics	Music	Artist(s)	Length
1.	"Roop Suhana Lagta Hai"	Indeewar	A. R. Rahman (unc.)	S. P. Balasubrahmanyam, K. S. Chithra	4:45
2.	"Hum Apne Gham Ko"	Rahat Indori	Anu Malik	Vinod Rathod, Sadhana Sargam	7:43
3.	"Jhoom Ke Dil Ne"	Rajan Khera	Raj–Koti (unc.)	S. P. Balasubrahmanyam, K. S. Chithra	5:52
4.	"What Is Love"	Indeewar	Anu Malik	Alisha Chinai, Anu Malik	7:58
5.	"Aashiqui Mein Had Se"	Rajan Khera	A. R. Rahman (unc.)	Vinod Rathod, Sadhana Sargam	4:46
6.	"Chik Pika Rika Boom Bole"	Rajan Khera	A. R. Rahman (unc.)	Suresh Peters	5:27
