= Kanne Radha =

- Title card
- Directed by: Rama Narayanan
- Written by: P. Selvakumar
- Produced by: T. R. Srinivasan
- Starring: Karthik; Radha
- Cinematography: N. Balakrishnan
- Edited by: K. Gauthaman
- Music by: Ilaiyaraaja
- Production company: Charuchithra Films
- Release date: 14 August 1982
- Country: India
- Language: Tamil

Kanne Radha is a 1982 Indian Tamil-language romance film directed by Rama Narayanan, starring Karthik and Radha, with Vanitha and Raja in supporting roles. It was released on 14 August 1982. The film was dubbed into Telugu as Radha Madhavi and released on 29 November 1982.

== Plot ==
Radha is the daughter of Su. So. Vi. Sokkalingam, an influential businessman. Being a mischievous girl, she skips classes with her cousin Geetha to watch films. On one such incident Radha acts like she is pregnant, simply to get a free ride to the theatre. Radha and her friends run into Raja, a taxi driver, who is forced to drop the "pregnant" woman to the hospital. He then realises that she fooled him, but is impressed by her antics. Raja saves up money for the treatment of his doting elder sister, Vadivu, a blind woman. He later meets his long time friend Nataraj and joins as a driver in his house after saving Nataraj's father from some goons.

Raja and Radha keep running into each other, and he finally declares his love for her. The latter gladly agrees though she is unaware of his background. On the other hand, Nataraj who has fallen in love with Geetha, requests Raja to go in his place and reject the bride his father has seen for him. A reluctant Raja goes to the girl's house posing to be Nataraj, only to find out that the girl is none other than Radha. Dumbstruck yet overjoyed, Raja readily agrees and the wedding gets fixed. Nataraj pretends to be Raja's driver in order to marry Geetha. Before the wedding, Vadivu successfully undergoes eye transplantation. But to Raja's dismay, she forbids him to marry Radha. On being questioned she relates how many years back, Sokkalingam had married but abandoned her the next day. Raja however, insists that he use his marriage to exact revenge for his sister's situation.

After the wedding he refuses to accept Radha as his wife, leaving the marriage incomplete. This causes much heartache to Radha and her family. Their relationship is further broken when Raja's true identity (of being a taxi driver) is revealed, and Radha's parents insult him time and time again. Later, Sokkalingam offers him money to leave the house, to which Raja agrees. However he had other plans and accepted the money just to bring out Sokkalingam's atrocities. Deep down, Raja loves Radha and is waiting for the right time to tell her the reasons behind his actions. But she is heartbroken thinking that Raja loved her only for her money.

Why did Raja accept Sokkalingam's bribe? Will Sokkalingam realise his mistake and accept Vadivu? Will Radha ever realise Raja's true love for her? Will they reunite? This forms the intriguing second half of the story.

== Cast ==
- Karthik as Raja
- Radha as Radha
- Vanitha as Geetha
- V. K. Ramasamy as Siva gurunathan
- Thengai Srinivasan as Chockalingam
- Vadivukkarasi as Raja Sister Vadivu
- Raja as Nataraj
- Gundu Kalyanam as Cook
- Ramarajan (Uncredited)

== Soundtrack ==
The soundtrack was composed by Ilaiyaraaja. Lyrics in Telugu dubbed version Radha Madhavi were written by Rajasri. It is his 200th film as composer.

Tamil
No.	Title	Lyrics	Singer(s)	Length
1.	"Maalai Suda Kanne Radha"	Vairamuthu	S. P. Balasubrahmanyam, S. P. Sailaja	4:33
2.	"Kulunga Kulunga Ilamai"	Alangudi Somu	Uma Ramanan	4:27
3.	"Kottungadi Ketti Melam"	Vaali	Malaysia Vasudevan	4:11
4.	"Vaalai Paruvathilae"	Vaali	P. Susheela, S. P. Sailaja	4:19
Total length:				17:30

Telugu
No.	Title	Singer(s)	Length
1.	"Maatalone"	S. P. Balasubrahmanyam, S. P. Sailaja	4:33
2.	"Vintha Paruvaana"	S. P. Sailaja, Vasantha	4:19
3.	"Kottandehe"	G. Anand	4:11
4.	"Kuliki Kuliki"	Vani Jairam	4:27
Total length:			17:30

== Reception ==
Thiraignani of Kalki praised the acting of the star cast, especially Karthik and Thengai Srinivasan and also praised Rama Narayanan for his ability to make viewers laugh.
