= Nilaave Vaa =

1998 film

- Theatrical release poster
- Directed by: A. Venkatesan
- Written by: A. Venkatesan
- Produced by: Shoba Chandrasekhar; K. T. Kunjumon
- Starring: Vijay; Suvalakshmi
- Cinematography: R Selva
- Edited by: B S Vasu-Saleem
- Music by: Vidyasagar
- Production company: V J Film
- Distributed by: Gentleman Film International
- Release date: 14 August 1998
- Running time: 144 minutes
- Country: India
- Language: Tamil

Nilaave Vaa (transl. Oh moon, come to me) is a 1998 Indian Tamil-language romantic drama film directed by A. Venkatesan and produced by K. T. Kunjumon. The film stars Vijay and Suvalakshmi in the lead roles, while Sanghavi, Raghuvaran and Manivannan play other supporting roles. The film was released on 14 August 1998 and was a below average movie. The film's title is based off a song from Mouna Raagam (1986).

== Plot ==
Siluvai is the son of Cruz. They are Tamil Christians living in a fishing village in Kanyakumari District. In another town, Perumaal is the father to Sangeetha and Gauri. Sangeetha comes to the small fishing village and Siva is proposed (and later engaged) to marry her. However, Gauri falls in love with Siva's friend, and after hearing that Perumal does not want to accept the Hindu-Christian marriage, she decides to elope with her lover. This leads to the break-up of Sangeetha and Siluvai's love affair. However, Siva, upon hearing Siluvai's story, gives a great speech to the villagers and unites Siluvai and Sangeetha.

== Cast ==
- Vijay as Siluvai
- Suvalakshmi as Sangeetha
- Sanghavi as Filomina
- Jai Ganesh as Perumaal
- Vinu Chakravarthy as Cruz, Siluvai's father
- Raghuvaran as Siva
- Manivannan as Dubai
- Charle as Kilipas
- Sanjeev as Baasha
- Sriman as Laasar
- Latha as Sangeetha's sister
- Thadi Balaji as Kicha
- Alphonsa in a special appearance
- Jaguar Thangam in a special appearance
- A. Venkatesh in a special appearance

== Production ==
The film was jointly produced on Vijay's home banner and K. T. Kunjumon who was still reeling under the failure of Ratchagan (1997). Initially Rakshana was signed on as heroine but was subsequently replaced by Suvalakshmi. Mansoor Ali Khan had signed to be the villain in Nilaave Vaa, but the actor later returned the advance of ₹50,000 and took back his 40 days of call sheets.

== Soundtrack ==
The soundtrack was composed by Vidyasagar. The lyrics were written by Vairamuthu. The audio rights were acquired by Pyramid Audio and Divo

Track listing
| No. | Title | Singer(s) | Length |
|---|---|---|---|
| 1. | "Akkuthe Akkuthe" | Vidyasagar, S. N. Surendar, Gopal Rao | 4:37 |
| 2. | "Chandira Mandalathai" | Vijay, Harini, S. P. B. Charan | 4:43 |
| 3. | "Kadalamma Kadalamma" | P. Jayachandran, Vidyasagar, Sujatha | 5:06 |
| 4. | "Nilave Nilave" | Vijay, Anuradha Sriram | 5:30 |
| 5. | "Nee Kaatru Naan Maram" (solo) | Hariharan | 5:10 |
| 6. | "Nee Kaatru Naan Maram" | Hariharan, K. S. Chitra | 5:10 |
| 7. | "Onnum Onnum" | Arunmozhi, Swarnalatha | 3:49 |
| Total length: | | | 34:08 |

== Reception ==
Ananda Vikatan gave the film a score of 37 out of 100. D. S. Ramanujam of The Hindu wrote, "A love story cut out to suit the energetic talent of [Vijay], with the expected twists and turns, has been made worthwhile by the situations fashioned by director Venkatesan in V. J. Films' Nilaave Vaa". He also appreciated the cinematography. Two years after release, the producers were given a ₹5 lakh (equivalent to ₹23 lakh or US$23,000 in 2026) subsidy by the Tamil Nadu government along with several other films.
