= Kalloori Vaasal =

- Poster
- Directed by: Pavithran
- Written by: Pavithran; Ananthu (dialogues)
- Produced by: N. A. Sudhakaran; K. P. Unni Krishnan
- Starring: Prashanth; Ajith Kumar; Pooja Bhatt; Devayani
- Cinematography: S. Muthu Ganesh
- Edited by: B. Lenin; V. T. Vijayan
- Music by: Deva
- Production company: Aanand Associates
- Release date: 18 February 1996
- Running time: 135 minutes
- Country: India
- Language: Tamil

Kalloori Vaasal (transl. College gate) is a 1996 Indian Tamil-language teen romantic comedy film directed by Pavithran. The film stars Prashanth, Ajith Kumar, Pooja Bhatt, and Devayani. The film was released on 18 February 1996. It is the only Tamil film of Bhatt.

== Plot ==
Sathya and Vasanth are best friends since childhood. Kumaraswamy works under Sathya's mother and wants his daughter Pooja to marry Sathya so that he would be wealthy for the rest of his life. For this, he makes many tricks and pranks to make them walk together alone, to go for a ride, and many more. On Vasanth's birthday, Sathya goes to wish him, but he denies his wish and says his birthday means nothing to him anymore. Simultaneously, Sathya's mother decides that her son is to marry Pooja, and the engagement day arrives. Without informing her, when she enters the house as all the other guests did, Kumaraswamy insists that she wear the engagement saree. Knowing the situation, she leaves the place crying, and Sathya follows her. In the middle of the street, he shouts at her and asks her for the reason why she cannot marry him. She immediately shows her mangala sutra, which she has hidden from everyone and reveals that she is already married.

The flashback begins with Pooja and Nivetha being best friends from school. On the first day of college, Nivetha meets Vasanth and falls in love. Unaware of this, Pooja and Vasanth love each other. When Pooja discovers her friend's love for Vasanth, she decides to sacrifice her love. On Vasanth's birthday, she denied her love for him, and he forcefully married her. Seeing this, Nivetha kills herself before their eyes. Pooja separates from Vasanth, thinking that he was the reason for her friend's death.

After knowing this, Sathya goes on to have a fight with Vasanth. But after knowing the truth, Sathya decides to sacrifice his love for Pooja and decides to unite Vasanth and Pooja. On a cultural day when Sathya, Vasanth, and Pooja give a combined performance, the opposite gang led by Kumaraswamy plots against Vasanth and stabs him. The blame is then put on Sathya, who is jailed. When Pooja sees her husband get hurt, she forgets everything and starts to cry for him. When Vasanth regains consciousness, he and Pooja finally are reunited.

== Cast ==
Source (Note: The actors are not credited in the film. The cast order is based on the New Straits Times review.)

- Prashanth as Sathya
- Ajith Kumar as Vasanth
- Pooja Bhatt as Pooja
- Devayani as Nivetha
- Manivannan as Kumarasamy, Pooja's father
- Kalyan as Milton
- Kavitha as Sathya's mother
- Tiruppur Ramasamy as Ramasamy

== Production ==
During the production of the film, Prashanth was unhappy about the way that his character was depicted and his father Thiagarajan was involved in a spat with the director over the issue. Prashanth sported a ponytail for his role. This was the only Tamil film which Pooja Bhatt acted in. In an interview, Ajith mentioned that he became good friends with Bhatt, despite initially finding her "aloof". Choreographer Kalyan made his acting debut as a college rogue.

== Soundtrack ==
The soundtrack was composed by Deva. The track "Loyola College" also features in the 2025 Tamil film Coolie.

Track listing
No.	Title	Lyrics	Singer(s)	Length
1.	"En Manathai"	Vaali	Hariharan, Anuradha Sriram	5:20
2.	"Kiss Me"	Vairamuthu	P. Unnikrishnan, K. S. Chithra	4:42
3.	"Loyola College"	Vaali	Mano	4:36
4.	"Nilagiri"	Vaali	Mano, Swarnalatha	4:19
5.	"Super Hit"	Vairamuthu	Mano, Anuradha Sriram	5:36
6.	"Vanakkiliye"	Vaali	S. Janaki	5:00
Total length:				29:55

== Release and reception ==
Kalloori Vaasal was released on 18 February 1996. D. S. Ramanujam of The Hindu wrote, "The dances, songs and grudge contests director Pavithran has staked in Anand Associates Kalloori Vaasal, all to catch the eye of the younger audience, have not been matched by a fitting story". K. Vijiyan of New Straits Times wrote, "The attraction in this movie is not so much the story, which is not all that fantastic. It is the stars. If you like them, you will like the movie". The film did not perform well at the box office.
