= Kattradhu Kalavu =

- Theatrical release poster
- Directed by: Balaji Devi Prasad
- Story by: E. Kumaravel; Balaji Devi Prasad
- Produced by: Pattiyal Sekhar; Chehak Kapoor
- Starring: Krishna; Vijayalakshmi
- Cinematography: Nirav Shah
- Edited by: Kasi Viswanathan
- Music by: Songs: Paul Jacob; Score: Sabesh–Murali
- Production company: Talking Times Movie Pvt Ltd
- Release date: 28 May 2010
- Country: India
- Language: Tamil

Kattradhu Kalavu (transl. Learned thievery) is a 2010 Indian Tamil-language action film written and directed by Balaji Devi Prasad, an erstwhile advertisement filmmaker. It stars Krishna and Vijayalakshmi in the lead roles with choreographer Kalyan and Sampath Raj in supporting roles. The music was composed by Paul Jacob with cinematography by Nirav Shah and editing by Kasi Viswanathan. The film is based on con artists and is inspired by Bunty Aur Babli (2006), which itself is based on Bonnie and Clyde (1967). The film was released on 28 May 2010.

== Plot ==
Singam gets cheated out of an original idea of his by a prominent person in the society. He decides to stop pleading and start threatening. He begins with a plan to corner the big shot. He meets Krishnaveni, who has left home and needs money fast. With a common purpose, they soon become partners and work out a plan. They blackmail the big shot with videotapes that they threaten to release all over the media if he refused to pay up. Buoyed by the success of their maiden outing, they decide to become con artists. They are successful in various ventures and finally end up blackmailing a minister. The minister, after initially caving in to their threats, decides to settle scores. What happens next forms the rest of the story.

== Cast ==
- Krishna as Singam
- Vijayalakshmi as Krishnaveni
- Kalyan as Stanley Deva Sahayam
- Sampath Raj as Ramanathan
- Ganja Karuppu
- Chinni Jayanth
- V. M. C. Haneefa as Vaikavardhan
- Santhana Bharathi as Vaikavardhan
- Balu Anand
- Nellai Siva
- Mumaith Khan in an item number in "Azhagana Ponnuthaan"
- Swaminathan as the police inspector
- Lollu Sabha Easter
- Sai Dheena as Pottu

== Production ==
Krishna okayed the script after listening to thirty scripts. He also okayed a script titled Madras by Five Star Krishna but that film was delayed.

== Soundtrack ==
The music was composed by Paul Jacob and released by Sony Music India. The song "Azhagaana Ponnuthaan" is a remix of "Azhagaana Ponnu Naan" from Alibabavum 40 Thirudargalum (1956).

Kattradhu Kalavu

Soundtrack album by Paul Jacob
- Released: 2010
- Recorded: 2010
- Genre: Soundtrack
- Length: 20:19
- Label: Sony Music India
- Producer: Paul Jacob

Paul Jacob chronology
Kathai (2010)	Kattradhu Kalavu (2010)

Track list
No.	Title	Lyrics	Singer(s)	Length
1.	"Kattradhu Kalavu"	Blaaze, Dinesh Kanagaratnam	Blaaze, Dinesh Kanagaratnam	3:43
2.	"Indha Vaanam Indha Bhoomi"	Yugabharathi	Hariharan, Anuradha Sriram	4:47
3.	"Sudandhiram Sudandhiram"	Yugabharathi	Shakthisree Gopalan	4:39
4.	"Dhevaaram"	Paul. J	Yogeshwaran Maanickam, Puniyavathi Elangovan	2:57
5.	"Azhagana Ponnuthaan"	A. Maruthakasi	Sunandita	4:13
Total length:				20:19

== Reception ==
Bhama Devi Rani of The Times of India rated the film 2.5/5 and wrote, "It is a well-planned suspense story, on paper". Malathi Rangarajan of The Hindu wrote, "as emotions are only on a superficial level, Katradhu Kalavu, though racy, doesn't make the impact it ought to". A critic from The New Indian Express wrote, "Katradhu Kalavu will appeal to viewers who like to experiment with their viewing choices".
