= Kalyan (choreographer) =

Choreographer in India

- Born: Kalyan Kumar; Chennai
- Occupations: Choreographer; Actor; Producer
- Years active: 1987–present

Kalyan is an Indian choreographer, who has primarily worked on Tamil-language films. After beginning his career as a dancer and actor, he has gone on to choreograph songs in over two hundred films as a popular choreographer. He has also been a judge in the popular reality TV dance shows Jodi Number One and Kings of Dance for Vijay TV.

== Career ==
Kalyan began his career in the film industry as a dancer working with his great-aunt, Puliyur Saroja. He made his debut as a dancer in the film Per Sollum Pillai (1987) and then worked as an assistant choreographer with her in many popular Tamil films of the 1980s. He also became an actor and portrayed a negative role in the college drama film, Kalloori Vaasal (1996) featuring Ajith Kumar, Prashanth and Pooja Bhatt. He then played an antagonist against actor Vijay in S. A. Chandrasekhar's Maanbumigu Maanavan (1996), before moving on to work primarily as a choreographer. Since 1996, he initially worked as an assistant under various dancers such as Chinni Prakash, Thara, Tharun and Puliyur Saroja, before going on to choreograph songs in over 200 films. His first Tamil project as a main choreographer was Uyirodu Uyiraga (1999), and he made a breakthrough following his work in Dheena (2001). Kalyan has however continued to make acting appearances in films including Kattradhu Kalavu (2010) and Kannula Kaasa Kattappa (2016), which he co-produced. Kalyan has been a regular judge in the popular reality TV dance shows Jodi Number One and Kings of Dance for Vijay TV.

== Filmography ==
=== Actor ===
Year	Film	Role	Notes
1996	Kalloori Vaasal	Milton	
1996	Maanbumigu Maanavan	Madhan	
2001	Citizen	Police inspector	
2010	Kattradhu Kalavu	Stanley Deva Sahayam	
2010	Va	Sokkathangam	
2015	Enakkul Oruvan		
2016	Kannula Kaasa Kattappa		
2018	Koottali	Police inspector	
2022–2023	Jhansi		Telugu TV series
2022	Rathasaatchi	Devasahayam	
2024	Kadaisi Ulaga Por	Commissioner	
2025	Indra	Inspector Nagendran	
2025	Kiss	Williams	
2025	Revolver Rita	Master	

=== Dancer ===
Year	Film	Song	Notes
1987	Per Sollum Pillai	"Ammamma Vandathingu"	
1992	Thai Mozhi	"Singara Maane"	
1995	Baashha	"Naan Autokaaran"	
1995	Thirumoorthy	"Thaka Thimi Tha"	
1995	Asuran	"Vathikuchu Pathikuchu"	
1996	Thayagam	"Rangeela"	
1998	Moovendhar	"Chera Enna"	
1998	Sollamale	"Rathirida Roundadida"	
1999	Ethirum Puthirum	"Kathu Pasanga"	
1999	Sivan	"Rukkuthan Rukkuthan"	
1999	Azhagarsamy	"Orange Colour"	
2004	7G Rainbow Colony	"January Matham"	
2004	M. Kumaran Son of Mahalakshmi	"Tamizh Nattu Manava"	
2005	Aaru	"Nenjam Enum"	
2007	Chennai 600028	"Saroja Saaman Nikalo"	
2016	Chennai 600028 II	"Soppanasundari"	

=== Choreographer ===
- 1998 Uyirodu Uyiraga
- 2001 Dheena
- 2001 Dhill
- 2002 Thulluvadho Ilamai
- 2002 April Maadhathil
- 2002 Villain
- 2003 Dhool
- 2003 Kadhal Kondein
- 2003 Saamy
- 2003 Enakku 20 Unakku 18
- 2003 Anjaneya
- 2003 Ottran
- 2004 Ghilli
- 2004 Vasool Raja MBBS
- 2004 Arasatchi
- 2004 7G Rainbow Colony
- 2004 Attahasam
- 2004 Sullan
- 2004 Kovil
- 2005 Sukran
- 2005 Aaru
- 2005 Anniyan
- 2005 Ghajini
- 2005 Ayya
- 2005 Aaru
- 2005 Balu
- 2006 Paramasivan
- 2006 Pattiyal
- 2006 Pudhupettai
- 2007 Aalwar
- 2007 Chennai 600028
- 2007 Azhagiya Tamil Magan
- 2007 Malaikottai
- 2007 Kireedam
- 2007 Polladhavan
- 2007 Billa
- 2008 Kuruvi
- 2008 Yaaradi Nee Mohini
- 2008 Saroja
- 2009 Sarvam
- 2010 Aayirathil Oruvan
- 2010 Goa
- 2010 Kutty
- 2010 Tamizh Padam
- 2010 Darling (Telugu)
- 2010 Kattradhu Kalavu ("Sudandhiram")
- 2010 Uthamaputhiran
- 2010 Va Quarter Cutting
- 2011 Siruthai
- 2011 Mappillai
- 2011 Rowthiram
- 2011 Mankatha
- 2011 Mayakkam Enna
- 2012 3
- 2013 Biriyani
- 2013 Irandaam Ulagam
- 2015 Massu Engira Masilamani
- 2015 Vedalam
- 2016 Chennai 600028 II: Second Innings
- 2016 Kannula Kaasa Kattappa
- 2017 Vivegam
- 2018 Tamizh Padam 2
- 2019 Viswasam
- 2019 RK Nagar
- 2019 NGK
- 2019 Nerkonda Paarvai
- 2023 Thunivu
- 2023 Pichaikkaran 2
- 2024 Mareesan
- 2024 Inga Naan Thaan Kingu
- 2025 Vidaamuyarchi
