= Indhu =

- Theatrical release poster
- Directed by: Pavithran
- Written by: Pavithran
- Produced by: N. A. Sudhakar; K. P. Unnikrishnan
- Starring: Prabhu Deva; Roja
- Cinematography: Ashok Kumar
- Edited by: B. Lenin; V. T. Vijayan
- Music by: Deva
- Production company: Anand Associates
- Release date: 14 April 1994
- Country: India
- Language: Tamil

Indhu is a 1994 Indian Tamil-language dance film written and directed by Pavithran. The film stars Prabhu Deva (in his first leading role) and Roja, while Sarathkumar and Khushbu play supporting roles. It was released on 14 April 1994.

== Plot ==
Chinnasamy a.k.a. Pattas (Prabhudeva), Peter, Sottai, and Pazhani are daily wagers working in Pollachi market. One day, Pattas accidentally drops fish on Indhu (Roja) and she gets into tussle with them. After a series of tit for tat incidents, she becomes friends with them. She mentions that she is a rich girl but her father is working abroad and she is living her life alone in a hostel.

Veeraiyan (Ponnambalam) is a rowdy who terrorizes the market demanding mamool from petty shopkeepers. Soon it is revealed that Kasi (R. Sarathkumar) will be released from jail.

In the past, Veeraiyan brother impregnated Kasi sister and after marriage, Veeraiyan burned her when she resisted his molestation attempt.

Meanwhile, Indhu goes to her uncle's house in Madras after getting dismissed from college due to an incident.

The friends Pattas, Peter, Pazhani, and Sottai visit her uncle's house in Madras but are chased by their uncle due to a misunderstanding. Later her uncle's colleagues plan to sleep with her in return for helping her uncle.

She runs away and rowdies thrash the friends, Sottai dies and is cremated.

Whether Indhu and Pattas unite and whether Kasi takes revenge on Veeraiyan is revealed later in the film.

== Cast ==
- Prabhu Deva as Chinnasamy (Pattasu)
- Roja as Indhu
- Sukran as Antony Felix Peter
- Jawahar as Pazhani
- Rajkumar as Sottai
- Ponnambalam as Veeraiyan
- Santhiyarani as Jameela
- Kumarimuthu as Tea master
- Oru Viral Krishna Rao as Millworker
- Mannangatti Subramaniam as Kanakku
- Ennathe Kannaiah as Servant
- Kalidoss as Police inspector
- Krishnamoorthy as Police inspector
- Sarathkumar as Kaasi (guest appearance)
- Khushbu in a special appearance

== Production ==
The film marked Prabhu Deva's debut as an actor in the leading role, after he appeared as a dancer in several earlier films.

== Soundtrack ==
The soundtrack was composed by Deva. The lyrics were written by Vaali. The song Aeye Gnanam was inspired by R. D. Burman's Hindi song Jaana O Meri Jaana, sung by Kishore Kumar from the 1982 film Sanam Teri Kasam. For the dubbed Telugu version, all lyrics were written by Rajasri.

Tamil
No.	Title	Singer(s)	Length
1.	"Aeye Gnanam"	S. P. Balasubrahmanyam	3:33
2.	"Aeye Kuttii Munnal"	S. Janaki, S. P. Balasubrahmanyam	3:26
3.	"Eppadi Eppadi"	S. Janaki, S. P. Balasubrahmanyam	4:29
4.	"Kothamalli Vasam"	Mano, Minmini	4:13
5.	"Metro Channel"	S. P. Balasubrahmanyam, Malgudi Subha	5:06
6.	"Utta Lakkadi Sevatha Tholuthan"	Mano	4:46
7.	"Nagumo"	M. Balamuralikrishna	8:28
Total length:			34:01

Telugu
No.	Title	Singer(s)	Length
1.	"Metro Channel"	S. P. Balasubrahmanyam, Malgudi Subha	5:07
2.	"Daabakka Doobakka"	S. P. Balasubrahmanyam, K. S. Chithra	4:28
3.	"Jaaji Malle Andam"	S. P. Balasubrahmanyam, K. S. Chithra	4:20
4.	"Eah Sathyam Oreah Sathyam"	S. P. Balasubrahmanyam, K. S. Chithra	3:30
5.	"Cheppavaa Cheppavaa"	S. P. Balasubrahmanyam, K. S. Chithra	4:35
6.	"Gunthalakidi"	S. P. Balasubrahmanyam, K. S. Chithra	4:49
Total length:			26:49

== Release and reception ==
Indhu was released on 14 April 1994. The Indian Express wrote that, given Prabhu Deva's reputation as a dancer, the director "has been careful enough not to attempt any drastic change in the image of Deva. The film is hence dance-oriented with the storyline given a go by". R. P. R. of Kalki praised Prabhu Deva's dance and Sarathkumar's acting but panned Ashok Kumar's cinematography as out of focus and also panned the vulgar dialogues and lyrics. The film's release in Malaysia was marred by heavy censorship, with several fight scenes omitted.

== Dropped spin-off ==
It was reported that Pavithran was considering making a film titled Mookkuthi Kaasi featuring Sarathkumar's character from Indhu, and the project started in 1996. However Sarathkumar was ousted from the project soon after and replaced by Bhaskar Raj, who had appeared in Nethaji. The film, which would have also featured Khushbu and Roja, was later shelved.
