= Vaali (poet) =

Indian artist, poet, lyricist, writer, actor (1931–2013)

Padma Shri Vaalee
- Born: T. S. Rangarajan Iyengar; 29 October 1931; Thirupparaithurai, Srirangam, Tiruchirapalli district, Madras Presidency, British India
- Died: 18 July 2013 (aged 81); Chennai, Tamil Nadu, India
- Occupations: Artist; poet; lyricist; writer; actor
- Spouse: Ramani Thilagam (m. 1965; died 2012)
- Children: 1
- Writing career
- Period: 1958–2013

Thirupparaithurai Srinivasan Rangarajan, professionally credited by his pseudonym Vaali (29 October 1931 – 18 July 2013), was an Indian poet who has the record for writing the most songs in Tamil cinema. He is also recognised for a five-decade-long association in the Tamil film industry and wrote more than 15,000 songs. He acted in a number of films, including Sathya, Hey Ram, Paarthale Paravasam and Poikkal Kudhirai. He was honoured by the Government of India with the Padma Shri, India's fourth highest civilian honour, in 2007.

== Biography ==
Vaali was born in an Iyengar family as T. S. Rangarajan on 29 October 1931 to Ponnammal and T. Srinivasan Iyengar. His native place is Thirupparaithurai, Tiruchirappalli district. Growing up, he studied at Higher Secondary School for Boys, Srirangam, Srirangam till he finished his SSLC. He went to Madras in 1950 seeking an opportunity in the Tamil film industry. In the 1960s and 1970s, he received patronage from actor M. G. Ramachandran and became a successful lyricist, in competition with poet Kannadasan, which he had chronicled in his autobiography Naanum Indha Nootrandum. Vaali also authored other books such as Avathara Purushan, Pandavar Bhoomi, Ramanuja Kaviyam, Krishna Vijayam, Thamizh Kadavul, Kalaignar Kaviyam, Krishna Bhakthan and Vaaliba vaali. His song "Amma Endru Azhaikatha Uyir Illaiye" is carved in the stone in a temple in Trichy. He wrote songs for M. G. Ramachandran in 64 films and also for Sivaji Ganesan in 80 films. He wrote more than 15000 songs in Tamil films.

He died on 18 July 2013 in Chennai, following respiratory illness, at the age of 82.

== Awards ==
Civilian honours

- Padmashri in 2007

Tamil Nadu State Film Awards

Vaali is a five-time winner of the Tamil Nadu State Film Award for Best Lyricist

- 1970 – Engal Thangamm
- 1979 – Ivargal Vidhyasamanavargal
- 1989 – Varusham Padhinaaru and Apoorva Sagodharargal
- 1990 – Keladi Kanmani
- 2008 – Dasavathaaram

== Books ==
- Amma – 1976
- Avathara Purushan – 1995
- Naanum Indha Nootrandum
- Pandavar Bhoomi
- Ramanuja Kaviyam
- Krishna Vijayam
- Thamizh Kadavul
- Kalaignar Kaviyam
- Krishna Bhakthan
- Vaaliba vaali
- Poikkal kuthiraikal
- Nija Govintham
- Azagiya Singar
- Pennin Perundhakka Yavula
- Bhagavad Geethai
- Ninaivu Nadakkal
- Enakkul M.G.R.

== Filmography ==
=== As lyricist ===
==== 1950s–1970s ====
- 1959 – Azhagarmalai Kalvan
- 1961 – Chandrakanth
- 1961 – Nallavan Vazhvan
- 1963 – Ethaiyum Thangum Ithaiyam
- 1963 – Idayathil Nee
- 1963 – Karpagam - All songs
- 1964 – Dheiva Thaai
- 1964 – Padagotti
- 1964 – Thaayin Madiyil
- 1965 – Aasai Mugam
- 1965 – Aayirathil Oruvan
- 1965 – Anbu Karangal
- 1965 – Enga Veetu Pillai
- 1965 – Panchavarna Kili
- 1965 – Kalangarai Vilakkam
- 1965 – Panam Padaithavan
- 1965 – Thazhampoo
- 1965 – Kaakum Karangal
- 1965 – Vennira Aadai
- 1966 – Anbe Vaa
- 1966 – Chandhrodhayam
- 1966 – Major Chandrakanth
- 1966 – Motor Sundaram Pillai
- 1966 – Naan Aanaiyittal
- 1966 – Nadodi
- 1966 – Petralthan Pillaiya
- 1966 – Thaali Bhagyam
- 1967 – Arasa Kattalai
- 1967 – Adhey Kangal
- 1967 – Aval
- 1967 – Iru Malargal
- 1967 – Kaavalkaaran
- 1967 – Pesum Deivam
- 1967 – Selva Magal
- 1968 – Ethir Neechal
- 1968 – Galatta Kalyanam
- 1968 – Kanavan
- 1968 – Kannan En Kadhalan
- 1968 – Kudiyirundha Koyil
- 1968 – Oli Vilakku
- 1968 – Ragasiya Police 115
- 1968 – Ther Thiruvizha
- 1968 – Uyarntha Manithan
- 1968 – Chakkaram
- 1969 – Adimaippenn
- 1969 – Iru Kodugal
- 1969 – Nam Naadu
- 1969 – Nil Gavani Kadhali
- 1969 – Subadhinam
- 1970 – En Annan
- 1970 – Engal Thangam
- 1970 – Ethiroli
- 1970 – Enga Mama
- 1970 – Maanavan
- 1970 – Maattukara Velan
- 1970 – Thalaivan
- 1970 – Thedi Vandha Mappillai
- 1971 – Annai Velankanni
- 1971 – Kumari Kottam - 1 song
- 1971 – Neerum Neruppum
- 1971 – Babu - All songs
- 1971 – Oru Thaai Makkal
- 1971 – Rickshawkaran
- 1972 – Annamitta Kai
- 1972 – Idhaya Veenai
- 1972 – Naan Yen Pirandhen
- 1972 – Raman Thediya Seethai
- 1972 – Velli Vizha
- 1973 – Bharatha Vilas
- 1973 – Sollathaan Ninaikkiren
- 1973 – Suryakanthi
- 1973 – Ulagam Sutrum Valiban
- 1974 – Dheerga Sumangali
- 1974 – Netru Indru Naalai
- 1974 – Sirithu Vazha Vendum
- 1974 – Urimaikural
- 1975 – Anbe Aaruyire
- 1975 – Idhayakkani
- 1975 – Ninaithadhai Mudippavan
- 1976 – Bhadrakali
- 1976 – Naalai Namadhe
- 1976 – Needhikku Thalaivanangu
- 1976 – Oorukku Uzhaippavan
- 1977 – Aarupushpangal
- 1977 – Indru Pol Endrum Vaazhga
- 1977 – Meenava Nanban
- 1977 – Navarathinam
- 1978 – Achchani
- 1978 – Ilamai Oonjal Aadukirathu
- 1978 – Justice Gopinath
- 1978 – Mangudi Minor
- 1978 – Pilot Premnath
- 1978 – Sadhurangam
- 1978 – Sigappu Rojakkal
- 1978 – Vanakkatukuriya Kathaliye
- 1979 – Allaudinaum Arputha Vilakkum
- 1979 – Anbe Sangeetha
- 1979 – Annai Oru Alayam
- 1979 – Dharma Yuddam
- 1979 – Kadavul Amaitha Medai
- 1979 – Naan Vazhavaippen

==== 1980s ====
- 1980 – Kannil Theriyum Kathaikal
- 1980 – Natchathiram
- 1980 – Nizhalgal
- 1980 – Othaiyadi Paathayilae
- 1981 – Aani Ver
- 1981 – Agni Satchi
- 1981 – Kudumbam Oru Kadambam
- 1981 – Manal Kayiru
- 1981 – Mouna Geethangal
- 1982 – Enkeyo Ketta Kural
- 1982 – Gopurangal Saivathillai
- 1982 – Kanne Radha
- 1982 – Moondru Mugam
- 1982 – Nenjangal
- 1982 – Paritchaikku Neramaachu
- 1982 – Antha Rathirikku Satchi Illai
- 1982 – Pattanathu Rajakkal
- 1982 – Ranga
- 1982 – Sakalakala Vallavan
- 1982 – Thaai Mookaambikai
- 1982 – Thanikattu Raja
- 1982 – Thooral Ninnu Pochu
- 1982 – Thunai
- 1982 – Vaa Kanna Vaa
- 1982 – Vazhvey Maayam
- 1983 – Adutha Varisu
- 1983 – Kozhi Koovuthu
- 1983 – Miruthanga Chakravarthi
- 1983 – Neethibathi
- 1983 – Paayum Puli - 4 songs
- 1983 – Sandhippu
- 1983 – Saranalayam
- 1983 – Sivappu Sooriyan
- 1983 – Soorakottai Singakutti
- 1983 – Sumangali
- 1983 – Thai Veedu - 5 songs
- 1983 – Thanga Magan
- 1983 – Thoongadhey Thambi Thoongadhey
- 1983 – Vellai Roja
- 1984 – Anbe Odi Vaa
- 1984 – Anbulla Rajinikanth
- 1984 – Dhavani Kanavugal
- 1984 – Idhu Enga Boomi
- 1984 – Iru Medhaigal
- 1984 – Kai Kodukkum Kai
- 1984 – Kudumbam
- 1984 – Naan Mahaan Alla
- 1984 – Kuzhandhai Yesu
- 1984 – Madras Vathiyar
- 1984 – Madurai Sooran
- 1984 – Naalai Unathu Naal
- 1984 – Nalla Naal
- 1984 – Nallavanuku Nallavan
- 1984 – Osai
- 1984 – Sathiyam Neeye
- 1984 – Simma Soppanam
- 1984 – Theerppu En Kaiyil
- 1984 – Vaidehi Kathirunthal
- 1984 - Naan Paadum Paadal - 1 song
- 1984 – Vamsa Vilakku
- 1984 – Veetuku Oru Kannagi
- 1984 – Vellai Pura Ondru
- 1984 – Vidhi
- 1985 – Bandham
- 1985 – Deivapiravi
- 1985 – Kanni Rasi
- 1985 – Ketti Melam
- 1985 – Manakanakku
- 1985 – Mangamma Sabadham
- 1985 – Naan Sigappu Manithan
- 1985 – Nalla Thambi
- 1985 – Needhiyin Nizhal
- 1985 – Padikkadavan
- 1985 – Padikkadha Pannaiyar
- 1985 – Raja Rishi
- 1985 – Udaya Geetham
- 1985 – Uyarndha Ullam
- 1985 – Naam Iruvar
- 1985 _ Thanga Mama 3D
- 1986 – Anandha Kanneer
- 1986 – Annai En Dheivam
- 1986 – Dharma Devathai
- 1986 – Dharmapathini
- 1986 – Enakku Naaney Needhibathi
- 1986 – Lakshmi Vandhachu
- 1986 – Marumagal
- 1986 – Mella Thirandhathu Kadhavu
- 1986 – Mouna Ragam
- 1986 – Naan Adimai Illai
- 1986 – Nambinar Keduvadhillai
- 1986 – Oru Iniya Udhayam
- 1986 – Saadhanai
- 1986 – Samsaram Adhu Minsaram
- 1986 – Uyire Unakkaga - 2 songs
- 1986 – Vasantha Raagam
- 1986 – Viduthalai
- 1986 – Maaveeran
- 1986 – Thazhuvatha Kaigal - 4 songs
- 1987 – Anjatha Singam
- 1987 – Enga Chinna Rasa
- 1987 – Kavalan Avan Kovalan
- 1987 – Kudumbam Oru Koyil
- 1987 – Manathil Uruthi Vendum
- 1987 – Mupperum Deviyar
- 1987 – Oorkavalan
- 1987 – Paadu Nilave
- 1987 – Poo Mazhai Pozhiyuthu
- 1987 – Sirai Paravai
- 1987 – Veerapandiyan
- 1988 – Dharmathin Thalaivan
- 1988 – En Thamizh En Makkal
- 1988 – Guru Sishyan (1988 film)
- 1988 – Idhu Namma Aalu
- 1988 – Kaliyugam
- 1988 – Manamagale Vaa
- 1988 – Poruthadhu Podhum
- 1988 – Sahadevan Mahadevan
- 1988 – Sathya
- 1988 – Solla Thudikkuthu Manasu
- 1988 – Thambi Thanga Kambi
- 1989 – Aararo Aariraro
- 1989 – Apoorva Sagodharargal
- 1989 – Dharmam Vellum
- 1989 – Ennai Peththa Rasaa
- 1989 – Ponmana Selvan
- 1989 – Pudhu Pudhu Arthangal
- 1989 – Rajanadai
- 1989 – Siva
- 1989 – Thangamaana Purushan
- 1989 – Varusham 16
- 1989 – Vetri Vizha

==== 1990s ====
- 1990 - Michael Madana Kama Rajan
- 1990 - Arangetra Velai
- 1990 – Anjali
- 1990 – Ethir Kaatru
- 1990 – Keladi Kanmani
- 1990 – Kizhakku Vasal
- 1990 – My Dear Marthandan
- 1990 – Nadigan
- 1990 – Panakkaran
- 1990 – Puriyaadha Pudhir
- 1990 – Puthu Paatu
- 1990 – Raja Kaiya Vacha
- 1990 – Sandhana Kaatru
- 1990 - Jagathalaprathapan
- 1990 – Sirayil Pootha Sinna Malar
- 1990 – Unnai Solli Kutramillai
- 1990 – Vaazhkai Chakkaram
- 1990 – Velai Kidaichuduchu
- 1991 – Ayul Kaithi
- 1991 – Bramma
- 1991 – Chinna Thambi
- 1991 – Eeramana Rojave
- 1991 – Gnana Paravai
- 1991 – Gopura Vasalile
- 1991 – Guna
- 1991 – Idhayam
- 1991 – Kizhakku Karai
- 1991 – Maanagara Kaaval
- 1991 – Nee Pathi Naan Pathi
- 1991 – Rudhra
- 1991 – Thaipoosam
- 1991 – Thalapathi
- 1991 – Thalattu Ketkuthamma
- 1992 – Thilagam
- 1992 – Chembaruthi
- 1992 – Chinna Marumagal
- 1992 – Deiva Vaakku
- 1992 – Mannan
- 1992 – Meera
- 1992 – Naangal
- 1992 – Nadodi Pattukkaran
- 1992 – Oorpanchayathu
- 1992 – Senthamizh Paattu
- 1992 – Singaravelan
- 1992 – Suriyan
- 1992 – Thevar Magan
- 1992 – Unna Nenachen Pattu Padichen
- 1992 – Vanna Vanna Pookkal
- 1993 – Chinna Jameen
- 1993 – Chinna Kannamma
- 1993 – Chinna Mapillai
- 1993 – Dharmaseelan
- 1993 – I Love India
- 1993 – Kalaignan
- 1993 – Karpagam Vanthachu
- 1993 – Kathirukka Neramillai
- 1993 – Maharasan
- 1993 – Manichitrathazhu (Malayalam)
- 1993 – Marupadiyum
- 1993 – Senthoorapandi
- 1993 - Uzhavan
- 1993 - Gentleman - 1 song
- 1993 – Ulle Veliye
- 1993 – Uzhaippali
- 1993 – Valli
- 1993 – Walter Vetrivel
- 1993 – Yejaman
- 1994 – Adharmam
- 1994 – En Aasai Machan
- 1994 – Indhu
- 1994 – Kaadhalan
- 1994 – Kanmani
- 1994 – Mahanadhi
- 1994 – Mogamul
- 1994 – Priyanka
- 1994 – Raasa Magan
- 1994 – Rasigan
- 1994 – Seeman
- 1994 – Senthamizh Selvan
- 1994 – Veera
- 1994 – Veetla Visheshanga
- 1994 – Watchman Vadivel
- 1995 – Aanazhagan
- 1995 – Aasai
- 1995 – Chandralekha
- 1995 – Chinna Vathiyar
- 1995 – Deva (film)
- 1995 – Kattumarakaran
- 1995 – Kolangal
- 1995 – Mr. Madras
- 1995 – Muthu Kaalai
- 1995 – Oru Oorla Oru Rajakumari
- 1995 – Periya Kudumbam
- 1995 – Raasaiyya
- 1995 – Ragasiya Police
- 1995 – Rajavin Parvaiyile
- 1995 – Sathi Leelavathi
- 1995 – Thirumoorthy
- 1995 – Thotta Chinungi
- 1996 – Coimbatore Mappillai
- 1996 – Indian
- 1996 – Kadhal Desam
- 1996 – Kalloori Vaasal
- 1996 – Maanbumigu Maanavan
- 1996 – Mr. Romeo
- 1996 – Nethaji
- 1996 – Poovarasan
- 1996 – Poove Unakkaga
- 1996 – Selva
- 1996 – Tata Birla
- 1996 – Vaanmathi
- 1997 – Bharathi Kannamma
- 1997 – Thambi Durai
- 1997 – Vaimaye Vellum
- 1998 – Kadhala Kadhala
- 1998 – Marumalarchi
- 1998 – Ninaithen Vandhai
- 1999 – Kadhalar Dhinam
- 1999 – Manam Virumbuthe Unnai
- 1999 – Mannavaru Chinnavaru

==== 2000s ====
- 2000 – Hey Ram
- 2000 – Pennin Manathai Thottu
- 2000 – Priyamaanavale
- 2000 – Simmasanam
- 2000 – Vanna Thamizh Pattu
- 2001 – Chocolate
- 2001 – Dheena
- 2001 – Dhosth (Malayalam)
- 2001 – Looty
- 2001 – Middle Class Madhavan
- 2001 – Minnale
- 2001 – Narasimma
- 2001 – Parthale Paravasam
- 2002 – Baba
- 2002 – Bhagavathi
- 2002 – Kadhal Virus
- 2002 – Mounam Pesiyadhe
- 2002 – Punnagai Desam
- 2002 – Shree
- 2002 – Thenkasi Pattanam
- 2002 – Youth
- 2003 – Boys
- 2003 – Dum
- 2003 – Lesa Lesa
- 2003 – Pudhiya Geethai
- 2004 – Kuthu
- 2004 – M. Kumaran Son of Mahalakshmi
- 2004 – Manmadhan
- 2004 – New
- 2004 - Desam (Tamil Version)
- 2005 – Anbe Aaruyire
- 2005 – Chandramukhi
- 2005 – Chidambarathil Oru Appasamy
- 2005 – Ghajini
- 2005 – Mannin Maindhan
- 2005 – Mumbai Xpress
- 2005 – Oru Naal Oru Kanavu
- 2006 – Kalvanin Kadhali
- 2006 – Sillunu Oru Kaadhal
- 2006 – Vallavan
- 2007 – Aalwar
- 2007 – Azhagiya Thamizh Magan
- 2007 – Billa
- 2007 – Chennai 600028
- 2007 – En Uyirinum Melana
- 2007 – Inimey Nangathan
- 2007 – Kaalai
- 2007 – Sivaji
- 2007 – Thottal Poo Malarum
- 2007 – Unnale Unnale
- 2008 – Dasavathaaram
- 2008 – Dhanam
- 2008 – Bommalattam (dubbed)
- 2008 – Jayam Kondaan
- 2008 – Kuselan
- 2008 – Sakkarakatti
- 2008 – Saroja
- 2008 – Silambattam
- 2008 – Singakutty
- 2009 – Aadhavan
- 2009 – Arundhathi
- 2009 – Jagan Mohini
- 2009 – Kunguma Poovum Konjum Puravum
- 2009 – Malai Malai
- 2009 – Mathiya Chennai
- 2009 – Naadodigal
- 2009 – Naan Kadavul
- 2009 – Panchamirtham
- 2009 – Vaalmiki

==== 2010s ====
- 2010 – Agarathi
- 2010 – Baana Kaathadi
- 2010 – Chikku Bukku
- 2010 – Goa
- 2010 – Guru Sishyan
- 2010 – Kadhalukku Maranamillai
- 2010 – Leelai
- 2010 – Maanja Velu
- 2010 – Nanda Nanditha
- 2010 – Pen Singam
- 2010 – Sura
- 2010 – Theeratha Vilayattu Pillai
- 2010 – Thottuppaar
- 2010 – Valiban Sutrum Ulagam
- 2010 – Viruthagiri

==== 2011s ====
- 2011 – Aadu Puli
- 2011 – Engeyum Kaadhal
- 2011 – Kandaen
- 2011 – Mankatha
- 2011 – Maveeran
- 2011 – Osthe - 2 songs
- 2011 – Ponnar Shankar
- 2011 – Sattapadi Kutram
- 2011 – Uyarthiru 420
- 2011 – Vedi

==== 2012s ====
- 2012 – Aadhalal Kadhal Seiveer
- 2012 – Mirattal
- 2012 – Podaa Podi
- 2012 – Thadaiyara Thakka
- 2013 – Alex Pandian
- 2013 – Ethir Neechal
- 2013 – Kanna Laddu Thinna Aasaiya
- 2013 – Thillu Mullu
- 2013 – Udhayam NH4
- 2013 – Biriyani (posthumous)
- 2013 – Endrendrum Punnagai (posthumous)
- 2013 – Maryan (posthumous)
- 2014 – Kaaviya Thalaivan (posthumous)
- 2014 – Kochadaiyaan (posthumous)
- 2014 – Naan Than Bala posthumous)
- 2014 – Ninaivil Nindraval (posthumous)
- 2014 – Pannaiyarum Padminiyum (posthumous)
- 2014 – Ramanujan (posthumous)
- 2014 – Thirudan Police (posthumous)
- 2014 – Yaan (posthumous)
- 2026 - Dorothy (posthumous)

=== As actor ===
Films

- 1983 – Poikkal Kudhirai
- 1988 – Sathya
- 2000 – Hey Ram
- 2001 – Paarthale Paravasam
- 2002 – Kadhal Virus

Television

- Kaialavu Manasu

=== As writer ===
- 1974 – Kaliyuga Kannan
- 1976 - Oru Kodiyil Iru Malargal
- 1976 - Adhirshtam Azhaikkirathu
- 1976 - Muthana Muthallavo
- 1978 - Chittu Kuruvi
- 1979 – Kadavul Amaitha Medai – Screenplay, Dialogues
- 1980 - Vaira Kreedam
- 1983 – Magudi
- 1987 – Ore Oru Gramathile
- 1988 – En Thamizh En Makkal
- 1990 – Pengal Veettin Kangal (dialogues only)

=== Television ===
- 1997 Kaialavau Manasu
- 2003 Vikaramadhithan
- 2003 Imsai Arasigal
- 2008 Thangamana Purushan
- 2012 Amudha Oru Aacharyakuri

== List of songs ==
List of Vaali songs
Year	Film	Songs	Composer
1958	Azhagarmalai Kalvan	"Nilavum Tharaiyum"	B. Gopalam
1965	Aayirathil Oruvan	"Aadamal"; "Paruvam Enadhu"; "Unnai Naan"; "Yaen Endra"	Viswanathan-Ramamoorthy
1966	Anbe Vaa	all songs	M. S. Viswanathan
1968	Oli Vilakku	all songs	M. S. Viswanathan
1970	En Annan	"Kannukku Theriyadha"	K. V. Mahadevan
1982	Ranga	all songs	Shankar-Ganesh
1983	Poikkal Kudhirai	all songs	M. S. Viswanathan
1985	Udaya Geetham	all songs	Ilayaraja
1987	Ore Oru Gramathiley	all songs	Ilayaraja
1988	Sathyaa	all songs	Ilayaraja
1988	Agni Natchathiram	all songs	Ilayaraja
1989	Pudhu Pudhu Arthangal	all songs	Ilayaraja
1990	Anjali	all songs	Ilayaraja
1990	Chatriyan	all songs	Ilayaraja
1993	Varavu Ettana Selavu Pathana	all songs	Ilayaraja
1993	Maravan	all songs	Deva
1996	Kadhal Desam	all songs	A.R. Rahman
2001	Paarthale Paravasam	"Nee Than En"; "Adhisaya Thirumanam"; "moondrezhuthu"; "love check"; "Manmadha maasam"	A. R. Rahman
2005	Mumbai Express	all songs	Ilayaraja
2013	Thillu Mullu	"Kai Pesi"	Yuvan Shankar Raja & MSV
2013	Ethir Neechal	"Ethir Neechal Adi"	Anirudh Ravichandar
2014	Ninaivil Nindraval	all songs	D. Imman
2014	Yaan	"Hey lamba"	Harris Jayaraj
2014	Pannaiyarum Padminiyum	"Onakkaga Poranthaenae"; "Pesuraen Pesuraen"; "Enakkaaga Poranthaayae"	Justin Prabhakaran
