= Ore Oru Gramathiley =

- VCD cover
- Directed by: K. Jyothi Pandian
- Based on: Gandhi Gramam by Vaali
- Produced by: S. Rangarajan
- Starring: Lakshmi; Nizhalgal Ravi
- Cinematography: Rangaa
- Edited by: T. K. Rajan
- Music by: Ilaiyaraaja
- Production company: Aries Enterprises
- Release date: 14 December 1987
- Country: India
- Language: Tamil

Ore Oru Gramathiley (transl. Once upon a time in a village) is a 1987 Indian Tamil-language film directed by K. Jyothi Pandian. The film stars Lakshmi and Nizhalgal Ravi. Based on the play Gandhi Gramam (transl. Gandhi Village) by Vaali, it revolves around a collector who manipulates her caste certificate to get a government job.

The film became controversial for criticising caste based reservations, but was later cleared for release by the Supreme Court of India following changes in the climax, and won the National Film Award for Best Film on Other Social Issues.

== Plot ==
Gayathri is a Brahmin girl. Her father wants her to study IAS as per the wish of her deceased mother. But he worries whether Gayathri will succeed in exams because of the reservation policy and since she is a Brahmin girl, she will have no reservation and she has to secure more marks. He seeks opinion from the Tahsildar who is a well wisher of Gayathri's family because Gayathri's grandfather only helped him to study . So the Tahsildar devises a plan. He renames Gayathri to Karupayee and creates a false backward class certificate for her and enrolls her in a home for backward class in a remote area. He tells Gayathri's father not to reveal that Gayathri is his daughter. Few years pass by and Gayathri becomes a collector. She does good to the people and is a well respected woman. One day, an old servant of the Tahsildar who knows the truth about Gayathri, comes and demands for money from Gayathri. He blackmails that he will reveal the forgery done by Gayathri upon failure to pay up. Gayathri gives him money whenever he demands. One day Gayathri gets angry and doesn't give him money. So the servant gets angry and complains to the police about Gayathri's forgery. Gayathri is arrested and a case is framed on her for forgery even though the people of the locality support her. Gayathri reveals in the court that people from her community are poor but are denied the opportunities because of her community. The judge says that it is not fair and sentences them to 3 years in prison for forging certificate to get benefits.

== Cast ==
- Lakshmi as Gayathri / Karuppayi
- Nizhalgal Ravi
- Poornam Viswanathan as Shankara Sastri
- Charle
- V. K. Ramasamy
- Vinu Chakravarthy
- Delhi Ganesh
- Senthil
- Kamala Kamesh
- Manorama

== Soundtrack ==
The soundtrack was composed by Ilaiyaraaja.

Song	Singers	Lyrics
"Vanthirichu"	Gangai Amaran	Vaali
"Rettaikiligal"	K. J. Yesudas, K. S. Chithra	Vaali
"Padichu Ennatha"	Ilaiyaraaja, S. P. Sailaja	Vaali
"Ore Oru Gramathiley"	Malaysia Vasudevan	Vaali
"Ola Kudisaiyile"	S. Janaki	Vaali
"Jaathi Ennada"	Malaysia Vasudevan	Vaali
"Nallathor Veenai"	K. S. Chithra	Bharathiyar

== Reception ==
C. V. Aravind of The Indian Express praised the film for having a "novel theme", but said the comedy track was "not up to the mark".

== Controversies ==
Ore Oru Gramathiley was initially banned for criticising caste based reservations. The Supreme Court of India later allowed its release, after the producer agreed to make changes in the climax. After it won the National Film Award for Best Film on Other Social Issues, a writ plea to have the award nullified was made in the High Court. The plaintiff argued that the conferment of the award should be deemed "illegal" since the film was screened for the jury even before the ban was lifted by the Supreme Court. Ultimately, his efforts were fruitless.

== See also ==
- List of films banned in India
