= Pavithran (Tamil film director) =

Indian film director

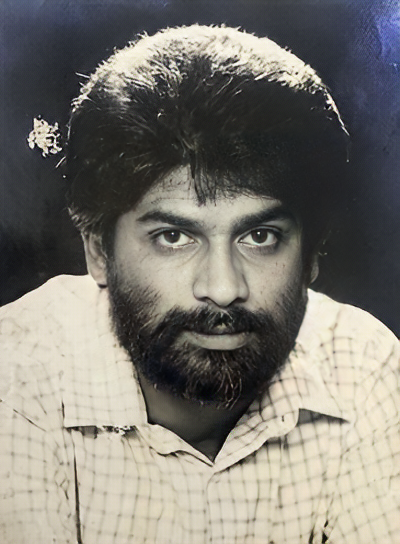
- Born: A. N. Pavithran; India
- Occupation: Director
- Years active: 1981–present
- Spouse: Deeja Pavithran

Pavithran is an Indian film director, who has made many hit Tamil films. He was active primarily in the 1990s collaborating in ventures which often included Sarathkumar in pivotal roles. He was awarded the Tamil Nadu state Kalaimamani award for his works in the film industry. He is known to have made his assistants and the actors he introduced huge stars in the film Industry. His assistant film directors include S. Shankar, A. Venkatesh, Balaji Sakthivel, Vincent Selva, Saravana Subbiah and many more. He has also introduced stars like Prabhu Deva. During the 1990s his movies with newcomers like Sarathkumar, Ajith Kumar, and Vijay, helped them become established actors in the industry.

== Career ==
Pavithran a student of Pachaiyappa's college began his career with K. T. Kunjumon's production venture Vasanthakala Paravai (1991), before going on to make a successful action film with Sarathkumar titled Surieyan (1992) which went on to become the biggest hit of the year, cementing his position in Tamil cinema and then re-collaborated with the actor the following year with I Love India (1993). Sarathkumar also featured in his next, the romantic musical Indhu (1994), which marked the debut of Prabhu Deva as a lead actor. In 1995, he made another action film with Vijayakanth titled Thirumoorthy.

He then made the college love story Kalloori Vaasal (1996) featuring Ajith Kumar, Prashanth and Pooja Bhatt, though the film opened to a negative response from critics and at the box office. During the making of the film, the director clashed with actor Prashanth and his father, with the pair claiming that Pavithran had changed the characterisation of Prashanth's role in the film since the first narration. In 1996, he also produced the Vijay-starrer Selva directed by A. Venkatesh, but the film's failure cost Pavithran 1.5 crore rupees. This also affected the making of his next venture titled Mookkuththi Kaasi, which started with Sarathkumar, but was later filmed with Bhaskar Raj in the lead instead. The film subsequently failed to develop and did not release. His final Tamil film before an extended sabbatical was the Vignesh-starrer Kadhal Palli. He made his debut in Telugu with Hello...Yama! (1999), which was a remake of the Kannada film of the same name.

In 2000, he announced a project titled Pugazh again with Sarathkumar, Poonam Singar and Sanghavi, but the project failed to proceed after initial schedules. The firm had been partially shot in Fiji with the story inspired by the 2000 Fijian coup d'état. He re-began work on the film in March 2004 with actor Jai and Sherin also brought in alongside Sarathkumar, but the film still failed to be completed.

Pavithran began work on a low budget film titled Mattuthavani in 2007, though delays meant that the film only had a low key release in 2012. In 2018, he released another small-budget film titled Dharavi, shot in Mumbai.

== Filmography ==
- Note: although he was always uncredited as a producer, his company A. R. S. (Film) International is credited for producing some films.

Year	Film	Credited as		Language	Notes
Year	Film	Director	Producer	Language	Notes
1991	Vasanthakala Paravai	Yes	Yes	Tamil	
1992	Suriyan	Yes	Yes	Tamil	
1993	I Love India	Yes	No	Tamil	
1994	Indhu	Yes	No	Tamil	
1995	Thirumoorthy	Yes	No	Tamil	
1996	Kalloori Vaasal	Yes	No	Tamil	
1996	Selva	No	Yes	Tamil	
1997	Kadhal Palli	Yes	No	Tamil	
1999	Hello...Yama!	Yes	No	Telugu	
2012	Mattuthavani	Yes	Yes	Tamil	
2018	Dharavi	Yes	Yes	Tamil	
2024	Karki Nanu BA, LLB	Yes	No	Kannada	
