= Vasanthakala Paravai =

1991 film by Pavithran

- Theatrical release poster
- Directed by: Pavithran
- Written by: Pavithran
- Produced by: K. T. Kunjumon
- Starring: Ramesh Aravind; Sarathkumar; Sudha Rani
- Cinematography: Ashok Kumar
- Edited by: B. Lenin; V. T. Vijayan
- Music by: Deva
- Production company: A. R. S. Film International
- Release date: 19 September 1991
- Country: India
- Language: Tamil

Vasanthakala Paravai (transl. Spring Bird) is a 1991 Indian Tamil-language romantic drama film written and directed by Pavithran in his debut. It stars Ramesh Aravind, Sarathkumar and Sudha Rani. The film, produced by K. T. Kunjumon and scored by Deva, was released on 19 September 1991. Deva won the Cinema Express Award for Best Music Director.

== Plot ==
Ravi, a shopkeeper, falls in love with Uma, a student, who belongs to a rich family. But their relationship is tested when Uma's brother Rajesh decides to intervene and break their bond. They elope and escape to Chennai and get married. Their family arrive there to separate the couple on the pretext of accepting them. Uma's parents drag her to them and Rajesh successfully gets in Ravi arrested under the false case of kidnapping Uma. Looking at the events, Uma's grandfather commits suicide in despair. Uma escapes from her home to save Ravi. The cop who is initially tortures Ravi later has a change of heart and helps the lovers. Rajesh arrives there to bring his sister. Uma files a false case against her brother for behaving inappropriately with her. Uma later admits that she did this to teach her brother a lesson for separating her from her husband. Pair gets united.

== Cast ==
- Ramesh Aravind as Ravi
- Sarathkumar as Rajesh
- Sudha Rani as Uma
- Goundamani as Ravi's friend's uncle
- V. K. Ramasamy as Uma's grandfather
- Sathyapriya as Uma's mother
- Major Sundarrajan as the Judge
- Charle as Ravi's friend
- Kitty as Uma's uncle
- K. K. Soundar as Ravi's uncle
- C. R. Saraswathi as Uma's lawyer
- Rajan P. Dev as the Inspector
- Prabhu Deva as a dancer

== Production ==
Vasanthakala Paravai is the directorial debut of Pavithran, and the first Tamil film produced by K. T. Kunjumon.

== Soundtrack ==
The music was composed by Deva, and the lyrics were written by Vaali.

Song	Singers
"Ennai Ketta"	Gangai Amaran
"Inni Thati"	S. P. Balasubrahmanyam, K. S. Chithra
"Sembaruthi Sembaruthi"	S. P. Balasubrahmanyam, S. Janaki
"Pon Vanil"	K. J. Yesudas
"Pothi Vacha"	Mano, K. S. Chithra
"Thai Masi"	S. P. Balasubrahmanyam, S. Janaki

== Release and reception ==
Vasanthakala Paravai was released on 19 September 1991. Sundarji of Kalki called it an ordinary love story, but appreciated some of the dialogues. Deva won the Cinema Express Award for Best Music Director.
