= Surieyan =

1992 film by Pavithran

- Theatrical release poster
- Directed by: Pavithran
- Written by: Pavithran
- Produced by: K. T. Kunjumon
- Starring: R. Sarathkumar; Roja; Babu Antony
- Cinematography: Ashok Kumar
- Edited by: B. Lenin; V. T. Vijayan
- Music by: Deva
- Production company: A. R. S. Film International
- Release date: 14 August 1992
- Country: India
- Language: Tamil

Surieyan (/suːrɪjən/ transl. Sun) (Note: Also the title character.) is a 1992 Indian Tamil-language action film written and directed by Pavithran, and produced by K. T. Kunjumon. The film, starring R. Sarathkumar, Roja and Babu Antony, revolves around an IPS officer who is forced to flee after being framed for shooting a minister. How he will prove his innocence forms the rest of the story.

Surieyan was released on 14 August 1992. The film became the first major success for Sarathkumar as a hero. It won three Cinema Express Awards, and was a trendsetter for further action films in the Tamil film industry itself.

== Plot ==
One day, a lady called Chettiyar Amma finds a man shivering due to intense cold weather in a truck which arrives in Top Slip, Pollachi. She immediately rescues him and treats him like her own son. The man, who prefers not to speak much, is called as Mottai by the people over there as a reference to him being bald. He gets employed as a driver to Usha, the only arrogant daughter of a rich landlord Koopu Konar. One day, Mottai, while replacing a tyre for Usha's car, lets something slip from his pocket, Upon retrieving the card, Usha is shocked to learn of Mottai's identity as Suriyan, an IPS officer serving in the Special Security Force, who is on the run after murdering the Union Home Minister. When she threatens to expose him, Suriyan rvelas that had he not killed the Home Minister, the nation would have lost the Prime Minister. Suriyan then reveals his back story.

During an international summit in Bangalore, the Union Home Minister urges Suriyan to devise a strategy to assassinate the Prime Minister of India promising him a few thousands of dollars in return. Suriyan gets furious and kills the home minister for which he is wanted by the police. Suriyan escapes from them and hides in Top Slip as he previously overheard home minister's conversation to his henchman Micky. Suriyan hides his identity and keeps monitoring the forest to trace the activities of Micky, so that he can prove his innocence.

Usha falls in love seeing Suriyan's dedication to nation. She elopes from her house and marries Suriyan contrary to her father's wishes. Meanwhile, Suriyan finds some suspicious activities in the forest and keeps track of them to gather evidence. Finally he finds out that Micky is under the protection of Koopu Konar and Micky plans to assassinate Prime Minister during his visit to Pollachi. Police trace the whereabouts of Suriyan and arrest him. Micky and Koopu Konar plan to kill Suriyan, so that they are saved. Koopu Konar secretly plants a bomb while visiting Surieyan in prison, but unfortunately, Koopu Konar himself gets killed in the attack. Suriyan escapes from prison and finds out Micky and kills him. In the end, the Prime Minister visits Surieyan and thanks him for his dedication.

== Cast ==
- R. Sarathkumar as Surieyan IPS / Mottai
- Babu Antony as Micky (Voice dubbed by J. Livingston)
- Roja as Usha (Voice dubbed by Durga Sundarrajan)
- Goundamani as Panikutti Ramasamy
- Manorama as Chettiyar Amma
- Omakuchi Narasimhan
- Rajan P. Dev as Koopu Konar
- Kitty as CBI officer
- Raju Sundaram in a special appearance
- Prabhu Deva (special appearance in the song "Lalakku Dol Dappi Ma")
- Pasi Narayanan as Ottavai Narayana
- A. Venkatesh as phone booth employee
- Viji (special appearance in the song "Lalakku Dol Dappi Ma")

== Production ==
After the success of Vasanthakala Paravai (1991), K. T. Kunjumon again collaborated with cast member Sarathkumar and director Pavithran for a new project titled Surieyan. During the scene where the title character shaves his hair, Sarathkumar himself did so because the producers were unable to hire a barber. The film was shot at different locations including Top Slip and places in Rajasthan. S. Shankar and A. Venkatesh worked as associate directors.

== Soundtrack ==
The soundtrack was composed by Deva, and the lyrics for the songs were written by Vaali. The song "Pathinettu Vayadhu" is based on "Kanda Shasti Kavasam", a Hindu devotional song. The song "Laalaku Dole" belongs to the dappankuthu genre, and follows a 6/8 time signature. For the Telugu-dubbed version Mande Suryudu, the lyrics were written by Rajasri.

Tamil
No.	Title	Singer(s)	Length
1.	"Laalaku Dole"	Deva, Mano, S. Janaki
2.	"Kottungadi Kummi"	S. Janaki, S. P. Balasubrahmanyam
3.	"Pathinettu Vayadhu"	S. Janaki, S. P. Balasubrahmanyam
4.	"Mannathi Mannargal"	S. P. Balasubrahmanyam
5.	"Thoongu Moonchi"	S. Janaki, S. P. Balasubrahmanyam

Telugu
No.	Title	Singer(s)	Length
1.	"Eay Oye Ayi Jummalaka"	S. P. Balasubrahmanyam, K. S. Chithra	4:20
2.	"Piliche Vayasu Palike Sogasu"	S. P. Balasubrahmanyam, K. S. Chithra	5:16
3.	"Choodu Choodu Oorantha"	S. P. Balasubrahmanyam, K. S. Chithra	5:11
4.	"Maataina Botaina Okatele Needi"	S. P. Balasubrahmanyam	5:02
5.	"Mugdaraali Navve"	S. P. Balasubrahmanyam, K. S. Chithra	4:53
Total length:			24:44

== Release and reception ==
Surieyan was released on 14 August 1992. On the same day, Ayyappa Prasad The Indian Express wrote "[Surieyan] is a racy entertainer that keeps the viewers attention engaged till the end". On 22 August, K. Vijiyan of New Straits Times praised the director, saying he "succeeds in keeping the viewers in suspense" but criticised the stunt sequences for being unconvincing. C. R. K. of Kalki praised the acting, comedy and cinematography. At the 13th Cinema Express Awards, Goundamani won the Award for Best Comedian, M. Sundaram won for Best Dance Master, and Sarathkumar received an "extraordinary Special Award" for acting in the film.

== Legacy ==
The film was a major breakthrough for Sarathkumar who previously played mainly negative roles, and its success made him a much sought-after lead actor. It also helped popularise Top Slip as a tourist attraction. The comedy track performed by Goundamani became popular, as did his dialogue "Arasiyalla Ithellam Satharanampa" (transl. This is all routine in politics).
