= Oyilattam (film) =

- Poster
- Directed by: R. Sundarrajan
- Written by: R. Sundarrajan
- Produced by: J. V. Rukmangandan
- Starring: C. Ranganathan; Charmila
- Cinematography: Rajarajan
- Edited by: Srinivas Krishna
- Music by: Deva
- Production company: Leo International
- Release date: 2 October 1991
- Country: India
- Language: Tamil

Oyilattam (/oʊ.ilɑːttəm/ transl. Dance of grace) is a 1991 Indian Tamil-language dance film written and directed by R. Sundarrajan. The film stars C. Ranganathan and Charmila, both in their debut as lead actors. It was released on 2 October 1991.

== Cast ==
- C. Ranganathan as Chinnasamy
- Charmila as Hamsaveni
- Radha Ravi
- Senthil
- Anu Mohan
- Kumarimuthu
- Chinnakannu
- Bhavani
- K. K. Soundar
- Pasi Narayanan
- A. K. Senthil
- R. Sundarrajan as Aarumuga Udayar (uncredited)

== Production ==
C. Ranganathan who went on to direct films like Coimbatore Mappillai (1996) and Tata Birla (1996) made his acting debut as lead actor with this film. Charmila, a former child actress, made her debut in a leading role with this film.

== Soundtrack ==
The music was composed by Deva, with lyrics by Kalidasan.

Track listing
No.	Title	Singer(s)	Length
1.	"Theppakulathukulla"	S. Janaki
2.	"Adhu Maathram"	Malaysia Vasudevan
3.	"Aathoram"	Sunandha
4.	"Vandhanam Vandhanam"	Malaysia Vasudevan
5.	"Thazhuvi Thazhuvi"	S. P. Balasubrahmanyam, S.Janaki
6.	"Paada Vantha"	S. P. Balasubrahmanyam
7.	"Oru Penna Nenacha"	Malaysia Vasudevan, Minmini

== Reception ==
C. R. K. of Kalki wrote Oyilattam is no different from other village centric films with typical elements but the rustic smell with the forest of nature is a bit too strong while praising the acting of Sundarrajan but felt after the arrival of Radha Ravi, the story changes direction and goes nowhere and concluded saying even if the rhythm escapes, Oyilattam is modestly beautiful.
