= Shrungara Kavya =

1993 film by S. Mahendar

- Title card
- Directed by: S. Mahendar
- Written by: S. Mahendar
- Produced by: M Govindraj; M Udayakumar Babu
- Starring: Raghuveer; Sindhu
- Cinematography: Suresh Kalyani
- Edited by: Shyam Yadav
- Music by: Hamsalekha
- Production company: Hemanjali Productions
- Release date: 1 March 1993
- Country: India
- Language: Kannada

Shrungara Kavya is a 1993 Indian Kannada-language romance drama film directed by S. Mahendar and starring Raghuveer and Sindhu. The film was a box office success.

== Cast ==
- Raghuveer as Shrungar
- Sindhu as Kavya
- Ashok Rao
- Shobaraj
- Tennis Krishna

== Production ==
After the success of Chaitrada Premanjali (1992), S. Narayan was to write the film's dialogues. However, he left the film and made Anuragada Alegalu (1993) based on Raghuveer's script.

== Soundtrack ==
The music was composed and written by Hamsalekha.

Track listing
No.	Title	Singer(s)	Length
1.	"Kannada Gangeyali"	S. P. Balasubrahmanyam, K. S. Chithra	4:59
2.	"O Meghave Meghave"	S. P. Balasubrahmanyam, K. S. Chithra	4:52
3.	"Shrungara Kaavya"	L.N Shastry	4:15
4.	"Ambara Chumbitha"	S. P. Balasubrahmanyam, K. S. Chithra	4:57
5.	"Jeevanavellavu Naa Haduve"	S. P. Balasubrahmanyam	4:48
6.	"Yaaru Nodaru Yaaru Kelaru"	S. P. Balasubrahmanyam, Latha Hamsalekha	4:59
Total length:			28:50

== Release ==
When this film was ready for release, many distributors wanted to buy the film. However, Raghuveer who had faced insults earlier during the release of Chaitrada Premanjali (1992) refused to sell the rights to people who had rejected him. After the success of this film, Raghuveer and Sindhu starred together in Thungabhadra (1995) and Naviloora Naidile (1995) and got married in 1995.
