= Paattali Magan =

- Title card
- Directed by: Senthilnathan
- Written by: Kovai Mani; Nanjai Thangam
- Produced by: Kovai Mani
- Starring: Arjun; Sindhu; M. N. Nambiar
- Cinematography: Kesavan
- Edited by: Satti Babu
- Music by: Sangeetha Rajan
- Production company: Anbu Lakshmi Films
- Release date: 16 February 1990
- Running time: 113 minutes
- Country: India
- Language: Tamil

Paattali Magan (transl. The proletariat's son) is a 1990 Indian Tamil language drama film directed by Senthilnathan and produced by Kovai Mani. The film stars Arjun, Sindhu and M. N. Nambiar. It was released on 16 February 1990.

== Cast ==
- Arjun as Gopi
- Sindhu
- M. N. Nambiar
- Sathyapriya
- Goundamani
- Senthil
- Kumarimuthu
- Kamala Kamesh
- Vijaychandrika
- Sribala
- K. K. Soundar
- K. Kannan
- Omakuchi Narasimhan
- Usilai Mani
- Kanal Kannan as Henchman (special appearance)

== Soundtrack ==
The soundtrack was composed by Sangeetha Rajan.

Track listing
No.	Title	Lyrics	Singer(s)	Length
1.	"Thoppukkulle Kuruvi"	Kovai Mani	K. J. Yesudas, K. S. Chithra	4:34
2.	"Naattamai Ponnu"	Kovai Mani	S. P. Balasubrahmanyam, K. S. Chithra	4:17
3.	"Pattali Magan"	Vaali	S. P. Balasubrahmanyam	4:19
4.	"Poothiruchu"	Vairamuthu	K. J. Yesudas, Sujatha	6:15
5.	"Themmangu Paduthu"	Sembaiya	S. P. Balasubrahmanyam, K. S. Chithra	5:02
6.	"Selathu Rottu Mele"	Sembaiya	S. P. Balasubrahmanyam	5:00
