= J. K. Rithesh =

Indian actor (1973–2019)

J. K. Ritheesh
- Born: Mugavai Kumar; 5 March 1973; Kandy, Sri Lanka
- Died: 13 April 2019 (aged 46); Ramanathapuram, India
- Occupations: Actor, Producer, Entrepreneur
- Years active: 2007 - 2019
- Spouse: Jotheeswari (m. 2007)
- Children: 2 sons and a daughter
- Parents: Thiru.Kuzhandaivelu (father); Thirumathi.Jayalakshmi (mother)

J. K. Rithesh (5 March 1973 – 13 April 2019) was an Indian actor and politician. He was a Dravida Munnetra Kazhagam (DMK) Member of Parliament (MP) in the 15th Lok Sabha from Ramanathpuram constituency. In the Indian general elections of 2009, Rithesh received 294,945 votes to defeat his closest rival, Satiyamoorthy of All India Anna Dravida Munnetra Kazhagam (AIADMK) party by a margin of 69,215 votes. On 10 April 2014, he joined the AIADMK as a primary member. He died on 13 April 2019, due to heart attack.

== Early life and education ==
Rithesh was born in Kandy, Sri Lanka in 1973 before migrating to Rameswaram in 1976, where he was brought up. His father was employed in the agricultural sector and his mother is a housewife. Rithesh has two elder sisters, Shanthi and Mani. Rithesh married Jotheeswari in 2007 and has a son, Arik Roshan (born 2008). He completed Diploma in Civil Engineering at Mohamed Sathak Polytechnic College Kilakarai, Ramanathapuram district.

== Career ==
His first film was Kaanal Neer, directed by Chinni Jayanth. Rithesh had helped produce the project but the film failed to become a success at the box-office. His second film, Nayagan took an average opening at the box-office.

After the moderate performance of Nayagan, the actor announced several projects and started work on films including Thillu Mullu alongside another debutant Siddique, a film with Chinni Jayanth, Deivamagan and his home production, Thalapathy. As of 2019, none of these projects have been completed. He made his acting comeback with a negative role in LKG.

He was arrested in November 2011 in a land grabbing case. He was booked in charges of cheating a US citizen of Indian origin for promising him buying a land.

== Death ==
Rithesh died on 13 April 2019, due to a heart attack at Ramanathapuram at the age of 46.

== Filmography ==
Year	Film	Role	Notes	Ref
2007	Kaanal Neer	Rajavel		
2008	Nayagan	Guru		
2010	Pen Singam	Advocate		
2019	LKG	Ramraj Pandian		
