= Vilakku Vacha Nerathula =

- விளக்கு வச்ச நேரத்துலே
- Genre: Soap opera
- Written by: K. Bhagyaraj
- Screenplay by: K. Bhagyaraj
- Directed by: C. Ranganathan
- Creative director: Subhaa Venkat
- Starring: Sujitha; Sanjeev; Anuradha Krishnamoorthy; Kaushik; Delhi Kumar
- Theme music composer: Deva (Title Song); Kiran (Background Score)
- Opening theme: "Vilakku Vacha Nerathula" (Vocals); S. P. Balasubrahmanyam; Anuradha Sriram; Vairamuthu (Lyrics)
- Original language: Tamil
- No. of episodes: 578

Production
- Camera setup: Multi-camera
- Running time: approx. 20-22 minutes per episode
- Production company: Ever Smile

Original release
- Network: Kalaignar TV
- Release: 18 January 2009 – 10 October 2012

Vilakku Vacha Nerathula (Tamil: விளக்கு வச்ச நேரத்துலே) is an Indian Tamil-language soap opera that aired on Kalaignar TV. The show premiered on 18 January 2009. It aired Monday through Friday at 8:00PM IST. The show starring by Sujitha, Sanjeev, Anuradha Krishnamoorthy, Kaushik and Delhi Kumar.

The show Written and Screenplay by K. Bhagyaraj, Directed by C. Ranganathan and Production by Ever Smile. The show last aired on 10 October 2012 and ended with 287 episodes.

== Plot ==
An educated girl named Pavithra lives in a village where her father runs a finance company. Pavithra's mother wants her married to her brother's son. Due to some misunderstanding the families are not in terms with each other. So Pavithra's family decided to avoid this and began to look for another proposal for her. Pavithra's mother visits an astrologer for advice. In the meanwhile Pratap, a NRI from Singapore meets Pavithra at a bus stop and falls in love with her. Before leaving to Singapore he asks his friend to gather information about Pavithra. Mentally challenged Chelladurai, a landlord in Pavithra's village along with his mother. Chelladurai mother believes that marriage will solve his problems. On seeing Pavithra's horoscope the astrologer tells her mother about some problem. After hearing this Pavithra's mother hides what the astrologer told her. The story unfolds from here.

== Cast ==
=== Main cast ===
- Sujitha as Pavithira
- Sanjeev as Prathap
- Kaushik as Chelladurai and Johnny (dual role)

=== Additional cast ===
- Anuradha Krishnamoorthy
- Delhi Kumar
- Sivan Srinivasan
- Kalaranjani
- Koushik
- Dev Anand
- Baboos
- Kaveri
- Theni Rajesh
- Sundari
- Sruthi
- Sathya
- Banumathi

== Airing history ==
The show started airing on Kalaignar TV on 18 January 2010. It aired on Monday to Friday 8:00PM. Later its timing changed to Monday to Friday at 9:30PM.

== International broadcast ==
- (India) It aired in the Indian state of Andhra Pradesh on RVS TV Dubbed in Telugu language.
- (India) In Indian Tamil Channel on Mega TV
