= Kaanal Neer =

- Title card
- Directed by: Chinni Jayanth
- Written by: Chinni Jayanth; Ravikiran
- Starring: J. K. Rithesh; Chinni Jayanth; Manisha Chatterjee
- Cinematography: R. Sunderrajan; R. Chandrasekhar
- Music by: Suresh-Bobby
- Production company: Ashtalakshmi Creators
- Release date: 12 April 2007
- Country: India
- Language: Tamil

Kaanal Neer (transl. Mirage) is a 2007 Indian Tamil-language drama film written and directed by Chinni Jayanth. The film stars J. K. Rithesh, Chinni Jayanth and Manisha Chatterjee. It was released on 12 April 2007.

== Cast ==
- J. K. Rithesh as Rajavel
- Chinni Jayanth as Pari
- Manisha Chatterjee as Lakshmi
- Sarjit as Shakthi
- Ambuli as Durai Singam
- Alex
- Sathyapriya
- Devan
- Ponnambalam
- Scissor Manohar
- Suja in an item number

== Soundtrack ==
Soundtrack was composed by Suresh-Bobby.

Track listing
No.	Title	Singer(s)	Length
1.	"Kaanal Neere"	Karthik
2.	"Aararo"	K. S. Chithra
3.	"Chella Chella"	Tippu, Saindhavi, Vijay Yesudas
4.	"Enakena Pirantha"	Vijay Yesudas, Saindhavi
5.	"Poonthottam"	Tippu

== Reception ==
A critic from Chennai Online wrote, "it's not a hyped film or one that boasts of big names, but it has its light moments, and it's a much better crafted film than the director's earlier effort, Unakkaga Mattum (2000)". A reviewer from IndiaReel noted, "trying to present a serious movie on friendship, Chinni and new face Ritheesh have succeeded in giving a hip-roaring comedy film and tested the patience of audience in each and every scene". Lajjavathi of Kalki wrote that while films like Mozhi are taking Tamil cinema to the next level, Kaanal Neer has not recovered since the time of landlords and added that Chinni Jayanth as director did not score as much as actor, called the background score grating, cinematography was okay and screenplay as dull and concluded saying Chinni should come out with a better script next time. SRA of The Hindu wrote, "The screenplay in the second half slightly sags while the dialogue by Ravikiran is crisp", criticising the background score by Suresh-Bobby and praising the cinematography by Chandrasekhar.
