= Charmila =

Indian actress (born 1974)

Charmila Manoharan
- Born: 2 October 1974 (age 51); Chennai, Tamil Nadu, India
- Education: Ethiraj College for Women, Chennai
- Occupation: Actress
- Years active: 1991 – present
- Spouses: Kishor Satya (m. 1996; div. 1999); Rajesh (m. 2006; div. 2014)
- Children: 1
- Parents: Manoharan; Haise

Charmila (born 2 October 1974) is an Indian actress who predominantly works in Malayalam cinema. Apart from movies in Malayalam, she acted in Tamil, Telugu and Kannada movies. She completed almost 38 films in the Malayalam film industry.

== Early life ==
Charmila was born to veterinary doctor Manoharan, who was also working in S.B.I., and Haise, a homemaker, in a Tamil Catholic family in Chennai. She studied in Holy Angels Convent and Ethiraj College for Women. She has a younger sister Angelina.

== Personal life ==
She married Kishor Satya in 1996 and was later divorced in 1999.

Later, she married Rajesh in 2006, an engineer working in Nokia and got divorced in 2014. The couple have one son.

In 2024, She accused Malayalam film director Hariharan and M. P. Mohanan of sexually harassing her.

== Film career ==
Charmila made her debut on the silver screen with Oyilattam and went on to act in a couple of movies including Kizhakke Varum Pattu. She was recommended in Tamil movies by veteran actor S.S.Rajendran. She made her debut in the Malayalam film Dhanam, directed by Sibi Malayil.

She hosted a show Jillunu Oru Sandhippu on Vijay TV, and participated in Jodi Number One on the same channel.

== Partial filmography ==
Year	Title	Role	Language	Notes
1979	Nallathoru Kudumbam	Ramu	Tamil	Child artist
1991	Oyilattam	Hamsaveni	Tamil	
1991	Thaiyalkaran	Lakshmi	Tamil	
1991	Dhanam	Thankam	Malayalam	
1991	Uncle Bun	Rosie	Malayalam	
1991	Pranadaata	Jyothi	Telugu	
1991	Prema Khaidi	Sarala	Telugu	
1991	Keli	Sridevi	Malayalam	
1992	Priyapetta Kukku	Sandhya	Malayalam	
1992	Harihara Puthiran		Tamil	
1992	Teja		Telugu	
1993	Kizhakke Varum Paattu	Kanmani	Tamil	
1993	Periyamma	Leela	Tamil	
1993	Paadhukaappu	Latha	Tamil	
1993	Asadhyuraalu	Leela	Telugu	
1993	Kabooliwala	Laila	Malayalam	
1994	Kambolam	Pavizham	Malayalam	
1994	Kadal	Safia	Malayalam	
1994	Rajadhani	Parvathi	Malayalam	
1995	Thirumanassu	Chempakam	Malayalam	
1995	Special Squad	Sherly	Malayalam	
1995	Peter Scott	Nisha	Malayalam	
1995	Kalamasseriyil Kalyanayogam	Aswathi Nair	Malayalam	
1995	Arabia	Sindoori	Malayalam	
1995	Rajakeeyam	Gayathri	Malayalam	
1995	Killikurushiyile Kudumba Mela	Asha	Malayalam	
1996	Musthaffaa	Lalitha	Tamil	
1997	Gajaraja Manthram	Vineetha	Malayalam	
1997	Adivaram	Salomi	Malayalam	
1997	Manikya Koodaram	Geethu	Malayalam	
1997	Arjunan Pillayum Anchu Makkalum	Jayasree	Malayalam	
1998	Kulirkaattu		Malayalam	
2001	Thenthulli		Malayalam	
2001	Kathakan		Malayalam	
2002	Jagathy Jagadeesh in Town	Geetha	Malayalam	
2002	Kakki Nakshatram	Celina	Malayalam	
2002	Nirappakittu	Liza	Malayalam	
2002	Asurayugam		Malayalam	
2002	Madhuram	Madhurima	Malayalam	
2002	Sundaripravu	Annie	Malayalam	
2004	Swarna Medal	Reena	Malayalam	
2005	Nombaram	Meenakshi	Malayalam	
2006	Madana	Vaishnavi	Kannada	
2007	Manase Mounama	Kavitha	Tamil	As Sanya
2009	Unnai Kann Theduthe	Geetha	Tamil	
2010	Vilai	Shanmugavel's wife	Tamil	
2010	Yathumaagi		Tamil	
2010	Kotti		Tamil	
2010	Puzhal	Rita's mother	Tamil	
2010	Chandulli Cheluve		Kannada	
2011	Mahaan Kanakku		Tamil	
2012	Oru Mazhai Naangu Saaral		Tamil	
2012	Adhikaram 92	Actress	Tamil	
2012	Naan	Karthik's mother	Tamil	
2013	Ivan Veramathiri	Malini's mother	Tamil	
2013	Kanavu Kadhalan	Sandhya's akka	Tamil	
2014	Vikramadithyan	Vikraman's mother	Malayalam	
2014	Vilasam	Shanthi	Tamil	
2014	Unamai	Hero's mother	Tamil	
2014	Vaazhum Dheivam	Manimekhalai	Tamil	
2015	Nanbargal Narpani Mandram	Sathya's mother	Tamil	
2015	MGR Sivaji Rajini Kamal	Ayana's relative	Tamil	
2016	Nermugam	Saranya	Tamil	
2016	Pudhusa Naan Poranthen	Kiran's mother	Tamil	
2018	Nalinakanthi	Sharmila	Tamil	
2018	Genius	Priscilla's mother	Tamil	
2019	Red Signal	Mayoori	Malayalam	
2019	Priyapettavar	Sumithra	Malayalam	
2019	Oru Patham Classile Pranayam	Lekshmi	Malayalam	
2019	Oru Mass Katha Veendum	Shyama	Malayalam	
2020	Cochin Shadhi at Chennai 03	Lakshmi	Malayalam	
2020	Kanni Raasi	Lekshmi	Tamil	
2022	Grandma	Nikki's grandma	Tamil	
2022	Made in Trivandrum		Malayalam	
2023	Ali Akbar	Jumana	Malayalam	
2023	Mathangi		Malayalam	
2023	Miss Maagie		Tamil	
2024	RK Vellimegham		Malayalam	

== TV shows ==
- Red Carpet
- Mun Jenmam
- JB Junction
- Comedy Festival
- Comedy Super Nite
- My Favourites
- Star Kitchen
- Innalathe Tharam
- Celebrity Kitchen
- Rani Maharani
- Manam Thirumbuthe
- Onnum Onnum Moonu
- ACV - Showcase
- Entertainment News
- Icebreak with Veena
- Comedy Stars
- Asianet News
- Badayi Bunglavu
- Editor's Hour
- Nishkalangathayude Charmila
- Open Talk
- Star Chat
- Jillunu Oru Sandhippu
- Jodi Number One

== Television serials ==
Year	Title	Role	Channel	Language	Notes
	Unarvugal	Seetha	Varnam TV	Tamil	
1996	Judgement		Varnam TV	Tamil	
2016	Mangalyapattu	Menaka	Mazhavil Manorama	Malayalam	left the serial for unknown reasons
2019	Queen	Shakthi Sheshadri's grandmother	MX Player	Tamil	TV Webseries
	Queen 2			Tamil	Webseries

== Albums ==
- Fathima Beevi – Malayalam
- Uyir Naal Vare – Malayalam

== Advertisements ==
- A J Jewellery – Malayalam
