= Namrata Sundaresan =

Indian cheesemaker

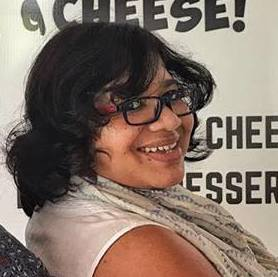
- Occupations: cook and entrepreneur
- Known for: winning the Nari Shakti Puraskar

Namrata Sundaresan is an Indian social entrepreneur, chef and cheesemaker. She won the 2017 Nari Shakti Puraskar with Anuradha Krishnamoorthy.

== Career ==
Namrata Sundaresan was born an Odia and moved to Chennai in Tamil Nadu after getting married. She built her career through founding an international consulting agency. Sundaresan learnt how to make cheese in Coonoor and then discussed with her friend Anuradha Krishnamoorthy becoming cheesemakers and employing disabled women. They set up the artisanal cheese producers Käse and their social entrepreneurship led to winning the Nari Shakti Puraskar for 2017. The awards were made to on International Women's Day in 2018 on behalf of the Ministry of Women and Child Development by the President of India. The award is the highest award for women in India.

Sundaresan is a self-taught chef. She began cooking Peruvian food in 2017 for a supper club organised by Arundhati Balachandran and Suneethi Raj of LocalXO. She visited the Gourmet Bazaar in Coimbatore with her cheeses in 2019. By 2020, she had cooked 25 dinners and the group planned a new series with Sundaresan making dishes from her favourite cookbooks.
