= Sahila Chaddha =

Indian film actress

Sahila Chadha
- Born: India
- Occupation: Actress
- Years active: 1985–2014
- Notable work: Bol Radha Bol; Shatranj; Hum Aapke Hain Koun..!
- Spouse: Nimai Bali
- Children: 1

Sahila Chadha (Chaddha is an alternative spelling for the surname Chadha) is an Indian former actress and beauty pageant titleholder.

== Personal life ==
Sahila is married to actor Nimai Bali, with whom she has a daughter.

== Career ==
Sahila was crowned Miss India and won 25 contests before becoming a Miss India. She played the character of Rita in the film Hum Aapke Hain Koun and has featured alongside many superstars, including Shahrukh Khan, Salman Khan, Govinda, and Sanjay Dutt.

== Filmography ==
Year	Film	Role	Language
1985	I Love You		Hindi
1986	Nasamajh		Hindi
1986	Africadalli Sheela	Sheela	Kannada
1987	Kizhakku Africavil Sheela	Sheela	Tamil
1987	Sheela	Sheela	Hindi
1987	Dagabaaz Balma	Chanda	Bhojpuri
1988	Veerana	Sahila	Hindi
1989	Nache Nagin Gali Gali	Roop	Hindi
1989	Sau Saal Baad		Hindi
1989	Ajnabi Saaya		Hindi
1989	Beauty Queen		Hindi
1989	Jawani Ke Gunah		Hindi
1989	Ab Meri Baari		Hindi
1990	Sailaab	Monty's Wife	Hindi
1990	Pyasi Nigahen	Disco Dancer Sonu	Hindi
1990	Karishma Kismat Ka		Hindi
1990	Jaan Lada Denge		Hindi
1990	Awaragardi		Hindi
1991	Bhabhi	Sonia	Hindi
1991	Dharam Sankat	Son Kanwar (Sona Daaku)	Hindi
1991	Aaj Ka Samson	Juliet	Hindi
1991	Khooni Raat		Hindi
1992	Maa	Mona	Hindi
1992	Daulat Ki Jung	Special appearance in the song "Hai Daiya Jhumke"	Hindi
1992	Bol Radha Bol	Special appearance in the song "Deewana Dil Beqarar Tha"	Hindi
1993	Game	Special appearance in the song "Macho Man"	Hindi
1993	Kayda Kanoon	Special appearance in the song "Tadpane Do Tadpane Do"	Hindi
1993	Shatranj	Supporting role, Kader Khan's love interest	Hindi
1994	Chaand Ka Tudka	Special appearance in the song "Aaja Deewane"	Hindi
1994	Hum Aapke Hain Koun..!	Rita	Hindi
1994	Ganga Aur Ranga	Gangaa	Hindi
1995	Ab Insaf Hoga	Sabina B. Khan	Hindi
1996	Namak	Asha K. Sharma	Hindi
1997	Lakha		Hindi
1998	Tirchhi Topiwale		Hindi
1998	Aunty No. 1		Hindi
2001	Badla Aurat Ka		Hindi
2001	One 2 Ka 4	Bipasha	Hindi
2004	Ganga Ke Paar Saiyan Hamar		Bhojpuri
2006	Jai Santoshi Maa	Bhabhi	Hindi
2008	Tulsi		Hindi
