= Mugila Chumbana =

Indian romantic drama film

- Theatrical release poster
- Directed by: B Shankar
- Story by: Raghuveer
- Produced by: Raghuveer
- Starring: Raghuveer; Shravanthi; Shakuntala
- Cinematography: P K H Das
- Music by: Vijayanand
- Production company: Manjunath Creations
- Release date: 20 December 2013
- Country: India
- Language: Kannada

Mugila Chumbana (transl. Kiss of clouds) is a 2013 Indian Kannada-language romantic drama film directed by B Shankar. The film was also produced and co-written by Raghuveer, who also stars in the film alongside Shravanthi and Shakuntala.

== Plot ==
Harish, who returned from America after pursuing his MBA, manages his father's garment factory. He falls in love with Sowmya after chancing upon her photograph only to realise that she had died. Sangeetha, who has to deal with familial pressure to get married, falls in one-sided love with Harish after he helps her out. Although Harish rejects Sangeetha's love initially, he eventually accepts her love.

== Cast ==
- Raghuveer as Harish
- Shravanthi as Sangeetha
- Shakuntala
- Srilalitha
- Rajanand
- Ashok Rao
- Shivaram

== Soundtrack ==
Mugila Chumbana

Soundtrack album by Vijayanand
- Released: 2013
- Recorded: late 1980s–mid 1990s
- Genre: Feature film soundtrack
- Language: Kannada
- Label: Lahari Music
- Producer: Vijay Anand

Vijayanand chronology
Uttara Dhruvadin Dakshina Dhruvaku (2000)	Mugila Chumbana (2013)

The music was composed by Vijayanand.

Track listing
No.	Title	Lyrics	Singer(s)	Length
1.	"Chinni Chintamani"	S. Narayan	Rajesh Krishnan, Manjula Gururaj	4:30
2.	"Belake Hombelake"	S. Narayan	Rajesh Krishnan	4:53
3.	"Premaraga Thapidaaga"	R. N. Jayagopal	Rajesh Krishnan, Soumya	5:21
4.	"Sangeetha I Love You"	S. Narayan	Rajesh Krishnan, Soumya	4:43
5.	"Yaare Nee Muddu Mogadavale"	S. Narayan	Rajesh Krishnan, Soumya	4:59
6.	"Prema Pallaki"	R. N. Jayagopal	Rajesh Krishnan, Manjula Gururaj	5:08
Total length:				29:34

== Release and reception ==
The film was released after much delay to negative reviews and was a box office failure. The direction, story, and cinematography were criticised while the music was called the film's saving grace. This was Raghuveer's last film before his untimely death.

A critic from Deccan Herald wrote that "Mugila Chumbana remains as elusive as the first kiss between the rains and a parched earth during droughty summers". A critic from The Times of India wrote that "Except for music by Vijayanand, there is nothing positive in the movie. But unnecessary song sequences placed at wrong times not only irritates you, but also disrupts the flow of the story".
