= Nayagan (2008 film) =

- Title card
- Directed by: Saravana Sakthi
- Written by: Vijaykumar Reddy
- Starring: J. K. Rithesh; Ramana; Sangeetha; Keerthi Chawla; Anita Hassanandani; Anandaraj
- Cinematography: Abu Shaah
- Edited by: M. Sankar
- Music by: Mariya Manohar
- Production company: Shakya Celluloid
- Release date: 22 August 2008
- Country: India
- Language: Tamil
- Budget: ₹8 crore

Nayagan (transl. Hero) is a 2008 Indian Tamil language action film directed by Saravana Sakthi, produced by Chakya Celluloid, and written by Vijaykumar Reddy.

The film stars J. K. Rithesh, Ramana, Sangeetha, Keerthi Chawla, Anita Hassanandani, and Anandaraj. It features guest appearances in item numbers by Anita Hassanandani and Rachana Maurya. The music was composed by Mariya Manohar.

The film released on 22 August 2008, was a direct remake of the Tamil film Vegam (2007) which itself was an uncredited remake of the 2004 American film Cellular. Nayagan was not a success, but Rithesh gained significant attention due to the film's extensive marketing. The film was released in Telugu as Ankusam.

== Plot ==
Dr. Sandhya Viswanath is kidnapped from her home by a gang and taken to another location, where she is questioned about her husband's whereabouts. Though the phone in her room is smashed by the gang's leader, she manages to put together enough broken pieces to make random calls. One of her calls reaches Sakthi, who has his own set of problems since he is on the run after eloping with his uncle's daughter Divya. Initially reluctant, he agrees to help Sandhya and drops the phone off at a police station. The cop Guru talks to her but is distracted by another problem, and so Sandhya has to bank on Shakti again.

== Cast ==
- J. K. Rithesh as Guru
- Ramana as Sakthi
- Sangeetha as Dr. Sandhya Viswanath
- Keerthi Chawla as Divya
- Anita Hassanandani as Nila
- Rachana Maurya
- Anandaraj as Gang Leader (dual role)
- Radha Ravi
- Pandiarajan as Konjumani
- Sriman
- Vijay Babu
- Devipriya
- Santhana Bharathi
- Pandu
- Vaiyapuri
- Sabitha Anand
- Crane Manohar
- Scissor Manohar
- Muthukaalai

== Soundtrack ==
Music by Mariya Manohar.

- "Chee Chee Poda"
- "Irundhakka Allikodu"
- "Manimaniyaga"
- "Naan Vellakkara Baby"
- "Nila Nila Oodiva"
- "Oosai Uyiroosai"

== Reception ==
Pavithra Srinivasan of Rediff.com rated the film two out of five stars and wrote, "Eventually, it does fall into place -- and the various twists and turns Shakthi [Rithesh] goes through to get at the end are interesting". A critic from Sify wrote, "Nayagan, does not claim anything big. It is unpretentious and turns out to be a slick and racy cop story with all essential masala ingredients, to drive away your weekend blues". The film was also reviewed by Kalki.
