= Indina Ramayana =

- VCD cover
- Directed by: Rajachandra
- Written by: Chi. Udayashankar (dialogues)
- Screenplay by: Rajachandra
- Story by: Visu
- Produced by: Dwarakish
- Starring: Vishnuvardhan; Sridhar; Tulasi
- Cinematography: D. D. Prasad
- Edited by: Goutham Raju
- Music by: Vijay Anand
- Production company: Dwarakish Chithra
- Release date: 25 July 1984
- Running time: 113 minutes
- Country: India
- Language: Kannada

Indina Ramayana ( transl. Today's Ramayana) is a 1984 Indian Kannada-language film, directed by Rajachandra and produced by Dwarakish. The film stars Vishnuvardhan, Sridhar and Tulasi. It is a remake of the Tamil film Oorukku Upadesam, itself based on Visu's play Sirithu Konde Azhugirom (transl. We laugh as we cry). The film had a successful run of 25 weeks in Mysore.

== Cast ==
- Vishnuvardhan as Shankara
- Sridhar as Rama
- Tulasi in a dual role as Janaki and Madhavi
- Gayatri as Sudha (Guest Appearance)
- C. R. Simha as Vedhantha Krishnachari
- Leelavathi as Kausalya
- Sathish
- Dileep
- Devishree
- Baby Leela
- Alka
- Mazhar Khan
- Lohithaswa as Justice Janakiramaiah
- Rathnakar
- Tomato Somu
- Suryakumar
- B. V. Murthy
- Sundar Raj
- Hanumanthachar

== Soundtrack ==
The music was composed by Vijay Anand, with lyrics by Chi. Udayashankar. Anand, the composer of the original, was chosen for the remake after Dwarakish was impressed with his work in the original.

Song	Singers	Length
"Nalleya Savimathe"	S. P. Balasubrahmanyam, Vani Jairam	04:43
"Oorella Ninna Hinde"	S. P. Balasubrahmanyam	04:27
"Saniha Neeriralu"	Manjula	04:29
"Aase Hechchagide"	S. P. Balasubrahmanyam, Manjula	05:32
