= M. Thyagarajan =

Indian film director and screenwriter

- Died: December , 2021
- Occupations: Film director; screenwriter

M. Thyagarajan (died 2021) was an Indian film director and screenwriter who worked in Tamil films.

== Life ==
Thyagarajan was originally from Aruppukkottai. During his time at a film college, he was acquainted with future editor G. Jayachandran and cinematographer Siva. He made his directorial debut with Vetri Mel Vetri (1989), which did not achieve much success. He later directed AVM Productions' 150th film Maanagara Kaaval (1991), which became a major success. However, he did not get further directorial offers and suffered in poverty. In the mid-2000s, Thyagarajan was separated from his wife, who retained sole custody of their children, while he lived alone. He was found dead near AVM Studios in early December 2021.

== Filmography ==
Year	Film
1989	Vetri Mel Vetri
1991	Maanagara Kaaval
