= Sheela (1987 film) =

- Directed by: Deepak Balraj Vij
- Screenplay by: Anwar Khan
- Story by: Dwarakish
- Produced by: Dwarakish
- Starring: Nana Patekar; Sahila Chaddha
- Cinematography: R. Deviprasad
- Edited by: Gautham Raju
- Music by: Songs: Bappi Lahiri; Score: Vijay Anand
- Production company: Dwarakish Chitra
- Release date: 1987
- Country: India
- Language: Hindi

Sheela is a 1987 Indian Hindi-language fantasy adventure film directed by Deepak Balraj Vij and starring Nana Patekar and Sahila Chaddha in the titular role. The film is a remake of the 1986 Kannada film Africadalli Sheela, which itself is based on Sheena, Queen of the Jungle.

== Cast ==
- Kulbhushan Kharbanda
- Nana Patekar
- Ranjeeta as Sheela's mother
- Charan Raj
- Sahila Chaddha as Sheela
- Amrit Pal
- Anand Balraj
- Disco Shanti
- Sudhir
- Manik Irani
- Paintal
- Jack Gaud
- Vimal Chadda
- C. S. Dubey
- Thoogudeepa Srinivas
- Kanchana
- Prabha Mishra
- Baby Reena

== Soundtrack ==
All lyrics are written by Anjaan; all music is composed by Bappi Lahiri.

Track listing
No.	Title	Singer(s)	Length
1.	"Takta Muni Mana"	Bappi Lahiri, Nazia Hassan	6:03
2.	"Bahon Mein Narmi"	Bappi Lahiri, Alisha Chinai	6:41
3.	"Sheela Oh My Sheela"	Nazia Hassan, Zoheb Hassan	6:31
4.	"Jungle Queen"	Krish	5:24
5.	"Us Mein Kya Hai Jo"	Alisha Chinai	5:58
Total length:			30:37

== Home media ==
In 2021, the film became the point of contention between Goldmines Telefilms and Achla Sabharwal of Media International.
