= Jayasimha (1987 film) =

- VCD cover
- Directed by: P. Vasu
- Written by: P. Vasu
- Screenplay by: P. Vasu
- Produced by: K. C. N. Chandrashekhar; K. C. N. Mohan
- Starring: Vishnuvardhan; Mahalakshmi; Vajramuni; N. S. Rao
- Cinematography: D. V. Rajaram
- Edited by: K. Balu
- Music by: Vijay Anand
- Production company: Rajkamal Arts
- Release date: 21 May 1987
- Country: India
- Language: Kannada

Jayasimha is a 1987 Indian Kannada-language action drama film, directed by P. Vasu and produced by K. C. N. Chandrashekhar and K. C. N. Mohan. The film stars Vishnuvardhan, Mahalakshmi, Vajramuni and N. S. Rao. The film has musical score by Vijay Anand.

== Premise ==
Jayasimha, a forest officer, endeavours to stop animal poaching in a village he is transferred to. However, his efforts land him and his family in trouble.

== Cast ==
- Vishnuvardhan as Jayasimha
- Mahalakshmi as Hema
- Vajramuni as Punyakoti
- Janaki as Punyakoti's wife
- Lohithaswa as Hema's father
- Kanchana as Hema's mother
- Sundar Raj as Gowtham Punyakoti son
- Chi Ravishankar as Raja Punyakoti son
- N. S. Rao
- Umashree
- Sudheer
- Mysore Lokesh
- Master Amith
- Babu Singh
- V. R. Bhaskar
- Bob Christo
- Jayamalini
- Disco Shanthi
- Shani Mahadevappa
- Sridhar
- Bemel Somanna
- Janardhan

== Soundtrack ==
The music was composed by Vijay Anand.

No.	Song	Singers	Lyrics	Length (m:ss)
1	"Andha Andha"	S. P. Balasubrahmanyam, S. Janaki	Chi. Udaya Shankar	
2	"Appa Amma"	S. P. Balasubrahmanyam, S. Janaki	Chi. Udaya Shankar	
3	"Bigumaana"	S. P. Balasubrahmanyam, S. Janaki	Chi. Udaya Shankar	
4	"Jayasimha"	S. P. Balasubrahmanyam	Chi. Udaya Shankar	
5	"Kallalli Mullalli"	S. P. Balasubrahmanyam	Chi. Udaya Shankar	
6	"Naguvaaga Hoovanthe"	S. P. Balasubrahmanyam	Chi. Udaya Shankar	
