= Badla Aurat Ka =

2001 film by Thakur Tapasvi

- Directed by: Thakur Tapasvi
- Produced by: Thakur Tapasvi
- Release date: 16 February 2001
- Country: India
- Language: Hindi

Badla Aurat Ka is a Hindi-language action drama film directed and produced by Thakur Tapasvi. This film was released on 16 February 2001 under the banner of Tapasvi Productions House.

== Plot ==
The plot of the movie revolves with a life of an innocent village girl who is tied to bed spread eagle and gang raped by three goons. Those powerful trios smash her family, kill her father and friends. The girls is imprisoned for false charge of murder. Now she come out from jail and starts to take revenge on them.

== Cast ==
- Ranjeet
- Raza Murad
- Sahila Chadha
- Manik Irani
- Bharat Kapoor
- Mahesh Raj
- Huma Khan
- Aqbal Dhani
