= Ajay Vijay =

Indian Kannada-language action drama film

- Title card
- Directed by: A. T. Raghu
- Written by: Kunigal Nagabhushan (dialogue)
- Screenplay by: A. T. Raghu
- Story by: A. T. Raghu
- Produced by: M Mahesh Kumar
- Starring: Murali; Raghuveer; Chithra
- Cinematography: Padmakumar
- Edited by: S V Ramana Rao
- Music by: Yuvaraj
- Production company: Raghuveer Enterprises
- Release date: 9 February 1990
- Country: India
- Language: Kannada

Ajay Vijay is a 1990 Indian Kannada-language action drama film directed by A. T. Raghu and starring Murali and Raghuveer in the titular roles and Chithra. The film was dubbed in Tamil as Pudhiya Natchathiram with an added comedy track featuring Senthil and Master Haja Sheriff.

== Cast ==
- Murali as Ajay
- Raghuveer as Vijay
- Chithra
- Anitha
- Srinath
- Rajanand
- Sathyajith
- Shivaprakash
- Jaggesh
- Hema Chaudhary

== Production ==
Raghuveer, who was studying engineering, was suddenly interested in cinema, a decision that was supported by his father. Shobaraj's father helped make this film for Raghuveer since Shobaraj and Raghuveer were friends. Raghuveer made his debut through this film.

== Soundtrack ==
Ajay Vijay

Soundtrack album by Yuvaraj
- Released: 1990
- Genre: Feature film soundtrack
- Length: 19:27
- Language: Kannada
- Label: MRT Music
External audio
- Ajay Vijay – Jukebox on YouTube

The film has soundtrack composed by Yuvaraj. All lyrics are written by R. N. Jayagopal.

Track listing
No.	Title	Singer(s)	Length
1.	"Ee Gejjeya Naadake"	Mano, K.M. Kusuma	4:54
2.	"Sneha Thumbida"	Mano	4:45
3.	"Vega Otadha Vega"	S. P. Balasubrahmanyam	4:51
4.	"Gaganade Telide"	S. P. Balasubrahmanyam, K. S. Chithra	4:57
Total length:			19:27

== Box office ==
The film was a box office failure.
