= Aaj Ka Samson =

- Directed by: Kukoo Kapoor
- Written by: Kukoo Kapoor
- Produced by: Kukoo Kapoor
- Starring: Hemant Birje; Sahila Chadha
- Music by: Prem Gupta
- Release date: 4 January 1991
- Running time: 2 hours 3 min
- Country: India
- Language: Hindi

Aaj Ka Samson is a 1991 Indian Hindi-language romance drama film directed by Kukoo Kapoor, starring Hemant Birje, Sahila Chadha, Goga Kapoor and Puneet Issar. It is modern reworking of the Biblical tale of Samson and Delilah.

== Plot ==
This is the story of two friends who want to spend their lives together since childhood. But in future they become apart.

== Cast ==
- Hemant Birje as Samson
- Goga Kapoor as Manga
- Sahila Chadha as Juliet
- Kiran Kumar as Karan Singh
- Puneet Issar as Sanga
- Neeta Kapoor
- Vishal Dutt

== Soundtrack ==
Lyrics: Abhilash

#	Title	Singer(s)
1	"Aayi Hai Jabse Jawani"	Kavita Krishnamurthy, Usha Mangeshkar
2	"Har Janam Mera Hoga Tere Liye"	Alka Yagnik, Vinod Rathod
3	"Har Janam v2"	Poornima, Anupama Deshpande
4	"Le Le Tu Pyar De De Tu Pyar"	Suresh Wadkar, Kavita Krishnamurthy, Dilraj Kaur
5	"Mil Gaya Mil Gaya"	Alka Yagnik, Vinod Rathod
6	"Saath Tera Chahiye"	Kavita Krishnamurthy, Vinod Rathod
7	"Ek Bar Hans"	Asha Bhosle, Meenakshi
