= Vilichu Vilikettu =

- Poster
- Directed by: Sreekumaran Thampi
- Written by: Sreekumaran Thampi
- Produced by: Sreekumaran Thampi
- Starring: Mammootty; Shubha; Balan K. Nair; Mahalakshmi
- Cinematography: Dhananjayan
- Edited by: L. Bhoominathan
- Music by: Raveendran
- Production company: Sowparnika Productions
- Distributed by: Sowparnika Productions
- Release date: 18 October 1985
- Country: India
- Language: Malayalam

Vilichu Vilikettu is a 1985 Indian Malayalam film directed and produced by Sreekumaran Thampi, starring Mammootty, Shubha, Balan K. Nair and Mahalakshmi. The film features songs composed by Raveendran.

== Cast ==
- Mammootty as Vijayan
- Shubha as Mrs. Nair
- Balan K. Nair as N. N. K. Nair
- Mahalakshmi as Deepthi
- Mala Aravindan as Jacob
- Krishnachandran as Suresh
- Babu Namboothiri as D.F.O Muhammed Kutty
- Somasekharan Nair as Rema's father
- Santhakumari as Rema's mother
- Gomathi as Rema
- Babu Namboothiri as Muhammed
- T. G. Ravi as Babu
- Shivaji as Police Inspector
- Sukumari as Vijayan's mother

== Soundtrack ==
The music was composed by Raveendran and the lyrics were written by Sreekumaran Thampi.

No.	Song	Singers	Lyrics	Length (m:ss)
1	"Thushaaramuthirunnu"	K. J. Yesudas	Sreekumaran Thampi	
2	"Vilichathaaru"	K. J. Yesudas	Sreekumaran Thampi	
