= Raghuveer (actor) =

Indian actor and director (1967–2014)

- Born: 1967
- Died: 8 May 2014 (aged 46); BTM Layout, Bangalore, India
- Occupations: Actor, producer
- Years active: 1990–1995; 2011–2013
- Spouse(s): Sindhu Venkatasubramanian (m. 1992; div. 2003) Gowri (m. 2006)
- Children: 2
- Parent: Muni Yellappa

Raghuveer (1967 – 8 May 2014) was an Indian actor and producer in the Kannada film industry.

== Film career ==
Raghuveer came to the Kannada film industry as a hero through Ajay Vijay (1990) co-starring Murali. His next film, S. Narayan's Chaitrada Premanjali (1992), catapulted him to success. He then acted in Shrungara Kavya (1993) which proved to be commercially successful. However his subsequent films Kaaveri Theeradalli (1994), Naviloora Naidile (1995), Thungabhadra (1995) and Kaadina Kaggathalu did not do well. Raghuveer took a hiatus from films. Mugila Chumbana had a delayed release in 2013.

== Personal life ==
Raghuveer faced problems from his parents after marrying his frequent costar Sindhu. He later married Gowri and stayed out of cinema as per their wishes. He had a daughter named Shreya from his first marriage and a daughter named Moksha from his second marriage.

== Filmography ==
- All movies are in Kannada.

Year	Film	Role	Notes
1990	Ajay Vijay	Vijay	
1992	Chaitrada Premanjali	Prem	
1993	Shrungara Kavya	Shrungar	Also presenter
1993	Mouna Sangrama		
1993	Poorna Sangrama		
1993	Sri Durga Pooje		
1994	Nyayakkagi Saval		
1994	Kaveri Theeradalli		
1994	Hongirana		
1995	Thungabhadra		
1995	Naviloora Naidile		
2011	Uyyale		Special appearance
2013	Mugila Chumbana	Harish	Also producer and story writer

== Death ==
He was admitted to Sagar Apollo hospital in BTM Layout and died on 8 May 2014 night due to a heart attack. He is survived by his second wife Gowri and his two children. His first wife Sindhu had died in 2005.
