= Sindhu (actress) =

Indian actress

- Born: Sindhu Venkatasubramanian; 12 September 1971
- Died: 6 January 2005 (aged 33); Chennai, Tamil Nadu, India
- Occupation: Actress
- Years active: 1990-2005
- Spouse(s): Raghuveer (m.1995-2003); Rishi (m.2003; till her death)
- Children: Shreya
- Relatives: Sanjeev Venkat (brother); Preethi Sanjeev (sister-in-law)

Sindhu Venkatasubramanian was an Indian actress who appeared in predominantly Tamil films apart from a few Kannada films. She is the daughter of actress Manjula Vijaykumar's sister Shamala.

== Personal life ==
She married Raghuveer in 1995 and had a daughter named Shreya.

== Death ==
Sindhu picked up a lung infection during a door-to-door fund campaign in 2005 and died a few days later.

== Partial filmography ==
- Note: all films are in Tamil, unless otherwise noted.

Year	Film	Role	Notes
1989	Ponmana Selvan	Sindhu	
1990	Pulan Visaranai	Sindhu	
1990	Inaindha Kaigal	Geetha	
1990	Paattali Magan		
1990	Pondatti Thevai	Geetha	
1990	Puriyaadha Pudhir		Special appearance
1991	Sami Potta Mudichu	Neelaveni	
1991	Onnum Theriyadha Paapa	Suborna	
1992	Oor Mariyadhai	Kamachi	
1993	Gokulam	Mary	
1993	Shrungara Kavya	Kavya	Kannada film
1994	Seeman		
1995	Naviloora Naidhile		Kannada films
1995	Thungabhadra		Kannada films
1995	Chandralekha	Raziya	
1996	Parambarai	Maragatham	
1996	Namma Ooru Raasa		
1996	Gopala Gopala	Contestant on the reality show	Guest appearance
1997	Pistha		
1997	Suryavamsam	Shenbagam	
1997	Aahaa Enna Porutham	Subbu	
1998	Pooveli		
1998	Bobbili Vamsham		Telugu film
1999	Suriya Paarvai	Sindhu	
1999	Ponnu Veetukkaran		
1999	Unnaruge Naan Irundhal		
1999	Endrendrum Kadhal	Vasu's wife	
1999	Nenjinile	Karunakaran's sister	
2000	Kuberan	Kuberan's aunt	
2001	Krishna Krishna	Kalpana	
2001	Kunguma Pottu Gounder	School teacher	
2001	Lovely	Chandru's aunt	
2002	Namma Veetu Kalyanam		
2003	Anbe Anbe	Servant	
2003	Aalukkoru Aasai	Eshwari's stepmother	
2003	Chokka Thangam	Sundaram's sister	
2004	Giri	Pasupathy's wife	
2004	Jana	Deivanai	
2005	Ayya	Karuppusaamy's wife	

== Television ==
- 1999 Micro thodar
- 1999 Panchavarnakili
- 2002-2003 Penn
- 2002 Chinna Papa Periya Papa as Penang Philomena
- 2002-2004 Annamalai as Thulasi
- 2002-2003 Metti Oli as Sarala
- 2004-2005 "Agalya as
