= Kizhakku Africavil Sheela =

- Poster
- Directed by: Dwarakish
- Written by: Dwarakish, B. Shankar (dialogues)
- Produced by: Dwarakish
- Starring: Suresh; Sahila Chadha; Nizhalgal Ravi
- Cinematography: R. Devi Prasad
- Edited by: Gautham Raj
- Music by: Songs: Bappi Lahiri; Score: Vijay Anand
- Production company: Dwarakish Chitra
- Release date: 14 January 1987
- Country: India
- Language: Tamil

Kizhakku Africavil Sheela (transl. Sheela in East Africa) is a 1987 Indian Tamil-language fantasy adventure film produced and directed by Dwarakish. A remake of the 1986 Kannada film Africadalli Sheela and inspired by the works featuring Sheena, Queen of the Jungle, the film stars Suresh, Sahila Chadha, and Nizhalgal Ravi. It was released on 14 January 1987.

== Plot ==
A doctor named Ramu goes deep into the dark continent of Africa with his wife to help tribals. The couple are killed before that can be done, and their daughter is raised by apes, growing up to be Sheela. Ramu's father sends an expedition to search for his son. Unbeknownst to him, the members of this expedition have other goals. How one of the expedition's members checkmates their moves and does the rescue forms the rest of the plot.

== Cast ==
- Suresh
- Sahila Chadha as Sheela
- Senthil
- Nizhalgal Ravi as Ramu
- Charuhasan as Ramu's father
- Delhi Ganesh as Accountant
- Disco Shanti as Naagini
- Kanchana as Kumudha
- Kovai Sarala as Chikki Mukki
- Sudheer
- Omakuchi Narasimhan as Mathaguru (uncredited)

== Production ==
Kizhakku Africavil Sheela is a remake of the 1986 Kannada film Africadalli Sheela, and was also inspired by the works featuring Sheena, Queen of the Jungle. The film was shot predominantly in Zimbabwe. Directed by Dwarakish, it was also produced by him under his banner Dwarakish Chitra. Sahila Chadha, who starred as the eponymous Sheela in Kannada, reprised her role in the remake.

== Soundtrack ==
The soundtrack was composed by Bappi Lahiri and lyrics written by Vaali.

Track listing
No.	Title	Singer(s)	Length
1.	"Sheela Sheela"	Bappi Lahiri, Nazia Hassan
2.	"Sheela Oh My Sheela"	K. J. Yesudas, K. S. Chithra
3.	"Thakka Thimi Thana"	K. S. Chithra
4.	"Poovu Irukku Kayum Irukku"	Manjula
5.	"Semmeni Ponno"	K. J. Yesudas, K. S. Chithra

== Release and reception ==
Kizhakku Africavil Sheela was released on 14 January 1987. In a review dated 6 February 1987, The Indian Express felt the film largely resembled the "listless" television series Appu Aur Pappu as it was "stilted and trashy" like the dubbed Telugu action films that were common in that era. The reviewer criticised the characterisation of the villains, but praised the "catchy disco rhythms" composed by Bappi Lahiri, and Disco Shanti's "raw appeal". Jayamanmadhan of Kalki panned the film, saying it might have worked better in a language other than Tamil.
