= Aahaa Enna Porutham =

- Title card
- Directed by: C. Ranganathan
- Written by: C. Ranganathan
- Produced by: K. Balu
- Starring: Ramki; Goundamani; Sanghavi
- Cinematography: R. Raja Ratnam
- Edited by: D. Chandrasekaran
- Music by: Vidyasagar
- Production company: KB Films
- Release date: 19 September 1997
- Running time: 120 minutes
- Country: India
- Language: Tamil

Aahaa Enna Porutham (transl. Wow! What a compatibility) is a 1997 Indian Tamil-language comedy film directed by C. Ranganathan. The film stars Ramki, Goundamani and Sanghavi. It was released on 19 September 1997.

== Plot ==
Kunju Gounder is a respected village chief, who seeks his missing son. Panju Gounder, worked as a servant in Kunju Gounder's house and married his sister. Now, Panju Gounder tries hard to be respected by the villagers. Raja and his friend are fraud. Raja attempts to make himself out to be Kunju Gounder's son and falls in love with Kunju Gounder's daughter Sinthamani.

== Cast ==
- Ramki as Raja
- Goundamani
- Sanghavi as Sinthamani
- Senthil as Jack-an-Jill
- Balu Anand as Kunju Gounder
- Pandu as Panju Gounder
- Sindhu as Subbu, Kunju Gounder's wife
- Jyothi Meena
- Kavitha
- Shanthi Williams as Mangalam
- K. S. Jayalakshmi as Jack-an-Jill's mother
- Singamuthu
- Omakuchi Narasimhan

== Soundtrack ==
The music was composed by Vidyasagar, with lyrics written by P. R. C. Bhalu. Roshini made her debut as a playback singer through this film.

Song	Singer(s)	Duration
"Baghdad Perazhage"	Mano, Vidyasagar, Swarnalatha	4:31
"Coimbatore Kolunthu"	Gopal, Vidyasagar	4:32
"Kanaguruvi"	Anuradha Sriram, Kollangudi Karuppayee, Roshini	4:20
"Sinthamani Sinthamani"	Hariharan, S. Janaki	4:35
"Vulakku Le Le"	Gopal, Swarnalatha	4:23

== Reception ==
Kalki praised Goundamani's humour and parodying village cliches of Tamil cinema and Vidyasagar's music but felt could not forgive for having dragged it somewhere without understanding what it was trying to say, how everything had been bent, twisted, and twisted and concluded saying at the end they only made us scream 'Ayyo enna aruvai' (Oh what an atrocity).
