= Africadalli Sheela =

1986 film by Dwarakish

- VCD cover
- Directed by: Dwarakish
- Written by: Dwarakish
- Produced by: Dwarakish
- Starring: Charan Raj; Sahila Chadha
- Cinematography: R. Deviprasad
- Edited by: Goutham Raju
- Music by: Bappi Lahiri; Vijay Anand (background score)
- Production company: Dwarakish Chitra
- Release date: 27 May 1986
- Running time: 105 minutes
- Country: India
- Language: Kannada

Africadalli Sheela ( transl. Sheela in Africa) is a 1986 Indian Kannada-language fantasy adventure film, written, directed and produced by Dwarakish. Made on the similar lines as the Hollywood film Sheena, the film was extensively shot in the forest ranges in the African continent. This film was the first Indian film to have been shot in the African forests. The film featured Charan Raj and Sahila in the lead roles, along with Dwarakish, Srinivasa Murthy and Kalyan Kumar in supporting roles. The music was composed by Bappi Lahiri in his Kannada debut.

The film was made on a large scale and was a box office failure. Despite this, Dwarakish remade the film in Tamil as Kizhakku Africavil Sheela and in Hindi as Sheela with Sahila reprising her role in both versions.

== Cast ==
- Charan Raj as Shankar
- Sahila Chadha as Sheela
- Kalyan Kumar as Rao Bahaddur
- Ranjeeta as Sheela's mother
- Srinivasa Murthy as Ramu
- Thoogudeepa Srinivas as Raacha
- Sudheer
- Disco Shanti
- Kovai Sarala as Chikki Mukki
- Reena Morar (credited as Baby Reena Morar)
- Kanchana
- Manik Irani as Abdul
- Anand Balaraj
- Jack Gaud
- Dwarakish as Naayaka

== Production ==
Dwarakish made this film when he was not doing well financially with a bank lending him money overnight.

== Soundtrack ==
All the songs are composed and scored by Bappi Lahiri. This film marked the entry of singer K. S. Chithra to the Kannada cinema. Writing for Deccan Herald in a 2001 article, a reviewer noted that Lahiri's rendition of "Sheela Sheela" was "easily one of his best efforts in Kannada for its sheer slow pace and noiselessnes".

Sl No	Song title	Singer(s)	Lyricist
1	"Sheela Sheela"	Bappi Lahiri, Nazia Hassan	Chi. Udaya Shankar
2	"Thakka Dhimi Thana"	Manjula Gururaj	Chi. Udaya Shankar
3	"Hey Hennu Illade"	Manjula Gururaj	R. N. Jayagopal
4	"Thampada Tholu"	K. J. Yesudas, Manjula Gururaj	R. N. Jayagopal
5	"Sheela O My Sheela"	K. J. Yesudas, K. S. Chithra	Chi. Udaya Shankar
