= Oor Panchayathu =

- Title card
- Directed by: Mahendran
- Screenplay by: Mahendran
- Story by: John Roshan
- Starring: Pandiarajan; Mahalakshmi
- Cinematography: Kichas
- Edited by: Maddan
- Music by: S. P. Balasubrahmanyam
- Production company: Muthamil Movie
- Release date: 29 May 1992
- Country: India
- Language: Tamil

Oor Panchayathu (transl. Town Panchayat) is 1992 Indian Tamil-language film written and directed by Mahendran. The film stars Pandiarajan and Mahalakshmi. It was released on 29 May 1992.

== Plot ==
Siva is the foster son of a respectable village elder. The village elder wishes to get his granddaughter married to Siva. But Siva incurs the wrath of the village elder's son-in-law when the villagers unanimously elect him as head of the village panchayat. The anger turns into suspicion when Siva gives shelter to a woman named Thamarai and her new-born baby. Siva's kindness is misinterpreted, and even his lover shuns him. The wrinkles in the relationship get ironed out when Thamarai's husband returns to take his wife and child away. But the rift between Siva and the son-in-law widens and culminates in murder.

== Cast ==
- Pandiarajan as Siva
- Mahalakshmi as Sangeetha
- V. K. Ramasamy as the village elder
- S. N. Parvathy
- Sulakshana as Thamarai
- Kokila
- Hema
- Bhanu
- Srikanth
- Y. G. Mahendran
- Charle
- Rajasekar
- Karikol Raju
- Vellai Subbaiah

== Soundtrack ==
The music was composed by S. P. Balasubrahmanyam.

Track listing
No.	Title	Singer(s)	Length
1.	"Kaatrum Poovum"	S. P. Balasubrahmanyam, S. P. Sailaja
2.	"Matha Kovil Deepam"	S. Janaki
3.	"Paruthi Punnakku Da"	S. P. Balasubrahmanyam
4.	"Sari Sari Sangeetha"	S. P. Balasubrahmanyam
5.	"Sithadai Kattikitu"	S. P. Sailaja

== Release and reception ==
Oor Panchayathu was released on 29 May 1992. RSP of The Indian Express derided the film, saying, "Mahendran who has handled the screen play, dialogue and direction does not seem to have applied his skills. He has miserably failed to make the narration interesting."
