= Uyyale (2011 film) =

Indian Kannada-language romantic drama film

- VCD cover
- Directed by: S Dinesh
- Written by: Hrudaya Shiva (dialogues)
- Screenplay by: S Dinesh
- Story by: S Dinesh
- Starring: Prabhu; Shilpa; Ramesh Bhat
- Cinematography: G Renukumar; M R Seenu
- Edited by: S K Nagendra Urs
- Music by: Dj Ricky
- Production company: Manoj Entertainers
- Release date: 18 March 2011
- Country: India
- Language: Kannada

Uyyale is a 2011 Indian Kannada-language romantic drama film directed by S Dinesh and starring Prabhu, Shilpa, and Ramesh Bhat.

== Cast ==
- Prabhu as Prabhu
- Shilpa as Divya
- Raghuveer in a cameo appearance
- Roopika
- Ramesh Bhat as Chandrappa
- Padmaja Rao
- Doddanna
- M. S. Umesh
- Jai Jagadish
- Bank Janardhan
- Tennis Krishna
- Dingri Nagaraj
- Ramesh Pandit
- Mohan Juneja
- Mico Nagaraj
- Shille Manjunath

== Music ==
The music was composed by Dj Ricky.

Track listing
No.	Title	Lyrics	Singer(s)	Length
1.	"Hrudhayavu Ninnade"	Jayanth Kaikini	Sonu Nigam	3:51
2.	"Chinna Ni Nanna"	Jamkandi Shivu	Kunal Ganjawala, Shreya Ghoshal	5:05
3.	"Modamodalu"	Hrudayashiva	Karthik	5:27
4.	"Ee Manasu"	K. Kalyan	Kailash Kher	4:57
5.	"Hagalu Ninnade"	Jayanth Kaikini	Udit Narayan	5:03
6.	"Naguve Naguve"	S. Dinesh	Sabesh	3:57
7.	"Suvvale Suvvale"	Jamkandi Shivu	Kailash Kher	5:25
Total length:				33:45

== Reception ==
A critic from Bangalore Mirror wrote, "Agreed, the film does break the stereotype, but that alone does not make it a good watch. In a nutshell, the film ends up as an average attempt". A critic from IANS wrote, "Uyyale is a sincere attempt by director Dinesh, who shows promise. But the film belongs to Ramesh Bhat as much as to Dinesh".
