= Rasathi Varum Naal =

- Directed by: Rafi
- Written by: Rafi; N. S. Ramesh Khanna (dialogues)
- Produced by: G. Sridevi Shahul
- Starring: Nizhalgal Ravi; Kasthuri; Balambika
- Cinematography: Kabir Lal
- Edited by: Murali; Ramaiah
- Music by: Vijay Anand
- Production company: Raja Durga Combines
- Release date: 13 December 1991
- Running time: 135 minutes
- Country: India
- Language: Tamil

Rasathi Varum Naal (transl. The day of the Rasathi's arrival) is a 1991 Indian Tamil-language horror film directed by Maniyan Sivabalan. The film stars Nizhalgal Ravi, Kasthuri and Balambika, with Nassar, Radha Ravi, Thyagu and Rajeshkumar playing supporting roles. It was released on 13 December 1991.

== Plot ==
Radha (Kasthuri) lives a luxurious life with her widower father Rajasekhar (Nassar) in a palace. She will marry the Inspector of Police Vijay (Nizhalgal Ravi) after finishing her studies. During a college tour in Pachaimalai Hills, Radha is saved from a near-drowning experience by her college mates. She then finds a pendant in her pocket and she brings it home.

Radha starts to have creepy nightmares in the night, and her pet dog dies in a mysterious way. One night, a spirit flees from the pendant and it enters into Radha's body. The possessed spirit of the girl-victim Rasathi (Balambika) wants to take revenge for a gang-rape that happened 19 years ago; the tormentors were Rajasekhar and his three friends Gowri (Radha Ravi), Kabali (Thyagu) and Rajeshkumar (Rajeshkumar). The possessed Radha mercilessly kills Rajasekhar's friends one by one. Vijay, who is in charge of the case, finds out that Radha is the killer. What transpires next forms the rest of the story.

== Cast ==
- Nizhalgal Ravi as Inspector Vijay
- Kasthuri as Radha
- Balambika as Rasathi
- Nassar as Rajasekhar
- Radha Ravi as Gowri
- Thyagu as Kabali
- Rajeshkumar as Rajeshkumar
- A. K. Veerasamy as Rasathi's grandfather
- Mayilsamy as Pazhani
- Marthandan as Muthu
- Vasuki as Visalam
- Vaman Malini as Radha's friend

== Soundtrack ==
The soundtrack was composed by Vijay Anand, with lyrics written by Vaali.

Song	Singer(s)	Duration
"Mamaa Mamaa"	K. S. Chithra, Chorus	4:17
"Mukkona Sakkarathil"	K. S. Chithra, Chorus	5:43
"Naan Pogum"	K. S. Chithra	4:57
"Vaa Kanmani"	S. P. Balasubrahmanyam, K. S. Chithra	4:52

== Release and reception ==
N. Krishnaswamy of The Indian Express called the film "more-or-less a business-like desi thriller". The film was dubbed in Telugu as Durgamma in 1992.
