= Mahalakshmi (Kannada actress) =

Indian actress

- Occupations: Actress; director
- Years active: 1982–1993; 2021–present
- Parents: A. V. M. Rajan (father); Pushpalatha (mother)

Mahalakshmi is an Indian actress known for her work in Kannada cinema. She has also appeared in Tamil, Telugu and Malayalam films. Some of Mahalakshmi's notable films include Baare Nanna Muddina Rani (1990), Hendthighelbedi (1989), Parashuram (1989), Samsara Nouke (1989), Jayasimha (1987) in Kannada and Poo Manam (1989), Muthal Vasantham (1986), Nandri (1984) in Tamil, Vilichu Vilikettu (1985), Rangam (1985) in Malayalam and Rendu Jella Sita (1983) in Telugu. Mahalakshmi retired from acting in the early 1990s, before making a comeback after 30 years with a Kannada film titled TRP Rama (2023), and a television serial Kaveri Kannada Medium (2023–2025).

Mahalakshmi is the daughter of actors A. V. M. Rajan and Pushpalatha. She is married and currently living in Chennai. She has two daughters, one has studied aeronautical engineering and the other architecture.

== Filmography ==
Mahalakshmi has appeared in the following films.

=== Films ===
Year	Title	Role	Language	Notes
1982	Rani Theni	Parvathi	Tamil	
1983	Ilayapiravigal		Tamil	
1983	Ananda Bhairavi		Telugu	
1983	Rendu Jella Sita	Seetha	Telugu	
1984	Baddi Bangaramma	Dhanalakshmi	Kannada	
1984	Pooja Phala	Meena	Kannada	
1984	Aparanji		Kannada	
1984	Nandri	Saratha	Tamil	
1984	Devi Sri Devi		Tamil	
1985	Mayadari Maridi		Telugu	
1985	Kumkuma Tanda Sowbhagya		Kannada	
1985	Swabhimana	Vani	Kannada	
1985	Angadikkappurathu	Neena	Malayalam	
1985	Vilichu Vilikettu	Deepthi	Malayalam	
1985	Rangam		Malayalam	
1986	Lancha Lancha Lancha		Kannada	
1986	Madhuve Madu Tamashe Nodu	Gowri	Kannada	
1986	Prema Jala	Shobha	Kannada	
1986	Samsarada Guttu	Kaveri	Kannada	
1986	Tiger		Kannada	
1986	Muthal Vasantham		Tamil	
1986	Kotigadu		Telugu	
1986	Kutra	Lavanya	Telugu	
1987	Bhadrakali		Kannada	
1987	Jayasimha	Hema	Kannada	
1987	Mr. Raaja		Kannada	
1987	Thayi Kotta Thali		Kannada	
1987	Enga Veettu Ramayanan		Tamil	
1988	Brahma Vishnu Maheshwara		Kannada	
1988	Matru Devobhava		Kannada	
1988	Nava Bharatha		Kannada	
1988	Nee Nanna Daiva	Mahalakshmi	Kannada	
1988	Praja Prabhuthva		Kannada	
1989	Gagana	Devyani	Kannada	Special appearance
1989	Hendthighelbedi	Chitra	Kannada	
1989	Idu Saadhya	Kavitha	Kannada	
1989	Jacky		Kannada	
1989	Maha Yuddha		Kannada	
1989	Padmavyuha		Kannada	
1989	Parashuram	Malini	Kannada	
1989	Samsara Nouke	Usha	Kannada	
1989	Poo Manam		Tamil	
1990	Baare Nanna Muddina Rani		Kannada	
1990	Ivalentha Hendthi		Kannada	
1990	Swarna Samsara	Sukanya	Kannada	
1991	Antharangada Mrudanga		Kannada	
1991	Durgashtami		Kannada	
1991	Maneli Ili Beedeeli Huli		Kannada	
1991	Mathru Bhagya	Seetha	Kannada	
1992	Oor Panchayathu		Tamil	
2023	TRP Rama	Lakshmamma	Kannada	

=== Television ===
Year	Title	Role	Notes	Ref.
2023–2025	Kaveri Kannada Medium	Pramoda Devi		

== See also ==
- List of people from Tamil Nadu
- List of Indian film actresses
