= Maanagara Kaaval =

- Theatrical release poster
- Directed by: M. Thyagarajan
- Written by: M. Thyagarajan; Liaquat Ali Khan (dialogues)
- Produced by: M. Saravanan; M. Balasubramaniam
- Starring: Vijayakanth; Suma
- Cinematography: Shiva
- Edited by: G. Jayachandran
- Music by: Chandrabose
- Production company: AVM Productions
- Release date: 28 June 1991
- Running time: 150 minutes
- Country: India
- Language: Tamil

Maanagara Kaaval (transl. Metropolitan Police) is a 1991 Indian Tamil-language political action thriller film directed by M. Thyagarajan. The film stars Vijayakanth and Suma. It is the 150th film of AVM Productions. The film was released on 28 June 1991.

== Plot ==
Ashok Mehta, a senior politician, is enraged when a junior Roopavathi is made the Prime Minister of India. Though he pretends to accept his party's decision, he secretly plots to eliminate her. Meanwhile, a high-profile officer is killed in Delhi by a professional killer, Robin and Vidya witnesses the murder.

Vidya arrives in Chennai for a dance event and falls in love with Subash, an honest IPS officer who is mourning the loss of his beloved sister. He manages to impress Roopavathi by arresting Vannai Varathan, an MP from her party, for creating social unrest. She gives him a green signal, and Varathan is arrested. Varathan swears revenge. As the story progresses, Subash begins to develop feelings for Vidya.

Robin, who arrives in Chennai, tries to murder Vidya. But Subash catches him, and under the orders of his superior, IG Jayaprakash, he accompanies Robin to Delhi so as to hand him over to the Delhi police. Vidya also joins them. Robin manages to escape with the help of his gang, who pretend to be the concerned police officers, and Subash is suspended. However, Subash swears to find the culprits and stays in Vidya's house in Delhi. He is confronted by Gowtham IPS who was supposed to have taken Robin from the airport and accuses him of aiding an anarchist. Subash, on the contrary, believes Gowtham to be a mole.

After spotting and chasing Robin, Subash, much to his horror, comes across his dead sister Seetha. She reveals the circumstances that forced her to land there and also says that Gowtham is her husband. Parallel to these incidents, it is shown that Robin was hired by Metha to assassinate Roopavathi. The person whom the latter murdered in the beginning of the movie was Roopavathi, Chief Security Officer. Mehta is indirectly helped by Vannai Varathan, who is out of the prison.

Subash discovers that the Inspector General of the Delhi police is the actual mole. However, before he can extract more information, the IG is killed. With the help of Gowtham, Subash manages to inform Roopavathi about Mehta's treachery. Still, she is unable to take action against him due to his support and clean image in the party. Robin and his associates kidnaps and imprisons Gowtham, Subash and Seetha. After a prolonged struggle, Subash frees himself and kills Robin and Mehta while an attempt was made on the life of Roopavathi.

== Cast ==
- Vijayakanth as ACP Subhash IPS
- Suman Ranganathan as Vidhya
- M. N. Nambiar as IG Jayaprakash
- Lakshmi as PM Roopavathi
- Nassar as Gowtham IPS
- Vaishnavi as Seetha
- Anandaraj as Robin
- P. J. Sarma as Ashok Mehta
- Dubbing Janaki as Subhash & Seetha Mother
- Senthil as Alagappan
- Thiyagu as MP Vannai Varathan
- Chinni Jayanth as Seenu
- LIC Narasimhan as Sivasankar
- Ganga as Suresh
- Baby Vichitra as Seetha's daughter
- Ponnambalam as Fighter
- Thalapathy Dinesh as Fighter
- Murali Kumar as Police Inspector

== Production ==
Maanagara Kaaval was partially filmed at Palam airport, New Delhi. It was the 150th film produced by AVM. The film became Thyagarajan's final directorial credit before his death in 2021.

== Soundtrack ==
The music was composed by Chandrabose, with lyrics by Vaali.

Song	Singers	Length
"Kaalai Neram"	K. J. Yesudas	04:21
"Thodi Raagam Paadava"	K. J. Yesudas, K. S. Chithra	04:57
"Thiruvarur Thanga Thear"	S. P. Sailaja	03:59
"Vandikkaran Sontha Ooru"	S. P. Balasubrahmanyam, S. P. Sailaja	05:03
"Thalai Vari Poochudum"	S. P. Balasubrahmanyam	04:36

== Reception ==
N. Krishnaswamy of The Indian Express wrote, "Even a film that sheet anchors itself on thrilling action, [..] in credibility by neat characterisation [..] but Maanagara Kaaval doesnt waste time on these". C. R. K. of Kalki appreciated the film primarily for the cast performances.

== Bibliography ==
- Saravanan, M. (2013) [2005]. AVM 60 Cinema (in Tamil) (3rd ed.). Rajarajan Pathippagam. OCLC 1158347612.
