= Hendthighelbedi =

- VCD cover
- Directed by: Dinesh Babu
- Written by: Dinesh Babu
- Produced by: Shobha Prakash
- Starring: Anant Nag; Mahalakshmi; Sundar Krishna Urs; Devaraj
- Cinematography: Dinesh Babu
- Edited by: Suresh Urs
- Music by: Vijay Anand
- Production company: Rakshitha Films
- Distributed by: Rajassu Films Pvt. Ltd. Bhuvaneshwari Pictures; Chandrashekhara Movies
- Release date: 27 July 1989
- Running time: 146 minutes
- Country: India
- Language: Kannada

Hendthighelbedi ( transl. Don't Tell to Wife) is a 1989 Indian Kannada-language comedy thriller film, written and directed by Dinesh Babu. It stars Anant Nag and Mahalakshmi. The supporting cast features Sundar Krishna Urs, Devaraj, Tara and Bangalore Nagesh. The film's score and soundtrack were composed by Vijay Anand.

Set in Madikeri, in the Kodagu region of Karnataka, the film tells the story of how Anand (Nag), a wealthy businessman and a meek husband of Chitra (Mahalakshmi), goes about tackling with double murder that he is wrongly accused of, by his friend and the culprit Srinivas (Urs). The film, upon release, received favorable reviews. At the 37th Filmfare Awards South, Nag was awarded the Best Actor.

== Cast ==
- Anant Nag as Anand Somashekhar Somavarpet
- Mahalakshmi as Chitra
- Sundar Krishna Urs as Inspector Srinivas
- Devaraj as CID Inspector Prathap
- Bangalore Nagesh as Thimma
- Tara as Inspector Srinivas's wife
- Anjali Sudhakar as Thimma's wife
- Disco Shanti as Shanti
- Sihi Kahi Geetha as Sarala
- Sarvamangala
- Roopa Prabhakar (credited as Baby Roopa) as Roopa
- Keerthi (credited Baby Keerthi) as Putti

== Soundtrack ==
The music was composed by Vijay Anand and the audio was released on Lahari Music label.

Track listing
No.	Title	Lyrics	Singer(s)	Length
1.	"Madhura Maya"	Su. Rudramurthy Shastry	S. P. Balasubrahmanyam, K. S. Chithra
2.	"Rathri Bhaya"	R. N. Jayagopal	S. P. Balasubrahmanyam
3.	"Nambu Nanna Nalle"	Shyamsundar Kulkarni	S. P. Balasubrahmanyam
4.	"Neene Muride Baalanu"	Su. Rudramurthy Shastry	K. S. Chithra

== Awards ==
37th Filmfare Awards South

- Best Actor — Anant Nag
