= C. Ranganathan =

Indian film director and screenwriter

- Born: 10 January 1966 (age 60)
- Occupations: Director, actor
- Years active: 1991–present

C. Ranganathan is an Indian film director, actor, and screenwriter who has worked on Tamil films. He made his directorial debut with the 1996 romantic drama film, Coimbatore Mappillai starring Vijay and Sanghavi.

== Career ==
Ranganathan is a distant relative of R. Sundarrajan and worked as an assistant director under him and S. A. Chandrasekhar. He initially began his career as actor portraying lead role in Oyilattam (1991) directed by Sundarrajan. He then became a director and made three consecutive successful Tamil films between 1996 and 1997 with the Vijay-starrer Coimbatore Mappillai, Tata Birla and Aahaa Enna Porutham all ending up as profitable ventures. By late 1997, he had started work on a new film titled Indru Mudhal Happy featuring Jayaram, Goundamani and Senthil in leading roles. By April 1998, the cast of the film was changed to include Pandiarajan and Preetha, though the film did not complete production.

He then launched another project titled Saamy Koduththa Varam in August 1998, with Napolean, Vignesh and Preetha starring. Despite a grand launch event, the film did not finish production. Similarly the film, Love Pannunga Sir featuring Livingston and Preetha, did not progress despite being announced in mid-1998. In 2001, he began another project titled Vandharu Jeicharu with television actor Akash and Uma. However, despite beginning production, the film also failed to finish.

As offers to make films began to get difficult, Ranganathan moved on to make television serials and notably worked with K. Bhagyaraj in the making of Vilakku Vacha Nerathula.

== Filmography ==
=== Films ===
==== Director ====
Year	Film	Notes
1996	Coimbatore Mappillai	
1996	Tata Birla	
1997	Aahaa Enna Porutham	

==== Actor ====
- Note: all films are in Tamil, unless otherwise noted.

Year	Film	Role	Notes
1991	Oyilattam	Chinnaswamy	Lead actor
2011	Sattapadi Kutram		
2014	Lingaa	Security guard	
2015	Vasuvum Saravananum Onna Padichavanga	Doctor	
2015	Athiradi		
2016	Nayyapudai		
2016	Kotigobba 2	Bus passenger	Kannada film
2016	Mudinja Ivana Pudi	Bus passenger	
2017	Ivan Thanthiran	Professor	
2018	Jai Simha		Telugu film
2018	Torchlight		
2020	Darbar	Lilly's father	
2021	Annaatthe	Potential groom's father	Uncredited role
2022	Yaanai	Marriage broker	
2023	Chandramukhi 2	Lakshmi's father	
2024	Rathnam	Rathnam's Uncle	
2024	Indian 2	Muthuraj	
2024	Dhil Raja		
2025	Madharas Mafia Company		
2026	TN 2026	Film Director	

=== Television ===
==== As actor ====
Year	Title	Role	Channel
2016	Ponnunjal	Naveenetha Krishnan	Sun TV
2018	Vaani Rani	Haneef	Sun TV
2018–2019	Perazhagi	Paramashivam	Colors Tamil
2018–2020	Kalyana Parisu 2	Ramanathan	Sun TV
2021	Abhi Tailor	VKR	Colors Tamil
2021–2022	Chithiram Pesuthadi		Zee Tamil
2022	Ramany vs Ramany 3.0	Web series; Appeared in episode 9 - Unwanted guest	Aha Tamil
2022–2023	Chellamma	Dr. Rajendar	Star Vijay
2026-present	Palayathu Amman		Jaya TV

==== As director ====
Year	Title	Channel
2007	Vandhana Thandhana	Kalaignar TV
2009-2010	Comedy Colony	Jaya TV
2009–2011	Vilakku Vacha Nerathula	Kalaignar TV
