= Oorukku Upadesam =

1984 Tamil film

- Poster
- Directed by: S. P. Muthuraman
- Screenplay by: Kuriakose Ranga
- Based on: Sirithu Konde Azhugirom by Visu
- Produced by: K. S. Srinivasan; S. Sivaraman
- Starring: S. Ve. Shekher; Urvasi; Visu
- Cinematography: Babu
- Edited by: R. Vittal
- Music by: Vijay Anand
- Production company: Vasan Brothers
- Release date: 24 February 1984
- Running time: 131 minutes
- Country: India
- Language: Tamil

Oorukku Upadesam (/upəðeɪsəm/ transl. Lecture to people) is a 1984 Indian Tamil-language film directed by S. P. Muthuraman. The film stars S. Ve. Shekher, Urvasi and Visu, with Delhi Ganesh, Charuhasan, Dilip, Subhakar, Pushpalatha and Vanitha in supporting roles. It is an adaptation of Visu's 1974 play Sirithu Konde Azhugirom (transl. We laugh as we cry). The film was released on 24 February 1984. It was remade in Kannada the same year as Indina Ramayana.

== Plot ==
Pulavar Ponnambalam conducts religious programmes lecturing the public on the Indian epic Ramayana. He and his wife Kausalya have named their three sons after the characters in the Ramayana, namely Raman, Lakshmanan and Bharathan. Ponnambalam's brother Sankaran who has lost his wife and daughter in a car accident, lives with Ponnambalam and his family. Sankaran is a drunkard.

Lakshmanan loves Bhanu, and he asks Raman to help him out. Raman talks to his parents about getting a daughter-in-law for the house, but his parents think Raman is referring to his own marriage, and fix his marriage. Raman's wedding is arranged with Justice Vedalingam's daughter Janaki. After the wedding, Janaki notices Sankaran drinking every day. Nevertheless, she takes care of him, and serves him food when he comes home late. Sankaran is reminded of his daughter when he sees Janaki, and seeing the love and affection of a daughter from Janaki, Sankaran turns over a new leaf.

Meanwhile, Bharathan who works in Jamshedpur, has missed his brother's wedding, as he is travelling all over India for office work. When Bharathan returns home on vacation, and sees Janaki for the first time, he is shocked. He tells his parents that Janaki used to work as a prostitute in Hyderabad. His parents are also shocked and start ill-treating Janaki, but they ignore the fact that Bharathan has visited many prostitutes in different cities, and display anger towards him. Finally they send Janaki back to Vedalingam's house, and since Raman is afraid of his parents, he doesn't say anything. But Sankaran and Lakshmanan feel something is wrong and both decide to investigate. Sankaran promises Janaki that he will find out what is happening, and solve the problem.

Sankaran and Lakshmanan travel to Hyderabad carrying Janaki's photo and question different brothel owners about the girl in the photo. One of the brothel owners says she has seen her before and that she was sold to someone in Bombay. Sankaran and Lakshmanan travel to Bombay and after doing some searching around, they finally find a prostitute that looks identical to Janaki. She says her name is Madhavi, and that many years ago, her father who was a lawyer in Ambur made her mother Mangala Devi pregnant and left her without marrying her. She says that after Mangala Devi died, she searched for her father, but couldn't find him. She shows them a photo of her father and her mother. Sankaran realises that the man in the photo is a young looking Vedalingam.

Sankaran takes Madhavi to meet Vedalingam, and Vedalingam acknowledges she is his daughter, but refuses to accept her as his daughter in society, as that would spoil his image. Sankaran and Lakshmanan also realise that before they reveal Madhavi's story to Ponnambalam's family and send Janaki there, they need to make sure that Ponnambalam and his family will accept Janaki with a whole heart. So they decide to play a game. They ask Madhavi to dress like Janaki and live with her father for some time and take him to visit different temples for a few weeks, for a change of mind. They arrange fake police to tell Ponnambalam and Kausalya that Janaki killed herself. After a few days, they ask Janaki to dress like Madhavi, and take her to Ponnambalam's house. Ponnambalam, Bharathan, Raman and Kausalya are shocked to see Madhavi, and realise that they made a mistake of accusing Janaki. Finally Sankaran suggests that for all the sins that they had done, they need to get Madhavi married to one of their three sons. After much hesitation, Ponnambalam and Kausalya agree. Since Bharathan had already slept with Madhavi in the Hyderabad brothel, he volunteers to marry Madhavi. During the wedding, the real Madhavi brings Vedalingam and comes and stops the wedding between Bharathan and Janaki. Vedalingam accepts that he cheated Mangala Devi many years ago, and both Janaki and Madhavi are his daughters, and that he takes full responsibility for Madhavi's ruined life. Janaki and Raman are re-united. Madhavi says she cannot marry Bharathan as she feels she does not belong in their family, and that she needs to spend some time alone to think what to do with her life. She thanks Sankaran for all his help, and leaves with her father. Lakshmanan and Bhanu also get married, on the same wedding premises.

== Cast ==
- S. Ve. Shekher as Raman
- Urvasi as Janaki and Madhavi
- Visu as Sankaran
- Delhi Ganesh as Pulavar Ponnambalam
- Charuhasan as Justice Vedalingam
- Dilip as Bharathan
- Subhakar as Lakshmanan
- Typist Gopu as Bhanu's father
- Narasimhan as a rich client in Bombay's brothel
- Pushpalatha as Kausalya
- Vanitha as Bhanu

== Production ==
Oorukku Upadesam is based on Visu's 1974 play Sirithu Konde Azhugirom. The film's screenplay was written by his brother-in-law Kuriakose Ranga. A scene was shot at a house at Venus Colony.

== Soundtrack ==
The soundtrack was composed by Vijay Anand, previously a stage play composer. This became his film debut after his first signed film, Naanayam Illatha Naanayam, was delayed.

Track listing
| No. | Title | Lyrics | Singer(s) | Length |
|---|---|---|---|---|
| 1. | "Thara Vaa" | Vairamuthu | Vani Jairam |
| 2. | "Hey Raja" | Muthulingam | S. P. Balasubrahmanyam, S. Janaki |
| 3. | "Aasai Undaguthu" | Idhayachandran | S. Janaki |
| 4. | "Kathaiya" | Vairamuthu | S. P. Balasubrahmanyam |

== Critical reception ==
Kalki positively reviewed the film for its story. Balumani of Anna praised acting, music, dialogues, cinematography and editing and noted the story flows smoothly until the break, then it gets a little confusing and called the ending lacklustre.
