= Muthal Vasantham =

- Title card
- Directed by: Manivannan
- Screenplay by: Manivannan
- Story by: P. Kalaimani
- Produced by: P. Kalaimani
- Starring: Pandiyan; Chandrasekar; Ramya Krishnan; Mahalakshmi
- Cinematography: A. Sabapathy
- Edited by: K. Gowthaman
- Music by: Ilaiyaraaja
- Production company: Everest Films
- Release date: 22 May 1986
- Country: India
- Language: Tamil

Muthal Vasantham (transl. The first spring) is a 1986 Indian Tamil-language masala film, directed by Manivannan and produced by P. Kalaimani, who also wrote the film's story. It stars Pandiyan, Chandrasekar, Ramya Krishnan and Mahalakshmi, with Sathyaraj in a major role. The film, released on 22 May 1986, was remade in Telugu as Asthulu Anthasthulu (1988) and in Hindi by Manivannan as Hum Bhi Insaan Hain (1989).

== Plot ==
The rivalry between Kunguma Pottu Gounder and Vettaikkara Gounder splits a village into two. A villager who runs a boat, always fights against their dictatorship and tries to protect the villagers. An innocent orphan enters the village and becomes a man servant in Vettaikkara Gounder's house. Vettaikkara Gounder's only daughter falls for him. Vettaikkara Gounder learns it, becomes furious and whips him. With the help of the boatman, the lovers elope. But they get caught, and Vettaikkara Gounder extracts vengeance by severing the boatman's arms. He also accuses his man servant of abduction and attempted rape.

In the court, Vettaikkara Gounder's daughter lies under oath that the man servant is guilty of the accusations made by her father. After having served his term in jail, the man servant returns to the village seeking vengeance. At the same time, he is confronted by Vettaikkara Gounder's rival Kunguma Pottu Gounder. Will Kunguma Pottu Gounder use the man servant to settle his rivalry against Vettaikkara Gounder? Will the lovers unite?

== Cast ==
- Pandiyan
- Chandrasekar
- Ramya Krishnan
- Mahalakshmi
- Vinu Chakravarthy
- Malaysia Vasudevan as Vettaikkara Gounder
- Vennira Aadai Moorthy
- Y. Vijaya
- Chinni Jayanth
- Peeli Sivam
- Typist Gopu
- Sathyaraj as Kunguma Pottu Gounder
- Anuja (uncredited)

== Production ==
P. Kalaimani approached Manobala to direct Muthal Vasantham; however the partners of Kalaimani were uninterested in having Manobala as director and replaced him with Manivannan. The filming began at Vauhini Studios in 1984. The filming began on 21 April 1985 at Chennai and was also held at locations such as Munnar and Theni. While filming the song "Aarum Athu Aalam Illai", Ramya Krishnan stood without moving much because her right leg had been fractured shortly before. During the completion, Pandiyan's market was allegedly dull, so Kalaimani changed the climax to show Sathyaraj as hero.

== Soundtrack ==
The music was composed by Ilaiyaraaja. The song is "Aarum Athu Aalam Illai" set in the Carnatic raga Vakulabharanam.

Song	Singers	Lyrics	Length
"Aarum Athu Aalam Illai"	Uma Ramanan	Muthulingam	03:30
"Aarum Athu Aalam Illai"	Ilaiyaraaja	Muthulingam	04:56
"Maanada Kodi"	Janaki	Vaali	04:32
"Ponni Nadhi"	S. P. Balasubrahmanyam	Gangai Amaran	04:11
"Summa Thodavum Maatten"	Janaki	Gangai Amaran	04:12
"Summa Thodavum Maattom"	S. P. Balasubrahmanyam, Malaysia Vasudevan	Gangai Amaran	04:34

== Release and reception ==
Muthal Vasantham was released on 22 May 1986. Jayamanmadhan of Kalki noted that, despite infusing masala into a love story, the makers did a good execution of the story. The film ran for over 25 weeks in theatres.
