= Naanayam Illatha Naanayam =

- Title card
- Directed by: Visu
- Written by: Visu
- Produced by: K. R. Kannan
- Starring: Visu; Rajyalakshmi
- Cinematography: N. Balakrishnan
- Edited by: N. R. Kittu
- Music by: Vijay Anand
- Production company: KRK Art Films
- Release date: 29 June 1984
- Country: India
- Language: Tamil

Naanayam Illatha Naanayam (transl. Coin without integrity) (Note: "Naanayam" can mean either coin or integrity.) is a 1984 Indian Tamil-language film written and directed by Visu. The film stars him and Rajyalakshmi. It was released on 29 June 1984.

== Plot ==
Veerapandithevar "Veerapandi", a lawyer providing free legal services, is suspected of having an affair with the blacksmith Kalan's sister, Maya by his family, including his wife Kannamma, two sons, and teenage daughter, but his daughter-in-law Uma trusts him implicitly. Veerapandi's daughter Indira, married to police inspector Irulappan, suffers from mental illness after a fire accident. Despite Veerapandi's suggestion to remarry, Irulappan vows to care for Indira and their toddler daughter, Sumathi. During the death anniversary feast of Veerapandi's father, Veerapandi invites Kalan and Maya to dine with them. This sparks tension between Veerapandi and Kannamma. Uma brings Veerapandi lunch and learns about his troubled past. Veerapandi reveals that his father, a drunkard, abandoned him and his mother, who later died. He was left to fend for himself but eventually became a lawyer. During this time, Veerapandi met Kalan and Maya, who were his half-siblings. He helped them by arranging a job for Kalan and marrying off Maya, but after her husband's death, Veerapandi continued to support them. He asks Uma to keep this secret, fearing it would tarnish his father's image in the eyes of his family.

Sigamani and his grandmother move into the rented portion behind Veerapandi's house, and Sigamani instantly falls for Veerapandi's younger daughter, Sarojini "Saroja". When Sigamani's grandmother suffers an injury, Saroja cares for them, and they begin to develop feelings for each other. However, Veerapandi and Kannamma plan to marry Saroja to Irulappan, due to their elder daughter Indira's mental health issues. Saroja confides in Irulappan about her love for Sigamani, and he arranges for their marriage, even buying a car for Sigamani as a wedding gift. Meanwhile, Veerapandi's elder son, Chidambaram, accepts bribes and accumulates wealth without his father's knowledge. Uma, Chidambaram's wife, protests by fasting one day a week, but Chidambaram deceives his family, claiming Uma is fasting to conceive. Veerapandi's activism against Aandavar, a powerful businessman and gangster, puts him in danger. Aandavar owns multiple businesses under benami names and exploits the poor. Veerapandi's efforts to expose Aandavar's wrongdoings enrage him, leading to attacks on Veerapandi. However, Kalan saves him. Veerapandi confronts Aandavar about his exploitative practices, challenging him to change his ways. Aandavar, with significant political influence, tries to bribe, honey-trap, and harm Veerapandi and his family. When these attempts fail, Aandavar decides to gather information about Veerapandi's family to use against him.

Aandavar, knowing Chidambaram's corrupt nature, bribes him and begins blackmailing. During an argument, Chidambaram fires at Aandavar's PA, but the bullets are fake. Believing he killed the PA, Chidambaram escapes with Aandavar's help. However, Aandavar kills his PA to use the situation to his advantage. Aandavar then hires Sigamani's car and plants the PA's corpse in the trunk without Sigamani's knowledge. He anonymously tips off Irulappan, claiming Sigamani is smuggling drugs. Irulappan stops the car, finds the body, and arrests Sigamani despite their familial connection. Veerapandi tries to bail Sigamani out, but Irulappan refuses due to safety concerns. Sigamani recounts the events leading to his arrest, and Irulappan begins investigating Aandavar. However, Aandavar's political influence allows him to escape custody. Veerapandi plans to use Aandavar's dog as evidence, knowing it remembers people it's met. The dog's reaction to Sigamani would confirm Aandavar's involvement. However, Chidambaram, fearing his arrest if Aandavar confesses, secretly informs Aandavar about Veerapandi's plan. Aandavar kills his dog to prevent the evidence. Uma witnesses Chidambaram's suspicious conversation and notices Aandavar's signature saffron bag in Chidambaram's pocket. She informs Veerapandi about the leaked plan and shows him Chidambaram's ill-gotten gains, revealing his involvement with Aandavar.

Veerapandi confronts Chidambaram about his connection with Aandavar. After initial denial, Chidambaram confesses to killing Aandavar's PA, shocking the entire family. Meanwhile, a drunken Aandavar attempts to kill Irulappan's wife, boasting about his crimes. Irulappan's daughter Sumathi secretly records the conversation. Maya witnesses Aandavar kidnapping Indira and informs Kalan, who sets out to rescue her. Aandavar also kidnaps Saroja and tries to assault her. However, Indira regains her memory after a shocking experience and is rescued by Irulappan. Sumathi hands over the recorded evidence to Veerapandi's younger son. Chidambaram also joins the rescue efforts. Finally, Veerapandi arrives with the police and apprehends Aandavar and his accomplices. However, Aandavar fatally stabs Kalan before being caught. Maya's lamentation over her brother's death and her reference to Veerapandi as her brother reveals the truth about their relationship to Kannamma. Kannamma realizes Veerapandi's innocence and apologizes for her past behavior. Chidambaram performs the final rites for Kalan, symbolizing their acceptance of him as their family member. He then surrenders to the police for his involvement in bribery.

== Cast ==
- Visu as Veerapandithevar "Veerapandi"
- Judo Rathnam as Kalan, Maya's brother
- Kishmu as K. R. Aandavar
- S. Ve. Shekher as Deivasigamani "Sigamani"
- Rajesh as Inspector Irulappan
- Sivachandran as Chidambaram
- Rajyalakshmi as Uma, Chidambaram's wife
- M. N. Rajam as Kannamma
- P. R. Varalakshmi as Maya, Kalan's sister
- Sathyakala as Indira, Irulappan's wife
- T. P. Gajendran as a villager
- Manager Cheena as a hotel manager
- Omakuchi Narasimhan as Narasimhan, hotel waiter
- Sethu Vinayagam as Aandavar's PA
- Typist Gopu as a Public prosecutor
- Manohar Jr.
- Silk Smitha (special appearance in the song "Mama Varalama")

== Production ==
The film was launched on 3 November 1982 at AVM Studios along with song recording.

== Soundtrack ==
The music was composed by Vijay Anand. This was to have been his debut film before Oorukku Upadesam became his first release.

Track listing
No.	Title	Lyrics	Singer(s)	Length
1.	"Azhage Nee Piranthathu"	Idhayachandran	S. P. Balasubrahmanyam
2.	"Mama Varalama"	Idhayachandran	S. P. Sailaja, Malaysia Vasudevan
3.	"Nottu"	Gangai Amaran	Malaysia Vasudevan, chorus
4.	"Alaimagal Valamvantha"	Idhayachandran	Vani Jairam

== Critical reception ==
Jayamanmadhan of Kalki wrote some of the stories keep flowing while reading after finishing it, you do not want to think about it again, that kind of film this is.
