= Parashuram (1989 film) =

1989 Indian Kannada-language action film

- Film poster
- Directed by: V. Somashekhar
- Screenplay by: V. Somashekhar
- Dialogues by: Chi. Udaya Shankar
- Story by: T. N. Narasimhan
- Produced by: Parvathamma Rajkumar
- Starring: Dr. Rajkumar; Puneeth Rajkumar; Mahalakshmi; Vani Viswanath
- Cinematography: H. G. Raju
- Edited by: P. Bhaktavatsalam
- Music by: Hamsalekha
- Production company: Dakshayini Combines
- Release date: 1989
- Country: India
- Language: Kannada

Parashuram is a 1989 Indian Kannada-language action film directed by V. Somashekar and produced by Parvathamma Rajkumar under Dakshayini Combines. The film stars Dr. Rajkumar, alongside Mahalakshmi, Vani Viswanath and Puneeth Rajkumar. This was V. Somashekhar's last film with Rajkumar, who incidentally started his directing career with Bangaarada Panjara. The musical score and soundtrack were composed by Hamsalekha, while cinematography and editing were handled by H. G. Raju and P. Bhaktavatsalam.

== Plot ==
Parashuram, an ex-army Major running a private security agency, learns about Rajiv "MD" Malhotra, a crime lord, and his organized syndicate network, supported by MD's partners Purohit, Kulkarni and Nayak. MD runs short of money to fund his election campaign and gets his syndicate network to double the monthly roll-call. MD gets impressed by Parashuram and asks him to work for him, but Parashuram refuses and walks away. MD hatches a plan to destroy Parashuram, where he tactfully kills Parashuram's wife Usha and his son. An enraged Parashuram, with the help of a press reporter and his little friend Appu, takes law into his own hands and soon kills MD, Purohit, Kulkarni and Nayak with a parashu (a weapon of Parashurama).

== Cast ==
- Dr. Rajkumar as Parashuram
- Vani Viswanath as Usha, Parashuram's Wife
- Mahalakshmi as Malini, film actress
- Puneeth Rajkumar as Appu
- Ashok Rao as Rajiv "MD" Malhotra
- C. R. Simha as Purohhit T.
- Dheerendra Gopal as Ullagaddi Basappa, film producer
- Prithviraj as N. Kulakarni
- Doddanna as M. K. Nayak
- T. N. Narasimhan as Judge Nanjundaiah
- Sudheer
- Thoogudeepa Srinivas as M. Shivaraj
- Jaggesh as M. Shivaraj's son
- Vijay Raghavendra in a cameo appearance in the song "Kadre Thappu Kondre Thappu"
- Srisailan
- Suneel Puranik as Sunil Kumar, Nanjundaiah's son
- Sadashiva Brahmavar as Appu's grandfather
- Mimicry Dayanand as Prabhakar
- Bank Janardhan
- Negro Johnny
- Dingri Nagaraj
- Bangalore Nagesh as film director
- Aravind

== Soundtrack ==
Parashuram

Soundtrack album by Hamsalekha
- Released: 1989
- Genre: Feature film soundtrack
- Label: Sangeetha

Hamsalekha composed the background score for the film and the soundtracks. Lyrics for the soundtracks were penned by Chi. Udaya Shankar, T. P. Kailasam and Hamsalekha. The album consists of five soundtracks. Singer Swarnalatha was introduced to Kannada film industry through this soundtrack. The song "Nagutha Nagutha Baalu" was received extremely well upon release.

Tracklist
No.	Title	Lyrics	Singer(s)	Length
1.	"Thandana Thandana"	Hamsalekha	Rajkumar, Manjula Gururaj	04:55
2.	"Nagutha Nagutha Baalu"	Chi. Udaya Shankar	Rajkumar	04:45
3.	"Eleya Mareyali"	Chi. Udaya Shankar	Manjula Gururaj	04:16
4.	"Saradaara Baa Baalina"	Hamsalekha	Rajkumar, Swarnalatha	04:37
5.	"Kadre Thappu Kondre Thappu"	T. P. Kailasam	Puneeth Rajkumar	04:42
Total length:				23:15
