= Vetri Mel Vetri =

- Theatrical release poster
- Directed by: M. Thyagarajan
- Written by: M. Thyagarajan
- Produced by: K. S. Seenivasan; K. S. Sivaraman
- Starring: Prabhu; Seetha
- Cinematography: Siva
- Edited by: G. Jayachandran
- Music by: Vijay Anand
- Production company: Sivasri Pictures
- Release date: 1 December 1989
- Country: India
- Language: Tamil

Vetri Mel Vetri (transl. Success streak) is a 1989 Indian Tamil-language masala film directed by M. Thyagarajan in his debut. The film stars Prabhu as a spoilt and aimless man who eventually becomes a boxer, and Seetha as his wife. It was released on 1 December 1989 and became an average success.

== Plot ==
A spoilt, aimless man eventually becomes a boxer.

== Cast ==
- Prabhu as Rajkumar "Kumar"
- Seetha as Janaki
- S. S. Chandran
- Nassar as Duraipandi
- Anandaraj as Nagaraj
- Manorama as Janaki's school principal
- Disco Shanti
- Dara Singh as Antony, Rajkumar's boxing trainer
- Chinni Jayanth
- Sethu Vinayagam
- Swaminathan
- Pandu
- MRK
- Usilai Mani
- Rocky as Vicky

== Soundtrack ==
The soundtrack was composed by Vijay Anand.

Track listing
No.	Title	Lyrics	Singer(s)	Length
1.	"En Nenjile"	Muthulingam	S. Janaki, Mano	4:47
2.	"Mallina Mallithan"	S. Malarmaran	S. P. Balasubrahmanyam, Sudhakar	4:05
3.	"Kannana Kanmaniye"	Muthulingam	K. J. Yesudas, K. S. Chitra	4:26
4.	"Hare Istanbul"	M. A. Ezhilan	Gangai Amaran	4:29
5.	"Indha Naal Nalla Naale"	Muthulingam	S. P. Balasubrahmanyam, Sunandha, Vidya	2:30
Total length:				20:17

== Release and reception ==
Vetri Mel Vetri was released on 1 December 1989. P. S. S. of Kalki called it another routine masala fare, which was thankfully not nauseating.
