= Nandri =

- Poster
- Directed by: Rama Narayanan
- Screenplay by: Rama Narayanan
- Story by: A. L. Abbaiah Naidu
- Produced by: A. V. M. Rajan
- Starring: Karthik; Nalini; Mahalakshmi; Arjun
- Cinematography: N. K. Viswanathan; K. S. Selvaraj
- Edited by: Goudhaman
- Music by: Shankar–Ganesh
- Production company: Rajmahal
- Distributed by: Sujatha Films
- Release date: 17 August 1984
- Running time: 134 minutes
- Country: India
- Language: Tamil

Nandri (transl. Thanks) is a 1984 Indian Tamil-language thriller film, directed and scripted by Rama Narayanan, with story written by Abbaiah Naidu. It stars Karthik, Nalini, Mahalakshmi and Arjun, with a dog named Brownie in a pivotal role. Arjun made his acting debut in Tamil with this film. It is a remake of the Kannada film Thaliya Bhagya. The film was released on 17 August 1984.

== Cast ==
- Karthik as Officer Shankar
- Nalini as Lakshmi
- Mahalakshmi as Saratha
- Arjun as Murugan
- Sangili Murugan as Sathyanathan, the village chairman
- S. S. Chandran as Punniyakodi
- A. V. M. Rajan as D. I. G.
- Brownie as Raja (Dog), Shankar's pet
- M. R. K as Dharmalingam
- Peeli Sivam as Inspector
- Master Vimal as Ramu
- Shankar–Ganesh as Mentally Challenged (guest appearance)
- Senthil as guest appearance
- Anuradha as guest appearance

== Production ==
Nandri is the Tamil debut of Arjun. When approached by Rama Narayanan, he was initially reluctant due to his then poor grasp of the language, but Rama Narayanan still cast him. According to Arjun, the character being mute benefited him.

== Soundtrack ==
Music was by Shankar–Ganesh and lyrics were written by Vaali.

Song	Singers	Length
"Naan thaan Rukumani"	S. P. Sailaja	04:05
"Vaa Vaa En Thalaivan"	P. Jayachandran Vani Jairam	04:21
"Thaai Seitha Paavam"	P. Susheela	04:41
"Madhurai Nagarinile"	Raju Jayaram Vani Jairam	04:54
