= Vijay Anand (composer) =

Indian composer (died 2024)

- Born: Jude Matthew c. 1952; Chennai, Tamil Nadu, India
- Died: 6 February 2024 (aged 71); Chennai, Tamil Nadu, India
- Occupation: Composer
- Years active: 1984–2007
- Spouse: Amali
- Children: 1

Vijay Anand (born Jude Matthew, c. 1952 – 6 February 2024) was an Indian music composer who worked in Kannada and Tamil films. Initially a composer for stage plays, he made his film debut with the Tamil film Oorukku Upadesam (1984), and became more active in Kannada films after working on its remake Indina Ramayana the same year.

== Career ==
Vijay Anand was born in Madras (now Chennai) to Roman Catholic parents. He developed an interest in music at the age of five due to the musical troupe Thomas and Party being his neighbours. After seeing his interest in music, they invited him to their troupe and made him a part of their concerts. He later started his own troupe in 1972. Anand was also a composer for Visu's stage plays. He was expected to debut in film with Visu's Naanayam Illatha Naanayam (1984); however Oorukku Upadesam, released the same year, became his film debut. Dwarakish who was impressed with his music in Oorukku Upadesam chose him to compose music for its Kannada remake Indina Ramayana (1984). Vijay Anand went to score for more Tamil films including Naan Adimai Illai (1986), Kavalan Avan Kovalan (1987), Vetri Mel Vetri (1989) and Rasathi Varum Naal (1991). Naan Adimai Illai remains his best-known Tamil film. He was, however, more prolific in Kannada cinema. He also composed the music for a 1992 album titled Asia Classics I. One of his last releases was the Kannada film Mugila Chumbana, which had a delayed release in 2013.

== Personal life ==
Vijay Anand was married to Amali, and they had a daughter. He died in Chennai on 6 February 2024, at age 71, following health issues since December 2023.

== Discography ==
| Year | Title | Language | Notes |
|---|---|---|---|
| 1984 | Oorukku Upadesam | Tamil | |
| 1984 | Naanayam Illatha Naanayam | Tamil | |
| 1984 | Vaai Sollil Veeranadi | Tamil | |
| 1984 | Indina Ramayana | Kannada | |
| 1985 | Brahma Gantu | Kannada | |
| 1985 | Nee Bareda Kadambari | Kannada | |
| 1985 | Nee Thanda Kanike | Kannada | |
| 1986 | Naan Adimai Illai | Tamil | |
| 1986 | Africadalli Sheela | Kannada | Background score |
| 1986 | Ee Jeeva Ninagagi | Kannada | |
| 1986 | Madhuve Madu Tamashe Nodu | Kannada | |
| 1986 | Agni Parikshe | Kannada | |
| 1987 | Kizhakku Africavil Sheela | Tamil | Background score |
| 1987 | Sheela | Hindi | Background score |
| 1987 | Onde Goodina Hakkigalu | Kannada | |
| 1987 | Sathva Pareekshe | Kannada | |
| 1987 | Jayasimha | Kannada | |
| 1987 | Kavalan Avan Kovalan | Tamil | |
| 1987 | Ravana Rajya | Kannada | |
| 1987 | Jeevana Jyothi | Kannada | |
| 1987 | Dance Raja Dance | Kannada | |
| 1987 | Nyayakke Shikshe | Kannada | |
| 1988 | Brahma Vishnu Maheshwara | Kannada | |
| 1988 | Ganda Mane Makkalu | Kannada | |
| 1988 | Daada | Kannada | |
| 1989 | Avatara Purusha | Kannada | |
| 1989 | Hendthighelbedi | Kannada | |
| 1989 | Idu Saadhya | Kannada | |
| 1989 | Jai Karnataka | Kannada | |
| 1989 | Krishna Nee Kunidaga | Kannada | |
| 1989 | Vetri Mel Vetri | Tamil | |
| 1989 | Inspector Vikram | Kannada | |
| 1990 | Maheshwara | Kannada | |
| 1991 | Rasathi Varum Naal | Tamil | |
| 1992 | Rajadhi Raja | Kannada | |
| 1993 | Captain | Kannada | |
| 1993 | Hosa Love Story | Kannada | |
| 1993 | Ananda Jyothi | Kannada | |
| 1994 | Adhipathi | Kannada | |
| 1994 | Alexander | Kannada | |
| 1994 | Kaveri Theeradalli | Kannada | |
| 1994 | Kunthi Puthra | Kannada | |
| 1995 | Killer Diary | Kannada | |
| 2000 | Uttara Dhruvadin Dakshina Dhruvaku | Kannada | |
| 2001 | Shukradeshe | Kannada | |
| 2007 | Guna | Kannada | |
| 2013 | Mugila Chumbana | Kannada | Delayed release |
