= Tata Birla =

- Title card
- Directed by: C. Ranganathan
- Written by: C. Ranganathan
- Produced by: MSV Murali
- Starring: R. Parthiban; Goundamani; Rachna Banerjee
- Cinematography: Birlabhoss
- Edited by: Mani Bharathy
- Music by: Vidyasagar
- Production company: Shree Vijayalakshmi Movieland
- Release date: 4 October 1996
- Running time: 120 minutes
- Country: India
- Language: Tamil

Tata Birla (/ˈtɑːtɑː bɪrlɑː/) (Note: Also titled We Are Not Tata Birla.) is a 1996 Indian Tamil-language comedy film directed by C. Ranganathan. The film stars R. Parthiban, Goundamani and Rachna Banerjee, credited as Rakshana. It was released on 4 October 1996. The film was remade in Telugu as Tata Birla Madhyalo Laila (2006).

== Plot ==
Priya lost her parents when she was a child and the will decree that her huge wealth would go to an orphanage if something bad happened to her by someone in line to inherit the property after her, before her 21st birthday. Her father's younger brother Ramanathan has cleverly positioned himself as an affectionate uncle to his niece Priya. Priya grows up in Ooty with her wealthy maternal grandparents and uncle.

Here enter two petty thieves: Raja and Ranjith, of Coimbatore who makes small robberies to live. One day they rob a bank to end their life of misery and theft. Ramanathan is also inside the bank and is impressed by their bravery. But their plan fails and they are arrested. Ramanathan bails them out and offers them the assignment to kill Priya as she is about to be 21. The duo rejects this offer and attempts another burglary at night at a financier's house, only to find the financier dead. Ramanathan takes their photo with the dead body and knife and blackmails them into working with him.

The man goes to Ooty and is appointed as caretaker and manager of the house of Priya. They make multiple unsuccessful attempts to kill Priya. On one such attempt, Priya saves Raja with her saree on a cliff and reveals that she is in love with him. Raja naturally falls in love with Priya and learns from watchman that Ramanathan killed Priya's parents. So he starts his game against his own boss. Things go on successfully for Raja until Priya's grandfather discovers that Raja and Ranjith were small-time thieves and murder convicts. But the men make the police shoot the grandfather in the neck, rendering him speechless. They also decide to eliminate Ramanathan. But Ramanathan poisons Priya's birthday cake and reveals to the mute grandfather that he is responsible for this and Raja is innocent.

On the birthday, Priya's grandfather eat the cake himself to save Priya, but Raja is framed by Ramanathan and he is sent out. Raja returns immediately and kidnaps Priya and a fight ensues after a chase. Raja is shot and Ramanathan reveals his plans to Priya. And when he is about to kill her the injured Raja returns and saves Priya. Ramanathan is given an ultimatum that if he returns to Ooty city, he will be killed and is let to the forest. Raja and Priya then live together with Ranjith as their new house manager.

== Cast ==
- R. Parthiban as Raja
- Goundamani as Ranjith
- Rachna Banerjee as Priya
- Manivannan as Ramanathan
- Vennira Aadai Moorthy
- Balu Anand as Deluxe Pandian
- Sachu
- Nellai Siva as Police head constable
- Chelladurai as Valparai Varadhan

== Soundtrack ==
The music was composed by Vidyasagar, with lyrics written by Vaali.

| Song | Singer(s) | Duration |
|---|---|---|
| "Ari Babre Tamilachiya" | Vidyasagar | 4:44 |
| "London Paris Racedu" | S. P. Balasubrahmanyam, Vidyasagar | 4:32 |
| "Priya Unn Tholai" | S. P. Balasubrahmanyam, Sujatha | 4:24 |
| "Bava Bava Ushtava" | Mano, Swarnalatha, Vidyasagar | 3:52 |
| "Vedhalam Murungai" | Mano, Swarnalatha | 3:58 |

== Reception ==
R. P. R. of Kalki praised the humour of Goundamani and Manivannan but panned the film's editing and stunts.

== See also ==
- Tata-Birla word pair
