= Coimbatore Mappille =

1996 film by C. Ranganathan

- Poster
- Directed by: C. Ranganathan
- Written by: C. Ranganathan
- Produced by: M. S. V. Murali
- Starring: Vijay; Sanghavi
- Cinematography: R. Raja Ratnam
- Edited by: C. Cedrick
- Music by: Vidyasagar
- Production company: Shree Vijayalakshmi Movieland
- Release date: 15 January 1996
- Running time: 134 minutes
- Country: India
- Language: Tamil

Coimbatore Mappillai (transl. The Groom from Coimbatore) is a 1996 Indian Tamil-language romantic comedy film written and directed by C. Ranganathan. It stars Vijay and Sanghavi in the lead roles. The film's score and music was composed by Vidyasagar. It was released on 15 January 1996 during Pongal. The film ended as a hit at the Tamil Nadu box office as it released on Pongal festival, marking Vijay's favourable success streak with his other film releases on Pongal day.

== Plot ==
Balu comes to Chennai from Coimbatore and stays with his friend Gopal, who claims he has a job. Actually, he is also unemployed. Both of them are tenants of a girl named Sumithra. First, Balu and Sumithra get into fights, but then their arguments and fights turn into love. Meanwhile, Sumithra's cousin Mahesh is also in love with her. One day, Balu witnesses a thief stealing a necklace, and when he tries to catch him, the thief inserts the necklace in Balu's pocket, and Balu is blamed for stealing it. Sumithra starts hating Balu. Taking advantage of this situation, Mahesh creates a rift between them by hiring goons to attack them, and he blames Balu for that too. Balu explains his sad story to her grandmother Paattiamma that he lost his mother when he was young and could not endure the torture of his stepmother, so he escaped from home. Paatiamma believes him, but Mahesh takes revenge by setting up wires and making her paralysed. In the hospital, Sumithra overhears Mahesh and his father wanting to kill her to steal their colony. Balu pays the medical bills and attempts to commit suicide, but Sumithra saves him. Mahesh, who tried to kill him, is killed in a stampede. The film ends with Balu and Sumithra living happily.

== Cast ==
- Vijay as Balu
  - Master Udayaraj as young Balu
- Sanghavi as Sumithra
- Goundamani as Gopal
- Senthil as White
- Nirmalamma as Paattimaa, Sumithra and Mahesh's grandmother
- Karan as Shroov Mahesh, Sumithra's cousin
- Vinu Chakravarthy as Mahesh's father
- Pandu as Traffic Police Ponraj
- Omakuchi Narasimhan
- Master Mahendran as Sumithra's neighbour
- A. K. Senthil
- Chelladurai as Naina
- LIC Narasimhan as Doctor
- Bonda Mani as Tenant
- Idichapuli Selvaraj as Monkey Charmer
- Sethu Vinayagam as J. P.
- Chaplin Balu as Cycle Shop Owner
- J. Lalitha as Balu's stepmother
- Karuppu Subbiah as Tenant
- Silk Smitha as special appearance in the song "Annamalai Deepam"
- Madhusudhan Rao as JP's henchman (uncredited)
- P. T. Selvakumar as Doctor (uncredited)

== Soundtrack ==
The soundtrack was composed by Vidyasagar. Bollywood playback singer Sadhana Sargam recorded her first Tamil song for this film. The audio rights were acquired by DD Music, Lucky Audio and Pyramid Audio.

Title	Singer(s)	Lyrics	Length
"Annamalai Deepam"	Mano, Swarnalatha	Vaali	4:31
"Coimbatore Mappillaikku"	Udit Narayan, Sadhana Sargam, Vijay	Vaali	4:31
"Jeevan En Jeevan"	S. P. Balasubrahmanyam	P. R. C. Balu	4:42
"Oru Theithi Paarthal"	Hariharan, Sadhana Sargam	Vaali	4:32
"Bombai Party"	Vijay, Shahul Hameed	Vaali	4:24

== Reception ==
D. S. Ramanujam of The Hindu wrote "Director C. Ranganathan, with some minor hiccups here and there the Mahabalipuram sequence is one among them sets a brisk pace for the proceedings, his screenplay coming good in portions where the young villain makes his moves to win the confidence of the heroine and her grandmother".

== In popular culture ==
The film's villain background music suddenly went viral in 2018 due to the word "Shroovv". In one of the scenes where Vijay's character talks to his grandmother about Karan's character, and the latter's appearance is seen along with the background music "Shroovv", thus earned him the title "Shroov star".
