= Chaitrada Premanjali =

1992 film by S. Narayan

- VCD cover
- Directed by: S. Narayan
- Written by: S. Narayan
- Produced by: M. Shashikala
- Starring: Raghuveer; Shwetha; Lokesh; Abhijeeth
- Cinematography: P. K. H. Das
- Edited by: Suresh Urs
- Music by: Hamsalekha
- Production company: M. C. Productions
- Release date: 13 January 1992
- Running time: 154 minutes
- Country: India
- Language: Kannada

Chaitrada Premanjali is a 1992 Indian Kannada-language romance drama film directed and written by S. Narayan making his debut in direction. The film stars newcomers Raghuveer and Shwetha along with Lokesh and Abhijeeth in other pivotal roles. This movie was also the debut movie of Shobaraj. The film met with positive reviews upon release from critics and audience eventually becoming the musical hit of the year.

The film featured original score and soundtrack composed and written by Hamsalekha. The soundtrack proved to be one of the biggest hit albums of the year.

== Plot ==
Fresh faces romance with a tragic end. Karate champion Prem (Raghuveer) goes to the family country retreat to practice for a tournament and falls for village girl Anju (Shweta). Her father (Lokesh), however, prevents the marriage and tries to force her to marry a womanizer with an obliging father. Prem wins his trophy and rescues Anju, but the couple is killed by the bad guys.

== Cast ==
- Raghuveer as Prem
- Shwetha as Anju
- Abhijeeth as Mahesh, an evil man
- Lokesh as Seenappa, Anju's father
- Srinivasa Murthy as Manmatha Rao, Prem's father
- Rajanand as Manjayya, servant of Prem's estate
- Jyothi Gurucharan as step-mother
- Ashalatha as Prem's dead mother
- Sathyajith as karate trainer
- S. Narayan as Shankar, Prem's close friend
- Swasthik Shankar as Jagapathi Rao, Mahesh's father
- Shobaraj as Veerabhadra
- Thriller Manju as Robert, karate champion
- Vikram
- K. D. Venkatesh
- Guru Murthy

== Production ==
Shobaraj was cast in the film after the actor who supposed to play the role did not show up.

== Soundtrack ==
The music was composed and written by Hamsalekha for Lahari Music audio company.

Track listing
No.	Title	Singer(s)	Length
1.	"O Kogile"	S. P. Balasubrahmanyam
2.	"O Malenadina"	S. P. Balasubrahmanyam, K. S. Chithra
3.	"Dance Dance"	S. P. Balasubrahmanyam
4.	"Nannavare Nanage"	S. P. Balasubrahmanyam, Manjula Gururaj
5.	"Daari Bidu"	Manjula Gururaj
6.	"Chaitrada Premanjaliya"	S. P. Balasubrahmanyam, Chandrika Gururaj
7.	"Kaveri Theeradalli Mungarige"	Latha Hamsalekha

== Release ==
The film was ready for release but no theaters were willing to screen the film citing that Raghuveer was not good looking. Ultimately, with the intervention of producer Ramu, theatre owners agreed to screen the film until Khuda Gawah (1992) starring Amitabh Bachchan released. However, soon after the release of this film, theaters had house full shows and Khuda Gawah had to delay its release in Karnataka by one month.
