= Unakkaga Mattum =

- Directed by: Chinni Jayanth
- Written by: Chinni Jayanth
- Produced by: Jayasree Narayanan
- Starring: Chinni Jayanth; Adhitya; Poonam; Ramji
- Cinematography: K. S. Uthaya Sankar
- Edited by: P. A. Balamurugan
- Music by: Bobby Shankar (songs); Devendran (score)
- Production company: Kamalam Movies
- Release date: 22 July 2000
- Running time: 120 minutes
- Country: India
- Language: Tamil

Unakkaga Mattum (transl. For you only) is a 2000 Indian Tamil language film directed by Chinni Jayanth, making his directorial debut. The film stars himself, newcomer Adhithya, newcomer Poonam and Ramji. The film, produced by Jayasree Narayanan, had music composed by newcomer Bobby Shankar, Shankar's son (of the duo Shankar–Ganesh) and was released on 22 July 2000.

== Plot ==
Subramani (Adhitya), a timid and rich Brahmin boy, falls in love with Lakshmi (Poonam), a poor girl. Raja (Chinni Jayanth), a rich drunkard, joins the college. Raja falls for Lakshmi but later withdraws, and he is content to remain her good friend. Subramani begins to suspect the relationship between Raja and Lakshmi. Subramani becomes a drunkard although Raja stops drinking alcohol.

== Cast ==
- Chinni Jayanth as Raja
- Adhitya as Subramani
- Poonam as Lakshmi
- Ramji as Guru
- Vinu Chakravarthy
- Pandu as a professor
- Laxmi Rathan as Subramani's father
- Sathyapriya as Lakshmi's mother
- Kavitha
- Shanthi Williams as Mangalam, Subramani's mother
- Singamuthu
- Omakuchi Narasimhan
- Sukran
- Badava Gopi
- Bosskey as Coconut seller

== Production ==
The film's lead actor, Adithya, made his acting debut in the film. Originally from Punjab, Adithya is the nephew of the choreographer, Chopra of Hindi films, and the son of the winner of the Miss India 1972 pageant.

== Soundtrack ==
The soundtrack was composed by Bobby Shankar, with lyrics written by Pulamaipithan and Kavi Varma.

Song	Singer(s)	Duration
"Ammaadi Nee Enna"	Unni Menon	4:48
"Kaadhal Seiya"	Unni Menon, Srinivas	4:37
"Gopala Site Adichcha"	Dinesh, Sujatha Mohan	4:17
"Ninaichcha Mudippen"	Dinesh	4:12
"Penn Pookkalodu"	Srinivas, Dinesh	4:25
"Vizhiyodu"	Srinivas, Sujatha Mohan	4:25

== Reception ==
Malini Mannath of Chennai Online wrote, "Insipid direction, weakly etched characters and lacklustre narration characterises the film".

== Awards ==
At the 2000 Film Fans Association, Chinni Jayanth won the Commendation award.
