= Chinni Jayanth =

Indian actor (born 1960)

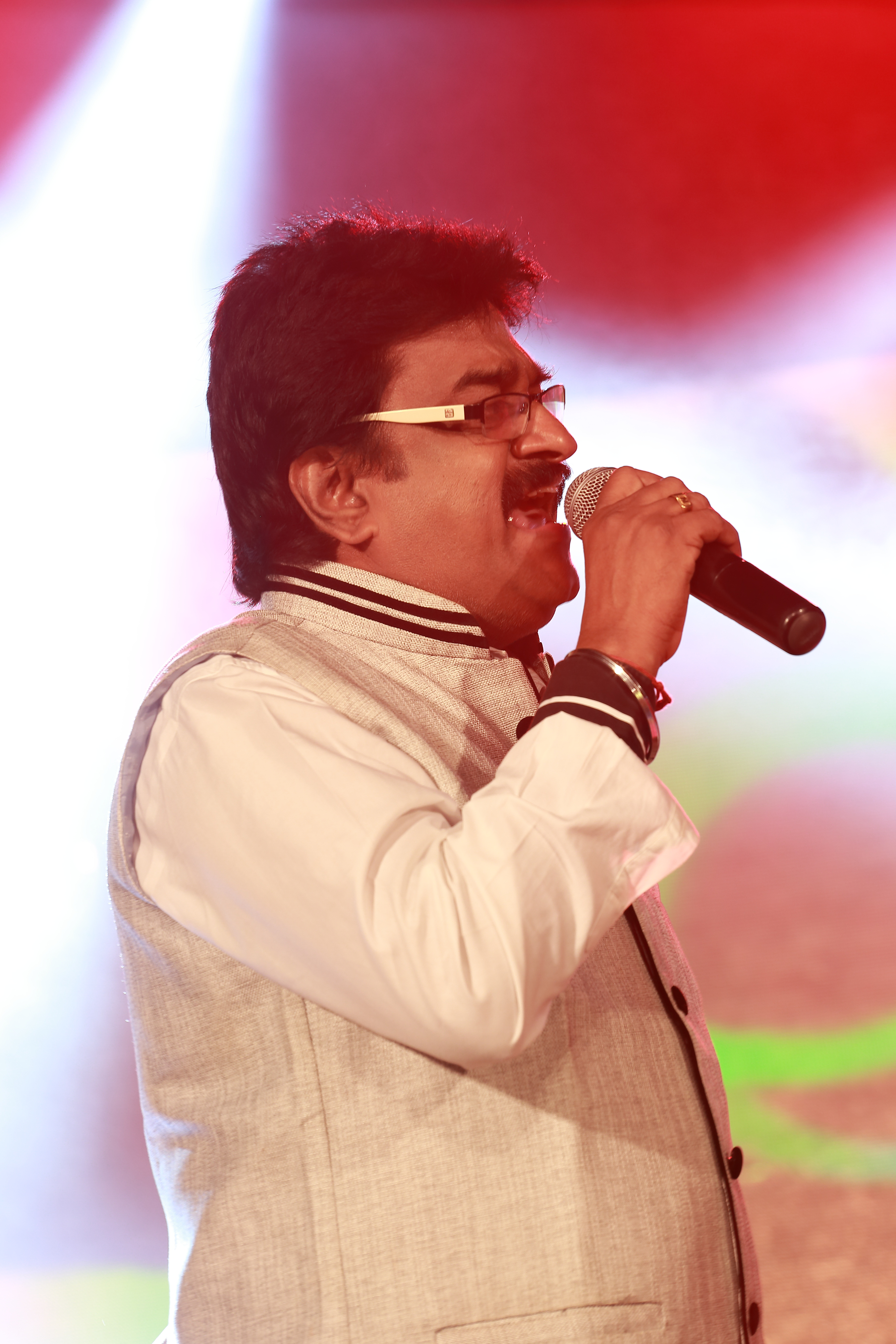
- Chinni Jayanth in a show
- Born: 26 July 1960 (age 66); Chennai, Tamil Nadu, India
- Occupations: Actor; comedian
- Years active: 1984-present
- Spouse: Jayashree
- Children: 2

Chinni Jayanth is an Indian actor,film director, producer, comedian, and a very popular mimicry artist . He has appeared in many main, character, and supporting roles in Tamil films. He is also a popular television personality, having hosted hit shows like Sagalai Vs Ragalai, Kalakka Povathu Yaar on Vijay TV and Asathapovathu Yaaru on Sun TV in Chennai. He has pioneered the art of mimicry and has been instrumental in spreading this art form across the globe. He has inspired more than 2 generations of aspiring artists to take up this art form. Through his TV shows, he has gifted many leading mimicry stars to the TV and Film world. He is also a recipient of the Kalaimamani award given by the Government of Tamil Nadu for excellence in the field of cinema. He received this award from the Chief Minister of Tamil Nadu at a glittering function at Valluvar Kottam.

As an acknowledgement of his efforts in the field of cinema, mimicry, stage performances and social service activities, Chinni Jayanth was presented with a doctorate by The Open International University of Alternate Medicine on 29 December 2013. He has also been an active member of organisations like Round Table India through which he has been a part of many fundraising initiatives to give back to society. He has also involved himself in conducting many workshops on acting through which he shares his knowledge gained with 42 years of experience in the industry to help youngsters of today reach their goal in life

== Early life and family ==
Chinni Jayanth is an alumnus of Ramakrishna Mission Students Home, Chennai. He went on to study at New College, Royapettah. He then completed his acting course (Diploma in Film Technology, DFTech) from the Film and Television Institute of Tamil Nadu in Taramani. He has a son, Srutanjay Narayanan, who has now cleared the UPSC exams to become an IAS officer.

== Cinema career ==
Jayanth began his acting career in 1984, playing the supporting role to the eccentric villain in director Mahendran's film Kai Kodukkum Kai.

He fell into a niche with his unique style of comedy which included the creation of some unique words like "gilfans", "silfans", etc.

Jayanth's performance in Chinna Pulla (1994) along with Revathi was well received. In the movie, Jayanth portrayed a mentally challenged person. This movie was also the first production of his company Ashtalakshmi Creators.

His directorial debut was in the film Unakkaga Mattum. The second film he directed was Kaanal Neer, which introduced J.K. Rithesh and Manisha Chatterjee in lead roles.

His last direction was the movie Neeye Yen Kaadhali (2010), and played a vital role in the screen play. The film was graded by experts Suresh Menon and Brian Jennings at HD Studios, Sushma Multimedia, Chennai.

== Filmography ==
=== Actor ===
==== Tamil films ====
Year	Title	Role	Notes
1984	Kai Kodukkum Kai		
1984	24 Mani Neram	Seenu	
1984	January 1		
1985	Santhosha Kanavukal		
1985	Pillai Nila	Sekar	
1985	Idaya Kovil	Suresh's friend	
1986	Uyire Unakkaga	Balu's friend	
1986	Muthal Vasantham		
1986	Rasigan Oru Rasigai		
1986	Puthir	Vijay's cousin	
1986	Paaru Paaru Pattanam Paaru		
1986	Vidinja Kalyanam		
1986	Aayiram Pookkal Malarattum		
1986	Kaalamellam Un Madiyil		
1986	Lakshmi Vandhachu	Gilbert	
1987	Velicham		
1987	Valayal Satham		
1987	Chinna Poove Mella Pesu	Arokiyam	
1987	Anand		
1988	Annanagar Mudhal Theru		
1988	Raja Chinna Roja	Raja's friend	
1988	Nallavan	Raja's friend	
1989	Dilli Babu		
1989	Manidhan Marivittan		
1989	Idhaya Deepam		
1989	Vetri Vizha	Chinni	
1989	Dharmam Vellum	Subbaraj	
1989	Vetri Mel Vetri		
1990	Idhaya Thamarai	Vijay's friend	
1990	Athisaya Piravi	Periyasaamy	
1990	Ayul Kaithi	Chandrasekhar's friend	
1990	Adhisaya Manithan	Majunu	
1990	Kizhakku Vaasal	Maakaan	
1990	Nangal Puthiyavargal	Chandramohan	
1990	Keladi Kannmanii	Adaikkalam's friend	
1990	My Dear Marthandan		
1990	Mallu Vetti Minor		
1990	Vaigasi Poranthachu	Headmaster	
1990	Nadigan	Chinni	
1991	Eeramana Rojave	Maari	
1991	Pudhiya Raagam	Vivek	
1991	Ennarukil Nee Irunthal		
1991	Maanagara Kaaval	Seenu	
1991	Thambikku Oru Pattu		
1991	Anbu Sangili	Antony	
1991	Idhayam	Chinni	
1991	Pondatti Sonna Kettukanum		
1992	Endrum Anbudan	Ashok	
1992	Mappillai Vanthachu		
1992	Meera	Comic Inspector's assistant	
1993	Enga Thambi	Double Seven	
1993	Pudhiya Mugam	Michael	
1993	Gokulam	Chellappa's friend	
1993	Kalaignan	Indrajith's assistant	
1993	Kathirukka Neramillai	Raju's friend	
1994	Paasamalargal		
1994	Seevalaperi Pandi		
1994	Chinna Pulla	Vadivelu	
1995	Paattu Padava	Romeo	
1995	Manathile Oru Paattu	Chinni	
1995	Chinna Vathiyar	Chinni	
1995	Aanazhagan	Raghava	
1996	Love Birds	Arun's friend	
1996	Maanbumigu Maanavan	Kumar	
1996	Krishna	Daves	
1996	Kadhal Desam	Shiva	
1997	Pongalo Pongal	Ponrasu	
1997	Ratchagan	Police constable	
1998	Vettu Onnu Thundu Rendu		
1998	Harichandra	Sundaram	
1998	Thaayin Manikodi		Uncredited role
1998	Kannedhirey Thondrinal	Boopalan	
1998	Unnudan	Madhesh	
1999	En Swasa Kaatre		
1999	Ullathai Killathe		
1999	Kadhalar Dhinam	Mandi	
1999	Kanave Kalayadhe	Pavadarayan	
1999	Kannodu Kanbathellam	Akash's friend	
1999	Pooparika Varugirom	Dhandapani	
1999	Ooty	Vivek	
2000	Sandhitha Velai	Jeeva	
2000	Unnai Kodu Ennai Tharuven	James	
2000	Ennamma Kannu		
2000	Unakkaga Mattum	Raja	
2001	Dumm Dumm Dumm		
2001	Star	Software Sagalmass	
2001	Vedham		
2002	Charlie Chaplin	Thirupathiraj	
2002	Samurai	Varadarajan	
2003	Iyarkai	"Hawala" Arumugam	
2005	Dancer		
2005	Sorry Enaku Kalyanamayidichu	Raghu	
2007	Vanjagan	Police constable	
2007	Sivaji		Cameo appearance
2007	Kaanal Neer	Pari	
2008	Kuselan	Pasimani	
2008	Dhanam		
2009	Enga Raasi Nalla Raasi	Bala's father	
2010	Neeye En Kadhali		Also director
2010	Kattradhu Kalavu		
2011	Oruvar Meethu Iruvar Sainthu		
2016	Thodari	Jack	
2016	Kaththi Sandai	Psychology professor	
2017	Muthuramalingam	Doctor	
2017	Rubaai	Kunkumarajan	
2019	Petta		Cameo appearance
2019	Oviyavai Vitta Yaru		
2019	Aghavan		
2019	Kalavu	Watchman	
2022	Trigger	Perumal	
2022	Super Senior Heroes	Ashok	
2023	Yaadhum Oore Yaavarum Kelir		
2023	Veeran	Kalimuthu	
2024	Singapore Saloon	Barber	
2024	Boat	Narayanan	
2024	Nirangal Moondru	Sakkarai	
2024	Thiru.Manickam	Samuel	
2025	Thug Life	Sadanand's right hand	
2026	Vowels	Gopal	Anthology film; segment: "Eros"
2026	Idhayam Murali	Chinni	
2026	Sardar 2	Yogi's Master	
2026	Nooru Kodi Vaanavil		

==== Other language films ====
Year	Title	Role	Language	Notes
1988	December 31	Raja Veer's friend	Kannada	Uncredited role
1991	Chaitanya	Smuggler	Telugu	
1991	Nirnayam		Telugu	
1993	Rakshana		Telugu	
1995	Muddayi Muddugumma		Telugu	
2008	Kathanayakudu	Tribal	Telugu	Scenes reused from Kuselan
2026	Aakasamlo Oka Tara	Professor Prakash	Telugu	

=== Director ===
- Unakkaga Mattum (2000)
- Kaanal Neer (2007)
- Neeye En Kadhali (2011)

=== Dubbing artist ===
Aandavan (2000) - Rajinikanth

=== Web series ===
Year	Title	Role	Network
2022	Paper Rocket	Devarajan	ZEE5
2026	Local Times	Aasiriyar Chelladurai	Amazon Prime Video
