= Omakuchi Narasimhan =

Indian actor

- Born: 1936; Kumbakonam, Madras Province, British India (now Tamil Nadu, India)
- Died: 12 March 2009 (aged 73); Chennai, Tamil Nadu, India
- Citizenship: Indian
- Occupation: Actor
- Years active: 1953-2006

Narasimhan (c. 1936 - 12 March 2009), popularly known as Omakuchi, was an Indian stage and film actor. He acted in over 1,500 films in 14 Indian languages, predominantly in Tamil. He was credited as Juttu Narasimham in Telugu cinema.

== Early life and career ==
Narasimhan was born in 1936 in Kumbakonam, a city in present-day Tamil Nadu. He made his debut in the 1953 movie Avvaiyar. On completion of his graduation, Narasimhan worked for the Life Insurance Corporation of India (LIC) for some time before re-entering the Tamil movie industry with Gowri Kalyanam (1966).

However, following his debut, Narasimhan did not act in any immediate film in order to concentrate on studies. When he was acting in Thilairajan’s play, Naradarum Nangu Thirudargalum, he got the nickname "Omakuchi" from the character he played in the drama. After one of his performances on stage, actor Suruli Rajan brought him back to films. More opportunities came his way with actor-director Visu offering him roles one after another in his movies.

He had acted in over 1500 films in 14 languages including a Hollywood film Indian Summer. Omakuchi Narasimhan was one of the stars who just made people laugh with his appearances. Despite his hilarious performances, he didn’t make it big as a leading comedian. He starred in comedy films alongside Goundamani, Senthil, Vadivelu and Vivek. His most famous films were very successful in the 80s and 90s.

Omakuchi Narasimhan last acted in Sundar C starrer Thalainagaram (2006), and he appeared as an old gang leader for a comedy scene along with Vadivelu. But no one would have thought that it would be Omakuchi Narasimhan's last film as he passed away in 2009 due to throat cancer. However, he is still living in fans hearts through his comedy scenes.

== Death ==
Narasimhan died on 12 March 2009 at the age of 73.

== Partial filmography ==
=== Tamil films ===
Year	Film	Role	Notes
1953	Avvaiyar		Uncredited
1966	Gowri Kalyanam		
1979	Manthoppu Kiliye	Homeopathy Doctor	
1981	Meendum Kokila		
1982	Pokkiri Raja		
1983	Anal Kaatru		
1983	Dowry Kalyanam	Gundurao	
1984	Thambikku Entha Ooru		
1984	Naan Mahaan Alla	Group Dancer	
1984	Oorukku Upadesam	Rich client at a Brothel	
1984	Rajathanthiram	A person in the temple	
1984	Naanayam Illatha Naanayam	Narasimhan	
1985	Aval Sumangalithan	A marriage broker	
1985	Chidambara Rahasiyam	A van driver	
1985	Ketti Melam	Dr. Gundappa	
1986	Samsaram Adhu Minsaram	Matchmaker	
1986	Sonnathu Neethaanaa		
1986	Thazhuvatha Kaigal		
1987	Kizhakku Africavil Sheela	Mathaguru	
1987	Thirumathi Oru Vegumathi	Corrupt government employee	
1987	Kavalan Avan Kovalan	Aminjikarai Ammavasai	
1987	Sattam Oru Vilaiyattu		
1988	Makkal Aanaiyittal		
1988	Oorai Therinjukiten	Lunatic person	
1990	Pudhu Vasantham		
1990	Salem Vishnu		
1991	Thalattu Ketkuthamma		
1991	Manasara Vazhthungalen		
1992	Rendu Pondatti Kaavalkaaran		
1992	Suriyan		
1992	Abhirami		
1993	Gentleman	Priest	
1993	Sabash Babu	Cook	
1994	Thendral Varum Theru		
1994	Periya Marudhu		
1994	Murai Mappillai		
1996	Coimbatore Mappillai	Man looking for rental apartment	
1996	Meendum Savithri		
1996	Indian	Lorry Driver	
1997	Aahaa Enna Porutham		
1998	Kadhala Kadhala		
1998	Kumbakonam Gopalu	Previous Tenant	
1999	Mudhalvan		
1999	Pudhu Kudithanam		
2000	Nee Enthan Vaanam		
2000	Unakkaga Mattum		
2000	Budget Padmanabhan	Vadakkan Veeragatha Mammatti	
2000	Palayathu Amman	Businessman seeking services of gemologist	
2002	Gemini	Bombay Dawood	
2006	Kumaran	Hotel Guest	Partial reshot version
2006	Thalainagaram		Uncredited

=== Telugu films ===
Year	Film	Role
1981	Guru Sishyulu	
1985	Maa Pallelo Gopaludu	
1986	Mannemlo Monagadu	
1986	Pasuputhadu	
1986	Kashmora	
1986	Ardharatri Swatantram	
1986	Muddula Krishnayya	
1987	Chinnari Devatha	
1987	Krishna Leela	
1987	Punya Dampathulu	
1987	Chakravarthy	
1987	Akshintalu	
1987	Donga Kapuram	
1988	Nyayaniki Siksha	
1988	Jeevana Jyothi	
1988	Raktha Tilakam	
1988	Station Master	
1988	Yamudiki Mogudu	
1988	Murali Krishnudu	
1988	Dora Gari Intlo Dongodu	
1989	Muddula Mavayya	Butler Gajakarna
1989	Sakshi	
1989	Bala Gopaludu	Dead body
1990	Police Bharya	
1990	Idem Pellam Baboi	
1990	Justice Rudramadevi	
1991	Ganga	
1992	Dabbu Bhale Jabbu	
1992	Balarama Krishnulu	
1993	Aarambham	
1994	Maa Voori Maaraju	
1994	Brahmachari Mogudu	
1994	Gharana Alludu	
1994	M. Dharmaraju M. A.	
1994	Ammayi Kapuram	
1995	Maatho Pettukoku	
1996	Neti Savithri	Pullaiah
1996	Pavitra Bandham	
1997	Mama Bagunnava	
1999	Devi	

=== Other language films ===
Year	Film	Role	Language	Notes
2001	Nayak	Viru Bhatia	Hindi	Remake of Mudhalvan

=== Television ===
Year	Title	Role	Channel	Language	Notes
1995	Lady Detective	Doctor	ETV	Telugu	Episode 4
