= Anuradha Krishnamoorthy =

Indian cheesemaker

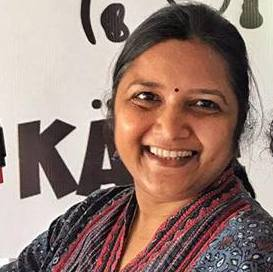
- Occupations: cheese maker and strategy consultant
- Known for: Nari Shakti Puraskar

Anuradha Krishnamoorthy is an Indian social entrepreneur and cheesemaker. She won the 2017 Nari Shakti Puraskar with her colleague Namrata Sundaresan.

== Career ==
Anuradha Krishnamoorthy set up an organisation working with disabled people, supporting them in finding work. In 2016, Krishnamoorthy then founded Käse Cheese in Chennai with chef Namrata Sundaresan. They had known each other for about ten years and her new business partner's day job was in a strategy consultancy. Their first variety was a type of Quark. They make other natural cheeses following traditional methods whilst adding local ingredients, for example using Milagai Podi to make a cheddar cheese called "Ode to Chennai". Krishnamoorthy's background in social entrepreneurship led her to employ and train disabled women. As of 2020, Käse was producing over 30 cheeses.

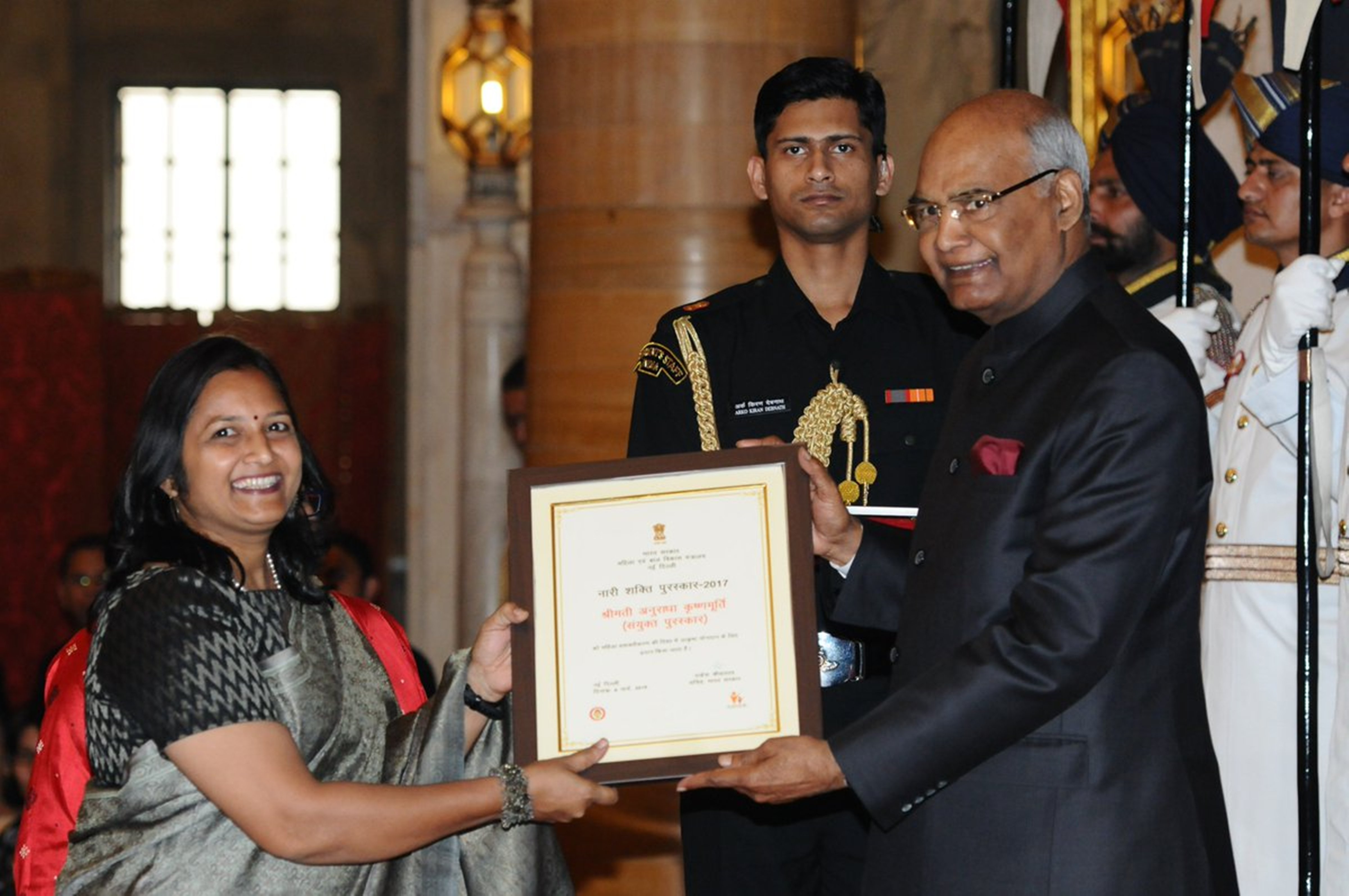
Anuradha Krishnamoorthy gaining the award

Krishnamoorthy and Sundaresan both received the 2017 Nari Shakti Puraskar for their entrepreneurship. The awards were made to on International Women's Day in 2018 on behalf of the Ministry of Women and Child Development by the President of India. The award is the highest award for women in India.
