= Sirivantha =

- Promotional poster
- Directed by: S. Narayan
- Written by: S. Narayan; Madan
- Screenplay by: S. Narayan
- Story by: Madan; Chandra Siddharth
- Based on: Aa Naluguru (2004)
- Produced by: Rockline Venkatesh
- Starring: Vishnuvardhan; Shruthi
- Cinematography: P. K. H. Das
- Edited by: P. R. Sounder Raj
- Music by: S A Rajkumar
- Production company: Rockline Productions
- Distributed by: Rockline Studios
- Release date: 28 September 2006
- Running time: 160 min
- Language: Kannada

Sirivantha is a 2006 Indian Kannada-language film starring Vishnuvardhan. This film was directed by S. Narayan. It was the sixth and last film of the Vishnu-Narayan combination. Sirivantha followed the other five Vishnu-Narayan films Veerappa Nayaka, Surya Vamsha, Simhadriya Simha, Jamindaru and Varsha. The movie is a remake of the 2004 Telugu movie Aa Naluguru.

== Plot ==
Sirivantha revolves around the concept of ideologies and self-sufficiency. Peace-loving Narayan Murthy (Vishnu) works as an editor for the Mitravani newspaper and lives his life helping others. He spends half of his earnings on his family and the other half on charitable deeds. His family consisting of his wife, two sons and a daughter opposed the principles followed by their father. There is an urgent need in the family for money because the eldest son needs it to pay a bribe to get a Sub Inspector's job and the youngest son needs to get it for his education. In order to do so, Narayan decides to start a business. He is forced to break all his principles and borrow money from a financier friend, played by Doddanna. Unable to bear the defeat of his ideology, he commits suicide the very day he gives money to his children. After hearing the news about their father's death, the children run away with the money and hide whilst the community that he helped and loved come in huge numbers to perform his last rites. The rest of the story follows the journey of how the financier gets his money back and how the children come to understand their father's ideology.

== Cast ==
- Vishnuvardhan as Narayan Murthy
- Shruthi as Lakshmi
- Doddanna as Doddaiah
- Srinath as Subbu
- Avinash as Rahim
- K. S. Ashwath as Shankarananda Swamiji (cameo appearance)
- Bhuvan Chandra
- Ravi Chethan
- Hemalatha
- Hemashree
- Shivaram as Seenayya
- R. G. Vijayasarathy
- Tulasi as Subbu's wife

== Soundtrack ==
All songs were composed by S. A. Rajkumar, with lyrics penned by S. Narayan.

S. No.	Song	Artist
1	"Megha Megha"	Hariharan, K. S. Chitra
2	"Yaaro Yaaro Ee Naalvaru"	S. P. Balasubrahmanyam
3	"Happy Day"	Tippu
4	" Koosu Mari"	S. P. Balasubramanyam, K. S. Chitra
5	"Edege Sidilu"	S. P. Balasubrahmanyam

== Reception ==
The film received positive reviews from critics especially Vishnuvardhan's performance received positive comments from several reviewers. Indiaglitz wrote "'Sirivantha' is spectacular because of its contents and portrayal of all the characters in the film is convincing. Dr.Vishnu, Shruthi and Doddanna share the top honors for their heart touching performance". Rediff wrote "Definitely a landmark film, not only for director S Narayan and Vishnuvardhan, but for all associated with it". Sify wrote "Producer Rockline Venkatesh, director S.Narayan and Dr.Vishnuvardhana comes together to give a landmark film that is a torch bearer to the society. Sirivantha lives up to the expectations and is a meaningful and moral boosting film". Former Prime Minister H. D. Deve Gowda thought the film had a "strong message".
