= Kuriakose Ranga =

Indian actor and playwright (1950–2025)

- Born: V. Ranganathan; 1950; Viluppuram
- Died: 1 September 2025
- Occupations: Actor, playwright
- Spouse: Bhuvaneshwari
- Children: 3

V. Ranganathan (1950–1 September 2025), better known by his stage name Kuriakose Ranga, was an Indian actor and playwright, who worked in Tamil-language plays and films. He was the brother-in-law of actor, writer and director Visu.

== Career ==
V. Ranganathan was born in Viluppuram in 1950, and studied engineering in Coimbatore. He was an ardent fan of Sivaji Ganesan and played the role of Kuriakose in Visu's play Aval Sumangali Thaan; this role made him popular as "Kuriakose" Ranga. He went on to act in over 3000 plays. In the film Kudumbam Oru Kadambam (1981), the "paithiyakara" dialogue about which mental hospital will a psychiatrist go to when treating patients if he himself goes insane was written by Ranga. He also played S. Ve. Shekher's brother-in-law in Manal Kayiru (1982) and its 2016 sequel. Many of his lines were used in Samsaram Adhu Minsaram (1986). He also named Visu's talk show Arattai Arangam with the second word inspired by his real name Ranga.

== Personal life ==
Ranga was married to Bhuvaneshwari, Visu's sister who also acted in films including Kudumbam Oru Kadambam. They have three children: two sons and a daughter. Ranga died on 1 September 2025 due to ill health. His last rites were held in Chennai.

== Filmography ==
=== As an actor ===
- Kudumbam Oru Kadambam (1981)
- Manal Kayiru (1982)
- Kanmani Poonga (1982)
- Naalu Perukku Nandri (1983)
- Vaai Sollil Veeranadi (1984)
- Manal Kayiru 2 (2016)

=== As a writer ===
- Keezh Vaanam Sivakkum (1981)
- Oorukku Upadesam (1984)
- Muthukkal Moondru (1987)
