= Himashree =

Himashree is an Indian feminine given name. Notable people with the name include:

- Himashree Roy (born 1995), Indian athlete
- Hemashree or Hemashree Hosahalli Nagaraju (1982–2012), Indian actress and politician
