= Manal Kayiru =

- DVD cover
- Directed by: Visu
- Written by: Visu
- Based on: Modi Masthan by Visu
- Produced by: Rajam Balachander; Pushpa Kandhasamy
- Starring: S. Ve. Shekher; Shanthi Krishna
- Cinematography: N. Balakrishnan
- Edited by: N. R. Kittu
- Music by: M. S. Viswanathan
- Production company: Kavithalayaa Productions
- Release date: 7 May 1982
- Running time: 141 minutes
- Country: India
- Language: Tamil

Manal Kayiru (transl. Sand Rope) is a 1982 Indian Tamil-language comedy drama film written and directed by Visu in his directorial debut. The film stars S. Ve. Shekher and Shanthi Krishna, with Visu, Manorama, Kishmu and Kuriakose Ranga in supporting roles. It is based on Visu's play Modi Masthan. The film was released on 7 May 1982. A sequel, Manal Kayiru 2, was released in 2016 with Shekar, Visu, and Ranga reprising their roles.

== Plot ==
Kittumani lays down eight conditions which the girl he marries should fulfill. His uncle Naradar Naidu is fed up with looking for a suitable match for him. The eight conditions are as follows-

- As Kittumani is a B.sc, she should have started studying, but should have discontinued it in between.
- She should look pretty only to Kittumani, but not to anyone else.
- She should be bold to withstand thieves, kidnappers, etc.
- She should never weep for any reason.
- She should know how to cook both veg and non-veg as he is a vegetarian and his best friend is a non-vegetarian.
- As he can play Mridangam, she should know how to dance to it.
- Their secrets should be known to each other, but to no one else.
- After Kittumani's death, she should remarry and live happily.

At last, Naradar Naidu finds a girl who is very nice, but unfortunately doesn't fulfill any of Kittumani's condition. After some zig-zag work, he arranges their marriage. After four days, Kittumani finds that not a single condition has been fulfilled. He plans to send her out of his house, but Naidu, who pretends to support Kittumani, stops him. Later they realise that she is pregnant with Kittumani's child. After his sister is expelled from her husband's house as per Naidu's instructions and his wife is learning and speaking Hindi, Kittumani agrees to let her stay with him. He also has his own selfish reasons as he experiences much trouble cooking. At last they all convince, but Naidu is thrown out of the house as he is said to be the only reason behind the confusion. Naidu reveals that he did this as he, like Kittumani, had placed conditions which should be fulfilled by his fiancée and just before the marriage, he discovered that some conditions had not been fulfilled. The girl had killed herself and from then, Naidu had pledged to save people's lives from these types of issues.

== Cast ==
- S. Ve. Shekher as Kittumani
- Shanthi Krishna as Uma
- Visu as Naradhar Naidu
- Manorama as Durga
- Kishmu as Kamalakannan
- M. R. Rajamani as Manickam Pillai
- Kamala Kamesh as Uma's mother
- Kuriakose Ranga as Lakshmanaswamy and Ramaswamy
- Boopathy as Thangappan

== Production ==
Manal Kayiru is the directorial debut of Visu, and was adapted from his own play Modi Masthan. Maadhu Balaji was initially offered the lead role, but could not accept since his mother gave him permission to act only in stage plays. The role of the character, Kittumani, later went to S. Ve. Shekher. The film was shot in Pallavaram and Kovur, Chennai.

== Soundtrack ==
The soundtrack was composed by M. S. Viswanathan and lyrics were written by Vaali.

Track listing
No.	Title	Singer(s)	Length
1.	"Ettu Vidha Kattalaigal"	T. M. Soundararajan	4:05
2.	"Mandhira Punnagai"	S. P. Balasubrahmanyam, B. S. Sasireka	3:20
3.	"Mappillai Sir"	Malaysia Vasudevan, Manorama, Visu	5:49
Total length:			13:14

== Release and reception ==
Manal Kayiru was released on 7 May 1982. S. Shivakumar of Mid-Day gave the film a negative review, saying it "is full of inane situations with double meaning, taking unnecessary digs at politicians and crude insinuations at vulgarity" and also criticised the photography as "uniformly bad" and M. S. Viswanathan's music as "jarring and harsh on the ears". Manjula Ramesh of Kalki criticised Shekher for not being able to emote his anger without making her laugh, but appreciated Visu's acting the most of the cast.

== Sequel ==
The 2016 sequel for the film has Shekar, Visu, and Kuriakose Ranga reprising their roles, with Shekar's son Ashwin portraying the lead role.
