= Sadhyam =

- Movie poster
- Directed by: Karthikeya Gopalakrishna
- Screenplay by: Shyam Manohar
- Dialogues by: Maduri Madhu; Shyam Manohar
- Story by: Shyam Manohar
- Produced by: D. Ratna Kumar; D. Karnakar; D. Suresh
- Starring: Jagapati Babu; Priyamani
- Cinematography: Maro Palini Kumar
- Edited by: Gautham Raju
- Music by: Chinni Charan
- Production companies: Kumar Brothers Cinema (KBC Productions); Supreme Movies LLC (USA)
- Release date: 5 March 2010
- Country: India
- Language: Telugu

Sadhyam (transl. Possible) is a 2010 Indian Telugu-language romantic action film directed by Karthikeya Gopalakrishna. Jagapati Babu and Priyamani starred in lead roles and music is composed by Chinni Charan. The film was a flop at the box office.

== Cast ==
- Priyamani as Suhani
- Tanikella Bharani as Krishna Prasad
- Jagapati Babu as Sandeep, an undercover CBI officer
- Keerthi Chawla as Anita
- Kota Srinivasa Rao as Suhani's father
- C. V. L. Narasimha Rao
- Saptagiri as Waiter
- Pragathi as Lakshmi, Suhani's mother
- Satya Prakash
- Gundu Sudarshan
- Venu Yeldandi as Security guard
- Jackie
- Madhumani
- Bhargavi
- Kruthika Gupta as dancer in the song "Addanki Highway" (special appearance)

== Production ==
Priyamani played a glamorous role in the film similar to her previous film Pravarakhyudu.

== Soundtrack ==
Sadhyam

Film score by Chinni Charan
- Released: 2010
- Genre: Soundtrack
- Length: 26:19
- Label: Madhura Entertainment
- Producer: Chinni Charan

Music composed and lyrics written by Chinni Charan. Music released on Madhura Entertainment Audio Company. The audio release function took place on 20 January 2010 at Prasad Labs in Hyderabad. Tammareddy Bharadwaja, Bellamkonda Suresh, Sridhar Lagadapati and Madhu Shalini attended the function as chief guests. Nalgonda Gaddar also sang a song for the soundtrack.

No.	Title	Singer(s)	Length
1.	"Asalemayendo"	Karthik, Roshini	4:46
2.	"Sexekara"	Rita, Suchitra	4:27
3.	"Bhoom Bhoom Shaka"	Sowmya Mahadevan	4:42
4.	"Najaanay"	Rahul Nambiar	4:15
5.	"Ayyo Rama"	Chinni Charan	4:27
6.	"Addanki Highway"	R. Narsan Kasala, Geetha Madhuri	3:42
Total length:			26:19

== Release ==
The film was theatrically released on 5 March 2010 after being previously scheduled to release on 26 February 2010.
