= Kaasi (2004 film) =

- Poster
- Directed by: Lakshmi Srinivas
- Produced by: Lakshmi Srinivas
- Starring: J. D. Chakravarthy; Keerti Chawla; Brahmanandam
- Music by: Sri Kommineni
- Release date: 2 April 2004
- Country: India
- Language: Telugu

Kaasi is a 2004 Telugu drama film, starring J. D. Chakravarthy and Keerti Chawla.

== Cast ==
- J. D. Chakravarthy as Kaasi
- Keerthi Chawla as Anjali
- Devan as GK
- Brahmanandam as Kankipadu Kanta Rao
- Uttej as Swati Mutyam
- Shiva Reddy as DTS
- Venu Madhav as Okkadu
- Varsha as Swati
- AVS
- G. V. Sudhakar Naidu as Police Officer
- Shanoor Sana

== Reception ==
A critic from The Hindu wrote that "The director tries to be different but he flip-flops as he goes about his job. Had he tightened the screenplay by chopping the inane comedy track and numerous stunts, the film would have been more interesting." A critic from Idlebrain wrote that "Over all, the film falls little short of the threshold value and may not click at box office. But, you may watch it at your leisure."
