= Keerthi Chawla =

Indian actress

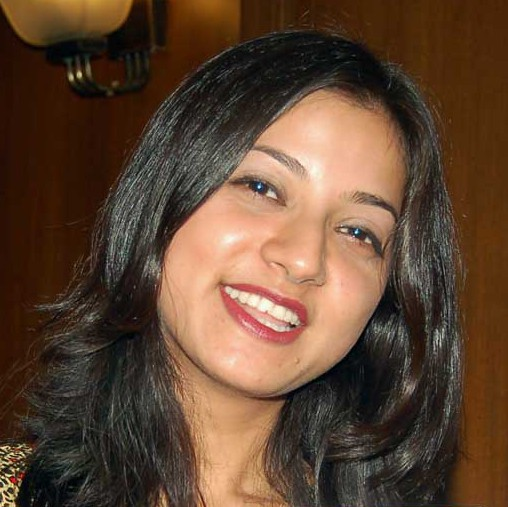
- Born: Keerthi Chawla; Andhra Pradesh, India
- Occupation: Actress
- Years active: 1997–2025

Keerthi Chawla is an Indian actress, who worked in Tamil, Telugu, Hindi and Kannada film industry. She has appeared in some well-known films, such as Aadi, Aalwar, Naan Avanillai and Uliyin Osai.

== Filmography ==
Year	Film	Role	Language	Notes
1997	Ghulam-E-Mustafa	Vidya	Hindi	
1998	Himmatwala	Kajal	Hindi	
1999	Trishakti	Priyanka	Hindi	Credited as Radhika
2002	Aadi	Nandu Reddy	Telugu	
2002	Manmadhudu	Herself	Telugu	Special appearance
2004	Dharma		Telugu	
2004	Bidalaare	Gowri	Kannada	
2004	Kaasi	Anjali	Telugu	
2005	Sravana Masam		Telugu	
2005	Aanai	Sandhya	Tamil	
2006	Iddaru Attala Muddula Alludu		Telugu	
2006	Dattha	Kavya	Kannada	
2007	Aalwar	Madhu	Tamil	
2007	Naan Avanillai	Rani Das	Tamil	
2007	Piragu	Thulasi	Tamil	
2008	Uliyin Osai	Chamundi, Panchavan Mahadevi	Tamil	
2008	Nalla Ponnu Ketta Paiyyan	Savithri Anand	Tamil	
2008	Suryaa	Jyothi	Tamil	
2008	Nee Tata Naa Birla	Vandana	Kannada	
2008	Nayagan	Divya	Tamil	
2008	Mahesh, Saranya Matrum Palar	Herself	Tamil	special appearance
2008	Swetha 5/10 Wellington Road	Swetha	Tamil	
2009	Mast Maja Maadi	Herself	Kannada	special appearance in song "Shakalaka Bhoom"
2010	Sadhyam	Anita	Telugu	
2011	Mudhal Idam		Tamil	Special appearance
2011	Broker	Vadani	Telugu	
2012	Kasi Kuppam		Tamil	
2013	Thirumathi Thamizh	Charumathi	Tamil	
2014	Ninaivil Nindraval		Tamil	
2016	Ilamai Oonjal	Herself	Tamil	
2025	Laila	Sita	Telugu	
