= Ninaivil Nindraval (2014 film) =

2014 Indian film by Agasthiya Bharathi

- Theatrical release poster
- Directed by: Agasthiya Bharathi
- Screenplay by: S. Ve. Sekhar
- Produced by: Sree Sabari Movies
- Starring: Ashwin Shekhar; Keerthi Chawla; Gayathiri Iyer
- Cinematography: N. Ravi
- Edited by: Suresh Urs
- Music by: D. Imman
- Production company: Sree Sabari Movies
- Release date: 31 January 2014
- Country: India
- Language: Tamil

Ninaivil Nindraval (transl. She remembered) is a 2014 Tamil-language film directed by Agasthiya Bharathi and produced by Sree Sabari Movies. The film features Ashwin Shekhar, Keerthi Chawla and Gayathiri Iyer in the lead roles, while D. Imman composes the film's music. The film, which began in 2008, went through significant production delays before releasing on 31 January 2014.

== Cast ==
- Ashwin Shekhar as Ramana
- Keerthi Chawla
- Gayathri
- S. Ve. Sekhar
- Thalaivasal Vijay
- Ilavarasan
- Kadhal Sukumar
- Vaiyapuri
- Chinni Jayanth
- M. S. Bhaskar
- Sona Heiden
- Manobala
- Archana Mariappan

== Production ==
Production on the film began in April 2008, with Ashwin Sekhar appearing in his second film. The film, which was also announced to feature Keerthi Chawla and Gayathri in lead roles, was to be directed by newcomer Agasthiya Bharathi. The film was initially reported to be scheduled for a release date in September 2008, though delays meant the deadline was not met.

The audio and trailer of the film were released in July 2011 in an event attended by Union Minister of Shipping, G. K. Vasan and the first copy was received by G. Asokan, publisher of pocket novels, along with members of the film unit. However the film was further delayed and remained unreleased. The director of the film, Agasthya Bharathi died in 2012 before the film released.

The film was screened in January 2014 for the film industry, with S. Ve. Sekhar taking up the duty to release the film. The film was also briefly called Ninaivil Niraivil as the team geared up for release, but was eventually released under the original title.

== Soundtrack ==
The songs for the film were composed by D. Imman and lyrics written by Vaali, and were released in July 2011. The soundtrack contains a remix version of "Nila Adhu" from Nayakan (1987).

Track title	Lyricist	Singer(s)
"Chinna Poove"	Vaali	Balram, Anuradha Shekhar
"Kalvane En Kalvane"	Vaali	Bombay Jayashri, Sricharan
"Nila Adhu"	Vaali	Seerkazhi Sivachidambaram, Anuradha Shekhar
"Senthamizhe"	Kirithiya	Benny Dayal, Shweta Mohan, Dinesh Kanagaratnam
"Sollitaru Thalaivar"	Vaali	Naresh Iyer, Ashwin Shekhar, Sheeba
"Ennavale"	Kirithiya	Vijay Yesudas

== Release and reception ==
The film was released on 31 January 2014. The reviewer from The New Indian Express stated "the director has confined the narration to less than two hours and touched on an issue rarely handled on screen by taking a nice stand on it is appreciable."
