= Iddaru Attala Muddula Alludu =

- DVD Cover
- Directed by: Dev Anand
- Written by: Dev Anand (dialogues)
- Screenplay by: Smt. Gabbita Sudarmana
- Story by: Smt. Gabbita Sudarmana
- Produced by: Smt. Gabbita Sudarmana
- Starring: Rajendra Prasad; Keerthi Chawla; Kovai Harathi; Suman
- Cinematography: Kishan Sagar
- Edited by: V. Rambabu
- Music by: Prasad; Ramana Oogethi (Background Score)
- Production company: Siva Shakti Films
- Release date: 9 June 2006
- Running time: 126 mins
- Country: India
- Language: Telugu

Iddaru Attala Muddula Alludu (transl. Charming Son-in-law of Two Mothers-in-law) is a 2006 Telugu-language comedy film, produced by Smt. Gabbita Sudarmana on Siva Shakti Films banner and directed by Dev Anand. Starring Rajendra Prasad, Keerthi Chawla, Kovai Harathi, Suman and music composed by Prasad. The film was loosely inspired from Tamil film Summa Irunga Machan.

== Cast ==
- Rajendra Prasad as Balu
- Keerthi Chawla as Vandana
- Kovai Harathi as Chandana
- Suman as Gangadharam
- Seetha as Seeta
- Kovai Sarala as Sarala
- Narra Venkateswara Rao
- Venu Madhav
- Gundu Hanumantha Rao
- Kallu Chidambaram
- Gowtham Raju
- Kadamdari Kiran
- Alapati Lakshmi
- Jeeva
- Jenny

== Soundtrack ==
Iddaru Attala Muddula Alludu

Film score by Prasad
- Released: 2006
- Genre: Soundtrack
- Length: 19:31
- Label: Madhura Audio
- Producer: Prasad

Music composed by Prasad. Music released on MADHURA Audio Company.

No.	Title	Lyrics	Singer(s)	Length
1.	"Hitech City Pori"	Surendra Krishna	Jassie Gift	3:48
2.	"Fair And Lovely Face"	Vishnu Sri	Tippu, Sujatha	3:52
3.	"ABCDF"	Bharathi Babu	Mano, Malathi	3:54
4.	"Tik Tik Tik"	Sai Sriharsha	Murali, Harini	4:14
5.	"Suryudu Okkade"	Prasad	Chandrateja	3:43
Total length:				19:31
