= Kudumbam Oru Kadambam =

1981 film by S. P. Muthuraman

- Poster
- Directed by: S. P. Muthuraman
- Written by: Visu
- Based on: Kudumbam Oru Kadambam by Visu
- Produced by: L. N. Nachiappan; L. N. Chidambaram; S. Muthusami
- Starring: Pratap; Suhasini; Sumalatha; S. Ve. Shekher; Visu
- Cinematography: Babu
- Edited by: R. Vittal
- Music by: M. S. Viswanathan
- Production company: Visakam Pictures
- Release date: 5 December 1981
- Running time: 144 minutes
- Country: India
- Language: Tamil

Kudumbam Oru Kadambam (transl. Family is a Flower) is a 1981 Indian Tamil-language drama film directed by S. P. Muthuraman. Based on Visu's play of the same name, the film stars Pratap, Suhasini, Sumalatha, S. Ve. Shekher and Visu reprising his role from the play. It was released on 5 December 1981. The film was remade in Kannada as Ananda Sagara (1983), in Telugu as Manishiko Charithra (1984), in Hindi as Aaj Ka Daur (1985), and in Malayalam as Oru Sandesam Koodi (1985).

== Plot ==
The film opens on an ordinary day in the lives of the families in a large apartment house in Chennai. Each family represents a different slice of early 1980s middle-class society. Kannan and Uma are a working couple. Kannan's father, retired from Government service, lives with them. They enjoy the comforts of dual income, but their general lament is that their long work hours compel them to send their five-year-old daughter Priya to boarding school.

The second couple comprises real estate agent Paramasivam and his homemaker wife Parvathi. Real estate in the early 1980s is not very profitable or progressive. Paramasivam and Parvathi enjoy a happy marriage, but Paramasivam's limited (and sporadic) income is barely able to meet household costs.

The third couple is Srinivasa Raghavan and Lakshmiammal. Fifty-five-year-old Srinivasa Raghavan is a worthless wastrel. In spite of a college education, he has never worked a day in his life. He chooses to roam about the city and engage in pointless banter with anyone he can find. Lakshmiammal works as a cook to earn a meager wage, but they frequently have to pawn their valuables to get by. Their son Madhu is an aspiring actor with dreams of making it big, and their daughter Mythili is still in high school.

Their everyday lives have ups and downs. Kannan and Uma work all through the week. Uma takes German lessons in the evenings. Their overburdened schedule permits them to see their daughter only on weekends, and as a result they gradually drift away from the needs of their child. As for Paramasivam, his income is squeezed by the down market or by crafty tenants (who collude with the owners and ultimately do not pay his commissions). Lakshmiammal works long hours in hot kitchens, and worries that her declining health might just give out one day.

There are some new arrivals. The first is Parvathi's brother Kumar. Kumar has recently graduated from college, and he arrives in Chennai to start a new job. He plans to stay with Parvathi for a few days until he finds a new place. The second arrival is Anandan, a mild-mannered young man. He used to work at a rice mill in Nagapatnam, but when the mill was destroyed in a cyclone, his employer transferred him to another job in Chennai. Anandan is happy to find another job, but despairs because he is away from his wife and children in Nagapatnam. He is not able to afford weekly trips to see his family. Lakshmiammal recognises an opportunity and proposes a boarding arrangement. Anandan is happy to accept; Lakshmiammal's home cooked food is healthier and cheaper than eating out every day.

The families are faced with various crises. Kannan's father discovers that Lakshmiammal has been visiting a hospital to treat an emerging tuberculosis ailment caused by long exposure to cooking flames. Kannan's father discreetly informs Mythili that Lakshmiammal must not continue working. Mythili drops out of school and starts working at a palatial mansion in the city. (Her job is not revealed, but it is strongly suggested that she may be working as an escort for a rich man.) The job, however, pays quite well and Mythili anonymously sends a portion of the money to her mother. Srinivasa Raghavan remains oblivious or apathetic to the whole situation.

Kannan and Paramasivam are also faced with trouble. Uma receives a promotion at work. Kannan is unable to accept that his wife makes more money. Priya continues to drift away from her parents, and refuses to come home for Diwali. When Parvathi suddenly becomes pregnant, she is forced to abort because of their strained financial situation. Paramasivam is stricken cold by the fact that he did not have cash for the cab to bring his wife to the hospital. Uma, Parvathi and Lakshmiammal individually ponder the central questions of the film – the role of money and the role of working women in the new society order.

Their troubles escalate. Kannan dreams that Uma is seduced by her German boss, and that she will eventually leave him. Paramasivam is compelled to borrow money, at exorbitant interest, from a loan shark. Parvathi is deeply grieved to learn this. Lakshmiammal follows Mythili and assumes the worst when she sees that a car is sent to fetch Mythili every day. She breaks down in tears before Srinivasa Raghavan. When Srinivasa Raghavan angrily question Mythili, she retorts that he, having never provided for the family, has no fatherly rights to ask about her business.

The men set about evaluating their situation. Kannan and Uma decide that their child is a higher priority than additional income, and Uma accordingly resigns from her job. Kannan's father provides additional support by way of his retirement income. Paramasivam finally agrees to let Parvathi get a real job. And Srinivasa Raghavan, stung by his daughter's criticism, sets off to find work. Undaunted by rejection from various offices, he finally earns a day's wages by working on the docks. He returns home with dignity. Now that he has restored his station as a father, he claims the right to question Mythili. He bluntly asks if she has been prostituting herself. Mythili takes him to the palatial mansion. She reveals that the lady of the house has been stricken with a paralysing disease and that Mythili's job is to help her with her daily duties. Mythili breaks into sobs, saying she has not done anything to dishonor the family.

Harmony is restored to just about everyone. Anandam, in tragicomic irony, is suddenly transferred away to Dindigul just as he has found a job for his wife in Chennai. His wife now takes his place in the apartment and writes to him every week.

The film ends with the missive that money is required for life but life must not be entirely consumed by money.

== Cast ==
- Pratap as Kannan
- Suhasini as Parvathi
- Sumalatha as Uma
- S. Ve. Shekher as Paramasivam
- Kamala Kamesh as Lakshmiammal
- Nithya as Mythili
- Bhoopathi
- Samikannu as the matchmaker
- Goundamani as Chettiar
- Visu as Srinivasa Raghavan
- Kuriakose Ranga as Anandan
- Omakuchi Narasimhan as Mathrubootham
- Baskar as Kumar

== Production ==
Kudumbam Oru Kadambam was a play written by Visu who also starred in it. S. P. Muthuraman saw the play and, impressed, decided to adapt it for the screen; Visu was chosen to reprise his role, making his debut as a film actor despite warning from Muthuraman's friends. Visu's brother-in-law Kuriakose Ranga also made his film debut with this; he also wrote the dialogue "Paithiyakaara aaspathirila paithiyangalukku vaithiyam pakkara oru paithiyakaara vaithiyarukke paithiyam pudicha, andha paithiyakara vaithiyar endha paithiyakara haspathirila paithiyangalukku vaithiyam pakara oru paithiyakara vaithiyar kitta than paithiyathukku vaithiyanm pathupaar?" (transl. If a doctor treating mentally ill patients at a mental asylum himself becomes mentally ill, to which mental asylum will the mentally ill doctor go and get treated for his mental illness and which mentally ill doctor who treats mentally ill patients will treat him?). Kamala Kamesh was cast after Visu was impressed with her performance in Kudisai (1979). She had played the female lead role in the play, but that character was played by Suhasini in the film adaptation. The film was completely shot in a house set built at Karpagam Studios.

== Soundtrack ==
The soundtrack was composed by M. S. Viswanathan.

Track listing
No.	Title	Lyrics	Singer(s)	Length
1.	"Kudumbam Oru Kadambam"	Kannadasan	M. S. Viswanathan	4:31
2.	"Kalviyil Saraswati"	Vaali	Vani Jairam, S. P. Sailaja, Uma Ramanan, B. S. Sasirekha	7:06
3.	"Engaathu Mappillai Nee"	Vaali	S. Janaki, S. P. Balasubrahmanyam	6:56
Total length:				18:33

== Release and reception ==
Kudumbam Oru Kadambam was released on 5 December 1981. The film was a commercial success, running for over 100 days in theatres. Nalini Sastry of Kalki wrote Visu has made S. P. Muthuraman jobless, more than half of the film is shot on the set, it creates an illusion of drama, sound recording looks like heard from well, the camera is not too difficult, only the drama lends a hand and concluded all that remains is the feeling of watching a good comedy cum serious family drama. Saavi praised the acting of Visu, Kamala and Suhasini but panned the acting of Sekhar and music and concluded praising Muthuraman for directing a stage play into an exciting film. According to Kamala, the film, along with Alaigal Oivathillai (1981), was responsible for her being typecast in elderly or middle-aged roles.

== Remakes ==
The film was remade in Kannada as Ananda Sagara (1983), in Telugu as Manishiko Charithra (1984), in Malayalam as Oru Sandesam Koodi (1985) and in Hindi as Aaj Ka Daur (1985).
