= Pellaina Kothalo =

- DVD cover
- Directed by: Madan
- Written by: Madan
- Produced by: Madan
- Starring: Jagapati Babu; Priyamani
- Cinematography: T. Surendra Reddy
- Edited by: Nandamuri Hari
- Music by: Agastya
- Production company: Aa Naluguru Films
- Release date: 8 December 2006
- Running time: 151 minutes
- Country: India
- Language: Telugu

Pellaina Kothalo (transl. While just married) is a 2006 Indian Telugu-language romance film, produced and directed by Madan on Aa Naluguru Films banner. The film stars Jagapati Babu, Priyamani, and music composed by Agastya.

== Plot ==
The film begins with two software engineers, Veeramachineni Harikrishna & Lakshmi, who are pantophobic and testy. Moreover, the two consistently rely on their best friends, Bhagawan & Janaki. A dominating wife & husband invariably suppress their spouse Satyabhama & Chalapati, respectively. Elders formally arrange Hari & Lakshmi's matchmaking, Pelli Choopulu, and they like each other and knit each other. But their trains indoctrinate their mindset in the name of ascendancy and personal freedom. Additionally, it advises that the ' first night' is the right time to keep the partner under the toe.

Once Lakshmi's old mate, Prakash, arrives to arouse her husband, Lakshmi pretends to be close to him. Fortuitously, his wife Astha is Hari's previous salsa tutor and has an infatuation with him. So, he also repeats the same, which enrages their ego, and silly squabbles launch. Eventually, the couple decide to split. Simultaneously, Hari's grandparents arrive from their village and Hari & Lakshmi enact affinity to gratify them. The elders invite the twosome to the town to conduct a heritage ritual, Dampatya Vratam.

Accordingly, they proceed and start the ritual. As a result, intimacy and friendliness emerge between the couple. Parallelly, Bhagawan & Janaki know that it is just their consort's virtue to surrender to them and transform. Besides, Hari & Lakshmi discover the entire ritual is fake, forged by old men, and freak out. At that point, the older people affirm that being conscious of their marital life, they made this play. Thus, to impress upon them that nuptial is neither agreement nor adjustment, it is holy bondage. Hearing it, soul-searching starts inside the duet, who realizes the eminence of marriage and the importance of the better half. Finally, the movie ends happily with the first night of Hari & Lakshmi.

== Cast ==
- Jagapati Babu as Veeramachineni Harikrishna "Hari"
- Priyamani as Lakshmi "Lucky"/Lucy
- Astha Singhal as Astha "Chintu"
- Raju Sundaram as Prakash
- Kota Srinivasa Rao as Veeraraju, Hari's grandfather
- Brahmanandam
- Sunil as Chalapathi
- Ali as Ali
- Dharmavarapu Subramanyam as Priest
- M. S. Narayana as Lakshmi's uncle
- Venu Madhav as Venu Madhav
- Giribabu
- Ahuti Prasad as Hari's father
- Krishna Bhagawan as Bhagawan
- Shankar Melkote as Ali's boss
- Madhu
- Geetanjali as Hari's grandmother
- Kovai Sarala
- Jhansi as Janaki
- Hema as Satya Bhama
- Gundu Sudarshan as Traffic Police Officer
- Rajitha as Lakshmi's aunt
- Madhumani
- Devisri
- Sushma
- Waheeda Rehman as a servant at Hari's grandfather's house

== Soundtrack ==
Pellaina Kothalo

Film score by Agashtya
- Released: 2006
- Genre: Soundtrack
- Length: 25:53
- Label: Aditya Music
- Producer: Agashtya

Music composed by Agashtya. Music released on ADITYA Music Company.

No.	Title	Lyrics	Singer(s)	Length
1.	"Siri Siri Muvvalle"	Vennelakanti	Shreya Ghoshal	5:03
2.	"Chelivo"	Chaitanya Prasad	Karthik, Rita	4:35
3.	"Harilo Ranga Hari"	Uma Maheswar	Tippu, Maya	4:44
4.	"Salsa Samba"	Chaitanya Prasad	Tippu, Rajyalakshmi	4:20
5.	"Manasu Kannu"	Veturi	S. P. Balasubrahmanyam	6:08
6.	"Sapta Jagathi"	Chaitanya Prasad	Chorus	1:13
Total length:				25:53

== Reception ==
Jeevi of idlebrain.com wrote that the film "showcases Jagapati Babu’s brilliance as an actor all over again".
