= Aaj Ka Daur =

1985 Indian Hindi film

- Directed by: K. Bapayya
- Written by: Kader Khan (dialogues)
- Screenplay by: Selvaraj
- Story by: Visu
- Produced by: Chintapalli Prasad
- Starring: Jackie Shroff; Padmini Kolhapure
- Cinematography: A. Venkat
- Edited by: V. R. Kotagiri
- Music by: Bappi Lahiri
- Production company: Sree Kanakadurga Art Productions
- Release date: 1985
- Running time: 153 minutes
- Country: India
- Language: Hindi

Aaj Ka Daur (transl. Today's Era) is a 1985 Indian Hindi-language drama film directed by K. Bapayya. The film stars Jackie Shroff and Padmini Kolhapure, and it is a remake of the 1981 Tamil film Kudumbam Oru Kadambam. According to Pratiksha Mestry of Mid-Day, Aaj Ka Daur, along with Himmatwala (1983), are great attempts at comedy for Kader Khan. For his work, Khan received a nomination for the Best Performance in a Comic Role at the 33rd Filmfare Awards.

== Plot ==
This film is about a university graduate Raja, who can get no better job than a petrol pump employee, a girl Durga, who is struggling to pay for college and others in a building owned by Fakeerchand, who attempts to evict them with the help of a criminal Leo.

== Cast ==
- Jackie Shroff as Raja
- Padmini Kolhapure as Durga Agnihotri
- Prem Chopra as Fakeerchand
- Nirupa Roy as Laxmi Agnihotri
- Kader Khan as Vishwapratap Gyandev Agnihotri
- Shakti Kapoor as Leo
- Aruna Irani as Neeta ,Mrs. Leo
- Bindu as Bijli
- Sachin Pilgaonkar as Pratap
- Shoma Anand as Sharda
- Raj Kiran as Ram
- Roshni as Seeta
- Iftekhar as Wealthy Man Shyamlal Kapoor
- Goga Kapoor as Randhir Swami, Leo's Boss
- Deep Dhillon as Sharma, Sharda's Boss
- Manik Irani as Jango
- Vikas Anand as Police Inspector Mohan Mehra

== Soundtrack ==
Composed by Bappi Lahiri and written by Indeevar, the soundtrack includes the following songs:

Song	Singer
"Petrol Bharo Jaldi Karo Meri Gaadi Kab Se Khadi Hai"	Kishore Kumar, Alka Yagnik
"Hum Tujh Par Hi Shaida Hue Hai Tere Liye Hi Paida Hue Hai"	Kishore Kumar, Asha Bhosle
"Gori Gori Gori Gori Tan Tera Roop Ki Nadiya"	Kishore Kumar, Asha Bhosle
"Shanivaar Tak Woh Officer Rehta Hai"	Shabbir Kumar, Asha Bhosle
"Yeh Daur, Aaj Ka Daur Hai"	K. J. Yesudas

== Accolades ==
Award	Category	Recipient(s) and nominee(s)	Result	Ref.
Filmfare Awards	Best Performance in a Comic Role	Kader Khan	Nominated	
