= Ashiq Vanna Divasam =

- Official poster
- Directed by: Krish Kymal
- Written by: Krish Kymal
- Produced by: Naseer Lathif
- Starring: Priyamani; Naseer Latif
- Cinematography: Krish Kymal
- Music by: Mathew Pulikkal
- Production company: Peanuts International
- Release date: 15 June 2018
- Running time: 122 minutes
- Country: India
- Language: Malayalam

Aashiq Vanna Divasam (released internationally as The Day Ashiq Came) is a 2018 Indian Malayalam-language children's drama film directed by Krish Kymal and starring Priyamani and Naseer Latif.

== Cast ==
- Priyamani as Shiny
- Nasser Latif as Maash
- Kanchanamma as Lakshmi
- Ambika Mohan as Mariya
- Kalasala Babu
- Irshad
- Kalabhavan Haneef
- Baby Piya
- Master Dupath

== Production ==
The film is directed, written and cinematographed by Krish Kymal of Olappeeppi (2016) fame while Naseer Lathif produced the film in addition to acting. This film marks Priyamani's return to Malayalam cinema. Aashiq Vanna Divasam is about inter-caste marriage. The film began production in early 2017 with the first schedule in Kochi. The poem "Aaru Njanakanam" was included in this film. The film finished production in late 2017.

== Reception ==
A critic wrote that "Aashiq Vanna Divasam faces the problem of how to keep the audience engaged till they are led to the major theme. The conflict is apt for the drama but the issue is how long you bear the same thing that gets repeated? The mediocre treatment conveys the same impact".

== Awards and nominations ==
Krish Kymal was one among the directors nominated for the Kerala State Film Award for Best Director. The film was screened at various film festivals.
