= Kandha Kadamba Kathir Vela =

- Directed by: Rama Narayanan
- Written by: Rama Narayanan; Pugazhmani (dialogues)
- Produced by: N. Radha
- Starring: Prabhu; S. Ve. Shekher; Vivek; Vadivelu; Roja; Nirosha; Kovai Sarala
- Cinematography: N. K. Viswanathan
- Edited by: Rajkeerthi
- Music by: S. A. Rajkumar
- Production company: Sri Thenandal Films
- Release date: 6 May 2000
- Country: India
- Language: Tamil

Kandha Kadamba Kathir Vela is a 2000 Indian Tamil-language comedy film written and directed by Rama Narayanan. The film is loosely based on Poova Thalaiya (1969). The film was remade in Kannada as Namma Samsara Ananda Sagara (2001).

== Plot ==
Parvathi is rich and arrogant and lives with her three sons: Kandha, Kadamba, and Kathirvela. The sons are obedient to their mother and run a restaurant in Chennai. Parvathi also had a daughter named Mallika, who married Vadivelan, a barber. After this, Parvathi disowned Mallika. Vadivelan decides to teach Parvathi a lesson. He understands that Parvathi's sons are in love with girls from an economically backward community and schemes to have them marry against Parvathi's wishes. Kandha marries Rupini, Kadamba, Rohini, and Kathir, Ragini.

Parvathi had planned to have her sons marry into a rich family from London, hoping for a hefty dowry, and she hates her daughters-in-law because they are poor. Also, her sons support their wives, further angering her. Parvathi schemes to separate her sons from their wives. She feigns affection towards her daughters-in-law and persuades them to stay away from their husbands. She also brings a new maid to their home and creates fear in the minds of her daughters-in-law about their husbands having affairs with the new maid.

Parvathi succeeds: her daughters-in-law leave her home following a misunderstanding with her sons. Now, she plans to convince her sons to divorce their wives and have them marry her choices. However, the maid (appointed by Parvathi) threatens her and demands Rs. 5 crores to not reveal the truth. The maid and her men kidnap Parvathi. But her sons and daughters-in-law save her. Then she appreciates her daughters-in-law. She also accepts her daughter and Vadivelan.

== Cast ==
- Prabhu as Kandha
- S. Ve. Shekher as Kadamba
- Vivek as Kathirvela
- Vadivelu as Vadivelan
- Roja as Rupini
- Nirosha as Ragini
- Kovai Sarala as Rohini
- Latha as Parvathi Amma
- Vennira Aadai Moorthy as Subbiah
- Bhanusri as Kunnakudi Vallikannu
- Bhuvaneswari as Mallika, Vadivelan's wife
- Shivani
- Kullamani as hotel customer
- Madurai Shahul Hameed
- Appasamy
- Auroville Durai as Durai
- Vengal Rao as Henchman
- K. Sivasankar in a special appearance

== Soundtrack ==
The soundtrack was composed by S. A. Rajkumar.

Song	Singers	Lyrics
"Eduda Namma"	Anuradha Sriram, S. A. Rajkumar	Kalidasan
"Kandha Kadamba"	Mano, Vadivelu, Vivek	Kalidasan
"Nalla Pasamulla"	Mano, Malaysia Vasudevan	Kalidasan
"Pathumani"	Anuradha Sriram, Mano	Viveka
"Thenatru Meena" (Not in film)	K. S. Chithra, Prabhakar	Piraisoodan

== Reception ==
Krishna Chidambaram of Kalki wrote just like when the answer sheets are snatched away in an exam because it is time over, it is as if someone snatched the film roll from Rama Narayanan's hand to the point that it was enough to take the film and we laugh at the way the film ended so bluntly and concluded asking if is this a comedy film. Malathi Rangarajan of The Hindu wrote "So what if the film lacks originality in story and music? (And in some places it is only too obvious.) Or what is wrong if a couple of punch lines remind you of the dialogue you have already heard in a successful film released some years ago? As long as the audiences all over are satisfied with formula- ridden fare and cliches, the rest hardly matters. These are the conclusions you draw after watching Sri Thenandal Films' Kandha Kadamba Kadhir-Vela". Malini Mannath of Chennai Online wrote "The ingredients of a typical Ramanarayanan film are all found here too - a silly story line, a script that even a child can grasp, and crude comedy that would make his fans roll in mirth and the others squirm in embarrassment".
