= Madan (director) =

Indian film director (died 2022)

- Born: Ramigani Madan; Madanpalli, Chittoor district, Andhra Pradesh, India
- Died: 19 November 2022; Hyderabad, Telangana, India
- Occupations: Film director, Writer, Producer

Ramigani Madan Mohan Reddy (died 19 November 2022), better known as R. R. Madan or simply Madan, was an Indian Telugu film director, writer and producer.

== Early life and career ==
He was born and brought up in Madanapalle, Chittoor district of Andhra Pradesh. He has done his graduation from Sri Venkateswara University, Tirupathi at Annie Besant Theosophical College, Madanapalli. He used to write short stories and direct play-lets during his college days. Later he moved to Hyderabad where the regional Film Industry in Telugu language is located. He worked for 2 years as an assistant cameraman under Mr. S. Gopal Reddy, a popular film cameraman. Later he has worked as a co-writer for a few films.

In 2004, he became popular by the film Aa Naluguru one of the classic Telugu films, as a script writer. He penned story, screen play and dialogues for Aa Naluguru.- starring Rajendra Prasad. The movie has thought provoking message and received three Andhra Pradesh State Nandi Awards i.e. Best film, Best actor and Best character. In 2006, under his own banner "Aa Naluguru films," he had written, produced and directed Pellaina Kothalo starring Jagapathi Babu and Priyamani. The film was well received by the audience particularly by the youth and went on to become a super hit movie.

Madan died from a stroke on 19 November 2022.

== Filmography ==
Year	Film	Credited as			Notes
Year	Film	Director	Writer	Producer	Notes
2004	Aa Naluguru	No	Yes	No	
2006	Pellaina Kothalo	Yes	Yes	Yes	
2008	Gunde Jhallumandi	Yes	Yes	No	
2009	Pravarakhyudu	Yes	Yes	No	
2013	Coffee With My Wife	No	Yes	Presenter	Kannada film
2016	Garam	Yes	Screenplay	No	
2018	Gayatri	Yes	No	No	
