= Raam (2009 film) =

- Promotional poster
- Directed by: K. Madesh
- Written by: M. S. Ramesh (dialogues)
- Screenplay by: K. Madesh
- Story by: Gopimohan; Kona Venkat
- Based on: Ready by Srinu Vaitla
- Produced by: Aditya Babu
- Starring: Puneeth Rajkumar; Priyamani
- Cinematography: A. V. Krishna Kumar
- Edited by: T. Shashikumar, Deepu S. Kumar
- Music by: V. Harikrishna
- Production company: Adithya Arts
- Distributed by: Jayanna Films
- Release date: 25 December 2009
- Running time: 150 minutes
- Country: India
- Language: Kannada

Raam is a 2009 Indian Kannada-language romantic comedy movie released in 2009 directed by K. Madesh starring Puneeth Rajkumar and Priyamani, who made her debut in Kannada cinema. Harikrishna is the music director for the movie. The movie is a remake of 2008 Telugu film Ready.

== Plot ==
Ram, a final-year B.E student studying in Bellary comes to visit his joint family in Mysore during his vacation. His cousin's marriage is fixed but his cousin loves another NRI Boy. Knowing this Raam helps his cousin marry her lover. This angers his uncle, who expels him from the house. He returns to his university. He sees a girl and falls in love with her at first sight. Meanwhile, his friend becomes depressed on losing his lady love as her parents disapproved of their marriage and fixed her marriage with another boy. Ram decides to bring her and have her marry his friend. He goes to R.R. Kalyana Mantapa, kidnaps the bride unconscious and brings her. He later realises that he has kidnapped the wrong bride. When Ram saw the girl he becomes happy for it was the girl Pooja he loved. When she regained consciousness she is elated as she did not want to get married. She forces Ram and his friends to leave her at the bus stand. To escape from the goon, Ram and Pooja get lost in the forest. They leave the forest and leave her at the bus stand where he meets his friend. They leave Pooja and carry on. She calls her friend and is informed that it takes fifteen days for her visa to be processed. She is depressed. Some goons follow her. She runs. Ram and his friend rescue her. He tells her to stay in his house by lying to them that she is an orphan and Shastri who is Ram's family friend brought her up in his ashrama. She tells the same to Ram's family. Later Ram apologises to his uncle and returns. Love blossoms between them. Elders decides to get them married. They take her to Shastri's ashrama to talk about the marriage proposal with him. While some men take her away in spite of being protected by Ram's family members. Later Ram reveals what was going on. They decide to help Pooja. The people who take Pooja away are attacked by some other men. The other men take her away. Raam knocks him unconscious. She tells him her story. Pooja's father's two sisters were married to Pooja's mother's brothers. The two brothers are separated due to a property fight. And Pooja grows up in America and she is the sole heiress of 100 crores. Her parents die in an accident. Then she goes to India to live with her uncles. But she learns that the two brothers are separated. The two brothers want to have their sons marry Pooja for her money. Both fight for this. By that time Ram had kidnapped her from the marriage hall. After knowing this, Ram promises her that he will marry her in the presence of her uncles without violence using his brain. He joins her uncles' house as an accountant. Ram's uncle and aunt come in disguise as Chicago Chandrashekar and his wife and asks for Pooja's uncle's son for their nonexistent daughter. They tell him that they own 150 crores. Knowing this Pooja's uncle leaves Pooja for his brother's son. While Ram's parents come and in disguise as Dollar Dinesh who is Chicago Chandrashekar's brother and asks for Pooja's second uncle's son for their nonexistent daughter. Pooja's second uncle agrees. Ram's last uncle comes as Swiss Bank manager and lies that Pooja's father had taken a loan of 150 crore. Pooja's uncles decide to have her marry Ram as he had no money. After the marriage they learn the truth and regret their mistake and ask Pooja for forgiveness. Her uncles unite and bless the newly married couple and thank Ram and his family for teaching them a lesson and send Pooja with Ram and his family to Mysore.

== Cast ==
- Puneeth Rajkumar as Raam
- Priyamani as Pooja
- Rangayana Raghu as M C Krishna Murthy
- Doddanna as Dodda Mallayya, Pooja's elder maternal uncle
- Sharath Lohitashwa as Chikka Mallayya, Pooja's younger maternal uncle
- Srinath as Raghunath Prasad, Ram's first uncle
- Arun Sagar as Ramaa
- Sundar Raj
- M. S. Umesh
- Padma Vasanthi as Dodda Mallayya's wife
- Sangeetha
- Achyuth Kumar as Raam's father
- Tilak Shekar as Nagraja, Dodda Mallayya's son
- Dharma
- Shobhraj
- Sadhu Kokila as Santhosh alias Happy
- Mohan Juneja
- Prakash Shenoy
- Jai Dev
- Imran
- Kuri Prathap
- Nanda Kishore
- Sadashiva Brahmavar as Ganapati Shastry
- Lakshmi Hegde
- Shashikala
- Rekha V. Kumar
- Rani Dhamukumar
- Jyothi Gurucharan
- Malathi Sardeshpande
- Chithra Shenoy
- Apoorva
- Venkata Ram
- Mandeep Rai
- Dr. Nagesh kaveti
- Ramesh Babu
- Chetan (cameo appearance)
- Sonu Gowda (cameo appearance)

== Production ==
{production under aditya arts by aditya babu}}

== Soundtrack ==
Raam

Soundtrack album by V. Harikrishna
- Released: Nov 27, 2009
- Recorded: 2009
- Genre: Feature film soundtrack
- Length: 27:04
- Label: Anand Audio
- Producer: V. Harikrishna
External audio
- Official Audio Jukebox on YouTube

Soundtrack was composed by V. Harikrishna.

No.	Title	Lyrics	Singer(s)	Length
1.	"Le Le Ammana Magale"	V. Nagendra Prasad	Tippu, Megha	4:42
2.	"Neenendare"	V. Nagendra Prasad	Sonu Nigam, Nanditha	4:38
3.	"Nanna Tutiyalli"	Yogaraj Bhat	Udit Narayan, Sowmya Raoh	4:20
4.	"Hosa Gaana Bajana"	Yogaraj Bhat	Puneeth Rajkumar, Suvi Suresh	3:44
5.	"Dum Dhool Bajare"	V. Nagendra Prasad	Karthik, Nanditha	5:04
6.	"Ready Ready"	M. Lohit	M. L. R. Karthikeyan	4:36

== Reception ==
=== Critical response ===
R G Vijayasarathy of Rediff.com scored the film at 3 out of 5 stars and says "Priyamani, who makes her Kannada debut through this film, plays a perfect foil to Puneet in the dance scenes. She looks charming in the film. There is nothing special in Hari Krishna's songs, except for Hosa Gaana Bajaana and Neenendhare Nanage Ishta. Krishna Kumar's camera work is okay". B S Srivani from Deccan Herald wrote "The first half of the film is entertaining but begins running in circles soon after. Krishnakumar’s cinematography and the competitive spirit of Priyamani (who sometimes resembles a serious Jyothika) all make ‘Raam’ work. Never mind a small niggling problem. The story doesn’t register or connect easily, thanks to the pace. True film buffs make no distinction of language and will definitely enjoy ‘Raam’, who rams the viewer hard, leaving behind only two of Harikrishna’s tunes". A critic from The Times of India scored the film at 3 out of 5 stars and says "It is a treat to watch Puneeth's brilliance in dialogue delivery and expressions. Priyamani makes a grand debut in Sandalwood with a lively performance. Rangayana Raghu is the cream of the team. Srinath, Arun Sagar, Sharath Lohithashwa, Doddanna, and Sundararaj excel. Music by V Harikrishna is melodious. Krishna Kumar's camerawork is brilliant". A critic from Bangalore Mirror wrote "There are the mandatory two good songs and four good fights. And missing is the hamming of Rangayana Raghu (this is a plus point). The rest of the cast have fixed roles. Raam is worth a watch if you can forgive the dull moments that arrive early on".

== Release ==
The movie opening was not good compared to previous Puneeth's films but picked up after three days. The movie had massive houseful boards in Bangalore, Mysore, Davangere and Bellary. It completed 25 weeks.
