= Vegam (2007 film) =

- Directed by: K. R. Udayasankar
- Written by: G. K. Gopinath (dialogues)
- Screenplay by: S. Ve. Sekhar
- Produced by: V. Sekhar, Uma Maheswari
- Starring: Ashwin Shekhar; Veda; Prabhu; Khushbu Sundar; Sriman
- Cinematography: K. R. Selvaraj
- Music by: Rajhesh Vaidhya
- Production company: Commercial Creations
- Release date: 28 September 2007
- Country: India
- Language: Tamil

Vegam (/veɪɡəm/ transl. Speed) is a 2007 Indian Tamil-language action thriller film directed by K. R. Udhayashankar and starring Ashwin Shekhar and Veda. It is an unofficial remake of the American film Cellular. It was remade again in Tamil as Nayagan.

== Plot ==
The movie revolves around Ashwin (Ashwin Shekar) who runs an event management company, and romances Archana (Veda). Aswin comes to Malaysia to meet her. He comes across a telephone call from a woman, who cries out for help.

A former cop Sriman kidnaps a housewife Selvi (Khushboo) and her son and asks for a tape. Selvi does not know anything about the tape Sriman is asking about. To ensure that Selvi does not make any outside contacts from his place, he breaks the receiver of the telephone. Selvi somehow repairs it and dials an anonymous number which is answered by Aswin and Selvi pleads with him to save her life, and her sons. Aswin takes the conversation as light initially but later on when the calls keep repeating, he realises the issue and sets in search of Selvi to rescue her.

He eventually acquired the assistance of a local cop, Kumaravel (Prabhu) in his quest.

How did Aswin rescue Selvi and her son from Sriman and his gang is the rest of the story. This story is a remake from the Hollywood movie, "Cellular", starring Chris Evans, Kim Basinger and Jason Statham.

== Cast ==
- Ashwin Shekhar as Ashwin
- Veda as Archana
- Prabhu as Kumaravel, ASP, Malaysia Police
- Khushbu Sundar as Selvi
- Sriman as Cop
- Lollu Sabha Jeeva as Ashwin's friend
- Mohan Vaidya as Ashwin's father
- S. Ve. Shekhar as cameo appearance
- Venu Aravind
- Crane Manohar
- Sridhar

== Production ==
The film marked the acting debut of Ashwin Sekhar, son of actor S. Ve. Sekhar. The second half of the film was shot in Malaysia.

== Soundtrack ==
Veena exponent Rajhesh Vaidhya made his debut as composer with this film. The names of the lyricists are not mentioned in soundtrack. Rediff wrote "Truly a compelling contemporary musical passage laced with melodic richness". Ashwin and his sister Anuradha performed a song each in the album. The soundtrack was released under the label "Big Music".

- "Aarumugam" — Rajesh Vaidya
- "Kalathara" – P. Unnikrishnan, Anuradha Sekhar
- "Silirkudhe" — Anuradha Sekhar
- "Kya Bole" — Tippu, Harini
- "Vegam" — Ranjith, Haricharan

== Reception ==
Malini Mannath of Chennai Online wrote "What follows is straight from 'Cellular', an almost faithful reproduction, with even some of the lines and the placement of scenes unabashedly borrowed from the English film. [..] What works in the film's favour is that it attractively captures the scenic spots of Malaysia, and has a running time of just about two hours". Gopika of Kalki panned the acting of lead pair but appreciated the acting of other cast, praised Vaidya's score, Selvaraj's cinematography, Gopinath's dialogues and Prakash's fights as both negative and positive and noted the director who moved the film quickly but did not move it wisely and the film gets messed and stumbles. Rediff wrote, "One ferverently wished SVe Shekher had opted for a low-budgeted comedy instead of this pseudo-thriller to launch his son".
