= Sarvam Sakthimayam =

- Directed by: P. R. Somasundar
- Starring: Rajesh; Sudha Chandran; S. Ve. Shekher; Manorama; Radha Ravi; Ramya Krishnan
- Music by: Ben Surender
- Production company: Preeth Indar Combines
- Release date: 7 March 1986
- Country: India
- Language: Tamil

Sarvam Sakthimayam is a 1986 Indian Tamil-language devotional film directed by PR Somasundhar under the Preethi Inder Combines banner. It stars Rajesh and Sudha Chandran in lead roles, with S. Ve. Shekher, Manorama, Radha Ravi, and Ramya Krishnan in supporting roles. The film was released on 7 March 1986.

== Plot ==
K. Natraj (Rajesh) is an orphaned but successful architect who lives with his aunt and cousin. One day in the temple, he chances upon Sivakami (Sudha Chandran), a very pious girl who is very much devoted to the Mother Goddess. Natraj falls for her and eventually expresses his wish to marry her. She doubted that he will marry her at first because she lost one leg in an accident. They eventually tie the knot.

However, Natraj's aunt Rajamma and her son, his cousin Balu do not like Sivakami and often look down on her because of her handicap. Their hatred for her increases even more when Natraj entrusts the key of the money safe to her. Balu is in a habit of visiting Bhama, a temptress who, along with her "uncle", Alavanda (Radha Ravi), often swindles money from Balu. When Sivakami gets pregnant, Balu and his mother spike her drinks with a drug to try and abort the baby, fearing that Sivakami may control the money once the baby is born. They twice succeed in aborting the baby. Natraj and Sivakami do not know of their plot. They are greatly saddened by losing their children but accept it as fate. One day when they were going out. Sivakami notices a temple tower in a distance. After some inquiry, they find out that it is an old temple, known as "Kolakara Kaliamman Kovil" meaning temple of killer Goddess, named so because of many mysterious murders that has been happening in that temple for the past ten years. One of the murders were shown in the beginning of the movie, where a married couple takes shelter in the temple during rain and the husband is lying dead under the trident of the Goddess the next morning, and the wife dies along with husband while mourning for him. Many other murders happened similarly. Nobody went to the temple after that.

Sivakami wanted to go to the temple, and they enter the temple, which was very dilapidated. She was mesmerized by the temple deity, the Goddess Kali. She cleaned the temple premises and, along with her husband, worshiped the Goddess and asked Her to grant them a baby, promising that they will perform penance and renovate the temple in return. One day Rajamma makes Sivakami grind rice to make a "Maavilakku" (a special lamp made of flour, used for worship of the Goddess), despite knowing that she is handicapped, and goes to the temple with the flour for the vilakku without Sivakami, also knowing that Sivakami goes to the temple every Friday. Unhappy that she was not able to see the maavilakku ceremony, she prays to the Mother Goddess to forgive her. The Goddess (Ramya Krishnan) appears in front of her house in the guise of a lady, gives her some flour as blessing and leaves the house.

After that, things start happening to the advantage of Sivakami through the grace of the Goddess. She gets pregnant again and this time Rajamma and Balu's efforts were in vain to abort the baby. Eventually Sivakami gives birth to a beautiful baby girl. Since young, the girl, named Devi, has behaved in many ways like the Mother Goddess. Rajamma and Balu try to kill Devi many times, but she kills all the assassins hired by Balu, including one who is revealed to have committed all the mysterious murders associated with the Kali temple. This assassin's killing is a dramatic one where the Goddess herself kills him. He lies dead under the trident of the Goddess Kali, similar to all the murders that has been done by him.

"Nalvaakku" Nagamma (Manorama), is a woman who pretends to talk to the Mother Goddess by trunk calls through a lime phone, trying to solve people's problems by taking money from them as call bills, and earns a living though that. Raju(S. Ve. Shekher), comes to her asking for help to identify what his father wanted to tell him before he died. Using his father's words, Manorama gets him married to her daughter, a fat Renuka. These scenes provide comic relief.

As per their prayer, Sivakami and Natraj renovate the old Kali temple and in this festival, the Goddess reforms Rajamma by burning her Saree and then saving her by making the women fit a Veppillai (Neem) robe around her. Balu took his mother's new behavior as the last straw and hires some poachers to release a leopard to kill Devi. But the leopard envisions Devi as the Mother Goddess and becomes tamed by Devi. It then bites Balu, causing him to lose his right leg. Balu also discovers that Bhama was a cheater and that Alavanda was her boyfriend in the guise of an old man. He confronts them but gets beaten up in return. Cheated and depressed, Balu reforms himself. Only his sister-in-law, Sivakami actually cared for him and he begins to respect her.

One day, Devi gets bitten by a snake and the doctors say that she may not recover. Sivakami goes to the Kali temple and prays for her daughter's life. Devi comes to life, much to the family's happiness. Sivakami asks Devi to go to the Goddess and thank her. Devi goes and merges with the idol of Kali. A divine light appears and then the Goddess reveals that she had incarnated as Sivakami's daughter to restore righteousness. She blesses all of them and disappears.

== Cast ==
- Rajesh
- Sudha Chandran
- Ramya Krishnan
- Y. Vijaya
- S. Ve. Sekhar
- Bindu Ghosh
- Manorama
- Vinoth
- Babitha
- Radha Ravi
- Baby Kalpana

== Production ==
The scene where goddess takes form of a leopard by rescuing the child from villains was shot at Talakona near Tirupati.

== Soundtrack ==
Six songs were composed for this film by Ben Surender, amongst other small tracks.

Track listing
No.	Title	Singer(s)	Length
1.	"Sangeetha Sowbhagyame"	P. Susheela
2.	"Vanthene"	S. P. Sailaja
3.	"Arul Mazhai Pozhiyum"	P. Susheela
4.	"Devi Sri Devi"	P. Susheela
5.	"Sarvam Sakthimayam"	Vani Jairam, T. S. Raghavendra
6.	"Mahakali"	Vani Jairam
