= Oru Sandesam Koodi =

- Poster
- Directed by: Cochin Haneefa
- Written by: Cochin Haneefa
- Screenplay by: Cochin Haneefa
- Produced by: R. S. Sreenivasan
- Starring: Mammootty; Prem Nazir; Rohini; Cochin Haneefa
- Cinematography: Vipin Das
- Edited by: K. Sankunni
- Music by: Shyam
- Production company: Sree Sai Productions
- Distributed by: Sree Sai Productions
- Release date: 9 May 1985
- Country: India
- Language: Malayalam

Oru Sandesam Koodi is a 1985 Indian Malayalam-language film, directed by Cochin Haneefa and produced by R. S. Sreenivasan. The film stars Mammootty, Prem Nazir, Rohini and Cochin Haneefa. It is a remake of Tamil film Kudumbam Oru Kadambam. The musical score is by Shyam.

== Plot ==
Vijayan, Prasad and Gopi are shown living in a rental home. They struggle to pay the rent. On one occasion the owner tries to evict them, but they are not willing to leave.

Vijayan is a drunk and a local rowdy. His mother, younger brother Raju and sister Rama live with him. Vijayan is not willing to get a job, and does nothing for his family. He drinks and starts fights in the market. His younger brother, Raju, is like him, but has an interest in politics. Their sister Rama is an SSLC student. Their mother is the only source of income. She becomes a servant in some neighbors' homes.

== Cast ==
- Mammootty as Vijayan
- Jagathy Sreekumar as Raju
- Rohini as Rama
- Kamala Kamesh as Lakshmiyamma
- Cochin Haneefa as Chandran
- Shankar Panikkar as Gopy
- Kunchan as Kadara Kunjunni
- Unnimary as Rajani
- Jose as Unnikrishnan
- Ragini as Shari
- Nedumudi Venu as Prasad
- Bahadoor as Rajashekharan Nair
- Paravoor Bharathan as House Owner
- Prem Nazir as Cameo Appearance

== Soundtrack ==
The music was composed by Shyam with lyrics by R. K. Damodaran.

No.	Song	Singers	Lyrics	Length (m:ss)
1	"Fit alla Ammachiyaane"	K. J. Yesudas	R. K. Damodaran	
2	"Maatam Oru Sandesham"	K. J. Yesudas, Chorus	R. K. Damodaran	
3	"Oraayiram"	S. Janaki, P. Jayachandran	R. K. Damodaran	
4	"Paadum Vaanambadikal"	K. S. Chithra	R. K. Damodaran	
