= Manal Kayiru 2 =

2016 Indian film by Madhan Kumar

- Theatrical release poster
- Directed by: Madhan Kumar
- Written by: Madhan Kumar (dialogues)
- Screenplay by: S. Ve. Shekhar
- Story by: S. Ve. Shekhar
- Produced by: Murali Ramaswamy
- Starring: S. Ve. Shekhar; Jayashree; Ashwin Shekhar; Poorna; Visu; Jagan
- Cinematography: Gopi
- Edited by: Athiyappan Siva
- Music by: Dharan Kumar
- Production company: Sri Thenandal Films
- Distributed by: Sri Thenandal Films
- Release date: 23 December 2016
- Running time: 140 minutes
- Country: India
- Language: Tamil

Manal Kayiru 2 (transl. Sand Rope 2) is a 2016 Indian Tamil-language comedy drama film directed by Madhan Kumar, starring S. Ve. Shekher, Jayashree, Ashwin Shekhar and Poorna. The film is a sequel to the 1982 film, Manal Kayiru and Shekher, Visu, and Kuriakose Ranga reprise their roles from the original. The film received negative reviews and was a box-office bomb. This is Visu's last film before his death.

== Plot ==
Kittumani is a rich and successful businessman living with his wife, Uma, and teenage daughter, Nisha. Nardhar Naidu has become a successful marriage matchmaker in the past 30 years. Kittumani has a grudge against Nardhar Naidu for arranged his marriage to Uma 30 years ago, when she did not fulfill none of the 8 preconditions he had asked for in his wife-to-be. Kittumani has decided to get his daughter married and has begun to search for a groom. But Nisha also, like her father, has 8 conditions to be fulfilled by her fiancé, such as

- He should not have parents or relatives, and he should be an orphan.
- He should be a graduate and unemployed.
- He should know how to swim.
- He should not have an interest in movies and politics.
- He should not get angry at any situation, even if she slaps him, and he should not have the habit of drinking.
- After marriage, she and her husband should not have kids, as she is very fond of pets.
- He should allow her to be social and should not doubt her sociality.
- He should sign the divorce papers before marriage.

Uma again meets Naradhar Naidu and informs him about her daughter's condition. Naradhar Naidu decides to help Uma once again. He finds a suitable match in Arjun, an MBA graduate, an ad film model, and Uma's brother, Lakshamanasamy's son.

== Cast ==
- S. Ve. Shekhar as Kittumani
- Ashwin Shekhar as Arjun
- Poorna as Nisha
- Visu as Naradhar Naidu
- Reshma Pasupuleti as Chandra
- Jayashree as Uma Kittumani
- Swaminathan as Broker Swaminathan
- Chaams as Santhakumar
- Jagan
- Delhi Ganesh as Doctor
- M. S. Bhaskar as Astrologer
- Kuriakose Ranga as Lakshmanaswamy
- Namo Narayana as Arivu
- Sonia as TV Host
- Lollu Sabha Manohar
- George Vijay as George
- Suraj Raja as Roshan
- Bharathi
- Caroline
- Bala Guru
- Dharan Kumar in a cameo appearance

== Soundtrack ==
The soundtrack was composed by Dharan.

Track listing
| No. | Title | Singer(s) | Length |
|---|---|---|---|
| 1. | "Adiye Thangamatene" | Anirudh Ravichander | 3:42 |
| 2. | "Mudhal Mazhai" (instrumental) | – | 4:32 |
| 3. | "Rajathi Rajan" | Suchitra, Ashwin Shekar | 3:37 |
| 4. | "Mudhal Mazhai" | Shakthisree Gopalan, Naresh Iyer | 4:32 |
| 5. | "Roller Coaster" | Mukesh Mohamed, M. M. Manasi, Dr. Narayanan, S. Kousihan | 4:21 |
| 6. | "Kittumani" (theme) | – | 0:33 |
| Total length: | | | 21:17 |

== Critical reception ==
Deccan Chronicle wrote, "On the whole, it is enjoyable most of the time." The Hindu opined, "It’s quite clear that if Manal Kayiru 2 were made into a play, it would mean repeating this flaccid attempt at humour hundreds of times." The Times of India stated, "Manal Kayiru 2 lacks innovativeness in the plot, and the unconvincing characterisations rub salt in the wound." Sify said, "Among the other actors, SV Shekar, Visu, Lollu Sabha Swaminathan and Chams steal the show because they are the ones who make us sit through such a badly made film." Maalai Malar gave a mixed review.
