= Aa Naluguru =

2004 Telugu-language film

- DVD cover
- Directed by: Chandra Siddhartha
- Written by: Madan (story / dialogues)
- Screenplay by: Chandra Siddhartha; Madan
- Produced by: Sarita Patra; P. Prem Kumar (Presents)
- Starring: Rajendra Prasad; Aamani
- Cinematography: T. Surendra Reddy
- Edited by: Girish Lokesh
- Music by: R. P. Patnaik
- Production company: Prem Movies
- Release date: 9 December 2004
- Running time: 140 mins
- Country: India
- Language: Telugu

Aa Naluguru (transl. Those four people) is a 2004 Indian Telugu-language drama film directed by Chandra Siddhartha. The film stars Rajendra Prasad and Aamani with music composed by R. P. Patnaik. It is produced by Sarita Patra and presented by P. Prem Kumar. The film won three Nandi Awards. The film was later remade in Kannada in 2006 as Sirivantha.

== Plot ==
In his afterlife, Raghuram converses with messengers of death and expresses a desire to observe his own funeral. He anticipates that his family and well-wishers would be in grief over his unexpected demise, but is astonished to witness their apathy. Expressing his anguish and profound concern over their obsession with money, he narrates his past to the messengers.

In a flashback, Raghuram works as a newspaper editor, living with his wife, Bharathi, and their three children: Shekar, Chinna, and Indira. A staunch altruist, Raghuram consistently puts others first and frequently gives away portions of his earnings to those in need, much to the frustration of his family. His close friend, Subramanyam, repeatedly advises him against his excessive idealism, but to no avail. Raghuram even risks his life to rescue Mastan, a Muslim man, from a religious strife, earning his family's deep admiration. Meanwhile, Kotaiah, a cynical loanshark, frequently urges him to renounce his principles and agree that money is superior to humanity. After the newspaper's managing director, G. Venkat Rao, pressures Raghuram to publish tabloid pictures of actresses to increase circulation, Raghuram refuses to compromise with his morals and resigns. However, Rao recognizes his virtue and urges him to rejoin, promising no interference in his work.

Meanwhile, Raghuram discovers Indira's relationship with a man named Ravi and whole-heartedly arranges for their marriage. Shekar qualifies for the post of Sub-inspector but faces a bribe demand to secure the position. Simultaneously, Chinna scores poorly on engineering entrance examinations and asks his father to pay a huge sum of capitation fee to secure a seat for him in an engineering college. While Kotaiah and Subramanyam resort to the transaction for their sons, Raghuram refuses and urges Chinna to earn a seat on merit. Further, Indira and Ravi wish to settle in the United States and demand funds from Raghuram. Though he does not yield, his children's constant pressure and Bharathi's resentment deeply trouble Raghuram. The latter is profoundly disappointed after his sons use unethical means to secure their goals.

Desperate to satisfy his family, Raghuram ultimately accepts defeat to Kotaiah and takes massive loans from Kotaiah, Venkat Rao, and Mastan to fulfill his children's financial demands. Distraught by his compromised morals, Raghuram dies in his sleep.

In the present, a large crowd gathers for Raghuram's funeral, but his sons and Ravi are absent. Through the messengers of death, Raghuram discovers that they are hiding to evade debtors and escape with the money after the funeral. Meanwhile, when doctors arrive to harvest Raghuram's donated eyes, they find a suicide note disclosing that he took his own life. Shocked, Subramanyam conceals the note to preserve Raghuram's dignity, though Bharathi realizes the truth and collapses in remorse over her family's selfishness.

As those whom Raghuram helped throughout his life arrive to pay their final respects, the funeral attracts extensive media coverage and turns into a grand procession. En route to the airport, Raghuram's sons and Ravi inadvertently run into the crowd and are forced to participate. At the cremation ground, Kotaiah disrupts the rites and demands immediate repayment of the loans. Shekar refuses to take the responsibility and steps away, prompting the grieving public to pool their money to repay Kotaiah. However, Kotaiah reveals that his disruption was a ploy to expose the children's ingratitude and that he had secretly wanted Raghuram's ideals to triumph. Ashamed, Raghuram's children repent their actions. But as Shekar attempts to light the pyre, Bharathi intervenes, publicly disowns her children, and implores the people Raghuram aided to perform his final rites and help him attain salvation.

Content, Raghuram finds peace and begins to see the messengers of death as deities. They explain that his previous grief had blinded him to their true form, and they lead his soul towards heaven.

== Cast ==
- Rajendra Prasad as Raghuram
- Aamani as Bharati
- Kota Srinivasa Rao as Kotaiah
- Subhalekha Sudhakar as Subramanyam
- Raja as Shekar, Raghuram's elder son
- Chalapathi Rao as Messenger of god
- Raghu Babu as Messenger of god
- Suthi Velu as Mallayya, Office Peon
- Prem Kumar Patra as G. Venkat Rao, proprietor of newspaper
- Giridhar as Suri, Kotaiah's son
- Ping pong Surya as Chinna, Raghuram's younger son
- Revathi as Indira, Raghuram's daughter
- Junior Relangi as astrologer
- Jenny
- Annapurna as Raghuram's mother
- Rajitha as Subramanyam's wife
- Apoorva as Kotaiah's wife

== Music ==
Aa Naluguru

Film score by R. P. Patnaik
- Released: 2004
- Genre: Soundtrack
- Length: 27:02
- Label: Unknown
- Producer: R. P. Patnaik

R. P. Patnaik chronology
Appudappudu (2003)	Aa Naluguru (2004)	Aunanna Kadanna (2005)

Music was composed by R. P. Patnaik. Lyrics were written by Chaitanya Prasad. Music released on Aditya Music Company.

No.	Title	Singer(s)	Length
1.	"Inko Rojochindandi"	S. P. Balasubrahmanyam, Balaji	5:04
2.	"Gundepai Thannuthoo"	S. P. Balasubrahmanyam, R.P.Patnaik, Usha	5:13
3.	"Okkadai Ravadam"	S. P. Balasubrahmanyam	3:10
4.	"Naluguroo Mechinaa"	S. P. Balasubrahmanyam	3:25
5.	"Good Morning"	Instrumental	5:00
6.	"Wish You Happy Married Life"	Instrumental	5:10
Total length:			27:02

== Awards ==
Nandi Awards - 2004

- Best Feature Film - Gold - Sarita Patra
- Best Actor - Rajendra Prasad
- Best Character Actor - Kota Srinivasa Rao
