= Keezh Vaanam Sivakkum =

- Theatrical release poster
- Directed by: Muktha Srinivasan
- Screenplay by: Visu
- Story by: Kuriakose Ranga
- Produced by: S. Ravi
- Starring: Sivaji Ganesan; Saritha; Jaishankar; Sarath Babu; Menaka
- Cinematography: M. Karnan
- Edited by: V. P. Krishnan; R. Shanmugam
- Music by: M. S. Viswanathan
- Production company: Vidhya Movies
- Release date: 26 October 1981
- Country: India
- Language: Tamil

Keezh Vaanam Sivakkum (transl. The eastern sky will turn red) is a 1981 Indian Tamil-language film, directed by Muktha Srinivasan and produced by S. Ravi. The film stars Sivaji Ganesan, Saritha, Jaishankar, Sarath Babu and Menaka. It is based on a play of the same name by Kuriakose Ranga. The film was released on 26 October 1981 and became a box-office hit, running for over 100 days in theaters. It won the Tamil Nadu State Film Award for Second Best Film. The film was remade in Telugu as Gopala Krishnudu and in Malayalam as Chakravalam Chuvannappol.

== Plot ==
Dr. Dwarakanath is a renowned ophthalmologist in Coimbatore, devoted to God and with a high moral standing. He shares his happy home with his son Srivathsan (a sales rep who spends most of his time in other cities), daughter-in-law Manju, a couple of relatives and a faithful servant. Dwarakanath is nurturing the secret that Manju is afflicted with a dreadful disease and has only a few months to live.

Senthil, a blind man, shows up at Dwarakanath's house, and demands him to restore his vision. Dwarakanath learns that Senthil intends to kill the man who was responsible for his sister Gayathri's suicide. The only proof he has is a photograph of the man took with his sister in Ooty. Dwarakanath promises to keep the photo safe and restore Senthil's vision soon.

Dwarakanath sees the photo and that sends him shockwaves. He immediately rips it into 2, keeps one half, and rips the other into multiple pieces and tosses into a trash can. Manju, who is watching all this, secretly retrieves the pieces, puts them together, finds out the studio details and goes there to get the negative. But the photo studio guy says someone already took it just the previous day. Based on the studio guy's information, Manju deduces it was Dwarakanath who took the negative.

Manju taunts Dwarakanath about the photograph, but he dodges her, while secretly grieving about her medical situation. Manju makes multiple copies of Gayathri's photo that she assembled, tears them again, and asks all the men she knows to put them together. To her surprise, all the men in the house seem to know Gayathri. Upon further investigation, Manju finds out Dwarakanath made them say that just to confuse her.

Meanwhile, Srivathsan gets a copy of Gayathri's photo and reminisces the past. It it revealed that he had an affair with a women in Ooty. Gayathri works as the woman's maid. Srivathsan poses as the woman's nephew and pretends to love Gayathri and seduces her. Gayathri finds out she has been cheated and kills herself.

Srivathsan figures out by accident that Manju is dying. He berates Dwarakanath for hiding this from him. But Dwarakanath hits back at Srivathsan about cheating Gayathri and causing her death. Srivatsan also learns about Senthil and tactfully cancels his eye surgery.

Manju finally succumbs to her disease. Dwarakanath uses her eyes and restores Senthil's vision. He hands him the envelope with Gayathri's photo with Srivatsan, but tells him Manju would have been shattered if she saw the photo. Senthil does not want Manju's eyes to see the photo and pardons his sister's lover to honor Manju and Dwarakanath. He rips the envelope and leaves the house, leaving others grieving for Manju.

== Cast ==
- Sivaji Ganesan as Dr. Dwarakanath
- Saritha as Manju
- Jaishankar as Senthil / Kumaran
- Sarath Babu as Srivathsan
- Menaka as Gayathri
- Y. G. Mahendran
- Vennira Aadai Moorthy
- Kathadi Ramamurthy
- Manorama as the maid
- Major Sundarrajan as Dr. Sankaran
- C. I. D. Sakunthala

== Production ==
Keezh Vaanam Sivakkum was an adaptation of the stage play of the same name by Kuriakose Ranga. Visu wrote the screenplay for the film adaptation. Both Visu and Ranga expressed interest to Muktha Srinivasan to adapt the play into a film and wanted Sivaji Ganesan to play the protagonist, he was eventually chosen. Srinivasan initially wanted Sangili Murugan to portray Jaishankar's character; since Murugan was busy with other commitments, he could not act in the film. The makers also initially wanted to cast Prabhu for Sarath Babu's character which they later dropped.

== Soundtrack ==
The music was composed by M. S. Viswanathan, with lyrics by Kannadasan. The song "Kadavul Ninaithan" became hugely popular.

Song	Singers	Length
"Enakkoru Vedivelli"	M. S. Viswanathan	06:05
"Kan Kanda Deivame"	T. M. Soundararajan, P. Susheela	04:48
"Ponnana Ulagam"	S. P. Balasubrahmanyam, S. P. Sailaja	04:28
"Kadavul Ninaithan"	T. M. Soundararajan	04:31

== Release and reception ==
Keezh Vaanam Sivakkum was released on 26 October 1981, Diwali day. Despite facing competition from other Diwali releases such as Andha 7 Naatkal and Tik Tik Tik, it became a box office success, running for over 100 days in theatres. S. Shivakumar of Mid-Day appreciated the acting performances of Ganesan and Saritha, along with the former's "impeccable" dialogue delivery. Nalini Sastry of Kalki praised Saritha for dominating Ganesan with her performance, called Kannadasan's lyrics as meaningful and also praised humour for evoking laughter.
