= Evare Athagadu =

- Film poster
- Directed by: P. Bhanu Shankar
- Written by: Marudhuri Raja (Dialogues)
- Screenplay by: P. Bhanu Shankar
- Story by: Balabhadrapatruni Ramani
- Produced by: Gemini Kiran
- Starring: Vallabha; Priyamani; Jaya Seal
- Cinematography: R. Ramesh Babu
- Edited by: Marthand K. Venkatesh
- Music by: M. M. Keeravani
- Distributed by: Anandi Arts
- Release date: 11 January 2003
- Country: India
- Language: Telugu

Evare Athagadu is a 2003 Indian Telugu-language film directed by P. Bhanu Shankar and starring Vallabha, Priyamani, Jaya Sheel, and K. Viswanath. This was the debut film for both Priyamani and Vallabha, the son of Telugu film producer, K. S. Rama Rao. The film's story is based on an unreleased novel by Balabhadrapatruni Ramani.

== Plot ==
Sunny (Vallabha) and Sneha (Jaya Seal) are childhood friends. When Sunny joins Sneha's event management company, he falls in love with her. In a flashback narration, Sneha reveals the sad experiences of her life.

As time passes, Sneha begins to fall in love with Sunny but is hesitant to tell him. Meanwhile, Sunny leaves for the United States, where he meets Rekha (Priyamani) and proposes to her. Sneha is shocked to see Sunny engaged to Rekha upon his return but agrees to be the event manager for his wedding. Sunny soon realizes Sneha's love for him.

== Cast ==
- Vallabha as Sunny
- Priyamani as Rekha
- Jaya Seal as Sneha
- K. Viswanath as Rekha's grandfather
- Tanikella Bharani
- Ahuti Prasad
- Dharmavarapu Subramanyam
- Brahmanandam
- L. B. Sriram
- Mallikarjuna Rao
- Sunil
- Chitram Srinu
- Duvvasi Mohan
- Subbaraya Sharma
- Delhi Rajeswari
- Sana
- Ramya Sri
- Apoorva
- Suman Setty
- Gundu Hanumantha Rao

== Production ==
The film's muhurat shot took place on 24 August 2002. This is the second film of P. Bhanu Shankar, whose first film was the unreleased Manamiddaram featuring Venu.

== Soundtrack ==
Evare Athagadu

Soundtrack album by M. M. Keeravani
- Released: 2003
- Recorded: 2002
- Genre: Feature film soundtrack
- Length: 34:45
- Label: Aditya Music
- Producer: M. M. Keeravani

M. M. Keeravani chronology
Yuva Rathna (2002)	Evare Athagadu (2003)	Ee Abbai Chala Manchodu (2003)

Soundtrack was composed by M. M. Keeravani and released on Aditya Music.

All tracks are written by Veturi.

Track-List
No.	Title	Singer(s)	Length
1.	"Prema Yenthha Goppadi"	K. K., Ganga Sitharasu	5:07
2.	"Setaramula Kalyanam"	M. M. Keeravani	5:09
3.	"Nathicharami"	S. P. Balasubrahmanyam, K. S. Chithra	5:11
4.	"Ee Jagame Oka Aakasam"	S. P. B. Charan	5:01
5.	"Evaramma Athagadu"	S. P. B. Charan, Sri Vardhini	4:33
6.	"Pelli Kodaka"	Sri Vardhini, Karthik	5:08
7.	"Vana Vana"	Tippu, Kalpana	4:36
Total length:			34:45

== Reception ==
A critic from The Hindu praised the performances of the cast and added that "The film is technically strong both in Keeravani's music score and Rameshbabu's photography".
