= Hemashree =

Indian actress

- Born: Hemashree Hosahalli Nagaraju; 1982; Tumkur, Karnataka, India
- Died: 9 October 2012 (aged 29–30); Bangalore, India
- Occupation: Actress
- Years active: 2001–2012
- Political party: Bahujan Samaj Party
- Spouse: R. Surendra Babu (m. 2011)

Hemashree Hosahalli Nagaraju (1982 – 9 October 2012) was an Indian actress who worked in Kannada television soap operas. She had also appeared in a handful of Kannada films in supporting roles. At the 2008 Karnataka Legislative Assembly elections, she contested with a Bahujan Samaj Party (BSP) ticket for her home town Chikkanayakana Halli in the Tumkur region of Karnataka. She died of mysterious circumstances in October 2012, and her husband Surendra Babu was alleged to have murdered her.

== Career ==
Hemashree made her debut as an actress in 2001, as a 19-year-old, in a Kannada television soap opera. She trained at the Adarsha Film and T. V. Institute, Bangalore. In the following years, she worked in soaps such as Danda Pindagalu, Saahasa Lakshmiyaru and others made by S. Narayan. She appeared in minor roles in films, Varsha and Sirivantha (2006).

== Personal life ==
Hemashree was married to R. Surendra Babu, an advocate and a realtor, on 22 June 2011. She was coerced to marry him by her mother, who ha received a dowry of ₹50 lakh from Babu, who was 48 at the time. The followed day, she registered a complaint with the Bangalore City Police over the matter and sought police protection fearing that Babu could harm her. It was also revealed that her "allegedly greedy family" forced her into politics. The couple lived in the Banashankari neighbourhood of Bangalore.

== Partial filmography ==
Movies
Year	Title
2002	Appu
2002	Marma
2005	Varsha
2006	Sirivantha
2008	Ugragami
2009	Cinema Alla Real Story
2010	Veera Parampare

TV shows
Year	Title	Ref.
Unknown	Danda Pindagalu	
2002	Daridra Lakshmiyaru	
Unknown	Mahamayi	
Unknown	Tulasi	
2004	Uttarayana	
Unknown	Vatara	
2006-2007	Geethanjali	
2011-12	Manasu Mamatha	
