= S. Ve. Shekher =

Indian playwright, actor and politician

Member of the Tamil Nadu Legislative Assembly
- In office 11 May 2006 – 13 May 2011
- Preceded by: K. N. Lakshmanan
- Succeeded by: R. Rajalakshmi
- Constituency: Mylapore

Personal details
- Born: Sattanathapuram Venkataraman Sekher; 26 December 1950 (age 75)
- Party: Dravida Munnetra Kazhagam
- Other political affiliations: AIADMK, Indian National Congress, Bharatiya Janata Party
- Spouse: Uma
- Children: Anuradha; Ashwin

Sattanathapuram Venkataraman Shekher (born 26 December 1950) is an Indian actor, film director, screenwriter, politician and a Tamil-language playwright. In 2006, he was elected as an MLA for the All India Anna Dravida Munnetra Kazhagam (AIADMK) from Mylapore. He is the founder of Federation of Brahmin associations of South India (FEBAS).

== Personal life ==
Shekher was born in a family to Sattanathapuram Venkataraman on 26 December 1950. He completed his diploma in Mechanical Engineering and post diploma in Air Conditioning and Refrigeration.

Shekher is married to Uma, who is the granddaughter of G. Ramanathan, a renowned Tamil film music director during 1950s. The couple have a daughter named Anuradha and a son named Ashwin who debuted in the Tamil movie Vegam.

== Career ==
Shekher's stage career began in 1974 when he acted in his first stage play. He entered Kollywood as a still photographer for the film Mogham. Then, was spotted by director K. Balachander who provided him a role in the film Ninaithale Inikkum and later gave him a full-fledged role in his movie Varumayin Niram Sivappu.

Back in 1973, having been inspired by his journey, when part of the Singapore drama team and also part of a popular drama team by the name 'Mylapore Boys' which were in stiff competition with the Crazy troupe, led by Crazy Mohan, went on to start his troupe, Natakhapriya, that has staged about 24 plays. His drama troupe went on to perform around the globe; Europe, UAE, Singapore, Malaysia, United States of America and South America. He went on to feature in the Limca book of Records for having produced plays throughout the day, right from the morning, 7:47 A.M until the next morning, 1.49 A.M, which accounted for eight plays altogether, in the month of April, the year 1985. His play Adhirshtakaaran went on to be directed and produced into a film, Krishna Krishna, with him playing the lead himself. Shekhar did not just curtail himself to acting and performing but went on to write as well. He has released 32 books to date that contain his story and dialogue of all his stage plays. These books also include his jokes, his views; and answers to social topics put forth to him by his fans, which caused him to once again be mentioned in the Limca Book of Records. Shekhar went on to receive a doctorate for his Theatrical and Social services by the American Tamil University. Today he stands as one of those legendary playwrights who stand along with the members of drama troupes in the United States of America. After all the hard work he invested in his passion for theater, he went on to bag the 'Iyal Isai Nataka Mandram's Kalai Maamani Award' and the 'Best Drama Troupe' Award. Shekhar also won the Best All India Programme producer award for four consecutive years from the Radio and Television Advertisers and Producers Association – RAPA. He has not been acclaimed to be the 'Best Comedian' by just the Mylapore Academy, but also by celebrities such as Kamal Haasan, Rajinikanth and A. P. J. Abdul Kalam. He was also acclaimed to be the same by Wisdom magazine. Shekhar has also bagged the award of Tamil Nadu's prestigious Kalaivanar Award.

In 2015, S. Ve. Shekher got appointed as one of the members of Central Board of Film Certification.

== Politics ==
In 2006, he made an entry into politics by contesting and winning the Legislative Assembly Elections as an All India Anna Dravida Munnetra Kazhagam (AIADMK) candidate from Mylapore. He was expelled from AIADMK on 30 July 2009. He later joined the Indian National Congress. He was expelled from the Congress party for working against the party's interests. He joined the Bharatiya Janata Party in 2013 and quit the party in 2024.

He founded the Federation of Brahmin Associations of South India on 2009. He is currently with Dravida Munnetra Kazhagam. He is famous for jumping to different political parties and also supporting whoever is having popularity.

=== Accusations on journalists which led to protests ===
S Ve Shekher shared a post on Facebook in April 2018 which allegedly accused all women journalists in Tamil Nadu of sleeping around with the top bosses to get their jobs, when a female journalist complained against Banwarilal Purohit for patting her cheek at a press conference. The cyber-crime wing of the police filed a case under 'section 4' of the Tamil Nadu Prohibition of Women Harassment on the basis of a complaint from the journalists association.

A large number of journalists protested outside the BJP office, urging that the party to take action against Shekher. Later, a small number of journalists went to Shekhar's house and proceeded to protest, some were also arrested for throwing stones at his house. Various political leaders and journalists condemned his statements.

In May 2018, the High Court of Madras denied him anticipatory bail. The police had, however, stayed away from detaining Shekher, and even after the high court had refused the bail. He has been spotted in different functions with police security. He was later granted bail in June 2018.

=== 2020 Case for controversial speech ===
On 3 August 2020, a complaint was registered against Shekher of trying to incite communal violence by making provocative statements in his Youtube channel, insulting the Indian national flag by giving it religious association and spreading misinformation against Chief minister Edappadi K. Palaniswami. This caused social condemnations with police complaint to be registered. In the video he criticized the Chief minister for opposing the three-language policy and for seeking action against those who draped saffron cloth on AIADMK founder M. G. Ramachandran. Chief Minister Palaniswami responded by saying that the ADMK party have no obligation to respond to his comments and he goes into hiding if a case if filed against him. The Central Crime Branch booked him under the National Honour Act of 1971. In September 2020, he was forced to apologize to the court unconditionally to consider for the police to not arrest.

== Plays ==
Number	Drama	Notes
1	Avan Oru Thani Maram	
2	Kannamoochi	
3	Thirumbi Vandha Manaivi	
4	Crazy Thieves in Palavakkam	
5	Oru Sonda Veedu Vadagai Veedagirathu/Tenant Commandments	
6	One More Excorcist	
7	Mahabharathathil Mangaathaa	
8	Sathal Illayel Kaadhal	
9	Kaadhula Poo	
10	Kaattula Mazhai	
11	1000 Udhai Vaangiya Aboorva Sigamani	
12	Vaal Paiyan	
13	Ellame Thamashthan	
14	Ellarum Vaanga	
15	Athirshtakkaaran	
16	Yaamirukka Bhayam Yean?	
17	Periya Thambi	
18	Chinna Maapley Periya Maapley/Honeymoon in Hyderabad	
19	Eppavum Nee Raja	
20	Thathu Pillai	
21	Alwaah	
22	Periyappa	
23	Kuzhandhaisaamy	
24	Mega Vasool	
25	Jodi Porutham	As actor and is directed by T. V. Varadarajan, presented by United Visuals troupe.
26	Idhu Ambalainga Samacharam	
27	Inimay Nangathan	
28	Sirippu Ungal Choice	
29	Taxi Taxi	
30	Vanna Kolangal	
31	Modhi Vilaiyadu Paapa	

== Filmography ==
=== Actor ===
==== Films ====
Year	Film	Role	Notes
1979	Ninaithale Inikkum	Radio operator	Uncredited role
1979	Andamaina Anubhavam	Radio operator	Telugu film; uncredited role
1980	Varumayin Niram Sivappu	Thambu	
1981	Aakali Rajyam	Thambu	Telugu film
1981	Sumai	Anal Agnihotri	
1981	Pattam Parakattum	Kaathadi Kannan	
1981	Kudumbam Oru Kadambam	Paramasivam	
1982	Payanangal Mudivathillai	Pichumani	
1982	Thambathyam Oru Sangeetham	Madhoo	
1982	Simla Special	Bujji Babu	
1982	Manal Kayiru	Kittumani	
1982	Sparisam	Appalachari	
1982	Marumagale Vaazhga	Vaathu Varathachari	
1982	Gopurangal Saivathillai	Stanley Sadagopan	
1982	Adhisayappiravigal	Nallamuthu	
1983	Uruvangal Maralam	A unemployed	
1983	Dowry Kalyanam	Mangupathi	
1983	Seerum Singangal	Aadu Annamalai	
1983	Subhamuhurtham	Subbarayan	
1983	Brahmacharigal	Appalachari	
1983	Oru Pullanguzhal Aduppudhugiradhu	Mohammed Mudhaliar	
1983	Thoongatha Kannindru Ondru	Unni Kosthepu	
1984	Oorukku Upadesam	Paramu Raman	
1984	Thiruttu Rajakkal		
1984	Vengayin Maindhan	Beggar	
1984	Raja Veettu Kannukkutty	Yaagapuri Eeyunni Gopalakrishna ha	
1984	Naanayam Illatha Naanayam	Deivasigamani "Sigamani"	
1984	Maaman Machaan	Dr. Mahesh	
1984	Thanga Koppai	Siva	
1984	Dhinamthorum Deepavali	Kuzhandhai	
1984	Pei Veedu	Saatha	
1985	Naam	Shekher	
1985	Poove Poochooda Vaa	David Pillai	
1985	Panam Pathum Seiyum	Shekhar	
1985	Chidambara Rahasiyam	Chidambaram	
1986	Mr. Bharath	Ashok	
1986	Lakshmi Vandhachu	Naai Shekhar	
1986	Soru	Parathaman	
1986	Cinema Cinema	Ravi	
1986	Jigujigu Rail		
1986	Maruthi	Subramanium	
1986	Sarvam Sakthimayam	Kadappa Raju	
1986	Kodai Mazhai	Shekhar	
1986	Piranthaen Valarnthaen	Suresh	
1986	Adutha Veedu	Raju I.A.S.	
1987	Thirumathi Oru Vegumathi	Ballaraman	
1987	Enga Veetu Ramayanam	Pushpa Purushan	
1988	Veedu Manaivi Makkal	Sigamani	
1988	Katha Nayagan	Ramani	
1988	Manaivi Oru Mandhiri		
1988	Sahadevan Mahadevan	Mahadevan	
1989	Thangamani Rangamani	Thangamani	
1989	Thangamana Purushan	Saravana	
1989	Manandhal Mahadevan	Mahadevan	
1989	Thaaya Thaarama	Balu	
1990	Avathellam Pennalae	Sivaramakrishnan	
1990	Vedikkai En Vadikkai	Paambuthanni	
1991	Veetla Eli Veliyila Puli	Rama	
1991	Pondatti Pondattithan	PSBB Rajagopalan	
1994	Pondattiye Deivam	Murukku Pattabi	
1998	Jeans	Vellaiappan	
1998	Kalyana Galatta	Velu	
1998	Guru Paarvai	Police Inspector	Guest appearance
1999	Thirupathi Ezhumalai Venkatesa	Ezhumalai	
2000	Kandha Kadamba Kathir Vela	Kadamba	
2001	Krishna Krishna	Krishna	Also director, also lyrics for song "Thalli Vechu", also singer for song "Naan Orakannal"
2001	Sigamani Ramamani	Sigamani	
2002	Kamarasu	Dancer	Special appearance
2004	Kadhal Dot Com	Priya's uncle	
2004	Arasatchi	Lara's father	
2005	Jithan	Priya's father	
2006	Vallavan	Suchitra and Bala's father	
2007	Vegam		also story and screenplay
2009	Enga Raasi Nalla Raasi	Sivashankara Baba	
2014	Ninaivil Nindraval	Nethaji Subash Chandrabose	also screenplay
2016	Manal Kayiru 2	Kittumani	also story and screenplay
2018	Traffic Ramasamy	Judge	

==== Television ====
Year	Title	Role	Channel	Notes
1980s	Vannathirai		DD Tamil	
2000	AVM-in Galatta Sirippu		Sun TV	
2025	Meenakshi Sundaram	Sundaram	Kalaignar TV	

=== Dubbing artist ===
Year	Film	Actor	Notes
1980	Moodu Pani	Mohan	
