= Priyamani =

Indian actress (born 1984)

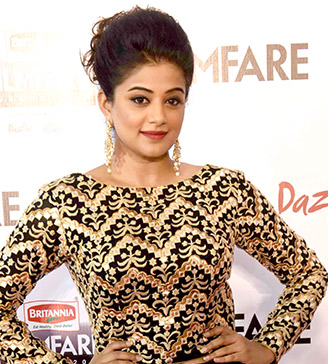
- Priyamani in 2015
- Born: Priyamani Vasudeva Iyer; 4 June 1984 (age 42); Bangalore, Karnataka, India
- Other name: Priyamani Raj
- Education: Bishop Cotton Women's Christian College
- Occupation: Actress
- Years active: 2003–present
- Spouse: Mustafa Raj (m. 2017)

Priyamani Raj (née Iyer; born 4 June 1984), known mononymously as Priyamani, is an Indian actress who works in Telugu, Kannada, Tamil, Malayalam, and Hindi films. She is the recipient of a National Film Award, three Filmfare Awards South and a Tamil Nadu State Film Award.

Priyamani began her career with the 2003 Telugu film Evare Atagaadu. She went on to star in Raam (2009), Puthiya Mukham (2009), Raavanan (2010), and Pranchiyettan & the Saint (2010). She gained praise for playing a strong female lead in Madurai pastures in the Tamil romantic drama Paruthiveeran (2007), which won her the National Film Award for Best Actress and the Filmfare Award for Best Actress – Tamil. She also won the Filmfare Award for Best Actress – Malayalam for Thirakkatha (2008) and the Filmfare Award for Best Actress – Kannada for Chaarulatha (2012). She has since starred in Idolle Ramayana (2016), Jawan (2023), Article 370 (2024), and Officer on Duty (2025).

== Early life ==
Priyamani was born and raised in Bangalore, Karnataka, to a Tamil Palakkad Iyer family. Her father, Vasudeva Iyer, owns a plantation business, and her mother, former national-level badminton player Lathamani Iyer, was a bank manager at Union Bank of India.

Priyamani modelled for Kanchipuram Silk, Erode Bharani Silks, and Lakshmi Silks during her school years. When she was in the 12th standard, Tamil film director Bharathiraja introduced her to the film industry. While at school, she actively participated in extracurricular activities and in sports. She is the granddaughter of Carnatic vocalist Kamala Kailas. She is the cousin of film actress Vidya Balan and the niece of playback singer Malgudi Shubha.

Priyamani studied at Sri Aurobindo Memorial School, Bengaluru. After completing her schooling, she modelled for print advertisements. She then completed her pre-university course and the degree from Bishop Cotton Women’s Christian College, Bengaluru. Beside her native Tamil, She can also speak fluently in English, Malayalam, Kannada, Telugu, and Hindi. Film director Fazil had approached her for acting in a movie, and she rejected the offer prior to her board examinations and eventually made her film debut in a Tamil film.

== Career ==
Priyamani made her debut with Telugu film, Evare Atagaadu. Although she began her acting career with Bharathiraja's Tamil film, Kangalal Kaidhu Sei, it was Evare Atagaadu which was released first.

Priyamani then made her debut in Malayalam cinema with Sathyam. Then she was signed by Tamil film director and cinematographer Balu Mahendra to act in the 2005 drama Adhu Oru Kana Kaalam. Before release, Babith said "Priyamani has come up with an excellent performance in the movie. Adhu Oru Kana Kaalam was critically acclaimed but failed at the box office. In 2006, Priyamani starred in the Telugu film Pellaina Kothalo. The film was a hit and got her three Telugu films.

Priyamani managed to prove her acting credentials and commercial appeal with 2007's Paruthiveeran, directed by Ameer, in which she was co-starred with debutant Karthi. A rural subject which told the story of a notorious young villager in Madurai, the film won critical acclaim and became a surprise box-office blockbuster. She went on to win the National Film Award, followed by South Filmfare Award, Tamil Nadu State Film Award and an award at the Osian's Cinefan Festival of Asian and Arab Cinema.

She had another commercially successful film in Telugu, in the 2007 film Yamadonga and in the Tamil film Malaikottai. She again received critical acclaim in 2008 for her role in the Malayalam film Thirakkatha, in which she played a role based on the turbulent real-life story of late film actress Srividya. She won another Filmfare Award for her performance. In Tamil, she had a single release in 2008: Thotta.

In 2009 she had two Tamil releases, the masala film Arumugam and the remake of the Malayalam blockbuster Classmates, titled Ninaithale Inikkum. The former was a commercial failure: Her Kannada debut film Raam was also a commercial success. All three of her Telugu releases that year, however, (Drona, Mitrudu, Pravarakhyudu) did not do well at the box office. In 2010 she acted in the satirical film Pranchiyettan & the Saint which became the longest-running Malayalam film since 2005. She won a Filmfare nomination for her role as a Mumbai-based interior decorator in the film.

She was subsequently signed by director Mani Ratnam for his bilingual film, titled Raavanan and Raavan in Tamil and Hindi respectively. Soon after, she was hired by Bollywood director-producer Ram Gopal Varma for his bilingual film Rakht Charitra. Varma decided to cast her after seeing her National Award-winning performance in Paruthiveeran. Her Kannada film Vishnuvardhana became a blockbuster hit and later she starred in Anna Bond. Although the film was poorly received by critics and featured on Rediff's "Most Disappointing Kannada Films of 2012" list, it went on to become a successful venture at the box office. She appeared in an item number in the Bollywood film Chennai Express. She has completed shooting for a Malayalam film, The True Story and the Telugu film, Chandi, in which she plays Ganga the granddaughter of a freedom fighter, who seeks revenge for the problems her family had to face. She was cast opposite Darshan in the Kannada film Ambareesha in (2014). In 2014, she posed for a PETA ad campaign, asking the public to boycott zoos that feature caged tigers. In 2024, she was cast in the Hindi film Article 370

Besides The Family Man, Priyamani was also in ZEE5's His Storyy, Narappa, and Virata Parvam.

== Personal life ==
Priyamani announced her engagement to Mustafa Raj, an event organiser, in 2016, and the couple married in Bengaluru in 2017. Priyamani is Hindu, while her husband is a Muslim; she has spoken about receiving negative text messages and online comments due to their interfaith marriage.

== Filmography ==
Key
†	Denotes films that have not yet been released

=== Films ===
Year	Title	Role	Language	Notes	Ref.
2003	Evare Atagaadu	Rekha	Telugu	credited as Priya	
2004	Kangalal Kaidhu Sei	Vidhya	Tamil		
2004	Sathyam	Sona	Malayalam		
2005	Adhu Oru Kana Kaalam	Thulasi	Tamil		
2005	Otta Nanayam	Reshma	Malayalam		
2006	Pellaina Kothalo	Lakshmi	Telugu		
2006	Madhu	Mercy	Tamil		
2007	Paruthiveeran	Muthazhagu	Tamil		
2007	Toss	Naina	Telugu		
2007	Yamadonga	Maheswari	Telugu		
2007	Nava Vasantham	Anjali	Telugu		
2007	Malaikottai	Malar	Tamil		
2008	Thotta	Nalina	Tamil		
2008	Thirakkatha	Malavika	Malayalam		
2008	Hare Ram	Anjali	Telugu		
2008	King	Dancer	Telugu	Special appearance in the song "Nuvvu Ready Nenu Ready"	
2009	Drona	Indhu	Telugu		
2009	Mitrudu	Indu	Telugu		
2009	Puthiya Mukham	Anjana	Malayalam		
2009	Arumugam	Yamini	Tamil		
2009	Ninaithale Inikkum	Meera	Tamil		
2009	Pravarakhyudu	Sailaja	Telugu		
2009	Raam	Pooja	Kannada		
2010	Shambo Shiva Shambo	Muniamma	Telugu		
2010	Sadhyam	Suhani	Telugu		
2010	Golimaar	Pavithra	Telugu		
2010	Raavan	Jamuni	Hindi	Simultaneously shot in Hindi and Tamil	
2010	Raavanan	Vennila	Tamil	Simultaneously shot in Hindi and Tamil	
2010	Pranchiyettan and the Saint	Padmashree	Malayalam		
2010	Eno Onthara	Madhumathi	Kannada		
2010	Rakht Charitra II	Bhavani	Hindi; Telugu	Bilingual film (also partially reshot in Tamil)	
2010	Ragada	Priya / Ashtalakshmi	Telugu		
2011	Raaj	Mythili	Telugu		
2011	Kshetram	Naga Penchalamma / Sohini Aggarwal	Telugu		
2011	Vishnuvardhana	Meera	Kannada		
2012	Ko Ko	Cauvery	Kannada		
2012	Anna Bond	Meera	Kannada		
2012	Grandmaster	Deepthi	Malayalam		
2012	Chaarulatha	Chaaru and Latha	Kannada; Tamil	Bilingual film	
2013	Lakshmi	Priya	Kannada		
2013	Chennai Express	Dancer	Hindi	Special appearance in the song "1-2-3-4 Get on the Dance Floor"	
2013	Chandi	Ganga / Chandi	Telugu		
2014	Alice: A True Story	Alice / Uma	Malayalam		
2014	Njangalude Veettile Athidhikal	Bhavana	Malayalam		
2014	Ambareesha	Smitha	Kannada		
2015	Ranna	Dancer	Kannada	Special appearance in the song "What to do"	
2016	Kathe Chitrakathe Nirdeshana Puttanna	Geethanjali	Kannada		
2016	Kalpana 2	Kalpana	Kannada		
2016	Dana Kayonu	Jagadhamba (Jhummi)	Kannada		
2016	Idolle Ramayana	Susheela	Kannada	Bilingual film	
2016	Mana Oori Ramayanam	Susheela	Telugu	Bilingual film	
2017	Chowka	Mariea D Souza	Kannada		
2018	Dhwaja	Ramya	Kannada		
2018	Ashiq Vanna Divasam	Shyni	Malayalam		
2019	Pathinettam Padi	Gowri Vasudev	Malayalam	Cameo appearance	
2019	Nanna Prakara	Dr. Amrutha	Kannada		
2020	Ateet	Janvi	Hindi	ZEE5 film	
2021	Naarappa	Sundaramma	Telugu	Amazon Prime film	
2022	Bhamakalapam	Anupama Mohan	Telugu	Aha film	
2022	Virata Parvam	Comrade Bharatakka	Telugu		
2022	Salaam Venky	Adv. Nanda Kumar	Hindi	Cameo appearance	
2022	Dr. 56	Priya Krishna	Kannada	Bilingual film	
2022	Dr. 56	Priya Krishnan	Tamil	Bilingual film	
2023	Custody	Chief Minister Dakshayani	Telugu; Tamil	Bilingual film	
2023	Jawan	Lakshmi	Hindi	Partially reshot in Tamil	
2023	Neru	Poornima Rajasekhar	Malayalam		
2024	Bhamakalapam 2	Anupama Mohan	Telugu		
2024	Article 370	Rajeshwari Swaminathan	Hindi		
2024	Maidaan	Saira Rahim	Hindi		
2024	Quotation Gang	Shakuntala	Tamil		
2025	Officer on Duty	Geetha Hari	Malayalam		
2026	S Saraswathi	Lakshmi	Telugu		
2026	Jana Nayagan	Sheila Rani	Tamil		
2026	G.D.N	Chellammal	Tamil		
2026	Blind Game	Yamini	Hindi		
2027	Golmaal 5 †	TBA	Hindi	Filming	
2027	Ram †	TBA	Malayalam	Filming	

=== Television ===
==== Web series ====
List of web series performances
Year	Title	Role	Language	Network	Notes
2019–present	The Family Man	Suchitra Tiwari	Hindi	Amazon Prime Video	
2021	His Story	Sakshi	Hindi	Alt Balaji, ZEE5	
2023	Sarvam Shakthi Mayam	Priya	Hindi	ZEE5	
2025	Good Wife	Tarunika Gunaseelan	Tamil	JioHotstar	

==== As a host or judge ====
Year	Program	Language	Channel	Notes
2014	D 4 Dance	Malayalam	Mazhavil Manorama	
2015	D 2 – D 4 Dance	Malayalam	Mazhavil Manorama	
2015	Dancing Star 2	Kannada	ETV Kannada	
2016	Dancing Star Juniors	Kannada	ETV Kannada	
2016	Kings of Dance	Tamil	Star Vijay	
2016	D 3 – D 4 Dance	Malayalam	Mazhavil Manorama	Asiavision Television Award for Best Celebrity Judge
2016	Dancing Star 3	Kannada	Colors Kannada	
2017	D4 Junior Vs Seniors	Malayalam	Mazhavil Manorama	
2017	Dance Jodi Dance 2	Tamil	Zee Tamil	
2017	Dhee 10	Telugu	ETV Telugu	
2018–2019	Dhee 11	Telugu	ETV Telugu	
2018–2019	Dance Kerala Dance	Malayalam	Zee Keralam	
2019	Teas Best Partner	Malayalam	Mazhavil Manorama	
2019	Kerala Dance League	Malayalam	Amrita TV	Celebrity judge
2019	D5 Junior	Malayalam	Mazhavil Manorama	Grand finale jury
2019	Famously Filmfare	Malayalam; Kannada	MX Player	Host
2019–2020	Comedy Stars	Malayalam	Asianet	Recurring Judge
2019–2020	Comedy Stars Weekend Challenge	Malayalam	Asianet	
2019–2020	Dance Jodi Dance 3.0	Tamil	Zee Tamizh	
2020	Dhee Champions	Telugu	ETV Telugu	
2021	Dhee 13	Telugu	ETV Telugu	
2022	Dhee 14 Dancing Icon	Telugu	ETV Telugu	

=== Short films ===
Year	Title	Role	Language	Channel	Notes
2017	Hand of God	Eleena	Malayalam	Mazhavil Manorama	
2019	White	Blind lady	English	YouTube	
2025	The Promise	Chitra	Hindi	YouTube	

== Awards and nominations ==
Priyamani awards and nominations
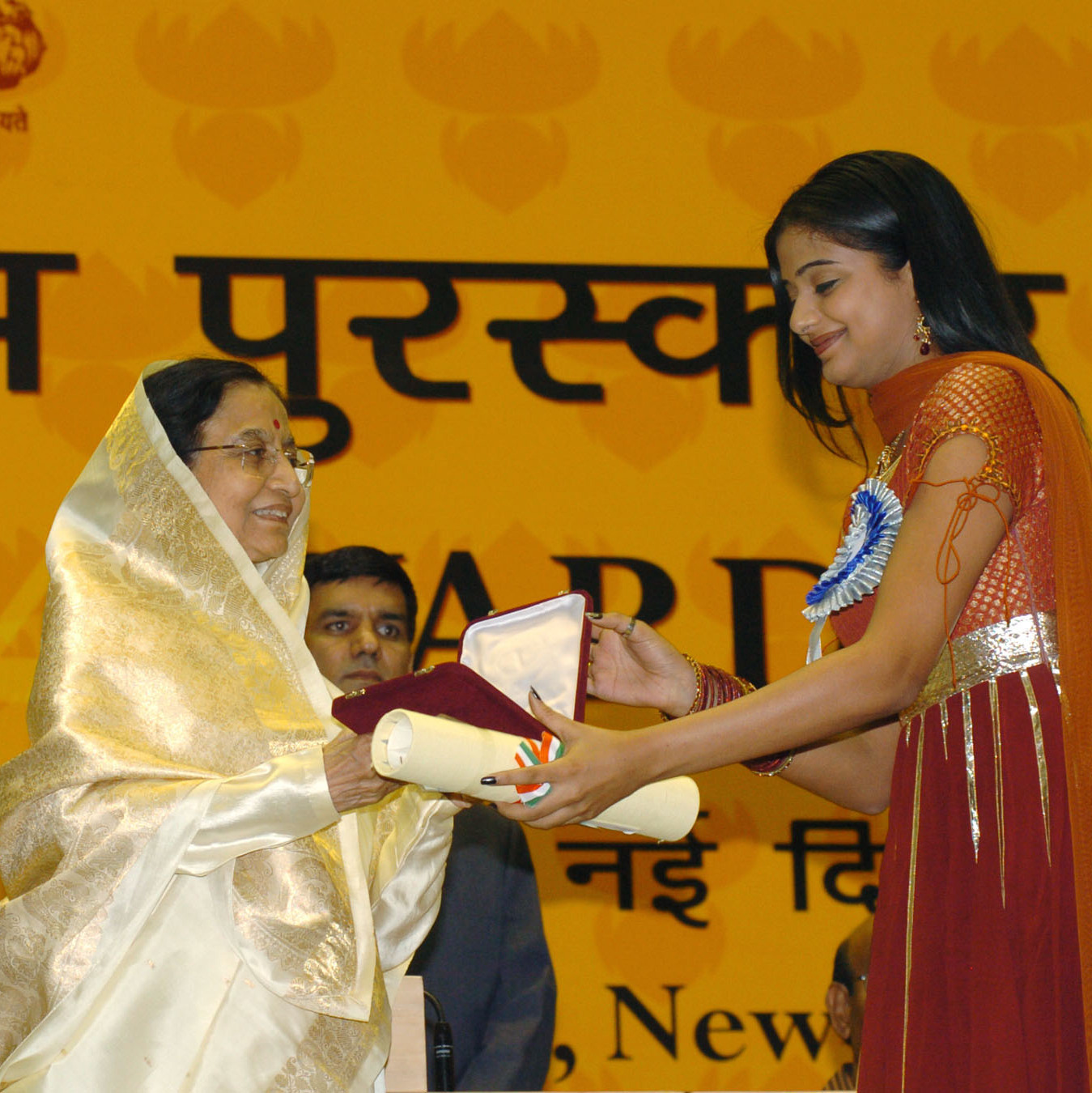
- The President, Smt. Pratibha Devisingh Patil presenting the Best Actress Award to Priyamani at the 54th National Film Awards function, in New Delhi on 2 September 2008.
Awards and nominations
Award	Wins	Nominations

Totals (Note: Certain award groups do not simply award one winner. They acknowledge several different recipients, have runners-up, and have third place. Since this is a specific recognition and is different from losing an award, runner-up mentions are considered wins in this award tally. For simplification and to avoid errors, each award in this list has been presumed to have had a prior nomination.)
- Wins: 10
- Nominations: 17

Year	Award Category	Language	Work / film	Result	Ref.
2007	National Film Award for Best Actress	Tamil	Paruthiveeran	Won	
2007	Tamil Nadu State Film Award for Best Actress	Tamil	Paruthiveeran	Won	
2007	Filmfare Award for Best Actress – Tamil	Tamil	Paruthiveeran	Won	
2007	Vijay Award for Best Actress	Tamil	Paruthiveeran	Won	
2008	Filmfare Award for Best Actress – Malayalam	Malayalam	Thirakkatha	Won	
2009	Filmfare Award for Best Actress – Kannada	Kannada	Raam	Nominated	
2011	Filmfare Award for Best Actress – Malayalam	Malayalam	Pranchiyettan and the Saint	Nominated	
2012	Filmfare Award for Best Actress – Kannada	Kannada	Chaarulatha	Won	
2012	Suvarna Film Award for Best Actress	Kannada	Chaarulatha	Won	
2012	SIIMA Award for Best Actress – Kannada	Kannada	Chaarulatha	Won	
2016	Filmfare Award for Best Supporting Actress – Telugu	Telugu	Mana Oori Ramayanam	Nominated	
2017	Kalaimamani Awards	Tamil	Contribution to Tamil Cinema	Won	
2020	Filmfare OTT Awards for Best Actor Series (Female) : Drama	Hindi	The Family Man	Nominated	
2020	Filmfare OTT Awards Best Actor, Drama Series (Female) – Critics Choice	Hindi	The Family Man	Won	
2022	SIIMA Award for Best Actress - Telugu	Telugu	Narappa	Nominated	
2023	SIIMA Award for Best Supporting Actress - Telugu	Telugu	Virata Parvam	Nominated	
2023	Filmfare Award for Best Supporting Actress – Telugu	Telugu	Virata Parvam	Nominated	
2025	IIFA Award for Best Supporting Actress	Hindi	Article 370	Nominated	
2025	Filmfare Award for Best Supporting Actress	Hindi	Article 370	Nominated	
