= Ashwin Shekhar =

Indian actor working in Tamil cinema

- Occupation: Actor
- Years active: 2007-2016
- Spouse: Shruthi Venkatraman

Ashwin Shekhar is a former Indian actor working in Tamil cinema. He is the son of actor-politician S. Ve. Sekhar.

== Personal life ==
Ashwin got engaged to Shruti Venkatraman at the Convention Centre at GRT on Chennai on 8 May 2011. Shruthi is the daughter of Congress member Madangi Venkatraman of Gobichettipalayam, Erode.

== Filmography ==
Year	Film	Role	Notes
2007	Vegam	Ashwin	
2014	Ninaivil Nindraval	Ramana	
2016	Manal Kayiru 2	Arjun	
