= Pravarakhyudu =

- Wallpaper
- Directed by: Madan
- Written by: Madan
- Produced by: Ganesh Indukuri
- Starring: Jagapati Babu; Priyamani
- Cinematography: T. Surendra Reddy
- Edited by: M. R. Varma
- Music by: M. M. Keeravani
- Production company: Tolly 2 Holly films
- Release date: 4 December 2009
- Running time: 158 minutes
- Country: India
- Language: Telugu

Pravarakhyudu is a 2009 Indian Telugu-language romance film written and directed by Madan. The film stars Jagapati Babu and Priyamani. The music was composed by M. M. Keeravani. The film released on 4 December 2009.

== Plot ==
The film begins with Sasi Kumar, an eminent zoology professor from Harvard, returning from abroad after several years. Forthwith, he pays attention to his nuptial and goes on bride-hunting. However, he dislikes them, reminds his one-time sweetheart Sailaja, and moves rearward to their college days. Sailaja is a meritorious student who has faith in tradition, love, and romance with conceit. In those days, Sasi had a strange mindset and failed to feel emotion. He views the world as versatile, which confuses Sailaja, but later, she comprehends the reality and loves Sasi. At that point, Sasi states that she is vacillating on infatuation as he firmly believes men and women are only for sexual interaction. Hearing it, Sailaja loathes with salvos and quits Sasi's life.

Presently, Sailaja is a lofty, adamant, headstrong principal of a women's college who constrains new methods of her own. Sasi seeks one chance to have a confab, which she turns down. Hence, he pulls strings and designates himself as a lecturer at Sailaja's college and a tenant at home. From there, many girls, including lecturers, are lured by his charm, which envies Sailaja. After a series of donnybrooks, Sasi makes meteoritic changes, boosts the girls' fortitude, and clarifies that Sailaja's system is rubbish. Moreover, he summits the organization to international standards. Accordingly, Sasi and Sailaja, with three students, proceed to South Africa, where the teenagers lust him. Anyhow, Sasi stands firm and transforms them when Sailaja understands his righteousness.

Soon after returning, Sailaja walks to express her acceptance when she overhears Sasi approaching her after considering manifold matches when her ego hurts. So, she goes forth to college to resign and leave the town. Sasi, who is behind her, slaps her and divulges to her about his past. Indeed, he is a neglected child by his parents, who also performed a love marriage that used always to wrangle, split for some time, and reunited. Plus, he never receives his motherly affection as she is beauty-conscious and neglects him even in an ailing state. Thus, Sasi affirms that all human relations are for necessity only. Later, he regrets being aware that his mother is the one who saved him from danger. Forthwith, his heart bloomed with love and rushed for her. Right now, he presents his appeal before Sailaja and marches on. The whole campus listens to the conversation and pleads with her to accept. At last, Sailaja gives her approval, which delights everyone. The movie ends on a happy note with the marriage of Sasi & Sailaja.

== Cast ==
- Jagapati Babu as Sasi Kumar
- Priyamani as Sailaja
- Brahmanandam as Lecturer
- Sunil as Ravi
- Ali as Cycle
- Hamsa Nandini as Jyotirmayi
- Rajya Lakshmi as Sailaja's mother
- Radha Kumari
- Rashmi Gautam
- Dharmavarapu Subramanyam as Lecturer
- Chalapathi Rao
- AVS
- C. V. L. Narasimha Rao as Sailaja's father
- Noel Sean
- Ravi Varma
- Samrat Reddy
- Chalaki Chanti
- Madhu Sharma
- Pooja
- Anithanath
- Monica
- Sonam
- Ramya
- Rajani Iyer
- Vasavi
- Lirisha

== Production ==
A sequence involving a lion was shot in South Africa.

== Soundtrack ==
Pravarakhyudu

Film score by M.M. Keeravani
- Released: 2009
- Genre: Soundtrack
- Length: 23:28
- Label: Aditya Music
- Producer: M.M. Keeravani

M.M. Keeravani chronology
| Magadheera (2009) | Pravarakhyudu (2009) | Rama Rama Krishna Krishna (2010) |

Music was composed by M.M. Keeravani and released by Aditya Music company. Lyrics were written by Chaitanya Prasad. The audio was released on 8 November 2009 at the Taj Banjara hotel in Hyderabad with S. S. Rajamouli, Srinu Vaitla, Dil Raju, Varun Sandesh, Krishnudu, and Raja Ravindra in attendance.

| No. | Title | Singer(s) | Length |
|---|---|---|---|
| 1. | "Gaalamesi Pattina Chepa" | Ranjith, Bhargavi Pillai | 4:56 |
| 2. | "Neela Neelimabbu" | Sunitha | 4:18 |
| 3. | "Emaipoyano" | Anuj Gurwara, Sivani | 4:10 |
| 4. | "Cool Be Cool" | Hemachandra, Geetha Madhuri | 5:25 |
| 5. | "Bangaram" | M. M. Keeravani, Geetha Madhuri | 4:24 |

== Reception ==
Jeevi of Idlebrain.com rated the film 2.75 out of 5 and wrote, "Despite of the above mentioned flaws, Pravarakhyudu still offers something for family crowds". Radhika Rajamani of Rediff.com rated the film 2.5 out of 5 and wrote, "Overall, the film is a decent entertainer with a message for the youth".
