= Varsha (film) =

- DVD cover
- Directed by: S. Narayan
- Written by: S. Narayan (dialogues)
- Screenplay by: S. Narayan
- Story by: Siddique - Lal
- Based on: Hitler by Siddique
- Produced by: Rockline Venkatesh
- Starring: Vishnuvardhan; Ramesh Aravind; Manya; Komal; Doddanna; Hemashree
- Cinematography: P. K. H. Das
- Edited by: P. R. Soundar Raj
- Music by: S. A. Rajkumar
- Production company: Rockline Productions
- Release date: 22 April 2005
- Running time: 153 minutes
- Country: India
- Language: Kannada

Varsha is a 2005 Indian Kannada-language comedy-drama film written and directed by S. Narayan, produced by Rockline Venkatesh under the banner of Rockline Productions. It stars Vishnuvardhan in the lead role with Ramesh Aravind, Anu Prabhakar and Manya in supporting roles. The film is the remake of the 1996 blockbuster Malayalam-language film Hitler. The story centers around the life of Satyamurthy (Vishnuvardhan), known for his tough character, domineering personality, and uncontrolled rage at the youngsters of the area, for stalking his five young sisters. The film features songs composed by S. A. Rajkumar. The film was a blockbuster, running for 200 days in multiple centers across Karnataka, thus becoming the highest-grossing Kannada film of the year.

== Plot ==
Sathya has come up in life the hard way, as he lost his mother when he was a small boy, and his father was framed and arrested on criminal charges. Sathya, unaware of his father's innocence, takes custody of his five young sisters. Sathya's father, Bhadra, was cheated by his brother-in-law, who poisoned his sister's mind to leave her husband, but she committed suicide later, and her son Sathya is left with his five sisters. Sathya takes care of his sisters well and educates them, but they are under his strict control, and anyone who plays foul with them faces his wrath. He finds himself in trouble because of this tough character. Meanwhile, Sathya's father is released from prison and now wants to take revenge on his brother-in-law, but the latter joins hands with some villains who want to settle scores with Bhadra and his son. They hatch a plan to create a rift in Sathya's family, which, surprisingly, everyone succeeds in. Will Sathya reunite with his family again and prove his father's innocence?

== Cast ==
- Vishnuvardhan as Satyamurthy alias Satya (Hitler)
- Ramesh Aravind as Ravi
- Manya as Veena
- Anu Prabhakar as Roopa, Sathya's second sister and Ravi's wife
- Komal
- Doddanna
- Srinivasa Murthy as Satya and sisters' father
- Shobaraj
- Ramesh Bhat as Professor Shankar
- Lakshman Rao
- Kazan Khan
- Ashok as LIC Vishwanath
- Master Chandan
- Sunil Raoh
- Mandeep Roy
- Mandya Jayaram
- Nanda Kishore
- Sarika Raje Urs
- K. V. Manjayya
- Pramila Joshai
- Sindhu Chethan
- Roopa
- Asharani
- Padmini Prakash
- Shwetha Chengappa as Gayathri
- Tennis Krishna
- M. N. Lakshmi Devi
- Hemashree
- Master Goutham

== Soundtrack ==
Varsha

Soundtrack album by S. A. Rajkumar
- Released: 24 March 2005
- Genre: Feature film soundtrack
- Length: 28:25
- Label: Jhankar Music

S. A. Rajkumar composed the film's background score and music for its soundtrack, with the lyrics written by S. Narayan. The soundtrack album consists of six tracks. The song "Thanana Thanana" is based on "Kila Kila Navve" from the Telugu film Suryavamsam.

Track listing
No.	Title	Singer(s)	Length
1.	"Goli Maaro"	Mathangi Jagdish	4:33
2.	"Ikku Maga"	S. A. Rajkumar	4:08
3.	"Kanneerige Kanneerenu"	S. P. Balasubrahmanyam, Chithra	4:55
4.	"Idenidu Badukina Vesha"	S. P. Balasubrahmanyam	4:56
5.	"Thananana Thananana"	Hariharan, Shreya Ghoshal	4:45
6.	"Vaasanthi Vaasanthi"	Hariharan, Shreya Ghoshal	5:08
Total length:			28:25

== Reception ==
Rediff wrote, "Both Vishnuvardhan and S Narayan had huge hits like Aaptha Mithra and Mourya respectively to their credit before they came together for Varsha. Thankfully, Varsha does not belie the expectations it had raised. The film has everything in the right proportion -- emotions, comedy and action. And the product is supported well by its technicians and cast". S. N. Deepak of Deccan Herald wrote "The story moves smoothly in the first half with comedy episodes and later sentiments and action scenes take over the second half. Vishnu as the “elder brother” suits his role. Ditto for Anu Prabhakar. Srinivasamurthy, Komal and Doddanna steal the show. Sunil’s character though a small one, brings the lead characters together in the climax."
