= Silambarasan filmography =

Filmography of the Indian actor

Silambarasan (born 3 February 1983) is an Indian actor, director, singer and television celebrity who works in Tamil cinema. He began his career playing minor roles as a child artist in films produced by his father, T. Rajendar. His debut, as a lead actor, was in Kadhal Azhivathillai (2002), which was produced and directed by his father.

His second film Dum (2003), a remake of the 2002 Kannada film Appu, fared well commercially. In the same year he appeared in Alai, a box office failure. Silambarasan had three releases in 2004. The first was Kovil, which deals with the relationship between a Hindu boy and a Christian girl. Silambarasan was praised by Malathi Rangarajan of The Hindu for acting with "restraint and maturity". It was a box office success. Silambarasan appeared next in Kuthu, a remake of the Telugu film Dil. The film received unfavourable reviews but had a successful theatrical run. His final release in 2004 was Manmadhan, which he also wrote. The film was a major success, and propelled Silambarasan to stardom. The following year, he had only one release: Thotti Jaya, in which he plays an orphaned gangster who finds love. In 2006, Silambarasan had two releases: Saravana (directed by K. S. Ravikumar) and Vallavan which he helped write and directed himself. The film was a box office success. He starred in two films in 2008: the action-masala films Kaalai and Silambattam. Neither received positive reviews, but the latter was profitable.

Silambarasan's sole release in 2010 as a lead actor was the romance Vinnaithaandi Varuvaayaa, directed and written by Gautham Vasudev Menon. The film attained cult status in Tamil cinema, and was a major breakthrough in his career. It was considered an image makeover for Silambarasan as most of his earlier films were in the action genre. The following year, he appeared in two films. The first was the ensemble drama Vaanam, where he stars as an impoverished cable operator. The second was Osthe, a remake of the Hindi film Dabangg where he played a police officer. Podaa Podi, which began production in 2008 and was released in 2012, was a commercial failure. His next appearance as a lead actor was in Vaalu (2015), followed by two releases in 2016: Pandiraj's Idhu Namma Aalu and Menon's Achcham Yenbadhu Madamaiyada.

== Film ==
Key
†	Denotes films that have not yet been released

- All films are in Tamil, unless otherwise noted.

Year	Film	Role(s)	Notes	Ref.
1984	Uravai Kaatha Kili	Silambarasu	Child artist	
1986	Mythili Ennai Kaathali	Girl	Uncredited role as a child artist; special appearance in the song "Ada Ponana Manasey"	
1987	Oru Thayin Sabhatham	Himself	Child artist; special appearance in the songs "Dharmanthan Jeyikkumunga" and "Enathu Ganamun"	
1988	En Thangai Kalyani	Simbhu	Child artist	
1989	Samsara Sangeetham	Simbhu	Child artist	
1991	Santhi Enathu Santhi	Babu	Child artist	
1992	Enga Veetu Velan	Velan	Child artist	
1993	Pettredutha Pillai	Kumaran	Child artist	
1993	Sabash Babu	Babu	Child artist	
1994	Oru Vasantha Geetham	Silambhu	Child artist	
1995	Thai Thangai Paasam	Velu	Child artist	
1999	Monisha En Monalisa	Himself	Child artist; special appearance in the song "Mo Mo Monisha"	
2001	Sonnal Thaan Kaadhala	Himself	Cameo appearance in the songs "Chukkumala" and "Velaa"	
2002	Kadhal Virus	Himself	Cameo appearance	
2002	Kadhal Azhivathillai	Simbhu	Debut as a lead actor	
2003	Dum	Sathya		
2003	Alai	Aadhi		
2004	Kovil	Sakthivel		
2004	Kuthu	Gurumoorthy		
2004	Manmadhan	Madhankumar (Manmadhan), Madhanraj (Note: Silambarasan played two different characters.)	Dual role; Also screenwriter and direction supervisor	
2005	Thotti Jaya	Jayachandran (Thotti Jaya) (Note: Silambarasan played a single character with two or more names.)		
2006	Saravana	Saravana		
2006	Vallavan	Vallavan	Also director and screenwriter	
2008	Kaalai	Jeeva		
2008	Silambattam	Vichu, Thamizharasan	Dual role	
2010	Goa	Madhankumar	Cameo appearance	
2010	Vinnaithaandi Varuvaayaa	Karthik Sivakumar		
2010	Ye Maaya Chesave	Himself	Telugu film; cameo appearance	
2011	Vaanam	Thillai Raja ("Cable" Raja)		
2011	Osthe	Osthe Velan		
2012	Podaa Podi	Arjun		
2013	Kanna Laddu Thinna Aasaiya	Himself	Cameo appearance	
2014	Inga Enna Solluthu	Raghu	Cameo appearance	
2015	Dongaata	Himself	Telugu film; cameo appearance	
2015	Kaaka Muttai	Himself	Cameo appearance	
2015	Vaalu	Sakthi (Sharp)		
2016	Idhu Namma Aalu	Shiva		
2016	Achcham Yenbadhu Madamaiyada	Rajinikanth Muralidharan		
2017	Anbanavan Asaradhavan Adangadhavan	Madura Michael (Ashwin Thatha), Thikku Siva	Dual role	
2018	Chekka Chivantha Vaanam	Ethiraj Senapathi		
2018	Kaatrin Mozhi	Himself	Cameo appearance	
2019	Vantha Rajavathaan Varuven	Adithya (Raja)		
2019	90 ML	Himself	Cameo appearance	
2021	Eeswaran	Eeswaran		
2021	Maanaadu	Abdul Khaliq		
2022	Maha	Malik	Cameo appearance	
2022	Vendhu Thanindhathu Kaadu	Muthuveeran		
2023	Pathu Thala	A. G. Raavanan (A. G. R.)		
2025	Thug Life	Amaran		
2027	Arasan†	Daas	Filming	

=== Short film ===
Year	Film	Role(s)	Notes	Ref.
2020	Karthik Dial Seytha Yenn	Karthik Sivakumar	Also cinematographer	

=== As a lyricist ===
List of Silambarasan film lyricist credits
Year	Song(s)	Film	Composer	Ref.
2003	"Adra Adra Dum"	Dum	Deva	
2006	"Loosu Penne"	Vallavan	Yuvan Shankar Raja	
2008	"Kaala Kaala"	Kaalai	G. V. Prakash Kumar	
2008	"Where Is The Party"	Silambattam	Yuvan Shankar Raja	
2011	"Love Anthem"	Non-album single	Silambarasan	
2011	"Evan Di Unna Pethan"	Vaanam	Yuvan Shankar Raja	
2011	"Pondati"	Osthe	S. Thaman	
2012	"Love Panlaama Venaama"	Podaa Podi	Dharan Kumar	
2012	"I Am A Kuthu Dancer"	Podaa Podi	Dharan Kumar	
2014	"Kuttipayale"	Inga Enna Solluthu	Silambarasan	
2015	"Love Endravan"	Vaalu	S. Thaman	
2015	"Engathaan Porantha"	Vaalu	S. Thaman	
2015	"Beep Song"	Non-album single	Anirudh Ravichander	
2016	"Kaathaga"	Idhu Namma Aalu	Kuralarasan	
2016	"Vote Song"	Non-album single	Silambarasan	
2017	"Trend Song"	Anbanavan Asaradhavan Adangadhavan	Yuvan Shankar Raja	
2017	"Spiritual Gaana"	Anbanavan Asaradhavan Adangadhavan	Yuvan Shankar Raja	
2017	"Thatha Love"	Anbanavan Asaradhavan Adangadhavan	Yuvan Shankar Raja	

== Television ==
Year	Show	Role(s)	Notes	Ref.
2007	Jodi Number One	Judge	Reality show	Vijay TV
2022	Bigg Boss Ultimate	Host	Reality show	Hotstar

== Voice over ==
Year	Title	For Whom / Character	Notes	Ref.
2009	Naanum Kodeeswaran (D)	Dev Patel / Jamal Malik		
2017	Katha Nayagan	Narrator		
2025	Aaromaley	Narrator		
