= Silambarasan discography =

Silambarasan (born 3 February 1984) is an Indian actor, director, music director, playback singer and lyricist working mainly for the Tamil film industry apart from some Telugu songs. He has worked with notable composers like A. R. Rahman, Yuvan Shankar Raja, Harris Jayaraj, Deva, Srikanth Deva, James Vasanthan, R. P. Patnaik, D. Imman, Hip Hop Adhi, Dhina, Anirudh, Devi Sri Prasad, G. V. Prakash Kumar, Thaman S etc.

== Discography ==
=== As a playback singer ===
List of Silambarasan film playback singing credits
Year	Song(s)	Film	Composer	Language	Notes	Ref.
1989	"I am a Little Star"	Samsara Sangeetham	T. Rajendar	Tamil		
1999	"Monisha"	Monisha En Monalisa	T. Rajendar	Tamil		
1999	"Mo Mo Monisha"	Monisha En Monalisa	T. Rajendar	Tamil		
1999	"Monalisa Monalisa"	Monisha En Monalisa	T. Rajendar	Tamil		
1999	"Monalisa Monalisa"	Yehi To Pyar Hai (D)	T. Rajendar	Hindi	Debut song in Hindi	
1999	"Monisha Monisha"	Yehi To Pyar Hai (D)	T. Rajendar	Hindi		
2002	"Mullaaga Kuththakkodaathu"	Sonnal Thaan Kaadhala	T. Rajendar	Tamil		
2002	"Chukkumala Chukkumala"	Sonnal Thaan Kaadhala	T. Rajendar	Tamil		
2002	"Baila More"	Kadhal Virus	A. R. Rahman	Tamil		
2002	"Jothikava"	Kadhal Azhivathillai	T. Rajendar	Tamil		
2002	"Clinton Magalo"	Kadhal Azhivathillai	T. Rajendar	Tamil		
2002	"Paarkadha Podhu Podhu"	Kadhal Azhivathillai	T. Rajendar	Tamil		
2002	"Kalakkuthu Karagaatam"	Sri Bannari Amman	T. Rajendar	Tamil		
2002	"Queen Marys"	Maaran	Deva	Tamil		
2002	"Sight Adippom"	April Maadhathil	Yuvan Shankar Raja	Tamil		
2002	"Stella Maris"	Samasthanam	Deva	Tamil		
2002	"Koththamalli"	Samasthanam	Deva	Tamil		
2002	"Dil Dil Dil"	Red	Deva	Tamil		
2003	"Natpe Natpe"	Whistle	D. Imman	Tamil		
2003	"Kuththadii Kuththadi"	Ramachandra	Deva	Tamil		
2003	"Kalakkuven"	Dum	Deva	Tamil		
2003	"Karuppo Sivappo"	Dum	Deva	Tamil		
2003	"Adra Adra Dum"	Dum	Deva	Tamil		
2003	"Kadhal Panna"	Kovil	Harris Jayaraj	Tamil		
2004	"Pothu Thaaku"	Kuthu	Srikanth Deva	Tamil		
2004	"En Aasai Mythiliae"	Manmadhan	Yuvan Shankar Raja	Tamil		
2004	"Thathai Thathai"	Manmadhan	Yuvan Shankar Raja	Tamil		
2004	"Chedi Onnu Mulaikudhey"	Manmadhan	Yuvan Shankar Raja	Tamil		
2006	"Gori Thera"	Saravana	Srikanth Deva	Tamil		
2006	"Kadhal Keedal"	Saravana	Srikanth Deva	Tamil		
2006	"Orangattu"	Yuga	Dhina	Tamil		
2006	"Eppadiyum Oruthankidda"	Nee Venunda Chellam	Dhina	Tamil		
2006	"Loosu Penne"	Vallavan	Yuvan Shankar Raja	Tamil		
2006	"Loosu Penne (Club Mix)"	Vallavan	Yuvan Shankar Raja	Tamil		
2006	"Kadhal Vanthirichu"	Vallavan	Yuvan Shankar Raja	Tamil		
2006	"Yammaadi Aathaadi"	Vallavan	Yuvan Shankar Raja	Tamil		
2006	"Loosu Ammayi"	Vallabha (D)	Yuvan Shankar Raja	Telugu	First Vocal In Telugu	
2006	"Loosu Ammayi (Club Mix)"	Vallabha (D)	Yuvan Shankar Raja	Telugu		
2007	"Hello Hello I Love You"	Veerasamy	T. Rajendar	Tamil		
2007	"Oyyale"	Nee Naan Nila	Dhina	Tamil		
2007	"Parangimala"	Pazhaniappa Kalloori	R. P. Patnaik	Tamil		
2008	"Pokkirina"	Sandai	Dhina	Tamil		
2008	"Mabbe Masakesindile"	Nenu Meeku Telusa?	Achu Rajamani	Telugu		
2008	"Thanni Karuthuruchi"	Ennai Theriyuma ...? (D)	Achu Rajamani	Tamil		
2008	"Kutti Pisase"	Kaalai	G. V. Prakash Kumar	Tamil		
2008	"Vanthutaanda Kaalai"	Kaalai	G. V. Prakash Kumar	Tamil		
2008	"Nallamdhana"	Silambattam	Yuvan Shankar Raja	Tamil		
2008	"Vechukkava (Remix)"	Silambattam	Yuvan Shankar Raja	Tamil		
2008	"Nijamena"	Maa Vaadu (D)	Yuvan Shankar Raja	Tamil		
2009	"Karuppayee"	Aathi Narayana	Srikanth Deva	Tamil		
2009	"Mansellam"	Kulir 100°	Bobo Shashi	Tamil		
2009	"Nan Unaku Niagara"	Vaigai	Sabesh–Murali	Tamil		
2009	"Thallakulam"	Renigunta	Ganesh Raghavendra	Tamil		
2009	"Mallakottai Kannu"	Anthony Yaar?	Dhina	Tamil		
2010	"Kannakkol Thiruda"	Nellu	S. S. Kumaran	Tamil		
2010	"Ka Ka Ka"	Naanayam	James Vasanthan	Tamil		
2010	"Pattu Pattu"	Thillalangadi	Yuvan Shankar Raja	Tamil		
2010	"Sundara Purusha"	Murattu Kaalai	Srikanth Deva	Tamil		
2010	"Sama Sama Yama Yama"	Drohi	V. Selvaganesh	Tamil		
2010	"Oola Vediyae"	Thottupaar	Srikanth Deva	Tamil		
2010	"Kaattuvazhi"	Mambattiyan	S. Thaman	Tamil		
2011	"No Money No Honey"	Vaanam	Yuvan Shankar Raja	Tamil		
2011	"Evan Di Unna Pethan"	Vaanam	Yuvan Shankar Raja	Tamil		
2011	"Pondati"	Osthe	S. Thaman	Tamil		
2011	"Nathiyile- Fully Loaded"	Doo	Abishek-Lawrence	Tamil		
2011	"Nathiyile Alai Ondru"	Doo	Abishek-Lawrence	Tamil		
2011	"Love Anthem For World Peace"	Non-album single	Silambarasan	Tamil		
2012	"Love Panlaama Venaama"	Podaa Podi	Dharan Kumar	Tamil		
2012	"I am a Kuthu Dancer"	Podaa Podi	Dharan Kumar	Tamil		
2012	"Appan Mavane Vaada"	Podaa Podi	Dharan Kumar	Tamil		
2012	"Natpukkillai Ellai"	Sridar (D)	Rahul Raj	Tamil		
2012	"Vandharai Vazhavaikum"	Mathil Mel Poonai	Ganesh Raghavendra	Tamil		
2013	"Oru Porambokku"	Kedi Billa Killadi Ranga	Yuvan Shankar Raja	Tamil		
2013	"Kalaipom"	Naan Rajavaga Pogiren	G. V. Prakash Kumar	Tamil		
2013	"Simbus Power Mix"	Backbench Student	Sunil Kashyap	Telugu		
2013	"Diamond Girl"	Baadshah	S. Thaman	Telugu	SIIMA Award - 2014 - Best Playback Singer - Male - Telugu	
2013	"Venannu Sonnada"	Anbha Azhaga	Arul Murugan	Tamil		
2013	"Vellithirai"	Netru Indru	Rehaan	Tamil		
2013	"Bujji Pilla"	Potugadu	Achu Rajamani	Telugu		
2014	"Kuttipayale"	Inga Enna Solluthu	Dharan Kumar	Tamil		
2014	"Maman Machan"	Vallinam	S. Thaman	Tamil		
2014	"Penne Penne"	Marumunai	Sathyadev	Tamil		
2014	"Engathaan Porantha"	Vaalu	S. Thaman	Tamil		
2014	"Love Endraven"	Vaalu	S. Thaman	Tamil		
2015	"Adiye Rathiye"	Sagaptham	Karthik Raja	Tamil		
2015	"Melathaalam"	Adida Melam	Abhishek	Tamil		
2015	"Aasai Mela"	Thiruttu Kalyanam	Vaidhy	Tamil		
2015	"Hitu Songu Maama"	Sakalakala Vallavan	S. Thaman	Tamil		
2015	"Desi Girl"	Sakalakala Vallavan	S. Thaman	Tamil		
2015	"Beep Song"	Non-album single	Anirudh Ravichander	Tamil		
2016	"Kaathaga"	Idhu Namma Aalu	Kuralarasan	Tamil		
2016	"En Raagam Oru Thalai Raagam"	Idhu Namma Aalu	Kuralarasan	Tamil		
2016	"Naa Ragam Ontriragam"	Sarasudu (D)	Kuralarasan	Tamil		
2016	"Vote Song"	Non-album single	Silambarasan	Tamil		
2016	"Thaarumaaru Thakkaalisoru"	Veera Sivaji	D. Imman	Tamil		
2016	"Hot Shot Hero"	Thikka	S. Thaman	Tamil		
2016	"Aattaikku Ready ah"	Non-album single	S. Thaman	Tamil		
2016	"Sumar Moonji Kumaru"	Bruce Lee	G. V. Prakash Kumar	Tamil		
2016	"Showkali"	Achcham Yenbadhu Madamaiyada	A. R. Rahman	Tamil	(Film Version)	
2017	"Trend Song"	Anbanavan Asaradhavan Adangadhavan	Yuvan Shankar Raja	Tamil		
2017	"Peiyophobilia"	Rum	Anirudh Ravichander	Tamil		
2017	"Raththam En Raththam"	Anbanavan Asaradhavan Adangadhavan	Yuvan Shankar Raja	Tamil		
2017	"Ek Gau Mein"	Sangili Bungili Kadhava Thorae	Vishal Chandrasekhar	Tamil		
2017	"Seruppu Song"	En Aaloda Seruppa Kaanom	Ishaan Dev	Tamil	100th song	
2018	"Bakku Bakku"	Thodraa	R. N. Uthamaraja	Tamil		
2018	"Kuniri Thakatha"	Iruvudellava Bittu	Sridhar V. Sambhram	Kannada	Debut singer in Kannada	
2018	"Naan Yaarunnu Theriyumma"	Raja Ranguski	Yuvan Shankar Raja	Tamil		
2018	"Periyar Kuthu"	Non-album single	Ramesh Thamilmani	Tamil		
2019	"Cow Song"	Natpuna Ennanu Theriyuma	Dharan Kumar	Tamil		
2019	"Pinjula Pinjula"	Simba	Vishal Chandrasekhar	Tamil		
2019	"Red Cardu"	Vantha Rajavathaan Varuven	Hiphop Tamizha	Tamil		
2019	"Gokka Makka"	Titanic	Nivas K. Prasanna	Tamil		
2019	"Marana Matta"	90ML	Silambarasan	Tamil		
2019	"Sivabaanam"	90ML	Silambarasan	Tamil		
2019	"Kadhal Kadikkuthu"	90ML	Silambarasan	Tamil		
2020	"Rainbow Thiralil"	Takkar	Nivas K. Prasanna	Tamil		
2020	"No Cash"	Thatrom Thookrom	Balamurali Balu	Tamil		
2020	"Dei Mamu"	Ivan Than Uthaman	S. Thaman	Tamil	Film unreleased	
2020	"Don't Worry Pullingo"	Irumbu Manithan	KS.Manoj	Tamil		
2020	"Superstar Anthem"	Friendship	DM.Udhay Kumar	Tamil		
2020	"Gneyang Kaatthal Sei"	Album Song	Srinath Pitchai	Tamil		
2021	"Mangalyam"	Eeswaran	S. Thaman	Tamil		
2021	"Yaaraiyum Ivalo Azhaga"	Sulthan	Vivek–Mervin	Tamil		
2021	"Muruga"	Yaadhum Oore Yaavarum Kelir	Nivas K Prasanna	Tamil		
2021	"CSK Sigangala"	Corona Kumar	Javed Riaz	Tamil	Film unreleased	
2021	"Voice of Unity"	Maanaadu	Yuvan Shankar Raja	Tamil		
2022	"FIR Theme song"	FIR	Ashwath	Tamil		
2022	"Bullet Song"	The Warriorr	Devi Sri Prasad	Telugu	Sang in both Tamil and Telugu	
2022	"Bullet Song"	The Warriorr	Devi Sri Prasad	Tamil	Sang in both Tamil and Telugu	
2022	"Kaalathukkum Nee Venum"	Vendhu Thanindhathu Kaadu	A. R. Rahman	Tamil		
2022	"Taali Taali"	Double XL	Sohail Sen	Hindi		
2022	"Time Ivvu Pilla"	18 Pages	Gopi Sundar	Telugu		
2023	"Thee Thalapathy"	Varisu	Thaman S	Tamil		
2025	"Yendi Vittu Pona"	Dragon	Leon James	Tamil		
2025	"Dillubaru Aaja"	Diesel	Dhibu Ninan Thomas	Tamil	Sung along with Shweta Mohan	
2025	"Firestorm"	They Call Him OG	Thaman S	Telugu		
2025	"Firestorm"	They Call Him OG (D)	Thaman S	Tamil		
2025	"Firestorm"	They Call Him OG (D)	Thaman S	Hindi		
2026	"Naanga Naalu Peru"	Karuppu	Sai Abhyankkar	Tamil	Sung along with Asal Kolaar & Sai Abhyankkar	

=== As composer ===
List of Silambarasan film composer credits
Year	Album	Notes	Ref.
2011	Love Anthem	Non-album single	
2014	Inga Enna Solluthu	Guest composer Only one song "Kuttipayale"	
2016	Vote Song	Non-album single	
2017	Sakka Podu Podu Raja		
2019	90ML		

== See also ==
- Silambarasan filmography
