= Usilai Mani =

Tamil actor

- Born: Subramaniyan Iyer; 1934; Usilampatti, Madurai, Tamil Nadu
- Died: 14 May 1996 (aged 61–62)
- Occupation: Actor
- Years active: 1965-1991
- Spouse: Meenakshi
- Children: 2

Usilai Mani was an Indian actor, who worked predominantly in the Tamil movie industry apart from Malayalam and Telugu films. He acted in over 1,000 films and stage plays. His popular movies include Enga Ooru Kavalkaran and Ayul Kaithi. His dialogue Besh besh, rumba nalla irukku (transl. it's very good) for a television commercial advertisement for Narasu's Coffee was famous in the 1980s and 1990s.

== Death ==
In 1993, he was diagnosed with diabetes. His legs were removed, leading him to stop acting. On 14 May 1996 he died aged 62. He was survived by his wife and children.

== Filmography ==
=== 1960s ===
Year	Film	Role	Notes
1965	Thiruvilaiyadal		
1966	Petralthan Pillaiya		
1966	Selvam		
1966	Mahakavi Kalidas	Poet	
1966	Sadhu Mirandal		
1966	Valiba Virundhu		
1966	Petralthan Pillaiya	Iyer	
1967	Kaavalkaaran	Patient	
1968	Kallum Kaniyagum		
1968	Kanavan		
1968	Oli Vilakku		
1968	Kannan En Kadhalan	Fake astrologer	
1968	Soappu Seeppu Kannadi		
1968	Jeevanaamsam		
1968	Naalum Therindhavan		
1968	Andru Kanda Mugam		
1968	Ragasiya Police 115		
1969	Kaaval Dheivam		

=== 1970s ===
Year	Film	Role	Notes
1970	Maattukara Velan		
1970	Kalam Vellum		
1970	Kanmalar		
1970	Paadhukaappu		
1971	Kumari Kottam		
1971	Aathi Parasakthi		
1971	Savaale Samali		
1971	Rickshawkaran		
1971	Neerum Neruppum		
1971	Deivam Pesuma		
1972	Thiruneelakandar		
1972	Needhi		
1972	Raman Thediya Seethai		
1972	Enna Muthalali Sowkiyama		
1972	Agathiyar		
1972	Jakkamma		
1972	Namma Veetu Deivam		
1973	Deivamsam		
1973	Sollathaan Ninaikkiren		
1973	Manipayal		
1973	Nathayil Muthu		
1973	Ponnunjal		
1973	Maru Piravi		
1974	Engamma Sapatham		
1974	Pillai Selvam		
1974	Anbu Thangai		
1974	Urimaikural		
1974	Prayachitham		
1974	Doctoramma		
1974	Akka		
1975	Maalai Sooda Vaa		
1975	Puthu Vellam		
1975	Idhayakkani		
1975	Pinju Manasu		
1976	Ore Thanthai		
1976	Kanavan Manaivi		
1976	Muthana Muthallavo		
1976	Uzhaikkum Karangal		
1977	Chollu Kanna Chollu		
1978	Kaatrinile Varum Geetham		
1978	Sattam En Kaiyil		
1978	Athirshtakaran		
1978	Ival Oru Seethai		
1978	Punniya Boomi		
1979	Inikkum Ilamai		
1979	Naan Vazhavaippen		
1979	Kavari Maan		
1979	Pattakkathi Bhairavan		
1979	Thisai Maariya Paravaigal		

=== 1980s ===
Year	Film	Role	Notes
1980	Billa	Rajappa's street acquaintance	
1980	Bhama Rukmani		
1980	Ellam Un Kairasi		
1980	Anbukku Naan Adimai		
1982	Simla Special	Bridegroom's father	
1982	Thanikattu Raja		
1982	Paritchaikku Neramaachu		
1982	Ayiram Muthangal		
1983	Uyirullavarai Usha		
1983	Sivappu Sooriyan		
1983	Thangaikkor Geetham		
1983	Apoorva Sagotharigal		
1983	Samayapurathale Satchi		
1984	Nalam Nalamariya Aaval		
1984	Uravai Kaatha Kili		
1984	Anbulla Rajinikanth		
1984	Niraparaadhi		
1984	Tharaasu		
1984	Ninaivugal		
1984	Vaidehi Kathirunthal	Shopkeeper	
1985	Oru Malarin Payanam		
1985	Uyarndha Ullam		
1985	Udaya Geetham		
1985	Kanni Rasi		
1985	Aan Paavam	Restaurant cook	
1986	Muthal Vasantham		
1986	Mythili Ennai Kaathali		
1986	Aruvadai Naal		
1986	Thazhuvatha Kaigal		
1987	Solvathellam Unmai		
1987	Enga Ooru Pattukaran		
1987	Chinna Thambi Periya Thambi		
1987	Chellakutti		
1987	Anand		
1988	En Thangai Kalyani		
1988	Raasave Unnai Nambi		
1988	Enga Ooru Kavalkaran		
1988	Paasa Paravaigal		
1988	Nethiyadi		
1989	Samsara Sangeetham		

=== 1990s ===
Year	Film	Role	Notes
1990	Paattali Magan		
1990	Palaivana Paravaigal		
1990	Aatha Naan Pass Ayittaen		
1990	Michael Madana Kama Rajan		
1990	Pudhu Padagan		
1991	Ayul Kaithi		
1991	Namma Ooru Mariamma		
1991	Moondrezhuthil En Moochirukkum		
1991	Pondatti Pondattithan		
1999	Poo Vaasam		Posthumous release

=== Other language ===
Year	Film	Role	Notes
1973	Thiruvabharanam		Malayalam
1975	Ammayila Sapatham		Telugu
1976	Seemantha Puthran		Malayalam
1976	Kamadhenu		Malayalam
1977	Kannappanunni		Malayalam
1978	Kadathanaattu Maakkam		Malayalam
1978	Kanalkattakal		Malayalam
1978	Kalpavriksham		Malayalam
1978	Jayikkaanaay Janichavan		Malayalam
1978	Thacholi Ambu		Malayalam
1980	Kaksha		Telugu
1980	Palattu Kunjikkannan		Malayalam
1980	Panchapandavar		Malayalam
1980	Thirayum Theeravum		Malayalam
1981	Sanchari		Malayalam
1981	Agnisaram		Malayalam
1983	Sagaram Santham		Malayalam
1984	Thathamme Poocha Poocha		Malayalam
1985	Surya Chandra		Telugu
1987	Inti Donga		Telugu
1987	Donga Kapuram		Telugu
1988	Khaidi No. 786		Telugu
1988	Murali Krishnudu		Telugu
1988	Ormmayilenum		Malayalam
