= Mumtaj =

Indian former actress

- Born: Nagma Khan; 5 July 1980 (age 46); Mumbai, Maharashtra, India
- Occupations: Actress, Dancer
- Years active: 1999 – 2018

Nagma Khan (born 5 July 1980), known mononymously as Mumtaj is an Indian actress known for her works in Tamil, Telugu, Hindi, Kannada and Malayalam language films. She entered the film industry through the Tamil film Monisha En Monalisa (1999) and subsequently starred in Kushi (2000), Kushi (2001), Looty (2001), Chocolate (2001), Gemini (2002), Chellame (2004), London (2005), Veerasamy (2007) and Rajadhi Raja (2009). In the early 2000s, she appeared in notable item numbers. In 2018, after her appearance in Bigg Boss Tamil 2 (marked her last media appearance), she announced her retirement from the film industry for good after spending 19 years in the industry and has no interest in making a comeback to the industry.

== Early life ==
Mumtaj was born Nagma Khan on 5 July 1980 in Mumbai, Maharashtra, India into a Tamil Muslim family. She completed her schooling at Mount Mary's Convent School, Bandra, Mumbai. As a teenage ardent film fan, she revealed that her room was full of posters featuring Sridevi, and when the school bus used to cross Filmistan Studios, she used to crane her neck out to catch a glimpse of the artistes.

== Film career ==
Mumtaj's acting career began after she was spotted by film producer Sudhakar Bokade in a dance programme at Mount Mary's Convent School in Mumbai, when he subsequently offered to do a film with her, after he completed an ongoing project with Dilip Kumar titled Kalinga during 1996. As Kalinga faced delays, Bokade could not eventually start the film with Mumtaj although she had begun acting classes.

During her stint at the acting course, she was recruited by veteran filmmaker Chetan Anand to work on his film produced by Bharat Shah, with Shah Rukh Khan in the lead role. For one and a half years, Mumtaj waited for the shoot to begin, before the project was shelved following Anand's death. Later in 1997, Tamil director T. Rajender signed her to play the lead role of a pop singer in his romantic drama film, Monisha En Monalisa (1999). The film took two years to make owing to production troubles and Rajender's political activity, before opening to negative reviews from critics in April 1999.

She made a supporting role in S. J. Surya's Kushi (2000), where she portrayed a glamorous college student alongside Vijay and Jyothika. Her performance in the song "Kattipudi Kattipudida" won her appreciation and further film offers, and as a result, Mumtaj was able to increase her appearance fee substantially.

In her subsequent projects, rather than her acting skills, her performances in song sequences won her appreciation and she regularly accepted to feature in item numbers. In the early 2000s, some of the more notable music videos shot on her included "Macha Machiniye" from Star (2001), "Malai Malai" from Chocolate (2001),"Missi Missi Papa" from Looty and "Subbamma Subbamma" from Roja Kootam (2002).

Despite the success of her song appearances, she was keen to prolong her career in the film industry by selecting performance-oriented roles and subsequently announced her intentions of reducing one-song appearances.

In 2003, she turned producer and financed the film Thathi Thavadhu Manasu, featuring her alongside rookie actresses Sona, Urvasi Patel and Sindhuri in the leading roles. The film was based around two real life incidents — the murder of a lawyer in bright daylight and the accident in which 40 individuals were killed. The film performed poorly at the box office, with a critic writing "the movie's approach struggles between two completely opposite directions — a cheap, exploitative film and a tearjerker" and that "the producer seems to have banked on the film's glamour to bring in the viewers since that is what the title and the movie's promos focus on" and that "this is unfortunate because the main story has actually been taken quite well".

She has since seldom been seen in films, making a brief foray to play the antagonist in Rajadhi Raja (2009), before appearing in the Telugu films, Atharintiki Daaredi (2013) and Aagadu (2014) in glamorous supporting roles.

Mumtaj quit acting in 2018 and has been an ardent practitioner of Islam, requesting the media to avoid sharing photos of her former self. She is also a preacher of the Islamic faith and a motivational speaker.

== Other work ==
Mumtaj was a judge in the first season of the reality dance competition Boys Vs Girls, which aired on Star Vijay, and season 6 of Maanada Mayilada, which aired on Kalaignar TV. She later took part as one of the contestants in the Tamil reality show, Bigg Boss Tamil 2 hosted by Kamal Haasan. Marking her final appearance in the industry before her retirement.

== Filmography ==
Year	Film	Role	Language	Notes
1999	Monisha En Monalisa	Monisha	Tamil	
1999	Malabar Police	Julie	Tamil	
1999	Chala Bagundi	Herself	Telugu	Special appearance in the song "Entha Bagundhi Brotheru"
1999	Jananaayakan	Nancy Parera	Malayalam	
1999	Unakkaga Ellam Unakkaga		Tamil	Special appearance in the song "Duniya Hey Duniya"
2000	Kushi	Anitha	Tamil	
2000	Budget Padmanabhan	Omana	Tamil	
2000	Ammo! Okato Tareekhu	Ganga	Telugu	
2001	Boond	Neelam	Hindi	
2001	Kushi	Anitha	Telugu	
2001	Looty	Gayathri	Tamil	
2001	Sonnal Thaan Kaadhala	Chitra	Tamil	
2001	Star	Herself	Tamil	Special appearance in the song "Machiniye"
2001	Vedham	Pooja	Tamil	
2001	Chocolate	Nirmala / Bhama	Tamil	Dual roles
2001	Mitta Miraasu	Vijaya	Tamil	
2001	Yeh Teraa Ghar Yeh Meraa Ghar	Anupam Verma	Hindi	
2001	Azhagana Naatkal	Rekha	Tamil	
2002	Vivaramana Aalu	Puppy	Tamil	
2002	Roja Kootam	Herself	Tamil	Special appearance in the song "Subbammaa"
2002	Ezhumalai	Sandhya	Tamil	
2002	Gemini	Kamini	Telugu	
2002	Coolie	Rani	Telugu	
2002	Kondaveeti Simhasanam	Susmitha	Telugu	
2002	Thandavam	Kaavya Menon	Malayalam	
2003	Three Roses	Roma	Tamil	
2003	Thathi Thavadhu Manasu	Aarthi	Tamil	Also producer
2004	Maha Nadigan	Nandini	Tamil	
2004	Kuthu	Herself	Tamil	Special appearance in the song "Otha Viral Kattuna"
2004	Kanti	Herself	Kannada	Special appearance in the song "Ussaaru Ussaaru"
2004	Aai	Herself	Tamil	Special appearance in the song "Mailapur Mayila"
2004	Chellame	Herself	Tamil	guest appearance
2004	Nalla	Madhu	Kannada	
2005	Devathayai Kanden	Herself	Tamil	Special appearance in the song "Thunda Kanom Thuniya Kanom"
2005	London	Aishwarya	Tamil	
2005	Pelli Kaani Pellam Avuthundi	Herself	Telugu	
2006	Jerry	Janani	Tamil	
2007	Veerasamy	Sarasu	Tamil	
2008	Nadigai	Herself	Tamil	
2009	Rajadhi Raja	Shylai Saroja	Tamil	
2013	Atharintiki Daaredi	Mumtaj	Telugu	Special appearance in the song "It's Time To Party"
2014	Aagadu	Sukanya / Belly Lilly	Telugu	
2015	Tommy	Herself	Telugu	

== Television ==
Year	Series/Shows	Role	Channel	Notes
2009	Boys Vs. Girls	Judge	Star Vijay	
2011	Maanada Mayilada	Judge	Kalaignar TV	Season 06
2018	Bigg Boss Tamil 2	Contestant	Star Vijay	Evicted on Day 91
