= Thangaikkor Geetham =

- Theatrical release poster
- Directed by: T. Rajendar
- Written by: T. Rajendar
- Produced by: Usha Rajendar
- Starring: Sivakumar; T. Rajendar; Anand Babu; Nalini
- Cinematography: T. Rajendar
- Edited by: R. Devarajan
- Music by: T. Rajendar
- Production company: Thanjai Cine Arts
- Release date: 4 November 1983
- Country: India
- Language: Tamil

Thangaikkor Geetham (transl. A Song For The Younger Sister) is a 1983 Indian Tamil-language film written, directed and scored by T. Rajendar. The film stars Sivakumar, Rajendar, Anand Babu and Nalini. It marks Anand Babu's acting debut. The film was released on 4 November 1983, and became a box office hit.

== Plot ==
Soolakaruppan is forced to abandon his education at a young age to care for his younger sister, Sudha. Unable to rely on their alcoholic father and abusive stepmother, he leaves home with Sudha in search of a better life. Soolakaruppan takes on various odd jobs to support them and eventually secures work at a factory.

A strong believer in justice, Soolakaruppan often confronts wrongdoing, leading to frequent clashes with his boss and the boss's son. Despite these difficulties, he remains determined that Sudha completes her college education.

While at college, Sudha falls in love with Babu, a dancer, but distances herself upon realising his true womanising nature. Meanwhile, Inspector Harichandran, who values education and disapproves of dowry, hopes to marry a poor but educated woman. However, his aunt and uncle insist on finding a wealthy bride for him.

Soolakaruppan arranges Sudha's marriage to Harichandran, but his family demands a hefty dowry without Harichandran's knowledge. At the last moment, Soolakaruppan's boss sabotages his efforts, preventing him from securing the money. In desperation, Soolakaruppan arranges the wedding using fake jewellery.

Sudha marries Harichandran, but conceals the truth to avoid complications. Soon after, Soolakaruppan's boss frames him for crimes he did not commit, forcing Harichandran to arrest his brother-in-law. The fake jewellery is also discovered, and Babu reappears, blackmailing Sudha with her past.

Soolakaruppan overcomes immense obstacles to protect Sudha's marriage and ensure she can live happily with Harichandran.

== Cast ==
- Sivakumar as Harichandran
- T. Rajendar as Soolakaruppan
- Anand Babu as Babu
- Nalini as Sudha, Soolakaruppan's sister
- Senthamarai as Soolakaruppan's boss
- Sathyaraj as Nayaka
- Vennira Aadai Moorthy
- S. S. Chandran as Harichandran's uncle
- Gandhimathi as Harichandran's aunt
- Idichapuli Selvaraj as Thakkali
- Master Haja Sheriff as Moorthy
- Usilai Mani as Tharakar
- Pasi Narayanan
- Rajani
- Sushma
- Shanthi
- Nasreen
- Vani

== Production ==
Thangaikkor Geetham is the debut for Anand Babu as an actor. The dubbing voice for him was given by S. N. Surendar. The song "Idhu Rathri Neram" was shot at K. R. Vijaya's garden. The final length of the film was 4,878 metres (16,004 ft).

== Soundtrack ==
The music was composed by Rajendar, who also wrote the lyrics. For the Telugu-dubbed version Prema Samrajyam, all lyrics were written by Rajasri.

Tamil version

Song	Singers	Length
"Pahelendrum Iravendrum"	S. P. Balasubrahmanyam, Sasirekha	04:57
"Ye Machchi"	Malaysia Vasudevan	04:33
"Dhinam Dhinam"	S. P. Balasubrahmanyam	04:40
"Idhu Rathiri Neram"	S. P. Balasubrahmanyam, Sasirekha	04:49
"Thanga Nilave"	S. P. Balasubrahmanyam	04:55
"Thanjavooru Melam"	S. P. Balasubrahmanyam	05:02
"Thanniyilla Meenai Pole"	LR. Anjali	05:02
"Thattiparthen"	T. Rajendar	04:46

Telugu version

Song	Singers	Length
"Anudinam – 1984"	S. P. Balasubrahmanyam	01:18
"Prathireyi Prathi Pagalu"	S. P. Balasubrahmanyam, S. Janaki	04:53
"Idhi Raathri Samayam"	S. P. Balasubrahmanyam, S. Janaki	04:57
"Sannayi Dolu Melam"	S. P. Balasubrahmanyam	04:58
"Galipata"	S. P. Balasubrahmanyam	04:54
"Anudinam – Disco"	S. P. Balasubrahmanyam	04:43
"Ye Maradala"	S. P. Balasubrahmanyam	04:12
"Lokalu Elevada"	S. Janaki	04:49

== Release and reception ==
Thangaikkor Geetham was released on 4 November 1983, Diwali day. Jayamanmadhan of Kalki appreciated the music, but said the film was fatigue inducing. Balumani of Anna praised Rajendar's acting but criticised him for dominating every frame while also feeling he should not have burdened himself with composing and penning all songs and could have shared the responsibilities with other experienced persons. He also praised the acting of other cast members, Rajendar's rhyming dialogues, cinematography in songs and felt the film will be liked by women and youngsters.

== Legacy ==
The dialogue "Vaada En Machi Vaazhakka Bajji" (transl. Come my bro, banana fritter) gained a cult following, and was used in a scene in the 2017 film Kavan in which Rajendar's character signs this dialogue instead of his signature. The dialogue is also used in the 2021 film Master, moments before JD (Vijay) kills Bhavani (Vijay Sethupathi).
