= Nenjil Oru Raagam =

- Title card
- Directed by: T. Rajendar
- Written by: T. Rajendar
- Produced by: R. Shantha
- Starring: Thiagarajan; Saritha
- Cinematography: N. K. Viswanathan
- Edited by: R. Devarajan
- Music by: T. Rajendar
- Production company: KRG Art Productions
- Release date: 14 May 1982
- Country: India
- Language: Tamil

Nenjil Oru Raagam (transl. A melody in the heart) is a 1982 Indian Tamil-language film written, directed and scored by T. Rajendar. The film stars Thiagarajan and Saritha. It was released on 14 May 1982, and did not perform well at the box office.

== Plot ==
Shiva is a drummer in a music troop and a womaniser. Geetha is a rich girl who is interested in singing. Even though the guitarist in the troop courts her, she falls for Shiva and marries him against the wishes of her family. Shiva reveals his true colours after marriage, and Geetha is devastated.

== Cast ==
- Thiagarajan as Shiva
- Saritha as Geetha
- S. A. Ashokan
- Master Anand
- Vennira Aadai Moorthy
- Rajeev as the guitarist
- T. Rajendar as Madhu
- Gandhimathi
- Vanitha

== Soundtrack ==
The music was composed by Rajender, who also wrote the lyrics. The song "Nenjam Paadum" attained popularity.

Track listing
No.	Title	Singer(s)	Length
1.	"Idhaya Vaasal"	P. Jayachandran	4:49
2.	"Meghamthaan"	S. P. Balasubrahmanyam	4:42
3.	"Nalamo Ena"	Vani Jairam	4:30
4.	"Nenjam Paadum"	S. Janaki, S. P. Balasubrahmanyam	4:35
5.	"Munthaanai"	S. P. Balasubrahmanyam	4:37
6.	"Kurudaana Kavingnanukku"	B. S. Sasirekha, T. M. Soundararajan	4:59
Total length:			28:12

== Critical reception ==
Thiraignani of Kalki praised the acting of Saritha and Rajiv while also praising Rajender who despite handling many departments has also acted in the film and concluded advising Rajender to put a curb on the desire to say everything he thinks on the screen, sir, because since that desire is overflowing in this film, it gives a feeling as if the film is going in slow motion.
