= Pasi Narayanan =

Indian actor (active 1967–1998)

- Born: Narayanan; 1940; Sivakasi, Tamil Nadu, India
- Died: 1998 (aged 57–58); Udumalaipettai, Tamil Nadu, India
- Occupation: Actor
- Years active: 1967-1998
- Spouse: Valli
- Children: 3

Narayanan, better known as Pasi Narayanan, was an Indian stage and film actor known for performing comedic roles alongside actor Goundamani. Narayanan acted in over 500 Tamil-language films and is known for the catchphrase, "Phone wire pinchi oru vaaram aachu..." (transl. It has been one week since the phone wire tore...) from Surieyan.

== Early life ==
Narayanan was born in Sivakasi district of Tamil Nadu and started acting at the age of 15.

== Career ==
He later acted in several dramas in 1955 through Manohar Company. After that he got a chance to act in the cinema industry. He came to the Tamil film industry in the 1960s. He became popular with the film Pasi. He then went on to become famous in the screen world under the pseudonym 'Pasi' Narayanan. In addition to acting, he had talent in storytelling and dancing. Pasi Narayanan was also involved in many films of the next generation of leading heroes like Rajinikanth and Kamal Haasan, Pandiyarajan, Karthick, and Sarath Kumar.

== Death ==
In 1998, he developed heart disease and later died from heart failure. His second to last movie was Ninaithen Vandhai. He was survived by his wife Valli and 3 children.

== Partial filmography ==
Year	Film	Role	Notes
1965	Aayirathil Oruvan		Uncredited
1966	Anbe Vaa	College gang member	Uncredited
1967	Iru Malargal	Tour guide	
1967	Raja Veetu Pillai		
1968	Kudiyirundha Koyil		
1972	Mappillai Alaippu		
1974	Shishupalan		
1974	Sirithu Vazha Vendum		
1979	Pasi	Sound Kannaiya	
1981	Aani Ver		
1981	Pattam Parakkattum		
1982	Poi Satchi		
1982	Mul Illatha Roja		
1983	Thangaikkor Geetham		
1983	Aanandha Kummi		
1984	Naan Mahaan Alla	Chettiyar	
1985	Mannukketha Ponnu		
1985	Sugamana Raagangal		
1985	Kanni Rasi		
1985	Idaya Kovil		
1985	Pillai Nila		
1985	Aan Paavam		
1985	Kunguma Chimil		
1985	Engal Kural		
1986	Namma Ooru Nalla Ooru		
1986	Oru Iniya Udhayam		
1986	Thazhuvatha Kaigal		
1987	Valayal Satham		
1987	Manaivi Ready	Tamil teacher	
1987	Mannukkul Vairam		
1987	Ninaive Oru Sangeetham		
1987	Shankar Guru		
1987	Chinna Thambi Periya Thambi		
1988	En Thangai Kalyani		
1988	Senthoora Poove		
1988	Therkathi Kallan		
1988	Oruvar Vaazhum Aalayam		
1988	En Thangachi Padichava		
1988	Naan Sonnathey Sattam		
1989	Siva		
1989	Ponmana Selvan		
1989	Samsara Sangeetham		
1990	Paattukku Naan Adimai	Pallsu	
1990	Namma Ooru Poovatha		
1990	Salem Vishnu		
1990	Maruthu Pandi		
1990	Naanum Indha Ooruthan		
1991	Vaidehi Kalyanam		
1991	Moondrezhuthil En Moochirukkum		
1992	Kottai Vaasal		
1992	Suriyan	Ottavaai Narayana	
1992	Abhirami		
1992	Magudam		
1992	Thangarasu		
1992	Natchathira Nayagan		
1992	Periya Gounder Ponnu		
1993	Mutrugai		
1993	Maravan		
1993	Parvathi Ennai Paradi		
1993	Karuppu Vellai		
1993	Enga Muthalali		
1994	Subramaniya Swamy		
1994	Nila		
1994	Aranmanai Kaavalan		
1994	Sevatha Ponnu		
1994	Pudhiya Mannargal		
1994	Sindhu Nathi Poo		
1994	Jallikattu Kaalai		
1995	Neela Kuyil		
1995	Paattu Vaathiyar		
1995	Valli Vara Pora		
1995	Chandralekha		
1995	Mannukku Mariyadhai		
1995	Thirumoorthy		
1995	Thamizhachi		
1995	Karuppu Nila		
1995	Gandhi Pirantha Mann		
1995	Chinna Mani		
1996	Sundara Purushan		
1996	Thirumbi Paar		
1996	Mappillai Manasu Poopola		
1996	Senathipathi	Thavasi	
1997	Minsara Kanavu	Lawrence school watchman	
1997	Periya Thambi	Petty shop owner	
1997	Bharathi Kannamma		
1997	Vasuki		
1997	Themmangu Paattukaaran		
1997	Thaali Pudhusu		
1997	Kadhal Palli		
1998	Maru Malarchi		
1998	Ulavuthurai		
1998	Moovendhar		
1998	Ninaithen Vandhai		
1998	Rathna	Petty shop owner	Last movie
