= Engal Kural =

- Directed by: Rama Narayanan
- Written by: Rama Narayanan
- Produced by: S. S. Chandran
- Starring: Arjun; Suresh; Nalini; Jeevitha
- Cinematography: N. K. Viswanathan
- Edited by: K. Gowthaman
- Music by: T. Rajendar
- Production company: Sivagangai Screens
- Distributed by: Sri Thenandal Pictures
- Release date: 15 August 1985
- Running time: 137 minutes
- Country: India
- Language: Tamil

Engal Kural (transl. Our Voice) is a 1985 Indian Tamil-language crime film, directed by Rama Narayanan and produced by S. S. Chandran. The film stars Arjun, Suresh, Nalini and Jeevitha. It was released on 15 August 1985.

== Plot ==
When Raghupathi kills Maari, the latter's brother decides to take revenge on him. He kills Raghupathi's wife and kidnaps their son, and later raises the child to become a criminal.

== Cast ==
- Arjun as Raja
- Suresh as Thyagu
- Jeevitha as Shanthi
- Jaishankar in guest appearance as Raja, Thyagu, and Shanthi's father
- Nalini as Meena
- Radha Ravi
- Sangili Murugan
- Vennira Aadai Moorthy
- S. S. Chandran
- Kallapetti Singaram
- Krishnamurthy
- Jagadeesan
- Anuradha
- Vadivukkarasi
- Gandhimathi
- C. K. Saraswathi
- Pasi Sathya
- Vani
- Kovai Sarala
- Pasi Narayanan
- Vijayakanth in guest appearance
- V. K. Ramasamy in guest appearance
- Ambika in guest appearance
- Jayachitra in guest appearance
- Chandrasekhar in guest appearance

== Production ==
Vijayakanth made a special appearance, and charged no remuneration for doing so.

== Soundtrack ==
Soundtrack was composed by T. Rajendar, who also wrote the lyrics.

Track listing
No.	Title	Singer(s)	Length
1.	"Sugam Sugam"	S. Janaki
2.	"Oorapaatha"	Malaysia Vasudevan, Jayachandran
3.	"Adi Vaadi Maane"	S. P. Balasubrahmanyam, Sasirekha
4.	"Daagam Konda"	Sasirekha
5.	"Mudhal Iravu"	S. P. Balasubrahmanyam, S. Janaki
6.	"Maane Engedi"	Malaysia Vasudevan
