= Raagam Thedum Pallavi =

- Theatrical release poster
- Directed by: T. Rajendar
- Written by: T. Rajendar
- Produced by: Balakrishnan
- Starring: Shankar; Rajeev; Jayamalini
- Cinematography: A. Somasundaram
- Edited by: Devarajan
- Music by: T. Rajendar
- Production company: Raja Cine Arts
- Release date: 12 March 1982
- Country: India
- Language: Tamil

Raagam Thedum Pallavi (/rɑːɡəm θeɪdʊm pəlləvi/ transl. The pallavi searching for a raga) is a 1982 Indian Tamil-language film written, directed and scored by T. Rajendar. The film stars Shankar and Rajeev. It was released on 12 March 1982.

== Cast ==
- Shankar as Madhu
- Rajeev
- Anu
- Jayamalini
- Jyothi Lakshmi
- Vennira Aadai Moorthy
- Kallapetti Singaram as a Malayali
- Ramji as a patient
- Gandhimathi
- Master Haja Sheriff
- T. Rajendar in a cameo appearance as an actor

== Production ==
Some scenes were shot at Patiala House opposite the Sri Lankan Embassy, Madras.

== Soundtrack ==
The soundtrack was composed by T. Rajendar, who also wrote the lyrics.

Track listing
| No. | Title | Singer(s) | Length |
|---|---|---|---|
| 1. | "Naan Aathankarai" | S. Janaki and chorus | 4:28 |
| 2. | "Romba Naalaaga" | S. P. Balasubrahmanyam | 4:50 |
| 3. | "Naan Azhuthathum" | S. Janaki | 4:28 |
| 4. | "Antha Kaanangaatha" | Vani Jairam, B. S. Sasirekha | 5:03 |
| 5. | "Aazh Kadalil" | | 4:27 |
| 6. | "Moongilile" | S. P. Balasubrahmanyam | 5:01 |
| Total length: | | | 28:17 |

== Reception ==
Kalki praised the performances of Rajeev as the antagonist, Ramji as a patient but panned the acting of Shankar and Anupama and concluded saying neither cannot be appreciated nor cannot be ignored completely and called it neither both.
