= En Aasai Thangachi =

- Directed by: K. Shanmugamani
- Written by: K. Shanmugamani
- Produced by: S. S. Ramasamy
- Starring: Ramki; Balambika; Mohana
- Edited by: Chezhian
- Music by: T. Rajendar
- Production company: Raams Movies
- Release date: 2 August 1996
- Country: India
- Language: Tamil

En Aasai Thangachi (transl. My dear younger sister) is a 1996 Indian Tamil-language drama film written and directed by K. Shanmugamani. The film stars Ramki, Balambika and Mohana. It was released on 2 August 1996.

== Cast ==
- Ramki as Dorai
- Balambika
- Mohana
- A. R. Rajaram
- Goundamani
- Alex
- Baby Priyanka
- Shanmugasundaram
- Samikannu
- Suryakanth
- Nalinikanth
- Y. Vijaya
- Loose Mohan
- N. S. Krishnan (archive footage)
- T. A. Mathuram (archive footage)

== Soundtrack ==
The music was composed by T. Rajendar, who also wrote the lyrics. A critic wrote that "Of his nine songs ‘Vararu Maapillai’ is the best where the contents of the song, through the soulful rendering of S. P. Balasubramaniam, find meaning and expression".

Track listing
No.	Title	Singer(s)	Length
1.	"Ettu Patti Kedkum Varai"	Malaysia Vasudevan, K. S. Chithra	5:24
2.	"Indhaa Idukaa"	Swarnalatha, S. P. Balasubrahmanyam	4:53
3.	"Kaanangatu"	Sindhu	1:22
4.	"Kandangi"	Sindhu	4:41
5.	"Pachai Valai Eduthu"	Sindhu, chorus	1:27
6.	"Pachai Kili"	Sindhu, S. P. Balasubrahmanyam	5:12
7.	"Pillayar"	Shobana	6:46
8.	"Ponnumani Kannumani"	S. P. Balasubrahmanyam, chorus	5:13
9.	"Vaararu Maapillai"	S. P. Balasubrahmanyam	5:33
Total length:			40:31

== Reception ==
D. S. Ramanujam of The Hindu wrote that "Despite the Censors punching out the dialogue in a couple of places the director manages to develop a fairly interesting pace, using the music as the best ally".
