= Vallavan =

- Theatrical release poster
- Directed by: Silambarasan
- Written by: Silambarasan; Balakumaran (dialogues)
- Produced by: P. L. Thenappan
- Starring: Silambarasan; Nayanthara; Reema Sen
- Cinematography: Priyan; R. D. Rajasekhar
- Edited by: Anthony
- Music by: Yuvan Shankar Raja
- Production company: Sri Raj Lakshmi Films
- Release date: 21 October 2006
- Running time: 185 minutes
- Country: India
- Language: Tamil

Vallavan (transl. Expert), alternatively spelled as Valaavaan, (Note: The third and fifth As in "Valaavaan" are not pronounced.) is a 2006 Indian Tamil-language romantic thriller film written and directed by Silambarasan, starring himself in the lead role alongside Nayanthara and Reema Sen whilst Sandhya, Santhanam, Premji and Sathyan play supporting roles. The dialogues are written by Balakumaran, and the film was produced by P. L. Thenappan. The film's score and soundtrack are composed by Yuvan Shankar Raja. The story follows Vallavan, a happy-go-lucky college student who falls in love with Swapna. He soon discovers that Swapna is a trainee lecturer at his college and is three years older than him.

Vallavan released on 21 October 2006. It received mixed reviews and became a decent hit at the box office. The songs became chartbusters.

== Plot ==
Vallavan is a happy-go-lucky college student. While he and his friends are at a temple, he sees Swapna and immediately falls in love with her. Vallavan reencounters her, and she is revealed to be a lecturer who is three years older than him. He decides to woo her by turning into Pallan, an ugly duckling with buck teeth and thick glasses. Pallan makes Swapna fall in love with him for his heart. He then reveals his disguise at a wedding reception and introduces her to his friends. At the party, they try to convince her indirectly to accept a younger man, but she doesn't budge. After that, Vallavan drops her off at her home. Both feel romance and have sex. He assures marrying her. When Swapna learns that Pallan is younger than her (from one of Vallavan's rivals at the college) and also a student, she breaks off her relationship with him and decides to marry another man.

As Vallavan walks in the streets, wondering how things got so messy, he recalls his school life. When he was in higher secondary school, Vallavan met the hysteric and toxic Geetha, who ensures that Vallavan is mad about her. Learning of her true nature, he ends their relationship. She is not ready to let him go so easily, and he teaches her a lesson.

Geetha returns for payback and tells Vallavan that she is the reason for the current mess in his life. In an effort to win his love, Vallavan, once again as Pallan, goes to convince Swapna that even though he is younger than her, his love for her is true, and age does not matter. Swapna realizes her mistake, and they reconcile, infuriating Geetha. In a climax displaying her disorder, she kidnaps Vallavan's friend Suji, and Vallavan arrives and frees her.

The film fast-forwards to three years later, where Geetha is released from a mental asylum. The moment she steps out, she exhibits her fiery, psychotic expression, showing that she never actually recovered. Vallavan is waiting for her, and they communicate telepathetically, with Vallavan saying that she cannot hurt him.

== Cast ==
- Silambarasan as Vallavan, a college student
- Nayanthara as Swapna, a teacher and Vallavan's love interest
- Reema Sen as Geethakumari "Geetha", Vallavan's ex-girlfriend
- Sandhya as Suji, Vallavan's best friend
- Santhanam as Soori, Suji's brother and Vallavan's friend
- Sathyan as Subbu, Vallavan's friend
- Premji as Swapna's friend
- S. V. Shekhar as Suji and Soori's father
- Janaki Sabesh as Suji and Soori's mother
- Shankar as Vallavan's school friend (flashback)
- Karthik Sabesh as Vallavan's school friend (flashback)
- Thara Srinivasan as Premji's wife
- Venu Arvind
- Deepa Venkat
- Kadhal Sukumar
- Kottachi
- Sembuli Jagan
- Guhan Shanmugam
- Rajendranath
- Balakumaran as Psychiatrist (cameo appearance)
- T. Rajendar as dancer in song "Yammadi Aathadi" (special appearance)
- Kanal Kannan as a spectator watching Vallavan's fight from his car (cameo appearance)
- Mahat Raghavendra as Vallavan's friend and miscellaneous (uncredited role)
- Jagan as Vallavan's friend (uncredited role)

== Music ==
The music was scored by noted musician and Silambarasan's friend, Yuvan Shankar Raja, coming together again after churning out the successful album of Manmadhan (2004). The soundtrack was released on 1 June 2006 and features nine tracks, including seven songs and two instrumental pieces. As it was the case in Manmadhan, a second soundtrack was released afterwards with bit songs that feature in the film but not on the first soundtrack along with pieces from the film score. The lyrics were penned by Vaali, Thamarai, film director Perarasu and Silambarasan himself. Karunakaran wrote the lyrics of the bit song "Kadhal Vandhale", released in the second edition.

Yuvan Shankar Raja won accolades for his soundtrack, whereas especially the songs "Loosu Penne" and "Yammaadi Aathaadi" were both popular. The song "Kadhal Vanthirichu" was remixed from the film Kalyanaraman (1979), composed by Yuvan's father Ilaiyaraaja.

Track listing
No.	Title	Lyrics	Singer(s)	Length
1.	"Vallava Ennai"	Thamarai	Sunidhi Chauhan	6:29
2.	"Hooray Hooray Hip"	Vaali	Sunitha Sarathy, Nakul, Ranjith, Karthik	5:44
3.	"Kadhal Vanthirichu"	Vaali	Silambarasan, Premji Amaren	4:25
4.	"Loosu Penne"	Silambarasan TR	Silambarasan TR, Blaaze	6:52
5.	"Yammaadi Aathadi"	Perarasu	T. Rajendar, Silambarasan, Suchitra, Mahathi	5:30
6.	"Podu Attam Podu"	Vaali	Vijay Yesudas	5:38
7.	"He Knows What To Do (Vallavan Theme)"		Tanvi Shah (humming)	2:00
8.	"Success of Love"		Instrumental	1:05
9.	"Loosu Penne (Club Mix)"	Silambarasan	Silambarasan, Premji Amaren	4:02

Bonus tracks (Second release)
No.	Title	Singer(s)	Length
10.	"Yammaadi Aathaadi (2nd Version)"	T. Rajendar, Silambarasan, Suchitra, Mahathi	5:24
11.	"Hip Hip Hurrey (2nd Version)"	Sunitha Sarathy, Nakul, Ranjith, Karthik	5:38
12.	"Theme Music (1)"	Instrumental	1:38
13.	"Theme Music (2)"	Instrumental	0:47
14.	"Loose Penne (Music)"	Instrumental	0:50
15.	"Kadhal Vandhale" (Lyrics written by Karunakaran)	Yuvan Shankar Raja	2:26
16.	"Folk Bit"	Instrumental	0:35
17.	"Victory of Love"	Silambarasan	0:56
18.	"Valla Valla Vallavan"	Blaaze	1:10
19.	"Kadhal Vandhale (Music)"	Instrumental	1:31
20.	"Ilamai Idho + Pothuvaga (Remix)"	Silambarasan	1:45
Total length:			22:40

== Release ==
The film was released on 21 October, during Diwali Festival time, alongside Varalaru, Vattaram, Thalaimagan and Dharmapuri.

=== Critical reception ===
The Hindu wrote: "Vallavan's basic sketch is simpler than Manmadhan, though the maker has lent it his trademark frills". Sify gave 2.5/5 and said: "If you are looking for some wholesome entertainment, then Vallavan is worth your time and money". Lajjavathi of Kalki felt the film is too long and ends abruptly, and the climax is not well told and by trimming here and there Simbu made the charm in first half lose in second half. Cinesouth wrote "Simbu has shown his prowess in his acting, creativity and technology awareness. If only he could reduce his tendency towards vulgarity, he will really make a name for himself as a multi-faceted artiste".

=== Controversies ===
The poster featuring Silambarasan biting Nayanthara's lips was objected by women's organisations.

While filming for Vallavan, Nayanthara was romantically linked with Silambarasan. She initially denied the reports. In November 2006, however, she confirmed that she and Silambarasan had broken up, going on to add that she would not work with him again. However, they later went on to appear in Idhu Namma Aalu (2016). During the making, Reema Sen threatened legal action against Silambarasan after he made changes to the scope of her role in the film. She later stated she regretted her claim and was proud to have won critical acclaim for the character.
