= Thazhuvatha Kaigal =

- Theatrical release poster
- Directed by: R. Sundarrajan
- Written by: R. Sundarrajan
- Produced by: G. Sornambal; R. Ganapathy; Elango Palaniswamy
- Starring: Vijayakanth; Ambika; Anuradha
- Cinematography: Rajarajan
- Edited by: B Krishnakumar; Srinivas
- Music by: Ilaiyaraaja
- Production company: Swarnaambika Movies
- Distributed by: Metro Movies
- Release date: 1 November 1986
- Running time: 139 minutes
- Country: India
- Language: Tamil

Thazhuvatha Kaigal (transl. Hands that never hugged) is a 1986 Indian Tamil-language romantic drama film, written and directed by R. Sundarrajan. The film stars Vijayakanth, Ambika and Anuradha. It was released on 1 November 1986.

== Cast ==
- Vijayakanth
- Ambika as Rajeshwari
- Senthil
- Anuradha
- Jai Ganesh in Guest appearance
- Rajeev in Guest appearance
- Kuladeivam Rajagopal
- V. Gopalakrishnan
- Pasi Narayanan
- Oru Viral Krishna Rao
- Usilai Mani
- Mottai Seetharaman
- Murugesh
- Joker Thulasi
- Charle
- Anu Mohan
- Omakuchi Narasimhan
- Kutty Padmini
- Indira
- Sri Jaya

== Production ==
The song "Poonguil" was shot at Saradha Studios.

== Soundtrack ==
The music was composed by Ilaiyaraaja.

Song	Singers	Lyrics	Length
"Kudumbathai Uruvakka"	Uma Ramanan, S. P. Sailaja, B. S. Sasirekha, Saibaba	Vaali	04:34
"Onna Renda"	P. Jayachandran, S. Janaki	Vaali	04:25
"Poonguil"	S. Janaki	Vaali	04:25
"Thottu Paaru"	P. Jayachandran, S. Janaki	Gangai Amaran	04:17
"Vizhiye"	P. Jayachandran, S. Janaki	Gangai Amaran	04:27
"Naanoru"	Uma Ramanan, B. S. Sasirekha	Vaali	04:30

== Release and reception ==
Thazhuvatha Kaigal was released on 1 November 1986, during Diwali, on the same day as another Vijayakanth film Dharma Devathai. The film was distributed by Metro Movies. Arbi of The Indian Express said Sundarrajan's direction "is thoughtful and even if he does not make box office this time, he has no reason to be disillusioned". Jayamanmadhan of Kalki wrote if Vijayakanth and Ilaiyaraaja were left out, the film is a murky stream with no direction. At the 7th Cinema Express Awards, Ambika received a "special award" for her performance.
