= Sheela Kaur =

Indian actress (born circa 1989)

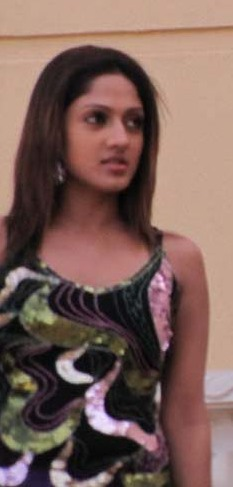
- Born: 1989 or 1990 (age 36–37)
- Occupations: Actress; model
- Years active: 1996–2011; 2018
- Spouse: Santhosh Reddy (m. 2020)

Sheela Kaur is a former Indian actress who has starred in several Telugu and Tamil films along with a few Malayalam and Kannada films. She is known for her performances in Nandhaa, Adhurs, Parugu and Veerasamy.

== Career ==
When she was casually walking to school, she was spotted by the crew of the film Rajakumaran who chose her for the role of younger version of Nadhiya as she resembled her.

== Personal life ==
On 12 March 2020, Kaur married businessman named Santhosh Reddy in Chennai.

== Filmography ==
Year	Film	Role	Language	Notes
1994	Rajakumaran	Young Vaidehi	Tamil	Child artist
1995	Ayudha Poojai	Sumathi	Tamil	Child artist
1996	Poove Unakkaga	Meena	Tamil	Child artist
1997	Surya Vamsam	Vasantha's daughter	Tamil	Child artist
1997	Rettai Jadai Vayasu	Sheela	Tamil	Child artist
1998	Golmaal	Aishwarya's niece	Tamil	Child artist
1998	Unnidathil Ennai Koduthen	Radha's niece	Tamil	Child artist
1999	Maya	Jayasurya	Tamil	Child artist
1999	Jayasoorya	Jayasurya	Kannada	Child artist
2001	Nandhaa	Chitra	Tamil	Child artist
2001	Dheena	Priya	Tamil	Child artist
2001	Dumm Dumm Dumm	Ganga's Sister	Tamil	Child artist
2002	Unnai Ninaithu	Radha's sister	Tamil	Child artist
2006	Seethakoka Chiluka	Lakshmi	Telugu	
2007	Veerasamy	Senthamizh	Tamil	
2007	Raju Bhai	Anjali	Telugu	
2007	Cheena Thaana 001	Priya	Tamil	
2007	Hello Premistara	Nandini	Telugu	
2007	Kanna	Annapooranii Raghunathan	Tamil	
2008	Vedha	Vedha	Tamil	
2008	Parugu	Meenakshi Neelakantam	Telugu	
2008	Mayabazar	Maya	Malayalam	
2009	Maska	Manju Simhachalam	Telugu	
2009	Prem Kahani	Sandhya	Kannada	
2010	Adhurs	Nandhu	Telugu	
2010	Thanthonni	Helen	Malayalam	
2010	Makeup Man	Surya	Malayalam	
2011	Parama Veera Chakra	Sheila	Telugu	
2018	Hyper	Bhanumathi	Kannada	
