= Pettredutha Pillai =

- Title card
- Directed by: Poornachandran
- Written by: T. Rajendar
- Produced by: Usha Rajendar
- Starring: Saravanan; Chithra; Rohini
- Cinematography: Vipindas
- Edited by: P. R. Shanmugam
- Music by: T. Rajendar
- Production company: Chimbu Cine Arts
- Release date: 10 April 1993
- Country: India
- Language: Tamil

Pettredutha Pillai (transl. Biological son) is a 1993 Indian Tamil-language drama film directed by Poornachandran, with lyrics, music and story by T. Rajendar. The film starred Saravanan and Chithra with an extensive cast, which also featured Rajendar's two sons, Silambarasan and Kuralarasan. The film was released on 10 April 1993.

== Cast ==
- Saravanan as Saravanan
- Chithra
- Rohini as Vaidehi
- Pandiyan
- Silambarasan as Kumaran
  - Kuralarasan as young Kumaran
- Mohankumar
- Sithara as Kalyani
- Vennira Aadai Moorthy
- Vadivukkarasi
- Gandhimathi
- Vasuki
- Kumarimuthu
- Oru Viral Krishna Rao
- Ponnambalam

== Soundtrack ==
Soundtrack was composed by T. Rajendar who also wrote lyrics for all songs.

Track listing
No.	Title	Singer(s)	Length
1.	"Komatha"	K. S. Chithra
2.	"Paattu Onnu"	K. S. Chithra
3.	"Pethavale"	Minmini
4.	"Petha Manam"	K. J. Yesudas

== Reception ==
Malini Mannath of The Indian Express wrote, "Petredutha Pillai [..] has all trappings of a T. Rajender film. The treatment is not very subtle, the artistes over react and the film is prosy."
