= Mythili Ennai Kaathali =

1986 film by T. Rajendar

- Poster
- Directed by: T. Rajendar
- Written by: T. Rajendar
- Produced by: Usha Rajendar
- Starring: T. Rajendar; Srividya; Amala
- Cinematography: T. Rajendar
- Edited by: K. R. Ramalingam
- Music by: T. Rajendar
- Production company: Thanjai Cine Arts
- Release date: 4 February 1986
- Country: India
- Language: Tamil

Mythili Ennai Kaathali (transl. Mythili, Love Me) is a 1986 Indian Tamil-language romantic drama film written, directed and scored by T. Rajendar. The film stars Rajendar, Srividya and Amala in her feature debut. It was released on 4 February 1986.

== Plot ==
Manikkam loves Mythili, but it turns out to be a one-sided love. He admires a story writer whose name is also Mythili. She falls in love with him after knowing about his personal tragedies.

== Cast ==
- T. Rajendar as Manickam
- Srividya
- Amala as Mythili
- Sangeetha Raman as Mythili, Manickam's niece
- Y. Vijaya as Kanaka
- Vennira Aadai Moorthy
- S. S. Chandran
- Senthamarai (guest appearance)
- Usilai Mani
- Sivaraman
- Nagaraja Chozhan
- Thyagu
- Suresh Chakravarthy
- Silambarasan as a girl in the song "Ada Ponana Manasey" (uncredited)

== Production ==
Mythili Ennai Kaathali is the feature film debut of Amala. She was cast as Rajendar wanted a trained classical dancer in that role.

== Soundtrack ==
The music was composed by T. Rajendar who also wrote the songs. The song "Oru Ponmaanai" is set in the raga Bowli. The song "En Aasai Mythiliye" was later remixed by Yuvan Shankar Raja in Manmadhan (2004). It also served as an inspiration for the making of the song Kanimaa from the 2025 Tamil feature film Retro (film).

Song	Singers
"Ada Ponnaana Manase"	T. Rajendar
"Engum Mythili"	S. P. Balasubrahmanyam
"En Aasai Mythiliye"	T. Rajendar, Chorus
"Kanneeril Moolgum"	S. P. Balasubrahmanyam, S. Janaki
"Mayil Vanthu"	S. P. Balasubrahmanyam
"Paavaadai"	Malaysia Vasudevan
"Oru Ponmaanai"	S. P. Balasubrahmanyam
"Rakkaala Velaiyila"	S. P. Balasubrahmanyam, S. Janaki
"Saareeram"	S. P. Balasubrahmanyam
"Thaneerile"	S. P. Balasubrahmanyam
"Naanum Undhan"	S. P. Balasubrahmanyam

== Release and reception ==
Mythili Ennai Kaathali was released on 4 February 1986. Jayamanmadhan of Kalki criticised the editing, dances and art direction, feeling that if the multitasking Rajendar handled them too the film may have come better. Rajendar won the Cinema Express Award for Best Music Director – Tamil.
