= Oru Vasantha Geetham =

- Theatrical release poster
- Directed by: T. Rajendar
- Written by: T. Rajendar
- Produced by: C. P. Kantha; Usha Rajendar
- Starring: T. Rajendar; Gautami
- Cinematography: T. Rajendar
- Edited by: P. R. Shanmugam
- Music by: T. Rajendar
- Production companies: Chimbu Cine Arts; Shri Mishri Productions
- Release date: 5 May 1994
- Country: India
- Language: Tamil

Oru Vasantha Geetham (transl. A Breezy Duet) is a 1994 Indian Tamil-language film written and directed by T. Rajendar who also composed the music. Rajender himself appeared in the lead role with Gautami. The film was released on 4 May 1994.

== Cast ==
- T. Rajendar
- Silambarasan as Silambhu
- Gautami
- Radha Ravi
- Silk Smitha
- Kuralarasan as young Silambhu
- Vennira Aadai Moorthy
- Janagaraj
- S. S. Chandran
- Rocky
- Vasu Vikram
- C. K. Saraswathi
- Gandhimathi
- Oru Viral Krishna Rao

== Soundtrack ==
The soundtrack was composed by T. Rajender who also wrote lyrics.

Track listing
No.	Title	Singer(s)	Length
1.	"Aangaari"	S. P. Balasubrahmanyam
2.	"Kalyanam"	S. P. Balasubrahmanyam
3.	"Mainave"	S. P. Balasubrahmanyam
4.	"Puguntha Veedu"	S. P. Balasubrahmanyam
5.	"Thanneerindri"	K. S. Chithra
6.	"Thotta Chinungi"	S. P. Balasubrahmanyam, K. S. Chithra
7.	"Thenpodhigai"	S. P. Balasubrahmanyam

== Legacy ==
The scene where Rajendar's character argues with Gautami in court attained popularity for Rajendar's English dialogue: "Sorry for the interruption. This is only my introduction. During the cross examination, you will see my action-cum-direction, added with perfection. In the name of the witness, you are playing with imitation. That’s my conception".
