= Oru Thayin Sabhatham =

- Theatrical release poster
- Directed by: T. Rajendar
- Screenplay by: T. Rajendar
- Based on: Meri Jung by Javed Akhtar
- Produced by: T. Rajendar
- Starring: T. Rajendar
- Cinematography: T. Rajendar
- Edited by: K. Ramalingam
- Music by: T. Rajendar
- Production company: Chimbu Cine Arts
- Release date: 14 April 1987
- Country: India
- Language: Tamil

Oru Thayin Sabhatham (transl. A mother's vow) is a 1987 Indian Tamil-language legal drama film written, directed, scored and produced by T. Rajendar. He appeared in the lead role with Srividya, whilst the film featured an extensive cast, which includes Rajendar's son Silambarasan. It is a remake of the 1985 Hindi film Meri Jung, and is the only remake Rajendar ever directed. The film was released on 14 April 1987 and became a success.

== Plot ==
SR is a successful criminal lawyer who consistently wins his cases by manipulating court proceedings to his advantage. In one such case, he conspires with some criminals to frame an innocent man named Thyagarajan for murder, resulting in his death penalty. Thyagarajan's wife, Srividya, and their two children, a son and a daughter, plead with SR, but to no avail. After Thyagarajan's execution, Srividya disappears and is presumed dead.

The two children are adopted by a kind-hearted lawyer and raised as his own. Years later, the son grows up to become Rajkumar, a successful lawyer in his own right. Meanwhile, SR's spoiled son, Madhu, becomes classmates with Rajkumar's sister.

Rajkumar takes on a case defending an innocent doctor, Subhadra, who was framed for murder by SR's associates. Rajkumar wins the case and Subhadra is released, angering SR. Rajkumar befriends Subhadra's husband, Dr. Ravi, who helps him discover that his mother is alive and living in a psychiatric hospital.

Madhu hatches a plan to seduce and betray Rajkumar's sister as revenge against Rajkumar. She falls for Madhu and plans to elope with him, but their classmate Vanitha, who was already betrayed by Madhu, rescues her. Enraged, Madhu kills Vanitha and is framed for her murder. Rajkumar defends Madhu in court and proves him guilty, resulting in a death sentence.

SR plans to kill Rajkumar and his mother, but Srividya, who is revealed to be alive, shoots and kills SR outside the court premises.

== Cast ==
- T. Rajendar as Rajkumar
- Srividya as Rajkumar's mother
- Jaishankar as Thyagarajan
- V. Gopalakrishnan (cameo appearance)
- Vennira Aadai Moorthy as Moorthy
- S. S. Chandran as Jr Lawyer
- Nizhalgal Ravi as Dr. Ravi
- Thyagu as Jr Lawyer
- Charuhasan
- Senthamarai as SR
- Venu Arvind (cameo appearance)
- Babloo Prithiveeraj as Madhu
- Mekala
- Kutty Padmini as Subhadra
- Silambarasan (child artist) as a baby in two songs
- Ilakiya as a baby in two songs

== Soundtrack ==
The soundtrack was composed by T. Rajender who also wrote the lyrics for all songs.

Track listing
| No. | Title | Singer(s) | Length |
|---|---|---|---|
| 1. | "Ada Kathalicha Pothathu" | S. P. Balasubrahmanyam |
| 2. | "Ammadiyo Aathadiyo" | S. P. Balasubrahmanyam, Dr. Kalyanam |
| 3. | "Dharmanthan Jeyikkumunga" | Malaysia Vasudevan, Vidya |
| 4. | "Enathu Ganam Un" | K. J. Yesudas, S. Janaki |
| 5. | "Jadhigal Sollida.. Enathu Ganam Un" | S. P. Balasubrahmanyam |
| 6. | "Magane Nee Uranga" | Vidya |
| 7. | "Raakozhi Koovayile" | S. P. Balasubrahmanyam, Uma Ramanan |
| 8. | "Saaral Kaathuladhan" | S. P. Balasubrahmanyam, Uma Ramanan |
| 9. | "Sollamathane Intha" | S. P. Balasubrahmanyam, K. S. Chithra |

== Release and reception ==
Oru Thayin Sabatham was released on 14 April 1987. According to an article by Sreedhar Pillai in India Today, the film was sold for ₹50 lakh (equivalent to ₹5.7 crore or US$590,000 in 2023) and it did business worth over ₹80 lakh (equivalent to ₹9.2 crore or US$950,000 in 2023). N. Krishnaswamy of The Indian Express wrote, "Rajendar is a talented man, but he should bridle his overbearing ambitions. He should learn to serve the ends of cinema with humility." A reviewer for Kalki found Rajendar's dialogues in court laughable but felt they would be applauded by the actor's fans. The reviewer criticised the climactic fight sequence as a waste of budget, as well as S. S. Chandran's comedy.
