= Moondrezhuthil En Moochirukkum =

- Poster
- Directed by: Manobala
- Written by: Liaquat Ali Khan (dialogue)
- Screenplay by: Manobala
- Story by: M. S. Madhu
- Produced by: V. N. Selvaraj; K . K. Balasubramaniyan
- Starring: Vijayakanth; Rupini
- Cinematography: Rajarajan
- Edited by: G. Jayachandran
- Music by: Ilayagangai
- Production company: Seranaadu Movie Creations
- Release date: 5 November 1991
- Running time: 125 minutes
- Country: India
- Language: Tamil

Moondrezhuthil En Moochirukkum (transl. My breath lies in three letters) is a 1991 Indian Tamil-language romantic action drama film directed by Manobala. The film stars Vijayakanth and Rupini, with newcomers Srinivas Varma and Geetha Vijayan, Anandaraj, Thilakan, Mansoor Ali Khan, Jayabharathi and Sathyapriya playing supporting roles. It was released on 5 November 1991.

== Plot ==
Robert was an orphan child living on the street. He was adopted by a poor couple who had one child and grew up working in his adoptive father's carpentry workshop. Many years later, Robert became a carpenter who makes coffins in Nagercoil and works hard to support his family. His adoptive father has died; his brother Peter studies in Chennai; and Robert lives with his adoptive mother Mary. After passing the higher secondary examination, Peter returns home to his family.

In Nagercoil, Peter meets his childhood friend Stella, who is also studying in Chennai. They slowly fall in love with each other. Stella has a brother, Amirtharajah, a wicked man who does not hesitate to kill his enemies. Amirtharajah is also an influential figure and the wealthiest man in Nagercoil. When Amirtharajah realizes that his sister is in love with a boy from an underprivileged background, he and his henchmen beat up Peter. Robert helps the two lovers and explains to Amirtharajah that he would arrange their marriage at any cost. Amirtharajah then forces every wood supplier to stop selling to Robert's shop in order to prevent Robert from making coffins. However, Robert continues to challenge Amirtharajah.

Amirtharajah offers to pay in exchange for leaving his sister, and Robert surprisingly accepts the deal. Peter is crazy with anger about his brother's decision and insults Robert badly, but the latter stays calm. Robert wins an auction that featured wood and pays for it with Amirtharajah's money. He then sends the wood to Amirtharajah's home to teach Amirtharajah a lesson. After the auction, Robert tells his brother that in the past, he was love with a woman named Parvathy, but her father Namboodiri refused to allow the marriage because of Robert's religion and social status, eventually killing Parvathy when Robert persisted. Robert promises his brother that he would give his life to arrange his marriage with Stella.

== Cast ==
- Vijayakanth as Robert
- Rupini as Parvathy Namboodiri
- Srinivas Varma as Peter
- Geetha Vijayan as Stella
- Anandaraj as Amirtharajah
- Thilakan as Namboodiri
- Mansoor Ali Khan as Moses
- Jayabharathi as Mary
- Sathyapriya as Rosey
- Vennira Aadai Moorthy as Doctor
- T. K. S. Chandran
- Usilaimani
- Pasi Narayanan
- Kullamani
- J.K.
- Master Vikram Babu as young Robert
- Master Santhosh as young Peter
- Baby Srilekha as young Stella
- Ponnambalam

== Soundtrack ==
The music was composed by Ilayagangai, with lyrics written by Kalidasan.

Song	Singer(s)	Duration
"Pottu Vachcha Poove"	S. P. Balasubrahmanyam, Uma Ramanan, Gogulanan	5:11
"Sandana Kili Rendu"	K. J. Yesudas, K. S. Chithra	4:11
"Odam Ondru"	Mano, K. S. Chithra	4:02
"Aagayam Kondadum" (Happy)	K. J. Yesudas, P. Susheela	5:39
"Aagayam Kondadum" (Sad)	K. J. Yesudas	5:20
"Ullasa Theru"	Mano, K. S. Chithra, Mayilswamy	4:29
"Vaanam Chollum"	Minmini	5:05

== Critical reception ==
The Indian Express wrote, "Clichéd scriptline gets a new shape in this Vijayakanth starrer with an attempt to place characters in life-like situations".
