= Sabash Babu =

- Theatrical release poster
- Directed by: Sasi Mohan
- Screenplay by: T. Rajendar
- Story by: P. Sankara Narayanan
- Produced by: S. R. M.
- Starring: Silambarasan; Heera Rajagopal; Mansoor Ali Khan
- Cinematography: V. Ramesh
- Edited by: M. V. Natarajan
- Music by: T. Rajendar
- Production company: S. R. M. Arts Productions
- Release date: 13 November 1993
- Running time: 147 minutes
- Country: India
- Language: Tamil

Sabash Babu (/səbɑːʃ bɑːbʊ/ transl. Bravo Babu) is a 1993 Indian Tamil-language action drama film written by T. Rajendar from a story by P. Sankara Narayanan and directed by Sasi Mohan. The films stars Silambarasan appearing in the title role as a child artiste. Heera Rajagopal and Mansoor Ali Khan played supporting roles. The film was released on 13 November 1993.

== Plot ==
Lalitha is tortured by her relatives and made insane to take over her whole property. The rest of the film shows how her son Babu saves his mother with the help of his father Veluchamy, an army officer.

== Cast ==
- Silambarasan as Babu
- Heera Rajagopal as Lalitha
- Mansoor Ali Khan
- Ilavarasi
- Raja Ravindra
- Shenbagam
- Senthil
- Vennira Aadai Moorthy
- Omakuchi Narasimhan as Cook
- Kumarimuthu as Priest
- Oru Viral Krishna Rao
- Rajappa
- Vishwanath
- T. Rajendar as Veluchamy (guest appearance)
- Disco Shanti (cameo appearance)
- Silk Smitha (cameo appearance)
- Kuralarasan as young Babu (cameo appearance in the song "Maane Marikozhundhe")

== Soundtrack ==
The soundtrack was composed by T. Rajender, who also wrote the songs.

Track listing
No.	Title	Singer(s)	Length
1.	"Maane Marikozhundhe" (male)	K. J. Yesudas
2.	"Maane Marikozhundhe" (female)	K. S. Chithra
3.	"Podiyannu"	K. S. Chithra
4.	"Aapathuku"	S. P. Balasubrahmanyam
5.	"Thottukava"	S. Janaki

== Reception ==
Malini Mannath of The Indian Express wrote the film "is yet another attempt of T. Rajendar to project his son as alter ego". Kalki gave a negative review for the film.
