= Veerasamy =

2007 film by T. Rajendar

- Title card
- Directed by: Vijaya T. Rajender
- Written by: Vijaya T. Rajendar
- Produced by: Vijaya T. Rajendar
- Starring: Vijaya T. Rajendar; Mumtaj; Sheela Kaur
- Cinematography: Vijaya T. Rajendar
- Edited by: J. N. Harsha
- Music by: Vijaya T. Rajendar
- Production company: Chimbu Cini Arts
- Release date: 2 February 2007
- Country: India
- Language: Tamil

Veerasamy (/viːrɑːsɑːmi/) is a 2007 Indian Tamil-language masala film written, produced, scored and directed by Vijaya T. Rajender who also stars alongside Mumtaj and Meghna Naidu.

== Plot ==
Veerasamy is a lawyer, party leader and MLA in Chennai. He tries to do good things for people. His sister Senthamizh falls in love with a pimp's brother, and a neighbour Sarasu falls in love with Veerasamy.

Even though Sarasu's family background and the job she does like selling black ticket in the theatre is against his ideology, he still accepts her to work in his house which she wishfully volunteers but she constantly flirts with him. In one confrontation she confesses her love towards him which he refuses and on anger she tells him that she cannot live without him, fearing she would go to some extreme measures he gets her to promise not to attempt suicide which she agrees.

Later Veerasamy learns that his sister is in love with his arche nemesis brother and does not agree with their love and he doesn't speak to her. Frustrated she breaks up with him. To prove his love towards her he goes to her house to meet her but is eventually caught by her brother and he starts to hit him. Fearing that his brother would kill him she asks him to leave but he insists that he needs to prove that he is worthy of Veerasamy's sister. Convinced, he agrees to the marriage and goes to the boy's house to talk about the marriage. However, they are greeted by the arrogant sister who tells them that the marriage will only happen when Veerasamy falls to her legs and begs her to forgive him in front of the court. Furious, Veerasamy's sister tells that her brother is the most important and precious person to her that she can even live without the love of her life but she cannot bear to humiliate her brother and tells everyone that she isn't interested in marriage.

Later, Sarasu family who only cares about money sells their daughter to a druggie in exchange for souvenir. She abuses her by constantly tormenting her. Veerasamy is filled with guilt, and it is revealed that he was also secretly in love with her. At some point, the druggie sells her to another man and asks her to sleep with him. Frustrated she kills her husband and comes to Veerasamy crying.

Meanwhile, when this was happening Veerasamy sister wants her brother to look for a groom for marriage as it will make the pain bearable. He looks for a groom and also tells them about her previous love life which they didn't mind much. Later, learning that the pimps brother gets frustrated and the girl who was also the one side lover of his who was ironically the one who plotting schemes to separate both of them couldn't bear to see him in this state. So, they visit Veerasamy, and she confesses and pleads him to get his sister to marry him. He also weeps saying that he has already arranged for a groom for his sister and their reception is today. At the same time Sarasu comes to see Veerasamy and confesses to him that she had killed her husband. Overwhelming with guilt, Veerasamy who also witnessed how painful it was to not be living with your soulmate allows his sister to marry her lover.

The groom's parents who were furious confront him. During this confrontation, the family used some harsh words which made him feel very ashamed to the point where he literally loses his life unable to bear their venomous words sprouting out of their tongue. Later Sarasu realises that Veerasamy is dead unable to bear the shock she loses her life fainting breaking her anklet. This proves her love towards him and how she immediately left the world when he left. The film ends with both of their demises and a weeping Veerasamy's sister.

== Cast ==
- Vijaya T. Rajender as Veerasamy
- Mumtaj as Sarasu
- Sheela Kaur as Senthamizh
- Meghna Naidu
- Santhanam as Veerasamy's friend
- M. S. Bhaskar as Advocate
- Aziz as Arun, Senthamizh's lover
- Vennira Aadai Moorthy as Avasarakudukkai Arunachalam
- Charu Haasan
- Sharmili as Nylon Nalina (Sarasu's stepmother)
- Padma Narayanan as Rousu Rani
- S. N. Parvathy
- Sharmili
- Pandu
- Madhan Bob as Fraud
- Bobby as Minister
- Kottachi
- Benjamin
- Alex
- Muthukaalai
- Bonda Mani
- Cool Suresh
- Bava Lakshmanan
- Citizen Mani
- Vichu Vishwanath
- Kili Ramchandran
- Winner Ramachandran
- Kadhal Sukumar
- Poochi Senthil
- Thenali
- Bayilvan Ranganathan as Traffic Police Officer (uncredited role)

== Music ==
The music was composed by T. Rajendar who also wrote the lyrics.

Song	Singers	Length
"Oru Vennilavu"	Prasanna, Amrutha	05:41
"Hallo Kadhal"	Silambarasan, Premgi Amaren	03:17
"Vadi En Kadhal"	Manicka Vinayagam	05:07
"Yelelo Veerasamy"	Vijaya T. Rajendar	04:36
"Madhana Kama Rasa"	Mathangi	05:34
"Sollaiye Kadhal"	Vijaya T. Rajendar	03:37
"Dai Dai Dai I Love You"	Febi Mani	04:12
"Varamparu"	Chandrakanth, Vijaya T. Rajendar	05:53
"Marakka Mudiyale"	Vijaya T. Rajendar	06:36
"Entha Kadhal Pollathathu"	Prasanna	05:07
"Vachirukken"	Vijaya T. Rajendar, Anuradha Sriram	06:22

== Reception ==
Sriram Iyer of Rediff.com wrote, "The story breaks into a song every few minutes and watching Rajendar romancing in his rainbow coloured costumes and clumsy dancing is sure to tickle your funny bone. The action sequences, however, are well choreographed. The movie has a number of monologues of varying durations from Rajendar -- he launches into a soliloquy at the drop of a hat. Making no secret of his political inclinations, Rajendar makes liberal references to his son Simbu, which is totally unrelated to the story". S. R. Ashok Kumar of The Hindu wrote, "Not that the film is devoid of good aspects but they are nullified with Rajendar as the hero". Ananda Vikatan stated that marks could be given to test, but wondered how to give marks to a poisonous test, and refused to give marks to this film. Malini Mannath of Chennai Online wrote, "One can admire TR for his persistence and extreme confidence in handling so many departments. But it's another matter that the result is far from satisfactory and from what he may have intended". Lajjavathi of Kalki wrote that after Imsai Arasan 23rd Pulikecei, this film gave the satisfaction of watching a full-length comedy film.
