= En Thangai Kalyani =

- Poster
- Directed by: T. Rajendar
- Written by: T. Rajendar
- Produced by: T. Rajendar
- Starring: T. Rajendar; Sudha
- Cinematography: T. Rajendar
- Edited by: K. R. Shanmugam
- Music by: T. Rajendar
- Production company: Chimbu Cine Arts
- Release date: 5 February 1988
- Country: India
- Language: Tamil

En Thangai Kalyani (transl. My sister Kalyani) is a 1988 Indian Tamil-language drama film written, directed and produced by T. Rajendar. Rajender appeared in the lead role, with Sudha. The film featured Rajendar's real life children including his son Silambarasan. It was released on 5 February 1988. Silambarasan won the Best Child Artist award at the 10th Cinema Express Awards.

== Plot ==
A man deserts his wife and his two children, Velu and Kalyani, to live with his concubine. He marries her and lives with her without taking care of his wife and children. Velu grows up with a hatred of his father. He loves sister Kalyani very much and buys everything for her. He sends her to college, but she falls in love with her co-student Kannan against the wishes of her brother and mother. Kannan turns out to be a fraud who does anything for money. Velu tries to warn Kalyani, but she elopes with Kannan and marries him. Months later, Velu finds out that his sister is ill-treated by Kannan, who is now living with a dancer. He is ready to do anything for the dancer. Kalyani becomes pregnant, and her mother meets her secretly without her son's knowledge. Soon, Kalyani has a son named Chimbu. Velu is very affectionate to his nephew but does not show it outside. Howvever, he does not speak to Kalyani and says he will never forgive her.

Meanwhile, Velu's father was ill-treated by his concubine, who is now his wife. She kept him alive only for his property. She sleeps with another person, and Velu's father finds out. He confronts her and she, with the help of her men, beats him and forces him to sign the stamp paper, thereby getting hold of all his property and kicks him out of the home. He comes to visit his ex-wife, who invites him with pleasure and provides him with food. When Velu finds about it, he became furious and asks his father to leave. Velu's mother, unwilling to let her husband go alone, leaves along with him.

Kannan's friend comes to Kalyani's home and expresses his desire to sleep with her. She beats him with a broomstick. He in turn asks Kannan to leave the dancer's home, but he agrees for his desire saying that living with the dancer means everything to him. He tricks Kalyani and takes her to his club, where the men try to rape her. Velu comes for her rescue. He manages to shoot one of them and spares Kannan, only to be shot by the dying guy whom he shot earlier. He dies, and Kalyani also dies immediately.

== Cast ==
- T. Rajendar as Velu
- Sudha Swarnalakshmi as Kalyani
- Srividya as Velu and Kalyani's mother
- Senthamarai as Velu and Kalyani's father
- Vigdass as Kannan
- Silambarasan as Chimbu, Kalyani's son
- S. S. Chandran as Meenatchi's father
- Thyagu as Meenatchi's brother
- Vennira Aadai Moorthy
- Renuka
- Y. Vijaya
- Prameela
- Pasi Narayanan
- Oru Viral Krishna Rao
- Usilai Mani
- Ganeshkar as Young Velu
- Thamizh Ilakkiya as Young Kalyani
- Baby Aarthi
- Ratnamala
- Vadivelu as Cyclist (cameo; uncredited)

== Soundtrack ==
The soundtrack was written and composed by T. Rajendar.

Track listing
No.	Title	Singer(s)	Length
1.	"Degam Suduguthu Vaadi"	S. P. Balasubrahmanyam, K. S. Chithra	05:20
2.	"Ellaame En Thangachi"	K. S. Chithra	04:27
3.	"Poo Ontru Valarthen"	S. P. Balasubrahmanyam	03:23
4.	"Poo Vaangi Vantha Neram"	S. P. Balasubrahmanyam	04:39
5.	"Poottaane Moonu Mudichithan"	S. P. Balasubrahmanyam, B. S. Sasirekha	05:37
6.	"Thanandhani Kaatukulla"	S. P. Balasubrahmanyam, K. S. Chithra	04:46
7.	"Thangachikku Seemantham"	S. P. Balasubrahmanyam	03:05
8.	"Thol Meethu Thaalaatta"	S. P. Balasubrahmanyam	04:38
9.	"Viradathil Naano"	S. P. Balasubrahmanyam, S. Janaki	04:43
Total length:			36:12

== Critical reception ==
Jayamanmadhan of Kalki panned Rajendar for following the same old template and Y. Vijaya for performing the same kind of roles but praised the scenes involving Silambarasan.
