= Thai Thangai Paasam =

1995 film by T. Rajendar

- Directed by: T. Rajendar
- Written by: T. Rajendar
- Produced by: T. Rajendar
- Starring: T. Rajendar; Sithara
- Cinematography: T. Rajendar
- Edited by: P. R. Shanmugam
- Music by: T. Rajendar
- Production company: Thanjai Cine Arts
- Release date: 24 April 1995
- Country: India
- Language: Tamil

Thai Thangai Paasam (transl. Mother, Sister Affection) is a 1995 Indian Tamil-language drama film written, directed and produced by T. Rajendar. He appeared in the lead role alongside Sithara. The film was released on 24 April 1995, received negative reviews from critics, and became a modest success.

== Cast ==
- T. Rajendar as Velu
- Jaishankar
- Jai Ganesh
- Rajeev
- Sanjay
- Silambarasan as Young Velu
- Kuralarasan as Kural
- Ilakiya
- Srividya
- Kavitha
- Sithara
- Subhashri
- Keerthana
- S. S. Chandran
- Vennira Aadai Moorthy
- Idichapuli Selvaraj
- Oru Viral Krishna Rao
- Raghava Lawrence in a special appearance
- Kanal Kannan in a special appearance

== Soundtrack ==
The soundtrack was composed by T. Rajender who also wrote the lyrics.

Track listing
No.	Title	Singer(s)	Length
1.	"Andha Mama"	S. P. Balasubrahmanyam
2.	"Roop Tera"	T. Rajendar, Sangeetha
3.	"Naan Petra Magane"	Sindhu
4.	"Ilamayile"	Suresh Peters, Noyal
5.	"Hey Muniyamma"	Mano, Swarnalatha
6.	"Uthalakkadi Amma"	Usha Rajender, T. Rajender
7.	"Thalattu Padichavale"	S. P. Balasubrahmanyam
