= Santhi Enathu Santhi =

- Title card
- Directed by: T. Rajendar
- Written by: T. Rajendar
- Produced by: T. Rajendar
- Starring: T. Rajendar; Ramesh Babu; Neetha Puri; Silambarasan
- Cinematography: T. Rajendar
- Edited by: P. R. Shanmugam
- Music by: T. Rajendar
- Production company: Chimbu Cine Arts
- Release date: 18 April 1991
- Country: India
- Language: Tamil

Santhi Enathu Santhi (transl. Santhi, My Santhi) is a 1991 Indian Tamil language film, written, directed and produced by T. Rajendar. He also stars with Telugu actor Ramesh Babu and Neetha Puri. The film was released on 18 April 1991. Silambarasan won the Best Child Artiste award at the 12th Cinema Express Awards.

== Cast ==
- T. Rajendar
- Ramesh Babu as Raja (voice dubbed by Achamillai Gopi)
- Radha as Santhi (cameo appearance)
- Neetha Puri
- Silambarasan as Babu
- Vennira Aadai Moorthy
- Disco Shanti
- Chakravarthy as Chakravarthy (voice dubbed by Nassar)
- Ali
- Y. Vijaya
- Ilakiya (uncredited cameo appearance)

== Soundtrack ==
The soundtrack was composed by T. Rajendar, who also wrote the lyrics.

Track listing
No.	Title	Singer(s)	Length
1.	"Idhazhgal Urasum"	Mano
2.	"Poomele Kadhal"	Mano
3.	"En Uyirin Uyire"	S. P. Balasubrahmanyam
4.	"Onnu Rendu"	S. Janaki
5.	"Sundhariyin Raangi"	Mano
6.	"Ye Raasa"	S. Janaki
7.	"Ponna Follow"	Mano
8.	"En Uyir Nee" (sad)	S. P. Balasubrahmanyam
9.	"Idhazhgal Urasum Theme"	Latha Malathi
