= Uravai Kaatha Kili =

- Theatrical release poster
- Directed by: T. Rajendar
- Written by: T. Rajendar
- Produced by: R. Danalakshmi
- Starring: T. Rajendar; Saritha; Jeevitha; Major Sundarrajan
- Cinematography: T. Rajendar
- Edited by: R. Devarajan
- Music by: T. Rajendar
- Production company: Thanjai Cini Arts
- Release date: 23 October 1984
- Running time: 155 minutes
- Country: India
- Language: Tamil

Uravai Kaatha Kili (transl. The parrot which protected the relationship) is a 1984 Indian Tamil-language film written and directed by T. Rajendar. The film stars Rajendar, Saritha, Jeevitha and Major Sundarrajan. It marked the first screen appearance of Rajendar's son Silambarasan. The film was released on 23 October 1984, during Diwali.

== Cast ==
- T. Rajendar in a dual role as Bhaskar and Chinnathambi
- Saritha as Valli
- Jeevitha as Kuzhandhai
- Major Sundarrajan
- S. S. Chandran
- Usilai Mani
- Sivaraman
- Pushpalatha
- Gandhimathi
- Sangeetha
- Silambarasan as Silambarasu
- Typist Gopu
- Viji

== Production ==
Uravai Kaatha Kili marked the first screen appearance of Rajendar's son Silambarasan.

== Soundtrack ==
The music was composed by Rajendar who also wrote the lyrics.

Song	Singers	Length
"Intha Malligai Manasai"	Janaki	04:57
"Adangoppan Mavane"	T. Rajendar	04:12
"Enthan Paadalgalil"	K. J. Yesudas, B. S. Sasirekha	05:01
"Powrnami Nilavenna"	S. P. Balasubrahmanyam, Janaki	04:28
"Pakkathil Vanthaal"	S. P. Balasubrahmanyam Janaki	04.36

== Reception ==
Jayamanmadhan of Kalki gave a mixed review, saying the film had too many advices and Rajendar's dual roles was fine but he should not make in such a way that only his fans should come and watch and also found his songs to be okay.
