= Enga Veetu Velan =

- Poster
- Directed by: T. Rajendar
- Written by: T. Rajendar
- Produced by: T. Rajendar
- Starring: Rajeev; Rekha; Silambarasan
- Cinematography: T. Rajendar
- Edited by: P. R. Shanmugam
- Music by: T. Rajendar
- Production company: Chimbu Cine Arts
- Release date: 10 April 1992
- Country: India
- Language: Tamil

Enga Veetu Velan (transl. Velan from our house) is a 1992 Indian Tamil-language film written, directed and produced by T. Rajendar. The film stars Rajender's son Silambarasan in the title role with Rajeev and Rekha in supporting roles. It was released on 10 April 1992, and completed a 100-day run.

== Plot ==
Arun is married to Kalyani, but has an affair with Paapu which leads to Arun disowning Kalyani and their son Velan. Arun in fact does not agree that Velan was born to him. Arun brings Paapu and her family to his house. Paapu is a money minded woman who has affair with many men. Kalyani stays separately with Velan but remains as a maid doing household stuffs in Arun's home. Velan decides to play tricks to unite his parents for which he plans to reveal the true identity of Paapu and her family to Arun.

Velan tactfully plans and Arun gets to know that Paapu and her family has been looting his money without his knowledge which makes him furious. Paapu decides to run away from Arun's home and decides to start living with another man Jambu. Knowing this, Arun feels betrayed and decides to kill Paapu out of anger. Velan also secretly travels along with Arun in his car to stop him from committing the murder. Arun finds Paapu and Jambu in a hotel and fight ensues between them during which Jambu is shot dead. Police arrest Arun charging him for the murder and Velan is taken to the court as the eyewitness.

Velan informs in court that Jambu is shot dead by Arun but Arun denies that. Arun pleads with Velan to reveal the truth and realises his mistake. Arun also informs everyone that Velan is born to him. Post this, Velan informs the truth in the court. Velan informs that Jambu was killed by Selva, who happens to be the brother of Paapu and the blame was put on Arun. Velan also brings the witness, who happens to be the servant at Arun's home. Post this, Paapu's family has been sentenced to imprisonment and Arun is released. Arun is transformed and accepts Velan and Kalyani.

== Cast ==
- Rajeev as Arun
- Rekha as Kalyani
- Silambarasan as Velan
- V. Gopalakrishnan
- K. S. Selvaraj
- Veera Raghavan as Arun's father
- Vennira Aadai Moorthy
- Oru Viral Krishna Rao
- Kumarimuthu
- Sivaraman
- Sharmili

== Production ==
The film began production in 1991 and media reported that the makers planned to complete it in one stretch.

== Soundtrack ==
The soundtrack was composed by T. Rajender who also wrote lyrics for all songs.

Track listing
No.	Title	Singer(s)	Length
1.	"Paal Kaavadi"	K. S. Chithra
2.	"Veeramani Kandene"	K. S. Chithra
3.	"Naan Potta Sarakku"	S. Janaki
4.	"Chinna Mani Ranga"	K. S. Chithra
