= Kuralarasan =

Indian actor

- Born: T. R. Kuralarasan
- Occupations: Actor; composer
- Years active: 1993–present
- Spouse: Nabeela (m. 2019)
- Children: 1

Kuralarasan born June 3 1991 is an Indian actor and composer who works in Tamil-language films. He has collaborated with his father, T. Rajendar, and his elder brother, Silambarasan, in all his films to date.

== Personal life ==
Kuralarasan is the younger son of T. Rajendar and Usha, and younger brother of Silambarasan.

In February 2019, Kuralarasan's video of shahada (proclamation of faith) embracing Islam with the presence of his parents in a Masjid in Annasalai, Chennai had become viral. Rajender in the press interview stated that Kuralarasan since young years had been passionate about Islam and completely embraced Islam through that proclamation event. Kuralarasan stated that out of his own will being attracted to the principles of Islam had embraced it. He married Nabeela in 2019, and the two have a son born in 2024.

== Career ==
He began his career as a child artist with Pettredutha Pillai (1993) and garnered acclaim for his role in Sonnal Thaan Kaadhala (2001). He made his debut as a music composer with his father's production Idhu Namma Aalu (2016) starring his brother, Silambarasan. He wrote the lyrics for "Oru Thalai Ragam" in addition to rendering his voice for the song "King Kong".

== Filmography ==
Year	Film	Role	Notes
1993	Pettredutha Pillai	Young Kumaran	
1993	Sabash Babu	Young Babu	Cameo appearance
1994	Oru Vasantha Geetham	Young Silambhu	
1995	Thai Thangai Paasam	Kural	
1999	Monisha En Monalisa	Himself	Cameo appearance
2001	Sonnal Thaan Kaadhala	Roja's brother	Won–Tamil Nadu State Film Award for Best Child Artist
2002	Kadhal Azhivathillai	Charmi's brother	
2003	Alai	Gopi	

== Discography ==
Year	Film	Notes
2016	Idhu Namma Aalu	As composer; also playback singer for "King Kong"
