= Samsara Sangeetham =

- Poster
- Directed by: T. Rajendar
- Written by: T. Rajendar
- Produced by: T. Rajendar
- Starring: T. Rajendar; Silambarasan; Ilakiya; Renuka
- Cinematography: T. Rajendar
- Music by: T. Rajendar
- Production company: Simbu Cine Arts
- Release date: 21 July 1989
- Country: India
- Language: Tamil

Samsara Sangeetham is a 1989 Indian Tamil-language film written, directed, produced, photographed and scored by T. Rajendar. He himself stars with his son Silambarasan and daughter Ilakiya alongside Renuka. The film was released on 21 July 1989.

== Plot ==
A married couple, who have a son and a daughter, separate after a fight. The son, Chimbu, stays with the father while the daughter stays with the mother. Chimbu looks for his mother. How the family reunites form the rest of the story.

== Cast ==
- T. Rajendar as Kaalidasan
- Silambarasan as Chimbu
- Ilakiya
- Renuka
- Devipriya
- Vinu Chakravarthy
- Vinoth
- Sivaraman
- Usilai Mani
- Thavil Murugesh
- Charle
- Idichapuli Selvaraj
- Pasi Narayanan
- M. L. A. Thangaraj
- Thyagu
- Joker Thulasi
- Pakoda Kadhar
- C. I. D. Sakunthala
- Prameela
- Kalaiseivi
- Anuradha
- Hema Malini

== Soundtrack ==
The soundtrack was written and composed by T. Rajendar. The song "I am a Little Star" earned Silambarasan fame as a child artist.

Track listing
No.	Title	Singer(s)	Length
1.	"I am a Little Star"	S. Janaki, Chorus
2.	"Santheyga Puyaladicha"	K. J. Yesudas
3.	"Paal Kothicha Pongi"	K. J. Yesudas
4.	"Thanga Katti Pola"	S. P. Balasubrahmanyam
5.	"Samiyoda"	Malaysia Vasudevan, Chorus
6.	"Aararo Thai Pada"	K. J. Yesudas
7.	"Noolu Illa Oosiyila"	K. S. Chithra
8.	"Othayadi Pathaiyila"	S. P. Balasubrahmanyam
9.	"Valli Mayil"	S. P. Balasubrahmanyam, Chorus
10.	"Unakku Kannai Naanirukka"	S. Janaki, S. P. Balasubrahmanyam
11.	"Kankalum Enguthu"	S. P. Balasubrahmanyam
12.	"Chokka Vaikkum Sultana"	S. Janaki, S. P. Balasubrahmanyam
13.	"I Am A Little Star"	S. Janaki, Chorus
