= Kadhal Azhivathillai =

2002 film by T. Rajendran

- Theatrical release poster
- Directed by: T. Rajendar
- Written by: T. Rajendar
- Produced by: T. Rajendar
- Starring: Silambarasan; Charmy Kaur; T. Rajendar
- Cinematography: T. Rajendar
- Edited by: P. R. Shanmugam
- Music by: T. Rajendar
- Production company: Chimbu Cine Arts
- Release date: 4 November 2002
- Running time: 180 minutes
- Country: India
- Language: Tamil

Kadhal Azhivathillai (transl. Love can never be destroyed) is a 2002 Indian Tamil-language romantic action film written, directed and produced by T. Rajendar, who also composed the music and portrayed a supporting role. It stars his son Silambarasan (in his debut as a lead actor) and Charmy Kaur. The film released on 4 November 2002 and was average at the box office.

== Plot ==
Vallavan is elected college chairman after defeating Charmy, the daughter of Ravishankar, a minister. Predictably, the two soon fall for each other, though they never directly reveal it. But when Ravishankar learns of the love affair, he is staunchly against it and is willing to go any distance to make sure that it never succeeds. At Vallavan's house, his father mentally harasses his wife, since he suspects her of having an affair with her ex-lover. Outside the home, Vallavan is helped by Vakkeel Dada, a lawyer who makes sure justice is served, whatever the means.

== Cast ==
- Silambarasan as Chimbu
- Charmy as Charmy
- Prakash Raj as Prakash, Chimbu's father
- Radha Ravi as Union Minister Ravishankar, Charmy's father
- Sachu as Kundhavai, Charmy's grandmother
- Vennira Aadai Moorthy as Rangarajan Iyengar, Charmy's grandfather
- Dhamu as Ravishankar's PA
- V. K. Ramaswamy as Paramasivan
- S. S. Chandran as Deputy PM's PA
- Rohit as Chimbu's friend
- Karunas as Sami
- Pandu as Professor
- Madhan Bob as Principal
- Sudhakar as Ravishankar's Telugu-speaking PA
- AVS as Ravishankar's Telugu-speaking PA
- Ajay Rathnam as police inspector
- Ganga as Guest at Raksha Bandhan event
- Riyaz Khan as Vasanth
- Nalini as Swarnakka, Charmy's mother
- Seetha Parthiban as Subramaniyam, Chimbu's mother
- Monica as Monica
- Y. Vijaya as Parvathy, Charmy's aunt
- Alphonsa (special appearance in "Pilaiyar Suzhi")
- Sukumar as Chimbu's friend
- Kottachi as college student
- Benjamin as college student
- Bonda Mani as Vakkeel Dada's henchman
- Kovai Senthil (credited as Senthil)
- Cool Suresh as Vallavan's friend
- Rathan as Deputy CM
- A. Veerappan
- T. Rajendar as Vakkeel Dada (director)
- Kuralarasan as Kumaran, Charmy's brother

Uncredited

- Santhanam as Aravind, Chimbu's friend
- Vengal Rao

== Production ==
T. Rajendar announced that his son Silambarasan would play the lead role in Kadhal Azhivathillai in late 2001. After failing to find a suitable lead actress to appear opposite Silambarasan, Rajender postponed the project and went on to make Sonnal Thaan Kaadhala (2001). Vadivelu's brother, Jagatheeshwaran, played a role in the film. Two songs "Clinton Magalo" and "En Manathil" were shot at Switzerland while the song "Maara Maara" was shot at seven sets.

== Soundtrack ==
The music was composed by T. Rajendar who also wrote the lyrics.

Song	Singers	Length
"Pilaiyar Suzhi"	Shankar Mahadevan	06:32
"Paarkadha Podhu Podhu"	P. Unnikrishnan, Silambarasan	06:08
"Kadhal Azhivathilai"	S. P. Balasubrahmanyam	06:51
"Jothikava"	Silambarasan	05:01
"Clinton Magalo"	Silambarasan	06:40
"Maara Maara"	Tippu, Anupama	06:24
"Evanthan"	S. P. Balasubrahmanyam	05:47
"En Manasil"	Prasanna Rao, Srivardhini	06:09

== Reception ==
The film was released on 4 November 2002 on Diwali day. Malini Mannath of Chennai Online wrote "This rich guy-poor girl romance, set against a college campus backdrop is narrated in the director's expected, inimitable style". S. R. Ashok Kumar of The Hindu wrote "The story line has nothing innovative to offer in terms of content". Sify wrote "This is the launch vehicle of Silambarasan the ?Little star? of yesterday who is touted as ?Little Superstar? by his father T. Rajendar who has produced and directed film Kathal Azhivathillai. The film has been made to showcase Silambarasan?s many talents (?). In spite of all this and loud boasting, the film is a slur on the audience thinking capability. Does T. Rajendar think that the audience are dumb and ignoramus?". Cinesouth wrote "It makes you wonder why T Rajinder was making all that noise about a dud film like that. That's what 'Kaadhal Azhivathillai' makes you feel. T Rajinder is under this illusion that as long as his son dances and fights well, he can make it big in the industry. He cares so much about his son. He didn't even give a thought about the poor viewer. You get the distinct feeling of having watched a dubbed third rated Telugu film to add to the effect there are Y.Vijaya and Sudhakaran in the film! There is a song after every 10 minutes. The length of the songs and Silambarasan's interval-less dance makes them a tiresome affair".
