= Monisha En Monalisa =

- Title card
- Directed by: T. Rajendar
- Written by: T. Rajendar
- Produced by: T. Rajendar
- Starring: Ramankanth; Mumtaj
- Cinematography: T. Rajendar
- Edited by: P. R. Shanmugam
- Music by: T. Rajendar
- Production company: Chimbu Cine Arts
- Release date: 12 April 1999
- Country: India
- Language: Tamil

Monisha En Monalisa (transl. Monisha is my Monalisa) is a 1999 Indian Tamil-language romance film written, directed and produced by T. Rajendar who also composed the music and portrayed a supporting role as a philosopher, Kaadhaldasan. It stars Ramankanth (Raman Trikha) and Mumtaj in the lead love roles. Rajendar's sons, Silambarasan and Kuralarasan, appear in the opening song of the film, "Monisha", sung by the former. Monisha En Monalisa was released on 12 April 1999.

== Plot ==
Rahul leads a wretched life. He is mistreated by his stepmother, who is Sharmila's aunt, and largely ignored by his submissive father. He is also irritated by his housemate, Sharmila. His world brightens when he attends a concert by pop singer Monisha. He instantly falls in love with her and tries to win her over by wooing her over the phone. Monisha, who hates men and the concept of love itself, initially resists his advances. However, his relentless efforts pay off and she agrees to meet him in person. Unfortunately, as Rahul happily goes to meet Monisha, he meets with an accident and dies. The film hinges on whether Monisha will ever get to meet her lover.

== Cast ==
- Raman Trikha as Rahul (credited as Ramankanth)
- Mumtaj as Monisha
- T. Rajendar as Kaadhaldasan (director)
- Meenal Pendse as Sharmila
- Deepshika as Shalini, Monisha's PA and friend
- Vadivelu
- Ravi Kishan as Ravi
- Hemant Pandey
- Kalpana Iyer
- Vennira Aadai Moorthy as Monisha's doctor
- Balasaravanan
- Silambarasan in a song appearance
- Kuralarasan in a song appearance

== Production ==
The song Tholaipesi Enna was shot at a grand budget of ₹10 million, but the film had troubles after floods in Chennai washed away a set erected on the banks of the Cooum. During the production of the film, the film was renamed from Monisha to Monisha En Monalisa due to astrological reasons. The film had begun production as a trilingual in Tamil, Hindi and Telugu, and Rajender cast local actors for the Hindi version. Hindi television actor Raman Trikha was renamed Ramankanth for the Tamil version.

== Soundtrack ==
The lyrics and soundtrack were written and composed by T. Rajendar respectively. The title song is based on "María" by Puerto Rican singer Ricky Martin. His Master's Voice bought the audio rights of the film and they said to have sold over three lakhs of cassettes within first round.

Track listing
| No. | Title | Singer(s) | Length |
|---|---|---|---|
| 1. | "College Irukkutha" | Mano, Swarnalatha |
| 2. | "Don't Try To Love Me" | Anuradha Sriram |
| 3. | "Ilamaiye" | Anuradha Sriram |
| 4. | "Hello Hello" | S. P. Balasubrahmanyam, Sujatha |
| 5. | "No Problem" | Suresh Peters |
| 6. | "Kaadhale Kaadhale" | P. Unnikrishnan |
| 7. | "Nambathe" | T. Rajendar |
| 8. | "Monisha" | Silambarasan |
| 9. | "Mo Mo Monisha" | Silambarasan |
| 10. | "Monalisa Monalisa" | Silambarasan |
| 11. | "Uyire Vaa Urave Vaa" | Hariharan |
| 12. | "Kaadhal Thedi" | S. P. Balasubrahmanyam |

== Release and reception ==
Monisha En Monalisa released on 12 April 1999. K. P. S. of Kalki called it an unbelievable, tiring, cliched love story. D. S. Ramanujam of The Hindu gave the film a more positive review, calling it a "feather in the cap of versatile artiste and technician, T. Rajender. With single-minded devotion and perseverance, he has taken up the seven important tasks in the film - story, screenplay, dialogue, lyrics, music, cinematography and direction".
