= Sonnal Thaan Kaadhala =

2001 film by T. Rajendar

- Poster
- Directed by: T. Rajendar
- Written by: T. Rajendar
- Produced by: T. Rajendar
- Starring: T. Rajendar; Murali; Roja; Karan
- Cinematography: T. Rajendar
- Edited by: P. R. Shanmugam
- Music by: T. Rajendar
- Production company: Chimbu Cine Arts
- Release date: 18 May 2001
- Running time: 180 minutes
- Country: India
- Language: Tamil

Sonnal Thaan Kaadhala (transl. Is it love simply if one says so?) is a 2001 Indian Tamil-language romantic drama film written, directed and produced by T. Rajendar, who also composed the music and stars alongside Murali, Roja, Karan, Livingston, Swathi and Vadivelu. T. Rajendar's son and actor, Silambarasan, makes a special appearance in 2 songs. The film released on 18 May 2001.

== Plot ==
T. R. (T. Rajendar) investigates a case in which Roja (Roja) is the lead female singer. Roja works in a finance firm and has a big family of three sisters, a brother (Kuralarasan Rajendar), an alcoholic father (Manivannan), and a mother (Vadivukkarasi) to support. Murali (Murali), her office colleague, loves her and makes his intention clear in every opportunity that he gets. However, Roja has no time for him. T. R. has a sister named Saro (Swathi), who is married to a corrupt cop named Inbaraj (Karan). Inbaraj, furious about T. R. exposing him in his newspaper, harasses Saro, egged on by his avaricious mother (Y. Vijaya) and sister (Bhuvaneswari). The burden of taking care of the family becomes a little too much for Roja. Finally T. R., against all odds, advises Roja to accept Murali's love.

== Cast ==
- T. Rajendar as T. R. (director)
- Murali as Murali
- Roja as Roja
- Karan as Inspector Inbaraj
- Vadivukkarasi as Roja's mother
- Manivannan as Roja's father
- Vadivelu as Roja's brother-in-law
- Kuralarasan as Roja's brother
- Kovai Sarala as Roja's elder sister
- Rajashree as Roja's sister
- Livingston as Roja's uncle
- Khushbu as Mumtaj
- M. N. Nambiar as Mumtaj's father
- Swathi as Saro, T. R.'s sister
- Y. Vijaya as Inbaraj's mother
- Vennira Aadai Moorthy as Inbaraj's father
- Bhuvaneswari as Inbaraj's sister
- Rajeev as Roja's boss
- Pandu as Film Director
- Idichapuli Selvaraj as Constable
- Mumtaj as Chitra
- Charle
- Madhan Bob
- Anu Mohan
- Dhamu
- V. K. Ramasamy
- Oru Viral Krishna Rao
- Vellai Subbaiah
- Halwa Vasu
- Mayilsamy
- Vaiyapuri
- Silambarasan in a special appearance in 2 songs

== Production ==
T. Rajender announced that his son Silambarasan would play the lead role in Kadhal Azhivathillai in 2000. After failing to find a suitable lead actress to appear opposite Silambarasan, Rajender postponed the project and started to make Sonnal Thaan Kaadhala. Bobby, actress Rajashri's sister, was cast in a leading role, but the actress opted to work on other Telugu films instead. Subsequently, her role in Sonnal Thaan Kaadhala was shortened, as Rajender continued to shoot without her.

== Soundtrack ==
There are eight songs composed by T. Rajendar.

Track listing
| No. | Title | Singer(s) | Length |
|---|---|---|---|
| 1. | "Chukkumala Chukkumala" | Silambarasan, Tippu |
| 2. | "Kaathalikka Theriyuma" | Krishnaraj, T. Rajendar |
| 3. | "Mullaaga Kuththakoodaathu" | Silambarasan |
| 4. | "Rosaappoove" | Balesh, K. J. Yesudas |
| 5. | "Sonnalthaan" | K. S. Chithra, Hariharan |
| 6. | "Sonnalthan" | Hariharan |
| 7. | "Vaada Vaada" |
| 8. | "Vela Vela" | T. Rajendar, Shankar Mahadevan |

== Reception ==
Visual Dasan of Kalki wrote poignant romance, warm sentiment, menacing sets, these elements make a typical Rajender film. this one is a mixed bag which seems to have mistakenly copied his own style. Malini Mannath of Chennai Online wrote "Too many characters, and it is a hotchpotch of situations. T.Rajender's fans will be definitely disappointed!". The film also reviewed by Ananda Vikatan. It won two Tamil Nadu State Film Awards: Best Family Film and Best Child Star (Kuralarasan).
