= Manmadhan (film) =

2004 Indian romantic psychological thriller film

- 100th day theatrical run poster
- Directed by: A. J. Murugan
- Written by: Silambarasan; Balakumaran (dialogues)
- Produced by: S. K. Krishnakanth
- Starring: Silambarasan; Jyothika
- Cinematography: R. D. Rajasekhar; S. Moorthy
- Edited by: Anthony
- Music by: Yuvan Shankar Raja
- Production company: Indian Theatre Production
- Distributed by: Simbu Cine Arts
- Release date: 12 November 2004
- Running time: 158 minutes
- Country: India
- Language: Tamil
- Budget: ₹5 crore

Manmadhan (titled onscreen as Maanmathaun) (Note: The first A and U in "Maanmathaun" are not pronounced.)(transl. Cupid) is a 2004 Indian Tamil-language romantic crime thriller film directed by A. J. Murugan in his debut. The film stars Silambarasan and Jyothika, with Goundamani, Sindhu Tolani, Atul Kulkarni and Santhanam playing supporting roles. It revolves around a serial killer who targets seemingly immoral women cheating in the name of love.

Manmadhan opened theatrically on 12 November 2004, coinciding with Diwali. It was received favourably and had a blockbuster run at the box office for over 150 days at the time of its release. The film was remade in Kannada as Madana (2006).

== Plot ==
Madhan Kumar is an auditor who lives in Chennai and also learns music part-time in a college. Mythili, a naive woman, also learns music from the same college. She gets scared upon seeing Madhan one day because she happens to witness a dream of her getting raped by him. Later, she realises his kind nature, and they both become friends.

However, Madhan is secretly a serial killer under the pseudonym "Manmadhan", who hunts and kills seemingly 'immoral' girls in the city by seducing them before rendering them unconscious using chloroform. He burns the girls' corpses and stores their ashes in bottles with their respective names. Whenever he intends to kill a girl by seducing her, he suffers a nosebleed. Similarly, he kills a psychiatrist, a girl in a pub, a girl in a cafe, a train passenger, and a few other so called immoral girls. The media attention turns towards the case of missing girls, and Chennai's new ACP Deva takes charge to find the person behind the crimes.

One day, Mythili finds Madhan riding a bike with a girl as pillion. The next day, Mythili is shocked to learn that the girl whom she spotted with Madhan is a missing person. Mythili thinks that Madhan is behind the crimes in the city and informs Deva about Madhan's whereabouts. Thus, Madhan gets arrested. During interrogation, Madhan reveals that his younger twin brother Madhan Raj is responsible for the murders and narrates their past.

Madhan Raj and Madhan Kumar lived with their maternal uncle Puncture Pandiyan in Madhampatty, on the outskirts of Coimbatore district, as their parents had died years ago. While Kumar was brave, intelligent, and practical, Raj was innocent and sentimental. After Kumar went to study for auditorship in Chennai, Raj moved to Coimbatore to study in an engineering college. There, he became very close and friendly with his hostel roommate Bobby and fell in love with his classmate Vaishnavi, who also reciprocated his feelings upon seeing his good nature. However, Raj's senior friend Ravi informed him that Vaishnavi was having an illicit affair with her relative Seenu, who is studying at the same college. He did not believe him and instead beat up Ravi. When Raj confronted Vaishnavi, she reprimanded him for not trusting her.

Raj realised his mistake and went to Vaishnavi's house to apologise, only to witness her having sex with Seenu and enjoying the moment, realising that Ravi was correct all along. Raj also overheard Vaishnavi's conversation with Seenu that she pretended to love him and wanted to marry him so she could take advantage of his innocence and sincere love, which would help her live how she wanted and have Raj as her slave. Raj confronted Vaishnavi, who attempted to cover up the situation. Not fooled, Raj killed her and Seenu. He approached Kumar and bragged about the whole incident. Unrepentant, Raj said he would set out in search of girls cheating in the name of love to kill them and threatened to kill Kumar too if he informed the police, subsequently rebranding himself "Manmadhan".

In the present, the police investigate further about Raj and find solid evidence against him. Kumar, with Pandiyan's help, is released from the case. Mythili apologizes to Kumar and proposes to him, but he rejects, saying he does not love her and had treated her as a friend. Mythili leaves, saying she will wait for Kumar, believing he will accept her love someday.

Unknown to anyone except Kumar, Raj, after killing Vaishnavi and Seenu, did meet Kumar but did not threaten him. Instead, he expressed regret for killing them, and he did so only because he was triggered due to what they were doing, and committed suicide out of grief. Kumar hence decided to avenge Raj's death by killing girls who cheat in the name of love, under the pseudonym Manmadhan, and developed his nosebleed from then on. Kumar has concealed Raj's death, thereby using his identity as a scapegoat so that he could escape if caught.

It is shown that Kumar indeed loves Mythili for her innocence and good demeanour, but cannot and will not express his feelings for her. He declares that if his brother had loved a girl like her, he would also have lived happily, and Kumar would have married Mythili and also been happy. Hence, Kumar concludes that avenging his brother's death is more important than killing immoral girls, and only God can judge his actions. The film ends with a message that even if Manmadhan has escaped the police, he will answer for his actions before the law someday.

== Cast ==
- Silambarasan as Madhan Kumar and Madhan Raj
- Jyothika as Mythili
- Goundamani as Puncture Pandiyan
- Sindhu Tolani as Vaishnavi
- Atul Kulkarni as ACP Deva IPS
- Mandira Bedi as the psychiatrist who was Manmadhan's target
- Yana Gupta as Yana in "Thathai Thathai" song (Item number)
- Brinda Parekh as a train passenger who was Manmadhan's target
- Arzoo Govitrikar as girl in cafe who was Manmadhan's target
- T. P. Gajendran as the village landlord
- Sathyan as Inspector Sakthi
- Santhanam as Bobby
- Crane Manohar as Puncture Pandiyan's worker

Uncredited

- Balakrishna as Seenu
- Mayuri as Malathi
- Guhan Shanmugam as Vinod, Madhan Kumar's college rival
- Dr. S. Suresh Kumar as Reporter

== Production ==
Manmadhan is the directorial debut of A. J. Murugan. He said the script was initially pitched to Ajith Kumar in 1999, and Ajith, despite showing interest, asked Murugan to wait but never returned. In 2001, Murugan narrated the script to Silambarasan, who accepted. S. K. Krishnakanth, who agreed to produce the film, later told Murugan that Silambarasan wanted credit for the story and dialogues, and Silambarasan's mother Usha told Murugan he would only be allowed to continue as director if he credited her son for the story. Unwilling to jeopardise his career, Murugan complied.

Jyothika was cast as the lead actress. While assistant directors wanted to cast Vadivelu in a comedic role, Silambarasan favoured Santhanam after watching his performance on the comedy television series Lollu Sabha. Hindi actress Mandira Bedi was chosen to appear in a cameo while Czech model Yana Gupta was recruited for a dance number with both making their debut in Tamil. The first schedule was college scenes which were shot at NIFT in Chennai with around 2000 students. According to cinematographer R. D. Rajasekhar, Manmadhan was the first Tamil film to be colour corrected through digital technology which was done by Prasad EFX.

Silambarasan experienced difficulties with Murugan during production, and was widely reported by the media to have "ghost-directed" the film. Murugan was later critical of the actor allegedly interfering with the project. Separately, Goundamani was angered that Silambarasan edited out many of his scenes as he had signed on the film with the promise that his role was major. He was also discontent with Silambarasan's choice to cast Santhanam due to Lollu Sabha parodying and mocking films.

== Soundtrack ==
The soundtrack was composed by Yuvan Shankar Raja. "En Aasai Mythiliye", sung by Silambarasan, is remixed from his father T. Rajendar's original song in Mythili Ennai Kaathali (1986), with new lyrics written by Pa. Vijay.

Song	Singer(s)	Lyrics	Duration
"Thathai Thathai"	Silambarasan, Clinton Cerejo, Blaaze, Vasundhara Das	Vaali, Blaaze (English lyrics)	5:55
"Manmadhane Nee"	Sadhana Sargam	Snehan	4:34
"Oh Mahire"	Anushka Manchanda	Pa. Vijay	5:49
"Vaanamunna"	Shankar Mahadevan, Palakkad Sreeram	Na. Muthukumar	5:08
"En Aasai Mythiliye"	Silambarasan, Suchitra	Pa. Vijay	4:25
"Kadhal Valarthen"	KK	Na. Muththukumar	7:28

Telugu version

The lyrics were written by Veturi, Vennalakanti and Buvana Chandra.

Song	Singer(s)	Duration	Lyricist	Notes
"Thathai Thathai"	Devi Sri Prasad, Clinton Cerejo, Kalpana, Vasundhara Das	5:52	Vennelakanti	
"Manmadhuda Nee"	K. S. Chithra	4:30	Veturi	
"Ningilanti manasu choodu"	Tippu, Murali	5:02	Veturi, Bhuvana Chandra	
"Kadanna prema"	S. P. B. Charan	6:54	Veturi	
"Andaala Menakave"	Ranjith, Suchitra	4:19	Bhuvana Chandra	

All music is composed by Yuvan Shankar Raja.

Bonus tracks (Second release)
No.	Title	Singer(s)	Length
7.	"Sedi Onnu mulaikuthe"	Silambarasan	1:34
8.	"Sedi Onnu mulaikuthe (Music)"	Instrumental	0:35
9.	"Kannale"	Yuvan Shankar Raja	1:12
10.	"Sedi Sedi Onnu 2"	Silambarasan	0:49
11.	"Fight Theme"	Instrumental	0:47
12.	"Pesamalae Mugam"	Yuvan Shankar Raja	1:44
13.	"Sedi Sedi Onnu 3"	Silambarasan	1:19
14.	"Thathai Thathai 2"	Silambarasan, Clinton Cerejo, Blaaze, Vasundhara Das	5:52
15.	"Manmadhan Theme 1"	Instrumental	2:35
16.	"Manmadhan Theme 2"	Instrumental	1:34
17.	"Manmadhan Theme 3"	Instrumental	0:59
18.	"Manmadhan Theme 4"	Instrumental	1:02
19.	"Manmadhan Theme 5"	Instrumental	1:24
20.	"Manmadhan Theme 6"	Instrumental	0:45
Total length:			22:11

Additionally the song "Yakkai Thiri" composed by A. R. Rahman for the 2004 film Aayutha Ezhuthu was re-used for the film.

== Release ==
Manmadhan received an A (adults only) certificate from the censor board with some cuts. Though made on a high budget of ₹5 crore, it was sold at a deficit to distributors. However, the film opened with 140 prints and emerged successful despite facing competition from other Diwali releases such as Attahasam, Neranja Manasu and Chatrapathy.

=== Critical reception ===
Sify wrote, "Manmathan is a taut thriller which engrosses the viewers with an engaging [narration], presentation, and is technically top class. [Silambarasan] has taken the audience by surprise with a good performance and contrary to his loud image that he had in films so far, he is a revelation". Malathi Rangarajan of The Hindu wrote that Silambarasan's "impressive story telling skills find the right platform" in Manmadhan. She added, "The hero takes on the onus of story, screenplay and direction supervision for the first time and displays a reasonable level of maturity." Malini Mannath of Chennai Online wrote, "Manmadhan is worth a watch, an engaging suspense thriller, a fare different from the routine romance-action flicks dished out to the audience." Visual Dasan of Kalki wrote that, though reminiscent of many American films including The Bone Collector, the plot was full of unpredictable twists and turns, and impresses without knives and without blood. Cinesouth wrote, "Though this movie is inspired by the films Sigappu Rojakkal and Manmadha Leelai, we can realize the efforts that had gone into the screenplay by Silambarasan to make it different. The film's richness is a tribute to the producer. The director Muruhan had used ultra modern equipments and technology in this film efficiently". G. Ulaganathan of Deccan Herald wrote, "Though the film has shades of Kamal-Bharathi Raja's Sigappu Rojakkal, Manmadhan is Simbu's show all the way. [..] The major assets to the film are gripping narrative, good music by Yuvan Shankar Raja and Rajshekar's captivating camera".

=== Box-office ===
According to Sify, the film's collection reports from Chennai, Coimbatore and Salem distribution territories indicated that it surged ahead of Attahasam in its second week due to "rave reviews in the media and word-of-mouth among the youth".

== Other versions ==
Manmadhan was dubbed in Telugu as Manmadha, and remade in Kannada as Madana (2006). In 2018, Murugan said he heard the producers were in talks to sell the Hindi remake rights.

== Re-release ==
A digitally remastered version of the film was released on 19 March 2021.

== Legacy ==
The dialogue "Apo Puriyala Ipo Puriyudhu" (transl. I didn't get it then, now I do) spoken by Silambarasan attained popularity and has since entered Tamil vernacular.
