= T. Rajendar =

Indian actor and film director

Member of Tamil Nadu Legislative Assembly
- In office 10 May 1996 – 14 May 2001
- Preceded by: U. Baluraman
- Succeeded by: S. G. Vinayakamurthi
- Constituency: Park Town

Personal details
- Born: Vijay Thesingu Rajender Mayiladuthurai, Tamil Nadu, India
- Party: Latchiya Dravida Munnetra Kazhagam (from 2004)
- Other political affiliations: Dravida Munnetra Kazhagam (until 1991 and 1995-2004) Thayaga Marumalarchi Kazhagam (1991-1995)
- Spouse: Usha Rajendar
- Children: 3 including Silambarasan and Kuralarasan
- Occupation: Actor, Film director, Film producer, Musician, Cinematographer and Film distributor

Vijay Thesingu Rajendar, also known as T. R., is an Indian actor, film director, film producer, musician, cinematographer, film distributor and politician who works primarily in the Tamil film industry. Rajendar is known for being able to speak in rhyming sentences spontaneously and incessant rapping.

Since 2018, he has been focusing primarily on singing film songs.

== Personal life ==
T. Rajendar is married to former actress Usha Rajendar. They have two sons, Silambarasan and Kuralarasan, and one daughter, Ilakiya. His wife has served as the producer for some of his films, such as Kadhal Azhivathillai (2002), starring Silambarasan. He lives in Chennai, Tamil Nadu.

== Film career ==
Rajendar started off in the Tamil film industry making successful films which included him as an actor, playback singer, dancer and scriptwriter. He gained popularity through his one-of-a-kind style of acting. He normally serves as, but not limited to director, actor, songwriter, art director, production manager and playback singer. During the 1980s, all his movies were blockbusters, running for years and the songs were also well appreciated. He is known for introducing new faces in his movies, and many of the actresses who debuted in his movies have been successful in South Cinema, including Amala, Nalini, Jyothi, Jeevitha and Mumtaj.

After some years, Rajendar's films started to decline in popularity because his films became too predictable, tending to follow the same storyline and oratory style of repetitious dialogues with little if any meaning. For example, his films always contain a sentimental scene involving the hero's younger sister in distress, coupled with the same rhyming rhetoric and gestures.

Rajendar recently started his own web TV channel called 'Kural TV' (Voice TV). Originally he wanted to start a 24-hour TV channel but could not, due to problems arising while securing a license. The channel, apart from broadcasting his movies and speeches, tends to echo sentiments towards the plight of Tamils (especially women) in Sri Lanka. He previously owned a magazine called Usha.

Rajendar also distributes films under his home banner "Simbu cine arts". His latest film distribution, as of mid-2011 is his son Silambarasan's film Vaanam, which will be distributed in the Chennai and Madurai region.

== Political career ==
Rajendar founded the Thayaga Marumalarchi Kazhagam party in 1991 after he had been expelled from the Dravida Munnetra Kazhagam (DMK) party. In 1996, after Vaiko's departure from the DMK and the formation of Marumalarchi Dravida Munnetra Kazhagam, Rajendar's TMK merged with the DMK. Rajendar left the DMK again in 2004, to form the All India Latchiya Dravida Munnetra Kazhagam. Before expulsion, he was the propaganda secretary of DMK and was elected from Park Town constituency in the 1996 Assembly polls. He further supported the DMK in the 2006 Assembly elections in 223 constituencies but his party had contested on its own in 11 constituencies including himself contested on Mayiladuthurai in Rail Engine Symbol. After those 2006 elections, the DMK came back to power and he was made vice-chairman of the Small Savings Scheme. He subsequently quit the post. In 2009 Parliament election, he contested on Kallakurichi.

== Filmography ==
Year	Title	Credited as				Notes	Ref.
Year	Title	Director	Writer	Producer	Cinematographer	Notes	Ref.
1980	Oru Thalai Ragam	Uncredited	Yes				
1980	Vasantha Azhaippugal	Yes	Yes				
1981	Rail Payanangalil	Yes	Yes				
1982	Nenjil Oru Raagam	Yes	Yes				
1982	Raagam Thedum Pallavi	Yes	Yes				
1983	Uyirullavarai Usha	Yes	Yes	Yes			
1983	Thangaikkor Geetham	Yes	Yes	Yes	Yes		
1984	Uravai Kaatha Kili	Yes	Yes		Yes		
1985	Unakkaga Oru Roja		Yes				
1986	Mythili Ennai Kaathali	Yes	Yes	Yes	Yes		
1987	Oru Thayin Sabhatham	Yes	Screenplay	Yes	Yes		
1987	Pookkal Vidum Thudhu		Screenplay				
1988	En Thangai Kalyani	Yes	Yes	Yes	Yes		
1989	Samsara Sangeetham	Yes	Yes	Yes	Yes		
1991	Shanti Enathu Shanti	Yes	Yes	Yes	Yes		
1992	Enga Veetu Velan	Yes	Yes	Yes	Yes		
1993	Sabash Babu		Screenplay				
1993	Pettredutha Pillai		Yes	Yes			
1994	Oru Vasantha Geetham	Yes	Yes	Yes	Yes		
1995	Thai Thangai Paasam	Yes	Yes	Yes	Yes		
1999	Monisha En Monalisa	Yes	Yes	Yes	Yes		
2001	Sonnal Thaan Kathala	Yes	Yes	Yes	Yes		
2002	Kadhal Azhivathillai	Yes	Yes	Yes	Yes		
2007	Veerasamy	Yes	Yes	Yes	Yes		
2016	Idhu Namma Aalu			Yes			

=== As an actor ===
Year	Title	Role	Notes	Ref.
1980	Oru Thalai Ragam	Hindi-singing student	Cameo appearance	
1980	Vasantha Azhaippugal	Kandar		
1981	Rail Payanangalil	Train passenger	Cameo appearance in song "Vasantham Paadi Vara"	
1982	Nenjil Oru Raagam	Geetha's brother		
1982	Raagam Thedum Pallavi	Actor, Foreign director (voice)	Cameo appearance	
1983	Uyirullavarai Usha	Chain Jayapal		
1983	Thangaikkor Geetham	Soolakaruppan	Nominated, Filmfare Award for Best Actor – Tamil	
1984	Uravai Kaatha Kili	Bhaskar, Chinnathambi	Dual roles	
1986	Mythili Ennai Kaathali	Manickam		
1987	Oru Thayin Sabhatham	Rajkumar		
1988	En Thangai Kalyani	Velu		
1989	Samsara Sangeetham	Kaalidasan		
1991	Santhi Enathu Santhi	Santhi's lover		
1993	Sabash Babu	Veluchamy	Guest appearance	
1994	Oru Vasantha Geetham	Advocate		
1995	Thai Thangai Paasam	Velu		
1999	Monisha En Monalisa	Kaadhaldasan		
2001	Sonnal Thaan Kathala	T. R.		
2002	Kadhal Virus	Himself	Guest appearance	
2002	Kadhal Azhivathillai	Vakkeel Dada		
2006	Vallavan	Himself	Guest appearance in song "Yammadi Aathadi"	
2007	Veerasamy	Veerasamy		
2013	Arya Surya	Himself	Guest appearance in song "Thagadu Thagadu"	
2017	Kavan	Mayilvaganan		
2017	Vizhithiru	Himself	Guest appearance in song "Papparappa"	

=== As lyricist ===
Year	Film	Songs	Composer	Ref.
1981	Kilinjalgal	All songs	Himself	
1982	Sattam Sirikkiradhu	All songs	Himself	
1985	Engal Kural	All songs	Himself	
1986	Pookkalai Parikkatheergal	All songs	Himself	
1987	Muthukkal Moondru	All songs	Himself	
1987	Cooliekkaran	All songs	Himself	
1987	Poo Poova Poothirukku	All songs	Himself	
1987	Ivargal Varungala Thoongal	All songs	Himself	
1987	Aayusu Nooru	All songs	Himself	
1989	Enga Veettu Deivam	All songs	Himself	
1996	En Aasai Thangachi	All songs	Himself	
1996	Pombala Siricha Pochu	All songs	Himself	
2002	Sri Bannari Amman	All songs	Himself	
2021	Maaligai	"Omkara"	Mahesh Mahadev	
2022	Astakarmma	"Thatlam Thatlam"	L .V. Muthu Ganesh	

=== As distributor ===
- Vaanam (2011)
- Vaalu (2015)
- Kadamaiyai Sei (2022)

=== Television ===
- Super Kudumbam - Sun TV
- Arattai Arangam - Sun TV
- Nyayam Endrum Solven - Vijay TV

== Discography ==
=== As composer ===
Year	Film	Ref.
1980	Oru Thalai Ragam	
1980	Vasantha Azhaipugal	
1981	Rail Payanangalil	
1981	Kilinjalgal	
1982	Nenjil Oru Raagam	
1982	Sattam Sirikkiradhu	
1982	Raagam Thedum Pallavi	
1983	Uyirullavarai Usha	
1983	Thangaikkor Geetham	
1984	Uravai Kaatha Kili	
1985	Unakkaga Oru Roja	
1985	Engal Kural	
1986	Pookkalai Parikkatheergal	
1986	Mythili Ennai Kaathali	
1987	Muthukkal Moondru	
1987	Oru Thayin Sabhatham	
1987	Cooliekkaran	
1987	Poo Poova Poothirukku	
1987	Ivargal Varungala Thoongal	
1987	Pookkal Vidum Thudhu	
1987	Aayusu Nooru	
1988	En Thangai Kalyani	
1989	Samsara Sangeetham	
1991	Shanti Enathu Shanti	
1992	Enga Veetu Velan	
1993	Pettredutha Pillai	
1993	Sabash Babu	
1994	Oru Vasantha Geetham	
1995	Thai Thangai Paasam	
1996	En Aasai Thangachi	
1996	Pombala Siricha Pochu	
1999	Monisha En Monalisa	
2001	Sonnal Thaan Kathala	
2002	Kadhal Azhivathillai	
2002	Sri Bannari Amman	
2007	Veerasamy	

=== As playback singer ===
Year	Song	Film	Composer	Notes
1983	"Thatti Paarthen"	Thangaikkor Geetham	T. Rajendar	
1984	"Adangoppan Mavane"	Uravai Kaatha Kili	T. Rajendar	
1986	"En Aasai Mythiliye" "Ada Ponnana"	Mythili Ennai Kaathali	T. Rajendar	
1994	"Pogaathe Pogaathe"	Oru Vasantha Geetham	T. Rajendar	
1999	"Nambaathe"	Monisha En Monalisa	T. Rajendar	
2001	"Kaadhalikka Theriyuma"	Sonnal Thaan Kaadhala	T. Rajendar	
2002	"Vetrinadai", "Roopamani", Nambinorai	Sri Bannari Amman	T. Rajendar	
2006	"Ammadi Athadi"	Vallavan	Yuvan Shankar Raja	
2007	"Marakka Mudiyala" "Sollalaiye Kadhal" "Varaanpaaru" "Vechuriken"	Veerasamy	T. Rajendar	
2007	"Gun Ganapathi"	Oram Po	G. V. Prakash Kumar	
2008	"Aathadi"	Sandai	Dhina	
2009	"Aandipatti Arasampatti"	Rajadhi Raja	Karunas	
2011	"Dooda"	Doo	Abhishek-Lawrence	
2011	"Chennai Gaana"	Puli Vesham	Srikanth Deva	
2011	"Kalasala Kalasala"	Osthe	S. Thaman	
2012	"Yamma Yamma"	Thiruthani	Perarasu	
2013	"En Aalu"	Summa Nachunu Irukku	Achu Rajamani	
2013	"Thagadu Thagadu"	Arya Surya	Srikanth Deva	
2014	"Tharumaru"	Vaalu	S. Thaman	
2014	"Chai Chai"	Raj Bahadur	Jeevith Krupa	Kannada film
2015	"Papparappa"	Vizhithiru	Sathyan Mahalingam	
2015	"Summa Polama"	Chikkiku Chikkikkichu	Vijay Benjamin	
2016	"Maaman Waiting"	Idhu Namma Aalu	Kuralarasan	
2016	"Raangu"	Theri	G. V. Prakash Kumar	
2016	"Damakutalaan"	Koditta Idangalai Nirappuga	C. Sathya	
2017	"Happy New Year"	Kavan	Hiphop Tamizha	
2018	"Monkistha Kinkistha"	Koothan	Balz_G	
2022	"Thatlam Thatlam"	Astakarmma	L .V. Muthu Ganesh	
2023	"Adhirudha"	Mark Antony	G. V. Prakash Kumar	
2023	"Goli Soda"	Paatti Sollai Thattathe	Vijay Shankar	
2024	"Jiloma"	The Boys	Arun Gautham	
2025	"Kaalaiyile Koovudhu"	Vettu	Dharma Teja	
2025	"Chikang Gokang"	Leg Piece	Bjorn Surrao	
2025	"Chikitu"	Coolie	Anirudh Ravichander	Also sang for all dubbed versions
2025	"Dandanakka Life'U"	Aaromaley	Siddhu Kumar	
