= Idhu Namma Aalu (2016 film) =

2016 film by Pandiraj

- Theatrical release poster
- Directed by: Pandiraj
- Written by: Pandiraj
- Produced by: T. Rajendar; Usha Rajendar
- Starring: Silambarasan; Nayantara; Andrea Jeremiah
- Cinematography: Balasubramaniam
- Edited by: Praveen K. L.
- Music by: Kuralarasan
- Production companies: Simbhu Cine Arts; Pasanga Productions
- Distributed by: Sri Thenandal Films
- Release date: 27 May 2016
- Country: India
- Language: Tamil

Idhu Namma Aalu (lit. 'He is our man'; coll. She is my lover) is a 2016 Indian Tamil-language romantic comedy film written, co-produced and directed by Pandiraj. The film stars Silambarasan, Nayantara and Andrea Jeremiah, while Soori and Jayaprakash portray supporting roles. This film was produced by T. Rajender and music was composed by Kuralarasan. In the film, Shiva is an IT professional in Chennai. His father arranges a meeting with Myla. Though skeptical about arranged marriages, Shiva is instantly smitten by Myla's beauty and direct nature.

This film released on 27 May 2016 was highly anticipated from audience and opened with mixed reviews but became an above average success at the box office. The film was partially reshot in Telugu as Sarasudu (2017) with Soori and Satyam Rajesh swapping roles.

== Plot ==
Shiva (Silambarasan) is an IT engineer with Vaasu (Soori) as his driver and colleague. He visits Myla (Nayanthara) for a marriage proposal and instantly likes her. Myla wishes to speak to him privately and asks him about Priya (Andrea Jeremiah), his ex-girlfriend. Shiva accepts his old love for her. He then leaves the house thinking the marriage will not happen, but Myla accepts the marriage proposal. Later, they start speaking on the phone, and Shiva tells his old love story and how they broke up. Myla starts loving Shiva deeply and in the beginning tests him, and later they are love locked couple. One day both their parents fight about a trivial issue, and the marriage is cancelled. Myla attempts suicide as she does not want to give up Shiva but is saved by his father (Jayaprakash). Myla and Shiva reunite and marry. As the story moves, they finally have a child and live happily.

== Cast ==
- Silambarasan as Shiva
- Nayantara as Myla
- Andrea Jeremiah as Priya
- Soori as Vaasu
- Arjunan as Shiva's friend
- Jayaprakash as Shiva's father
- Uday Mahesh as Myla's father
- Dheepa Ramanujam as Mylaa's mother
- Madhusudhan Rao as Priya's father
- Satyam Rajesh as Shiva's and Vaasu's friend
- Velraj as Shiva's and Vaasu's friend and Appear in Register Marriage scene (uncredited)
- Amuthaavaani Arumugam
- Jai as Surya, Myla's relative (guest appearance)
- Santhanam as Sherlock Holmes (cameo appearance)
- Adah Sharma in a special appearance in the song "Maaman Waiting"
- Pandiraj as Corporate Official (guest appearance)

== Production ==
=== Development ===
The film was in development as early as 2013. In an interview with IndiaGlitz, Pandiraj said that, aware that he and Silambarasan had different working styles, he told the actor that the film had to be completed within four months and Silambarasan was receptive of the idea.

=== Filming ===
Silambarasan began filming his portions from October 2013 alongside Soori in Urapakkam, and worked on the film during the day before joining the team of Achcham Enbadhu Madamaiyada (2016) during the night time in the period. The first schedule was completed without a lead actress, and the second schedule was briefly delayed as Pandiraj weighed up his options on his casting decision. The film's cinematographer Balasubrameniem had discussed the film's plot with Udhayanidhi Stalin during the making of Idhu Kathirvelan Kadhal (2014), and Stalin had convinced the actress of that film, Nayantara, to meet Pandiraj. Subsequently, Nayantara signed on to be a part of the film during November 2013, agreeing to work with Silambarasan for the first time since their break-up, with the news creating increased hype around the project. By early 2014, Pandiraj revealed the film was being developed under the title of Idhu Namma Aalu, but had no resemblance to the 1988 film.

In August 2014, Andrea Jeremiah was cast. The project first ran into production troubles during July 2014, when Silambarasan had changed his hairstyle in-between schedule breaks, leaving Pandiraj unhappy. Silambarasan subsequently disclosed to the media that Idhu Namma Aalu was his production and that others should not question his involvement in the project. Despite a brief tussle, the final schedule of the talkie portion began in August 2014. In December 2014, Pandiraj announced that the film, including post-production works, were complete and that he was waiting for the songs to be complete, in order to release the film by February 2015.

=== Delays ===
In January 2015, Pandiraj tweeted about his annoyance at Kuralarasan's delay in providing the film's music and stated that a planned teaser scheduled for the month had to be delayed. The director and music composer later exchanged tweets blaming each other for the slow progress of the film. T. Rajendar also submitted a complaint to the Nadigar Sangam during September 2015 remarking that Nayantara was refusing to take part in the shoot of a song. Pandiraj came to her defense, arguing that Nayantara had wasted almost two years on the film due to the producers' poor organization and was still yet to be paid for her work. He further stated that the song in question was an extra kuthu number that the script did not warrant. Silambarasan later shot the song with Adah Sharma during early March 2016, after the actress was given a further small character in the film.

== Soundtrack ==
The music was composed by Kuralarasan in his debut as a music composer, playback singer and lyricist.

Track listing
No.	Title	Lyrics	Singer(s)	Length
1.	"Kaathaga"	Silambarasan, Blaaze	Silambarasan
2.	"Kanne Un Kadhal"	Yugabharathi	Yuvan Shankar Raja
3.	"King Kong"	Madhan Karky	Kuralarasan, Shruti Haasan, Blaaze
4.	"Maaman Waiting"	Madhan Karky	T. Rajendar, Suchithra
5.	"Oru Thalai Ragam"	Kuralarasan	Silambarasan
6.	"Oru Thalai Ragam"	Kuralarasan	Sriram Parthasarathy, Blaaze

== Critical reception ==
In his review for The Hindu, Baradwaj Rangan said, "Simbu and Nayanthara are in good form, and they keep us watching. And wondering".
