= List of Tamil films of 1985 =

Post-amendment to the Tamil Nadu Entertainments Tax Act 1939 on 1 April 1958, Gross jumped to 140 per cent of Nett Commercial Taxes Department disclosed ₹56 crore in entertainment tax revenue for the year.

The following is a list of films produced in the Tamil film industry in India in 1985, in alphabetical order.

Title	Director	Music	Producer	Cast
Aagaya Thamaraigal	V. Azhagappan	Gangai Amaran	Yuvaraj Productions	Suresh, Revathi, Sathyaraj, Goundamani, Manorama, Senthil, S. S. Chandran
Aan Paavam	Pandiarajan	Ilaiyaraaja	Alamu Movies	Pandiyan, Pandiarajan, Revathi, Seetha, V. K. Ramasamy, Janagaraj
Aandavan Sothu	M. Karnan	Shankar–Ganesh	Kalaithottam	Jaishankar, Madhavi
Aasha	V. T. Thyagarajan	K. V. Mahadevan	V. T. T. Creation	Suresh, Nalini, Goundamani
Aduthathu Albert	G. N. Rangarajan	Ilaiyaraaja	Kumaravel Films	Prabhu, Urvashi, Poornima Bhagyaraj, Y. G. Mahendra
Alai Osai	Sirumugai Ravi	Ilaiyaraaja	Thirumal Cine Films	Vijayakanth, Nalini, Radha Ravi, Goundamani, Senthil
Ammavum Neeye Appavum Neeye	S. P. Muthuraman	M. S. Viswanathan	Vasan Brothers	Rajesh, Saritha, Y. G. Mahendra
Amudha Gaanam	K. Rangaraj	Ilaiyaraaja	Vasan Pictures	Vijayakanth, Nalini, Sulakshana, Baby Shalini
Anbin Mugavari	Manivannan	Ilaiyaraaja	Sri Meenakshi Productions	Mohan, Viji, Sasikala, Goundamani, Sathyaraj, Janagaraj, Senthil, Y. Vijaya, Kovai Sarala
Andha Oru Nimidam	Major Sundarrajan	Ilaiyaraaja	Geethakamalam Movies	Kamal Haasan, Urvashi, Major Sundarrajan, Y. G. Mahendra, Jayamalini, Anuradha
Annai Bhoomi	R. Thyagarajan	Ilaiyaraaja	Devar Films	Vijayakanth, Nalini, Radha Ravi, Goundamani
Anni	Karthick Raghunath	Gangai Amaran	Jay Vee Movies	Mohan, Saritha, Jaishankar, Deepa, Rohini, Manorama, Janagaraj
Anthasthu	R. Thyagarajan	Shankar–Ganesh	Devar Films	Jaishankar, Lakshmi, Murali, Ilavarasi, Goundamani, Y. G. Mahendra
Arthamulla Aasaigal	Babu Maharaja	Gangai Amaran	Peninsula Productions	Karthik, Ambika, Anand Babu, Jaishankar
Aval Sumangalithan	Visu	M. S. Viswanathan	Kavithalayaa Productions	Karthik, K. R. Vijaya, Visu, Ilavarasi, Chandrasekhar, Kismu, Nisha
Avan	Chozha Rajan	Shankar–Ganesh	K. R. K. Art Films	Arjun, Ilavarasi
Bandham	K. Vijayan	Shankar–Ganesh	Sujatha Cine Arts	Sivaji Ganesan, Anand Babu, Kajal Kiran, Jaishankar, Baby Shalini
Chain Jayapal	Rama Narayanan	Shankar–Ganesh	Baskar Art Movies	Rajesh, Ilavarasi, Radha Ravi, Sathyaraj, Anuradha, S. S. Chandran, Sadhana
Chidambara Rahasiyam	Visu	Shankar–Ganesh	M. M. Film Circuit	S. Ve. Shekher, Visu, Ilavarasi, Arun Pandian, Kismu, Manorama
Chinna Veedu	K. Bhagyaraj	Ilaiyaraaja	Jaya Vijaya Movies	K. Bhagyaraj, Kalpana, Anu, Jai Ganesh, Manorama
Chithirame Chithirame	Vittal Gnanam	Sivaji Raja	Amara Creations	Rajesh, Lakshmi, Sadhana, Senthil
Deiva Piravi	R. Krishnamoorthy	Shankar–Ganesh	Suresh Productions	Mohan, Radhika, Urvashi, Radha Ravi, V. K. Ramasamy, Thengai Srinivasan, Manorama
Eetti	Rajasekhar	Ilaiyaraaja	Vivekanandha Pictures	Vijayakanth, Nalini, Viji, Sathyaraj, Vishnuvardhan, Goundamani
Elan Kandru	Ameerjan	Gangai Amaran	S. K. Creations	Murali, Anitha Reddy, Mohana Priya
Engal Kural	Rama Narayanan	T. Rajendar	Sivagangai Screens	Suresh, Arjun, Nalini, Jeevitha, S. S. Chandran, Anuradha
Engirunthalum Vazhga	R. Selvaraj	Shankar–Ganesh		Raghuvaran, Archana, Menaka
Erimalai	Gopikrishna	M. S. Viswanathan	Prathana Art Creations	Thiagarajan, Saritha, Sulakshana, Senthil
Geethanjali	K. Rangaraj	Ilaiyaraaja	Pavalar Creations	Murali, Nalini, Bhavya, Sathyaraj, Goundamani, Senthil
Hello Yaar Pesurathu	Ramarajan	Ilaiyaraaja; Gangai Amaran	Vikranth Creations	Suresh, Jeevitha
Hemavin Kadhalargal	T. V. Chandran	Raveendran	Ganga Creations	Delhi Ganesh, Anuradha
Idaya Kovil	Mani Ratnam	Ilaiyaraaja	Motherland Pictures	Mohan, Radha, Ambika, Goundamani
Idhu Engal Rajyam	M. S. Madhu	Shankar–Ganesh	Sri Amman Creations	Rajesh, Jeevitha, Jayashree, Goundamani
Ilamai	Rama Narayanan	Shankar–Ganesh	Charuchithra Films	Anand Babu, Arjun, Jeevitha
Inaintha Kodugal	P. S. Prakash	G. K. Venkatesh	Prasanna Creations	Kamalkar, Sasikala
Irandu Manam	K. Natraj	Gangai Amaran	Murali Cine Arts	Suresh, Sulakshana, Jayashree, Manorama, Senthil
Janani	Nethaji	M. S. Viswanathan	Gemini Pictures	Udhayakumar, Vinoth, Bhavya
Jansi Rani	M. Karnan	Shankar–Ganesh	Cowboy Films	Madhavi, Sarath Babu
Japanil Kalyanaraman	S. P. Muthuraman	Ilaiyaraaja	P. A. Art Productions	Kamal Haasan, Radha, Sathyaraj, Goundamani, Kovai Sarala, Master Tinku
Kaakki Sattai	Rajasekhar	Ilaiyaraaja	Sathya Movies	Kamal Haasan, Ambika, Madhavi, Sathyaraj
Kaaval	K. Vijayan	Shankar–Ganesh	Aparna Art Movies	Thiagarajan, Nalini, Sathyaraj
Kadivalam	Ram Sankar	Shankar–Ganesh	Lakshmi Saraswathi Pictures	Rajeev, Menaka
Kalyana Agathigal	K. Balachander	V. S. Narasimhan	Kavithalayaa Productions	Saritha, Ashok, Y. Vijaya, Vanitha, Kuyili, Nisha, Raveendran
Kalyanam Oru Kalkattu	Jaichander	M. Lakshmi Narayanan	Revathi Screens	Sudhir, Anuradha
Kanni Rasi	Pandiarajan	Ilaiyaraaja	Vikranth Creations	Prabhu, Revathi, Goundamani, Sumithra, Janagaraj, Senthil
Karaiyai Thodadha Alaigal	P. Madhavan	Chandrabose	Arun Prasad Movies	Arun, Ganga, Ilavarasi, Devisri, Manorama, Goundamani, Senthil
Karpoora Deepam	A. Jagannathan	Gangai Amaran	G. R. P. Arts	Sivakumar, Sujatha, Ambika, Goundamani
Karuppu Sattaikaran	M. Karnan	Shankar–Ganesh	Ammu Creations	Thiagarajan, Ambika, Goundamani, S. S. Chandran, Silk Smitha, Anuradha
Kattukulle Thiruvizha	A. Vincent	Shankar–Ganesh	Sri Gayathri Films	Vijayendra, Viji
Ketti Melam	Visu	Ilaiyaraaja	Charuchithra Films	Karthik, Sulakshana, Visu
Kolusu	K. S. Mathangan	Malaysia Vasudevan	Royal Cine Arts	Saritha, Rajesh, Suresh, Sasikala
Kunguma Chimil	R. Sundarrajan	Ilaiyaraaja	Sun Flower Creations	Mohan, Revathi, Ilavarasi, Chandrasekhar
Kutravaaligal	Rama Narayanan	Shankar–Ganesh	Poompuhar Production	Raveendran, Viji, Raghuvaran
Maappillai Singam	Cumbum Durai	Shankar–Ganesh	Khan Films	Menaka, Viji, Dhilip
Mangamma Sabadham	K. Vijayan	Shankar–Ganesh	Suresh & Raj	Kamal Haasan, Madhavi, Sujatha, Sathyaraj, Manorama
Mannukketha Ponnu	Ramarajan	Gangai Amaran	P. S. V. Films	Pandiyan, Chandrasekhar, Ilavarasi, Goundamani, Janagaraj, Senthil
Marudhani	Ramarajan	Gangai Amaran	J. R. Art Films	Pandiyan, Shobana, Sulakshana, Goundamani, S. S. Chandran, Janagaraj, Senthil
Meendum Oru Kaathal Kathai	Pratap K. Pothen	Ilaiyaraaja	Artiste Corporation	Pratap K. Pothen, Radhika, Charuhasan
Meendum Parasakthi	A. Jagannathan	Ilaiyaraaja	Sri Devi Bagavathi Films	Sivakumar, Nalini, Goundamani
Mel Maruvathoor Athiparasakthi	S. Jagadeesan	K. V. Mahadevan	Oaam Selvi Arts	Rajesh, K. R. Vijaya, Saritha, Nalini, Thengai Srinivasan, Senthil
Mookkanan Kaiyiru	S. Subbaiah	M. S. Viswanathan	Bhavani Cine Production	Karthik, Viji, Goundamani, Jaishankar, Manorama
Muthal Mariyathai	Bharathiraja	Ilaiyaraaja	Manoj Creations	Sivaji Ganesan, Radha, Vadivukkarasi
Naagam	Chozha Rajan	Shankar–Ganesh	Sri Thenandal Films	Arjun, Ambika, Sasikala, S. S. Chandran
Naam	R. C. Sakthi	Shankar–Ganesh	Indira Creations	S. Ve. Shekher, Sujatha, Ilavarasi
Nam Iruvar	R. Krishnamoorthy	Gangai Amaran	AVM Productions	Sivaji Ganesan, Prabhu, Srividya, Urvashi
Naan Sigappu Manithan	S. A. Chandrasekhar	Ilaiyaraaja	Lakshmi Productions	Rajinikanth, K. Bhagyaraj, Ambika, Sathyaraj
Naan Ungal Rasigan	Manobala	Gangai Amaran	Saiputhra Films	Mohan, Radhika, Nalini, Goundamani
Naane Raja Naane Mandhiri	Balu Anand	Ilaiyaraaja	Appu Movies	Vijayakanth, Radhika, Jeevitha, Goundamani, Senthil
Nalla Thambi	S. P. Muthuraman	Ilaiyaraaja	AVM Productions	Karthik, Radha, Moulee, Manorama, Anuradha
Navagraha Nayagi	K. Shankar	M. S. Viswanathan	Visakam Arts	K. R. Vijaya, Vijayakanth, Srividya, Major Sundarrajan, Pandiyan, Nalini, Suresh, Sasikala, Viji, Cho
Needhiyin Nizhal	Santhana Bharathi-P. Vasu	Shankar–Ganesh	Sivaji Productions	Sivaji Ganesan, Prabhu, Radha, Srividya
Neethiyin Marupakkam	S. A. Chandrasekhar	Ilaiyaraaja	V. V. Creations	Vijayakanth, Radhika, Jaishankar
Nermai	R. Krishnamoorthy	M. S. Viswanathan	K. R. G. Film Circuit	Sivaji Ganesan, Sujatha, Prabhu, Radhika, Jaishankar
Oonjaladum Uravugal	Bharathan	Ilaiyaraaja	Samathalaya Productions	Jaishankar, Srividya, Suresh, Anitha Reddy
Oru Kaidhiyin Diary	Bharathiraja	Ilaiyaraaja	Janani Art Creations	Kamal Haasan, Radha, Revathi, Janagaraj
Oru Malarin Payanam	Muktha V. Srinivasan	Chandrabose	Muktha Films	Lakshmi, Murali, Urvashi, Sulakshana, Moulee, Janagaraj
Paadum Vaanampadi	M. Jayakumar	Shankar–Ganesh + Bappi Lahiri	K. R. Cine Arts	Anand Babu, Jeevitha, Nagesh
Paartha Gnabagam Illayo	Nagesh	M. S. Viswanathan	A. R. Enterprises	Anand Babu, Ramya Krishnan, Radha Ravi
Padikkadavan	Rajasekhar	Ilaiyaraaja	Sri Eswari Productions	Sivaji Ganesan, Rajinikanth, Ambika, Ramya Krishnan, Nagesh, Janagaraj
Padikkadha Pannaiyar	K. S. Gopalakrishnan	Ilaiyaraaja	Karpaga Lakshmi Pictures	Sivaji Ganesan, K. R. Vijaya, Anuradha, Y. G. Mahendra, Dhilip
Pagal Nilavu	Mani Ratnam	Ilaiyaraaja	Sathya Jyothi Films	Murali, Revathi, Radhika, Sarath Babu, Sathyaraj
Panam Pathum Seyyum	Vijayasingam	Shankar–Ganesh	Dhandayuthapani Films	Goundamani, S. Ve. Shekher, Senthil, Srividya, Urvashi, Radha Ravi, Anuradha
Pattuselai	Raja Annadurai	Gangai Amaran	Sri Sornalakshmi Kalamandir	Pandiyan, Jeevitha, Sathyaraj, Goundamani, Senthil
Perumai	C. V. Rajendran	Shankar–Ganesh	M. M. Combines	Sujatha, Suresh, Rajiv
Pillai Nila	Manobala	Ilaiyaraaja	Kalaimani Movies	Mohan, Nalini, Baby Shalini, Jaishankar, Janagaraj
Poove Poochooda Vaa	Fazil	Ilaiyaraaja	Navodaya Studio	Padmini, Nadhiya, S. Ve. Shekher, Jaishankar
Poruttham	Moulee	Gangai Amaran	Aries Cine Arts	Naresh Kumar, Poornima Rao, Rekha, Moulee, Manorama
Pournami Alaigal	M. Bhaskar	Shankar–Ganesh	Oscar Movies	Sivakumar, Ambika, Revathi, Major Sundarrajan, Sumithra, Prameela, Nizhalgal Ravi, Baby Meena
Prema Paasam	K. Vijayan	Gangai Amaran	Ram Balaji Movies	Sivakumar, Revathi
Pudhiya Sagaptham	Visu	Gangai Amaran	Sri Bhagavathi Creations	Vijayakanth, Ambika, Visu, Kismu
Pudhu Yugam	S. A. Chandrasekhar	Gangai Amaran	V. V. Creations	Sivakumar, Vijayakanth, K. R. Vijaya, Viji, Anuradha, Y. G. Mahendra
Puthiya Theerpu	C. V. Rajendran	Ilaiyaraaja	Ram Arts	Vijayakanth, Ambika, Cho, Janagaraj
Rahasiyam	Rama Narayanan	Gangai Amaran	Meena Production	Chandrasekhar, Nalini, Radha Ravi
Raja Gopuram	P. G. Pandian	Ilaiyaraaja	Sri Jayanthi Cine Arts	Rajesh, Sulakshana, Pandiyan, Nalini, Goundamani
Raja Rishi	K. Shankar	Ilaiyaraaja	Bhairavi Films	Sivaji Ganesan, Prabhu, K. R. Vijaya, Lakshmi, Radhika, Nalini, Vijayakumar, Y. G. Mahendra, Vanitha
Raja Yuvaraja	Somasundaram	Ben Surendar	Be Yess Art Films	Thiagarajan, Urvashi, Deepa, Goundamani, Senthil
Rajathi Rojakili	Rama Narayanan	Chandrabose	Niruma Creations	Rajesh, Suresh, Nalini, Sulakshana, Goundamani, Manorama, Anuradha, Senthil
Raman Sreeraman	T. K. Prasad	Sivaji Raja	R. B. Creations	Vijayakanth, Jyothi, Vanitha, Goundamani, Anuradha
Saavi	Karthik Raghunath	Gangai Amaran	Maruthi Movie Arts	Sathyaraj, Jaishankar, Saritha, Nizhalgal Ravi, Anuradha, Disco Shanti
Samaya Purathale Satchi	S. Jagadeesan	K. V. Mahadevan	Oaam Selvi Arts	Jaishankar, K. R. Vijaya, Rajesh, Nalini, Rajeev, Ilavarasi
Samudhaya Chanthaiyile	Thennavan		J. R. S. Pictures	
Santosha Kanavugal	R. C. Sakthi	Shankar–Ganesh	Thirupathiswamy Pictures	Vijayakanth, Nalini, Rajesh, Deepa, Sathyaraj
Selvi	K. Natraj	Ilaiyaraaja	Dhandayudhapani Films	Suresh, Revathi, Jeevitha
Sindhu Bhairavi	K. Balachander	Ilaiyaraaja	Kavithalayaa Productions	Sivakumar, Suhasini, Sulakshana, Janagaraj
Sivappu Nila	Rama Narayanan	Shankar–Ganesh	Murali Cine Arts	Jaishankar, Sujatha, Chandrasekhar, Suresh, Sasikala, Vanitha, S. S. Chandran
Sonna Nambamatteenga	S. Jayachandar		Mjo Movie Creations	
Sri Raghavendrar	S. P. Muthuraman	Ilaiyaraaja	Kavithalayaa Productions	Rajinikanth, K. R. Vijaya, Lakshmi, Ambika, Vishnuvardhan, Sathyaraj, Nizhalgal Ravi
Sugamana Raagangal	R. Sundarrajan	M. S. Viswanathan	Durga Bhagavathi Films	Sivakumar, Saritha, Jeevitha
Thandanai	Rama Narayanan	Chandrabose	Thirupathiswamy Pictures	Vijayakanth, Ambika, Major Sundarrajan, Jayachitra, S. S. Chandran
Thanga Mama 3D	K. Simon	Ilaiyaraaja	Filmco	Arunkumar, Sasikala
Thavam	R. C. Sakthi	Pukazhenthi	Gunachithra Productions	Lakshmi, Viswanath
Thendral Thodatha Malar	G. P. Balan	Shankar–Ganesh	V. M. S. Pictures	Rajeev, Bhanupriya
Thendrale Ennai Thodu	C. V. Sridhar	Ilaiyaraaja	Devi Royal Production	Mohan, Jayashree, Y. G. Mahendra
Thiramai	Vijai Krishnaraj	Shankar–Ganesh	Niruma Creations	Revathi, Sathyaraj, Srividya, Nizhalgal Ravi, Raveendran, Janagaraj, Senthil
Udaya Geetham	K. Rangaraj	Ilaiyaraaja	Motherland Pictures	Mohan, Lakshmi, Revathi, Anand Babu, Goundamani, Senthil
Un Kannil Neer Vazhinthal...	Balu Mahendra	Ilaiyaraaja	Kalakendra Movies	Rajinikanth, Madhavi, Y. G. Mahendra
Unakkaga Oru Roja	C. V. Rajendran	T. Rajendar	Jaisakthi Combines	Mohan, Ambika, Suresh, Rajeev, Viji, Anuradha
Unnai Thedi Varuven	C. V. Sridhar	Ilaiyaraaja	K. R. G. Film Circuit	Suresh, Nalini, Nizhalgal Ravi, Sadhana, Manorama
Unnai Vidamatten	Nethaji	M. S. Viswanathan	Jepiyar Pictures	Nizhalgal Ravi, Viji, Poornima Rao
Urimai	Rama Narayanan	Ilaiyaraaja	M. A. H. Creations	Suresh, Nalini, Radha Ravi
Uthami	M. Vellaichami	Shankar–Ganesh	Maruthi Movie Arts	Rajesh, Sujatha, Sangeetha
Uyarndha Ullam	S. P. Muthuraman	Ilaiyaraaja	AVM Productions	Kamal Haasan, Ambika, Radha Ravi, Nithya, Janagaraj, Kovai Sarala
Veli	Durai	Shankar–Ganesh	Sunitha Cine Arts	Rajesh, Jaishankar, Saritha, Sumithra, Sathyaraj, Janagaraj, Vanitha
Vellai Manasu	Gopu	Shankar–Ganesh	Filmco	Y. G. Mahendra, Ramya Krishnan, Disco Shanti
Vesham	Rama Narayanan	Shankar–Ganesh	P. S. V. Films	Arjun, Ilavarasi, Goundamani, Senthil
Vetrikani	M. R. Vijaychander	Shankar–Ganesh	Jai Geetha Movies	Anand Babu, Jeevitha, Raveendran, Vanitha, Janagaraj, Senthil
Vilangu Meen	Jayadevi	Shyam	Thulasi International	Hariprasad, Sulakshana
Viswanathan Velai Venum	Raghuram	Shankar–Ganesh	Janani Films	Karthik, Anand Babu, Jeevitha, Anitha
Yaar?	Sakthi Kannan	V. S. Narasimhan	Kalaipuli Films	Arjun, Nalini, Jaishankar, Jayachitra, Nizhalgal Ravi, Senthil
Yaro Azhaikirargal	Rajan Sarma	Shankar–Ganesh	Dattatreya Creation	Guru, Arundhati
Yemaatrathe Yemaaraathe	V. C. Guhanathan	Chandrabose	United Cine Technicians	Vijayakanth, Archana, Anuradha, Vijayakumar, Sumithra
