= Dharma Pathini =

Dharma Pathini may refer to:

- Dharma Pathini (1986 film), a 1986 Tamil-language Indian film
- Dharmapatni (1987 film), a 1987 Telugu language film
- Dharma Pathini (1941 film), a 1941 Telugu language film
