= Pudhu Pudhu Ragangal =

- Theatrical release poster
- Directed by: V. Aadhavan
- Written by: Pandiyan (dialogues)
- Screenplay by: Amudha Durairaj
- Story by: Amudha Durairaj
- Produced by: B. Vedapuri
- Starring: Sithara; Anand Babu
- Cinematography: Vipindas
- Edited by: V. P. Krishnan
- Music by: S. A. Rajkumar
- Production company: Deivanai Movies
- Release date: 16 November 1990
- Country: India
- Language: Tamil

Pudhu Pudhu Ragangal (transl. New ragas) is a 1990 Indian Tamil-language romantic drama film directed by V. Aadhavan. It stars Sithara and Anand Babu. The film was released on 1 November 1990.

== Plot ==
Searching for a livelihood, Kanika and her mother arrive in a fishing hamlet. The locals too extend their support to the women. But several, intriguing twists and turns follow in their lives.

== Cast ==
- Sithara as Kanika
- Anand Babu as Babu
- Charan Raj as Sarath
- Vijayalakshmi Navaneethakrishnan
- Nagesh
- M. N. Nambiar as Abdullah
- V. K. Ramasamy as James
- Delhi Ganesh
- Rajesh
- Uday Prakash
- Charle
- Manorama
- Kumarimuthu
- Gundu Kalyanam

== Soundtrack ==
Soundtrack was composed by S. A. Rajkumar.

Song	Singers	Lyrics
"Solli Koduthal" (Happy)	K. S. Chithra	S. A. Rajkumar
"Solli Koduthal" (Sad)	K. S. Chithra,Swarnalatha	S. A. Rajkumar
"Thirunaal Vanthathuda"	S. A. Rajkumar, P. Jayachandran	S. A. Rajkumar
"Summa Keluga"	Sunandha, Dr. Vijayalakshmi Navaneethakrishnan	S. A. Rajkumar
"Kottum Mazhai"	K. S. Chithra	Vaali
"Kunjithan Kunjithan"	Anitha Suresh	Vaali
"Adada Adada Naanthan"	Mano	Vaali
"Maalai Maayagiruchu"	Vijayalakshmi Navaneethakrishnan	Vijayalakshmi Navaneethakrishnan
"Ela Vetkamalla"	Vijayalakshmi Navaneethakrishnan	Vijayalakshmi Navaneethakrishnan

== Release and reception ==
Pudhu Pudhu Ragangal was released on 16 November 1990. N. Krishnaswamy of The Indian Express wrote, "The story line tends to ramble and one does not understand whats going on for some time". C. R. K. of Kalki called the film a different raga.

Aadhavan later launched another film titled Anbe Diana in 1999 starring Udhai and Mehr Hassan, but the film did not release. A second film with Udhai titled Priya Vidai also failed to develop post production.
