= Vidya Vasula Aham =

- Promotional release poster
- Directed by: Manikanth Gelli
- Written by: Venkatesh Rowthu
- Screenplay by: Manikanth Gelli
- Produced by: Navya Mahesh M. Ranjith Kumar Kodali; Chandana Katta
- Starring: Rahul Vijay; Shivani Rajashekar
- Cinematography: Akhil Valluri
- Edited by: Satya Giduturi
- Music by: Kalyani Malik
- Production companies: Eternity Entertainment; Thanvika Jashwika Creations
- Distributed by: Aha
- Release date: 17 May 2024
- Running time: 103 minutes
- Country: India
- Language: Telugu

Vidya Vasula Aham (transl. Vidya and Vasu's Ego)is a 2024 Indian Telugu-language romantic comedy film directed by Manikanth Gelli and starring Rahul Vijay and Shivani Rajashekar. The film was premiered on 17 May 2024 on Aha.

== Plot ==
The story starts in Vaikuntam, Narada pays a visit to Lord Vishnu and Goddess Lakshmi shares his observations on relationship between husband and wife on whole world. Being a lover of making quarrels between people, Narada makes sarcasm on Lakshmi by saying husbands on earth are very clever who makes their wives slaves through love. After hearing this Lakshmi eyebrowed looking at her husband. Sensing a quarrel between them Vishnu interrupts and asks Narada what marriage is about? After observing several pairs on earth, Lakshmi asks Vishnu to show her a marriage story instead of a love story. Then Vishnu focuses on the protagonists Vidya and Vasu and how ego plays a key role in their marital life.

Then, the story shifts to earth. Vidya is an IT professional, and Vasu is a mechanical engineer. Both are completely opposite to each other but having a common thing, I.e. ego. After liking their attitudes through a traditional date, they both entered into an arranged marriage. Vidya is very cautious on finance, unlike Vasu is negligent. Despite having differences and their ego issues, soon they fell in love. After having an increment issues with his manager, Vasu resigns his job unknown to Vidya, who doesn't want to share with his wife for an ego clash. After a month, his finances are completely nill no option left he reveals his situation to Vidya. Then Vidya gives pocket money to him and takes whole financial control of their home. Vasu also steps out his ego for a while and started helping her in home.

One day their parents suddenly come for a visit, the husband and wife secretly comes to an understanding that not to quarrel in front of them. Slowly both help each other in housework and understand each other more but their ego also increases along with it and they quarrels secretly. Later at dinner time Vidya unknowingly reveals Vasu's resignation to their in laws. Vasu's father is about to angry on him but suddenly to manage the situation Vidya comes to his rescue and supports her husband's decision saying following the passion, which is better rather than doing the disinterested job and it is her advice to resign the job wishes soon he finds out his passion. Then to her surprise Vasu reveals he is working on a startup plan. Later at midnight the husband and wife discuss about his startup plan. Then Vidya gives her entire savings to her husband and says she don't know whether she is a good wife or not but she always thinks about her husband's well-being. Then suddenly Vasu surprised her with a diamond ring bought through his entire PF and Last month's salary thus realising that day is her birthday. Then Vasu replies that though having ego they have mutual understanding between them which overcomes it and protects their bond. Thus, to satisfy his ego Vasu accepts the amount but not as his wife but as a partner in his startup.

Finally film ends with Narada takes leave from them with a satisfied message that "Mutual respect is a foundation for a good marriage." Then to satisfy Lakshmi's ego Vishnu starts pressing her toes.

== Cast ==
- Shivani Rajashekar as Inukollu Vidya
- Rahul Vijay as Vasu
- Srinivas Avasarala as Lord Vishnu
- Abhinaya as Goddess Lakshmi
- Srinivasa Reddy as Narada
- Tanikella Bharani in a Cameo Appearance as a Spiritual Preacher
- Mounika Reddy as Vidya's colleague
- Ravi Varma Adduri as Vasu's father
- Y. Kasi Viswanath as Vidya's father
- Rupa Lakshmi as Vasu's mother
- Rajasri Nair as Vidya's mother
- Viva Raghava
- Raghu Babu as Vasu's boss

== Release and reception ==
Vidya Vasula Aham was initially scheduled for a theatrical release, but was later released as a direct-to-video film on Aha.

BH Harsha of The New Indian Express gave a rating of 2.5 out of 5 and opined that the screenplay is "disjointed, which prevents the film from exploring a commentary on modern relationship". While praising the performance of lead actors, News18 stated that, "the movie lacks the amalgamation of drama and humour. The director failed to harness these qualities in the movie".
