= Suryakantham (film) =

- Theatrical release poster
- Directed by: Pranith Bramandapally
- Produced by: Sundeep Yerramreddy; Srujan Yarabolu
- Starring: Niharika Konidela; Rahul Vijay; Perlene Bhesania
- Cinematography: Hari Jasthi
- Edited by: Ravi Teja Girijala
- Music by: Mark K. Robin
- Production company: Nirvana Cinemas
- Release date: 29 March 2019
- Country: India
- Language: Telugu

Suryakantham is a 2019 Indian Telugu-language romantic drama film starring Niharika Konidela, Rahul Vijay, and Perlene Bhesania. The film is produced by American-based Yerramreddy and Yarabolu under the banner of Nirvana Cinemas.

== Cast ==
- Niharika Konidela as Suryakantham
  - Akshara Kishor as the child Suryakantham
- Rahul Vijay as Abhi
- Perlene Bhesania as Pooja
- Suhasini Maniratnam as Supriya, Suryakantham's mother
- Satya as Sunny
- Sivaji Raja as Abhi's father
- Madhumani as Abhi's mother
- Nayani Pavani as Meera, Suryakantham's friend
- Koteshwar Rao as Pooja's father
- Rupa Lakshmi as Pooja's mother

== Soundtrack ==
Suryakantham

Soundtrack album by Mark K Robin
- Released: 2019
- Recorded: 2019
- Genre: Soundtrack
- Producer: Mark K Robin

Mark K Robin chronology
Veera Bhoga Vasantha Rayalu (2018)	Suryakantham (2019)	Mallesham (2019)

The songs were composed by Mark K Robin.

All lyrics are written by Krishna Kanth.

No.	Title	Singer(s)	Length
1.	"Inthena Inthena"	Sid Sriram, Shakthisree Gopalan
2.	"Biscuit"	Mounika Reddy
3.	"Po Pove"	Karthik
4.	"Breaking My Heart"	Sunitha Sarathy
5.	"Nenena Nenena"	Shakthisree Gopalan, Sid Sriram
6.	"Friday Night Baby"	Roll Rida (rap portions), Anurag Kulkarni, Harika Narayan

== Release ==
The Times of India gave the film two-and-a-half stars out of five and wrote that "The good news is, Niharika is a revelation as Suryakantham, a character that is a refreshing change from the kinds of damsel-in-distresses TFI [Telugu film industry] usually seems to offer". The Hindu wrote that "The plot is nothing new, and by the end of the film, it feels like another web series put up on the big screen". The New Indian Express gave the film two out of five stars and wrote that "With a strong first half, it is a shame that Pranith couldn’t keep up the expectations in the second half aside from a couple of high moments". The Hans India wrote, "The movie has a weak story and draggy scenes which are the minus points. Overall, Suryakantham is a good film but can be watched only once."
