= Shivathmika Rajashekar =

Indian actress

- Born: 22 April 2000 (age 26); Hyderabad, India (now in Telangana, India)
- Occupation: Actress
- Years active: 2019 — present
- Parents: Rajasekhar (father); Jeevitha (mother)
- Family: Shivani Rajashekar (sister)

Shivathmika Rajashekar is an Indian actress who appears primarily in Telugu and Tamil films. She is a recipient of the SIIMA Award for Best Female Debut for Dorasaani.

== Early life ==
Shivathmika Rajashekar was born on 22 April 2000, in Hyderabad, India. She is the younger daughter of actors Rajasekhar and Jeevitha. She began working in cinema after finishing her 12th grade studies.

== Career ==
Shivathmika debuted with Dorasaani alongside Anand Deverakonda; it opened to an underwhelming response from the critics. However, her performance received a favourable reception, and she received the Sakshi Excellence Award for Best Debutant, the Santosham Film Awards for Best Debut Actress, and the SIIMA Award for Best Female Debut – Telugu. Her second release, Anandham Vilayadum Veedu, marking her Tamil debut opposite Gautham Karthik, received a mixed response. She then starred in the Tamil film Nitham Oru Vaanam, playing one of the three female leads opposite Ashok Selvan. The film had a positive critical response. Her subsequent releases were Panchathantram and Ranga Maarthaanda.

== Filmography ==
List of films and roles
Year	Title	Role	Language	Notes	Ref.
2019	Dorasaani	Devaki Reddy	Telugu	SIIMA Award for Best Female Debut – Telugu; Santosham Best Debut Actress	
2021	Anandham Vilayadum Veedu	Viji	Tamil		
2022	Shekar	—N/a	Telugu	As co-producer	
2022	Nitham Oru Vaanam	Meenakshi	Tamil		
2022	Panchathantram	Lekha	Telugu	Segment: "Subha-Lekha"	
2023	Ranga Maarthaanda	Bangaram	Telugu		
2025	Bomb	Prabha	Tamil		
2025	Aaromaley	Anjali	Tamil		
2026	City of Gold		Tamil		
2026	VISA: Vintara Saradaga		Telugu		
2026	Chitravanam		Telugu		
2026	ENE Repeat	Keerthana	Telugu		
