= Shekar (film) =

- Theatrical release poster
- Directed by: Jeevitha Rajashekar
- Written by: Lakshmi Bhupala
- Screenplay by: Jeevitha Rajashekar
- Based on: Joseph (Malayalam) by M. Padmakumar
- Produced by: Beeram Sudhakara Reddy; Shivani Rajashekar; Shivathmika Rajashekar; Boggaram Venkata Srinivas
- Starring: Rajasekhar; Athmiya Rajan
- Cinematography: Mallikarjun Naragani
- Edited by: Garry BH
- Music by: Anup Rubens
- Production companies: Pegasus Cinecorp LLP; Taurus Cinecorp; Sudhakar Impex IPL; Tripura Creations
- Release date: 20 May 2022
- Country: India
- Language: Telugu

Shekar is a 2022 Indian Telugu-language thriller film directed by Jeevitha Rajashekar. A remake of the Malayalam film Joseph (2018), the film stars Rajashekar and Athmiya Rajan, who reprises her role from the original. This film marks Jeevitha's return to direction after a break.

== Plot ==
A retired police officer with adept investigative skills, gets involved in a crime case after his ex-wife's unexpected demise.

== Cast ==
- Rajashekar as Shekar
- Athmiya Rajan as Indu, wife of Shekar
- Muskaan Khubchandhani
- Shivani Rajashekar as Shekar's daughter
- Kishore as Mallikarjun
- Posani Krishna Murali
- Sameer
- Abhinav Gomatam
- Bharani Shankar
- Shravan Raghavendra
- Ravi Varma Adduri as Shekar's friend
- Prakash Raj as an advocate (cameo appearance)

== Production ==
The film was initially announced with newcomer Lalith as the director. The film is the first time Rajasekhar is in a film with both his wife Jeevitha and daughter Shivani.

== Soundtrack ==
All music is composed by Anup Rubens.

Sekhar Soundtrack
No.	Title	Lyrics	Singer(s)	Length
1.	"Love Gante"	Chandra Bose	Vijay Prakash, Anup Rubens, Revanth	04:09
2.	"Kinnera"	Ananta Sriram	Armaan Malik	04:38
3.	"Chinni Chinni Praanam"	Ramajogayya Sastry	Chinmayi, Hymath Mohammed, Haripriya	5:13
4.	"Satyam Shivam Sundharam"	Ramajogayya Sastry	Vijay Yesudas, Uma Neha	04:23
Total length:				22:25

== Release ==
The film was scheduled to release on Sankranthi but was delayed and released on 20 May 2022.

Following the film's release, financer A. Parandhama Reddy approached the city civil court in Hyderabad, and petitioned that Jeevitha and Rajashekar have failed to repay the loan of ₹65 lakh. As the makers failed to repay payback the loan within the given deadline, the court halted the screening of film on 22 May 2022, attaching its world negative rights. Actor Rajasekhar responded through Twitter that "some people have conspired and stopped our film from screening." As of 24 May 2022, the court allowed the screening of the film.

== Reception ==
Prakash Pecheti of Telangana Today wrote that "Though Shekar does vary from the Malayalam styke [sic] of making, the Telugu version is a stimulating drama. Jeevitha deftly steers the film to perfection by staying true to the original". Sangeetha Devi Dundoo of The Hindu opined that "Shekar is a detour from the norm for Telugu cinema and is an earnest attempt. If only it had more spark in the performances and better music". Thadhagath Pathi of The Times of India stated that "the film manages to hold its own despite a few tweaks, sticking to the soul of the original".
