= Rahul Vijay =

Indian actor

- Occupation: Actor
- Years active: 2018–present

Rahul Vijay is an Indian actor who predominantly works in Telugu films.

== Early life ==
Rahul was born in Chennai to Vijay (stunt master).

== Career ==
Rahul made his film debut with the romantic drama Ee Maaya Peremito (2018). His next film was the female-centric Suryakantham (2019). In a review of the film by The Times of India, the reviewer wrote, "Rahul Vijay as Abhi seems to have improved from his previous film and brings honesty to his character". Rahul went on to star in the Tamil and Telugu remakes of College Kumar, a Kannada movie. He is currently preparing for his next film Panchathantram, a drama movie written and directed by Harsha Pulipaka and started shooting for his next collaborating with Megha Akash and Sushanth Reddy for the second time after Dear Megha.

== Filmography ==
Key
†	Denotes films that have not yet been released

- Note: all films are in Telugu, unless otherwise noted.

Year	Film	Role	Notes	ref
2018	Ee Maaya Peremito	Sri Ramachandra Murthy "Chandu"	Debut film; Nominated–SIIMA Award for Best Debut Actor	
2019	Suryakantham	Abhi		
2020	College Kumar	Shiva	Simultaneously shot in Tamil	
2022	Panchathantram	Subash	Under segment "Subha-Lekha"	
2023	Kota Bommali PS	P.C Satharu Ravi Kumar		
2024	Vidya Vasula Aham	Vasu	Released on Aha	

=== Streaming television ===
Year	Film	Role	Platform	Notes	Ref
2021	Kudi Yedamaithe	Aadhi	Aha	Web Debut	
2024	Yakshini	Krishna	Disney+Hotstar		
