= Kanna Thorakkanum Saami =

- VCD cover
- Directed by: R. Govindraj
- Screenplay by: K. Bhagyaraj
- Story by: Dasari Narayana Rao
- Produced by: Sulur Kalaipithan
- Starring: Sivakumar; Jeevitha
- Cinematography: Baby Philips
- Edited by: S. Mani
- Music by: Ilaiyaraaja; Gangai Amaran
- Production company: Punitha Cine Arts
- Release date: 18 April 1986
- Country: India
- Language: Tamil

Kanna Thorakkanum Saami (transl. Open your eyes, man) is a 1986 Indian Tamil-language film directed by R.Govindraj and written by K. Bhagyaraj. The film stars Sivakumar and Jeevitha. It was released on 18 April 1986. The film was a remake of the Telugu film Nenu Maa Aavida. The tile of this film is derived from Mundhanai Mudichu with the music composed by Ilaiyaraaja.

== Plot ==
Sekhar arrives in Chennai to attend a job interview and lands the job. Distant relatives Venu and his wife Usha, help him get settled. He rents a room at Sooru Subbamma's house by lying that he is married and that his wife will join him at the end of the month. Subbamma insists on seeing a photograph of his wife and also insists that he write letters to his wife. Sekhar gets a picture of a random woman and sends letters to a fictitious address. He's in for a major shock when Sumathi, his imagined wife, shows up at the house. Sumathi insists that she is Sekhar's wife and he can't kick her out without Subbamma learning of his duplicity. Subbamma is also close to his boss so if she learns the truth, he would be out of a home and lose his job. Sumathi for her part insists that she is, in fact, his wife. She also knows so many details of his life that everyone around Sekhar, including Venu who helped him in the initial duplicity, believes her. After some initial fighting, Sekhar comes to see Sumathi's kindness and genuine affection for him. He falls in love with her and wishes to make their false marriage into a real one. However, Sumathi has many secrets and several enemies that threaten the couple's happiness. Sekhar and Sumathi must confront these blockades to earn their happily ever after.

== Cast ==
- Sivakumar as Sekhar
- Jeevitha as Sumathi
- Cho Ramaswamy as Venu
- Manorama as Sooru Subbamma
- Suryakanth
- K. K. Soundar
- Idichapuli Selvaraj
- S. Rajini
- Mannangatti Subramaniam
- G. Ramli
- Kovai Senthil
- V. Sekhar (uncredited role)

== Production ==
The film was launched at Pandaribai Temple at Kodambakkam. The scenes involving Sivakumar and Jeevitha were shot there while other scenes of them were shot at Prakash Studios on the same day.

== Soundtrack ==
The soundtrack was composed by Ilaiyaraaja and Gangai Amaran.

| Song | Singers | Lyrics |
|---|---|---|
| "Ithuthaan Mudhal Irava" | Malaysia Vasudevan, P. Susheela | Vaali |
| "Neramachi Vaa Pulla" | Malaysia Vasudevan, S. Janaki | Chinnakonar |
| "Andhi Maalayile" | Deepan Chakravarthy, S. Janaki | Vairamuthu |
| "Ennendru Solvadhu" | K. J. Yesudas, P. Susheela | Pulamaipithan |

== Critical reception ==
Kalki called the film two hours of worthy entertainment.
