= Oliyum Oliyum (film) =

- poster
- Directed by: Shakthi Chellam
- Produced by: Sivakumar; Rajeev Venkataraman
- Starring: Prabha; Aswati; Anand Babu; Pragathi
- Music by: Yanidesh
- Production company: Dandini Creations
- Release date: 19 June 2009
- Country: India
- Language: Tamil

Oliyum Oliyum (transl. Light and sound) is a 2009 Indian Tamil-language film directed by Shakthi Chellam and starring Prabha, Aswati, Anand Babu and Pragathi. The film was released to extremely negative reviews.

== Cast ==
- Prabha as Ramu
- Aswati as Selvi
- Anand Babu as Ramu's elder brother
- Pragathi as Ramu's sister-in-law
- Mohan as Gopal
- Palam Kalyanasundaram as Constable Govindaswamy
- Scissor Manohar as Mookuthi and Pannari
- Geetha as Poonkodi

== Production ==
Shakthi Chellam previously directed the documentary titled The Real Salute based on police officer Kiran Bedi. The film is set in pre-Independence India and is produced by NRIs Sivakumar and Rajeev Venkataraman. The film marks the return of Anand Babu in the lead role after a hiatus. The film features social worker Balam Kalyanasundaram and was shot at Ramoji Film City.

== Music ==
The music for the film was composed by Yanidesh. The lyrics were penned by Sakthi Chellam.

Track listing
No.	Title	Singer(s)	Length
1.	"Intro"	Sakthi Chellam	0:40
2.	"Yelavadhu Pondatiye"	Tambi, Mimicry Senthil	2:10
3.	"Maattikkitaanda Raamu"	Sai	0:40
4.	"Kadhalika Porendi"	Tippu	2:14
5.	"Paithiyam Pidikidu"	Madhu Balakrishnan	3:50
6.	"Mukka Mozham"	Tippu	1:22
7.	"Machakari"	Sai	0:48
8.	"India India"	Sirkazhi G. Sivachidambaram	1:44
9.	"Bambarakattai"	Tippu, Sai	2:52
10.	"Engadi Pona"	Madhu Balakrishnan	0:31
11.	"Paithiyam Pidikidu (short)"	Madhu Balakrishnan	0:50
Total length:			17:41

== Reception ==
Pavithra Srinivasan from Rediff.com rated the film zero out of five stars and opined that "With all these ingredients, you're definitely guaranteed a riot of humour with a production like this".
