= Mounam Kalaikirathu =

- Poster
- Directed by: Kundrai Vaendan Karikalan
- Produced by: Devaraj; Mani; Kundrai Vaendan Karikalan
- Starring: Suresh; Jeevitha; Anand Babu; Jayashree
- Music by: Shankar–Ganesh
- Production company: HMC Productions
- Release date: 12 December 1986
- Country: India
- Language: Tamil

Mounam Kalaikirathu (transl. Silence is fading) is a 1986 Indian Tamil-language romance film directed by Kundrai Vaendan Karikalan. The film stars Suresh, Jeevitha, Anand Babu, Jayashree, Vijayakumar, Chinni Jayanth and S. S. Chandran. It was released on 12 December 1986.

== Plot ==
Rajesh and Deepa are lovers, but Kannan too loves Deepa without knowing of her relationship with Rajesh. Shobana, a doctor, loves Kannan as well. The film explores these relationships and finally breaks the ice of silence.

== Cast ==
- Suresh as Kannan
- Jeevitha as Deepa
- Anand Babu as Rajesh
- Jayashree as Shobana
- Vijayakumar
- Chinni Jayanth
- S. S. Chandran
- Senthil

== Production ==
Anand Babu's voice was dubbed by S. N. Surendar.

== Soundtrack ==
The music was composed by Shankar–Ganesh.

Track listing
No.	Title	Singer(s)	Length
1.	"Vaadi Ambigaiye"	S. P. Balasubrahmanyam, Chorus
2.	"Kannan Yaarukku"	P. Susheela
3.	"Kannan Radhaikku" (Pathos)	Ramesh
4.	"Anbe"	Vani Jairam, Chorus
5.	"Instrumental Tunes"	—
6.	"Maalai Neram"	Ramesh, Uma Ramanan
7.	"Engemma Nee Pora"	S. P. Balasubrahmanyam, S. P. Sailaja
8.	"Anbe" (Pathos)	Vani Jairam

== Reception ==
The Indian Express wrote, "The narration is made in a naturalistic vein and is not boring. The performances are credible" and concluded that Shankar–Ganesh "have come up with some pleasant tunes".
