= Kundrai Vaendan Karikalan =

Indian film director and producer

- Born: T. Kallikulam (Tirunelveli Dist) Tamil Nadu, India
- Occupations: Film producer, director, screenwriter
- Years active: 1984-present

Kundrai Vaendan Karikalan (born 21 August 1956) is an Indian film director and producer primarily working in the Chennai film industry. He directed Mounam Kalaikirathu.

He worked as associate for directors like Mahendran, R. Pattabi Ramam, R. Sundarrajan, Kiruba Shanker and K. S. Madhagan. He worked on films like Gayathri with Rajinikanth, Evargal Vithiyasamanavargal with Sivachandran, Poonagaram with Shoba and Sarath Babu and films like Ennadi Meenachi, Golusu, Athavida Ragasiyam and Saranalayam.

== Current status ==
After a long break, Kundrai Vaendan Karikalan is making a comeback to Chennai film industry by directing a film named Thaaimaie. Shooting was expected to begin in April 2013.

== Filmography ==
- Mounam Kalaikirathu (1986)
- Gayathri (with Rajinikanth)
- Evargal Vithiyasamanavargal (with Sivachandran)
- Poonagaram (with Shoba and Sarath Babu)
- Ennadi Meenachi
- Golusu
- Athavida Ragasiyam
- Saranalayam
