= Kota Bommali PS =

- Theatrical release poster
- Directed by: Teja Marni
- Written by: Teja Marni
- Based on: Nayattu (2021) by Martin Prakkat
- Produced by: Bunny Vas; Vidya Koppineedi; Bhanu Pratapa; Riyaz Chowdary
- Starring: Srikanth; Varalaxmi Sarathkumar; Rahul Vijay; Shivani Rajashekar; Murali Sharma
- Cinematography: Jagadeesh Cheekati
- Edited by: Karthika Srinivas
- Music by: Ranjin Raj; Midhun Mukundan
- Production company: GA2 Pictures
- Release date: 24 November 2023
- Running time: 138 minutes
- Country: India
- Language: Telugu

Kota Bommali PS is a 2023 Indian Telugu language political survival thriller film written and directed by Teja Marni. It is a remake of the 2021 Malayalam film Nayattu and stars Srikanth, Varalaxmi Sarathkumar, Rahul Vijay, Shivani Rajashekar, and Murali Sharma. It was theatrically released on 24 November 2023.

== Plot ==
Ravi, the son of a deceased police officer, joins the police force in the Kota Bommali station as a constable and is asked to assist the Head Constable Rama Krishna; Rama Krishna was a colleague of Ravi's father and hence befriends him quickly. They, along with other policemen, are assigned to provide security for the upcoming by-election in Tekkali, which the ruling part takes seriously as the victory would ensure good reputation and potential statewide re-election.

A local political goon named Munna, who is related to another newly recruited constable Kumari, is summoned for harassing her one night. Ravi and Rama Krishna get into a scuffle with Munna and his friends and lock him up in the cell. However, Munna is later released without charges due to his affiliation with the ruling party. After attending a wedding, Rama Krishna and Ravi are drunk, joined by Kumari, who accepts a lift. With Rama Krishna's nephew Rahul as driver, they get into a collision with a motorbike. They move to assist after realizing that the bike rider is Raja Rao, a friend of Munna and also one of the dominant low caste group in the constituency.

Rahul flees from the scene immediately, after which the trio gets spotted by civilians. They attempt to rescue the bike rider, who is announced dead on arrival. This sends Munna's gang into a rage, forcing the trio to flee to their station. At the station, Rama Krishna realizes that they will be accused of murder and arrested soon, resulting in the trio fleeing and on the run. The CM gets involved in the matter due to an impending by-election where the support of the Dalit organization is crucial for victory. The home minister of the state Barisela Jayaraj, who is directed to ensure the victory in the by-elections, promises to bring the trio to justice and assigns the case to a squad of police officers led by SP Razia Ali. With political pressure mounting on the police to frame them, the trio retreat to a village in Orissa to seek asylum with an old acquaintance of Rama Krishna.

Ali and her squad manages to locate the runaways, but cannot launch an assault due to the strategic location of their hiding place and due to the presence of the naxalite groups. Learning about Rama Krishna's experience as a greyhounds officer who has encountered some of the native naxalites' associates, Ali teams up with them and asks them to kill Rama Krishna, and bring the other two to her unharmed. However, Rama Krishna foils their plans, which makes Ali realise that he knows about their presence and has strategically planned all defenses. As the by-election is nearing, the police decide to stage a drama with the allowance of the ruling party and announce that the trio are arrested, and parades dummies with faces covered to the media. However, when Rama Krishna's daughter calls him a dishonest officer, the former reveals to the duo how he was forced to carry out the killing of her friend's father due to pressure from higher officials, and has ever since regretted the same because of her growing spite towards him. The next morning, when the squad finally makes the move, Ravi and Kumari run, only to find Rama Krishna hanging dead on a tree with a suicide video note in his mobile phone as a dying declaration. Due to the previous dummy arrest and Jayaraj refusing to provide any further support, Ali and the squad are in trouble.

Ravi tries to escape to safeguard the suicide video but is captured and is arrested along with Kumari and is brought to the police club along with Rama Krishna's body. The police officers stage Rama Krishna's suicide in the police custody and compels the other two to give corroborating statements, which make Rama Krishna responsible for the death of the Dalit youth and thus making them free of the crime. Ravi and Kumari both refuse, saying Rama Krishna's family deserves to know the truth, and they are given time to change their mind till they reach the court. They are later placed in custody and transported to court in a police van as the voting for the by-elections take place.

At the court, one of Rama Krishna's colleagues, who also received the suicide video note along with Ali, produces the same as evidence. In the video, Rama Krishna explained the whole incident to the judge and claims it is an accident, then he requested to conduct a proper investigation by CBI regarding the issue and do justice for Ravi and Kumari. Then the judge orders to acquit Ravi and Kumari and after observing the facts and evidence, the judge considers that SP Razia Ali had tried to manipulate the evidence and basing on Rama Krishna's dying declaration orders CBI to investigate into it, until then Ali will be under suspension and face the inquiry to the appropriate commission.

Later, Rama Krishna's colleague sends another message to Ali that he had suspected that she might delete the videos of both sides by destroying their phones. That is why he sent the videos to his colleague and deleted the videos in the What's app history and warns her to face the inquiry commission. Later, Rama Krishna sends another video to his daughter and apologizes for his act towards her. He claims he was innocent, and to protect justice, he decided to become evidence by committing suicide.

The films ends with Jayaraj lecturing a guilt-ridden Ali that to protect power from these mindless and negligent people who are selling their votes for freebies, money and caste there is necessary to do the certain collateral damage and assures her that having 42 MPs in Parliament he can pressure CBI also to make the case loose.

== Cast ==
- Srikanth as Head Constable Chintada Rama Krishna
- Rahul Vijay as P.C Satharu Ravi Kumar
- Shivani Rajashekar as P.C Malleti Kumari
- Varalaxmi Sarathkumar as SP Razia Ali IPS
- Murali Sharma as Home Minister Barisela Jayaraj
- Praveen as Durga Rao
- Banerjee as Kurma Rao
- Dayanand Reddy as ACP
- Vishnu Oi as Raja Rao, who dies in the accident
- Pavan Tej Konidela as S. Munna
- Rama Rao Jadhav as Senior Police Officer
- Nalla Sreedhar Reddy Gabbar as Circle Inspector

== Reception ==
Jeevi from Idlebrain.com wrote: "This is a film that adds some commercial angle and heroic elevation to the remake without impacting the soul/sanctity of the original. On the whole, Kota Bommali PS is worth a watch if you like watching realistic thrillers". Shekhar Kusuma from Telugu Samayam wrote: "Overall 'Kotabommali PS' is a thrilling hunter ... Just like the song Lingi Lingi Lingidi, the movie will please the audience". A reviewer of Sakshi.com wrote "Overall, 'Kotabommali PS' gives you the feeling of watching a good movie". A reviewer of Eenadu says "He pointed out the flaws in the political system. Even if there are minor flaws in the second half, the overall film is impressive".
