= Jilebi (2023 film) =

Indian film

- Directed by: K. Vijaya Bhaskar
- Screenplay by: K. Vijaya Bhaskar
- Based on: Adi Kapyare Kootamani (2015)
- Produced by: Gunturu Rama Krishna; Anju Asrani
- Starring: Sree Kamal; Shivani Rajashekar; Rajendra Prasad; Murli Sharma
- Cinematography: Satish Muthyala
- Edited by: M. R. Varma
- Music by: Mani Sharma
- Production company: Anju Asrani Kreations
- Release date: 18 August 2023
- Country: India
- Language: Telugu

Jilebi is a 2023 Indian Telugu-language film written and directed by K. Vijaya Bhaskar. It is produced by Gunturu Rama Krishna, Anju Asrani, under the banner of Anju Asrani Kreations. The film stars Sree Kamal, Shivani Rajashekar, Rajendra Prasad, Murli Sharma in supporting roles. The film is a remake of the 2015 Malayalam film Adi Kapyare Kootamani.

The music was composed by Mani Sharma with cinematography by Sathish Muthyala and editing by MR Varma. It was released on 18 August 2023.

== Plot ==
The plot centers on Kamal, an engineering student, who leads a carefree life with his friends in their hostel. The story takes a comedic turn when Kamal decides to help a girl named Lakshmi, also known as Jilebi, sneak into the boys' hostel. Lakshmi, whose full name is J Lakshmi Bharathi, is portrayed as a spirited girl trying to break free from her overbearing father, MLA Rudra Pratap Rana. She seeks Kamal's assistance for a seemingly simple task that spirals into a series of misadventures.

Once inside the hostel, Lakshmi's presence leads to a cascade of humorous and chaotic situations. The group of friends, including Bujji, Bobby, and Washington, must navigate the challenges of keeping her hidden from the stern hostel warden, Dhairyam, all while dealing with the daily rigors of college life. The screenplay is filled with slapstick humor, misunderstandings, and the camaraderie of youth, making the film a celebration of friendship and mischief.

As the plot progresses, the film introduces elements of romance and drama. Kamal and Lakshmi's interactions hint at a budding romance, but this is intertwined with the comedic attempts to manage her undercover stay in the hostel. The friends' efforts to protect Lakshmi from her father's wrath, who disapproves of her mingling with boys, add layers to the narrative, blending humor with a touch of sentimentality.

The climax of "Jilebi" takes an unexpected turn with an infusion of horror-comedy, where black magic plays a part in the resolution of the chaotic scenario. This twist not only heightens the comedic effect but also leads to a satisfying conclusion where Kamal and his friends successfully ensure Lakshmi's escape from the hostel, teaching a lesson on friendship, independence, and the spirit of youth.

Supporting characters like the warden Dhairyam, with his strict yet often outwitted demeanor, contribute significantly to the film's humor. The movie is noted for its ensemble cast, each bringing their unique flavor to the story, ensuring that "Jilebi" remains a memorable comedy in Telugu cinema, aimed at entertaining families and college-goers alike.

== Cast ==
- Sree Kamal as Kamal
- Shivani Rajashekar as G Lakshmi Bharathi
- Rajendra Prasad as Dhairyam
- Murli Sharma as MLA Rudra Pratap Rana, Lakshmi's father
- Getup Srinu
- Gundu Sudarshan
- Bithiri Sathi
- Bodupalli Srinu as Paidithalli
- Sai Kumar Babloo as Bujji
- Ankith Koyya as Bobby
- Viva Sunny as Washington
- Chammak Chandra as auto driver Nani

== Soundtrack ==
All lyrics are written by Ramajogayya Sastry; all music is composed by Mani Sharma.

Track listing
No.	Title	Singer(s)	Length
1.	"Hot Hot Ra"	Dinker Kavala, MaaHaa	4:14
2.	"Aaku Paku"	Rahul Sipligunj	3:58
3.	"Hey Madhumathi"	Dhanunjay Seepana, Simha, Spoorthi Jithender	4:59
4.	"Chamkaare Chamka"	Dhanunjay Seepana	4:06
Total length:			17:17

== Home media ==
Jilebi was premiered from 13 June 2024 in Aha Videos.
