= Panchathantram =

2022 Telugu anthology film

- Theatrical release poster
- Directed by: Harsha Pulipaka
- Screenplay by: Harsha Pulipaka
- Story by: Harsha Pulipaka
- Produced by: Akhilesh Vardhan; Srujan Yarabolu
- Starring: Brahmanandam; Swathi Reddy; Shivathmika Rajashekar; Rahul Vijay; Samuthirakani; Naresh Agasthya; Divya Sripada; Srividya; Vikas; Aadarsh Balakrishna
- Cinematography: Raj K. Nalli
- Edited by: Garry BH
- Music by: Prashanth R Vihari; Shravan Bharadwaj
- Production companies: Ticket Factory; S Originals
- Release date: 9 December 2022
- Country: India
- Language: Telugu

Panchathantram is a 2022 Indian Telugu-language anthology film written and directed by Harsha Pulipaka, and produced by Ticket Factory and S Originals. The star cast of the film Brahmanandam, Swathi Reddy, Samuthirakani, Naresh Agatsya, Sri Vidya Maharshi, Rahul Vijay, Shivathmika Rajashekar, Divyavani, DivyaSripada, Vikas, Praanya P Rao, Aadarsh Balakrishna, and Uttej. The soundtrack was composed by Prashanth R Vihari and Shravan Bharadwaj.

== Plot ==
This is a blend of five different stories each dealing with a life event tied to one sense organ. These stories of Sight, Smell, Sound, Taste, and Touch embark on a quest of Peace, Fear, Will, Love, and Tenacity through enchanted dramatic narratives breaking the language barriers. Vedavyas, a 63-year-old gets shortlisted for a storytelling competition alongside five young writers where each one of them has to narrate five stories under a single theme. The winner gets a publishing contract to kick-start their career. Both the crowd and the organizers are surprised to see the old man beside the young finalists. No one takes him seriously. Handling all the ridicule from them, Vyas expresses his theme, ‘The five senses. The five stories that Vyas shares with the audience are what our anthology is about.

Life of Vyas A 63-year-old widower who lives with his daughter after retiring from All India Radio. When Vyas expresses his idea to start a career in writing novels, his daughter disapproves. She instead suggests he stay at home and rest. Vyas resists and the discussion turns into an argument where Vyas states that he isn't done yet!

== Cast ==
Prelude	The Postcard (segment: Sight)	Subha-Lekha(segment: Taste)	The Scent of Red(segment: Smell)	The Kick (segment: Touch)	Leia - the purple-caped superhero (segment: Hearing)
Brahmanandam as Vedavyas; Swathi Reddy as Roshni	Naresh Agatsya as Vihari; Sri Vidya Maharshi as Mythri	Rahul Vijay as Subhash; Shivathmika Rajashekar as Lekha	Samuthirakani as Ramanatham; Divyavani as Ramanatham's wife	Vikas as Shekar; Divya Sripada as Devi	Swathi Reddy as Chitra; Uttej as Sambaiah; Praanya P Rao as Roopa; Aadarsh Balakrishna as Chithra's partner

== Reception ==
Jeevi of Idlebrain.com wrote that "On the whole, Panchathantram is a sensible movie made with honesty. But not good enough to engage in theaters". A critic from The Hindu wrote that "Certain portions of the anthology call for patient viewing while other portions can leave us with a smile".
