= Shivani Rajashekar =

Indian actress (born 1996)

- Born: 1 July 1996 (age 30); Chennai, Tamil Nadu, India
- Occupation: Actress
- Years active: 2021—present
- Parents: Rajasekhar (father); Jeevitha (mother)
- Family: Shivathmika Rajashekar (sister)

Shivani Rajashekar is an Indian actress who appears primarily in Telugu films. She made her debut in Adbhutham (2021). Shivani was supposed to represent Tamil Nadu in the Femina Miss India 2022, but withdrew for medical reasons.

== Early life ==
Shivani was born on 1 July 1996 in Chennai, Tamil Nadu to Rajasekhar and Jeevitha. She was then raised in Hyderabad.

== Filmography ==
- All the films are in Telugu, unless otherwise noted

List of films and roles
Year	Title	Role(s)	Language	Notes	Ref(s)
2021	Pelli SandaD	Maya	Telugu	Debut in a minor role	
2021	Adbhutham	Vennela	Telugu	Debut as lead actress; released on Disney+Hotstar	
2021	WWW	Mithra	Telugu	Released on SonyLIV	
2022	Anbarivu	Yazhini	Tamil	Tamil Debut; released on Disney+Hotstar	
2022	Nenjuku Needhi	Kurinji	Tamil		
2022	Shekar	Shekar's daughter	Telugu	Also co-producer	
2023	Jilebi	G. Lakshmi Bharathi	Telugu		
2023	Kota Bommali PS	P.C Malleti Kumari	Telugu		
2024	Vidya Vasula Aham	Inukollu Vidya	Telugu	Released on Aha	

=== Television ===
List of series and roles
Year	Title	Role(s)	Language	Network	Notes	Ref
2023	Aha Naa Pellanta	Maha	Telugu	ZEE5		
