= 1985 in film =

The following is an overview of events in 1985 in film, including the highest-grossing films, award ceremonies and festivals, a list of films released and notable births and deaths.

== Highest-grossing films (U.S.) ==
The top ten 1985 released films by box office gross in North America are as follows:

Highest-grossing films of 1985
Rank	Title	Distributor	Box-office gross
1	Back to the Future	Universal	$210,609,762
2	Rambo: First Blood Part II	Tri-Star	$150,415,432
3	Rocky IV	MGM	$127,873,716
4	The Color Purple	Warner Bros.	$94,175,854
5	Out of Africa	Universal	$87,071,205
6	Cocoon	20th Century Fox	$76,113,124
7	The Jewel of the Nile	20th Century Fox	$75,973,200
8	Witness	Paramount	$68,706,993
9	The Goonies	Warner Bros.	$61,389,680
10	Spies Like Us	Warner Bros.	$60,088,980

=== Context ===
The year was considered an unsuccessful one for film. Despite a record number of film releases, many films failed at the box office, and ticket sales were down 17% compared with 1984. Industry executives believed the problem, in part, was a lack of original concepts. Films about fantasy and magic failed, as audiences leaned towards science-fiction. Janet Maslin said the fault for this lay partly with Steven Spielberg, who had created such a successful template with films like E.T. the Extra-Terrestrial and Close Encounters of the Third Kind that many fantasy films had imitated them. There was also a saturation of youth-oriented films targeted at those under 18. Executives were not fond of these films, but the financial rewards were too significant to ignore. The few films aimed at older audiences, like Cocoon, were surprise successes. Only Back to the Future and Rambo: First Blood Part II were successful blockbusters, earning more than double the box office of Cocoon. Films offering escapism and pro-America themes like Rambo: First Blood Part II and Rocky IV also fared well.

The glut of youth-targeted films like Return to Oz and The Black Cauldron, and science-fiction comedies like Weird Science, Real Genius, and My Science Project had resulted in a string of failures. Executives said that the films were all very similar and marketed in the same way, offering no variety for audiences.

== Events ==
- April – Rupert Murdoch's News Group Publications officially acquires 50% of TCF Holdings, parent company of 20th Century Fox, for $250 million from Marvin Davis and his family.
- June 5 – The Chicago Cubs play the Atlanta Braves in a baseball game at Wrigley Field. Excerpts from the broadcast later pin this date as the day featured in Ferris Bueller's Day Off.
- December 3 – Roger Moore steps down from the role of James Bond after twelve years and seven films. He is replaced by Timothy Dalton.

== Awards ==
Category/Organization	43rd Golden Globe Awards January 24, 1986		39th BAFTA Awards March 16, 1986	58th Academy Awards March 24, 1986
Category/Organization	Drama	Musical or Comedy	39th BAFTA Awards March 16, 1986	58th Academy Awards March 24, 1986
Best Film	Out of Africa	Prizzi's Honor	The Purple Rose of Cairo	Out of Africa
Best Director	John Huston; Prizzi's Honor		N/A	Sydney Pollack; Out of Africa
Best Actor	Jon Voight; Runaway Train	Jack Nicholson; Prizzi's Honor	William Hurt; Kiss of the Spider Woman	
Best Actress	Whoopi Goldberg; The Color Purple	Kathleen Turner; Prizzi's Honor	Peggy Ashcroft; A Passage to India	Geraldine Page; The Trip to Bountiful
Best Supporting Actor	Klaus Maria Brandauer; Out of Africa		Denholm Elliott; Defence of the Realm	Don Ameche; Cocoon
Best Supporting Actress	Meg Tilly; Agnes of God		Rosanna Arquette; Desperately Seeking Susan	Anjelica Huston; Prizzi's Honor
Best Screenplay, Adapted	Woody Allen; The Purple Rose of Cairo		Richard Condon and Janet Roach; Prizzi's Honor	Kurt Luedtke; Out of Africa
Best Screenplay, Original	Woody Allen; The Purple Rose of Cairo		Woody Allen; The Purple Rose of Cairo	Earl W. Wallace, William Kelley and Pamela Wallace; Witness
Best Original Score	John Barry; Out of Africa		Maurice Jarre; Witness	John Barry; Out of Africa
Best Original Song	"Say You, Say Me"; White Nights		N/A	"Say You, Say Me"; White Nights
Best Foreign Language Film	The Official Story		Colonel Redl	The Official Story

Palme d'Or (Cannes Film Festival):

When Father Was Away on Business (Otac na službenom putu), directed by Emir Kusturica, Yugoslavia

Golden Lion (Venice Film Festival):

Vagabond (Sans toit ni loi), directed by Agnès Varda, France / U.K.

Golden Bear (Berlin Film Festival):

Die Frau und der Fremde (The Woman and the Stranger), directed by Rainer Simon, East Germany
Wetherby, directed by David Hare, United Kingdom

People's Choice Award (Toronto International Film Festival):

The Official Story (La historia oficial), directed by Luis Puenzo, Argentina

== 1985 films ==
=== By country/region ===
- List of American films of 1985
- List of Argentine films of 1985
- List of Australian films of 1985
- List of Bangladeshi films of 1985
- List of British films of 1985
- List of Canadian films of 1985
- List of French films of 1985
- List of Hong Kong films of 1985
- List of Indian films of 1985
  - List of Hindi films of 1985
  - List of Kannada films of 1985
  - List of Malayalam films of 1985
  - List of Marathi films of 1985
  - List of Tamil films of 1985
  - List of Telugu films of 1985
- List of Japanese films of 1985
- List of Mexican films of 1985
- List of Pakistani films of 1985
- List of South Korean films of 1985
- List of Soviet films of 1985
- List of Spanish films of 1985

=== By genre/medium ===
- List of action films of 1985
- List of animated feature films of 1985
- List of avant-garde films of 1985
- List of comedy films of 1985
- List of drama films of 1985
- List of horror films of 1985
- List of science fiction films of 1985
- List of thriller films of 1985
- List of western films of 1985

== Births ==
- January 1 – Juliana Harkavy, American actress
- January 2 – Carla Juri, Swiss actress
- January 3
  - Nicole Beharie, American actress
  - Leah Gibson, Canadian actress
- January 5 – Michael Cuccione, Canadian child actor, singer and dancer (died 2001)
- January 6
  - Hugh Skinner, English actor
  - Adam Pearson (actor), British actor, presenter and campaigner
- January 9 – James Acaster, English comedian and actor
- January 10 – Alex Meraz, American actor and dancer
- January 11 – Aja Naomi King, American actress
- January 12 – Issa Rae, American actress, writer and producer
- January 13 – Ellen Wong, Canadian actress
- January 16 – Sidharth Malhotra, Indian actor
- January 19 – Damien Chazelle, American film director
- January 22 – Tim Dillon, American stand-up comedian and actor
- January 23 – Doutzen Kroes, Dutch actress and model
- January 25
  - Claudia Kim, South Korean actress and model
  - Hartley Sawyer, American actor
  - Michael Trevino, American actor
- January 26 – Edwin Hodge, American actor
- January 28 – Tom Hopper, British actor
- January 29
  - Giovanna Fletcher, English actress and presenter
  - Isabel Lucas, Australian actress and model
- February 2 – Romain Cogitore, French film director
- February 5 – Paige Howard, American actress
- February 6 – Crystal Reed, American actress
- February 7
  - Tina Majorino, American actress
  - Deborah Ann Woll, American actress and model
- February 9
  - David Gallagher, American actor and singer
  - Rachel Melvin, American actress
- February 13 - Tracy Ifeachor, British actress
- February 14 – Jake Lacy, American actor
- February 15 – Natalie Morales, American actress and director
- February 17 – Anne Curtis, Filipino-Australian actress, model, television host
- February 18 - Laia Costa, Spanish actress
- February 19
  - Haylie Duff, American actress and singer
  - Arielle Kebbel, American actress and model
  - Tatanka Means, Native American activist, actor
- February 22 – Zach Roerig, American actor
- February 26 - Shiloh Fernandez, American actor
- February 27 - Heléne Yorke, Canadian actress
- March 1 – Michael Conner Humphreys, American actor
- March 3 – Nathalie Kelley, Australian actress
- March 5 – Kenichi Matsuyama, Japanese actor
- March 9 – Jolyon Coy, English actor and writer
- March 10 – Cooper Andrews, American actor
- March 13 – Emile Hirsch, American actor
- March 14 – Max Benitz, English writer and former actor
- March 15
  - Eva Amurri, American actress
  - Kellan Lutz, American actor
- March 18 – Bianca King, Filipino-British former actress and model
- March 19 – Yolanthe Cabau, Spanish-Dutch actress and television host
- March 21 – Sonequa Martin-Green, American actress and producer
- March 22
  - Katie Stuart, Canadian actress and stunt performer
  - James Wolk, American actor
- March 23 – Maryana Spivak, Russian actress
- March 24 – Jeremy James Kissner, American actor
- March 26
  - Jonathan Groff, American actor and singer
  - Keira Knightley, English actress
  - Francesca Marie Smith, American actress and writer
- March 27 – Ram Charan, Indian film actor
- March 31 – Jessica Szohr, American actress
- April 1 – Josh Zuckerman, American actor
- April 6 - Sinqua Walls, American actor
- April 7 – Ariela Massotti, Brazilian actress
- April 9
  - Annie Funke, American actress
  - Tomohisa Yamashita, Japanese singer, actor and television host
- April 10
  - Barkhad Abdi, Somali-American actor and director
  - Christie Laing, Canadian actress
- April 12 – Hitomi Yoshizawa, Japanese former singer and actress
- April 16
  - Rhiana Griffith, Australian actress
  - Benjamin Rojas, Argentine actor and singer
  - Gregor Schmidinger, Austrian screenwriter and director
- April 17
  - Rooney Mara, American actress
  - Luke Mitchell, Australian actor and model
  - Maiken Pius, Estonian actress
- April 18 - Tom Hughes, English actor
- April 20 – Billy Magnussen, American actor
- April 22 – Kristin Fairlie, Canadian actress
- April 23 – Rachel Skarsten, Canadian actress
- April 27 – Sheila Vand, American actress
- April 29 – Bar Paly, Israeli-American actress
- April 30 – Gal Gadot, Israeli actress and model
- May 3 – Meagan Tandy, American actress and model
- May 5
  - Clark Duke, American actor, comedian and director
  - Shoko Nakagawa, Japanese actress, voice actress and singer
- May 6 – Jamie Winstone, English actress, daughter of actor Ray Winstone
- May 9 – Chris Zylka, American actor and model
- May 10 – Odette Annable, American actress
- May 11
  - Aimee Horne, Australian actress, singer and voice-over artist
  - Jadyn Wong, Canadian actress
- May 14
  - Lina Esco, American actress, producer and director
  - Sally Martin, New Zealand actress
- May 15 – Tathagata Mukherjee, Indian actor
- May 16
  - Stanislav Ianevski, Bulgarian actor
  - Jing Lusi, British actress
  - Andrew Keenan-Bolger, American actor
  - Julia Voth, Canadian actress and model
- May 17 – Sophie McShera, English actress
- May 20 – Joel Fry, British actor and musician
- May 21 - Buddy Duress, American actor (died 2023)
- May 22
  - Tao Okamoto, Japanese actress and model
  - Chris Salvatore, American actor, singer-songwriter, and model
- May 25
  - Luciana Abreu, Portuguese singer, actress and television host
  - Lauren Frost, American actress and singer
  - Roman Reigns, American professional wrestler and actor
- May 28 – Carey Mulligan, English actress
- May 29
  - Blake Foster, American actor
  - Yukihiro Takiguchi, Japanese actor, singer and model (died 2019)
- May 30 – Sam Gifaldi, American actor
- May 31
  - Zoraida Gómez, Mexican actress
- June 2 – Miyuki Sawashiro, Japanese voice actress
- June 4 – Bar Refaeli, Israeli model, television host and actress
- June 5 – Marc Pickering, English actor
- June 7 – Adam Nagaitis, British actor
- June 9 – Sonam Kapoor, Indian actress and model
- June 10
  - Susannah Fielding, English actress
  - Andrew Lees, Australian actor
- June 12
  - Dave Franco, American actor
  - Liisa Pulk, Estonian actress
- June 16 – Débora Nascimento, Brazilian actress and model
- June 17 – Tramell Tillman, American actor
- June 18
  - Sorel Carradine, American actress
  - Alex Hirsch, American voice actor, animator, writer, storyboard artist and producer
- June 21 – Lana Del Rey, American singer and songwriter
- June 22 – Douglas Smith, Canadian actor
- June 24 - Mary Holland, American actress and comedian
- June 25 - Annaleigh Ashford, American actress
- June 27 – Martin Sensmeier, American actor and model
- June 28 – Rae'Ven Larrymore Kelly, American actress
- June 30
  - Lasarus Ratuere, Australian actor
  - Hugh Sheridan, Australian actor, musician and television presenter
- July 1 – Léa Seydoux, French actress
- July 2
  - Nelson Franklin, American actor
  - Ashley Tisdale, American actress and singer
- July 5
  - François Arnaud, Canadian actor
  - Stephanie McIntosh, Australian actress and singer
- July 6 – Ranveer Singh, Indian actor
- July 7 – Seo Woo, South Korean actress
- July 11 – Nitya Vidyasagar, Indian-American actress
- July 14
  - Lee Kwang-soo, South Korean actor, entertainer and model
  - Phoebe Waller-Bridge, English actress and writer
- July 15
  - Tomer Capone, Israeli actor
  - Pedro Carvalho, Portuguese actor
  - Agniya Kuznetsova, Russian actress
  - Crowd Lu, Taiwanese singer-songwriter and actor
  - Ecstasia Sanders, American-Canadian actress
  - Gaia Scodellaro, Italian actress
- July 16
  - Yōko Hikasa, Japanese voice actress and singer
  - Hiroyuki Onoue, Japanese actor
  - Rosa Salazar, Canadian-American actress
  - Cha Ye-ryun, South Korean actress
- July 17 – Caitlin Van Zandt, American actor
- July 18
  - Chace Crawford, American actor
  - James Norton, English actor
- July 20 – John Francis Daley, American actor, director, producer, screenwriter and musician
- July 21 – Vanessa Lengies, Canadian actress and singer
- July 22 – Blake Harrison, English actor, voice actor and dancer
- July 25
  - James Lafferty, American actor, director and producer
  - Shantel VanSanten, American model and actress
- July 27
  - Aljin Abella, Australian actor of Filipino descent
  - Lou Taylor, American actor
- July 28 – Jon Michael Hill, American actor
- July 30 – Aml Ameen, British actor
- August 1 – Henry Lloyd-Hughes, English actor
- August 2 – Georgina Haig, Australian actress
- August 7 - Stephen Oyoung, American actor
- August 9 – Anna Kendrick, American actress and singer
- August 10 – Jared Nathan, American actor (died 2006)
- August 11
  - Jacqueline Fernandez, Sri Lankan actress
  - Henry Lloyd-Hughes, British actor
- August 12 – África Zavala, Mexican actress
- August 15 – Emily Kinney, American actress, singer and songwriter
- August 16
  - Arden Cho, American actress, singer and model
  - Cristin Milioti, American actress and singer
- August 17 – Yū Aoi, Japanese actress
- August 18 – Desiree Casado, former actress
- August 21
  - Laura Haddock, English actress
  - Albrecht Schuch, German actor
- August 23
  - Juss Haasma, Estonian actor
  - Adrian Molina, Mexican-American film director, screenwriter and animator
- August 27 – Kayla Ewell, American actress
- August 31 - Kae Alexander, Japanese actress
- September 2
  - Yani Gellman, Canadian actor
  - Allison Miller, American actress
- September 4 – Morgan Garrett, American voice actress
- September 6 – Lauren Lapkus, American actress and comedian
- September 10
  - Monica Lopera, Colombian-American actress
  - Elyse Levesque, Canadian actress
- September 11 – Hayden Szeto, Canadian actor
- September 16
  - Max Minghella, English actor and filmmaker
  - Madeline Zima, American actress
- September 21 – Robert Hoffman, American actor
- September 22 – Tatiana Maslany, Canadian actress
- September 23 – Hasan Minhaj, American actor and stand-up comedian
- September 24 – Jessica Lucas, Canadian actress and singer
- September 25 – Eréndira Ibarra, Mexican actress
- September 26 – Talulah Riley, English actress
- September 27 – Grace Helbig, American actress, comedian and YouTuber
- September 30 – Ben Lewis, Canadian actor and writer
- October 1 – Emerald Fennell, English screen actress and director
- October 5 – Carolina Bartczak, Canadian-Polish actress
- October 6 – Ida Engvoll, Swedish actress
- October 8 – Max Crumm, American actor and singer
- October 10 – Aaron Himelstein, American actor
- October 11 – Michelle Trachtenberg, American actress (died 2025)
- October 17 – Max Irons, English-Irish actor and model
- October 24 – Tim Pocock, Australian actor
- October 25 – John Robinson, American actor
- October 26
  - Soko, French singer and actress
  - Qi Wei, Chinese actress
  - Asin Thottumkal, Indian actress
- October 28 – Troian Bellisario, American actress
- October 31 – Kether Donohue, American actress and singer
- November 2 – Josh Grelle, American voice actor
- November 5 – Annet Mahendru, American actress
- November 7 – Lucas Neff, American actor
- November 10 – Giovonnie Samuels, American actress
- November 12 – Ben Aldridge, British actor
- November 15 – Thue Ersted Rasmussen, Danish actor
- November 20 – Dan Byrd, American actor
- November 21
  - William Chan, Hong Kong singer and actor
  - Ronny Chieng, Malaysian comedian and actor
- November 23 – Katie Crown, Canadian-American actress, voice actress, comedian and writer
- November 26 – Arturo Castro, Guatemalan actor
- November 27 – Alison Pill, Canadian actress
- November 30
  - Gia Crovatin, American actress and producer
  - Kaley Cuoco, American actress
  - Daniel Ings, English actor
  - Chrissy Teigen, American actress, model and television personality
- December 1 – Janelle Monáe, American singer, rapper and actress
- December 3 – Amanda Seyfried, American actress and singer
- December 5 – Frankie Muniz, American actor
- December 6 – Max Kasch, American actor and musician
- December 10 – Raven-Symoné, American actress and singer
- December 13 – Rachel Hendrix, American actress
- December 25
  - Smith Cho, American actress
  - Perdita Weeks, British actress
- December 27 – Jessica Harmon, Canadian actress and director
- December 31 - Erich Bergen, American actor

== Deaths ==
Month	Date	Name	Age	Country	Profession	Notable films
January	5	Robert Surtees	78	US	Cinematographer	The Graduate; Ben-Hur
January	5	John Paxton	73	US	Screenwriter	Murder, My Sweet; Crossfire
January	11	Edward Buzzell	89	US	Director	Go West; Neptune's Daughter
January	12	Paul Luty	52	UK	Actor	The Water Babies; The Dresser
January	13	Carol Wayne	42	US	Actress	The Party; Heartbreakers
January	14	Jetta Goudal	93	Netherlands	Actress	Lady of the Pavements; Paris at Midnight
January	18	Wilfrid Brambell	72	Ireland	Actor	Steptoe and Son; A Hard Day's Night
January	18	Georgie Stoll	82	US	Composer, Musical Director	Meet Me in St. Louis; Anchors Aweigh
January	25	Paul J. Smith	78	US	Composer	Pinocchio; Cinderella
January	29	Chic Murray	65	UK	Actor	Casino Royale; Gregory's Girl
February	4	John Wexley	77	US	Screenwriter	Angels with Dirty Faces; Confessions of a Nazi Spy
February	6	Neil McCarthy	52	UK	Actor	Where Eagles Dare; Clash of the Titans
February	10	Wanda Tuchock	86	US	Screenwriter	Finishing School; The Foxes of Harrow
February	11	Henry Hathaway	86	US	Director	True Grit; How the West Was Won
February	11	Heinz Roemheld	83	US	Composer	The Lady from Shanghai; Yankee Doodle Dandy
February	12	Nicholas Colasanto	61	US	Actor	Raging Bull; Fat City
February	19	Dorothy Black	85	South Africa	Actress	The Night Has Eyes; The Farmer's Wife
February	20	Clarence Nash	80	US	Voice Actor	The Three Caballeros; Fun and Fancy Free
February	21	Ina Claire	91	US	Actress	The Awful Truth; Ninotchka
February	21	Louis Hayward	75	South Africa	Actor	House by the River; And Then There Were None
February	22	Alexander Scourby	71	US	Actor	The Big Heat; Giant
February	24	Joseph C. Wright	92	US	Art Director	Gentlemen Prefer Blondes; Guys and Dolls
February	27	J. Pat O'Malley	80	UK	Actor	One Hundred and One Dalmatians; Hello, Dolly!
February	27	David Huffman	39	US	Actor	Firefox; F.I.S.T.
March	1	Alfred Zeisler	92	US	Producer, Director	Victor and Victoria; Fear
March	3	Connie Gilchrist	89	US	Actress	A Letter to Three Wives; Some Came Running
March	3	Noel Purcell	84	Ireland	Actor	Moby Dick; Mutiny on the Bounty
March	5	Thomas Little	98	US	Set Decorator	All About Eve; The Day the Earth Stood Still
March	8	Edward Andrews	70	US	Actor	The Harder They Fall; Sixteen Candles
March	19	Anthony Nelson Keys	73	UK	Producer	Dracula; The Curse of Frankenstein
March	21	Michael Redgrave	77	UK	Actor	The Lady Vanishes; The Importance of Being Earnest
March	21	Michael Trubshawe	79	UK	Actor	The Pink Panther; The Guns of Navarone
April	16	Scott Brady	60	US	Actor	Johnny Guitar; The China Syndrome
April	21	John Welsh	70	Ireland	Actor	Krull; Lucky Jim
April	23	Kent Smith	78	US	Actor	Cat People; Nora Prentiss
April	25	Richard Haydn	80	UK	Actor	The Sound of Music; Alice in Wonderland
April	26	Albert Maltz	76	US	Screenwriter	This Gun for Hire; Broken Arrow
May	1	George Pravda	68	Czech Republic	Actor	Thunderball; Firefox
May	4	Harry Earles	83	US	Actor	Freaks; The Unholy Three
May	7	Dawn Addams	54	UK	Actress	The Two Faces of Dr. Jekyll; The Robe
May	8	Susan Morrow	53	US	Actress	The Savage; Cat-Women of the Moon
May	8	Dolph Sweet	64	US	Actor	Finian's Rainbow; Colossus: The Forbin Project
May	9	Edmond O'Brien	69	US	Actor	The Barefoot Contessa; The Man Who Shot Liberty Valance
May	13	Selma Diamond	64	Canada	Actress	My Favorite Year; Bang the Drum Slowly
May	13	Leatrice Joy	91	US	Actress	Vanity; Triumph
May	14	Frank Westmore	62	??	Makeup Artist	The Ten Commandments; The Towering Inferno
May	16	Margaret Hamilton	82	US	Actress	The Wizard of Oz; Brewster McCloud
May	17	Hugh Burden	72	UK	Actor	The Ruling Class; Funeral in Berlin
May	20	George Memmoli	46	US	Actor	Mean Streets; Phantom of the Paradise
May	22	Wolfgang Reitherman	75	Germany	Animator, Director	The Jungle Book; Robin Hood
May	22	Gerald Case	80	UK	Actor	Vampyres; The Elephant Man
May	25	Robert Nathan	91	US	Screenwriter	The Clock; Pagan Love Song
May	26	Harold Hecht	77	US	Producer	Marty; Sweet Smell of Success
May	30	Talbot Jennings	90	US	Screenwriter	Mutiny on the Bounty; Knights of the Round Table
June	1	Richard Greene	66	UK	Actor	Kentucky; The Hound of the Baskervilles
June	7	Gordon Rollings	59	UK	Actor	The Bed Sitting Room; Superman II
June	8	Charles LeMaire	88	US	Costume Designer	All About Eve; Love Is a Many-Splendored Thing
June	9	Clifford Evans	73	UK	Actor	Kiss of the Vampire; The Curse of the Werewolf
June	10	George Chandler	86	US	Actor	Fury; Roxie Hart
June	12	Dominique Laffin	33	France	Actress	The Crying Woman; This Sweet Sickness
June	17	John Boulting	71	UK	Producer, Director	Lucky Jim; I'm All Right Jack
June	17	Georgia Hale	84	US	Actress	The Gold Rush; The Great Gatsby
June	24	Valentine Dyall	77	UK	Actor	Henry V; The Haunting
June	28	James Craig	73	US	Actor	Kitty Foyle; The Human Comedy
July	3	Nelson Leigh	80	US	Actor	Gunfight at the O.K. Corral; World Without End
July	7	Ewen Solon	67	New Zealand	Actor	The Message; Tarzan the Magnificent
July	8	Phil Foster	71	US	Actor	Bang the Drum Slowly; Conquest of Space
July	8	Victor Rendina	68	US	Actor	The Godfather; Racing with the Moon
July	9	Rafael Campos	49	Dominican Republic	Actor	Blackboard Jungle; Where the Buffalo Roam
July	10	Arthur J. Ornitz	68	US	Cinematographer	Serpico; The Boys in the Band
July	16	Elsie Wagstaff	86	UK	Actress	Meet Sexton Blake; The Interrupted Journey
July	17	Margo	68	Mexico	Actress	The Leopard Man; Lost Horizon
July	19	Henry Mollison	80	UK	Actor	The Man in the White Suit; A Bride for Henry
July	20	Estelle Evans	78	Bahamas	Actress	To Kill a Mockingbird; The Learning Tree
July	21	Alvah Bessie	81	US	Screenwriter	Northern Pursuit; Objective, Burma!
July	23	Mickey Shaughnessy	64	US	Actor	From Here to Eternity; Jailhouse Rock
July	23	Tom Waldman	63	US	Screenwriter	The Party; High Time
July	27	Michel Audiard	65	France	Screenwriter, Director	He Died with His Eyes Open; Garde à Vue
July	28	Grant Williams	53	US	Actor	The Incredible Shrinking Man; PT 109
August	1	Al Overton	73	US	Sound Engineer	Diamonds Are Forever; The Shootist
August	1	Joseph Walker	92	US	Cinematographer	It Happened One Night; Mr. Smith Goes to Washington
August	2	Bob Holt	56	US	Actor	Gremlins; Bedknobs and Broomsticks
August	2	Frank Faylen	79	US	Actor	Gunfight at the O.K. Corral; It's a Wonderful Life
August	7	Grayson Hall	62	US	Actress	House of Dark Shadows; The Night of the Iguana
August	8	Louise Brooks	78	US	Actress	Pandora's Box; Diary of a Lost Girl
August	8	Milton H. Greene	63	US	Producer	The Prince and the Showgirl; Bus Stop
August	10	Kenny Baker	72	US	Singer, Actor	The Harvey Girls; At the Circus
August	12	Patrick Hines	55	US	Actor	Amadeus; 1776
August	13	Marion Martin	77	US	Actress	The Big Street; The Man in the Iron Mask
August	14	Gale Sondergaard	86	US	Actress	Anthony Adverse; Anna and the King of Siam
August	15	Lester Cole	81	US	Screenwriter	Blood on the Sun; High Wall
August	24	Morrie Ryskind	89	US	Screenwriter	A Night at the Opera; My Man Godfrey
August	28	Ruth Gordon	88	US	Actress, Screenwriter	Rosemary's Baby; Harold and Maude
August	29	Evelyn Ankers	67	Chile	Actress	The Wolf Man; The Ghost of Frankenstein
August	29	Patrick Barr	77	UK	Actor	The Dam Busters; Octopussy
August	30	Tom Howard	75	UK	Special Effects Artist	Blithe Spirit; Tom Thumb
September	4	Isabel Jeans	93	UK	Actress	Gigi; Suspicion
September	4	George O'Brien	86	US	Actor	Sunrise; She Wore a Yellow Ribbon
September	6	Johnny Desmond	65	US	Actor, Singer	Escape from San Quentin; Calypso Heat Wave
September	6	Jane Frazee	67	US	Actress, Singer	San Antonio Rose; Calendar Girl
September	10	Alexa Kenin	23	US	Actress	Honkytonk Man; Pretty in Pink
September	11	William Alwyn	79	UK	Composer	The Crimson Pirate; A Night to Remember
September	14	Julian Beck	60	US	Actor	The Cotton Club; Oedipus Rex
September	23	Harvey Parry	85	US	Stuntman	Escape from New York; Johnny Dangerously
September	24	Paul Mann	71	Canada	Actor	America, America; Fiddler on the Roof
September	26	Frank Bracht	75	US	Film Editor	The Odd Couple; White Christmas
September	27	Lloyd Nolan	83	US	Actor	Peyton Place; Hannah and Her Sisters
September	28	L. B. Abbott	77	US	Special Effects Artist	Patton; Butch Cassidy and the Sundance Kid
September	29	Arthur Krams	73	US	Set Decorator	The Rose Tattoo; Holiday in Mexico
September	30	Simone Signoret	64	France	Actress	Room at the Top; Ship of Fools
September	30	Floyd Crosby	85	US	Cinematographer	High Noon; The Pit and the Pendulum
October	2	Rock Hudson	59	US	Actor	Giant; Pillow Talk
October	6	Nelson Riddle	64	US	Composer	The Great Gatsby; Lolita
October	8	Theresa Harris	78	US	Actress	Jezebel; Blossoms in the Dust
October	10	Yul Brynner	65	Russia	Actor	The King and I; The Magnificent Seven
October	10	Orson Welles	70	US	Actor, Director, Screenwriter	Citizen Kane; Touch of Evil
October	11	Elwood Ullman	82	US	Screenwriter	Snow White and the Three Stooges; Tickle Me
October	13	Francesca Bertini	93	Italy	Actress	Odette; 1900
October	16	Franklin Milton	78	US	Sound Engineer	Ben-Hur; Grand Prix
October	21	Diane Thomas	39	US	Screenwriter	Romancing the Stone
October	22	Stefano Satta Flores	48	Italy	Actor	We All Loved Each Other So Much; Four Flies on Grey Velvet
October	24	Masaichi Nagata	79	Japan	Producer	Rashomon; Gamera, the Giant Monster
October	28	William Bramley	57	US	Actor	West Side Story; Getting Straight
October	29	John Davis Lodge	82	US	Actor	The Scarlet Empress; The Little Colonel
October	30	Kirby Grant	73	US	Actor	Trail of the Yukon; Northwest Territory
October	30	David Oxley	64	UK	Actor	The Hound of the Baskervilles; House of the Living Dead
November	1	Phil Silvers	74	US	Actor	You're in the Army Now; It's a Mad, Mad, Mad, Mad World
November	6	Sanjeev Kumar	47	India	Actor	Sholay; Aandhi
November	9	Helen Rose	81	US	Costume Designer	The Bad and the Beautiful; Cat on a Hot Tin Roof
November	19	Jimmy Ritz	81	US	Actor	On the Avenue; Pack Up Your Troubles
November	19	Stepin Fetchit	83	US	Actor	Zenobia; Charlie Chan in Egypt
November	27	Harry Harvey Sr.	84	US	Actor	The Pride of the Yankees; Ace in the Hole
December	3	Sam Gilman	70	US	Actor	One-Eyed Jacks; The Missouri Breaks
December	5	Howard Rodman	73	US	Screenwriter	Coogan's Bluff; Charley Varrick
December	8	Jack H. Skirball	89	US	Producer	Shadow of a Doubt; Payment on Demand
December	11	Kathleen Ryan	63	Ireland	Actress	Odd Man Out; Esther Waters
December	12	Anne Baxter	62	US	Actress	The Razor's Edge; All About Eve
December	12	Phil Karlson	77	US	Director	The Silencers; Kid Galahad
December	14	Bruce Weintraub	33	US	Set Decorator	Scarface; Prizzi's Honor
December	17	Harry M. Leonard	85	US	Sound Engineer	Laura; Captain Eddie
December	22	Lawrence Hauben	54	US	Screenwriter	One Flew Over the Cuckoo's Nest
December	23	Gina Kaus	92	Austria	Screenwriter	The Red Danube; The Robe
December	26	Margarete Schön	90	Germany	Actress	Die Nibelungen; The Street Song
December	28	Renato Castellani	72	Italy	Director, Screenwriter	Romeo and Juliet; Under the Sun of Rome
December	31	Ricky Nelson	45	US	Actor, Singer	Rio Bravo; The Wackiest Ship in the Army
December	31	Sam Spiegel	84	Poland	Producer	Lawrence of Arabia; On the Waterfront

== Film debuts ==
- Jane Adams – Bombs Away
- Joan Allen – Compromising Positions
- Kelly Asbury (animator) – The Black Cauldron
- Roger Ashton-Griffiths – Dreamchild
- Sean Astin – The Goonies
- John Aylward – Strings
- Becky Ann Baker – The Protector
- Fairuza Balk – Return to Oz
- Jean-Marc Barr – King David
- Gary Basaraba – Alamo Bay
- Randall Batinkoff – Streetwalkin'
- Josh Brolin – The Goonies
- Tim Burton (director) – Pee Wee's Big Adventure
- Steve Buscemi – The Way It Is
- Helena Bonham Carter – A Room with a View
- Don Cheadle – Moving Violations
- Jude Ciccolella – Insignificance
- Blake Clark – St. Elmo's Fire
- Gary Cole – To Live and Die in L.A.
- Don S. Davis – The Journey of Natty Gann
- Patrick Dempsey – Heaven Help Us
- Kevin Dillon – Heaven Help Us
- Martin Donovan – Hard Choices
- Ellen Albertini Dow – American Drive-In
- Charles S. Dutton – Cat's Eye
- Jeff Fahey – Silverado
- Linda Fiorentino – Vision Quest
- Guillermo Francella – El Telo y la Tele
- Vincent Gallo – The Way It Is
- Peter Gerety – The Little Sister
- Greg Germann – Streetwalkin'
- Gilbert Gottfried – Bad Medicine
- Rupert Graves – A Room with a View
- LisaGay Hamilton – Krush Groove
- Ian Hart – No Surrender
- Ethan Hawke – Explorers
- Amy Hill – Dim Sum: A Little Bit of Heart
- Dana Ivey – Explorers
- Ken Jenkins – What Comes Around
- Richard Jenkins – Silverado
- Elias Koteas – One Magic Christmas
- Aleksei Kravchenko – Come and See
- LL Cool J – Krush Groove
- Stephen Lang – Twice in a Lifetime
- Wallace Langham – Weird Science
- Hugh Laurie – Plenty
- Melissa Leo – Always
- Tom Lister, Jr. – Runaway Train
- Dolph Lundgren – A View to a Kill
- Lesley Manville – Dance with a Stranger
- Stephen Marcus – My Beautiful Laundrette
- Mona Marshall – Starchaser: The Legend of Orin
- Madonna - A Certain Sacrifice
- Matt McCoy – Fraternity Vacation
- Jack McGee – Turk 182
- Viggo Mortensen – Witness
- Brigitte Nielsen – Red Sonja
- Danny Nucci – Explorers
- Hugh O'Conor – Lamb
- Carl Anthony Payne II – The Last Dragon
- Sarah Polley – One Magic Christmas
- Jeremy Ratchford – Junior
- Miranda Richardson – Dance with a Stranger
- Linus Roache – No Surrender
- Chris Rock – Krush Groove
- Gabrielle Rose – The Journey of Natty Gann
- Kyra Sedgwick – War and Love
- Jonathan Silverman – Girls Just Want to Have Fun
- Christian Slater – The Legend of Billie Jean
- Yeardley Smith – Heaven Help Us
- Mira Sorvino – The Stuff
- Fred Thompson – Marie
- Danny Trejo – Runaway Train
- Stanley Tucci – Prizzi's Honor
- Blair Underwood – Krush Groove
- Thomas F. Wilson – Back to the Future
- Russell Wong – The Musical Singer
- Noah Wyle – Lust in the Dust
- Billy Zane – Back to the Future
- Oprah Winfrey – The Color Purple
