= Paadum Vaanampadi =

1985 Tamil dance musical film by M. Jayakumar

- DVD cover
- Directed by: M. Jayakumar
- Story by: Babbar Subhash
- Based on: Disco Dancer
- Produced by: R. Chandrasekhar
- Starring: Anand Babu; Jeevitha
- Cinematography: Ramachandra Babu
- Edited by: T. Karunanidhi
- Music by: Bappi Lahiri; Shankar–Ganesh
- Production company: K. R. Cine Arts
- Release date: 24 February 1985
- Country: India
- Language: Tamil

Paadum Vaanampadi (transl. Singing skylark) is a 1985 Indian Tamil-language dance film directed by M. Jayakumar, starring Anand Babu, and Jeevitha with Nagesh in a guest role. It is a remake of the 1982 Hindi film Disco Dancer. The film was released on 24 February 1985, and ran for more than 100 days at Chennai theatres.

== Plot ==
Anand grows up as the sole provider for his family, which includes his widowed mother and younger sister, Viji. His elder brother, Raja, runs away from home after being falsely accused of theft and imprisoned by their father’s employer, Dharmalingam. Anand later becomes a street performer under the guidance of his mentor, Muthu. During one of his performances, Muthu’s daughter Radha dies, deeply affecting Anand. Following this, Dharmalingam has Anand’s mother arrested on false charges, forcing the family to leave the city in disgrace.

Years later, Dharmalingam’s son Shyam becomes a successful disco dancer but grows arrogant due to his fame. He clashes with his manager Raja and dismisses him. Determined to replace Shyam, Raja discovers Anand dancing on the streets and helps him rise in popularity. Raja subsequently learns that Anand is his younger brother, leading to the family’s reunion. Anand is also reunited with Radha’s twin sister, with whom he falls in love.

As Anand’s success grows, Shyam becomes increasingly resentful and attempts to harm both Anand and Viji. Dharmalingam, whose past wrongdoing is exposed, also seeks revenge. The resulting conflict leads to chaos, which Anand and his family must confront in order to restore their lives.

== Cast ==
- Anand Babu as Anand
- Jeevitha as Radha
- Rajeev as Raja
- Nithya as Viji
- Senthamarai as Dharmalingam
- Nizhalgal Ravi as Shyam
- Manimala as Raja, Anand and Viji's mother
- Janagaraj as Mani aka Mr. Bell
- Vennira Aadai Moorthy as Saguni

Guest appearances

- Nagesh as Muthu
- Delhi Ganesh as Raja, Anand and Viji's father

== Soundtrack ==
Soundtrack was composed by Bappi Lahiri and Shankar–Ganesh. The highlight of the album is the disco song "Naanoru Disco Dancer".

Song	Singers	Lyrics
"En Ninaivuthaane Enguthe"	S. P. Balasubrahmanyam	Vaali
"Naanoru Disco Dancer"	S. P. Balasubrahmanyam	Vaali
"Mayangaathe (Vaazhum Varai)"	S. P. Balasubrahmanyam	Vairamuthu
"Adi Kanne Ilam Penne"	S. P. Balasubrahmanyam	Na. Kamarasan
"Aatathil Naanthaan Raja Raja"	Malaysia Vasudevan, Vani Jairam	Na. Kamarasan
"Vaazhum Varai"	SPB, Latha Kannan	Vairamuthu
"Anbe Anbe Anbe"	P. Susheela	Muthulingam

== Reception ==
Kalki criticised the film for having too many stunt sequences, but said the scene where a monkey trains Anand Babu in stunts was first class.
