= Dharmapatni (1987 film) =

- Title card
- Directed by: Tatineni Prasad
- Written by: Ganesh Patro (dialogues)
- Screenplay by: Tatineni Prasad
- Story by: Anjaneya Pushpanand
- Based on: Dharma Pathini (1986)
- Produced by: CKR Prasad; CRR Prasad
- Starring: Suman; Bhanupriya; Rajendra Prasad
- Cinematography: Navakanth
- Edited by: Kotagiri Venkateswara Rao
- Music by: Chakravarthy
- Production company: Satya Shakti Pictures
- Release date: 1 May 1987
- Running time: 122 mins
- Country: India
- Language: Telugu

Dharmapatni (transl. Righteous Wife) is a 1987 Indian Telugu-language action film, directed by Tatineni Prasad. The film stars Suman, Bhanupriya and Rajendra Prasad, with music composed by Chakravarthy. It is a remake of the Tamil film Dharma Pathini (1986).

== Cast ==
- Suman as Inspector Prasanna
- Bhanupriya as S.I. Vidya
- Rajendra Prasad as Bosu Babu
- Nutan Prasad as Narasimha Murthy
- Allu Ramalingaiah as Linga Murthy
- Mikkilineni
- Tatineni Prasad as D. J.
- Suthi Velu as Lawyer Madhusudhana Rao
- Raavi Kondala Rao as Lawyer Dakshina Rao
- Narra Venkateswara Rao as Samba Murthy
- Jagga Rao
- Rajyalakshmi as Prameela
- Anuradha as item number

== Soundtrack ==
Music composed by Chakravarthy. Lyrics were written by Veturi. Music released on AVM Audio Company.

S. No.	Song title	Singers	length
1	"O Chinuku"	S. P. Balasubrahmanyam, S. Janaki	3:49
2	"Vayyarale Vollanthata"	S. P. Balasubrahmanyam, S. Janaki	3:34
3	"Talachuko Talachuko"	S. P. Balasubrahmanyam	4:19
4	"Kothaga Ninnu"	S. Janaki	3:44
