= Selvi (1985 film) =

- Theatrical release poster
- Directed by: K. Natraj
- Screenplay by: R. Thyagarajan
- Dialogue by: Vietnam Veedu Sundaram
- Produced by: C. Dhandayudhapani
- Starring: Suresh; Revathi
- Cinematography: Babu
- Edited by: M. G. Balu Rao
- Music by: Ilaiyaraaja
- Production company: Dhandayudhapani Films
- Release date: 1 March 1985
- Country: India
- Language: Tamil

Selvi is a 1985 Indian Tamil-language film directed by K. Natraj and produced by Dhandayudhapani Films. The film stars Suresh and Revathi. It was released on 1 March 1985.

== Cast ==
- Suresh
- Revathi
- Radha Ravi
- Jeevitha
- R. Dilip
- Senthil
- Vadivukkarasi
- Gandhimathi
- Kovai Sarala
- Rajeev

== Soundtrack ==
The music was composed by Ilaiyaraaja.

All lyrics are written by Vaali.

Track listing
No.	Title	Singer(s)	Length
1.	"Ilamanadhu"	S. P. Balasubrahmanyam, S. Janaki	4:31
2.	"Onne Onnu"	S. P. Balasubrahmanyam, S. Janaki	4:17
3.	"Yaar Yaaro"	Malaysia Vasudevan, S. Janaki	4:25
4.	"Kuyile Kuyile"	S. Janaki	4:20
5.	"Ilamanadhu" (instrumental)	—	4:30
6.	"Poda Poda"	Malaysia Vasudevan, S. Janaki	4:22
Total length:			26:25

== Critical reception ==
Jayamanmadhan of Kalki praised the scenes involving dogs and Vietnam Veedu Sundaram's dialogues. Balumani of Anna praised the acting, music, dialogues, cinematography and direction.
