= Jeevitha =

Indian actress

Jeevitha Rajasekhar
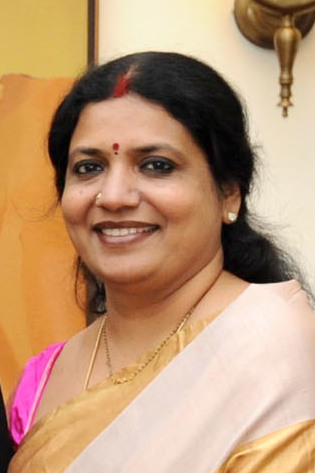
- Jeevitha in 2015
- Born: 24 May 1966 (age 60)
- Occupations: Actress; director; producer
- Years active: 1984–1990, 2024–present (actress); 2002–present (producer and director)
- Spouse: Rajasekhar (m. 1991)
- Children: Shivani (b. 1996); Shivathmika (b. 2000)

Jeevitha, popularly known as Jeevitha Rajasekhar is an Indian actress, director and producer who has primarily worked in Tamil and Telugu films.

== Career ==
Jeevitha made her debut in Tamil with T. Rajendar's Uravai Kaatha Kili in 1984 and within a short span acted with the top heroes of the time such as Sivakumar, Vijayakanth, Karthik, Suresh and Sathyaraj. The actress who started her career in 1984, acted in almost forty movies in six years and left the movie industry in 1991 after marrying actor Rajasekhar who primarily works in Telugu movies. Jeevitha's last film in Tamil was Valaikappu (1988). She was last seen on screen as an actress in the 1990 Telugu film Magaadu, which starred her husband Rajasekhar.

Jeevitha turned director with the film Seshu. She later directed a handful of films as well, including Evadaithe Nakenti (2007), Satyameva Jayate (2009), Mahankali (2013) and Shekar (2022).

She returned to acting after thirty-three years in Lal Salaam.

== Filmography ==
=== As actress ===
Year	Title	Role	Language	Notes
1984	Uravai Kaatha Kili	Kuzhandhai	Tamil	
1985	Paadum Vaanampadi	Radha	Tamil	
1985	Selvi	Usha	Tamil	
1985	Ilamai	Bhaama	Tamil	
1985	Idhu Engal Rajyam	Chinna Ponnu	Tamil	
1985	Sugamana Raagangal	Jeeva	Tamil	
1985	Naane Raja Naane Mandhiri	Savithri	Tamil	
1985	Viswanathan Velai Venum	Sujatha	Tamil	
1985	Vetrikani	Priya	Tamil	
1985	Engal Kural	Shanthi	Tamil	
1985	Hello Yaar Pesurathu		Tamil	
1985	Pattuchelai	Sarasu	Tamil	
1986	Maruthi	Valli	Tamil	
1986	Kanna Thorakkanum Saami	Sumathi	Tamil	
1986	Jothi Malar	Rani	Tamil	
1986	Enakku Nane Needipathi	Devika	Tamil	
1986	Piranthaen Valarnthaen	Meera	Tamil	
1986	Talambralu		Telugu	
1986	Jigujigu Rail		Telugu	
1986	Choru	Shenbagam	Tamil	
1986	Africavil Appu		Tamil	
1986	Mounam Kalaikirathu	Deepa	Tamil	
1986	Aayiram Kannudayaal	Uma	Tamil	
1986	Dharma Pathini	Vidhya	Tamil	
1987	Raja Mariyadhai	Vaidehi	Tamil	
1987	Ini Oru Sudhanthiram	Thayamma	Tamil	
1987	Kadamai Kanniyam Kattupaadu		Tamil	
1987	Prema Kadambari	Sudha	Kannada	
1987	Damit Katha Adam Thirigindi	Rani	Telugu	
1987	Prajaswamyam	Bharati	Telugu	
1987	Aahuthi	Santhi	Telugu	
1988	Station Master	Pushpa	Telugu	
1988	Bava Marudula Sawal		Telugu	
1988	Tiragabadda Telugubidda	Jhansi	Telugu	
1988	Valaikappu	Chithra	Tamil	
1988	Siripuram Chinnodu		Telugu	
1988	Mr. Hero		Telugu	
1988	Janaki Ramudu	Abaddala Satyavathi	Telugu	
1988	Nava Bharatham		Telugu	
1988	Kankana Bhagya		Kannada	
1989	Manchi Varu Maavaru		Telugu	
1989	Chennapatnam Chinnollu	Radha	Telugu	
1989	Anna Chellalu	Jyothi	Telugu	
1989	Ankusam	Parvati	Telugu	
1990	Magaadu	Vikram's wife	Telugu	
2024	Lal Salaam	Rani	Tamil	

=== As director and producer ===
Year	Film	Credited as			Notes
Year	Film	Director	Producer	Screenplay	Notes
2002	Seshu	Yes	No	Dialogues	Remake of Tamil film Sethu
2004	Aaptudu	No	Yes	No	Remake of Hindi film Ghatak: Lethal
2007	Evadaithe Nakenti	Co-director	Yes	No	Remake of Malayalam film Lion
2009	Satyameva Jayate	Yes	No	No	Remake of Hindi film Khakee
2013	Mahankali	Yes	Yes	No	Remake of Hindi film Risk
2015	Gaddam Gang	No	Presenter	No	Remake of Tamil film Soodhu Kavvum
2021	Deyyam	No	Co-producer	No	
2022	Shekar	Yes	Yes	Yes	Remake of Malayalam film Joseph
