= Viswanathan Velai Venum =

- Poster
- Directed by: Raghuram
- Written by: Abaswaram Ramji
- Produced by: B. S. Lokanath; Abaswaram Ramji
- Starring: Karthik; Anand Babu; Jeevitha; Anitha Reddy
- Cinematography: B. S. Lokanath
- Edited by: M. Vellaisamy, R. Krishnamoorthy
- Music by: Shankar–Ganesh
- Production company: Janani
- Release date: 27 July 1985
- Country: India
- Language: Tamil

Viswanathan Velai Venum (transl. Viswanathan, I want work) is a 1985 Indian Tamil language film directed by Raghuram in his debut. The film stars Karthik and Anand Babu in lead roles. It was released on 27 July 1985. The film's title is based on a line from the song "Maadimele" from Kadhalikka Neramillai (1964).

== Cast ==
- Karthik as Ashok
- Anand Babu as Kumar
- Jeevitha as Sujatha
- Anitha Reddy as Janani
- Thengai Srinivasan as Vishwanathan
- Y. G. Mahendran
- Nalinikanth
- Kallapetti Singaram

== Soundtrack ==
The soundtrack was composed by Shankar–Ganesh.

Track listing
No.	Title	Lyrics	Singer(s)	Length
1.	"Janani"	Vaali	P. Jayachandran, S. P. Sailaja
2.	"Kungumame"	Vaali	S. P. Balasubrahmanyam
3.	"Neram Kaalam"	Vaali	Malaysia Vasudevan
4.	"Naan Oru"	Raghuram	S. P. Balasubrahmanyam
5.	"Kadhal Swayamvaram"	Vaali	S. P. Sailaja
