= Vijayalakshmi Navaneethakrishnan =

Indian Tamil folk musician

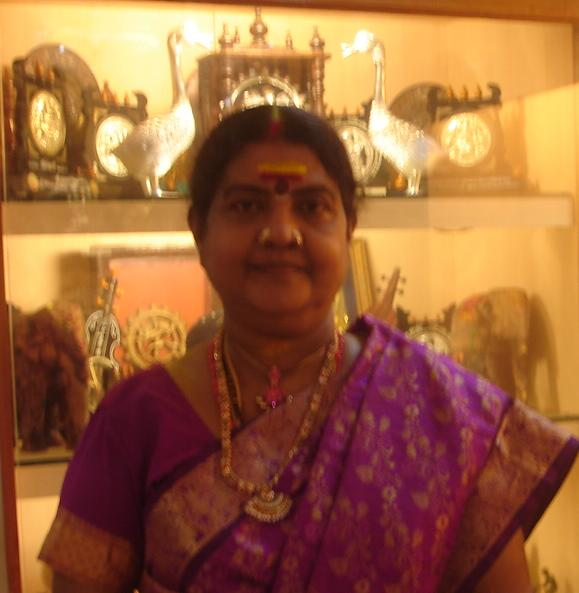
- Dr. Vijayalakshmi Navaneethakrishnan
- Born: 27 January 1946 (age 80)
- Occupations: Musician, Composer, Author and Professor
- Writing career
- Genre: Tamil Folk Art

Vijayalakshmi Navaneethakrishnan is a Tamil folk singer and composer and a renowned exponent of Tamil folk art. Together with her husband M. Navaneethakrishnan, she has conducted several years of research and study on Tamil folk music and dances and devoted a lifetime to research, collection, revival, and documentation of ancient Tamil folk songs and dances, many of which are fast becoming obsolete. The Government of India has announced Padma Shri, the nation's fourth highest civilian award, for the year 2018 to the singer for her extraordinary contribution in her field.

Vijayalakshmi was born is Chinnasuraigayamapatti near Rajapalayam. Her Father is Ponnuswamy and Mother is Mookammal. She has a Ph.D. degree in M.A. She worked as a professor at the Centre for Folk Arts in the Department of Art History and Aesthetic Fine Arts, Madurai Kamaraj University. Her husband Dr Navneetha Krishnan is also a professor in the same field.

After retiring as professors in the Department of Folk Arts and Culture from the Madurai Kamaraj University, the couple continue their studies on folk art and culture. Along with their troupe, they conduct performances that are sought after by connoisseurs and lovers of Tamil folk music around the world. The couple have brought out several albums of authentic Tamil folk music. Having recorded more than 10,000 audio cassettes of authentic folk music, the couple are now working towards classifying this extensive collection to generate a Tamil folk music grammar and guide. They also plan to compile an encyclopaedia of Tamil folk art.

Dr. Vijayalakshmi Navaneethakrishnan has published twenty three articles on folk art. She has given thirty talks over the radio on folk art and music. Dr. Vijayalakshmi Navaneethakrishnan and Dr. Navaneethakrishnan have co-authored eleven books on different subjects related to the field. She won several awards for folk songs

Dr. Vijayalakshmi Navaneethakrishnan has been awarded with the Padma Shri in 2018.
