= Anand Babu =

Indian actor

- Born: 30 August 1963 (age 63); Chennai, Tamil Nadu, India
- Occupation: Actor
- Spouse: Shanthi (m. 1985)
- Children: 4
- Father: Nagesh

Anand Babu is an Indian actor who is known for his works in Tamil films. He is the son of comedy actor Nagesh.

== Career ==
He first entered the film industry with Tamil films and also played leading roles in Telugu as well as supporting roles. He is also well known for his best dancing abilities. Anand's acting debut was in the Tamil film Thangaikkor Geetham in 1983 directed by T. Rajendar.

He appeared in many films in the early 1990s. Despite his solid beginning in film industry, he has faced a steady decline. He has also acted in some Tamil TV serials.

After long back, he appeared in Aadhavan (2009) directed by K. S. Ravikumar.

Anand Babu appears on the big screen after a long time in Pyaar Prema Kaadhal (2018).

== Personal life ==
He attended School at Campion Anglo Indian School Trichy and graduated at Loyola college of arts and science Chennai. Anand married Shanthi on 8 December 1985. The couple has three sons and a daughter. Their second son Gajesh is an actor in the Tamil film industry. Their eldest son, Bijesh is an actor.

== Filmography ==
=== Tamil films ===
Year	Film	Role	Notes
1983	Thangaikkor Geetham	Babu	
1984	Nyayam Ketkiren	Anand	
1984	Kadamai	Anu	
1984	Puyal Kadantha Bhoomi	Babu	
1985	Bandham	Raja	
1985	Paadum Vaanampadi	Babu	
1985	Udhaya Geetham	Anand	
1985	Ilamai	Anand	
1985	Viswanathan Velai Venum	Kumar	
1985	Vetrikani	Raja	
1985	Paartha Gnabagam Illayo	Rathnam	
1985	Arthamulla Aasaigal	Anand Babu	
1986	Maaveeran	Dancer	
1986	Mounam Kalaikirathu	Rajesh	
1988	Veedu Manaivi Makkal	Anand	
1988	Kadarkarai Thaagam	Kishore	
1989	Thaaya Thaarama	Ramesh	
1990	Pengal Veettin Kangal	Prakash	
1990	Pudhu Vasantham	Michael	
1990	Seetha Geetha	Raja	
1990	Puriyaadha Pudhir	Babu	
1990	Pudhu Pudhu Ragangal	Babu	
1990	Ethir Kaatru	Jana (Janardan)	
1990	Engal Swamy Ayyappan	Swamy	Guest appearance
1991	Sigaram	Krishna	
1991	Cheran Pandiyan	Chandran	
1991	MGR Nagaril	Mahadevan	
1991	Putham Pudhu Payanam	Babu	
1991	Idhaya Oonjal	Babu	
1991	Anbu Sangili	Vinoth	
1991	Onnum Theriyatha Pappa	Ramesh	
1991	Eashwari	Muthu	
1991	En Aasai Rasathi	Muthan	
1991	Thayamma	Anand	
1992	Rendu Pondatti Kaavalkaaran	Krishnan, Anand	
1992	Vaaname Ellai	Deepak	
1992	Kaavalukku Kannillai	Babu	
1993	En Idhaya Rani	Raja	
1993	Suriyan Chandiran	Mani	
1993	Naan Pesa Ninaipathellam	Viswanath	
1994	Watchman Vadivelu	Raja Manickam	
1994	Pattukottai Periyappa	Pichumani	
1994	Manirathnam	Mani	
1996	Veettukulle Thiruvizha	Muthuvel	
1997	Roja Malare	Anbu	
1998	Kondattam	Siva	
1998	Santhosham	Karthik	
1998	Cheran Chozhan Pandian	Chozhan	
1999	Anbulla Kadhalukku	Priya's brother	
2009	Oliyum Oliyum	Ramu's elder brother	
2009	Madurai Sambavam	Henchman	
2009	Aadhavan	Tharani	
2012	Etho Seithai Ennai	Veeru	
2014	Jamaai	Guru	
2018	Pyaar Prema Kaadhal	Sindhuja's father	
2023	Kodai	Pavithra's father	
2023	Pallu Padama Paathukka	Rohit Sharma	
2025	S/O Kaalingarayan		
2025	Kutram Thavir		
2025	Madharas Mafia Company		

=== Telugu films ===
Year	Film	Role	Notes
1986	Bhale Mitrulu	Anand	
1988	Illu Illalu Pillalu	Anand	
1989	Paila Pacheesu	Ashok	
1991	Srisaila Bhramarambika Kataksham	Raja	
1993	Maa Variki Pelli		
1993	Inspector Ashwini	Babu	
1994	Kishkindha Kanda	Dora	
1999	Speed Dancer		

=== Other language films ===
Year	Film	Role	Language	Notes
1991	Avalariyathe	Anand	Malayalam	
1992	Chevalier Michael	Freddy	Malayalam	
2021	Atrangi Re	Vishu's father	Hindi	Dubbed in Tamil as Galatta Kalyanam

== Television ==
Year	Show	Role	Language	Channel
1997–2001	Andam	Kalyan	Telugu	ETV
2000–2002	Soolam	Babu	Tamil	Sun TV
2000–2001	Take it easy Vazhkai	Vijayaraghavan or Anand Babu	Tamil	Sun TV
2001–2004	Bumperkuzhgal	Tamil Arasan	Tamil	Jaya TV
2002	Kula Vilakku		Tamil	Sun TV
2004–2006	Manaivi	Varadha Raj	Tamil	Sun TV
2006–2007	Kasthuri	Krishnan	Tamil	Sun TV
2017–2020	Mouna Ragam	Viswanathan	Tamil	Star Vijay
2021–2024	Muthazhagu	Veeramuthu	Tamil	Star Vijay
2022–2023	Mouna Raagam 2	Viswanathan	Tamil	Star Vijay
2023–2024	Kizhakku Vaasal	Dayalan	Tamil	Star Vijay
2025–2026	Poongatru Thirumbuma	Kasinathan	Tamil	Star Vijay
2026–Present	Siragugal	Sakthivel	Tamil	Sun TV
