= Dharma Pathini (1986 film) =

- Title card
- Directed by: Ameerjan
- Written by: Kanmani Subbu (dialogues)
- Story by: A. Anjaneya Pushpanand
- Produced by: Durga Tamilmani; Kamatchi Tamilmani; Yasodha Tamilmani; S. R. M. Chokkalingam
- Starring: Karthik; Jeevitha
- Cinematography: C. S. Ravibabu
- Edited by: S. S. Nazir
- Music by: Ilaiyaraaja
- Production company: Sri Shanmugalaya Arts
- Release date: 14 March 1986
- Country: India
- Language: Tamil

Dharma Pathini (transl. Faithful Wife) is a 1986 Indian Tamil-language film directed by Ameerjan, starring Karthik and Jeevitha. It was released on 14 March 1986. The film was remade in Telugu as Dharmapatni and in Hindi as Jawab Hum Denge, both films releasing in 1987.

== Plot ==
Prem Kumar, an honest police inspector, is transferred to Neelankarai Police Station and immediately clashes with the notorious thug D. Janardhanan "DJ", whom he single-handedly beats and imprisons. Prem Kumar meets Vidhya, a feisty woman who takes down some misbehaving men on the road. Vidhya joins the police station as a Sub-inspector, and after an intimate encounter, as they work together on a security detail for Ilaiyaraaja's musical concert, Prem Kumar and Vidhya develop feelings for each other. Prabhakaran "Prabhakar", an honest trade union leader, is preparing to lead a strike against the mill owners, who are denying a wage hike and bonus. However, the owners bribe the union's secretary, Mohan, to sabotage the strike.

Prabhakaran has a past with Vidhya's sister, Krishna, whom he loved, but Krishna's father, Kamalanathan, a retired I. G, disapproved of their relationship due to Prabhakaran's low income. Kamalanathan asked Prabhakaran to leave Krishna for her good so that she could pursue a prosperous life as a scientist in the USA. Prabhakaran selflessly let go of Krishna, who later suffered an accident in her chemistry lab that left her blind. Moved by Prabhakaran's unwavering love and dedication, Kamalanathan finally accepts their union. Prem Kumar and Vidhya, as well as Prabhakaran and Krishna, get married in a joint ceremony. Meanwhile, DJ escapes from prison, and Prem Kumar rushes to his hideout to apprehend him, but DJ manages to escape.

Mohan collects round ₹100,000 (equivalent to ₹1.4 million or US$14,000 in 2023) from laborers under pretenses, claiming it's for Prabhakar's marriage. Upon learning the truth, he heads to Mohan's hideout at Swapna Lodge, but as he is not there, Prabhakar waits for a bus to go to Mohan's residence. Unbeknownst to Prabhakar, Vidhya arrives at the lodge to raid a brothel. Two men, hired by the Siva Mill owners, detain Prabhakar at the bus stop under false pretenses, allowing Mohan to be killed before Prabhakar can confront him. Vidhya spots Prabhakar and offers him a ride to Mohan's house. At Mohan's residence, Prabhakar finds Mohan and his family brutally murdered. Simultaneously, Prem Kumar receives an anonymous call accusing Prabhakar of the crime. When Prem Kumar arrives, he sees Prabhakar removing the stabbed knife from Mohan's corpse, which incriminates him. It is revealed that the Siva Mill owners hired DJ to kill Mohan and frame Prabhakar for the crime.

Vidhya questions Prem Kumar's conclusion that Prabhakar is the murderer, pointing out that Prem Kumar only saw Prabhakar removing the knife from Mohan's corpse. Prem Kumar cites the fingerprints found at the scene, Prabhakar's motive to kill Mohan due to their conflicts, and the anonymous phone call as evidence. However, Vidhya provides an alibi for Prabhakar, stating that she picked him up at the bus stop at 9:40 pm and dropped him off at Mohan's residence at 9:55 pm, which contradicts the post-mortem report's timeline of the murder occurring between 8 pm and 10 pm. Prem Kumar remains unconvinced, mentioning that the two men who claimed to be employees of a mill in Bangalore are fake, as no such mill exists. Despite Vidhya's protests, Prem Kumar believes the evidence points to Prabhakar's guilt. The court sentences Prabhakar to death. Vidhya vows to uncover the truth and clear Prabhakar's name.

Meanwhile, she and Krishna perform rituals in temples, seeking divine intervention. Vidhya seeks the help of senior lawyer "Vicks" Vardarajan to secure Prabhakar's release, which infuriates Prem Kumar, as he fears his investigation will be discredited. Prem Kumar lashes out at Vidhya, prioritizing Prabhakar's freedom over their relationship. Vidhya decides to compromise her integrity by lying in court, using fabricated witnesses to claim Prabhakar was with her in a hotel room at the time of the murder. Despite being shocked by Vidhya's decision, "Vicks" Vardarajan skillfully word-plays against his brother, public prosecutor Dhakshinamoorthy, and "believably" lies that Vidhya was with Prabhakar at the Swapna Lodge, leading to Prabhakar's acquittal. However, Vidhya's fabricated alibi comes at a great personal cost. Her sister, father, and Prem Kumar accuse her of infidelity, and Prem Kumar ironically sends her to the same Swapna Lodge she had lied about being with Prabhakar.

After Prem Kumar's road accident, Vidhya rushes him to the hospital, where he recovers but remains angry with her. During his discharge, the hospital nurse reveals a crucial truth: she had seen Vidhya picking up Prabhakar on her bike on the night of the murder, contradicting Vidhya's fabricated alibi. The nurse had kept silent due to a traumatic experience of being raped by goons on the same day. Upon learning the truth, Prem Kumar's anger turns to regret, and he sets out to find Vidhya. However, DJ abducts her and also beats Prabhakar to hold him captive. "Pothuppani" Ponnuchamy had been masquerading as an influential social worker, but his facade was eventually exposed. He and his assistant, Mammutti, were reduced to working as gardeners, where Prabhakar was held captive.

Ponnuchamy and Mammutti help Prabhakar escape by retrieving the key, and they capture the two men who had detained Prabhakar at the bus stop, revealing that the mill owner had paid them to do so. Prem Kumar gets busy rescuing Vidhya from DJ, who demands the release of the two men in exchange for Vidhya's safety. A shootout ensues between the police and DJ's goons during the exchange. Vidhya manages to escape by pushing DJ into the fire, and she finally reunites with Prem Kumar.

== Cast ==
- Karthik as Inspector Prem Kumar
- Jeevitha as Sub-inspector Vidhya
- Chandrasekhar as Prabhakaran "Prabhakar"
- Goundamani "Pothuppani" Ponnuchamy
- Senthil as Mammutti, Ponnuchamy's sidekick
- Gomathi as Krishna, Vidhya's elder sister
- Radha Ravi as D. Janardhanan "DJ"
- Poornam Viswanathan as Kamalanathan, Retd. I. G.
- Charle as MLA Palayam
- Sivaraman as Constable Kothandam
- T. S. Raghavendar as Siva Mill owner
- Moahana Priya as a nurse
- LIC Narasimhan as a collector (Special Appearance)
- Babitha as a dancer in the song "Mottuthan Ithu Ithu"
- V. R. Thilagam as a judge (Special Appearance)
- Srilekha as Ponnuchamy's wife
- Visu as Lawyer "Vicks" Vardarajan (Special Appearance)
- Kishmu as Dakshinamoorthy, Public Prosecutor (Special Appearance)
- Ilaiyaraaja in a special appearance for the song "Naan Thedum Sevanthi Poovithu"
- Karuppu Subbiah as a constable (uncredited)

== Production ==
The song "Naan Thedum Sevvanthi" was shot at Prasad Studios. The poster which featured Karthik and Jeevitha in police outfit embracing each other generated controversy which led to discussions in legislative assembly. The song "Mothuthan Idhu" was shot at Majestic Studios.

== Soundtrack ==
The music was composed by Ilaiyaraaja.

Song	Singers	Lyrics
"Naan Thedum Sevanthi"	Ilaiyaraaja, S. Janaki	Kanmani Subbu
"Kathirunthen Kanava"	S. Janaki	Vairamuthu
"Mutham Kattil Mutham"	K. J. Yesudas, K. S. Chithra	Chidambaranathan
"Sumangali Poojai"	P. Susheela, S. P. Sailaja	Vaali
"Mottuthan Ithu Ithu"	S. Janaki	Na. Kamarasan
