= Ilamai =

- Title card
- Directed by: Rama Narayanan
- Written by: K. Dinakar (dialogues)
- Produced by: T. R. Seenivasan
- Starring: Arjun; Anand Babu; Jeevitha; Anitha Reddy
- Cinematography: N. K. Viswanathan
- Edited by: Gowthaman
- Music by: Gangai Amaran
- Production company: Charuchithra Films
- Release date: 29 April 1985
- Country: India
- Language: Tamil

Ilamai (transl. Adolescence) is a 1985 Indian Tamil-language film, directed by Rama Narayanan. The film stars Arjun, Anand Babu, Jeevitha and Anitha Reddy. It was released on 29 April 1985.

== Cast ==
- Arjun as Arjun
- Anand Babu as Anand
- Jeevitha as Bhaama
- Anitha Reddy as Bhooma
- V. K. Ramasamy
- Srikanth
- S. S. Chandran
- Manorama
- Vadivukkarasi
- Idichapuli Selvaraj
- Gundu Kalyanam

== Soundtrack ==
The music was composed by Gangai Amaran.

Track listing
No.	Title	Lyrics	Singer(s)	Length
1.	"Roja Dhegame"	Muthulingam	S. P. Balasubrahmanyam, S. Janaki
2.	"Paarthal Nalla"	Gangai Amaran	P. Jayachandran, S. N. Surendar
3.	"Minnala Thenrala"	Vaali	S. P. Balasubrahmanyam, Malaysia Vasudevan
4.	"Mama Mama"	Vaali	S. P. Balasubrahmanyam, Malaysia Vasudevan
