= Arthamulla Aasaigal =

1985 film

- Title card
- Directed by: Babu Maharaja
- Written by: Babu Maharaja
- Produced by: B.Mohammad Kassim; A.Thajudeen
- Starring: Karthik; Ambika; Anand Babu; Sadhana
- Cinematography: A. V. Ramakrishnan
- Edited by: K. R. Ramalingam
- Music by: Gangai Amaran
- Production company: Peninsula Productions
- Release date: 27 September 1985
- Country: India
- Language: Tamil

Arthamulla Aasaigal (transl. Meaningful desires) is a 1985 Indian Tamil-language crime drama film written and directed by Babu Maharaja. The film stars Karthik, Ambika, Anand Babu and Sadhana. It was released on 27 September 1985.

== Plot ==
Selvam is a poor fisherman in the town of Mullaipattinam. He struggles to feed his family and is determined to become rich by any means. He clashes with Radha, the daughter of Krishnan, the richest man in town. With no job and little prospects left in town, Selvam leaves for Madras and quickly finds a place with a group of smugglers. Prabhu, the leader of the group, acquires foreign goods and opium from Shanthakumar and sells them on the black market. Selvam makes money in his new job but also attracts the attention of Customs Inspector Ganesh. In a twist of fate, he befriends Ganesh's younger brother Anand Babu. Selvam also meets Radha again, and they soon fall in love. Shanthakumar and Prabhu end their partnership as the former is distrustful of Prabhu's girlfriend Ganga.

Krishnan learns of Radha and Selvam's love affair and opposes it as he's promised Radha's hand in marriage to Prabhu. Selvam loses his position with Prabhu's organisation and begins to work with Shantakumar. He soon becomes very rich and powerful. Selvam builds a mansion for his mother and sister Jaya. Anand and Jaya meet at a dance class and fall for each other. Selvam is supportive of their love, but Ganesh is hesitant to allow his brother to marry a smuggler's sister. He will allow the wedding to take place only after Selvam surrenders for his crimes. Prabhu is determined to destroy Selvam and marry Radha. Selvam finds himself cornered by law enforcement as he struggles to arrange Jaya's marriage to Anand and rescue Radha from Prabhu.

== Cast ==
- Karthik as Selvam
- Ambika as Radha
- Anand Babu as Anand Babu
- Sadhana as Jaya
- Jaishankar as Customs Inspector Ganesh
- Sathyaraj as Prabhu
- Thengai Srinivasan as Krishnan
- Nalinikanth as Shanthakumar
- Senthil
- Anuradha as Ganga
- Loose Mohan
- Pandari Bai as Selvam and Jaya's mother
- Ennatha Kannaiya as Kannaiya
- Kullamani as Naidu

== Production ==
Some of the scenes were shot at Muttom, Kanyakumari.

== Soundtrack ==
The music was composed by Gangai Amaran.

Track listing
No.	Title	Lyrics	Singer(s)	Length
1.	"Indha Vaanam"	Vaali	S. P. Balasubrahmanyam, S. P. Sailaja	4:56
2.	"Katcha Theevil"	Pulamaipithan	Vani Jairam	3:39
3.	"Yamma Yamma Summa"	Muthulingam	Malaysia Vasudevan, S. Janaki	4:12
4.	"Tharaimel"	Vaali	Deepan Chakravarthy, S. Janaki	4:21
Total length:				17:08

== Reception ==
Balumani of Anna praised the film for being entertaining despite being formulaic.
