= Sugamana Raagangal =

- DVD cover
- Directed by: R. Sundarrajan
- Written by: R. Sundarrajan
- Produced by: C. M. Aruchamy; C. M. Nanjappan
- Starring: Sivakumar; Saritha; Jeevitha; Rajeev
- Cinematography: Rajarajan
- Edited by: R. Bhaskaran; B. Krishnakumar
- Music by: M. S. Viswanathan
- Production company: Durga Bhagavathi Films
- Release date: 3 May 1985
- Running time: 139 minutes
- Country: India
- Language: Tamil

Sugamana Raagangal (transl. Soothing ragas) is a 1985 Indian Tamil-language film written and directed by R. Sundarrajan. The film stars Sivakumar, Saritha, Jeevitha and Rajeev. It was released on 3 May 1985.

== Cast ==
- Sivakumar
- Saritha
- Jeevitha
- Rajeev
- Nizhalgal Ravi
- V. Gopalakrishnan
- Poornam Viswanathan (guest appearance)
- T. K. S. Chandran
- Karikolraj
- Pasi Narayanan
- V. M. John
- Madhan
- Kovai I. S. Murugesh
- Ragini
- Ravichandran

== Production ==
The film was originally titled Ennai Therinja Sollathinga. The film marked the acting debut of musician I. S. Murugesh who went on to be known as Meesai Murugesan. A court scene was shot at Vauhini Studios, and a silambam scene was shot at Needur village near Mettupalayam.

== Soundtrack ==
The soundtrack was composed by M. S. Viswanathan. The title song is sung by Ilayaraja. All lyrics written by Vaali.

Track listing
| No. | Title | Singer(s) | Length |
|---|---|---|---|
| 1. | "Aathai Kadakka" | S. P. Balasubrahmanyam, P. Susheela | 4:25 |
| 2. | "Ennai Therinja" | S. P. Balasubrahmanyam, Vani Jairam | 4:39 |
| 3. | "Maaman Magane" | Vani Jairam, Malaysia Vasudevan | 4:52 |
| 4. | "Moondram Pirai" | P. Susheela | 4:53 |
| 5. | "Un Uthadu" | S. P. Balasubrahmanyam, Vani Jairam | 4:23 |
| 6. | "Athangara Mettumela (title song)" | Ilayaraja | 4.00 |
| Total length: | | | 27:12 |

== Critical reception ==
Jayamanmadhan of Kalki wrote the film's first half is sandalwood paste, and the second half is sewer mud.
