= Paartha Gnabagam Illayo (film) =

- Directed by: Nagesh
- Produced by: M. R. M. Arunachalam
- Starring: Anand Babu; Ramya Krishnan
- Music by: M. S. Viswanathan
- Production company: AR Enterprises
- Release date: 14 September 1985
- Running time: 120 minutes
- Country: India
- Language: Tamil

Paartha Gnabagam Illayo (transl. Remember seeing it?) is a 1985 Indian Tamil language drama film directed by Nagesh, in his only directing credit. The film stars Anand Babu and Ramya Krishnan, the latter in dual roles. It was released on 14 September 1985.

== Plot ==
Twin sisters Kasthuri and Lalitha are separated at a very young age and Kasthuri is raised by someone who had greed for money and a lavish lifestyle. He planned to marry Kasthuri to a rich old man, even after knowing that she was in love with Rathnam. Meanwhile, Lalitha is married to her dream man and lives happily with him. Rathnam coincidentally meets Lalitha and mistakes her for Kasthuri. Resolving confusions and reuniting the two sisters form the crux of the story.

== Cast ==
- Anand Babu as Rathnam
- Ramya Krishnan as Kasthuri / Lalitha
- Hema Choudhary
- Radha Ravi
- Rajeev
- Thengai Srinivasan
- R. S. Manohar

== Production ==
Paartha Gnabagam Illayo is the only film directed by Nagesh. K. S. Ravikumar worked as an assistant director. While rehearsing a sequence at Nagesh's residence with Anand Babu involving a toy gun which had a bullet made of lead, Ravikumar accidentally shot Ramya Krishnan's mother in her shoulder, although it was non-life threatening and the bullet was surgically removed. A police case was registered, but closed after Ramya Krishnan's mother revealed that it was a prank.

== Soundtrack ==
The soundtrack album was composed by M. S. Viswanathan. Lyrics we're written by Vaali.

Track listing
No.	Title	Singer(s)	Length
1.	"Ettuthikkum Ethivida"	S. P. Balasubrahmanyam
2.	"Aanandha Veenai"	S. P. Balasubrahmanyam, Vani Jairam
3.	"Kannai Chimittum"	S. P. Balasubrahmanyam, P. Susheela
4.	"Thanni Kaettein"	S. Janaki

== Critical reception ==
Balumani of Anna praised the acting of Ramya Krishnan and other cast but felt Anand Babu dances well more than acting and noted Nagesh's direction as okay.
