= Naane Raja Naane Mandhiri =

- DVD cover
- Directed by: Balu Anand
- Screenplay by: R. Sundarrajan
- Story by: Balu Anand
- Produced by: Thooyavan
- Starring: Vijayakanth; Radhika; Jeevitha
- Cinematography: Rajarajan
- Edited by: R. Vittal; C. Lancy
- Music by: Ilaiyaraaja
- Production company: Appu Movies
- Release date: 6 July 1985
- Running time: 136 minutes
- Country: India
- Language: Tamil

Naane Raja Naane Mandhiri (transl. I am both the king and minister) is a 1985 Indian Tamil-language comedy drama film, directed by Balu Anand (in his directorial debut) and written by R. Sundarrajan from a story by the former. The film stars Vijayakanth, Radhika and Jeevitha. It was released on 6 July 1985. The film was remade in Telugu as Nene Raju Nene Mantri (1987).

== Plot ==
A self-centered egoistic village zamindar who makes fun of people, is rude by nature and brash tries to accommodate a teacher who comes to his village. She gets to understand him. His uncle's daughter adversely reacts to his tantrums, but steps up.

== Cast ==
- Vijayakanth as Rangamani
- Radhika as Bhagyalakshmi
- Jeevitha as Savithri
- Goundamani as Kuppusamy
- Senthil as Naakuthuruthi
- Sivaraman as Puliyankottai
- Vasantha
- Kovai Sarala as Subbatha
- C. R. Parthiban as Drama Troupe Harmonist
- Kumarimuthu
- Idichapuli Selvaraj
- Kullamani as Kulaiyan
- Tirupur Ramasamy as Ramasamy
- Swaminathan as Kathavarayan
- Manimaran as Marudhu

== Production ==
Balu Anand, who worked as an assistant to R. Sundarrajan, made his directorial debut with this film. Sundarrajan wrote the film's screenplay and dialogues. The film was produced by Thooyavan and Panchu Arunachalam under Appu Movies, making it their second production venture after the success off Vaidehi Kathirundhal. This was a rare comedy film for Vijayakanth, then known mainly for his action hero roles. The film was shot in Karnataka and Maduranthakam, Chennai.

== Soundtrack ==
The music was composed by Ilaiyaraaja. The song "Mayanginen Solla Thayanginen" is set to the Carnatic raga Charukesi.

Song	Singers	Lyrics	Length
"Mayanginen Solla Thayanginen"	Jayachandran, Susheela	Vaali	04:16
"Thegam Sirakadikkum"	Jayachandran, Chithra	Mu. Metha	04:34
"Ilasa Sirusa"	Gangai Amaran, S. N. Surendar	Vaali	03:51
"Kelaayo Kanna"	Susheela, Usha Srinivasan	Vaali	04:52
"Manthakasamudan"	Ilaiyaraaja, T. S. Raghavendra, S. P. Sailaja, Gangai Amaran	Gangai Amaran	04:53

== Critical reception ==
Jayamanmadhan of Kalki wrote that the film, which went briskly, went lame until the climax, but praised the humour and Ilaiyaraaja's music. Balumani of Anna appreciated Sundarrajan's writing, Balu Anand's direction and Ilaiyaraaja's music, appreciating the climax for its newness.
