= Remo (disambiguation) =

Remo is an American drum skin company.

Remo may also refer to:

== Languages ==
- Remo language (disambiguation), several languages of Peru
- Bonda language or Remo, a language in India

== People with the surname ==
- Chris Remo, American video game designer
- Jeanette Solstad Remø, Norwegian activist

== People with the given name ==
- Remo De Angelis (1926–2014), Italian film actor, stunt man and painter
- Remo D'Souza (born 1974), Indian dancer, choreographer, actor and film director
- Remo Fernandes (born 1953), Indian singer
- Remo Holsmer (born 1980), Estonian politician

=== Fictional ===
- Remo Williams, the main character in The Destroyer novel series by Warren Murphy and Richard Sapir
- Remo Gaggi, a character in the 1995 film Casino

== Other uses ==
- Remo, British Columbia, a community in BC, Canada
- Remo (film), a 2016 Indian film
  - Remo (soundtrack)
- Remo (grape) or Riesling, a German wine grape variety
- Remo North, a Local Government Area in Ogun State, Nigeria
- Bonda people or Remo, a tribe of people in southwestern Orissa, India
- Clube do Remo, a Brazilian football club
- Remo Stars F.C., a football club in Nigeria
- Remo Williams: The Adventure Begins, 1986 American film

== See also ==
- San Remo (disambiguation)
- Remo Drive, an American rock band
- Remus (disambiguation)
- Remo
