= Kuthur Ramakrishnan Srinivasan =

- Born: 1910; Tiruchirappalli, Tamil Nadu, India
- Died: 30 November 1992 (aged 81–82); Tiruchirappalli, Tamil Nadu, India
- Occupations: Archeologist, historian
- Known for: archeological work and writings on the Cave Temples of Mahabalipuram
- Awards: 1991 Padma Bhushan

Kuthur Ramakrishnan Srinivasan (1910 – 30 November 1992) was an Indian archeologist, historian and the author of a number of books on Indian history and culture. He was best known for his archeological work on the Cave Temples of Mahabalipuram. The Government of India awarded him the Padma Bhushan, the third highest civilian award, in 1991.

== Biography ==
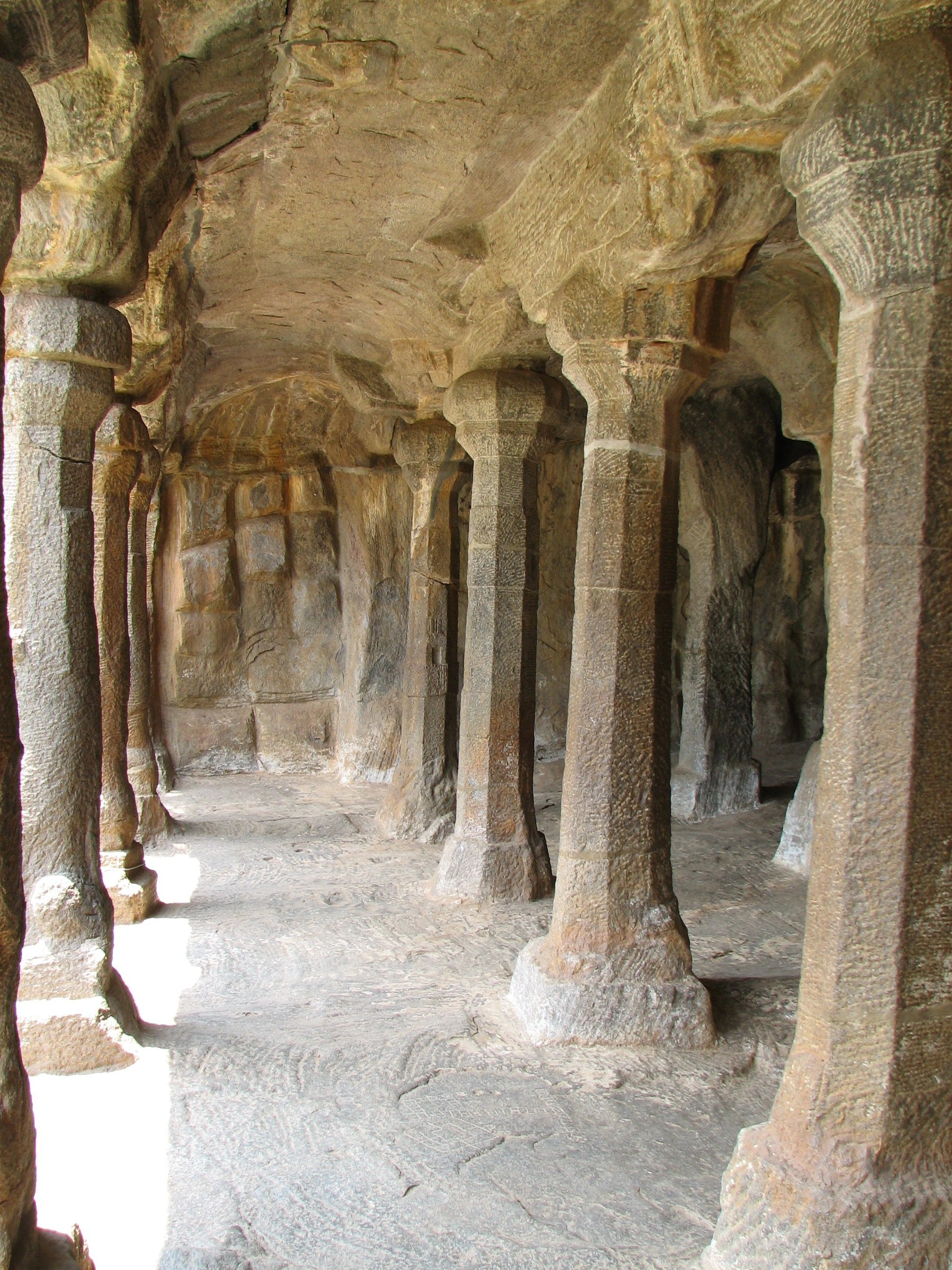
India - Mamallapuram - 022 - Cave pillars (4333675697)

K. R. Srinivasan was born in 1910 at Tiruchirapalli, a temple town in the south Indian state of Tamil Nadu. Choosing botany as subject, he secured an MSc from the University of Madras after completing the course at Presidency College, Chennai and started his career at St. Joseph's College, Trichy as a lecturer of botany. His elder brother, K. R. Venkataraman, was a noted historian and the elder brother's work on Pudukottai was reported to have inspired Srinivasan to take up archaeology. In 1936, he joined Pudukottai museum as its curator. Later, when the museum was taken up by the Archaeological Survey of India and renamed as the Government Museum, Pudukkottai, he continued there until his official retirement from service in 1968 as its deputy director general.

During his service, Srinivasan undertook several archaeological missions in Puducherry, Andhra Pradesh and Tamil Nadu of which the most notable one was his work on the Cave Temples of Mahabalipuram. He documented the temples from Pallava period and published a book, the Temples of South India which has since been translated into Hindi and Tamil languages and is a prescribed text for academic studies. He also published another book, the Cave-temples of the Pallavas based on his work in Mahabalipuram. It was during this research, he discovered a hidden passage in one of the temples leading to a series of carvings depicting 81 karanas. Later, he studied the Buddha statues at Borobudur and his studies of Buddha were also documented as a book, The Story of Buddha; this book is a part of secondary school curriculum in Tamil Nadu. The Harappan and the Vedic Cultures and The Age of Vidyaranya were two of his other books.

Srinivasan guided Padma Subrahmanyam, a noted Indian Bharatanatyam dancer, in her doctoral studies on the karanas. After retirement, he moved back to his native place, Trichy, and it was here he died in 1992, at the age of 82.

== Awards and honors ==
Srinivasan was honored by the Government of India with the Padma Bhushan, the third highest civilian award in 1991, a year before his death. His birth centenary was observed in 2011 by the Archaeological Survey of India, as a mark of honor. On the occasion, a festschrift was also released under the title, Sivasri : perspectives in Indian archaeology, art and culture : birth centenary volume of Padma Bushan Dr. C. Sivaramamurti and Padma Bushan Sh. K.R. Srinivasan.

== Bibliography ==
- Srinivasan, K. R. (1964). Cave-temples of the Pallavas. Architectural survey of temples no. 1. New Delhi: Archaeological Survey of India.
- K. R.. Venkataraman; M. K.. Venkatarama Iyer; Kuthur Ramakrishna Srinivasan (1976). The Age of Vidyaranya. Kalpa Printers and Publishers.
- K. R. Srinivasan (1985). Temples of South India. National Book Trust. ISBN 978-81-237-0487-6.
- Kuthur Ramakrishna Srinivasan (1988). The Harappan and the Vedic Cultures: Musings on Some Moot Problems. Director of Museums, Government Museum.
- Kuthur Ramakrishna Srinivasan (1996). Dakshin Bharat Ke Mandir. National Book Trust. ISBN 978-81-237-1867-5.
- R., Srinivasan, K. (2011). Ten̲n̲intiyak kōyilkaḷ. Pututilli: National Book Trust. ISBN 978-8123716404. OCLC 298380779.
- Kuthur Ramakrishna Srinivasan. The Story of Buddha. E.M. Gopalakrishna Kone.

== See also ==
- Group of Monuments at Mahabalipuram
- Unfinished Buddha
