= Rum (film) =

2017 film by Sai Bharath

- Official poster
- Directed by: Sai Bharath
- Produced by: T. Vijayaraghavendra
- Starring: Hrishikesh; Vivek; Narain; Sanchita Shetty; Miya
- Cinematography: Vignesh Vasu; Arun
- Edited by: Sathyaraj Natarajan
- Music by: Anirudh Ravichander
- Production company: All In Pictures
- Release date: 17 February 2017
- Country: India
- Language: Tamil

Rum (English: Verdict) is a 2017 Indian Tamil language horror comedy thriller film written and directed by Sai Bharath. Featuring Hrishikesh, Vivek, Narain, Sanchita Shetty and Miya in the lead roles, the film's score and soundtrack is composed by Anirudh Ravichander. The film began production during early 2016 and was released on 17 February 2017.

== Plot ==
The film starts with two men enter a haunted bungalow and gets killed by a mysterious force. The story then shifts to Shiva who along with his thief gang stole some expensive stones which was going to be displayed in hyderabad museum. While fleeing the gang is blackmailed by a police officer Thomas. To hide from Thomas the gang hides in a bungalow in the forest. After entering the house the gang experience paranormal activity. One of their members Nepali turns out to be Thomas's man who informs him about the gangs whereabouts. Nepali gets killed by the ghost. Thomas seeks help from a paranormal investigator who ask him to get a mercury stone to save him from the ghosts. Shiva, his girlfriend Riya and Raj see a flashback which reveal Thomas's men including Nepali, killing a young boy and an old man, while Thomas raped and murdered Thulasi in the same bungalow. As Shiva and his gang escape from the bungalow, Thomas gets killed by the ghosts. The film ends with Shiva, Riya, Raj and Kural having a vacation and selling the stolen gems.

== Cast ==
- Hrishikesh as Shiva
- Vivek as Raj
- Narain as Inspector Praveen Thomas
- Sanchita Shetty as Riya
- Miya as Thulasi
- Amzath Khan as Suresh (Nepali)
- Arjun Chidambaram as Kural
- Andreanne as a Russian lady
- Venkat Subha

== Production ==
The film began pre-production works during October 2015, with composer Anirudh Ravichander revealing that he would work on a film titled Rum directed by Sai Bharath and starring his cousin, Hrishikesh, in the lead role. The project was announced to be funded by All in Pictures, while the director stated that it would be a "horror-heist film". After completing a course in filmmaking in Canada, Sai Bharath had finished the script three years prior to the beginning of the shoot. He had approached Hrishikesh, who was looking to appear in his first lead role, after playing a supporting role in Velaiilla Pattadhari (2014). In February 2016, the film's first look poster was unveiled, with Sanchita Shetty and Miya revealed as the film's lead actresses. Narain, Vivek and Amzath Khan were also announced to be playing supporting roles in the film. The title Rum was revealed by the makers to be an ancient Tamil word meaning "verdict", rather than the alcohol as widely presumed. The shoot of the film began in February 2016 in Chennai and was finished by June 2016. During May 2016, the team shot for a fast-paced gaana song titled "Peiyo Phobilia" in a dense forest in Padappai and set up a campsite on location. The final schedule for the film began on 1 June 2016 and carried on for fifteen days until completion.

== Soundtrack ==
Rum

Soundtrack album by Anirudh Ravichander
- Released: 2 November 2016
- Recorded: 2015–16
- Language: Tamil
- Label: Sony Music
- Producer: Anirudh Ravichander

Anirudh Ravichander chronology
Remo (2016)	Rum (2016)	Vivegam (2017)

Singles from Rum
- 1. "Hola Amigo" Released: 26 April 2016; 2. "Peiyophobilia" Released: 22 September 2016

The film's music was composed by Anirudh Ravichander, while the audio rights of the film was acquired by Sony Music. The album released on 2 November 2016 at an event held at Park Hyatt, Chennai with the lead cast and crew in attendance. Prior to the release of the album, a single track titled "Hola Amigo" was released in April 2016. Anirudh collaborated with Malaysian rapper Balan Kashmir for the song which carried the theme of intolerance, and the song subsequently went viral on social media after it was promoted by American DJ Diplo. A second single, "Peiyophobilia", was also released in September 2016 and featured vocals by actor Silambarasan, who collaborated on a film soundtrack with Anirudh for the first time. Behindwoods.com stated "Rum is an EDM intoxicant from Anirudh, which is addictive".

Track list
No.	Title	Lyrics	Singer(s)	Length
1.	"Hola Amigo"	Madhan Karky, Balan Kashmir	Anirudh Ravichander, Balan Kashmir	4:19
2.	"Peiyophobilia"	Vivek	Silambarasan, Anirudh Ravichander	3:17
3.	"Kadavulae Vidai"	Vivek	Sean Roldan & Additional Vocals By Pragathi Guruprasad	4:02
4.	"Kadavulae Vidai (Reprise)"	Vivek	Anirudh Ravichander	3:22
5.	"Pori Pathi Vizhum"	Vivek, Divine	Diwakar, Divine	3:06
6.	"Hola Senorita"	Madhan Karky	Anirudh Ravichander	3:31
7.	"Alladhe Siragiye"	Vivek	Sid Sriram	3:42

== Release and reception ==
Originally produced by Vijay Raghavendra, the film’s Tamil Nadu theatrical rights were sold to Shri Sai Circuit 6000, with the makers releasing the film in 150 screens across Tamil Nadu. Upon release, the film received a positive review from The New Indian Express, with the critic stating "in the first half, both horror and humour have worked out well", "in the second half that the plot loses steam" but "it peps up again towards the end". In contrast, Baradwaj Rangan of The Hindu wrote "Rum feels incoherent, and you wonder if it’s because the director was trying to be avant-garde, or whether he just ran out of film", stating that "the film has no spirit". A reviewer from Sify.com stated "Rum is an average horror comedy" and that the "major problem with Rum is that technically the film is amateurish and delivers very little in terms of novelty". The reviewer added the film "has more laugh-out-loud moments than jump-in-your-seat jolts" and that "it is just dull, lazy film making from debutant director Sai Bharath". Behindwoods.com states it was "a horror comedy that has nothing new to offer", concluding that "the film lacks clarity and moves cluelessly in its initial moments".
