= Hrishikesh (actor) =

Indian actor

- Occupation: Actor
- Years active: 2014-present
- Relatives: Krishnaswami Subrahmanyam (great-grandfather); Dhanush (brother-in-law); Anirudh Ravichander (cousin); Padma Subrahmanyam (grand-aunt); S. Krishnaswamy (grand-uncle)

Hrishikesh is an Indian actor who predominantly works in Tamil cinema. He is best known for his performance in Velaiilla Pattadhari and its sequel.

== Personal life ==
Hrishikesh's grandfather is S. V. Ramanan, and his great-grandfather is Krishnaswami Subrahmanyam. He is the cousin of music director Anirudh Ravichander and the brother-in-law of actor Dhanush, from the latter's ex-wife's side.

== Early life and career ==
Hrishikesh did his schooling from PSBB (KKN) and then studied Visual Communication from Madras University where he was involved in a lot of creative projects. He then assisted Jayendra, working in ads and documentaries.

He made his acting debut portraying Dhanush's younger brother in Velaiilla Pattadhari (2014). For the role, he received an SMS from Dhanush's production office, which asked him to audition for the role. He was selected after his screen test ended successfully. He reprised his role in the film's sequel, Velaiilla Pattadhari 2 (2017). He has also played lead roles in Rum (2016), and Bommala Koluvu (2022), making his Telugu debut with the latter.

== Filmography ==
Year	Film	Role	Notes
2014	Velaiilla Pattadhari	Karthik	
2017	Rum	Siva	
2017	Velaiilla Pattadhari 2	Karthik	
2021	Annaatthe	Groom	
2022	Bommala Koluvu	Rudra	Telugu film
2024	Unarvugal Thodarkadhai	Karthik	
2024	The Greatest of All Time	Menon's henchman	credited as Rishikesh
TBA	Rekla		Filming
