= Velaiilla Pattadhari 2 =

2017 film by Soundarya Rajinikanth

- Theatrical release poster in Tamil
- Directed by: Soundarya Rajinikanth
- Screenplay by: Soundarya Rajinikanth
- Story by: Dhanush
- Produced by: Kalaipuli S. Thanu; Dhanush
- Starring: Dhanush; Kajol; Amala Paul; Vivek; Hrishikesh; Samuthirakani; Saranya Ponvannan
- Cinematography: Sameer Thahir
- Edited by: Prasanna GK
- Music by: Sean Roldan (songs and background score); Anirudh Ravichander (background score only)
- Production companies: V Creations; Wunderbar Films
- Distributed by: V Creations
- Release dates: 11 August 2017 (Tamil); 25 August 2017 (Telugu)
- Running time: 129 minutes
- Country: India
- Language: Tamil
- Budget: ₹43 crore

Velaiilla Pattadhari 2 (transl. The unemployed graduate 2), also referred to as VIP 2, is a 2017 Indian Tamil-language action comedy film directed by Soundarya Rajinikanth, who also wrote the screenplay, thus replacing Velraj, based on a story by the co-producer Dhanush. It is a sequel to the 2014 film Velaiilla Pattadhari and has Dhanush, Amala Paul, Vivek, Hrishikesh, Saranya Ponvannan, and Samuthirakani reprising their roles, while Kajol plays an antagonistic role, marking her return to Tamil cinema 20 years after her last film, Minsara Kanavu (1997). Ritu Varma was recast as Anita, earlier played by Surbhi, which marks her debut in Tamil cinema. Some of Dhanush's scenes were partially reshot in Telugu. The music was composed by Sean Roldan.

VIP 2 was released worldwide on 11 August 2017 to mixed reviews.

== Plot ==
Two years after the events of Velaiilla Pattadhari, Raghuvaran wins the Civil Engineer of the Year 2016 Award and is an executive member of his company now, along with a parking spot. His wife, Dr. Shalini, becomes an authoritative, nagging wife who controls him. She has resigned from her job to take care of the household, after marriage. Raghuvaran is also dismissive about his wife getting another job. Raghuvaran efficiently completes construction projects assigned to him, with the help of about 200 unemployed young civil, mechanical and electrical engineers, who are his friends. Vasundhara, the chairman of a big construction company in South India, Vasundhara Constructions, witnesses the announcement of Raghuvaran's victory at the Engineer of the Year 2016 Awards and finds out about him. She makes Raghuvaran a job offer, but he humbly refuses.

Later, Raghuvaran's project team and Vasundhara's top team are invited at the same time to exhibit their models for a proposed private medical college and hospital building to a very rich and native trader. Vasundhara exhibits her project with heavy pride and ego, while Raghuvaran explains his project in a simple manner. The trader gives the project to Anitha Constructions. Raghuvaran provides some polite advice to Vasundhara outside the building. This offends her, and she begins to go after him, placing one obstacle after another. First, she uses her influence in the state cabinet to force the trader to give the project back to her. She then makes counter-bids on all of Anitha Construction's projects at a lower price, causing the company to lose their own projects. Raghuvaran learns of this and quits his own job just to save his first company.

He is approached by the son of a Delhi-based construction mogul, with the idea of starting a new construction company with 50-50 shares. Raghuvaran agrees by putting his house under a mortgage of five million rupees and starts "VIP" Constructions with the 200 unemployed engineers as the company's employees. They don't get to start projects for a month. Due to word of mouth, they get an offer from Prakash, a greedy businessman who wants to build a theme park in a marshy land. Raghuvaran's gang gets excited, but the soil tests prove them wrong. So, they declined the project. Prakash bribes an executive member of Vasundhara Constructions and makes her start on the same project. Raghuvaran's team starts a protest, and a countrywide uproar causes the project to be stopped by the government. Prakash is caught up in various lawsuits filed across the country. This causes a bad name and a loss of projects for Vasundhara Constructions. To eliminate Raghuvaran, she targets his company. She anonymously buys the 50% shares held by Raghuvaran, when they are legally up for sale to create funds. Raghuvaran is fired from VIP Constructions by Vasundhara, causing the employees to quit their own jobs immediately.

That night, Prakash sends goons to kill Raghuvaran, but Raghuvaran beats them all up. He thinks that Vasundhara sent them and goes to her office room in her company's main headquarters building. Vasundhara is alone in the building, as she is currently thinking about the loyalty of all the employees of VIP Constructions towards Raghuvaran. Raghuvaran initially berates, then advises Vasundhara, and starts to leave. Unfortunately, the office is flooded due to a heavy downpour, and they are trapped on their floor. They then cooperate to find biscuits and wine on the top floor.

After a deep conversation, Vasundhara undergoes a change of heart. As the rain stops, Raghuvaran takes Vasundhara to his home, where they share a meal and Vasundhara bonds with the family. She announces that she will return VIP Constructions to Raghuvaran. The movie ends with Raghuvaran declaring that people consider him a villain but he, in fact, is a hero.

== Cast ==
- Dhanush as Raghuvaran, Anitha Constructions civil engineer
- Kajol as Vasundhara Parameshwar, Vasundhara Constructions chairman (Voice dubbed by Deepa Venkat)
- Amala Paul as Dr. Shalini Raghuvaran, Raghuvaran's wife (Voice dubbed by Savitha Reddy)
- Vivek as Azhagusundaram, Raghuvaran's partner
- Hrishikesh as Karthik, Raghuvaran's brother
- Samuthirakani as Krishnamoorthy, Raghuvaran's father
- Saranya Ponvannan as Bhuvana, Raghuvaran's mother (posthumously photo appearance)
- Meera Krishnan as Shalini's mother
- Saravana Subbiah as Prakash, a greedy businessman
- Cell Murugan as Manickam, Raghuvaran's assistant
- Balaji Mohan as Balaji
- G. M. Kumar as Chettiyar
- Florent Pereira as Ponnuangam
- M. J. Shriram as Ramkumar, Anitha's father
- S. Kathiresan as Shalini's father
- Lokesh as Vasundhara's manager
- Kimu Gopal as Bank Manager
- Kishore Rajkumar as Raghuvaran's friend
- Mirchi Vijay as Raghuvaran's friend
- Put Chutney Rajmohan as Prakash's lawyer
- Sethupathi Jayaychandran as M. S. Arivazhagan
- Andrews as Newsreader
- Som Shekar as Vasundhara's escort
- Priyadarshini Rajkumar as Client
- Ritu Varma as Anitha (cameo appearance)
- Raiza Wilson as Vasundhara's PA (cameo appearance)
- Sijoy Varghese as Vasundhara's father (photo credit)

== Production ==
=== Development ===
After their 2014 film, Velaiilla Pattadhari, Velraj and Dhanush worked on the production of Thangamagan (2015), which was initially widely reported to be a sequel to their previous film. During the production stages of the film, Dhanush denied that this was the case and confirmed it was a different script. Later, in mid-2016, Dhanush's sister-in-law, Soundarya Rajinikanth agreed to terms with producer N. Ramasamy and Hema Rukmai to make a romantic drama film titled Nilavuku En Mel Ennadi Kobam and cast Dhanush in the lead role. Despite negotiations with actresses including Sonam Kapoor, Kajal Aggarwal and Manjima Mohan, the project failed to materialise, and in a sudden turn of events, Dhanush revealed that he would instead collaborate with Soundarya for a sequel to his earlier film Velaiilla Pattadhari. The film was revealed to be co-produced by N. Ramasamy, while the latter would also write the script of the film. Sean Roldon was signed to replace Anirudh as the film's composer, while the theme music composed by Anirudh was retained in the new project. During the launch event of the film, it was announced that Sameer Thahir would work as the cinematographer, while Prasanna GK would be the editor. The film was originally shot in Tamil while certain scenes of Dhanush were additionally filmed in Telugu due to the success of Raghuvaran B Tech, the Telugu dubbed version of Velaiilla Pattadhari. The film was also subsequently dubbed and released into Hindi as VIP 2 - Lalkar with Kajol dubbing for herself.

=== Casting ===
Casting for the film began in late 2016, with several members of the original cast, including Amala Paul, Samuthirakani, Vivek and Hrishikesh retained for the sequel. Saranya, whose character died in the first film, was also selected to portray a role. Hindi film actress Kajol was also selected to play a pivotal role in the film, which marks her comeback in Tamil cinema after nearly 20 years.

=== Filming ===
Production on the film began on 15 December 2016, with actor Rajinikanth in attendance at the launch event in his family's Poes Garden home in Chennai. The team filmed a promo song in Mumbai, choreographed by Bosco and Caesar. Filming ended in May 2017.

== Soundtrack ==
Velaiilla Pattadhari 2 (Original Motion Picture Soundtrack)

Soundtrack album by Sean Roldan
- Released: 1 July 2017
- Genre: Feature film soundtrack
- Length: 15:45
- Language: Tamil
- Label: Wunderbar Films
- Producers: Sean Roldan; Dhanush

Sean Roldan chronology
Neruppu Da (2017)	Velaiilla Pattadhari 2 (Original Motion Picture Soundtrack) (2017)	Kaathiruppor Pattiyal (2018)

The soundtrack was composed by Sean Roldan. The tracklist featuring five tracks was released on 1 July 2017 at Mumbai. Some themes that were highlights of the characters and title were retained from the first film, composed by Anirudh Ravichander.

Track list

Original track list
No.	Title	Lyrics	Singer(s)	Length
1.	"Life of Raghuvaran — Nada Da Raja"	Dhanush	Dhanush, Yogi B	3:29
2.	"Angel of Raghuvaran — Iraivanai Thandha Iraiviye"	Dhanush	Sean Roldan, M M Manasi	3:12
3.	"Torture of Raghuvaran — Ucchathula"	Dhanush	Dhanush	3:38
4.	"Raghuvaran Vs Vasundhara — Dooram Nillu"	Sean Roldan	Benny Dayal, Dhanush, Shakthisree Gopalan	3:13
5.	"Theme Track — Vasundhara- The Empress Arrives"		Instrumental	2:10
Total length:				15:45

Telugu tracklist
No.	Title	Lyrics	Singer(s)	Length
1.	"Life of Raghuvaran — Nada Da Raja"	Anantha Sriram	Rahul Nambiar, Yogi B	3:30
2.	"Angel of Raghuvaran — Iruvuram Kaadu"	Anantha Sriram	Sean Roldan, M M Manasi	3:14
3.	"Torture of Raghuvaran — Pellanade"	Chandrabose	Ravi G	3:06
4.	"Raghuvaran Vs Vasundhara — Dooram Nuvve Undaloi"	Chandra Bose	K G Ranjith, Ananya Thirumalai	3:15
5.	"Theme Track — Vasundhara- The Empress Arrives"		Instrumental	2:10
Total length:				15:15

Hindi tracklist
No.	Title	Lyrics	Singer(s)	Length
1.	"Life of Raghuvaran — Chal Re Raja"	Raqueeb Alam	Rahul Nambiar, Yogi B	3:30
2.	"Angel of Raghuvaran — Tu Mili Hai"	Raqueeb Alam	Abhay Jodhpurkar, M. M. Manasi	3:14
3.	"Torture of Raghuvaran — Main Ga Raha"	Raqueeb Alam	Ranjith	3:06
4.	"Raghuvaran Vs Vasundhara — Doori Zara Banake"	Raqueeb Alam	Benny Dayal, Shakthisree Gopalan	3:15
5.	"Theme Track — Vasundhara- The Empress Arrives"		Instrumental	2:10
Total length:				15:15

== Release ==
The film was originally planned to release on 28 July 2017, coinciding with Dhanush's birthday, but was postponed to 11 August 2017. The Hindi version of this film was released on 18 August 2017 and Telugu version was released on 25 August 2017.

== Reception ==
The film received mixed reviews from critics and audience. On the review aggregator website Rotten Tomatoes, 20% of 5 critics' reviews are positive, with an average rating of 3.5/10.

Baradwaj Rangan of Film Companion wrote "But then, this is not just a lazy rehash like the Singam films...there’s a sensibility here...VIP 2 is by no means a great film, but given the constraints of a "mass" movie, especially a sequel, it left me pleasantly surprised.".

Regarding the Telugu version, a critic from The Hindu called the film a "wasted opportunity" and criticized the film's inaccurate use of license plates and the references to film stars.

=== Box office ===
The film collected approximately ₹5.75 crore (US$610,000) in Tamil Nadu in first day, ₹18.75 crore (US$2.0 million) in three days and ₹24 crore (US$2.6 million) in five days.
