= Unarvugal Thodarkadhai =

- Theatrical release poster
- Directed by: Balu Sharma
- Written by: Balu Sharma
- Produced by: Sameer Bharath Ram
- Starring: Hrishikesh; Sherlin Seth
- Cinematography: Sundar Ram krishnan
- Edited by: Kiran; Deselva
- Music by: Hari Dafusia; Amin Mirza; Ajmal Khan
- Production company: Super Talkies
- Release date: 8 March 2024
- Country: India
- Language: Tamil

Unarvugal Thodarkadhai (transl. Beginning story of emotions) is 2024 Indian Tamil-language romantic drama film directed by Balu Sharma and starring Hrishikesh and Sherlin Seth. The film was released after a four year delay. The film's title is based on a song from Aval Appadithan (1978).

== Cast ==
- Hrishikesh as Karthik
- Sherlin Seth as Priya
- RJ Ajai Titus as Karthik's friend
- Sriranjani
- VJ Adams

== Production ==
Hrishikesh plays a software professional who is forced into marriage by his parents. Miss India Tamil Nadu 2017 winner Sherlin Seth plays a business development manager.

== Soundtrack ==
The music was composed by Hari Dafusia, Amin Mirza and Ajmal Khan.

Track listing
No.	Title	Lyrics	Music	Singer(s)	Length
1.	"Koba Kanalgal Theeradha"	Madhan	Amin Mirza	Gowtham Bharadwaj	4:06
2.	"Alaya"	Ko Sesha, Jay Kha Ra, Hari Dafusia	Hari Dafusia	Nikhita Gandhi, Hari Dafusia	3:46
3.	"Minsaaramaai"	Ko Sesha	Hari Dafusia	Sreekanth Hariharan. Hari Dafusia	3:36
4.	"Thodarum Kadhaiyaaga"	Naveen Bharathi	Ajmal Khan	Devan Ekambaram, Niharika Patro	3:17
Total length:					14:45

== Reception ==
A critic from The Times of India rated the film two out of five stars and wrote that "There are interesting moments in the film that are intriguing but are never delved into" and added that "It’s as if the makers were dead sure that they wanted to make a film that remained surface-level and didn’t go even a little deeper". A critic from Maalai Malar gave the film the same rating and wrote that most of the scenes with both the hero and the heroine are uninteresting, criticising the weak screenplay.
