= Sulthan (2021 film) =

2021 film by Bakkiyaraj Kannan

- Theatrical release poster
- Directed by: Bakkiyaraj Kannan
- Written by: Bakkiyaraj Kannan
- Dialogue by: Arul Kumar Rajasekaran
- Produced by: S. R. Prakash Babu; S. R. Prabhu
- Starring: Karthi Rashmika Mandanna Ramachandra Raju
- Cinematography: Sathyan Sooryan
- Edited by: Ruben
- Music by: Score: Yuvan Shankar Raja; Songs: Vivek–Mervin
- Production company: Dream Warrior Pictures
- Release date: 2 April 2021
- Running time: 155 minutes
- Country: India
- Language: Tamil

Sulthan is a 2021 Indian Tamil-language action drama film directed by Bakkiyaraj Kannan and produced by Dream Warrior Pictures. The film stars Karthi in titular role, alongside Rashmika Mandanna and Ramachandra Raju in their debuts in Tamil cinema, while Napoleon, Lal, Yogi Babu and Nawab Shah appear in supporting roles. The soundtrack and score were composed by Vivek–Mervin and Yuvan Shankar Raja respectively, while the cinematography and editing were handled by Sathyan Sooryan and Ruben respectively.

Sulthan was released in theatres on 2 April 2021. The film became an average venture at the box office, mainly because of theatre closures due to the COVID-19 pandemic.

== Plot ==
In 1986, Sethupathi is a crime boss in Madras who has a gang of 100 gangsters working as vigilantes. One day, Sethupathi's enemies barge into their house to kill Sethupathi. The baby kicks his stomach, making his wife Annalakshmi go into labour. The gang beats the intruders while Sethupathi is with Annalakshmi.

Annalakshmi gives birth to a boy, but she dies. Sethupathi gives the boy to his right-hand man, Mansoor, who names him Vikram, a.k.a Sulthan. The gang raises Sulthan with love and care, and Sulthan sees them as his brothers. Sulthan grows up and goes abroad to pursue Robotics Engineering.

In 2021, a village head in Salem requests the killing of Jayaseelan, a ruthless and violent gangster who killed many farmers and burned their lands. Sethupathi promises to kill Jayaseelan, but when Mansoor asks him, he promises to do something good with the head's case. Meanwhile, Sulthan arrives at the village in great splendour. One day, a few people who pose as pizza delivery men attack the gang. They injure Sethupathi and a member of the gang, who is critical and admitted to the hospital.

The thug's mother is distraught, leaving Sulthan tarnished. Sulthan confronts Sethupathi and tells him he will never return, leading to his death. At Sethupathi's funeral, Sulthan learns from his lawyer that the attackers were police officers sent by Commissioner Manickavel to kill Sethupathi. He asks Manickavel for an opportunity to reform the gang, which Commissioner Manickavel gives him six months for, but not a single case to file. Mansoor sends twenty men, including Otta Lorry, to kill Jayaseelan, but Sulthan forbids them. They try to sneak out, but Sulthan catches them. Otta Lorry lies about having a marriage proposal in the village.

Sulthan takes his entire gang to a village to avoid trouble, and the town agrees with a promise made by Mansoor to kill Jayaseelan. Rukmani, the head's daughter, becomes the bride, and Sulthan falls in love with her. The gang secretly follows Jayaseelan, planning to kill him, but their attempts are unsuccessful. The village tahsildar reveals that Jayaseelan is after the iron in a mountain, and the only way to stop him is to prove their lands are fertile and that crops can grow on the land.

Rukmani reprimands Sulthan, and Sulthan stops an attempt by Mansoor and the gang to kill Jayaseelan. An angered Sulthan severely beats up Jayaseelan and his men. Meanwhile, the police force starts a sting operation to kill all goons in the city to attain peace. Sulthan learns about the news and extends their stay in the village for five months, practising agriculture day and night. A corporate businessman, John Dhar, arrives and asks Sulthan to buy the mountain, but Sulthan refuses. Enraged, John Dhar sends goons to kill Sulthan, but Sulthan beats them all. Michael, a gang member, becomes bitter towards Sulthan after Sulthan beat him up after he fought with a man who sexually assaulted a woman.

Plants eventually grow on their land, rewarding the gang's hard work. John Dhar grows enraged, but Amith Raj, a part of the Ministry of Mines, postpones the inspection so that John can prove the lands are barren. Rukmani reciprocates Sulthan's feelings and accepts the marriage proposal. Sulthan and Rukmani get engaged in front of the villagers and the gang grandly. Sulthan buys two acres of land for the gang by selling his house and spending his savings. That night on the bus, John Dhar's goons fatally stab Mansoor, but Sulthan beats them. Mansoor dies due to his injuries. The gang prepares to kill the businessman, but Sulthan stops them. Michael challenges Sulthan to a fight, but Sulthan overpowers him, leading to the gang loathing him.

The gang leaves Sulthan and the village, making him devastated, and John Dhar plans to burn the town. Jayaseelan calls Sulthan and tells him he brought people to kill Sulthan and the villagers. Sulthan decides to protect the village from Jayaseelan and John Dhar. He evacuates the villagers, but he stays back to protect the town. The businessman and his men arrive at night and burn the crops, but Sulthan, his guard, Gada, and a few farmers kill many of John Dhar's henchmen, but Sulthan gets injured. Sulthan beats up and kills John Dhar and his men. Jayaseelan and his men arrive with a kidnapped Rukmani, but the gang arrives when they learn about Sulthan's sacrifices to protect them, and Michael apologises to Sulthan. They reconcile with Sulthan, and they kill Jayaseelan and his men. The gang begins working again in agriculture while Sulthan and Rukmani watch on.

== Cast ==
- Karthi as Sulthan
- Rashmika Mandanna as Rukmani
- Ramachandra Raju as Jayaseelan
- Napoleon as Sethupathi, Sulthan's father
- Lal as Mansoor, Sulthan's uncle
- Abhirami as Annalakshmi, Sulthan's mother and Mansoor younger sister(Cameo appearance)
- Nawab Shah as John Dhar, The Coprative business man
- Giant Zanjeer as Gada, Sulthan's bodyguard
- Ponvannan as Rukmani's father (Village head)
- Yogi Babu as Otta Lorry
- Sathish as Shakthi, Sulthan's friend
- Pykara Kaalayan as Samarasam
- Hareesh Peradi as Police Commissioner Manickavel
- M. S. Bhaskar as Advocate Muthusaamy
- Arjai as Thalaya
- Singampuli as Villager
- Mayilsamy as Villager
- Nagineedu as Amrith Raj, Ministry of Mines
- Sendrayan as Mansoor's goon
- Sharat Kumar as Mansoor's goon
- G. Marimuthu as Villager (negative talker)
- Rama as Villager
- Sharath Ravi as Chittu Kuruvi, Kaveri's son, Mansoor's goon
- Senthi Kumari as Kaveri, Goon's mother
- M. Kamaraj as Michael
- Sangeetha V as Rukmani's relative
- Raja Rani Pandian as Police (cameo appearance)
- Prabhu as Karikaalan, Mansoor's goon
- Namo Narayana as Tehsildar

== Production ==
=== Development ===
In October 2017, it was reported that Karthi would star in a film to be directed by Bakkiyaraj Kannan and produced by S. R. Prabhu, one of the producers from Dream Warrior Pictures. It was also reported that the film would enter production in February or March 2019. In the same month, it was reported that Rashmika Mandanna or Raashii Khanna will play the female lead; with Rashmika being signed in for the project in February 2019, making her debut in Tamil cinema.

In May 2019, sources reported that the film will be titled as Sulthan, although an official confirmation was not revealed from the producers. However, in August 2019, Rashmika accidentally revealed the title of the film without the consent of the filmmakers, and later apologised to the makers and the rest of the team. The title Sulthan was previously associated with the shelved animated film, Sultan: The Warrior, which was to star Rajinikanth.

=== Filming ===
The project was officially launched on 13 March 2019, at the office of Dream Warrior Pictures, with the attendance of the film's cast and crew. After a brief shoot of the film being completed, a source claimed that the makers planned to shoot the film within a single schedule, with sets being erected in Chennai. The team successfully completed the first schedule in June 2019, and the makers planned for a second schedule of the film on 28 June 2019, with Karthi joining the sets on 10 July, post the completion of Thambi (2019). However, Rashmika revealed that the film's shoot is postponed to August, for unknown reasons, although Karthi resumed the shooting of the film on 7 August 2019.

On 24 September 2019, Hindutva outfits disrupted the film's shoot at Malaikkottai in Dindigul on 24 September 2019. The protesters belonging to the Bharatiya Janata Party (BJP), Hindu Munnani and the Hindu Makkal Katchi objected to the title Sulthan, assuming the film was a biopic of the 18th century ruler Tipu Sultan, and said that he had attacked Tamils during his rule. Later, Prabhu revealed that the film is not based on history. Due to the COVID-19 pandemic in India, the film's last leg shoot along with post-production works came to a halt. With the state government imposed guidelines, to resume the film shooting, the makers started the final leg of the shoot on 25 September 2020 at Chennai, instead of Dindigul. Filming wrapped on 8 October 2020.

== Music ==
Sulthan

Soundtrack album by Vivek–Mervin
- Released: 24 March 2021
- Genre: Feature film soundtrack
- Length: 13:37
- Language: Tamil
- Label: Dream Warrior Pictures
- Producer: Vivek–Mervin

Vivek–Mervin chronology
Dharala Prabhu (2020)	Sulthan (2021)	Enna Solla Pogirai (2022)

The film score is composed by Yuvan Shankar Raja while the songs are composed by Vivek–Mervin. The lyrics were written by Viveka and Thanikodi. The first single track titled "Jai Sulthan" was released on 11 February 2021, which was sung by Anirudh, Junior Nithya and Gana Guna. The second single "Yaaraiyum Ivalo Azhaga" was sung by Silambarasan, with lyrics written by Viveka which released on 5 March 2021. The third single "Eppadi Iruntha Naanga", sung by Anthony Daasan, Mahalingam and Vivek Siva was released on 15 March 2021.

Initially Vivek and Mervin were reported to handle the film's background score. However, Bakkiyaraj opted Yuvan Shankar Raja to score music for the background and also credited in the film's trailer. It was noted that Vivek and Mervin had worked in the score for the film's teaser.

Track listing
No.	Title	Lyrics	Singer(s)	Length
1.	"Jai Sulthan"	Viveka	Anirudh Ravichander, Junior Nithya, Gana Guna	4:06
2.	"Eppadi Iruntha Naanga"	Viveka	Anthony Daasan, Mahalingam, Vivek Siva	4:58
3.	"Yaaraiyum Ivlo Azhaga"	Viveka	Silambarasan, Mervin Solomon	4:31
4.	"Pudhu Saththam"	Thanikodi	Kailash Kher, Vivek Siva, Sameera Bharadwaj	4:56
Total length:				18:31

== Release ==
=== Theatrical ===
In February 2021, the release date of the film was announced as 2 April 2021. The following month, S. R. Prabhu said the film would release as planned, despite rumours that it may be postponed due to the Tamil Nadu Legislative Assembly elections as well as the rise in COVID-19 cases across Tamil Nadu.

=== Home media ===
The film began streaming on Disney+ Hotstar from 2 May 2021.

== Reception ==
=== Critical response ===
Manoj Kumar R of The Indian Express rated the film 4 stars of 5 and praised high production values and emotional content. "Director Bakkiyaraj Kannan’s solidity expands on the belief that men are naturally good," he wrote. Srinivasa Ramanujam in his review for The Hindu called the it "engaging commercial film that combines two popular Tamil cinema's ideas: rowdyism and farming."

Firstpost critic Ranjani Krishnakumar opined that the film "suffers from confused messaging with a dash of masala." Haricharan Pudipeddi of Hindustan Times compared Sulthan with other films with similar plotlines such as Sarkar, Maharshi and Thevar Magan. Pudipeddi stated that "In spite of borrowing from quite a few films, Sulthan still manages to engage and entertain, making it a highly predictable but fun action drama." Baradwaj Rangan wrote for Film Companion, "The writer-director doesn't trust his premise. He wants to keep throwing in more, more, more."

=== Box office ===
The film grossed over Rs 12 crores during the first two days of its worldwide release, and 20 crore on the third.
