= Karana (dance) =

Transitions in classical Indian dance

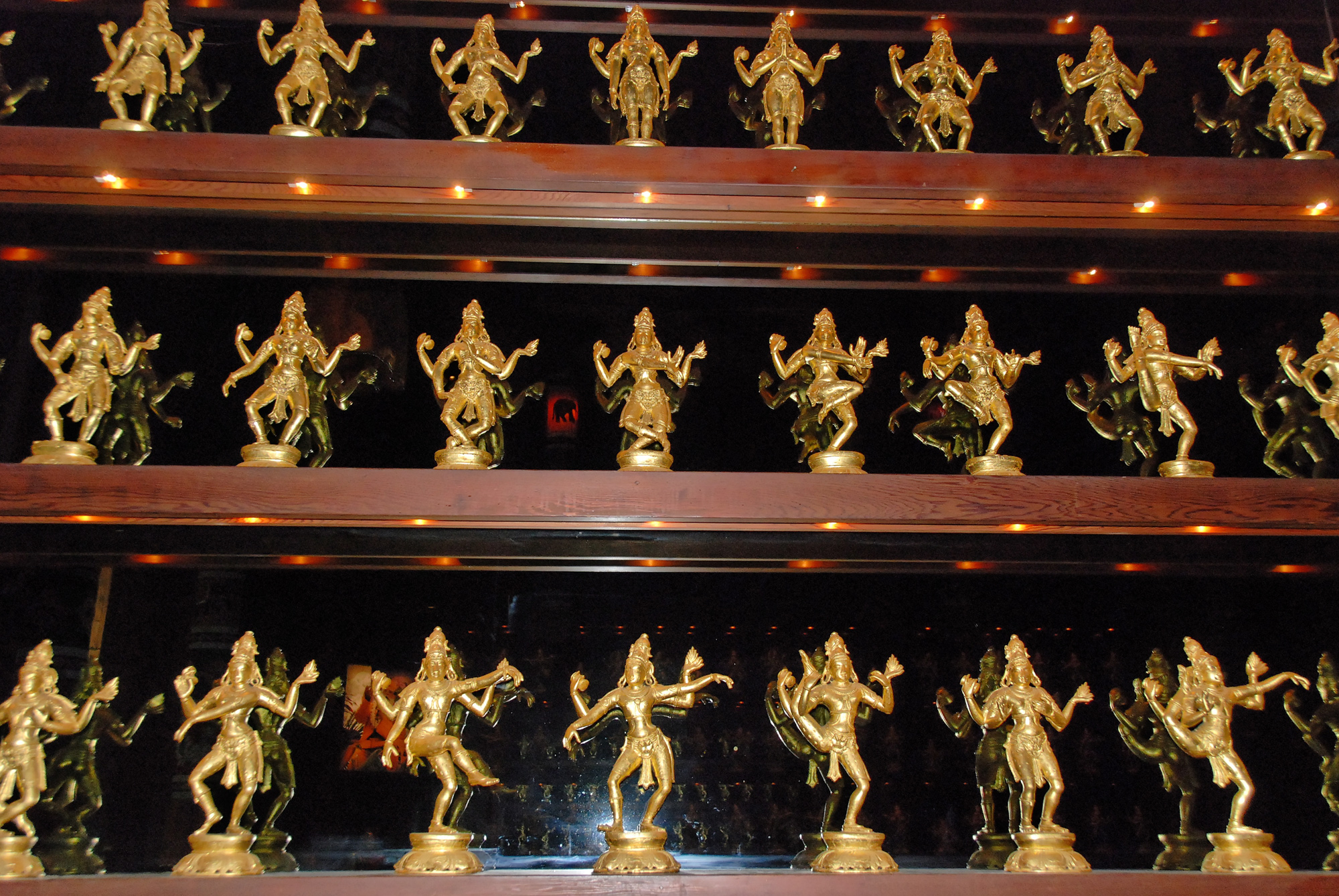
Sculptures of the Karanas performed by the god of dance - Nataraja - at Kadavul Hindu Temple, on Kauai, Hawaii.

Karanas are the 108 key transitions in the classical Indian dance described in 4th Chapter named "Tandava Lakshana" of Natya Shastra. Karana is a Sanskrit verbal noun, meaning "doing".

== Description ==
Natya Shastra states that Karanas are the framework for the "margi" (pan-Indian classical) productions which are supposed to spiritually enlighten the spectators, as opposed to the "desi" (regional folk or pop dance) productions which can only entertain the spectators. "One who performs well this Karana dance created by Maheswara will go free from all sins to the abode of this deity," states Natya Shastra

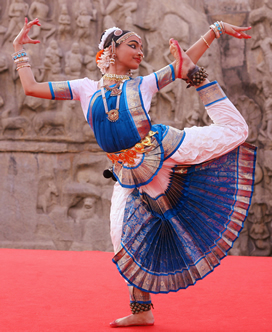
A variant of Vrscikakuttitam karana

Some of the well-known interpretations of karanas are by Padma Subramanyam that were based on 108 brief movement phrases describing specific leg, hip, body, and arm movements accompanied by hasta mudras described in the Natya shastra and other scriptures, and from depictions of the movements in sculpture in five South Indian temples, notably the Chidambaram temple which contains depictions of the full set. Padma Subrahmanyam has written a book called Karanas-Common dance codes of India and Indonesia, based on her research of karanas from the temples of Prambanan(Indonesia), Thanjavur, Kumbakonam, Chidambaram, Thiruvannamalai, and Vriddhachalam. In the 20th century, she was the first dancer to reconstruct the Karanas as movements, which were considered mere poses earlier.

Some other Bharatanatyam gurus, such as Adyar Lakshman (Kalakshetra school), as well as the Kuchipudi gurus Vempati Chinna Satyam and C.R.Acharya have also attempted to reconstruct all the 108 karanas, which were often significantly different from Padma Subrahmanyam's interpretations so much so that even on the chari (leg movement) level there was no agreement as to whose interpretation is correct. Due to the significant variations in the depictions, most traditional Bharatanatyam schools considered Padma Subrahmanyam's style, which incorporated Karanas as incorrect, which forced her to name her own style as Bharatanrityam rather than Bharatanatyam. Many of Padma Subrahmanyam's disciples, such as Bala Devi Chandrashekar (SPNAPA Academy of performing arts) - Sujatha Mohan (Padmashree Nrithyalaya), Uma Sriram, Jayashree Rajagopalan, Dominique Delorme (France) and others are teaching the 108 karanas based on Subramanyam's research.

There used to be devadasis who performed all the 108 karanas. Still, now in most contemporary Bharatanatyam or Odissi schools, only a small number of karanas and their derivatives have been transmitted by parampara up to date.

Apart from that, performing of the same Karana differs greatly across different classical Indian styles. Currently, as regards the exact technique, there are no established standards and no universally agreed-upon interpretations of the texts and sculptures.

== List of 108 Karanas ==
1. Talapuṣpapuṭam
2. Vartitam
3. Valitōrukam
4. Apaviddham
5. Samanakham
6. Līnam
7. Swastikarēchitam
8. Manḍalaswastikam
9. Nikuṭṭakam
10. Ardhanikuṭṭam
11. Kaṭīchinnam
12. Ardharēchitam
13. Vakśaswastikam
14. Unmattam
15. Swastikam
16. Pṛṣṭhaswastikam
17. Dikswastikam
18. Alātam
19. Kaṭīsamam
20. Ākśiptarēchitam
21. Vikśiptākśiptam
22. Ardhaswastikam
23. Añchitam
24. Bhujaṅgatrāsitam
25. Ūrdhvajānu
26. Nikuñchitam
27. Mattalli
28. Ardhamattalli
29. Rēchitanikuṭṭam
30. Pādāpaviddakam
31. Valitam
32. Gūrṇitam
33. Lalitam
34. Daṇḍapakśam
35. Bhujaṅgatrastarēchitam
36. Nūpuram
37. Vaiṣākharēchitam
38. Bhramaram
39. Chaturam
40. Bhujaṅgāñchitam
41. Daṇḍarēchitam
42. Vṛśchikakuṭṭitam
43. Kaṭībhrāntam
44. Latāvṛśchikam
45. Chinnam
46. Vṛśchikarēchitam
47. Vṛśchikam
48. Vyamsitam
49. Pārśvanikuṭṭakam
50. Lalāṭatilakam
51. Krāntam
52. Kuñchitam
53. Chakramaṇḍalam
54. Urōmaṇḍalam
55. Ākśiptam
56. Talavilāsitam
57. Argaḷam
58. Vikṣiptam
59. Āvartam
60. Dōlāpādam
61. Vivṛttam
62. Vinivṛttam
63. Pārśvakrāntam
64. Niṣumbhitam
65. Vidyutbhrāntam
66. Atikrāntam
67. Vivartitakam
68. Gajakrīḍitam
69. Talasamsphoṭitam
70. Garuḍaplutam
71. Gaṇḍasūchī
72. Parīvṛttam
73. Pārśvajānu
74. Gṛdrāvalīnakam
75. Sannatam
76. Sūchī
77. Ardhasūchī
78. Sūchīviddham
79. Apakrāntam
80. Mayūralalitam
81. Sarpitam
82. Danḍapādam
83. Harinaplutam
84. Prēnkōlitam
85. Nitambam
86. Skalitam
87. Karihastam
88. Prasarpitam
89. Simhavikrīḍitam
90. Simhākarṣitam
91. Udvṛttam
92. Upaśṛtam
93. Talasaṅghaṭṭitam
94. Janitam
95. Avahittakam
96. Nivēśam
97. Ēlakākrīditam
98. Ūrūdvṛttam
99. Madaskalitam
100. Viṣṇukrāntam
101. Sambhrāntam
102. Viśkhambam
103. Udghaṭṭitam
104. Vṛśabhakrīḍitam
105. Lōlitam
106. Nāgāpasarpitam
107. Śakaṭāsyam
108. Gaṅgāvataranam

== See also ==
- Kuchipudi
