= S. Krishnaswamy =

Indian documentary filmmaker (1938–2025)

- Born: Subramanyam Krishnaswamy; 29 July 1938; Madras, Madras Province, British India
- Died: 28 December 2025 (aged 87); Chennai, Tamil Nadu, India
- Occupations: Filmmaker; author
- Spouse: Mohana Krishnaswamy (1969–2025)
- Children: 3
- Father: Krishnaswami Subrahmanyam
- Relatives: Padma Subrahmanyam (sister); Raghuram (nephew); Hrishikesh (grand-nephew); Anirudh Ravichander (grand-nephew); Gayathri Raghuram (grand-niece)

Subramanyam Krishnaswamy (29 July 1938 – 28 December 2025) was an Indian documentary filmmaker and writer who won the Padma Shri award in 2009. His later works included three documentaries on the Indian influence in Southeast Asia: Indian Imprints, A Different Pilgrimage, and Tracking Indian Footmarks. Indian Imprints was broadcast on Doordarshan in 18 episodes.

Krishnaswamy died from heart disease on 29 December 2025 at a hospital in Chennai. He was aged 87.

== Books ==
- Indian Film (with Erik Barnouw) (Columbia University Press 1963, Oxford University Press 1980)

== Awards ==
- 2009: Padma Shri
- 2009: Hamsadhwani Distinguished Citizen of the Year Award
