= Bommala Koluvu (film) =

- Theatrical release poster
- Directed by: Subbu Vedula
- Produced by: A. V. R. Swamy M. S. C. (A.G.)
- Starring: Hrishikesh; Priyanka Sharma; Malavika Satheesan; Subbu Vedula; Shivam Malhotra
- Cinematography: Ishwar
- Edited by: M. R. Varmaa
- Music by: Pravin Lakkaraju
- Production companies: Pruthvi Creations; Kickass Storytellers
- Release date: 22 April 2022
- Running time: 128 minutes
- Country: India
- Language: Telugu

Bommala Koluvu (transl. Court of toys) is a 2022 Indian Telugu-language action thriller film directed by Subbu Vedula of Raahu fame and starring himself, Hrishikesh in his Telugu debut, Priyanka Sharma, Malavika Satheesan and Shivam Malhotra. The film was released to negative reviews with the music considered as the film's saving grace.

== Cast ==
- Hrishikesh as Rudra
- Priyanka Sharma as Mithila
- Malavika Satheesan as Raaga
- Subbu Vedula as Irfan
- Shivam Malhotra as Guna Shekhar
- Ravi Mariya as Gangi Reddy

== Soundtrack ==
The music was composed by Pravin Lakkaraju.

Track listing
No.	Title	Lyrics	Singer(s)	Length
1.	"Mudhiche Na Sukumari"	Srinivasa Mouli	Anirudh Ravichander	2:55
2.	"Modhalavudham Modhalavudham"	Parimala Srinivasa Mouli Patri	Pravin Lakkaraju	2:19
3.	"I Know What You Want"	Zeeshaan Wasim Hakeem	Zeeshaan Wasim Hakeem	2:17
Total length:				7:31

== Reception ==
A critic from The Times of India Samayam rated the film two-and-a-half out of five stars and wrote that "The brand new storyline..[is] an unimpressive one". A critic from NTV wrote that "There are many such crime thrillers in Telugu. But weaving a story based on Corona has novelty. Also, turning people into mannequins into cloth showrooms and selling them to auction to foreigners is somewhat different But none of these are things that thrill the audience".
