= Bakkiyaraj Kannan =

Indian film director (born 1987)

- Born: 2 April 1987 (age 39); Vellore, Tamil Nadu, India
- Education: DFTech(MGR FTIT) BSc(SRM)
- Occupation: Filmmaker
- Years active: 2016–present
- Spouse: Asha (m. 2020) Asha Bhakiyaraj Kanna

Bakkiyaraj Kannan (born 2 April 1987) is an Indian film director who works in Tamil film industry. He has directed two films: Remo (2016) and Sulthan (2021).

== Personal life ==
Bakkiyaraj Kannan was named after the actor and filmmaker K. Bhagyaraj. He married Asha in October 2020.

== Career ==
When studying S.R.M. College & MGR Movie Television Institute Kannan forayed into films. He began working as an associate director to Sundar C and Atlee for Kalakalappu (2012) and Raja Rani (2013).

He made his directional debut with Remo (2016). The film stars Sivakarthikeyan and Keerthy Suresh. Which was an commercial success at the box-office. He earned a nomination for the Best Tamil Debut Director at the 6th South Indian International Movie Awards. He also has won Edison Awards for Best Debut Director, for the film.

Kannan's next film as a director was Sulthan (2021). The film stars Karthi and Rashmika Mandanna. The film opened to mixed to positive reviews, but was a decent hit at the box-office due to the closure of theatres because of COVID 19 pandemi.<.

On 14 April 2024, it was announced that Kannan would be directing his next film under Lokesh Kanagaraj's banner, G Squad. Titled Benz, it will star Raghava Lawrence in the lead role. On 30 October 2024, it was confirmed that Benz would be a part of the Lokesh Cinematic Universe.

== Filmography ==
=== Films ===
Year	Film	Notes	Ref
2016	Remo	Debut as director; also special appearance in the song "Tamilselvi"	
2021	Sulthan		
2027	Benz †	Story by Lokesh Kanagaraj and part of the LCU	

== Awards and nominations ==
Year	Film	Award	Category	Result
2016	Remo	6th South Indian International Movie Awards	Best Debut Director	Nominated
2016	Remo	Edison Awards	Best Debut Director	Won
