= Bala Devi Chandrashekar =

American dancer

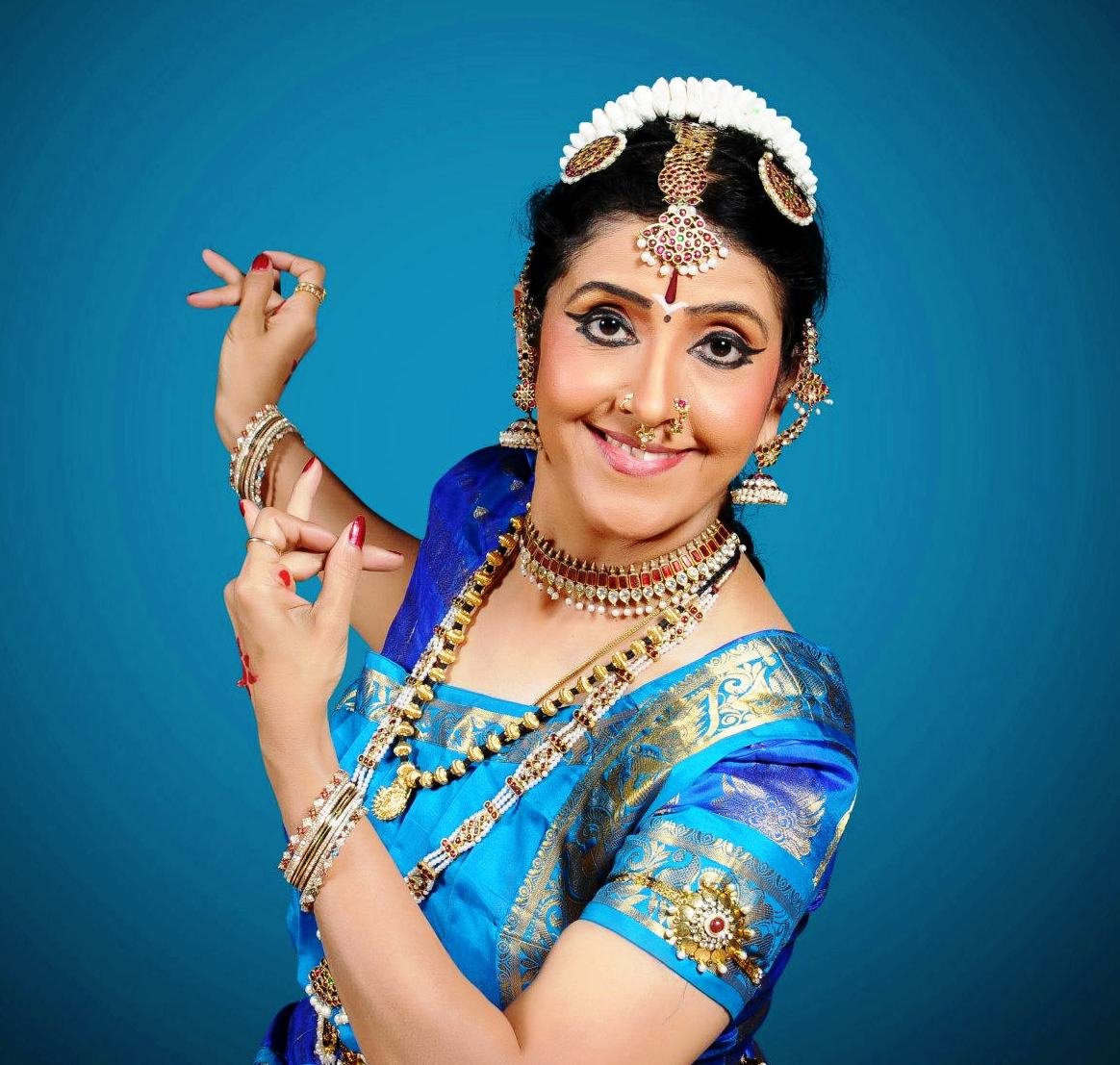
- Bala Devi in 2010
- Occupations: dancer, choreographer, teacher
- Known for: Bharatanatyam

Bala Devi Chandrashekar is an American dancer specialized in the Indian classical dance form Bharatanatyam.

== Career ==
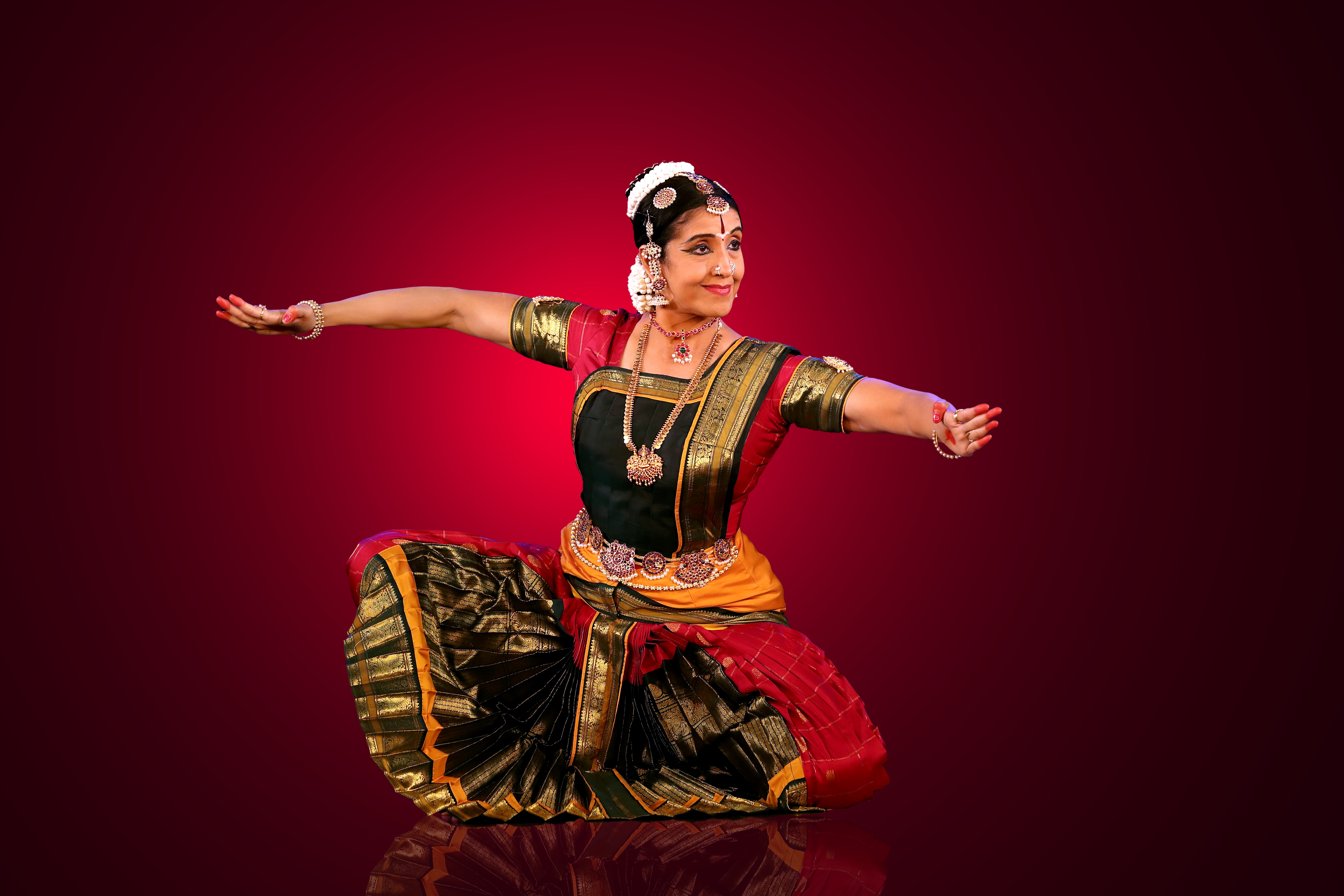
Bala Devi in 2022

Bala Devi worked in public administration and as a management consultant but later became a full-time dancer.

She has studied Bharatanatyam under Padma Subrahmanyam and performs using the style of Padma's school. She dances in the Vazhuvur style. Bala Devi has choreographed Bharatanatyam performances and performed for the Madras Music Season. She has performed with music by Pyotr Ilyich Tchaikovsky.

Bala Devi has been artist-in-residence at the Carl A. Fields Center, Princeton University. She has taught Princeton students.

Bala Devi was awarded the Kalaimamani for Bharatanatyam in 2012.

She teaches at Shree Padma Nrityam Academy, New Jersey.

Bala Devi is based in Princeton, New Jersey, is married to Chandrashekar and has two sons.

== Productions ==
She has choreographed and performed over ten thematic Bharatanatyam productions integrating classical dance with history, temple architecture, Sanskrit literature, devotional traditions and Carnatic music. Her productions have been presented at UNESCO Headquarters in Paris, Symphony Space in New York City and major cultural institutions across India, Europe and North America..

Bala Devi Chandrashekar’s notable productions include:

- Mauli – A Timeless Tradition (2025–present), a full-length Bharatanatyam dance production based on the 800-year-old Varkari devotional tradition of Maharashtra. The production explores the lives and poetry of saints including Dnyaneshwar, Namdev, Janabai, Chokhamela, Eknath and Tukaram through Bharatanatyam. It was presented at Symphony Space in New York City in June 2026 following performances in India.
- Padmavati – An Avatar (2023), staged at Symphony Space, New York, described as “a captivating operatic Bharatanatyam production” based on Jayadeva’s poetry.
- Brihadeeswara – Form to Formless (2019), presented at UNESCO Headquarters in Paris during World Heritage Week, focusing on the architectural and spiritual dimensions of the Thanjavur temple.
- Karna: Destiny’s Child (2019), performed at the Attikon Theatre in Cyprus, exploring the Mahabharata character Karna through Bharatanatyam.
- Maa – The Eternal Truth (2023), premiered at R.K. Swamy Hall, Mylapore, Chennai, as an operatic production on motherhood and nature, later reviewed in the Indian press.
- Uddhava Gita: Lord Krishna’s Last Message, a dance production centered on the final teachings of Krishna.
- Tripura – Divine Feminine, dedicated to the goddess Tripura and the concept of Shakti.
- FujiHima – Eternal Peaks, juxtaposing Indian philosophy with the symbolism of Mount Fuji and the Himalayas.

Her repertoire also includes productions such as MLV Favorites and Krishnaarpanam, along with dance workshops and films documented in international archives.

== Lecture-demonstrations and scholarship ==
Chandrashekar has presented lecture-demonstrations on Bharatanatyam, the Natya Shastra, Indian temple sculpture and aesthetics at universities and cultural institutions in India and abroad. In July 2026, she presented Exploring the Sculptural Repertoire, Karanas, and Rasa Sutra of the Natya Shastra at the National Centre for the Performing Arts (NCPA), Mumbai. The presentation, based on her production Mauli – A Timeless Tradition, examined the relationship between Bharatanatyam, Indian temple sculpture and the aesthetic principles of the Natya Shastra.

== Critical reception and media coverage ==
Chandrashekar's work as a Bharatanatyam performer, choreographer and scholar has received sustained coverage in the Indian press, particularly for her research-based thematic productions and her integration of classical texts, philosophy, temple traditions and dance. The Hindu has reviewed several of her works over the years, including productions dealing with devotional literature, the Natya Shastra, temple sculpture and philosophical themes.

Her approach to taking themes rooted in Indian philosophy and classical literature to international audiences has also been the subject of profiles and reviews. Deccan Chronicle profiled Chandrashekar in connection with her production on Karna and her approach to presenting Indian classical dance internationally. The Hindu subsequently examined this aspect of her work in Local themes, global appeal and reviewed her performance in Well-sculpted performance.

Her production Padmavati – An Avatar, drawing upon Jayadeva's Gita Govinda and the story of Padmavati, was featured by The Hindu in 2023. The newspaper has also covered Chandrashekar's work as a teacher, including the establishment of her dance academy in Kochi.

In 2025, The Times of India profiled Chandrashekar during the Chennai Margazhi season, discussing Chennai's classical arts audiences, international interest in Bharatanatyam, research in classical dance and approaches to teaching the art form.

Amrapali Magazine later profiled Chandrashekar's career as a performer, choreographer, researcher and educator, including her international performances, thematic productions, academic activities and her concept of "Artistic Intelligence".

== Arts and social initiatives ==
Chandrashekar has used Bharatanatyam performances to support educational and social causes in India and the United States. Her artistic projects have included performances associated with fundraising and community initiatives, alongside productions addressing themes of social responsibility.

In July 2026, Chandrashekar collaborated with FUEL (Friends Union for Energising Lives) Education Institution in Pune for a presentation of Mauli – A Timeless Tradition, linking the performance with an initiative supporting girls' education and women's empowerment. The programme sought to raise funds through corporate social responsibility (CSR) initiatives for the education of ten underprivileged girl students.

For the initiative, Chandrashekar travelled from the United States to India to support FUEL Education's work in women's empowerment and did not accept an honorarium for the performance. She described artists as having a responsibility to give back to the community from which they receive inspiration and support.

== See also ==
- Indians in the New York City metropolitan area
