= San Remo =

San Remo may refer to:

== Places ==
- Sanremo, a city in Liguria, Italy
- San Remo, New South Wales, a town in New South Wales, Australia
- San Remo, Victoria, a town in Victoria, Australia
- San Remo, Western Australia, a suburb of Mandurah, Australia
- San Remo, New York, a hamlet in Suffolk County, New York, USA

== Other uses ==
- Romulus of Genoa (Saint Romulus), bishop of Genoa after whom the town of Sanremo was named
- The San Remo, an apartment building in New York City
- Hôtel San Rémo, former name of Oyo Hotel & Casino, Las Vegas
- San Remo conference, 1920 peace conference in Sanremo, Italy
- Sanremo Music Festival, held annually in Sanremo, Italy
- Rallye Sanremo, a rally competition held in Sanremo, Italy
- San Remo (company), an Australian pasta company
- San Remo Manual, short name for San Remo Manual on International Law Applicable to Armed Conflicts at Sea, a manual on naval warfare (1994)
- San Remo Golden Strings, 1960s Detroit soul orchestra
- San Remo, a fictional city in the TV series Petrocelli
