= Jeanette Solstad Remø =

Norwegian transgender rights activist

Jeanette Solstad Remø is a Norwegian transgender woman human rights defender.

== Early life ==
Jeanette Solstad Remø was born in the 1950s. Remø left home at 17 and married in her early twenties. She and her wife had a son. Remø later enlisted in the Navy and became a Captain at 27.

== Activism ==
Remø joined the Norwegian Association for Transgender people (FTP-N) in 1986. She came out as a transgender woman in 2010. At the time, she was able to change her legal name but not her legal gender. From the 1970s until 2015, transgender people in Norway were able to obtain legal recognition of their gender on the basis of compulsory treatments, including gender affirming surgery and removal of reproductive organs, resulting in irreversible sterilization. Trans people seeking legal gender recognition were required to obtain a psychiatric diagnosis stating that they suffer from a mental disorder. Remø rejected these terms. As a result, she could not obtain identity papers that recognised her identity as a woman.

As an activist, Remø used the name "John Jeanette" to highlight the discrimination Norwegian transgender people faced in accessing legal gender recognition. She actively campaigned for an end to the policy. In 2014, her personal story was included in Amnesty International's "Write for Rights" campaign, and she was supported by thousands worldwide.

== Policy change ==
On 10 April 2015, the Norwegian Ministry of Health’s Expert Committee on legal gender recognition presented its recommendations and recommended the policy be amended. On 6 June 2016, the Norwegian Parliament approved a new law regulating gender recognition based on self-determination, which came into force on 1 July 2016. The law removed all requirements for psychiatric diagnosis, medical interventions including surgeries and sterilization; this process is accessible to all above age 16 and with consent from at least one parent for people aged 6 to 15.
