= Remo (soundtrack) =

2016 soundtrack album by Anirudh Ravichander

- Soundtrack album cover

Soundtrack album by Anirudh Ravichander
- Released: 5 September 2016
- Recorded: 2015–2016
- Studio: Albuquerque Records, Chennai; AM Studios, Chennai
- Genre: Feature film soundtrack
- Length: 28:12
- Language: Tamil
- Label: Sony Music India
- Producer: Anirudh Ravichander

Anirudh Ravichander chronology
Thanga Magan (2015)	Remo (2016)	Rum (2016)

Singles from Remo
- 1. "Remo Nee Kadhalan" Released: 23 June 2016; 2. "Senjitaley" Released: 1 July 2016; 3. "Sirikkadhey" Released: 18 August 2016; 4. "Come Closer (Sirikkadhey Reprise)" Released: 26 August 2016; 5. "Veshangalil Poiyillai (Additional Song)" Released: 16 October 2016

Remo is the soundtrack album composed by Anirudh Ravichander, for the 2016 Indian Tamil-language romantic comedy film of the same name, starring Sivakarthikeyan. The album also consists of the background score and additional songs. It received a major positive reception, greatly contributing to the financial success of the namesake movie.

== Development ==
Anirudh Ravichander composed the soundtrack album and background score for Remo in which he collaborates with Sivakarthikeyan for the fourth time after Ethir Neechal (2013), Maan Karate (2014) and Kaaki Sattai (2015). He joined as the film's composer in June 2015. The album consists of seven songs with one bonus track and lyrics were written by Vignesh Shivan, Vivek, Ku. Karthik, Inno Genga and L. H. Harish Raam. The audio rights were acquired by Sony Music India. In June 2016, it was reported that Marana Gana Viji had recorded one of the songs for the film, but was not included in the final album. Later that month, Bollywood singer Arjun Kanungo made his debut in Tamil film music scene, recording the duet song "Sirikkadhey" with Srinidhi Venkatesh. Kanungo said that as he was unfamiliar with the language, Anirudh had patiently taught him the meaning of the song, so he could understand the lyrics. Composer Santhosh Narayanan, also crooned one song "Daavuya" for the film.

== Marketing and release ==
The first single from the album, titled "Remo Nee Kadhalan" was initially supposed to be released on 9 June 2016, but the song was released 23 June at the film's first look and motion poster release event, which was telecasted live on the official YouTube channel of Sony Music South, and Anirudh gave a live stage performance of the song. The second single "Senjitaley" was launched on 1 July 2016, which performed by Anirudh Ravichander at the 5th South Indian International Movie Awards, held at the Suntec Convention and Exhibition Centre in Singapore, and was launched by actor Vikram.

The third single "Sirikkadhey" was launched as a promotional music video on 18 August 2016. The promo was directed by Prabhu Radhakrishnan and filmed by Swaroop Philip, featuring the music composer Anirudh, singers Arjun Kanungo and Srinidhi Venkatesh and music technicians, along with the lead pair. Another single, "Come Closer" was released on 26 August 2016, which was written and rendered by Inno Genga. The song was a reprised international version of "Sirikkadhey" and was also premiered on MTV India, conjunctively with its launch.

The entire album was launched on 5 September 2016, by composer A. R. Rahman, and it was made available to download on the internet. Post-release, an additional song "Veshangalil Poiyillai" written by L. H. Harish Raam and composed and sang by Anirudh was released on 16 October 2016, coinciding with his birthday.

== Reception ==
The album received mostly positive reviews from critics. Top 10 Cinema rated that "Anirudh comes up with some energetic numbers, but in many places they sound so much stereotypical as his erstwhile numbers. Maybe for certain seasons, teen audiences would love his musical score, but he has to attempt trying with different genres". Richard Mahesh of Studioflicks rated the album 3 out of 5, and stated "Remo songs completely belong to the usual style of Anirudh as he ritually comes up with the tunes to savour the teen groups. But it would be nicer if he can redirect towards different musical genres rather than playing the same tunes to his fans, which might get time worn after some time." Karthik Srinivasan of Milliblog stated "Anirudh makes all the right moves in the music of Remo." A reviewer from The Times of India stated "The album has a young and trendy sound, and will come as a breath of fresh air."

S. Srivatsan of India Today wrote "Be it the songs or the thumping BGM, Anirudh Ravichander, who is collaborating with Sivakarthikeyan for the fourth time, delivers the adequate mass moments." Sreedhar Pillai of Firstpost wrote "Anirudh’s background score and music video style picturisation of the songs make it peppy." S. Saraswathi of Rediff.com called the music "stunning" with "most of the songs are already chartbusters". Nitya Punnackal of Onmanorama wrote: "Right from there, six songs have been stuffed into the movie. Listening to the songs 'Senjitaley' and 'Tamilselvi', one might wonder whether music director Anirudh Ravichander is yet to be freed from the Kolaveri fever as the lyrics by Vignesh Shivan play with the Tamil-English combo game again. But the love song, Sirikkathey, truly hits it off with its breezy rhythm. P.C. Sreeram and art director Muthuraj have done a commendable job as the song Sirikkathey turns out to be a delicious visual treat."

== Controversy ==
The song "Senjitaley" irked criticism for the glorification of stalking in the song. According to Sudhir Srinivasan, in an article on The Hindu, he stated about the lines from the song "Enakku nee easy-ah laam venaam[...]" which romanticises harassment. The News Minute summarised about this stating "The comments section on YouTube has discussions on the music and how good the song is but barely anything on how problematic it is."

== Track listing ==
The tracklist of the film was released in the form of an album preview on 1 September 2016, through the official YouTube channel of Sony Music India. The full soundtrack album was released directly through iTunes on 5 September 2016, without hosting any formal launch event.

Track list
No.	Title	Lyrics	Singer(s)	Length
1.	"Remo Nee Kadhalan"	Vignesh Shivan	Anirudh Ravichander	4:03
2.	"Senjitaley"	Vignesh Shivan	Anirudh Ravichander	4:11
3.	"Sirikkadhey"	Vignesh Shivan	Arjun Kanungo, Srinidhi Venkatesh	4:05
4.	"Meesa Beauty"	Vivek	Richard, Anirudh Ravichander	4:10
5.	"Daavuya"	Ku. Karthik	Santhosh Narayanan	4:27
6.	"Tamilselvi"	Vignesh Shivan	Nakash Aziz	3:50
7.	"Come Closer (Sirikkadhey Reprise)"	Inno Genga	Inno Genga	3:26
Total length:				28:12

== Background score ==
Remo Special (Original Background Score + Additional Song)

Film score by Anirudh Ravichander
- Released: 21 October 2016
- Recorded: 2015–2016
- Studio: Albuquerque Records, Chennai; AM Studios, Chennai
- Genre: Film score
- Length: 21:52
- Label: Sony Music
- Producer: Anirudh Ravichander

The original background score of the film was released on 21 October 2016, post-release of the film. It contains eighteen original scores, and a bonus track "Veshangalil Poyillai" which was written by Harish Raam L. H. and sung by Anirudh.

All music is composed by Anirudh Ravichander.

Remo Special (Original Background Score + Additional Song)
No.	Title	Length
1.	"First Sight"	1:39
2.	"SK's First Proposal"	1:13
3.	"A Broken Heart"	1:22
4.	"Lovestruck"	0:40
5.	"The Feeling of Love"	1:02
6.	"Saw Her Again"	1:07
7.	"Remo is a Magician"	0:39
8.	"Nurse Fight Theme"	1:43
9.	"Almost Won Her Love"	0:33
10.	"Happy Birthday"	2:04
11.	"SK Reveals Himself"	0:33
12.	"The Love Bug Has Bitten"	1:06
13.	"Following Her"	1:08
14.	"At the Saree Store"	1:05
15.	"Unexpected Sleepover"	0:56
16.	"The Bus Diaries"	1:30
17.	"Engagement Ring"	1:50
18.	"SK Fight Theme"	1:25
19.	"Veshangalil Poiyillai" (Bonus Track; Written by Harish Raam L. H. and sung by Anirudh Ravichander)	1:04
Total length:		22:40

== Accolades ==
Ceremony	Category	Nominee	Result
64th Filmfare Awards South	Best Music Director	Anirudh Ravichander	Nominated
64th Filmfare Awards South	Best Playback Singer (Male)	Anirudh Ravichander for "Senjitaley"	Nominated
6th South Indian International Movie Awards	Best Music Director	Anirudh Ravichander	Nominated
6th South Indian International Movie Awards	Best Male Playback Singer	Anirudh Ravichander for "Senjitaley"	Won
Edison Awards 2016	Best Music Director	Anirudh Ravichander	Won

== Album credits ==
=== Producer(s) ===
Anirudh Ravichander

=== Songwriter(s) ===
Anirudh Ravichander (Composer, Arranger)

Vignesh Shivan, Vivek, Ku. Karthik, Inno Genga, Harish Raam L. H. (Lyrics)

=== Performer(s) ===
Anirudh Ravichander, Arjun Kanungo, Srinidhi Venkatesh, Richard, Santhosh Narayanan, Nakash Aziz, Inno Genga, Ajesh Ashok, Ranjith

=== Musicians ===
- Guitars – Keba Jeremiah, Godfray Immanuel
- Tavil – Sundhar
- Tabla – M.T Aditya
- Mandolin & Banjo – Seenu
- Ganjeera – S. Swaminathan
- Flute – Kareem Kamalakar, Naveen Kumar
- Shehnai – Balesh
- Nadaswaram – D. Balasubramani
- Udukkai – Krishna Kishore
- Beatbox done by Hardee Bee (Malaysia)
- Additional Beat Box sampled from YouTube Chorus – Santhosh Hariharan, Nivas, Deepak Blue, Sai Charan, Shakthisree Gopalan, Nadisha Thomas, Kavitha Thomas, Sanjana Rajnarayan, Shenbagaraj, Maalavika, Veena Murali
- Piano Synth, Rhythm & Electronic Programming – Anirudh Ravichander
- Additional Rhythm – Shashank Vijay

=== Personnel ===
- Music Advisor – Ananthakrishnan
- Musician Coordinators – Samidurai, Velavan
- Modular Synths recorded at – Park Street Studios, Downtown, New York

=== Sound Engineers ===
- Albuquerque Records, Chennai - Srinivasan, Ananthakrishnan, Vinay Sridhar
- AM Studios, Chennai – S. Sivakumar, Pradeep Menon, Kannan Ganpat, Krishnan Subramaniyan, Manoj Raman, Aravind MS

=== Production ===
- Music Supervisor – Harish Raam L. H.
- Mixed By Vinay Sridhar
- Mastered by Shadab Rayeen @ New Edge Studios, Mumbai
- Mastered for iTunes by Vinay Sridhar
- Music Label – Sony Music India. Pvt. Ltd.
