= Padma Subrahmanyam =

Indian classical Bharata Natyam dancer

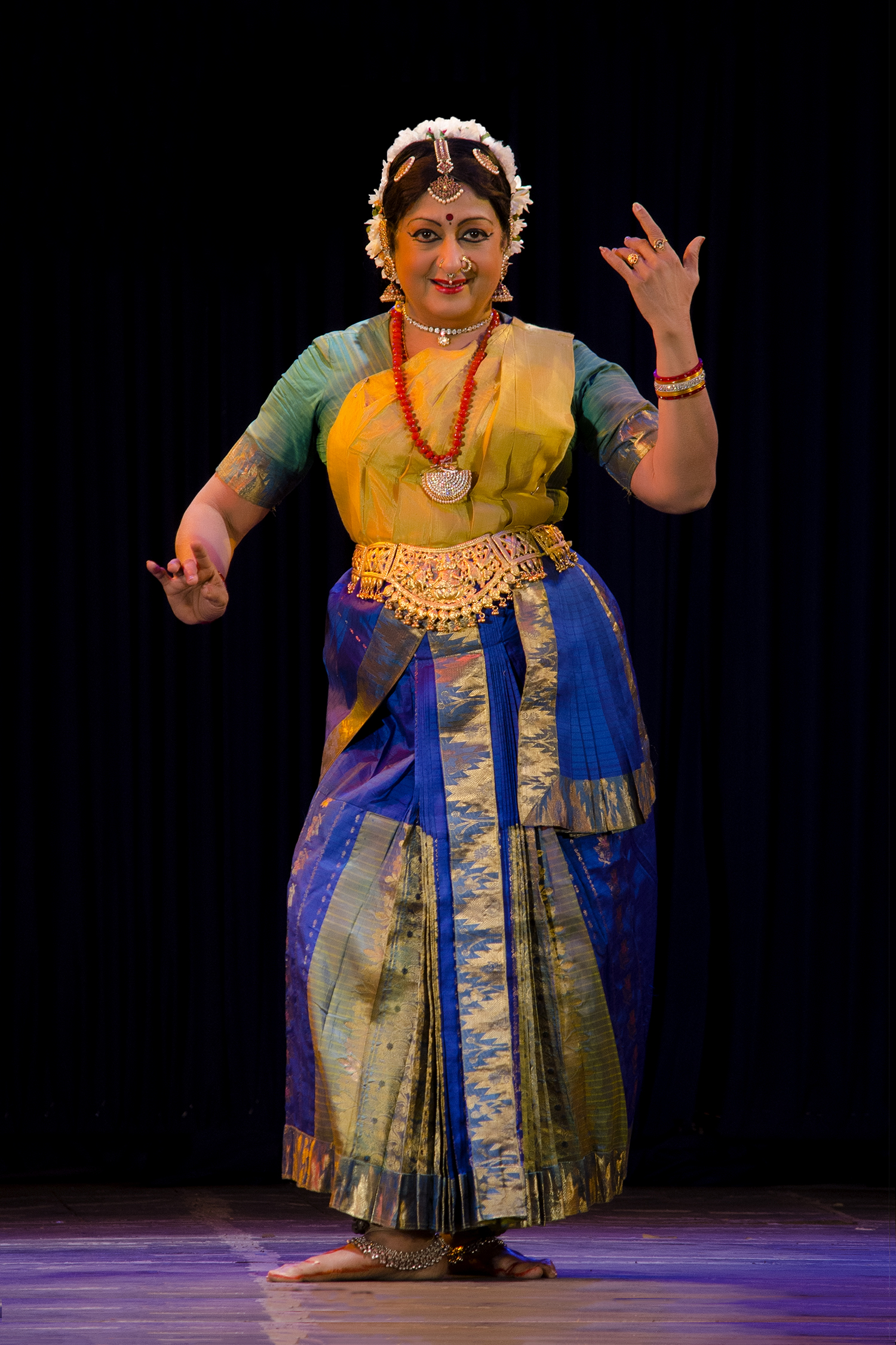
- Born: 4 February 1943 (age 83); Madras presidency, British India
- Education: Ethiraj College for Women
- Occupations: Dancer, Choreographer, Teacher and Author
- Known for: Bharatanatyam
- Father: Krishnaswami Subrahmanyam
- Relatives: S. Krishnaswamy (brother); Raghuram (nephew); Anirudh Ravichander (grand-nephew); Hrishikesh (grand-nephew); Gayathri Raghuram (grand-niece)
- Awards: Padma Shri (1981); Padma Bhushan (2003) Padma Vibhushan (2024)
- Website: padmadance.com

Padma Subrahmanyam (born 4 February 1943, in Madras) is an Indian classical Bharatanatyam dancer, research scholar, choreographer, teacher, Indologist and author. She is famous in India as well as abroad; several films and documentaries have been made in her honor by countries such as Japan, Australia and Russia. She is well known as the developer and founder of the dance form Bharata Nrithyam.

== Life and career ==
Padma Subrahmanyam was born to Krishnaswami Subrahmanyam, the Indian film director and Meenakshi Subrahmanyam on 4 February 1943 in Madras (now Chennai). Her father was a famous Indian filmmaker and her mother, Meenakshi was a music composer and a lyricist in Tamil and Sanskrit. She was trained by Vazhuvoor B. Ramaiyah Pillai. She started teaching dance at a very young age of 14 at her father's dance school. She felt that there was a gap between the history, theory and practice of dance and started doing her own research. She had her Arangetram in 1956.

She has taught children in Monfort Rukmani Devi, Maharaja Aagarsen and various other schools in the years 2009 to 2011. Padma holds a bachelor's degree in music, a master's degree in Ethnomusicology, as well as a PhD in Dance under the guidance of Kuthur Ramakrishnan Srinivasan, the noted archaeologist and a Padma Bhushan recipient. Her PhD was based on the reconstruction of the 108 karanas, which are dance movements described in the Natya Shastra. She has authored numerous articles, research papers and books and has served as a non-official member of the Indo-Sub-commission for education and culture. She has designed the 108 sculptures of Lord Nataraja and goddess Parvathi in black granite for the Nataraja temple at Satara, an undertaking she took at the bidding of the Kanchi Paramacharya. She has given lectures at various universities in southeast Asia, on the subject of cultural links between India and other countries.

== Disciples ==
Among Padma Subrahmanyam's disciples is Bala Devi Chandrashekar, a Bharatanatyam dancer, choreographer and educator based in Princeton, New Jersey. Chandrashekar trained under Subrahmanyam in Chennai and is the founder and artistic director of the Shree Padma Nrityam Academy of Performing Arts (SPNAPA).

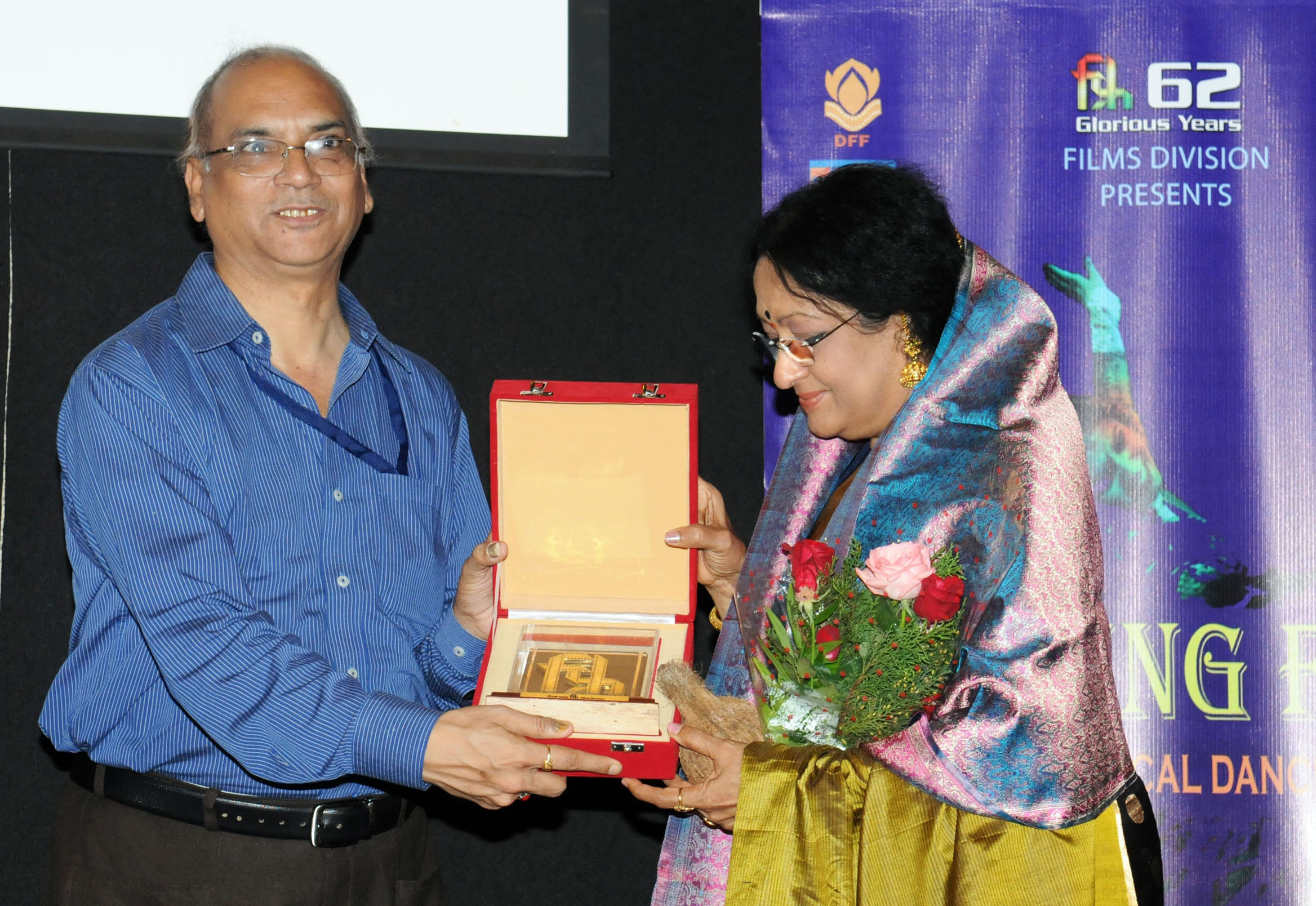
Padma Subrahmanyam being felicitated, at IFFI (2010)

== Awards ==
Padma has received Padma Vibhushan in 2024, Padma Bhushan in 2003 and Padma Shri in 1981, which are among the highest civilian awards of India. During her dancing career, she has received more than 100 awards, including;

- Sangeet Natak Akademi Award (1983)
- Padma Bhushan (2003)
- Padma Shri (1981)
- Kalaimamani Award from the government of Tamil Nadu
- Kalidas Samman from the federal government of Madhya Pradesh,
- Nishagandhi Puraskaram by the Government of Kerala in 2015,
- Nada Brahmam from Narada Gana Sabha in Chennai,
- Bharata Sastra Rakshamani from the Jagadguru Shankaracharya of Kanchipuram .
- Nehru Award (1983) from the Soviet Union
- Fukuoka Asian Culture Prize from Japan, for "her contribution to development and harmony in Asia"
