= Remo (film) =

2016 Indian film by Bakkiyaraj Kannan

- Theatrical release poster
- Directed by: Bakkiyaraj Kannan
- Written by: Bakkiyaraj Kannan
- Produced by: R. D. Raja
- Starring: Sivakarthikeyan; Keerthy Suresh
- Cinematography: P. C. Sreeram
- Edited by: Ruben
- Music by: Anirudh Ravichander
- Production company: 24AM Studios
- Distributed by: Thameens Films; Sri Venkateswara Creations
- Release date: 7 October 2016
- Running time: 150 minutes
- Country: India
- Language: Tamil

Remo is a 2016 Indian Tamil-language romantic comedy film written and directed by Bakkiyaraj Kannan, in his directorial debut and produced by R. D. Raja under 24AM Studios. The film stars Sivakarthikeyan and Keerthy Suresh, while Sathish, Rajendran, Aadukalam Naren, Anson Paul, K. S. Ravikumar, Saranya Ponvannan and Sri Divya portray supporting roles. The cinematography was handled by P. C. Sreeram, and editing work was done by Ruben. Sound designer Resul Pookutty, was also a part of the film. The soundtrack album and background score has been composed by Anirudh Ravichander, and the soundtrack received positive response, upon release. The film follows an aspiring actor who decides to don as a female nurse, to test his acting skills and also to win the hearts of his lady love, who is a doctor by profession.

Remo is the first film produced by R. D. Raja, who earlier worked as a creative producer for Sivakarthikeyan, in his films Varuthapadatha Valibar Sangam, Maan Karate, Kaaki Sattai and Rajinimurugan. The film was initially scheduled to release on 14 March 2015, but was briefly delayed due to the script completion, and finalising the cast and crew. The project was started, with the announcement of technical crew on 1 July 2015. Principal photography of this film took place on 25 October 2015 in Chennai, and continued till 2 August 2016. Filming was held in Chennai, Vizag and Pondicherry. The film's title Remo was announced in February 2016.

The film had a worldwide theatrical release on 7 October 2016, coinciding with the occasion of Dusshera festival. The film received mostly positive reviews from critics and audience, praising Sivakarthikeyan's performance in the role of a female nurse, and the efforts he took for donning the make over, background score, soundtrack, cinematography and comedy. However, the film later faced criticism for glorifying stalking and the way in which Keerthy Suresh's character was written for the film. The film received three nominations at the 64th Filmfare Awards South, and five nominations at the 6th South Indian International Movie Awards, with two wins, and Sivakarthikeyan receiving the SIIMA Award for Best Actor. It was remade in Odia as Sister Sridevi (2017).

== Plot ==
This is a story of a boy who goes to extreme lengths of disguising his gender to win the love of his beloved.

Siva aka S.K is a theatre actor whose only aim is to become a superstar like Rajinikanth. However, his inability to act in romantic scenes hinders his path to the dream, and is even rejected by director K. S. Ravikumar during the audition for his new film Avvai Shanmugi 2, a sequel to his own 1996 film, Avvai Shanmugi. He comes across Kavya, who is a doctor, and instantly falls in love with her. He goes to her house to propose his love, only to find out that she is engaged to a doctor named Vishwanath alias Vishwa. Siva, though deeply saddened at this development, decides to woo Kavya anyway and somehow break her engagement with Vishwa. He disguises himself as a woman nurse, going by the name of "Remo" (short for "Regina Motwani", a combination of the names of actresses Regina Cassandra and Hansika Motwani), and takes up a job in the same hospital where Kavya works.

Ensuring that Kavya never finds out his true identity, Siva as Remo establishes a close friendship with her but is unable to convince her to end her engagement with Vishwa, no matter how many times he (As Remo) brings the subject up. Undeterred, he organises a massive surprise on her birthday and proposes to her as Siva. Kavya, who has been charmed by the surprise and fallen in love with Siva, is in a dilemma as she is unable to decide between Vishwa and Siva. Siva takes advantage of her dilemma and juggles the roles of both Siva and Remo with the aim of breaking her engagement, all the while hiding his dual identity from her. Eventually, Kavya gives in and admits her feelings to Siva, but, to the shock of both her and Siva, Vishwa has decided to prepone their marriage to the very next day because he had caught her sharing a romantic moment with Siva. Kavya decides to end her engagement and leave her house to be with Siva. While Kavya pours out her feelings to Siva (who is disguised as Remo), Vishwa arrives with some goons to forcibly take her away. Siva, still in his Remo guise, thrashes Vishwa and his goons, but at the same moment, he is forced to rush to the hospital to attend to a terminally-ill orphan named Nancy, with whom he had established a close bond. On Nancy's cajoling (Siva as Remo has earlier promised her that he would "change himself" to a man as a "magic trick"), Siva removes his Remo disguise, exposing his identity to Kavya. Betrayed and hurt, Kavya berates Siva for cheating her and ending her engagement and warns him never to go behind her again. Despite Siva's repeated pleas, Kavya refuses to budge and Siva sadly walks away.

A few months later, Kavya's new friend (an old man) sits next to her on the bus. Kavya tells her latest problem to him: Siva is still attracted to her and constantly calls her, despite her having changed her number 46 times. However, she also admits that she still loves Siva and is only avoiding him as she wants to punish him for cheating her earlier. At this juncture, she accidentally finds out that the old man is none other than Siva in disguise. After scolding Siva for cheating her yet again, she softens and asks him to marry her, to which he happily agrees.

The film ends with Siva finally achieving his dream: acting along with his best friend Vallikanth in a movie which seems to be his life story named 'Remo Nee Kadhalan', directed by K. S. Ravikumar, in which actress Sri Divya plays the role of Kavya as Dr. Divya.

== Cast ==
- Sivakarthikeyan as Siva "SK" / Regina Motwani "Remo"
- Keerthy Suresh as Dr. Kavya
- Anson Paul as Dr. Viswanathan "Viswa"
- Sathish as Vallikanth
- K. S. Ravikumar as himself (AVM film director)
- Saranya Ponvannan as Siva's mother
- Rajendran as Mohana Santhosh
- Yogi Babu as a local gangster who falls in love with Remo
- Arunraja Kamaraj as Arun
- Aadukalam Naren as Kavya's father
- Mayilswamy as a Kavya's house security guard
- Swaminathan as Moulee Anna
- Baby Raksha Chauhan as Nancy
- Kalyani Natarajan as Kavya's mother
- Priyadharshini Rajkumar as Viswa's mother
- Rahul Thatha as Patient
- Pratap K. Pothen as Dr. S. Ravichandran (uncredited)
- Sri Divya in a special appearance as Dr. Divya
- Raju Sundaram in a special appearance in the song "Tamilselvi"
- Bakkiyaraj Kannan in a special appearance in the song "Sirikaddhey" & "Tamilselvi"
- S. J. Suryah as Narrator

== Production ==
=== Development ===
R. D. Raja, who worked as a production consultant for movies Boss Engira Baskaran, Enthiran and Jilla, turned into a creative producer for P. Madan under the banner Escape Artists Motion Pictures. The company had produced Maan Karate and Kakki Sattai which stars Sivakarthikeyan in the lead role. During the post-production works of the latter in early February 2015, Sivakarthikeyan announced that he would work on a film, which will be produced by R. D. Raja under the banner 24AM Studios and directed by newcomer Bakkiyaraj Kannan.

The film was launched on 15 March 2015, but was briefly delayed to allow Bakkiyaraj Kannan to complete the script and finalise the cast and crew. Anirudh Ravichander who had composed for his earlier films, too joined as the composer in late June 2015. The project started on 1 July 2015, with the announcement of technical crew, which includes veteran cinematographer P. C. Sreeram, Academy award-winning sound designer Resul Pookutty, film editor Ruben, art director T. Muthuraj, stunt choreographer Anal Arasu, dance choreographer Raju Sundaram, Chennai-based costume designers Nalini Sriram, Anu Parthasarathy, Chaitanya Rao, Sean Foot from Weta Workshop, VFX Supervisor R. C. Kamalakannan as the crew members.

Sivakarthikeyan reported in the media to be sporting a female look for certain scenes. The makers officially announced the title as Remo on 17 February 2016, coinciding with the actor's birthday, which was inspired from Vikram's character in Anniyan (2005) directed by S. Shankar.

=== Casting ===
Shruti Hassan, Samantha Ruth Prabhu and Amy Jackson were signed on to portray the lead female role, but they turned down the offer, due to schedule conflicts. In October 2015, Keerthy Suresh was finalised as the heroine, collaborating with the actor for the second time after Rajinimurugan (2016). Sathish and Rajendran were signed in as the comedians for the film. Saranya Ponvannan was chosen to play the role of Sivakarthikeyan's mother in the film. The supporting cast of the film includes Yogi Babu, Arunraja Kamaraj, Aadukalam Naren, Mayilsamy and Anson Paul, where the latter playing the villain role. In late June 2016, director K. S. Ravikumar and actress Sri Divya signed in to make a special appearance in the film. Keerthy Suresh's maternal grandmother, Saroja, made her acting debut through this film.

=== Characters and looks ===
Sivakarthikeyan was spotted in three different looks, a youngster, woman, old man in the film. Sean Foot of Weta Workshop, who was a part in Vikram's I (2015), was revealed to be on board for make-up and special effects. It was also known that Sivakarthikeyan, will feature as a nurse in 60% of the film. He also dubbed in female voice, for his role as a nurse in the film, with the assistance of sound designer Resul Pookutty.

The actor opened up about this in an interview with Kaushik LM, for The News Minute:

After director Bakkiyaraj's narration, I didn't open up to anyone for a few days as I couldn't visualize myself as a lady. I finally shared this idea with my friends, including Sathish and Arunraja Kamaraj, and narrated the script to them for about 45 mins. They responded positively and laughed at the very same moments which appealed to me as well. Cross-dressing is the biggest challenge in cinema and I've given it my all for Remo. I don't see myself taking up such an experiment again. I couldn't afford to look hefty in the nurse look and had to become really lean. I stopped gymming for about 7 months and lost up to 9 kilos. I had to look cute in this look and match Keerthy (Suresh)'s age, too. Also, for these portions, I dubbed for just five minutes of footage each day. I took about 4 to 5 hours each day in the morning to complete this. I used to shuttle from my house in ECR to Prasad Labs daily. It was tough, as my voice needed ample rest while dubbing for the lady portions.

=== Filming ===
The film's principal photography commenced on 25 October 2015 with a photo shoot organised by Venket Ram. The film's introduction song was thereafter shot during November 2015 in the newly opened Chennai Metro and was choreographed by Raju Sundaram. After filming many portions which took place extensively in Chennai, the team moved to Vizag, in March 2016, for a new schedule. The last schedule of the film was commenced in May 2016, amidst post-production works. The film's shooting was wrapped up on 2 August 2016, and Sivakarthikeyan moved for his next film's shooting, which was directed by Mohan Raja.

== Themes and influences ==
Sivakarthikeyan's lady getup in the film, gets inspired from Kamal Hassan's Avvai Shanmughi (1996). The Times of India, referred the film as a rejig of all other films – Tootsie (1982), Minnale (2001) and the actor's own Maan Karate (2014).

In an interview with Galatta, about the promotions for his upcoming film Velaikkaran (2017), Sivakarthikeyan explains that the director Bakkiyaraj Kannan, inspired this from Alaippayuthey (2000), which was a classic film, in which the character Karthik (played by Madhavan in this film), woos his love Sakthi (Shalini) and then falls in love. So Sivakarthikeyan, told that "If one woos his lover, by donning a lady getup, then it is a comedy film." says Sivakarthikeyan.

== Music ==
The soundtrack and background score of the film were composed by Anirudh Ravichander, in which he collaborates with Sivakarthikeyan for the fifth time. The album features seven songs, and a bonus track with lyrics were written by Vignesh Shivan, Vivek, Ku. Karthik, Inno Genga and L. H. Harish Raam. The audio rights were acquired by Sony Music India. Before the album being released, four songs, "Remo Nee Kadhalan", "Senjitaley", "Sirikkadhey" and "Come Closer" (a reprised version of "Sirikkadhey"), were released as singles on 23 June, 1 July, 18 and 26 August. The entire album was launched on 5 September 2016, by composer A. R. Rahman, and it was made available to download on the internet. Post-release, a bonus track "Veshangalil Poiyillai" was released on 16 October, coinciding with the composer's birthday.

== Release ==
The film was scheduled for its worldwide theatrical release on 7 October 2016, coinciding with the Dusshera holidays, and also clashing with Rekka and Devi, which were slated to release on the same day. On 27 September, the film was censored with a U certificate from the Central Board of Film Certification, making eligible for exemption of state government's thirty-percent entertainment tax as well. The dubbed Telugu version of the film, which was bagged by Dil Raju, scheduled to release on 4 November. But the film released worldwide on 25 November 2016. The film was released on 9 October 2016, in Japan, at the New Minato Aeon Mall in Nagoya region and the ticket sales were around ¥2000, thus becoming the first Tamil film to release in this region.

== Marketing ==
The first look and the motion poster for the film was supposed to be released at a grand launch event, held on 9 June 2016, but it was pushed to 23 June, to avoid clash with the audio launch event of Rajinikanth-starrer Kabali, which was held on the same day. The event was held on 23 June 2016, at Chennai, where producer A. V. M. Saravanan, director Shankar and many more celebrities marking their presence, at the event, along with the film's cast and crew, and director Shankar launched the first look of the film. It features Sivakarthikeyan, as a youngster and a nurse in the film. The making video of the film was released on 2 July 2016, at the 5th South Indian International Movie Awards event held at Singapore, which shows Sivakarthikeyan's extreme makeover as a female nurse.

The film's producer R. D. Raja, announced that the business of the film will commence on 2 August 2016, making it the first time in the history of Tamil cinema that a production house is opening trading on a film by announcing a date, in which the Tamil Nadu theatrical rights of the film were sold to ₹32 crore (US$3.4 million). The Kerala rights of the film was sold to Shibu Thameens under the Thameens Films banner. AGS Entertainment acquired the distribution rights of the film in the Chengalpet region. The Chennai city theatrical rights were sold to Jazz Cinemas. Prime Media acquired the distribution rights in the United States.

The theatrical trailer of the film released on 19 September 2016. It received overwhelming response from fans, and crossed 3.7 million views, with 61,000 likes, becoming the most viewed Tamil trailer of the year, after Kabali, Theri and Iru Mugan. As a part of the film's promotion, the makers placed many "cupid" statues (an animation figure, which has a major role in the film), across various malls and theatres, to attract kids and adults. The Telugu rights of the film were acquired by Dil Raju. The first look of the film's Telugu version was happened in Hyderabad on 21 October 2016.

== Controversies ==
=== Success meet issue ===
On 12 October 2016, at the success meet of the film, Sivakarthikeyan became emotional. He revealed that, when the film was ready for release, there were quite a few obstacles planted by people who wanted to ensure it didn't release. He faced a similar agony when his Rajini Murugan, saw a delayed release.

P. L. Thenappan, the general secretary of the Tamil Nadu Producers Council, has told a website that K. E. Gnanavel Raja of Studio Green, Madan of Escape Artists and Madhan of Vendhar Movies have filed formal complaints accusing the actor of taking advance amounts to act in their films, but failing to fulfill his commitments. Gnanavel Raja has an agreement copy of their deal, while the other two do not have the same. On the other hand, Sivakarthikeyan has admitted to have taken the advance amount from Gnanavel Raja, but there is no mention of the other two. Actors Silambarasan and Vishal extended support to Sivakarthikeyan about the issue.

=== Stalking controversy ===
Upon release, the film received criticism for glorifying stalking. Chennai based PhD scholar Iswarya V started an online petition against glorification of stalking in Tamil films by their "Calling Out Stalking" campaign, in the aftermath of the Swathi murder case, in June of the same year, which created nationwide uproar; she points that "Tamil films routinely promote stalking as romantic but doesn't know that these are also responsible for crimes against women." The campaign had publicly advocated to boycott the film, because of the glorification of stalking, in which Sivakarthikeyan's character stalks Keerthy Suresh's, by dressing in drag.

The film was subjected to criticism upon release, after many film critics gave harshly critical response because of the theme and the film's subject, which many of them found as regressive and old-fashioned. Apart from stalking, the weak characterisation of the film's lead actress Keerthy Suresh (where her character had similarities to the typical loosu ponnu trope in mainstream cinema), were also noted by critics. Ananda Vikatan, a popular Tamil magazine gave 36 marks to the film, with a bottomline stating that the film is detrimental to the Tamil cinema and society.

Following the controversy, Sivakarthikeyan in March 2018, announced that his future films will not have drinking or stalking scenes. He stated:

As I evolve in my career, I believe it's my duty to convey some message through my films. I did that via my last film Velaikkaran. I'm surprised people still talk about Remo, and I know I'll be asked this question for another five years. But there won't be any drinking scenes or teasing and chasing women in my future films. Most directors avoid such scenes when they're writing for me.

== Reception ==
=== Critical response ===
Baradwaj Rangan of The Hindu wrote "Remo is less about convincing us that a man can become a woman than reminding us Sivakarthikeyan has become a star." M. Suganth of The Times of India, rated the film 3 out of 5 stars, and reviewed "The film is a rejig of elements that we have seen in other films earlier." Sify rated the film 2.75 out of 5, with a statement "Remo is a watchable romantic comedy which is both funny and flashy."

S. Saraswathi of the Rediff rated 2.5 out of 5 stars and stated "Sivakarthikeyan does make a pretty picture as a girl, but other than that debutant director Bakkiyaraj Kannan's Remo has nothing new to offer." The Indian Express rated the film 1.5 out of 5 stars, with a verdict "When you walk into a Sivakarthikeyan film, especially one like Remo, you can't expect logic; you can't expect to be bowled over by a great script and you definitely can't expect to like everything you see in the film. it's disappointing that so much effort has gone into everything but the script, making Remo entertaining but not charming enough". S. Srivatsan of India Today rated the film 1.5 out of 5 and stated that "Remo itself seems to be a spoof of any of actor-filmmaker Bhagyaraj's films. In all, Remo gives an all-new dimension to stalking. As its lead actor puts it, there's no problem in stalking as long as 'your love is pure'. Not sure what common people would make out of it." Sreedhar Pillai for Firstpost reviewed it as "On the whole Remo is entertaining, provided you leave your brain behind, like the cliche goes. See it for Sivakarthikeyan, the one-man entertainer, who provides some of the craziest moments in the film." Top10Cinema gave a rating of 2.5 out of 5, stating "Remo despites having some drawbacks would definitely impress the family audiences, specifically for this festive season of long holidays." and gave a verdict "Time-worn love story packaged with Sivakarthikeyan's dedication and technical brilliance".

Hindustan Times rated the film 2 out of 5, stating that "A done-to-death plot can't save this film despite some impressive performances by Keerthy Suresh and Sivakarthikeyan." Silverscreen reviewed that "With a film like Remo, the audience knows that brains and sensibilities need to be left behind at home. But it takes a lot more than that to scrape this empty and misogynistic barrel for any kernels of enjoyment." Anupama Subramanian of Deccan Chronicle, rated 2 out of 5, stating "Remo', turns out to be a marketing effort that targets young males with very stereotypical behaviors that are generally found in other films. The sort of young desperado who comes across a woman and decides that she is his fit and henceforth determines to pursue her wherever she goes. And, this despite the woman not reciprocating the said approaches. There's another word reserved for such conduct: stalking, or perhaps, harassment. This in short is a Bakkiyaraj Kannan's 'Remo' feel like: a complete mismatch of tongue-in-cheek and subject matter."

=== Box office ===
The film which released along with Rekka and Devi, made a good opening grossing ₹8 crore (US$850,000) crores on the first day, becoming the third highest opener after Kabali and Theri. All the three films slowed down the business of M.S. Dhoni: The Untold Story, which crossed the ₹2 crore mark in Chennai. On the opening weekend the film grossed ₹19.5 crore (US$2.1 million) crores. By the end of the first week, the film grossed ₹22.5 crore (US$2.4 million) crores. Within 10 days, the film earned ₹42 crore (US$4.5 million) at the worldwide box office. In Chennai, the film collected ₹1.71 crore (US$180,000) in the opening weekend, ₹2.10 crore (US$220,000) in the first week and ₹1.63 crore (US$170,000), in the second week. Totaling up to ₹6.45 crore (US$690,000), Remo, stands at third place crossing the 6-crore mark, followed by other profitable ventures Thani Oruvan and Vedalam.

However, the film's box office performance was slightly affected by the Diwali releases, Nevertheless, the extensive promotional campaign, helped to gain profits. The film collected ₹49.5 crore (US$5.3 million) in Tamil Nadu, ₹3.4 crore (US$360,000) in Kerala, ₹3 crore (US$320,000) in Karnataka, and ₹2.6 crore (US$280,000) in Andhra Pradesh and Telangana, with ₹50 lakh (US$53,000), in other parts of India, the overall box-office collection accounts to ₹59 crore (US$6.3 million), and collected ₹17.33 crore (US$1.9 million) in overseas. The film collected ₹76 crore (equivalent to ₹119 crore or US$13 million in 2026). A commercial success, it was listed as the third highest-grossing film at the Chennai box office, and also listed in the top five profitable ventures of the year.

== Accolades ==
Ceremony	Category	Nominee	Result
64th Filmfare Awards South	Best Supporting Actor	Sathish	Nominated
64th Filmfare Awards South	Best Music Director	Anirudh Ravichander	Nominated
64th Filmfare Awards South	Best Playback Singer (Male)	Anirudh Ravichander for "Senjitaley"	Nominated
6th South Indian International Movie Awards	Best Actor	Sivakarthikeyan	Won
6th South Indian International Movie Awards	Best Comedian	Sathish	Nominated
6th South Indian International Movie Awards	Best Debut Director	Bakkiyaraj Kannan	Nominated
6th South Indian International Movie Awards	Best Music Director	Anirudh Ravichander	Nominated
6th South Indian International Movie Awards	Best Male Playback Singer	Anirudh Ravichander for "Senjitaley"	Won
Edison Awards 2016	Best Comedian	Sathish	Won
Edison Awards 2016	Best Music Director	Anirudh Ravichander	Won
Edison Awards 2016	Best Debut Director	Bakkiyaraj Kannan	Won

== Impact ==
Despite the success, the film received criticism for its apparent glorification of misogyny and stalking. Following the controversy of the portrayal of stalking in the film, YouTuber Dudemachi Varun inspired Sivakarthikeyan's Regina Motwani character about the discussion of stalking in Tamil films, through The Dudemachi Show. Another YouTube channel Put Chutney, used some of the references from the film, for an awareness video about workplace harassment, which featured Venkatesh Harinathan, Lakshmi Priyaa Chandramouli and Vinodhini Vaidyanathan. Three women police officers raised awareness about misogyny in Tamil films, using footage of a particular scene from the film, for an example.

On 19 October 2016, Rajinikanth who watched the special screening of the film, praised Sivakarthikeyan for his effort. In the end of 2016, the film was featured in the most searched word in Google, across Tamil Nadu, one of the few Indian films to feature in this list.

A Chennai-based startup company led by Sakthivel Panneerselvam and team, recreated a huge set based on a scene where Sivakarthikeyan proposes to Keerthy Suresh, for a wedding purposal. Sakthivel stated that "Once we recreated an entire set based on the film for a client. He wanted to propose to his long-time partner and they loved the film. So we arranged for everything, from fire crackers to the elaborate fairy lights. The in-house team of 5 along with our freelancers meticulously planned and designed the sets and the results were fabulous." This scene was parodied in the spoof film Tamizh Padam 2.0 (2018).
