= Velaiilla Pattadhari =

2014 Indian film by R. Velraj

- Theatrical release poster
- Directed by: Velraj
- Written by: Velraj
- Produced by: Dhanush
- Starring: Dhanush; Amala Paul
- Cinematography: Velraj
- Edited by: Rajesh Kumar
- Music by: Anirudh Ravichander
- Production company: Wunderbar Films
- Distributed by: Escape Artists Motion Pictures; Wunderbar Films; Kalasangham Films
- Release date: 18 July 2014
- Running time: 135 minutes
- Country: India
- Language: Tamil
- Budget: ₹8 crore
- Box office: ₹53 crore

Velaiilla Pattadhari (transl. The Unemployed Graduate), popularly referred to as VIP, is a 2014 Indian Tamil-language action comedy film written and directed by Velraj, in his directorial debut, and produced by Dhanush, who also plays the lead role alongside Amala Paul, Vivek, Saranya Ponvannan, Samuthirakani and Surbhi. It is the predecessor to Velaiilla Pattadhari 2 (2017), which was directed by Soundarya Rajinikanth. The film follows Raghuvaran "Raghu," an unemployed graduate, who tries to overcome various obstacles before and after finding employment.

Dhanush, besides acting, producing and distributing the venture in association with Escape Artists Motion Pictures, also worked as the lyricist and album producer on the film's original soundtrack. The film's album and score were composed by Anirudh Ravichander. The stunts were handled by Hari Dinesh. Principal photography commenced in August 2013 and was completed by May 2014, with the film being shot primarily in Chennai. The film was released on 18 July 2014, and received a positive critical reception. It was remade in Kannada as Brihaspathi (2018).

== Plot ==
Raghuvaran is a graduate in civil engineering, but he has been unemployed for four years. Raghuvaran is adamant about working in a job related to his field only and he is unwilling to accept any other profession. Raghuvaran often comes into conflict with his father Krishnamoorthy, who considers him irresponsible. Raghuvaran's younger brother, Karthik, works for an IT company, earning well and, evidently with his father's approval. Raghuvaran's mother, Bhuvana, however, supports Raghuvaran. Raghuvaran falls for his neighbour's daughter, Shalini who hates Raghuvaran initially, but she warms up to him after hearing about the difficulties Raghuvaran is facing and Shalini eventually reciprocates Raghuvaran's love.

One day, while Raghuvaran's father and Karthik are absent, Raghuvaran is asked to look after his mother, who has a heart condition. However, Raghuvaran goes out on a date with Shalini. Raghuvaran gets continuous phone calls from his mother, which he ignores despite Shalini's insistence on picking the phone up. However, on returning home, Raghuvaran finds out that his mother died of a heart attack. Raghuvaran feels guilty about not being there when his mother needed him and develops depression. Meanwhile, Bhuvana's lungs are transplanted into Anitha, a chain smoker who developed lung cancer. Anitha's father Ramkumar is the chairman of a civil engineering company in Chennai and offers Raghuvaran a job as a token of his gratitude for saving his daughter's life. Raghuvaran accepts the job while also requesting Anitha not to smoke, to which Anitha agrees. Six months later, Raghuvaran is offered an assignment on a government project to construct high-rise flats to re-house people living in a nearby slum. Azhagusundaram and Manickam are appointed as Raghuvaran's assistants. Raghuvaran successfully wins the contract from the government and begins work on it immediately.

Arun Subramaniam, a business novice who took over his father's company's Chennai branch, bids for the same contract, even by using illegal methods. Furious that he did not get the land, he tries to thwart Raghuvaran's progress in a number of ways. Raghuvaran overcomes each of these obstacles and continues his work, but Arun eventually hires rowdies to beat up Raghuvaran's workers at the construction site. The workers get injured and end up in the hospital, which prompts Raghuvaran to go to Arun's office to put an end to this issue. He makes Arun confess that he sent the rowdies, which is recorded by a microspy camera, and demands an apology from Arun, blackmailing him and saying that otherwise the video would be made public. Fearing that the video could tarnish his reputation, Arun's father, Venkat, sends Arun to the hospital to apologise. Raghuvaran accepts the apology and the project is completed within ten months.

On the day of the flats' inauguration, Arun and a gang of rowdies ambush Raghuvaran en route. He outwits them but spares Arun, much to Arun's surprise. Raghuvaran says he has no intention to compete with or beat him and wishes to be his friend. Raghuvaran takes Arun to the site on his moped, where the state public works minister and Anitha inaugurate the flats.

== Cast ==
- Dhanush as Raghuvaran
- Amala Paul as Shalini (Voice dubbed by Savitha Radhakrishnan)
- Saranya Ponvannan as Bhuvana, Raghuvaran's mother
- Samuthirakani as Krishnamoorthy, Raghuvaran's father
- Vivek as Azhagusundaram
- Hrishikesh as Karthik, Raghuvaran's brother
- Surbhi as Anitha (Voice dubbed by Raveena Ravi)
- Amitash Pradhan as Arun Subramaniam
- Cell Murugan as Manickam
- Vignesh Shivan as Vignesh
- Meera Krishnan as Shalini's mother
- D. R. K. Kiran as MLA Varadarajan
- M. J. Shriram as Ramkumar, Anitha's father
- Sanjay Kumar Asrani as Venkat Subramaniam
- Sridhar as the Minister for Public Works

== Production ==
=== Development ===
Velraj and Dhanush had worked together on several projects including Aadukalam (2011) and 3 (2012) as cinematographer and lead actor respectively. During the production of those films, Dhanush suggested Velraj to make his debut as a director and promised to play the lead role. After Velraj showed Dhanush the film's script, Dhanush agreed to play the lead role as well as produce the film. In July 2013, Dhanush confirmed his collaboration with Velraj, whilst also confirming the inclusion of Amala Paul as the female lead and Anirudh Ravichander as the music director. The title of the film, Velaiilla Pattadhari was unveiled on 15 August 2013. After the title launch, Dhanush confirmed that filming would start on 20 August 2013.

Regarding the film's development, Velraj said, "Dhanush must have liked something about me to help me grow. It was during our Aadukalam days that he promised to make me a director and said he would act in my first film. Several directors would have lined up for this opportunity. He chose me. It's just a bond we share."

Velraj shot the film alongside his commitments as cinematographer for Poriyaalan (2014) and Vai Raja Vai, while Anirudh Ravichander and Kola Bhaskar joined the team as music composer and editor respectively. However, Bhaskar was replaced with M. V. Rajesh Kumar after scheduling conflicts arose. The film was planned as a "message to the youth with some comedy on rising unemployment and the growing frustration for jobs with love".

=== Casting ===
When Velraj showed Dhanush the script for the film, he was impressed by it and immediately offered to act in it as well as bankroll the venture. Velraj said besides acting, Dhanush suggested additional inputs to the script. Rather than demand changes, the actor collaborated with the director to develop the best script for the film. Dhanush's well-toned body was remarked upon by the media, but Dhanush clarified the workout was mostly for promoting the film rather than having done it as an integral part of his character. Velraj later commented about the requirement of a muscular appearance for a fight scene in the film's climax, resulting in Dhanush toning his body for the sequence. Dhanush's character was named Raghuvaran after the actor of the same name.

Amala Paul was selected to play the role of a doctor named Shalini. She described her character as "very different" from those that she had done before, and that the characters in the film were drawn from real-life archetypes. Vivek, who was added to the cast in May 2014, stated during a press meet of the film that he initially rejected the role and as a result, Dhanush decided to make someone else play the role. Vivek then accepted the role for Dhanush's sake. Saranya Ponvannan was selected to play the role of Bhuvana, Raghuvaran's mother, while Samuthirakani was chosen to play Dhanush's father. Samuthirakani was suggested to Dhanush by Vetrimaaran.

Actress Surbhi began filming her scenes in early March 2014. Hrishikesh, who plays Karthik, Raghuvaran's sibling, received an SMS from Dhanush's production office, which asked him to audition for the role. He was selected after his screen test ended successfully. Amitash Pradhan played the main antagonist, Arun Subramaniam. He was recruited from the Anupam Kher Acting School. In an interview with Gulf News, Amitash described his character to be not the "stereotypical villain" often seen in Tamil cinema, and that his character was more cunning.

=== Filming ===
Principal photography formally began on 20 August 2013. An initial production poster was released to the media on 25 December 2013. On 31 December 2013, the team released a teaser trailer featuring Dhanush, Amala Paul and Saranya. The team began the final shoot on 2 May 2014, with Vivek amongst other actors joining the cast. Filming was completed on 4 May 2014.

During the film's shoot, Velraj would often forget to say "Action!", but despite this, there were hardly any retakes. Being a cinematographer, Velraj gave priority to visual presentations and costume designing in the film. Director Subramaniam Siva, who had earlier collaborated with Dhanush for Thiruda Thirudi (2003), helped with the post-production work involved in the film. According to Velraj, during the entire schedule of filming, the speaking parts were completed in 52 days.

== Themes and influences ==
Velaiilla Pattadhari raises the issue of unemployed graduates in society. Dhanush's character, Raghuvaran, represented the unemployed graduate who is waiting to move up the social ladder. One scene shows Raghuvaran delivering a speech about the difficulties in finishing an engineering degree only to remain jobless, with some of them having to take jobs not related to their fields to make a living. Dhanush's characterisation was similar to his characters from his previous films like Polladhavan (2007), Yaaradi Nee Mohini (2008) and Padikkadavan (2009). Both Baradwaj Rangan of The Hindu and M. Suganth of The Times of India compare Dhanush's and Amitash's characters and their encounters with each other to those that took place between the second king of the United Kingdom of Israel and Judah, David and the Philistine warrior, Goliath.

The film shifts from exploring self-pity to proving a point, where the protagonist overcomes all hurdles and outwits a rich adversary, as well as building a successful relationship. The father-figure in the film disapproves of his son's continued unemployment, while his mother defends him. Karthik, meanwhile, is a contrasting figure, being settled and prosperous. Amala Paul's character, Shalini, is shown as Raghuvaran's confidante though he feels jealous when she interacts with his brother. The film also portrays the relationship between a mother and her son as particularly important. Prior to the release, there were concerns raised that the film was similar to the Kamal Haasan starrer, Sathyaa (1988). Dhanush clarified that there were no similarities between the films, nor was it similar to another Haasan film, Varumayin Niram Sivappu (1980), except for the fact that the protagonist was unemployed.

== Music ==
The film's soundtrack and score were composed by Anirudh Ravichander. The album, containing eight tracks, was initially scheduled to be released in January 2014, but the release was brought forward to 14 February 2014, to add two additional songs. The team also recorded a track described as a "lilting melody" between Dhanush and singer S. Janaki in October 2013. Anirudh promoted the album on Sun Music a week before the film's release. The track list was released on 10 February 2014. The album was launched at the Suryan FM 93.5 radio station with Dhanush, Amala Paul and Anirudh Ravichander in attendance. The album received positive response from critics. The songs "Velaiilla Pattadhari", "Poo Indru Neeyaga", "What a Karuvad" and "Udhungada Sangu" topped the Radio Mirchi South charts for 31 weeks.

== Release ==
The theatrical rights of the film in Tamil Nadu were sold to Madhan of Escape Artists Motion Pictures. ATMUS Entertainment distributed the film in the United States. On 1 July 2014, Madhan confirmed that the film would be released on 18 July 2014.

The film was released in 350 screens in Tamil Nadu. The film released in 60 screens in Chengalpattu, 65 screens in Kovai, 30 screens in Madurai, 30 screens in Trichy and 55 screens in Salem. The film also released in 60 screens in Kerala and 65 screens in Karnataka.

The film was later dubbed and released into Telugu-language under the title Raghuvaran B.Tech and in Hindi as VIP.

=== Marketing ===
The official first look poster of Velaiilla Pattadhari was released by Dhanush through his official Twitter account on 24 December 2013. The teaser of the film was uploaded on YouTube on 9 February 2014. The official trailer of the film was released on 18 June 2014 on YouTube, and trended on social networking sites following its release, reaching 2 million views in two weeks.

== Controversies ==
Some of the posters depicting Dhanush smoking were removed, followed by the complaint raised by the authorities, as this did not conform to the Tobacco Control Board's guidelines. The administrators of the Ramakrishna Mission School opposed a dialogue spoken by the character Raghuvaran attributing his weak English to the subpar education he received in that school. Velraj explained that they never contemplated such a huge opposition and did not want to hurt the sentiments of anyone, hence it was decided to remove the dialogue from the film.

== Home media ==
The film's satellite rights were sold to Sun TV. The television premiere took place on 15 January 2015, coinciding with Pongal. The dubbed Telugu version Raghuvaran B. Tech was aired on Star Maa, which bought the Telugu satellite rights on 22 February 2015.

== Reception ==
=== Critical response ===
The film received generally positive reviews from critics. Writing for The Hindu, Baradwaj Rangan said "There are films that cater to the actor, and there are films that cater to the star — in Velayilla Pattathari [sic], Dhanush gets a film where he gets to showcase both sides ... [Velraj has] given actor-Dhanush fans half a movie to love, and he's handed over the rest to the star-Dhanush fans. Is there much use complaining when both actor and star are in such fine form?" Sify wrote "Velai Illa Pattadhari [sic] is a rollicking fun ride. It's pure unadulterated masala laced with all essential ingredients that work with mass audiences. Writer, director and cinematographer R Velraj has made a dream debut with a perfect commercial mix".

M. Suganth of The Times of India gave the film 4 out of 5 stars and wrote, "[...] Velraj (the cinematographer making his directorial debut) superbly manages to strike a balance between the emotional and mass hero moments.[...] It is fantastic to see Dhanush take this boy-next-door to mass hero mode and he has quite a few punchy lines." Anupama Subramanian of the Deccan Chronicle gave the film 3.5 out of 5 stars and wrote, "Dhanush has chosen a befitting script for his 25th milestone film and in the company of his favourite cinematographer turned filmmaker Velraj, who has churned out a mass family entertainer with Velai Illa Pattadhari [sic]", calling it a "wholesome entertainer".

S. Saraswathi of Rediff gave the film 3 stars out of 5 and concluded, "Velaiyilla Pattathari [sic] is two hours of pure entertainment, definitely worth a watch". Haricharan Pudipeddi of IANS gave the film 3 stars out 5 and stated, "While VIP fortifies Dhanush's heroism in a tailor-made role which he comfortably pulls off, it also achieves so many things right as a commercial film and that's what works in its favour. Dhanush reinforces he's still cut out for commercial cinema with Velaiyilla Pattathari [sic]".

In contrast, Malini Mannath of The New Indian Express wrote, "With its racy first half and a predictable second half, VIP is an average entertainer". Gautaman Bhaskaran of the Hindustan Times gave the film 2 out of 5, saying "Although Vellaiyilla Pattathari [sic] presents a grave social malaise – that of joblessness among engineering graduates in Tamil Nadu with 3000-odd colleges turning out hundreds of thousands of degree holders year after year – the script plays goodsport. Performances do not lift the movie either".

=== Box office ===
The film was released in 30 screens in Chennai alone. Sreedhar Pillai stated that the film had made ₹100.6 million on its opening day in Tamil Nadu alone. The film collected approximately ₹13 crore (US$1.3 million) in Tamil Nadu in first weekend and over ₹24 crore (US$2.5 million) in ten days. The film collected a nett collection of ₹50 crore (US$5.2 million) worldwide in fourth week. The first weekend gross was ₹ 190.8 million. The film made ₹ 250 million in Tamil Nadu overall.

Velaiilla Pattadhari made ₹ 9.83 million in the UK and Ireland together. It also grossed ₹ 3.735 million in Australia. The film made one month's collection of ₹ 22.3 million in Malaysia. Overall, the film grossed ₹ 530 million worldwide.

== Sequel ==
In November 2016, Dhanush announced that he would act in the sequel of the film to be directed by Soundarya Rajinikanth and produced by S. Thanu. Filming for the sequel began on 15 December 2016 with actress Kajol being drafted to play "a prominent role" marking her comeback to Tamil films since Minsara Kanavu (1997). Paul and Samuthirakani reprised their roles from Velaiilla Pattadhari. The sequel was released on 11 August 2017.

== Remake ==
The film was remade in Kannada as Brihaspathi (2018) directed by Nanda Kishore with Manoranjan Ravichandran.
