= Podaa Podi (soundtrack) =

Soundtrack album by Dharan Kumar
- Released: 10 October 2012
- Recorded: 2010–2011
- Genre: Feature film soundtrack
- Length: 34:47
- Language: Tamil
- Label: Sony Music India
- Producer: Dharan Kumar

Dharan Kumar chronology
The Thriller (2010)	Podaa Podi (2012)	Virattu (2013)

Singles from Podaa Podi
- 1. "Love Panlaama Venama" Released: 6 September 2012

Podaa Podi is the soundtrack album for 2012 Tamil film of the same name directed by Vignesh Shivan, starring Silambarasan and Varalaxmi Sarathkumar. The film's musical score and soundtrack were composed by Dharan Kumar, and featured eight songs with lyrics written by Silambarasan, Vignesh, Na. Muthukumar and Vaali. The song "Love Panlaama Venama" was released as the lead single on 6 September 2012, and the album was released under the Sony Music India label on 10 October.

== Development ==
Dharan Kumar composed the film score and soundtrack for Podaa Podi, having previously worked with Vignesh Shivan on a short film. In August 2010, Dharan stated that he had composed six songs for the film and provided four songs and few themes to the film unit for filming. Dharan further described the script as "quite challenging as it is about dance, salsa in particular". This resulted in Dharan composing few songs based on rhythm and blues and having a feel of the 1980s. Dharan described the music as quite experimental and wanted it to feel fresh and new to the listener.

The introduction song "Love Panlaama Venama" was composed in the hip hop genre and was recorded in "conversational style with the leads wondering whether to fall in love or not." Dharan further composed a romantic number, similar to "Pachchai Niramae", a melancholic number, fast-paced song and a unique kuthu song. He further added that the film's lead actor Silambarasan had sung two songs and that composer-singer Yuvan Shankar Raja would also sing one of the songs. Following the success of "The Love Anthem", Silambarasan eventually planned to collaborate with international singers to record a song for the film, but the plans did not materialize. Dharan recorded the songs in London and further collaborated with the symphony orchestra to record the film score in Bangkok.

The album finally features eight tracks, including an instrumental, while Silambarasan has sung three songs, of which two were penned by him; a song by Yuvan Shankar Raja was not featured. The title track had been sung by Benny Dayal and actress-singer Andrea Jeremiah. Besides Silambarasan, director Vignesh Shivan had penned the lyrics for four songs, while Na. Muthukumar and Vaali had written each one song.

== Release ==
The audio rights were acquired by Sony Music India. A rough version of the track "Love Pannlama Venama" was leaked on the Internet in 2009 and went viral. An official complete version of the track was re-released on 6 September 2012, as a single at Suryan FM Radio Station in Chennai, with Silambarasan, Varalaxmi, Dharan and Vignesh attending the event, and was made available for direct download, a month prior to the official audio release for promotional purpose. The entire album was released direct to stores on 10 October 2012. The songs were premiered on Sun Music on the same day of its release.

== Track listing ==
No.	Title	Lyrics	Singer(s)	Length
1.	"Love Panlaama Venama"	Silambarasan	Silambarasan	04:31
2.	"Podaa Podi"	Na. Muthukumar	Benny Dayal, Andrea Jeremiah	04:59
3.	"Hare Rama Hare Krishna"	Vignesh Shivan	Dharan Kumar	04:19
4.	"Maattikittenae"	Vignesh Shivan	Naresh Iyer, Suchitra, Benny Dayal	05:05
5.	"Un Paarvaiyilae"	Vignesh Shivan	Sindhu, M. M. Monisha, Pradeep	02:17
6.	"Appan Mavanae Vaada"	Vaali	Silambarasan	06:23
7.	"Theme of Podaa Podi"	Instrumental	Navin Iyer, Amal Raj	03:38
8.	"I am a Kuthu Dancer"	Silambarasan	Shankar Mahadevan, Silambarasan	03:32

== Reception ==
=== Critical ===
Karthik of Milliblog reviewed "Barring incredibly excessive auto-tuning, Poda Podi is a pretty neat effort." Pavithra Srinivasan of Rediff.com wrote "Dharan's music seems to echo other musicians at several points, and though pleasant, doesn't really linger." Malathi Rangarajan of The Hindu called the title track as "a foot-tapping number from composer Dharan Kumar." A critic based at The Times of India wrote "Dharan Kumar has composed okay songs, but the one that stands out is the title track 'Podaa Podi', which has been doing well on all radio stations." Another critic from NDTV wrote "As far as music is concerned, barring the Love pannlama track, which is a bad rip-off of Eminem's Real Slim Shady, the rest of the album helps the film to maintain some interest."

=== Commercial ===
The soundtrack surpassed the sales of recent albums upon its release. Ashok Parwani, marketing director of Sony Music India, stated, "Poda Podi music album is a runaway super hit. We have already got repeat order from music stores for the CD’s and digital sales are phenomenal. It is number one on FM’s and on mobile."
