= List of songs recorded by Bombay Jayashri =

List of songs recorded by Jayashri
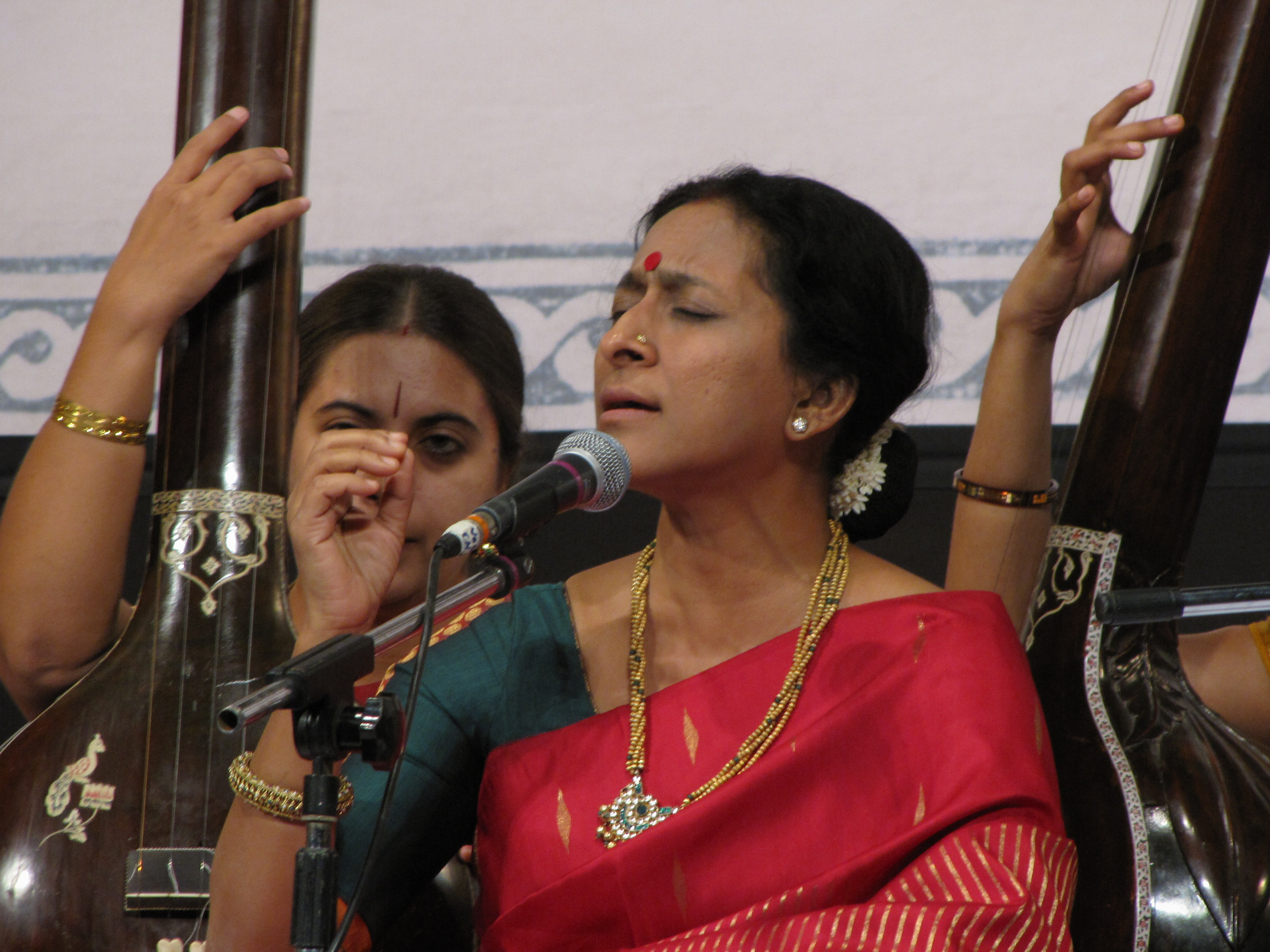
- Jayashri in a concert
- Category: Songs
Tamil Film Songs	70
Telugu Film Songs	30
Malayalam Film Songs	14
Kannada Film Songs	7
Hindi Film Songs	7
Total	124

The following is the list of songs recorded by the popular carnatic vocalist Jayashri in Tamil, Telugu, Kannada, Malayalam and Hindi movies. Jayashri has sung several film songs for movies under music directors like M. S. Viswanathan, Ilayaraja, A. R. Rahman, Yuvan shankar raja, Harris Jayaraj, Dhina, M. M. Keeravani, Shankar–Ehsaan–Loy, R. P. Patnaik, Hariharan – Lesle Lewis, D. Imman and Srikanth Deva. She shot to fame after singing the classical duet song "Narumugaiye" for the film Iruvar along with Unni Krishnan and composed by A. R. Rahman. Her other playback career highlighting song was "Vaseegara" for the film Minnale in 2001, composed by Harris Jayaraj. This song was sung again by herself in the Telugu version of the film (Cheli) also. She had given many hit songs with Harris Jayaraj in various languages. She has a mesmerising voice which makes all class of listeners to pay attention on her songs. She has rendered her voice to popular actresses like Jyothika, Tabu, Asin, Divya Spandana, Rakshitha, Reema Sen, Madhoo, Karthika, Suhasini, Meera Jasmine, Kajal Agarwal, Kamalini Mukherjee, Sneha, Charmi, Nayanthara, Poornima Bhagyaraj and Silk Smitha.

== Film discography ==
=== Tamil songs ===
Bombay Jayashri was debuted by M.S. Viswanathan in the soundtrack album of Thambathigal (1983). Ever since then she left behind a memorable corpus of work in numerous Tamil film albums under many legendary music composers in Tamil cinema.

==== 1980s ====
Year	Movie	Song title	Music director	Co-singers
1983	Thambathigal	"Vaada Kanna"	M. S. Viswanathan	S. P. Balasubrahmanyam
1983	Thambathigal	"Oruvan Oruthi"	M. S. Viswanathan	S. P. Balasubrahmanyam
1983	Thambathigal	"Nenjai Kilappi"	M. S. Viswanathan	Solo
1983	Thambathigal	"Maniyachu"	M. S. Viswanathan	Solo

==== 1990s ====
Year	Movie	Song title	Music director	Co-singers
1994	Vietnam Colony	"Kaiyil Veenai Yendhum"	Ilayaraja	Solo
1997	Iruvar	"Naramugaiye Naramugaiye"	A. R. Rahman	Unni Krishnan
1997	Love Today	"Yen Pennendru"(Duet)	Shiva	Mohammed Aslam
1998	Kanmani Oru Kavithai	"Raagam Azhaithu"	Ilayaraja	Arun Mozhi, K. S. Chithra

==== 2000s ====
Year	Movie	Song title	Music director	Co-singers
2000	James Pandu	"Kannenna Minsarama"	S. A. Rajkumar	Devan
2000	Bharathi	"Ninnai charan"	Ilayaraja	Solo
2001	Minnale	"Vaseegara"	Harris Jayaraj	Solo
2001	Majunu	"Mudhal Kanave"	Harris Jayaraj	Harish Raghavendra
2002	Thulluvadho Ilamai	"Theenda Theenda[Duet]"	Yuvan Shankar Raja	Unni Krishnan
2002	Thulluvadho Ilamai	"Theenda Theenda[Solo]"	Yuvan Shankar Raja	Solo
2003	Kaakha Kaakha	"Ondra Renda"	Harris Jayaraj	Solo
2004	Pudhukottayilirundhu Saravanan	"Malargale"	Yuvan Shankar Raja	Solo
2004	Jana	"Thithi Thidave"	Dhina	Solo
2005	Ghajini	"Suttum Vizhi"	Harris Jayaraj	Sriram Parthasarathy
2005	Thotti Jaya	"Uyire En Uyire"	Harris Jayaraj	Karthik, Anuradha Sriram
2005	Pon Megalai	"Unnai Thedum"	Ilayaraja	
2006	Vettaiyadu Vilayadu	"Paartha Mudhal"	Harris Jayaraj	Unni Menon
2006	Nenjirukkum Varai	"Pudichirukku Pudichirukku"	Srikanth Deva	Vijay Yesudas
2007	Pollathavan	"Minnalgal Koothadum"	G. V. Prakash Kumar	Karthik
2007	Sringaram	"Yen Indha Mayamo"	Lalgudi Jayaraman	Solo
2007	Karuppusamy Kuththagaithaarar	"Uppu kallu"	Dhina	Solo
2007	Pachaikili Muthucharam	"Unakkul Naane"	Harris Jayaraj	Chorus
2008	Uliyin Osai	"Abinayam Kaatugindra"	Ilayaraja	Sudha Ragunathan
2008	Dhaam Dhoom	"Yaaro Manadile"	Harris Jayaraj	Krish
2008	Laadam	"Siru Thoduthalile"	Dharan	Haricharan
2008	Sathyam	"Chellame Chellame"	Harris Jayaraj	Balram, Sunitha Sarathy
2008	Nepali	"Priya Ithu Sitout"	Srikanth Deva	Karthik, Savitha
2008	Ennai Theriyuma	"Enna Matramo"	Achu	Karthik
2009	Modhi Vilayadu	"Paadhi Kaadhal"	Hariharan, Lesle Lewis	Sunitha Sarathy
2009	Unnaipol Oruvan	"Nilai Varuma"	Shruthi Hassan	Kamal Haasan
2009	Vedigundu Murugesan	"Neenda Thooram[Female Version]"	Dhina	Solo
2009	Eesa	"Orumurai Nee Paarthal"	Haran	Harish Raghavendra
2009	Eesa	"Orumurai Nee Paarthal 2"	Haran	Harish Raghavendra
2009	Anthony Yaar?	"Kana Ondru Kanden"	Dhina	Shankar Mahadevan
2009	Renigunta	"Vizhigalile"	Ganesh Raghavendra	Solo

==== 2010s ====
Year	Movie	Song title	Music director	Co-singers
2010	Irumbukkottai Murattu Singam	"Kanna Nee"	G. V. Prakash Kumar	Naveen Iyer, D. A. Srinivas
2010	Thittakudi	"Nenjukulle"	Selva Nambi	Selva Nambi
2010	Aayirathil Oruvan	"Pemmane"	G. V. Prakash Kumar	P. B. Sreenivas
2011	Ko	"Venpaniye"	Harris Jayaraj	Sriram Parthasarathy
2012	Life of Pi	"Pi's Lullaby"	Mychael Danna	Solo
2012	Thuppakki	"Vennilave"	Harris Jayaraj	Hariharan
2012	Maalai Pozhudhin Mayakathilaey	"Yen Uyire"(Unplugged)	Achu	Solo
2012	Soozhnilai	"Otrai Viralal"	Dhina	Solo
2012	Vinmeengal	"Ariya Paruvathil"	Jubin	Rahul Nambiar
2012	Eppadi Manasukkul Vanthai	"Muthangal"	A. J. Daniel	Unni Menon, Jai Geetha
2012	Ithanai Naalai Engirunthai	"Neeradinom"	Dhina	Solo
2012	Dhik Dhik	"Uyir Ezuthae"	D. Imman	
2014	Yaan	"Nee Vandhu Ponadhu"	Harris Jayaraj	KK, Ramya NSK
2014	Nannbenda	"Oorellaam Unnai Kandu"	Harris Jayaraj	Unni Krishnan
2014	Ninaivil Nindraval	"Kalvane En Kalvane"	D. Imman	Sricharan
2016	Theri	"Thaimai"	G. V. Prakash Kumar	Solo
2016	Veera Sivaji	"Thavazhnthidum Thangapoove"	D. Imman	Solo
2017	Vanamagan	"Yemma Yea Alagamma"	Harris Jayaraj	Haricharan
2017	Indrajith	"Semparuthi"	KP	Solo
2019	Sarvam Thaala Mayam	"Maakela Vicharamu"	Tyagaraja (Recreated by A. R. Rahman)	
2019	Enai Noki Paayum Thota	"Poi Vavaraa"	Darbuka Siva	
2019	Enai Noki Paayum Thota	"Hey Nijame"	Darbuka Siva	
2019	Mamangam	"Lullaby"	M. Jayachandran	
2019	Dhanusu Raasi Neyargale	"Murada Murada"	Ghibran	

==== 2020s ====
Year	Film	Song	Composer(s)	Co-artist(s)
2020	Putham Pudhu Kaalai	"Kanna Thoodhu"	Govind Vasantha	
2020	Paava Kadhaigal	"Kanne Naan Un"	Karthik	
2021	Netrikann	"Idhuvum Kadandhu Pogum" (Reprise)	Girishh Gopalakrishnan	
2021	Mudhal Nee Mudivum Nee	"Nee Koadugal"	Darbuka Siva	
2021	Enna Solla Pogirai	"Aasai"(Reprise)	Vivek–Mervin	
2022	Hey Sinamika	"Yasissaikka"	Govind Vasantha	
2022	The Legend	"Maayakaari"	Harris Jayaraj	Unni Menon
2022	Veetla Vishesham	"Family Paattu"	Girish Gopalakrishnan	Ramnath, Jairam Balasubramaniam
2024	Kannagi	"Mother's Lullaby"	Shaan Rahman	

=== Telugu songs ===
Year	Movie	Song title	Music director	Co-singers
1997	Iddaru	"Sasivadane"	A. R. Rahman	Unni Krishnan
1998	Priyuralu	"Raani Lalitha Priyanaadham"	Ilaiyaraaja	K. S. Chithra, mano
2001	Cheli	"Manohara"	Harris Jayaraj	
2001	Majunu	"Tholivalapaa"	Harris Jayaraj	Harish Raghavendra
2002	Sreeram	"Tiya Tiyani Kalalanu"	R. P. Patnaik	
2004	Morning Raga	"Mahaganapatim"	Mani Sharma/Amit Heri	
2004	Morning Raga	"Mahaganapatim Jam"	Mani Sharma/Amit Heri	
2004	Morning Raga	"Jagada Dharana"(Kannada)	Mani Sharma/Amit Heri	Nandini Srikar
2005	Ghajini	"Hrudayam Ekkadunnadi"	Harris Jayaraj	Harish Raghavendra
2005	Premikulu	"Aamani Koyilanai"	Sajan Madhav	Solo
2006	Amma Cheppindi	"Evaere Maina Anani"	M. M. Keeravani	Solo
2006	Amma Cheppindi	"Yentho Dooram"(Bit Version)	M. M. Keeravani	Solo
2006	Jalakanta	"Ulike O Chilake"	Harris Jayaraj	Karthik
2006	Raghavan	"Banam Vesade" (Audio Version)	Harris Jayaraj	Harish Raghavendra
2006	Raghavan	"Maya Modalaye"(Film Version)	Harris Jayaraj	Harish Raghavendra
2008	16 Days	"Anti Pettukundhuna"	Dharan	Haricharan
2008	Nenu Meeku Telusa	"Enduko Madi"	Achu	Hemachandra
2008	Salute	"Muddula Muddula"	Harris Jayaraj	Balram, Sunitha Sarathy
2009	Eeenadu	"Eenaadu Ee Samaram"	Shruthi Hassan	Kamal Haasan
2011	Rangam	"Ee Manchullo"	Harris Jayaraj	Sriram Parthasarathy
2012	Thuppakki	"Vennelave"	Harris Jayaraj	Hariharan
2013	Intinta Annamayya	"Kamalaasana"	M. M. Keeravani	
2015	Nene	"Ninninka Chudavu"	Harris Jayaraj	Karthik, Ramya NSK
2016	Drushya Kavyam	"Naanati Bratuku Natakamu"	Pranam kamalakr	
2016	Policeodu	"Neela Kannula"	G. V. Prakash Kumar	
2018	Saakshyam	"Shivam Shivam"	Harshavardhan Rameshwar	
2018	Saakshyam	"Thatra Ganda"	Harshavardhan Rameshwar	
2019	Sarvam Thaala Mayam	"Maakelara Vichaaramu"	A. R. Rahman	
2019	Dear Comrade	"O Kalala Kathala"(Reprise)	Justin Prabhakaran	Vijay Yesudas
2019	Mamangam	"Laali Paata"	M. Jayachandran	
2022	Masooda	"Daachi Daachi"(Female)	Prashanth R Vihari	

=== Kannada Songs ===
Year	Movie	Song title	Music director	Co-singers
2003	Excuse Me	"Preethse Antha Prana"	R. P. Patnaik	Solo
2005	Deadly Soma	"Usire Usire"	Sadhu Kokila	Karthik
2006	Jothe Jotheyali	"Summane Summane"	Harikrishna	Solo
2007	Right Adhre	"Manaseega Maathanna"	Neel	Solo
2009	Meghave Meghave	"Huduga Huduga"	Harikrishna	Solo
2009	Karanji	"Ee Thampu Gali"	Veer Samarth	Hariharan, Fayaz Khan, Kushala
2010	Janani	"Suvvali Suvvalali"	Asif Ali	Unni Krishnan

=== Malayalam Songs ===
Year	Movie	Song title	Music director	Co-singers
1992	Kudumbasametham	"Kamalambike"	Johnson	K. J. Yesudas
1992	Kudumbasametham	"Paahimaam"	Johnson	K. J. Yesudas
1992	Kudumbasametham	"Jagadaananda"	Johnson	Neyveli Santhanagopalan, Sreemathi Bindra, Sreemathi Soundaram Krishnan
1993	Paithrukam	"Neelanjanapoovin"	S.P.Venkitesh	Solo
2002	Mitr, My Friend	"Kuzhaloothi Manamellam"	Bhavatharini	Solo
2005	Daivanamathil	"Tanha Tanha"	Pravin Mani	Solo
2007	Ore Kadal	"Pranaya Sandhya Oru"	Ousepachan	Solo
2011	Indian Rupee	"Vaishnav Jan To"	Shahabaz Aman	Solo
2014	Peruchazhi	"Enthu Cheyyan"	Arrora	Solo
2016	Kambhoji	"Anguli Sparsham"	M. Jayachandran	Solo
2016	Kambhoji	"Irakkam Varaamal"	M. Jayachandran	Solo
2018	Neeli	"En Anpe"	Sharreth Vasudevan	Solo
2019	Kolaambi	"Ororo Novin"	Ramesh Narayan	Solo
2019	Mamangam	"Lullaby"	M. Jayachandran	Solo
2021	Backpackers	"Omanathinkal Kidavo"	Sachin Shankor Mannath	
2022	Oruthee	"Kannuneeraal Avil Ketty"	Gopi Sundar	
2022	Lalitham Sundaram	"Nerthu Veena Manjilundaam"	Bijibal	
2022	Lalitham Sundaram	"Melle Thodanu Narumanam"	Bijibal	

=== Hindi songs ===
Year	Movie	Song title	Music director	Co-singers
2001	Rehnaa Hai Terre Dil Mein	"Zara Zara"	Harris Jayaraj	Solo
2004	Phir Milenge	"Khul Ke Muskurale"	Shankar–Ehsaan–Loy	Solo
2006	The Smart Hunt	"Pyar Hota Ayaeka"	Harris Jayaraj	Srinivas
2011	Force	"Chahoon Bhi toh"	Harris Jayaraj	Karthik
2015	Baahubali: The Beginning	"Mamta Se Bhari"	M. M. Keeravani	Solo
2015	Baahubali: The Beginning	"Swapn Sunehere"	M. M. Keeravani	Swetha Raj
2019	Mamangam	"Lullaby"	M. Jayachandran	

=== Lyricist ===
Year	Movie	Song title	Music director
2024	Varshangalkku Shesham	"Nyabagam"	Amrit Ramnath
