= Laadam =

- Release poster
- Directed by: Prabhu Solomon
- Written by: Prabhu Solomon
- Produced by: Ponnurangam
- Starring: Arun Joghee; Charmy Kaur; Kota Srinivasa Rao; Jayaprakash; Dheeraj; Manorama
- Cinematography: M. Sukumar
- Edited by: Suresh Urs
- Music by: Dharan
- Distributed by: Cosmos Entertainment
- Release date: 20 February 2009
- Country: India
- Language: Tamil

Laadam (transl. Horseshoe) is a 2009 Indian Tamil-language gangster thriller film written and directed by Prabhu Solomon and produced by Ponnurangam. The film stars debutant Arun Joghee and Charmy Kaur, while Kota Srinivasa Rao, Jayaprakash, Dheeraj Kher and Manorama play supporting roles. The music was composed by Dharan. This film is loosely based on the 2006 crime thriller film Lucky Number Slevin. The film was released on 20 February 2009. Upon release, the film was dubbed into Telugu as 16 Days with Dharmavarapu Subrahmanyam and Ramjagan replacing Chitti Babu and Lollu Sabha Manohar, respectively.

== Plot ==
The story begins with Kunjidhapadam, who comes from a small place to the city for an interview. He manages to find a place to stay with his distant relative Subramanyam, who is actually a defaulter on loans taken on interest. He is absconding but then leaves his key at a secret place. Kunjidhapadam takes the key and stays, and he also manages to get a job. On the other hand, Angel grows as an orphan and works with a mineral water company. She does not have a place to stay so she locates those houses without occupants, stays there for a night, and gets going in the morning. One such instance gets her to Kunjidhapadam's house. All this apart, there are two dons Pavadai and Vembuli, who are out to kill each other. Vembuli is successful in killing Pavadai's son. Pavadai vows to kill Vembuli's son by the twelfth day ceremony of his son.

A twist of fate occurs, and Pavadai's goons mistake Kunjidhapadam to be Subrahmanyam and get him to take money. Kunjidhapadam gives an idea to kill Vembuli's son and is given a 16-day deadline to do so; else, Pavadai threatens to kill him. Vembuli learns of this and tries to kill Kunjidhapadam, but he comes alive. After that, Kunjidhapadam again meets Angel and tries to get money from her to give it back to Pavadai, which Subramanyam has to give. At that time, Pavadai realizes and confirms that Kunjidhapadam has to kill Vembuli's son. On the way back, he meets the opposite gangsters and tries to escape from them. The gangsters get his files, which contain his degree certificate. After that, he meets Angel and returns her money, which Pavadai returned with double of the amount and a gun. He meets Angel, and both plan to stay in actor Vadivelu's house/Sunil's house (in the Telugu dubbed version).

After that, both Kunjithapadam and Angel follow a man working under Vembuli and go inside a restaurant, where Kunjithapadam manages to get information about Vembuli's son, who is hidden in a moving airbus with many securities. Kunjithapadam is in search of the bus and finds it. After that, he tries to stop the bus and wants to talk with Vembuli's son. He tells him about all the things that happened with Pavadai and asks him to give him a job with security from Pavadai. However, they ordered not to face each other again, or else he will be killed.

Soon after, Kunjithapadam and Angel go to a minister's house to stay at night. They get caught in the morning, but the manage to escape from the minister's gang. A police officer tries to escape them. He brings both of them to the station and mistakenly makes them get married. The police officer brought them to his house because their marriage is the 100th marriage done in the police station. The first night in the house has been arranged. At that time, both Angel and Kunjidhapadam become closer and fall in love.

The next day, Kunjithapadam tries to see Vembuli's son, who is in a small boat. Some of Vembuli's henchmen were playing in the beach and throw Kunjithapadam son into the sea. Kunjithapadam manages to swim and reach the boat, also asking for his degree certificate. Vembuli's henchmen tore all the certificates, and one of the henchmen asks him to send Angel to him for prostitution. Kunjidhapadam got angry kills Vembuli's son and brings his body in a small boat to the beach where all gangsters were playing and kills all of Vembuli's henchmen. After that, he brings the body to Vembuli's house. He then kidnaps Vembuli and Pavadai, keeps both of them tied to a rock area, and murders them. Despite their doubts, the police decide to ignore the case because it managed to finish off two wanted criminals, and close it off due to lack of evidence.

Kunjidhapadam reunites with Angel at a railway station, where they both decide to move to Hyderabad to finally live as married couple. An epilogue shows them finding a new home, and eventually starting a family with two children, now living happily together.

== Cast ==
- Arun Joghee as Kunjidhapadam (credited as Aravindhan)
- Charmy Kaur as Angel
- Kota Srinivasa Rao as Pavadai
- Jayaprakash as Vembuli
- Dheeraj as Adithya
- Manorama as Gabriel's mother
- Jasper
- Chitti Babu as SI Gabriel
- Nellai Siva
- Lollu Sabha Manohar as Constable
- Vasu Vikram
- Munnar Ramesh as Vembuli's henchman
- Vidharth as Vembuli's henchman
- George Maryan as Pavadai's henchman
- Cheranraj
- Kunal Shah (guest appearance)

== Production ==
Charmy Kaur took Tamil lessons to become fluent in the language prior to the film, and she also underwent training in motorcycle riding for her role. Soon after the launch of the film, the original producers, Chozha Creations, sold their stake in the film to Cosmos Entertainment. To capitulate on Charmy's popularity in Andhra Pradesh, a Telugu version has been readied to be released shortly after the release of the original.

The film in October 2008, faced a high court order staying its release. The petition against the movie was filed by Ponnurangan on behalf of Chozha Creations, giving an issue is one of financial settlement between Chozha Creations and Cosmos Enterprises, the producers of Laadam. In the petition, it has been said that Laadam was being initially produced by Chozha Creations. But, midway through the making, the movie was sold outright to Cosmos Enterprises for a sum of Rs. 90 lakhs as per an agreement reached in June. But, Chozha Creations claims to have received only Rs. 40 lakhs to date and have thus filed the petition. In the interim, Laadam has been completed and is ready for release. But this stay order might now delay or even worse, prevent its release. The high court has given a period of two weeks for Cosmos Enterprises to file an explanation.

== Soundtrack ==
From the music composed by Dharan, two songs have been recorded, one each by Dr. Burn and Emcee Jezz, both rappers of the Malaysian-based band Natchatra.

Laadam

Soundtrack album by Dharan
- Released: 9 January 2009
- Genre: Feature film soundtrack
- Label: Sony Music India

Dharan chronology
Sivi (2007)	Laadam (2009)	Siddu +2 (2009)

- "Siru Thoduthalile" – Bombay Jayashree, Haricharan
- "Makkah" – Benny Dayal, Haricharan
- "Atlantic Ocean" – Suchitra
- "Gangster" – Dr. Burn, Benny Dayal

== Reception ==
Behindwoods wrote "Although Prabhu Solomon’s earnest attempt at making a spooky thriller is evident, the predictable plot and screenplay prove to be a let down." Rediff wrote "Laadam might have a few minor loop-holes but Prabhu Solomon's script (even if it's been liberally borrowed from abroad) puts up a good show."
