= Azhagiya Asura =

2006 Indian film

- Directed by: Nagu
- Produced by: Ravi Jeyram
- Starring: Yogi; Regina Cassandra
- Cinematography: Raja Saravanan
- Edited by: Anil Malnad
- Music by: Brahma
- Production company: Jeyram Creations
- Release date: 22 December 2006
- Country: India
- Language: Tamil

Azhagiya Asura (transl. Beautiful Demon) is a 2006 Indian Tamil-language romantic comedy film written and directed by Nagu. The film stars Yogi, Regina Cassandra and Nanditha Jennifer, while Krishna, Krish, Sampath Raj, and Vaiyapuri play supporting roles. Featuring music composed by Brahma, the film was released on 22 December 2006. The film's title was taken from a song from Whistle (2003).

== Plot synopsis ==
Guna unites his brother and his lover after overcoming a number of problems. But when he falls in love with a girl who does not reciprocate his feelings, his brother's wife comes to his aid.

== Cast ==
- Yogi as Guna
- Regina Cassandra as Mahalakshmi
- Nanditha Jennifer as Pavithra
- Krishna as Sanjay
- Krish as Guna's friend
- Shyam as Guna's friend
- Venkat as Guna's friend
- Vijay as Guna's friend
- Pooja as Guna's friend
- Sampath Raj as Mohan
- Vaiyapuri
- Manikka Vinayagam as Guna and Mohan's father
- Muthukaalai

== Production ==
The film had earlier developed under the title Idiot, before the team opted for Azhagiya Asura. Yogi, grandson of veteran actor Thengai Srinivasan, and Regina Cassandra, who earlier appeared as Laila's sister in Kanda Naal Mudhal (2005) made their debuts as lead actors with this film. Regina worked on the film alongside her commitments as a student at Lady Andal school.

Production began for the film in May 2006. A scheduled shoot in Thailand was delayed because Regina and her mother had passport issues, before later being cancelled as a result of the 2006 Thai coup d'état.

== Soundtrack ==
Soundtrack was composed by debutant Brahma.

- "Dum Dum Taka" — Malathi, Ranjith
- "Pondy Bazaar" — Tippu
- "Eppadi Eppadi" — Harish Raghavendra
- "Uyire Ushe" — Krish
- "Sutrum Bhoomi" — Ranjith

== Release ==
A reviewer from ChennaiOnline.com wrote "Azhagiya Asura is a wholesome, engaging entertainer, a commendable effort from first-timers producer Ravi Jeyram and director Nagu". Lajjaavathi of Kalki wrote the director aimed to make a romantic film which thankfully did not end up as silly but called the predictability of scenes as drawback and scenes felt dragged but praised music and cinematography.

Despite its low-key release at the time, the film has belatedly been recognised as the lead debut of South-Indian actress Regina Cassandra.
