= The Thriller =

- Theatrical release poster
- Directed by: B. Unnikrishnan
- Written by: B. Unnikrishnan
- Based on: Murder Case of Paul Muthoot George
- Produced by: Sabu Cherian
- Starring: Prithviraj Sukumaran; Siddique; Lalu Alex; Catherine Tresa; Prajin; Mallika Kapoor; Sampath Raj
- Cinematography: Bharani K. Dharan
- Edited by: Manoj
- Music by: Dharan Kumar
- Production company: Ananda Bhairavi
- Release date: 17 November 2010
- Country: India
- Language: Malayalam

The Thriller is a 2010 Indian Malayalam-language crime thriller film written and directed by B. Unnikrishnan. It stars Prithviraj Sukumaran, Catherine Tresa, Siddique, Lalu Alex, Prajin, Mallika Kapoor, and Sampath Raj in pivotal roles. It was released on 17 November. Later on, it was dubbed in Hindi under the same title. The film is based on the murder case of renowned banker Paul Muthoot, who was murdered in 2009.

== Plot ==
DCP Niranjan, a furious police officer, is assigned to investigate the murder case of prominent businessman Simon Palathungal (based on Paul Muthoot), which formed the headlines in the Kerala media for more than three months. The case had attracted attention for its mysterious planning and execution. Through this investigation, Niranjan finds out that a big crime racket is behind Simon's murder. Niranjan also has enmity with Martin Dinakar, a Dubai-based gold smuggler who is Simon's rival enemy and a headache in Niranjan's investigation. The rest of the film shows how Niranjan tries to bring the real culprit of the murder case.

== Cast ==
- Prithviraj Sukumaran as DCP Niranjan IPS
- Siddique as Ex-ADGP Balagopal IPS
- Lalu Alex as IG Thomas George IPS
- Catherine Tresa as Meera, Niranjan's girlfriend
- Prajin as Simon Joseph Palathungal (character based on Paul Muthoot George)
- Mallika Kapoor as Meghna Gupta, Simon's fiancée
- Sampath Raj as Martin Dinakar
- Vincent Asokan as RDX Anil
- Anand as DIG Manmohan IPS, City Police Commissioner
- P. Sreekumar as ACP Shihabudeen IPS
- Subair as CI Alex
- Vijayaraghavan as Ex-Sub Inspector Sadhasivan, Niranjan's father
- Riyaz Khan as Paramada Subhash
- M. R. Gopakumar as Adv.Uthaman Pillai, Meera's uncle
- Uma as Meera's mother
- Kollam Thulasi as Narayanan, Home Minister of Kerala
- Shivaji Guruvayoor as DGP Mathew Eapen IPS
- Tosh Christy as Joshua
- Dinesh Panicker as Joseph Palathungal, Simon's father
- Kishor Satya as Jacob Joseph Palathungal, Simon's brother
- Mamta Mohandas as the dancer (special appearance)
- V. K. Baiju as SI Philipose
- Sasi Kalinga as ASI Shivarajan
- Pawan as Udayabhanu

== Production ==
Prithviraj stars in "The Thriller". Katherine, Mallika Kapoor and Sampath Raj are in the film as well.

The first schedule of The Thriller takes place in and around Thiruvananthapuram, Kovalam, and Vizhinjam. The second schedule is likely to take place in a foreign country.

== Soundtrack ==
The soundtrack and score were composed by Dharan Kumar, who made his Malayalam debut through this film. The film also marks his second collaboration with Prithviraj after Parijatham (2006), which also marked Dharan's debut as a composer.

No.	Title	Singer(s)	Length
1.	"Priyankari"	Haricharan, Mamta Mohandas
2.	"Thriller Thriller"	Prithivraj, Sunitha Parthasarathy
3.	"Mizhiyil"	Ranjith, Benny Dayal, SuVi
4.	"Priyakari"	Benny Dayal, Haricharan, Mamta Mohandas
5.	"Orma Than Nilave"	Alphons Joseph, Shweta Mohan
