= Tej Charanraj =

Indian actor

- Born: Chennai, Tamil Nadu
- Other name: Tejraj
- Occupation: Actor
- Years active: 2017–present

Tej Charanraj is an Indian actor and film producer who has appeared in Tamil and Kannada language films. After making his film debut in the Tamil film Laali (2017), he has been in films including 90 ML (2019) and Sivi 2 (2022).

== Career ==
Tej is the son of actor-director Charan Raj. His younger brother, Dev Charanraj, is also an actor. He pursued a degree in visual communications, took an acting course at Balu Mahendra’s acting school Cinema Pattarai, learned stunts from action choreographer Pandian and dance from choreographers Raghuram and Sridhar, before embarking in his career as an actor.

In August 2013, Charan Raj revealed that Teja would shortly make his debut as an actor, but there was an eventual delay before he starred in his first film. Tej made his acting debut through the Tamil film, Laali (2017), a drama around parental relationships. For the film's soundtrack release, Charan Raj requested his former co-star Rajinikanth to be the chief guest. He then appeared in a supporting role in Anita Udeep's female-centric drama 90 ML (2019). Tej made his first appearance in Kannada through Shri Bharatha Baahubali (2020).

== Filmography ==
| Year | Film | Role | Language | Notes |
|---|---|---|---|---|
| 2017 | Laali | | Tamil | |
| 2019 | 90 ML | Sathish | Tamil | |
| 2020 | Shri Bharatha Baahubali | | Kannada | |
| 2022 | Sivi 2 | Krish | Tamil | |
| 2023 | Narakasura | Aadhi Naidu | Telugu | |
| 2024 | Vallavan Vaguthadhada | Chiranjeevi | Tamil | |
