= Virattu =

2014 Indian film by Kumar T

- Theatrical poster
- Directed by: Kumar T
- Written by: Kumar T
- Produced by: Kumar T
- Starring: Sujiv; Erica Fernandes
- Cinematography: K. Prasad
- Edited by: S. Karthik
- Music by: Dharan Kumar
- Production company: White Candy Entertainment
- Release date: 21 March 2014
- Country: India
- Language: Tamil

Virattu (transl. Scare) is a 2014 Indian Tamil-language thriller film produced and directed by Kumar T. The film stars T Kumar's son Sujiv and Erica Fernandes, while Pragya Jaiswal and Manobala appear in other pivotal roles. The film was released on 21 February 2014 to average reviews, while the dubbed Telugu version Dega was released on 28 November 2014.

== Cast ==
- Sujiv as Sujiv
- Erica Fernandes as Sri
- Amit Tiwari as Kalki
- Pragya Jaiswal as Mavi
- Manobala
- Suman Setty
- Shankar Melkote

== Production ==
Sequences were filmed on a train travelling from Thailand to Malaysia and the stunt scenes were composed by Dho Dho of Thailand and Williams of Malaysia. Further scenes were canned in New Zealand.

== Music ==
Virattu

Soundtrack album by Dharan Kumar
- Released: 25 June 2013
- Genre: Feature film soundtrack
- Language: Tamil
- Label: Sony Music India
- Producer: Dharan Kumar

Dharan Kumar chronology
Podaa Podi (2012)	Virattu (2013)	Endrendrum (2013)

The film's audio was released in June 2013 by R. B. Choudary, while S. J. Surya received the first copy at a launch event. The film has four songs with four different lyricists contributing – Madhan Karky, Na. Muthukumar, Vignesh Shivan and Lallu. The film's soundtrack opened to average reviews, with a music critic noting it was as "mercurial as its composer". The song "Podhum Podhum" was released with a promotional video featuring the lead singers Andrea Jeremiah and Naresh Iyer and was well received by critics.

Track listing
No.	Title	Lyrics	Singer(s)	Length
1.	"Mouname Mouname"	Na. Muthukumar	Andrea Jeremiah, Haricharan	5:18
2.	"En Life In Angel"	Vignesh Shivan	Dharan Kumar	4:50
3.	"Meeta Paanu"	Lallu	M. M. Manasi, Santhosh Hariharan	5:01
4.	"Podhum Podhum"	Madhan Karky	Andrea Jeremiah, Naresh Iyer	5:06

== Release and reception ==
The film opened on 21 March 2014 to mixed reviews.
