= Vignesh Shivan =

Indian film director and screenwriter (born 1985)

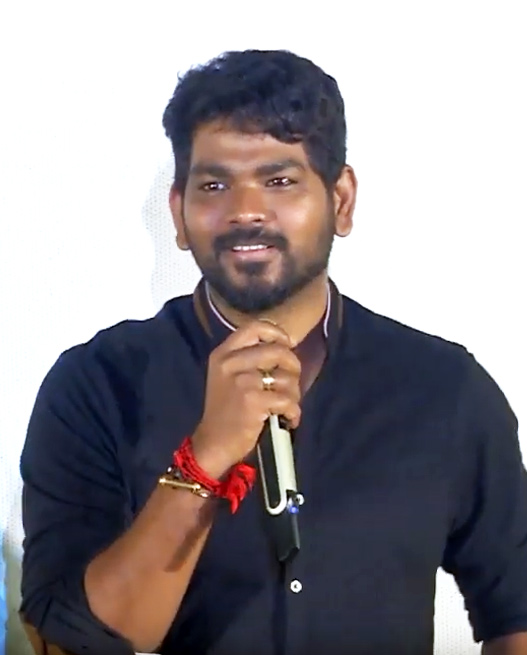
- Vignesh Shivan in 2019
- Born: 18 September 1985 (age 41)
- Occupations: Film director; film producer; screenwriter; lyricist; actor
- Years active: 2012–present
- Spouse: Nayanthara (m. 2022)
- Children: 2

Vignesh Shivan (born 18 September 1985) is an Indian film director, producer, screenwriter, lyricist and actor who works in Tamil cinema.

== Personal life ==
Vignesh's mother was a police inspector, while his father was Superintendent of Police. Vignesh and actress Nayanthara had been in a relationship ever since they worked together on Naanum Rowdy Dhaan in 2015. They announced their engagement in 2021, and got married on 9 June 2022 at Sheraton Grand in Mahabalipuram. The couple had twin boys on 26 September 2022 through surrogacy. Netflix has documented his wife's journey in cinema, as well as her relationship with him, in a documentary titled Nayanthara: Beyond the Fairytale (2024).

== Career ==
Vignesh began his career as an assistant director under Prabhu Solomon. After getting Dharan to compose music for it, showed the film to producers, Gemini Film Circuit, and then to Silambarasan and both parties agreed to collaborate to make it a feature film titled Podaa Podi (2012). The joint producers of the film, Shanaya Telefilms, released a series of posters in June 2008 publicising the film, while Silambarasan and Vignesh toured in Canada scouting for locations and agreeing a deal with Mayor Ron Stevens to film in Orillia and Toronto. The film languished in production for close to four years, before finally releasing in October 2012 to mixed reviews. He then continued to be active in films by working as a lyricist, filming independent music videos and appeared in a cameo role in Velaiyilla Pattathari (2014), starring Dhanush. His second film, Naanum Rowdy Dhaan, released three years after his directorial debut, became his first major breakthrough as a director. In his third venture, Thaanaa Serndha Koottam, he teamed up with Suriya and Keerthy Suresh. Anirudh Ravichander wrote the music numbers. Vignesh Shivan along with Nayanthara, founded a new venture called Rowdy Pictures which produced the films Pebbles (2021) and Rocky (2021). In 2022, the romantic comedy film Kaathuvaakula Rendu Kaadhal starring Vijay Sethupathi, Nayanthara and Samantha was released to mixed reviews. In 2026, the science fiction romantic comedy film, Love Insurance Kompany was a disappointment.

== Filmography ==
Key
†	Denotes films that have not yet been released

=== As director ===
Year	Film	Notes	Ref.
2012	Podaa Podi		
2015	Naanum Rowdy Dhaan	SIIMA Award for Best Director – Tamil	
2018	Thaanaa Serndha Koottam		
2020	Paava Kadhaigal	Anthology film; segment Love Panna Uttarnum	
2022	Kaathuvaakula Rendu Kaadhal	Also producer	
2026	Love Insurance Kompany	Also writer	

=== As an actor ===
Year	Title	Role	Notes
2007	Sivi	Krishna's friend	Uncredited appearance
2012	Podaa Podi	Himself	Cameo appearance
2014	Velaiilla Pattadhari	Vignesh	
2026	Love Insurance Kompany	Himself	Cameo appearance

=== As producer ===
List of produced films
Year	Title	Notes	Ref.
2021	Netrikann		
2021	Koozhangal	Alternatively titled Pebbles	
2021	Rocky	Also distributor	
2022	Kaathuvaakula Rendu Kaadhal	Also director	
2022	Connect		
2023	Shubh Yatra	Gujarati film; remake of Aandavan Kattalai (2016)	
2026	Hi		
2026	Mookuthi Amman 2		

=== As lyricist ===
Year	Song	Film	Composer	Notes
2012	"Hare Rama Hare Krishna"	Podaa Podi	Dharan Kumar	
2012	"Maattikittenae"	Podaa Podi	Dharan Kumar	
2012	"Un Paarvaiyilae"	Podaa Podi	Dharan Kumar	
2013	"Engadi Poranthae"	Vanakkam Chennai	Anirudh Ravichander	
2013	"En Life In Angel"	Virattu	Dharan Kumar	
2014	"Chancey Illa"		Anirudh Ravichander	Single For Madras Day
2015	"Adharru Adharru"	Yennai Arindhaal	Harris Jayaraj	
2015	"Enakenna Yaarum Illaye"	Aakko	Anirudh Ravichander	Single for Valentines Day
2015	"Thappa Dhaan Theriyum"	Maari	Anirudh Ravichander	
2015	"Thangamey"	Naanum Rowdydhaan	Anirudh Ravichander	
2015	"Yennai Maatrum Kadhale"	Naanum Rowdydhaan	Anirudh Ravichander	
2015	"Kannaana Kanne"	Naanum Rowdydhaan	Anirudh Ravichander	
2015	"Varava Varava"	Naanum Rowdydhaan	Anirudh Ravichander	
2016	"Avalukena"	Avalukena (Independent Album)	Anirudh Ravichander	Single for Valentines Day
2016	"Senjitaley"	Remo	Anirudh Ravichander	
2016	"Remo Nee Kadhalan"	Remo	Anirudh Ravichander	
2016	"Sirikkadhey"	Remo	Anirudh Ravichander	
2016	"Tamilselvi"	Remo	Anirudh Ravichander	
2016	"Showkali"	Achcham Yenbadhu Madamaiyada	A R Rahman	
2016	"Solli Tholaiyen Ma"	Yaakkai	Yuvan Shankar Raja	
2017	"Onnume Aagale"	Onnume Aagale (Independent Album)	Anirudh Ravichander	Single for Valentines Day
2017	"Karuppu Vellai"	Vikram Vedha	Sam CS	
2017	"Unakkaga"	Sakka Podu Podu Raja	Silambarasan	
2018	"Naana Thaanaa"	Thaanaa Serndha Koottam	Anirudh Ravichander	
2018	"Sodakku"	Thaanaa Serndha Koottam	Anirudh Ravichander	Written along with Mani Amudhavan
2018	"Peela Peela"	Thaanaa Serndha Koottam	Anirudh Ravichander	
2018	"Thaanaa Serndha Koottam"	Thaanaa Serndha Koottam	Anirudh Ravichander	
2018	"Julie"	Julie (Independent Album)	Anirudh Ravichander	Single for Valentines Day
2018	"Orey Oru"	Kolamavu Kokila	Anirudh Ravichander	
2018	"Gun-in-Kadhal"	Kolamavu Kokila	Anirudh Ravichander	
2018	"Thittam Poda Teriyalayae"	Kolamavu Kokila	Anirudh Ravichander	
2018	"Angry Bird"	Irumbu Thirai	Yuvan Shankar Raja	
2019	"Thimiru Kaatadha Di"	LKG	Leon James	
2019	"Marakkavillayae"	Jersey (D)	Anirudh Ravichander	Tamil version
2019	"Bad Boy"	Saaho (D)	Badshah	Tamil version
2019	"Thimiranumda"	NGK	Yuvan Shankar Raja	
2019	"Yenga Annan"	Namma Veetu Pillai	D. Imman	
2020	"Ennai Vittu"	Kannum Kannum Kollaiyadithaal	Masala Coffee	
2020	"Unnale Penne"	Dharala Prabhu	Inno Genga	
2020	"Dharala Prabhu"	Dharala Prabhu	Anirudh Ravichander	Composed along with Sean Roldan, Vivek-Mervin, Inno Genga, Madley Blues, Bharath Shankar, Kaber Vasuki and Oorka.
2021	"Top Tucker"	Top Tucker (Independent Album)	Yuvan Shankar Raja	Written along with Badshah
2021	"Andha Kanna Paathaakka"	Master	Anirudh Ravichander	
2021	"Quit Pannuda"	Master	Anirudh Ravichander	
2022	"Naanga Vera Maari"	Valimai	Yuvan Shankar Raja	
2022	"Mother Song (Version 1)"	Valimai	Yuvan Shankar Raja	
2022	"Mother Song (Version 2)"	Valimai	Yuvan Shankar Raja	
2022	"Rendu Kaadhal"	Kaathuvaakula Rendu Kaadhal	Anirudh Ravichander	
2022	"Two Two Two"	Kaathuvaakula Rendu Kaadhal	Anirudh Ravichander	
2022	"Naan Pizhai"	Kaathuvaakula Rendu Kaadhal	Anirudh Ravichander	
2022	"Dippam Dappam"	Kaathuvaakula Rendu Kaadhal	Anirudh Ravichander	
2022	"Kaathuvaakula Rendu Kaadhal"	Kaathuvaakula Rendu Kaadhal	Anirudh Ravichander	
2022	"Vaada Thambi"	Etharkkum Thunindhavan	D. Imman	
2022	"Bae"	Don	Anirudh Ravichander	
2023	"Rathamaarey"	Jailer	Anirudh Ravichander	SIIMA Award for Best Lyricist
2024	"Hey Love"	Joshua: Imai Pol Kaakha	Karthik	
2024	"Naan Un Joshua"	Joshua: Imai Pol Kaakha	Karthik	
2024	"Kulukku Kulukku"	Inga Naan Thaan Kingu	D. Imman	
2024	"Paththavaikkum"	Devara: Part 1 (D)	Anirudh Ravichander	Tamil version
2024	"Daavudi"	Devara: Part 1 (D)	Anirudh Ravichander	Tamil version
2025	"Nesippaya Nee Ennai"	Nesippaya	Yuvan Shankar Raja	
2025	"Rise of Dragon"	Dragon	Leon James	
2025	"Vazhithunaiye"	Dragon	Leon James	Co-wrote with Ko Sesha
2025	"Idhayam Ulle Vaa''	Kingdom (D)	Anirudh Ravichander	Tamil version
2025	"Vazhiyiraen"	Madharaasi	Anirudh Ravichander	
2026	"Dheema"	Love Insurance Kompany	Anirudh Ravichander	
2026	"Pattuma"	Love Insurance Kompany	Anirudh Ravichander	
2026	"Enakena Yaarum Illaye"	Love Insurance Kompany	Anirudh Ravichander	
2026	"Adaavadi"	Love Insurance Kompany	Anirudh Ravichander	co-written with Rokesh, Heisenberg
2026	"Pookatum"	Love Insurance Kompany	Anirudh Ravichander	
2026	"Vibe Vaasey"	Love Insurance Kompany	Anirudh Ravichander	
2026	"Tabaahi"	Toxic (D)	Vishal Mishra	Tamil version
2026	"Vitupogaadha"	Toxic (D)	Vishal Mishra	Tamil version
2026	"Vitupogaadha (Soul Version)"	Toxic (D)	Vishal Mishra	Tamil version
2026	"Oh Raya"	Toxic (D)	Vishal Mishra	Tamil version
2026	"Thadumaarudhe"	Toxic (D)	Tanishk Bagchi, Faheem Abdullah, Arslan Nizami	Tamil version
2026	"Netru Ponavai"	Jailer 2	Anirudh Ravichander	Tamil version
TBA	"Don't Know Why"	Magic (D)	Anirudh Ravichander	Tamil version

== Other work ==
=== Music videos ===
Year	Song	Artist(s)	Notes
2012	"The Love Anthem"	Silambarasan	Director
