= Yogi (actor) =

Indian actor

- Born: Swaroop; 8 December; India

Yogi is an Indian actor. He is the grandson of Tamil film actor Thengai Srinivasan.

== Career ==
Yogi made his acting debut in the romantic film Azhagiya Asura opposite then newcomer Regina Cassandra. He got the offer through singer Krish and met the director. His acting was well received with one critic noting that "The confidence with which the debutant essays his role, the ease with which he emotes and expresses the character's various moods, Yogi's work is more like that of a seasoned veteran" and another critic opined that "He has come up trumps playing the lead role. The ease with which he emotes and his dedication to excel on screen promises a bright future for the youth". His next film was the horror film Sivi (2007), which was a remake of the Thai film Shutter (2004). The film released to positive reviews. One critic wrote that "Yogi has performed his role convincingly". He then starred in Sivi 2 (2022) the prequel to Sivi, reprising his character through the use of computer graphics.

== Filmography ==
Year	Film	Role	Notes
2006	Azhagiya Asura	Guna	
2007	Sivi	Krishna	
2022	Sivi 2	Krishna	
