= Vallavan Vaguthadhada =

- Theatrical release poster
- Directed by: Vinayek Durai
- Written by: Vinayek Durai
- Produced by: Vinayek Durai
- Starring: Tej Charanraj; Rajesh Balachandiran; Aananya Mani
- Cinematography: Karthick Nallamuthu
- Edited by: Ajay
- Music by: Sagishna Xavier
- Production company: Focus Studios
- Release date: 19 April 2024
- Country: India
- Language: Tamil

Vallavan Vaguthadhada (transl. It has been ordained by the Almighty) is a 2024 Indian Tamil-language heist film written, produced, and directed by Vinayek Durai. The film stars Tej Charanraj, Rajesh Balachandiran, and Aananya Mani.

== Cast ==
- Tej Charanraj as Chiranjeevi
- Rajesh Balachandiran as Neethimani
- Aananya Mani as Agalya
- Swathi Meenakshi as Subhatra
- Vikram Adhitya as Kuberan
- Regin Rose as Chakkaravarthi

== Soundtrack ==
All lyrics are written by Varuon Thushyanthan.

Track listing
No.	Title	Singer(s)	Length
1.	"Vallavan Vaguthadhada"	Yazin Nizar, Krishna K.	3:58
2.	"Zoosa"	Sagishna Xavier, Flute Charles, Vandana Srinivasan	3:46
Total length:			7:44

== Reception ==
Abhinav Subramanian of The Times of India rated the film 2.5/5 and wrote, "Vallavan Vaghuthadhada suffers from a script that lacks depth and polish. The execution faithfully reflects the script‘s limitations, leaving the audience with a sense of unfulfilled potential. Sreejith Mullappilly of Cinema Express gave the film the same rating and wrote, "Vallavan Vaguthadhada is a fine film that is likely to appeal to all those who like meaningful entertainers that have both a well laid out plot and a climax in which all the knots are neatly tied up". Manigandan KR of Times Now wrote, "Vallavan Vaguthadhada is a fine film that is likely to appeal to all those who like meaningful entertainers that have both a well laid out plot and a climax in which all the knots are neatly tied up".
