= Siddhu +2 =

- Poster
- Directed by: K. Bhagyaraj
- Screenplay by: K. Bhagyaraj
- Story by: Krishna Da Vinci
- Produced by: K. Bhagyaraj
- Starring: Shanthanu Bhagyaraj; Chandini Tamilarasan
- Cinematography: Rasamathi
- Edited by: Subash
- Music by: Dharan; S. Thaman (1 song); Babu Shankar (1 song)
- Production company: KBR Medias
- Distributed by: Moser Baer Entertainment
- Release date: 10 December 2010
- Country: India
- Language: Tamil

Siddhu +2 is a 2010 Indian Tamil-language romantic action comedy film co-written and directed by K. Bhagyaraj, starring his son Shanthanu and newcomer Chandini Tamilarasan in lead roles. The film released on 10 December 2010 and performed averagely at the box office. It was Bhagyaraj's last directorial credit before his death in 2026.

== Plot ==
Siddharth, the son of a school principal, runs away from home after failing in his higher secondary exams. He meets Pavithra, who has likewise failed, and the two travel to Chennai, with Siddhu planning to commit suicide. They eventually fall in love and decide to start a new life. After a host of misadventures, including one where Siddhu crosses paths with a brutal policeman, they discover that Pavithra has passed her exams. When she realises that Siddhu had initially tried to hide this fact from her, she runs back to her house and joins a medical course. Siddhu attempts to win her back, staying in a barbershop owned by a local. There, he has to contend with Pavithra's murderous father, her eccentric uncle who is determined to marry her and a Gujarati woman who falls in love with him. These elements, along with the policeman attempting to kill him in an encounter, come together in the final act to threaten Siddhu and his love life. How Siddhu triumphs forms the rest of story.

== Cast ==
- Shanthnoo Bhagyaraj as Siddharth (Siddhu)
- Chandini Tamilarasan as Pavithra
- Kausha Rach as Kausha
- Ganja Karuppu as Barbershop Owner
- Seetha as Siddhu's mother
- Rajesh as Siddhu's father
- Seema as Paithra's grandmother
- Pragathi as Pavithra's mother
- Anu Mohan
- Avinash as Pavithra's father
- Anirudh as Police Officer
- Manobala as Police Officer
- Nellai Siva as Police Officer
- Muthukaalai as Beggar / Godman
- Alex
- Scissor Manohar
- K. Bhagyaraj (Cameo appearance)
- Senthil (Cameo appearance)
- Thalaivasal Vijay (Cameo appearance)

== Production ==
The film was initially titled Puthiya Vaarpugal (transl. New Mouldings), but later retitled to avoid the misconception that it was a remake of the 1979 film.

== Soundtrack ==
Music is mostly composed by Dharan, teaming up with K. Bhagyaraj for the second time following a successful collaboration in Parijatham (2006). The soundtrack album, which released on 31 October 2010, features six songs, with two of them being composed by Dharan and Babu Shankar, and another two being a remix of "Naan Aalana Thamarai" from Bhagyaraj's Idhu Namma Aalu (1988) and "En Sogakathaiyai" from Thooral Ninnu Pochu (titled as "Kelu Kelu") and one being composed by Thaman. Notably, music composer Yuvan Shankar Raja and film director Venkat Prabhu's had lent their voices for each a song. "Poove Poove" in particular became popular and a chartbuster. Lyrics were penned by Na. Muthukumar, Babu Shankar and Amudhamani.

Track listing
No.	Title	Lyrics	Music	Singer(s)	Length
1.	"Poove Poove"	Na. Muthukumar	Dharan	Yuvan Shankar Raja, Chinmayi	04:33
2.	"Money Money"	Babu Shankar	Babu Shankar	Benny Dayal, Reshmi	03:47
3.	"Kelu Kelu"	Amudhamani	Dharan	Haricharan, Ganja Karuppu, Maniyan, CA. Raja	05:23
4.	"Gundu Chattikkule"	Na. Muthukumar	Thaman	Ranjith, Naveen, Rahul Nambiar	04:49
5.	"Naan Aalana Thamarai"	Amudhamani	Dharan	Suchitra, Srimathumitha, Venkat Prabhu	04:25
6.	"Poove Poove" (remix)	Na. Muthukumar	Dharan	Yuvan Shankar Raja	04:23
Total length:					27:20

== Release ==
The film was initially slated to release on 26 November 2010, and later to January 2011 during Pongal, but eventually released in December 2010. The film was made simultaneously in Telugu as Love in Hyderabad (previously titled Sare Nee Ishtam), directed by Chandra Mahesh and starring Kannada actress Aindrita Ray as the female lead. The film featured music by Chakri. The film also starred Kausha Rach, Brahmanandam, Nagendra Babu, Kota Srinivasa Rao, Sudhakar, Annapoorna, Sudha, Sayaji Shinde (replacing Avinash), Satya Prakash (replacing Saiju Kurup), and Ali. However the film did not face a theatrical release, owing to the failure of the original version.

== Critical reception ==
Sify wrote "the film is painfully predictable, and offers nothing original in its writing or treatment. It just doesn't work because it's hard to empathize with any of the characters and the actors fail to rise above the flawed script". The film was also reviewed by The New Indian Express, The Times of India, and Rediff.com.
