= Sivi 2 =

2022 horror thriller film

- Directed by: K. R. Senthil Nathan
- Produced by: Lalita Kasturi Kannan
- Starring: Tej Charanraj; Swathisha; Yogi; Gayatri Rema
- Music by: F. S. Faizal
- Production company: Tulsi Cine Arts
- Release date: 22 July 2022
- Country: India
- Language: Tamil

Sivi 2 is a 2022 Indian Tamil-language horror film directed by K. R. Senthil Nathan as a sequel to his earlier film, Sivi (2007). The film stars Tej Charanraj, Swathisha, Yogi and Gayatri Rema in the lead roles. A remake of the Korean film Gonjiam: Haunted Asylum (2018) was released on 22 July 2022.

== Cast ==
- Tej Charanraj as Krish
- Swathisha
- Yogi as Krishna
- Gayatri Rema as Maria
- Kristina
- 'Poo' Maila
- Santhish as Bharath
- 'Doomangoli' Kumaran
- Dharmaraj
- Roshan
- Chaams as Khalifa
- Thaadi Balaji as Police officer
- Kothandam as Police officer

== Production ==
Production on the sequel to Sivi (2007) began in early 2021, with director Senthil Nathan and actor Yogi reuniting from the original through the use of computer graphics. The first look poster of the film was released in December 2021. Chaams, who played a small role in Sivi, plays a serious role for the first time in his career.

== Reception ==
The film was released on 22 July 2022 across Tamil Nadu. The critic from The Times of India gave the film a negative review, noting the film "tries too hard to frighten viewers but only ends up as a badly-made horror film with logical loopholes". A critic from Dina Thanthi critic wrote that horror film fans are in for a treat as there are no laughing ghosts.
