= Sivi (film) =

2007 film

- Title card
- Directed by: K. R. Senthil Nathan
- Written by: K. R. Senthil Nathan
- Produced by: K. Sundar
- Starring: Yogi; Jayashree Rao; Anuja Iyer
- Cinematography: P. S. Sanjay
- Edited by: G. Sasikumar
- Music by: Dharan Kumar
- Release date: 21 September 2007
- Country: India
- Language: Tamil

Sivi is a 2007 Indian Tamil-language supernatural horror film directed by K. R. Senthil Nathan and starring Yogi, Jayashri Rao and Anuja Iyer. A remake of the 2004 Thai film Shutter, Sivi was released on 21 September 2007 across theatres in Tamil Nadu.

== Plot ==
The movie begins with Krishna (Yogi) a young photographer, and his girlfriend Sona (Jayashri Rao) accidentally running down a young woman on their drive home after a night's party on a deserted stretch of East Coast Road near Chennai. They decide to leave the dead body and drive away. Later, Krishna discovers something strange when he finds a mysterious shadow that appears on the pictures he takes with his camera. Ever since the accident, Krishna has been experiencing shoulder and neck pains.

He thinks that it is just a bad picture, but then he realises that there is something more sinister behind the shadow on the picture frame and the extremely unsettling dreams. Unable to cope, they start investigating the phenomenon of the ghost appearing on the photographs, which leads to a discovery about Krishna's past, and a possible clue to the identity of their ghostly nemesis. As Sona goes to college and starts taking pictures of the college and the library, Sona had found the girl that was hit on the road and was in the pictures, a young shy girl named Nandhini (Anuja Iyer). Krishna's friends have also committed suicide by jumping off buildings.

A flashback reveals that Krishna had once dated Nandhini, as the relationship ended with Krishna dumping her and Nandhini cutting herself. As she continues to haunt Krishna and Sona, they go and visit her mother, where it is revealed that there is a coffin near the shed with Nandhini's body inside in her mother's house and revealed that she committed suicide and her mother could not bear to cremate the body. Krishna is haunted by the girl and ends up been thrown off a fire escape. Sona realises that Krishna's friends had raped Nandhini and revealed that Krishna had taken photos of the rape, so Sona leaves him. Still haunted by Nandhini, Krishna begins to take pictures around the apartment to find Nandhini, as he throws the camera, the Polaroid takes by itself, as it is revealed that the mysterious neck pains were from Nandhini sitting on his shoulders, as Krishna is thrown off the apartment. Sona visits Krishna; as the door swings, the reflection shows Nandhini still sitting on his shoulders.

== Cast ==
- Yogi as Krishna
- Jayashree Rao as Sona
- Anuja Iyer as Nandhini
- Nizhalgal Ravi
- Funky Shankar as Saravanan
- Chitti Babu as Kathir
- Aarthi as Chitra
- Uma
- Benjamin
- Kili Ramachandran as Photographer
- Vignesh Shivan as Krishna's friend (uncredited)

== Production ==
Sivi is the directorial debut of Senthilnathan, who had apprenticed under S. J. Suryah. The film's story was taken from the 2004 Thai film, Shutter, with Indian elements infused into the script. Vignesh Shivan worked on the film as an assistant director, and also appeared in a supporting role as the lead actor's friend.

== Soundtrack ==
The soundtrack was composed by Dharan Kumar. The then Union Minister G. K. Vasan released the audio cassette of Sivi at a function held in Chennai on 29 July 2007. The soundtrack became critically acclaimed with a reviewer noting that Dharan "has oodles of talent, and he definitely knows the pulse of today's generation". La. Rajkumar wrote lyrics for two of the film's songs, while Dr Burn wrote his own lyrics for his rap portions.

Track listing
No.	Title	Singer(s)	Length
1.	"Theme Music"	Subiksha
2.	"O Nenje"	Benny Dayal, Dr. Burn, Dharan, Swetha
3.	"Maayavi Neeya"	Krish, Haricharan, Shruthi
4.	"Rap Theme"	Bob, Ranjith, Subiksha
5.	"O Nenje" (2)	Benny Dayal, Dr. Burn, Dharan, Swetha
6.	"Neruppum"	Ranjith, Sunitha Sarathy

== Critical reception ==
S.R. Ashok Kumar of The Hindu stated that the "film scares in parts" and that "Yogi has performed his role convincingly, while Jayasri Rao needs to improve" and that "Anuja Iyer as the ghost has done a good job". Malini Mannath of Chennai Online wrote "The film has a Ram Gopal Varma touch. But even the ace director has not managed to give his supernatural thrillers such a well-packaged and structured look, the way Senthilnathan has. It's not a film for the faint-hearted. But it's a real treat for lovers of this genre".

The reviewers from Sify wrote that "Yogi as Krishna is one of the most impressive actors, one has seen in recent times. The director has been able to give an eerie look and feel to the film", while Pavithra Srinivasan of Rediff.com said "it is the climax though, that packs a punch, and worth all the minutes of waiting, watching and wondering. An end that fits perfectly with the tone of the story, incidentally tying up with the title of the movie as well. A pat on the back to the editor for some slick work."

== Legacy ==
In late 2007, Senthilnathan and Yogi planned to collaborate again for a film titled Naan, but the project did not develop into production.

Production on a prequel for the film, titled Sivi 2 (2022), began in early 2021, with the film eventually released in July 2022. The sequel of the film took forward the story from the original version.
