= Silambarasan =

Indian actor, filmmaker, and musician (born 1984)

- Silambarasan in 2025
- Born: Silambarasan Tesingu Rajendar; 3 February 1983 (age 43); Madras, Tamil Nadu, India
- Other names: Simbu, S. T. R., Ātman
- Education: Loyola College, Chennai
- Occupations: Actor; filmmaker; singer; musician; voice actor
- Years active: 1984–present
- Works: Filmography; Discography
- Father: T. Rajendar
- Family: See Rajendar family

Silambarasan Tesingu Rajendar (born 3 February 1983), popularly known as Simbu or by his initials as STR, is an Indian actor, filmmaker and musician who primarily works in Tamil cinema. He is a recipient of two Edison Awards and three SIIMA Awards.

He is the eldest son of actor/director T. Rajendar. He began his acting career by playing roles as a child artist in films directed by his father, before his first lead role in his father's Kadhal Azhivathillai (2002).

In 2004, he starred in Manmadhan which was a huge success and became a turning point in his acting career. He went on to star in several commercially successful films such as Saravana (2006), Vinnaithaandi Varuvaayaa (2010), Vaanam (2011), Achcham Yenbadhu Madamaiyada (2016), Chekka Chivantha Vaanam (2018) and Maanaadu (2021).

== Early life ==
Silambarasan TR was born on 3 February 1983 in Madras, Tamil Nadu, as the eldest child of T. Rajendar, a Tamilian, and Usha Rajendar, a Telugu. He has a younger brother Kuralarasan, and a sister Ilakiya. From an early age, he has been a devout Hindu and an ardent follower of Lord Shiva.

Silambarasan TR was educated at Don Bosco Matriculation Higher Secondary School, Chennai. He then studied at the Loyola College, Chennai. Silambarasan TR starred in many of his father's films as a child until 2002, when he acted in his father's Kadhal Azhivathillai, his first main role as a hero.

== Film career ==
=== 1984–2001 ===
Silambarasan appeared as a baby in the film Uravai Kaatha Kili held by his father T Rajendar. He started acting in several of his father's movies, including En Thangai Kalyani, Samsara Sangeetham, Santhi Enathu Santhi, Enga Veetu Velan, Pettredutha Pillai, Sabash Babu, Oru Vasantha Geetham, Thai Thangai Paasam, Monisha En Monalisa and Sonnal Thaan Kaadhala.

=== 2002–2004 ===
Silambarasan played his first protagonist role in Kadhal Azhivathillai (2002), directed by his father. His second film was Dum (2003), which was loosely based on Jagannadh's 2002 Kannada film Appu. The next release was Alai (2003).

Silambarasan had three releases in 2004; the first was Hari's direction Kovil which deals with the relationship between a Hindu boy and a Christian girl. After this, Silambarasan starred in Kuthu, a remake of the Telugu film Dil.The A. Venkatesh directorial was an all-centre hit and it took Simbu to the masses. His final release in 2004 was Manmadhan, co-starring with Jyothika for the first time, and the film became a turning point in his career.

=== 2005–2009 ===
Silambarasan's first release in 2005 was the film Thotti Jaya, directed by V. Z. Durai. He starred in Saravana (2006), directed by K. S. Ravikumar. This was the second time that Simbu and Jyothika worked together after the success of Manmadhan (2004). He next starred in and directed Vallavan (2006), as well as writing its story, screenplay and co-dialogue.

In 2008, he starred in the action masala film Kaalai, which was a flop. Later that year, he appeared in another action masala film Silambattam.

=== 2010–2015 ===
In 2010, his film Vinnaithaandi Varuvaayaa, directed and written by Gautham Vasudev Menon, became a Tamil 'cult classic' film. Director K. Balachander in an open letter called Silambarasan's performance as his best in his career.

The following year he appeared in two films. In early 2011, he appeared in the multi-starrer Vaanam (2011) as Cable Raja, a poor youngster. The film, a remake of Vedam (2010), featured an ensemble cast, was released to positive reviews and subsequently became a hit at the box office. Later that year, his next release was Osthe (2011), the remake of the Bollywood film, Dabangg (2010). Silambarasan played a police officer for the first time in his career. He had only one release in 2012, Podaa Podi, directed by debutant Vignesh Shivan. His next release was Vaalu, directed by debutant Vijay Chander. It was released in 2015 after a gap of three years due to various issues; actor Vijay helped clear the impediment of the film and aided in its release.

=== 2016–present ===
In 2016, Silambarasan starred in the Pandiraj-directed Idhu Namma Aalu alongside Nayanthara, Andrea Jeremiah and Soori playing lead roles. His next film, Achcham Yenbadhu Madamaiyada, was his second collaboration with Gautham Menon and A. R. Rahman. In 2017, it was reported that Silambarasan had signed up for an English-language film. His next film, Anbanavan Asaradhavan Adangadhavan, was panned by critics and was commercially unsuccessful. The release led to multiple controversies that were reported in the media involving the film's producer, Michael Rayappan blaming him for being uncooperative during the film's production. In 2018, he appeared in Mani Ratnam's, Chekka Chivantha Vaanam, as part of an ensemble cast that included Arvind Swamy, Vijay Sethupathi and Arun Vijay. In 2019, STR acted in Vantha Rajavathaan Varuven, the remake of Attarintiki Daredhi (2013).

After a brief hiatus during the pandemic, Silambarasan revealed to the public that he was on a regimen to significantly reduce his weight and improve his spirituality. He became a vegetarian during this period, lost over 30 kilograms, and also learnt Bharatanatyam. His comeback film was Eeswaran, directed by Suseenthiran. It was released on the eve of Pongal festival in theatres after the COVID-19 lockdown was lifted in Tamil Nadu on 14 January 2021, clashing with Vijay's Master (2021). Silambarasan's next release was the political thriller film, Maanaadu (2021), directed by Venkat Prabhu, which hit theatres in Diwali. In 2022, he returned to TV as the host of Bigg Boss Ultimate.

In 2023, he starred in the gangster film Pathu Thala, which was a remake of the Kannada film Mufti. The film was fairly successful, collecting over ₹50 crores. Silambarasan's next film bankrolled by himself through his new film production house Ātman Cine Arts, was announced with a working title of STR50, marking his 50th feature film. Due to satellite television and overall financial issues, Kamal Haasan and Raaj Kamal Films International had to step away from this project, so Silambarasan was granted to take over the film himself. It is being directed by Desingh Periyasamy. He was also cast in Thug Life, directed by Mani Ratnam, marking his second collaboration with him after Chekka Chivantha Vaanam. It stars Kamal Hassan in the lead role with an ensemble cast of Trisha.

== Music ==
Silambarasan has frequently worked as a playback singer in the Tamil film industry. He first sang in Samsara Sangeetham (credited as chorus) and went on to sing over 90 songs for various composers. He predominantly sings in his own films and has collaborated mostly with his friend and fellow composer Yuvan Shankar Raja. Silambarasan also wrote the lyrics for several songs of his films.

On 27 December 2011, Silambarasan released the non-film single "Love Anthem For World Peace" to promote world peace.

In 2013, he sang "Diamond Girl" in the Telugu film Baadshah directed by Srinu Vaitla starring Jr. NTR and Kajal Aggarwal. This was his first venture in Telugu music.

He stated in the summer of 2015 that he would collaborate with Yuvan Shankar Raja to release the non-film single titled "Karma".

He composed the music and background score for the film Sakka Podu Podu Raja featuring Santhanam in the lead role.

== Personal life ==
=== Relationships ===
His relationships and personal life have been highly subjected by tabloids. During the shooting of Vallavan (2006), he was in a relationship with his co-actress, Nayanthara. However, they broke up by the time the film released, and their relationship was announced a year after they broke up, after he posted photos of them together, which later created a huge controversy. They remained civil and later worked together in Idhu Namma Aalu (2016).

During the shooting of Vaalu (2015), he was in a relationship with his co-actress, Hansika Motwani. However, they too broke up a year later, but remained mutual and he even made a cameo appearance in her film Maha (2022).

== Controversies ==
=== Music ===
In 2010, Silambarasan sang the song "Evan Di Unna Pethan," with music composed by Yuvan Shankar Raja and lyrics jointly written by Silambarasan and Yuvan, as a part of the soundtrack album for his film Vaanam and the song faced severe opposition for its provocative lyrics. A women's rights organisation in Chennai criticised the lyrics and issued a statement to Silambarasan for the lyrics being "chauvinistic" that "demean women". Further it was argued that "music needs to appeal to larger sections than to the ‘thrill-seeking’ youth who are often misguided into ‘cheap thrills’ because of such songs", demanding censorship. However, several prominent people from the film industry came to support Silambarasan stating that there have been more objectionable scenes in films in the past and that there were "bigger issues in society" and applying censorship was not "the ideal way out in democracy."

After releasing a promotional version of "Love Anthem For World Peace" song in 2011, Silambarasan announced that a final version would be released thereafter and announced his desire to bring in international artists Akon and Rihanna for the venture. He subsequently headed to Los Angeles in January 2012 and recorded an original version of the song by himself at Studio Zappa with music producer Elan Morrison on the keyboards. The failure to sign in the international artists prompted the project's producer, Silambarasan's father T. Rajendar to lodge a police complaint against two agents who had misled his production company into supposed connections with the international artists concerned. Rajendar noted that the sound editor Ramji Soma and a Canadian entrepreneur Talvinder Bathh had charged Rs 12 million ($200,000) from his company and failed to return it despite promises made to sign on Akon, David Guetta and either Rihanna or Nicole Scherzinger for the project. In May 2013, Silambarasan was finally successfully able to bring in Akon to collaborate for an alternate version of the song, with the move being facilitated by Tracktical Entertainment. The latest version of the song is yet to be released, with Silambarasan hinting in early 2014 that the song may be launched before the end of 2014. In an interview in June 2015, he revealed that the venture would be resumed soon, though that he was busy with other commitments.

In December 2015, a song, referred to by the media as the "Beep Song" was leaked online and was widely circulated. The song was initially reported to be written and sung by Silambarasan and composed by music director Anirudh Ravichander, and featured an expletive degrading women which had been beeped out. Subsequently, Anirudh denied any involvement in the song and Silambarasan clarified that he had written, composed and sung the song himself, stating he was unsure how the song was leaked and uploaded onto the internet. The song provoked widespread criticism from pressure groups and film personalities. Women activists organised protests in front of Silambarasan house in T. Nagar and other places. Meanwhile, the Left-wing of All India Democratic Women's Association (AIDWA) alleged that the song was sexist and derogatory to women and filed a case against Silambarasan in Coimbatore. Based on the complaint, The Racecourse Police Station registered FIR against the actor and Anirudh. Likewise, the Cyber Crime Police in Egmore also registered a similar case against them. Silambarasan stated on his Twitter page that he will not hide anywhere and will face the course of law. However, he failed to appear in the Racecourse Police station on 19 December 2015 as per the summons sent to him. Fearing arrest, Silambarasan had moved the case to the Madras High Court for anticipatory bail. The Madras High Court consequently refused to issue an interim stay to arrest Silambarasan. In late February 2016, Silambarasan appeared before the Coimbatore City police in connection with the "Beep Song" case and claimed that he had composed the song long ago when he was depressed due to a love failure; he further stated that Anirudh had no role in it.

=== Relationship with directors ===
Silambarasan experienced difficulties with director A. J. Murugan during the making of his breakthrough film, Manmadhan (2004) and was widely reported by the media to have "ghost-directed" the project. Murugan later suggested that Silambarasan and his family then continually deprived him of royalties deriving from the film, such as the story credits, the Hindi remake rights and sequel rights. Murugan was later demoted and worked in Silambarasan's directorial venture, Vallavan (2006) as an associate director, and was consequently critical of the actor's insistence on interfering with the director's role. Another associate director of Silambarasan, G. T. Nandhu, also fell out with the actor during the making of Kettavan in 2007. The project was launched with Nandhu as the director but he later complained that Silambarasan actively encroached his role and subsequently left his name out of the film's promotional posters. Despite completing a schedule, the pair could not sort out their differences and the film was shelved.

Soon after the failure of their collaboration in Kaalai (2008), director Tarun Gopi was critical of Silambarasan's involvement in the project and stated that the actor grossly interfered with his duties as a director. Gopi labelled the actor "unprofessional" and stated that he could not recognise the film from his original script. He later apologised for his remarks in late 2011. Cinematographer Madhi also had similar problems with the actor during the making of Silambattam (2008). In 2010, Linguswamy sacked Silambarasan from the production of Vettai (2012) after the actor suddenly began production on another film, Vaanam, without letting the director know. In reply, Silambarasan argued that Linguswamy had wasted hundred days of his time without telling him the script of Vettai and called the director "unprofessional". Silambarasan was later replaced in Vettai by Arya, while he chose to launch another new project titled Vettai Mannan immediately after his removal from Vettai and that movie was also shelved.

During the making of Idhu Namma Aalu, the film's production delays meant that director Pandiraj and Silambarasan had difficulties. In July 2014, Silambarasan had changed his hairstyle in between schedule breaks, leaving Pandiraj unhappy. Silambarasan subsequently disclosed to the media that Idhu Namma Aalu was his production and that others should not question his involvement in the project. Pandiraj later also publicly clashed with Silambarasan's brother, the composer Kuralarasan, stating his annoyance at the delay in providing the film's music. He also defended actress Nayanthara against a complaint made by Silambarasan's father to be, producer T. Rajender, and stated the actress had wasted almost two years on the film due to the producers' poor organisation and was still yet to be paid for her work. He further stated that Silambarasan was insisting an extra "kuthu" number that the script did not warrant and that Rajender, Kuralarasan and Silambarasan were unnecessarily interested in making sure that the song was included against Pandiraj's wishes. Gautham Vasudev Menon has also spoken out against the actor's lack of punctuality, revealing that the actor failed to turn up for a shoot abroad during the making of Achcham Enbadhu Madamaiyada, prompting a delay in the film's production. However he has also labelled Silambarasan as an "outstanding actor" and noted his high levels of comfort and trust in Silambarasan's ability.

=== Relationship with producers ===
Silambarasan's Anbanavan Asaradhavan Adangadhavan (2017) opened in June 2017 to negative reviews and became a box office failure. Several months after the release, the film's producer Michael Rayappan and director Adhik Ravichandran met the media to criticise the actor's unruly behaviour and interference during the course of the project. They alleged that during the first schedule, production was delayed by two months because several actresses refused to star opposite Silambarasan knowing his unprofessionalism and that later, the actor insisted that the team shift to a different town from the finalised town of Madurai, as he did not like the warm climate. After moving the shoot to Dindigul, he continued to refuse to shoot in public areas or on Sundays and regularly failed to turn up as per the agreed schedule. They alleged that during the first schedule, Silambarasan refused to film a song sequence, unfairly requested Shriya Saran to be replaced after she had finished her portions, demanded the shoot to be moved to London from Dubai and made false promises about reducing his body weight as required for the script. During the second schedule, it was alleged that he out-rightly refused to undergo makeup sessions, refused to turn up to shoot on time, demanded a hotel room on the East Coast Road, refused to provide hotel expenses and demanded that a production executive was sacked. Silambarasan also cancelled the third schedule and demanded that the film was released in two parts against the makers' wishes, while sending his team to Thailand to have leisure time on the producers' money. He later refused to coordinate when completing necessary scenes to make it a two-part film and also half-heartedly provided dubbing work. The producer revealed that out of an agreed schedule of seventy-six days, Silambarasan only worked on thirty-eight days, meaning that the dates of Tamannaah and Shriya Saran were widely wasted. As a result of the incident, Silambarasan was widely criticised by his peers in the Tamil film industry.

In 2018, the Madras High Court ruled that Silambarasan had to pay back the money that he received as an advance from the producers at Passion Movie Makers. The ruling was in relation to the actor's failure to turn up for the shoot of a project titled Arasan, directed by Narayan Nagendra Rao, during the development of the film in 2015. Despite reluctance from the director to begin a civil suit, the producers filed a complaint and recovered the advance. In August 2019, producer Suresh Kamatchi announced that he had ousted Silambarasan from his film Maanaadu owing to the actor's failure to commit to dates properly. The film, which was directed by Venkat Prabhu, had undergone pre-production work for close to a year before Silambarasan's exit. Silambarasan later chose to launch another new project titled Maghaa Maanaadu immediately after his removal from Maanaadu. Along with Michael Rayappan and Suresh Kamatchi, several other producers came forward with an official complaint to the Tamil Film Producers Council about Silambarasan's poor punctuality during August 2019. Gnanavel Raja of Studio Green, Vijaya Raghavendra of All in All Pictures, and Madan of Escape Artists Motion Pictures were among those who were keen to get the body to compel the actor to return their advances. Gnanavel Raja had been making an untitled film with the actor directed by Narathar, while Raghavendra had paid the actor a deposit for Vinnaithaandi Varuvaayaa 2.

The actor's films have also languished in development hell since 2011, with the media widely labelling his interference as a reason behind the delays. Vignesh Shivan's Podaa Podi (2012) took four years to complete after production had started, while his next release Vaalu (2015) took three years. Another film, Nelson Dilipkumar's Vettai Mannan, began in November 2010 and was ultimately shelved, with the actor shooting for the film intermittently. Likewise Idhu Namma Aalu and Gautham Menon's Achcham Enbadhu Madamaiyada, began in 2013 and both were released in 2016 after publicised production delays. Silambarasan has also announced various directorial projects, which have failed to materialise, including Valiban in 2009, Manmadhan 2 in 2012 and an untitled English film in 2017.

=== Relationships with colleagues ===
Silambarasan has regularly had differences of opinions with fellow actors in the Tamil film industry. He has had a long-running rivalry with actor Dhanush, which has been widely reported in the media. Initial hostility between the pair began after certain punch dialogues from Silambarasan's Manmadhan (2004) had seemed to be directed at Dhanush, including a reference to his sudden rise to fame with Kadhal Kondein (2003) and his marriage to Aishwarya Dhanush, the daughter of leading actor Rajinikanth. When questioned about their rivalry in 2005, Silambarasan stated that the pair were not friends and that Dhanush failed to reciprocate his pleasantries at a wedding. Silambarasan continued to take shots at Dhanush through film dialogues in Kaalai (2008) and during the teaser trailer of Vaalu in 2012.

Following the widespread acclaim of Dhanush's song, "Why This Kolaveri Di" from 3 (2012), Silambarasan claimed that he began the trend of writing songs with simple lyrics and releasing single tracks for films, in reference to his "Evan Di Unna Pethan" from Vaanam (2011). He subsequently also recorded, filmed and released a promotional video to his "Love Anthem For World Peace" within a month of "Why This Kolaveri Di"'s release. The actor's actions and song were criticised by the media during the period, who felt he purely just wanted to compete with Dhanush. In 2012, the pair reconciled and sorted their difference during an awards ceremony held in Dubai, and later celebrated Dhanush's birthday together. Dhanush dismissed reports that the pair were rivals and stated that misunderstandings had grown as a result of their lack of interaction. Dhanush later offered Silambarasan the opportunity to feature in a cameo role in his production, Kaaka Muttai (2015).

Silambarasan had a dispute with veteran comedian Goundamani following the release of Manmadhan (2004), with the comedian feeling that the actor had edited out too many of his scenes. In reply, Silambarasan noted that the cuts were necessary for the pace of the film, while adding that Goundamani as a senior actor, should have known better. During the making of Vallavan (2006), actress Reemma Sen threatened legal action against Silambarasan after he made changes to the scope of her role in the film. She later stated she regretted her claim and was proud to have won critical acclaim for the character. Actress Lekha Washington was also critical of her experience working with Silambarasan on the shelved film Kettavan, and noted that she faced harassment on the sets. In 2007, Silambarasan had a televised spat with actor Babloo Prithiveeraj during the filming of the dance show Jodi Number One, in which Silambarasan appeared as a judge. The actor argued with Prithveeraj regarding his dancing ability and later stormed out of the sets in tears, before being brought back by the other judges.

In early 2011, Silambarasan and actor Jiiva briefly displayed public enmity after Silambarasan had talked down the success of Jiiva's Ko (2011). Silambarasan had walked out of the production of Ko after a photoshoot in early 2010 over creative differences with director K. V. Anand, particularly on the issue of the casting of Karthika Nair as the lead actress. Jiiva publicly called Silambarasan a "back stabber", though soon both actors decided to stop their respective public name calling. Following the release of Vaanam (2011), actor Bharath expressed his disappointment at being largely left out of the film's promotions and alleged that Silambarasan had asked the producers to reduce publicity for the film's other actors. Bharath called the incident a "sad phase in his career" and stated he was unsure if he would work with Silambarasan again. In return, Silambarasan denied any involvement in the film's promotional strategy and hinted that the film's success was largely dependent on his star image.

During the campaigning process for the 2015 Nadigar Sangam elections, Silambarasan launched a scathing personal attack on actor Vishal during a press conference. Silambarasan had run for the position of vice-president as a part of Sarathkumar's team, and in a bid to denounce Vishal's credibility for the opposing party, the actor alleged that Vishal had a personal vendetta against Sarathkumar. He further added that Vishal was behaving like a "fox" and ridiculed Vishal's stature to be a part of the election. Silambarasan's actions were widely criticised, with Vishal subsequently thanking the actor for tilting public opinion further towards his team. Subsequently, Sarathkumar's team and Silambarasan unanimously lost in the election process.

== Awards ==
Honors

- Kalaimamani Award from Government of Tamil Nadu (2006)
- Honorary doctorate by Vels University (2022)

Winners

- 12th Cinema Express Awards for Best Child Artiste for Santhi Enathu Santhi
- SIIMA Award for Stylish Star of South Cinema (2012)
- SIIMA Award for Best Male Playback Singer (Telugu) for "Diamond Girl" from Baadshah (2014)
- ITFA Best Actor Award for Vaanam (2011)
- Edison Award for Best Actor for Vinnaithaandi Varuvaaya (2010)
- Big FM Tamil Entertainment Awards – Most Entertaining Actor Award for Vinnaithaandi Varuvaaya (2010)
- Isaiyaruvi Tamil Music Awards – Rising Star Lyricist for "Where is the Party" for Silambattam (2009)
- Edison Award for Best Actor for Achcham Yenbadhu Madamaiyada (2016)

Nominations

- Vijay Award for Best Actor for Vinnaithaandi Varuvaayaa (2010)
- Filmfare Award for Best Actor – Tamil for Vinnaithaandi Varuvaayaa (2010)
