= Love Anthem For World Peace =

Song by Silambarasan Akon
- Released: 27 December 2011
- Recorded: 2011
- Length: 2:42
- Label: Sony Music
- Songwriter: Silambarasan
- Producer: Silambarasan

Music video
- "Love Anthem" on YouTube

"Love Anthem For World Peace" is an Indian song done by Silambarasan with a thought of spreading the message of love world over, written, sung and composed by the actor. A version of the song was officially released on 27 December 2011.

== Development ==
In December 2011, Silambarasan revealed that he had recorded a promotional song promoting world peace, written in 96 different languages. Sony Music bought the rights of the song and launched a teaser version on 23 December 2011, with the actor revealing it was a "Christmas message to global fans". The song composed by Silambarasan himself, featured Drums Sivamani on percussions, Dharan Kumar as a keyboardist, KR Vaisakh as Music Programmer and Ramji Soma as a sound editor. The 2 minute 40 second song teaser gained positive reviews and became popular on social networking sites. Silambarasan announced that a final version would be released thereafter and announced his desire to bring in international artists Akon and Rihanna for the venture. He subsequently headed to Los Angeles in January 2012 and recorded an original version of the song by himself at Frank Zappa's Studio with music producer Elan Morrison. The failure to rope in the international artists prompted the project's producer, Silambarasan's father T. Rajender to lodge a police complaint against two agents who had misled his production company into supposed connections with the international artists concerned. Rajendar noted that the sound editor Ramji Soma and a Canadian entrepreneur Talvinder Bathh had charged Rs 1.2 crore from his company and failed to return it despite promises made to sign on Akon, David Guetta and either Rihanna or Nicole Scherzinger for the project.

In May 2013, Silambarasan was finally successfully able to bring in American hip-hop artist Akon to collaborate for an alternate version of the song, with the move being facilitated by Vameedharan of Tracktical Entertainment. Akon flew into Chennai for a two-day stay, where he recorded the song and also shot for the music video directed by Vignesh Shivan at Binny Mills. Silambarasan noted that this version would be more about "oneness and the need to spread love" and that the proposed filming with Akon had initially been long-delayed as a result of conflicting schedules. The latest version of the song is yet to be released, with Silambarasan hinting in early 2014 that the song may be launched before the end of 2014. In an interview in June 2015, he revealed that the venture would be resumed soon, though that he was busy with other commitments. In June 2016, in an interaction through Periscope, Silambarasan revealed that he was still waiting for a female singer to collaborate with for the song and that he would only release the song thereafter those portions were recorded.

== Music video ==
The music video from December 2011 features the actor-playback singer Silambarasan singing the song and a linguist helping him with lyrics. The video was directed by Vignesh Shivan, cinematography by Shakthi with still photographs by Karthik Srinivasan and costumes designed by Vasuki Bhaskar.

== Legacy ==
The film Pyaar Prema Kaadhal takes it title from the lyrics of the chorus from the song. Produced by Silambarasan's friend Yuvan Shankar Raja and starring Harish Kalyan alongside Raiza Wilson, the film began production during November 2017 and released in August 2018.
