= Podaa Podi =

2012 film directed by Vignesh Shivan

- Theatrical release poster
- Directed by: Vignesh Shivan
- Written by: Vignesh Shivan
- Produced by: V. Hitesh Jhabak (presenter); Padam Kumar; Meenu Kumar
- Starring: Silambarasan; Varalakshmi
- Cinematography: Duncan Telford; J. Laxman; R. Rathnavelu
- Edited by: Anthony
- Music by: Dharan Kumar
- Production company: Gemini Film Circuit
- Distributed by: Nemichand Jhabak
- Release date: 13 November 2012
- Running time: 125 minutes
- Country: India
- Language: Tamil

Podaa Podi (transl. Go boy, go girl) is a 2012 Indian Tamil-language musical romantic comedy film written and directed by debutant Vignesh Shivan, starring Silambarasan and debutant Varalakshmi. The score and soundtrack of the film were composed by Dharan Kumar, while cinematography and editing were handled by Duncan Telford and Anthony Gonsalves, respectively. The film was announced in 2008, began filming in 2010 but was released only on 13 November 2012 as a Diwali release. The film received mixed reviews and performed average at the box office.

== Plot ==
Arjun, an animation artist living in London with his uncle, meets Nisha in a pub and tries to impress her by showing his wallet full of fake currency. She is an aspiring dancer who is living with her aunt Veena. After going around together for a day, Nisha proposes a relationship, and Arjun agrees. Arjun hates Nisha attending salsa classes with her friend Mojo as her partner. However, Arjun agrees to marry Nisha.

After their marriage, Nisha makes it clear that she still wants to dance and enter the UK competition "Let's Dance" and make a career for herself. Arjun suddenly discovers that he believes that a woman's place is in the home. On the advice of his uncle, he impregnates her, so that she stays away from dancing.

The birth of their first child brings happiness to their family. They go to Hong Kong Disneyland for their babymoon. After they return, in a family conversation, Arjun's uncle mentions his "advice" of making Nisha pregnant so that she would not dance any more. Realising that the child was the result of Arjun's cheap plan and not love towards her, Nisha walks out. Arjun tries to console her but gets angry when she meets a friend who greets her with a hug. Arjun, who gets immediately jealous, goes and starts fighting with her friend, while she pleads him to stop. Nisha crosses the road with her baby, which is then suddenly killed by a car. Arjun and Nisha separate and live in sorrow.

Several months later, Arjun comes to Nisha and pleads her aunt to make her come back and says that if he ever has another child (which he definitely wants) it will be only with her. She comes back on the condition that she continues dancing. However, during her practices she becomes self-conscious due to the things Arjun said to her. Her partner, Mojo, refuses to work with her so Arjun tries to convince him to come back. Arjun then ends up beating Mojo, so that she will be left without a partner and leave the competition. She convinces Arjun to be her partner, but his steps fail in the first round. Impressed by Nisha dancing skills, judges give her another chance, provided she changes her partner. Arjun convinces her to do a dappankuthu dance, which impresses the judges. But she is not happy, because they have to clear 14 rounds to win the competition. Suddenly, Arjun decides to impregnate her again. The film ends with both of them living with their new child.

== Cast ==
- Silambarasan as Arjun
- Varalakshmi as Nisha
- VTV Ganesh as Arjun's uncle
- Shobana as Veena, Nisha's aunt
- Jeffrey Warden as Mojo
- Samarth Suraj as Arjun and Nisha's son

Special appearances in the song "Love Panalama Venama"

- Santhanam
- Premji Amaren
- Vignesh Shivan
- Robert

== Production ==
Vignesh Shivan made a short film and after getting Dharan Kumar to compose music for it; showed the film to producers, Gemini Film Circuit, and then to his childhood friend, actor Silambarasan and both parties agreed to collaborate to make it a feature film. The joint producers of the film, Shanaya Telefilms, released a series of posters in June 2008 publicising the film, while Silambarasan and Vignesh toured in Canada scouting for locations and agreeing a deal with Mayor Ron Stevens to film in Orillia and Toronto. The film was titled Mr Poda and Mrs Podi. In June 2008, reports emerged that Varalakshmi, daughter of prominent actor R. Sarathkumar, would play the lead role of a ballet dancer in the film, now shortened to Poda Podi.

For his look in the film, Silambarasan worked with Toni & Guy salon and for the initial photoshoot of the film in Mumbai, the producers had stylists from the international brand fly down in August 2008 to give him a new haircut and styling for his hair. By December 2008, the film failed to start, and reports emerged that Silambarasan would restart Kettavan, a film which he had stalled before. Poor weather in Canada initially delayed the production of the film, with Gemini Films making a statement in June 2009 that the film was not dropped, after media speculation. The film's delays led to Varalaxmi opting out of the film, with her father stating that he would decide when to launch her in the film industry. Subsequently, the film was temporarily put on hold with Silambarasan opting to prioritise other ventures.

The film resurfaced and finally began shoot in August 2010 in London and the team shot scenes in a 45-day schedule, with Silambarasan learning salsa for the film under the guidance of Jeffrey Vardon – other choreography was staged by Regan Shepherd. The team also shot further scenes in Spain in April 2011. A song was filmed in Chennai in November 2011, with Santhanam and Premji Amaren making special appearances in the music video. The film went through further delays after Silambarasan committed schedules to finish Osthe and Vettai Mannan, with the film being touted as a Valentine's Day 2012 release. In January 2012, the actor left for the United States to work on his studio album "The Love Anthem", resulting in his ongoing film projects getting postponed again. The final portion of the film was shot in a ten-day schedule in Macau, Hong Kong from 20 March 2012 onwards. Silambarasan's one-year-old nephew Samarth was revealed to play his son. A song depicting the relationship between a father and son, was shot at Hong Kong Disneyland, making Podaa Podi the first Tamil film shot there.

== Music ==
In April 2010, Dharan stated that the soundtrack album would consist of six tracks, further adding that Silambarasan had sung two songs and that composer-singer Yuvan Shankar Raja would also sing one of the songs. The album finally features eight tracks, including an instrumental, while Silambarasan has sung three songs, of which two were penned by him; a song by Yuvan Shankar Raja was not featured. The title track had been sung by Benny Dayal and actress-singer Andrea Jeremiah. Besides Silambarasan, director Vignesh Shivan had penned the lyrics for four songs, while Na. Muthukumar and Vaali had written each one song.

== Release ==
Podaa Podi was scheduled to be released on the occasion of Valentine's Day, 14 February 2012. But the film was delayed due to Silambarasan's commitments to other projects. In September 2012, the makers announced that the film will be released on the Diwali festival season, which falls on 13 November 2012, clashing with Thuppakki (2012).

=== Reception ===
The film opened to mixed reviews from critics. The Times of India gave 3 out of 5 stating "Podaa Podi is strictly a movie for youngsters. The story is lopsided at most times, titling towards the man's point-of-view. It might win loud applause in the theatres, but it is doubtful as to how many viewers will support it otherwise." Malathi Ranganathan of The Hindu stated "More than half a dozen times in the film, the hero says, 'Very good Ma!' But you can't say the same about PP." Sify gave 3 out of 5 stars and stated "Podaa Podi is a lovely romantic ride with some peppy music." Pavithra Srinivasan of Rediff gave 2.5 out of 5 reviewed "Despite Varu's great performance, Poda Podi ends in a disappointing fashion."

=== Accolades ===
At the 2nd South Indian International Movie Awards, Varalakshmi was nominated for Best Debutant Female, and Ganesh for Best Comedian.
