= Parijatham (2006 film) =

- DVD cover
- Directed by: K. Bhagyaraj
- Written by: Bhagyaraj
- Produced by: V. Ravichandran
- Starring: Prithviraj Sukumaran; Saranya Bhagyaraj
- Cinematography: Venu Natraj; A. Venkatesh
- Music by: Songs: Dharan; Score: Sabesh–Murali
- Production company: Aascar Film Pvt. Ltd
- Release date: 9 June 2006
- Country: India
- Language: Tamil
- Budget: ₹3 crore (US$320,000)

Parijatham is a 2006 Indian Tamil language romantic comedy film directed by Bhagyaraj. The film stars Prithviraj Sukumaran and Saranya Bhagyaraj. It was released to positive reviews and became a box office hit.

== Plot ==
Santhosh and Seetha have a son named Surendhar. Sumathi lived in a palatial house and enjoyed a luxurious life in her childhood. However, her father loses his textile business and sinks into poverty.

Seetha moves to the house opposite Sumathi's house. Her husband and son are still back in their city, waiting to finish training. Sumathi approaches her to work as a maid. Seetha becomes impressed at first sight by Sumathi's wise and sensible character and takes her as her maid. After a few days, Seetha learns that the house she has moved into was initially owned by Sumathi's family. She gets influenced by Sumathi's modesty, kindness, and good nature. Sumathi also had the habit of writing novels, one of which she shared with Seetha. Seetha imagined her son and Sumathi as the characters in the story (the characters are named Sridhar and Subhathra), which gave her the opportunity to react differently. Assuming her son and Sumathi are fictional characters in the story, she expresses her desire to make Sumathi her daughter-in-law. At first Sumathi is shocked, but she accepts her request happily.

Seetha communicates this arrangement over the phone to her husband and son that she has chosen her daughter-in-law. However, she did not reveal the name or identity of Sumathi, because she wants it to be a surprise when they meet her in person. Unfortunately, Seetha dies in an accident before her husband and son's arrival, which leaves a suspense as to who the daughter-in-law is.

After his mother's death, Surendhar vows to locate and marry a girl identified by his mother. Since Sumathi is a maid in the house and is much poorer compared to Seetha's family, she does not reveal she is the one. Sampooranam, Surendhar's close friend, moves into their house to snoop around and find out the girl identified by Seetha. As a father, Santhosh didn't have patience and wanted his son to have a good life. This led him choosing a rich girl, completely opposite of what Seetha would have chosen.

Past many twists and turns, Sampooranam succeeds in identifying that Sumathi was the girl Seetha chose. His main evidence was Sumathi's published novel, the one she shared to Seetha. Surendhar happily marries Sumathi with Santhosh and Sampooranam's blessings. The story ends with Sumathi remembering the words of Seetha, that she has always imagined Sumathi to be the wife of her son.

== Cast ==
- Prithviraj Sukumaran as Surendhar / Sridhar
- Saranya Bhagyaraj as Sumathi / Subathra
- Bhagyaraj as Sampooranam
- R. N. Sudarshan as Sundra Raja
- Prakash Raj as Santhosh, Surendhar's father
- Seetha as Seetha, Surendhar's mother
- Sarath Babu as Saravana, Sumathi's father
- Vanitha Krishnachandran as Thirumathi Ramaiah, Subathra's mother
- Thalaivasal Vijay as Muthu, Subathra's father
- Roja as Shenbagam, Sridhar's mother
- Nassar as Shanmugavel, Sridhar's father
- Keerthana as Subathra's sister
- Ilavarasu as Sethuraman, Surendhar's uncle
- Nanditha Jennifer as Vasumathi
- Manobala
- Hemalatha as Subathra's friend
- Ammu Ramachandran as Vasanthi, Subathra's friend
- Aarthi as Surendhar's co-worker
- Madhan Bob
- Nellai Siva
- Pei Krishnan
- Mippu

== Production ==
Prashanth was initially expected to be play the role when the film was announced in August 2004, before he opted out and was replaced by Prithviraj.

== Soundtrack ==
The soundtrack consists of five songs composed by Dharan. Dharan used to participate in music programs in the college that director K. Bhagyaraj's daughter Saranya studied in. For the film, Saranya recommended Dharan as the film composer. The album became a chartbuster, with the song "Unnai Kandaene" being listed among the top ten songs of the year. Since Dharan was suffering from malaria, he could not handle background score; instead the score was completed by Sabesh–Murali. Sify in its review described Dharan's songs and background score as "a major highlight" of the film, which became a commercial successful as well.

Song name – Singers – Lyricists:

- "Ennil Ennil Nee" – Haricharan, Mahathi – Rathnam
- "Oru Nodi Iru Nodi" – Karthik, Srilekha Parthasarathy, Shweta Mohan – Pa Vijay
- "Theme Music" – Dharan
- "Unnai Kandane" – Haricharan, Shruthi – Na Muthukumar
- "Yedho Nadakuthu" – Krithika Nelson, Ranjith – Pa Vijay

== Reception and box office ==
Lajjavathi of Kalki wrote those who have the patience to watch mega serials with hundred episodes in a row can freely watch Parijatham with their family. Cinesouth wrote, "The knots in a story line are like loose strands of hair and braiding it together into an effective screenplay is a work of art. Bhagyaraj must be credited for his admirable skill in weaving the screenplay of ‘Parijatham’ with twists, knots and sparkling humour in a pleasant dosage. By narrating story within a story, Bhagyaraj has made ‘Parijatham’ fragrant". Chennai Online wrote "His [Bhagyaraj] script here is cleverly etched with some twists and turns, the lines at times sparkling with humour, mercifully sans the double entendres he's famous for. The manner in which he has got his lead pair to enact two roles (it's not the conventional dual role) lends an innovative touch to the narration".

The film was a commercial success.
