= Dharan Kumar =

Indian singer (born 1983)

Dharan Kumar s
- Born: 8 October 1983 (age 42); Madras, Tamil Nadu, India
- Genres: Film score, hip hop
- Occupations: Film composer, music director
- Years active: 2006–present

Dharan Kumar (born 8 October 1983) is an Indian music composer, who mainly produces film scores and soundtracks in the Tamil film industry. He made his film debut Parijatham, featuring the single "Unnai Kandene". He credits director and actor K. Bhagyaraj as his guru.

== Early life ==
Dharan was born on 8 October 1983 in Madras, Tamil Nadu. He did his schooling at St. Johns, Don Bosco Matriculation Higher Secondary School and Anna Gem schools in Chennai. He started working as an assistant to composer Harris Jayaraj in the films Kaakha Kaakha, Chellame and Anniyan.

== Career ==
=== Film scores ===
Dharan used to participate in music programs in the college, director K. Bhagyaraj's daughter Saranya studied in. Dharan entered the film industry as a composer in 2005. For Saranya Bhagyaraj's debut venture, Parijatham, directed by her father, Saranya recommended Dharan as the film composer. The album became a chartbuster, with the song "Unnai Kandaene" being listed among the top ten songs of the year. Sify in its review described Dharan's songs and background score as "a major highlight" of the film, which became a commercial successful as well.

His next release was the soundtrack album to the low-budget horror thriller Sivi that starred newcomers. The album received very positive reviews and response as well, while Dharan's background score was highly appreciated by critics and described as "haunting", and "top-class" that gives the film "its true color". Behindwoods, in particular, praised his work, citing that Dharan had "enjoyed his work and threatened [the audience] continuously with his music", further adding that he had understood his role "perfectly well" and "delivered the goods with a sharp flourish". The film, despite garnering favourable reviews, performed poorly at the box office. In 2009, his next album, the soundtrack to the gangster film Laadam, released, which was based on Hip-hop music, featuring Malaysian rappers Dr. Burn and Emcee Jezz. The film, directed by Prabu Solomon, also bombed at the box office, failing to propel his career.

In 2010, Dharan first release was Bharath's Thambikku Indha Ooru, which, too was highly unsuccessful at the box office, while his next release would be Siddhu +2, collaborating again with K. Bhagyaraj. The soundtrack to the film was released in 2009, for which he made composer Yuvan Shankar Raja and director Venkat Prabhu to sing each a song, with the former's song "Poove Poove" emerging a chartbuster. He made his Malayalam debut with The Thriller, starring Prithviraj Sukumaran and worked on the Salsa-based romantic-musical Podaa Podi which also features a Bhangra number. Upon the release on 10 October 2012, the album became a big chartbuster.

=== Non-film ventures ===
Dharan has worked on non-film projects as well. In 2009, he produced a single "Sing One More Time" as a tribute to Michael Jackson, who Dharan describes as his "biggest inspiration in his childhood". The single, which also partly features lyrics by him, was rendered by ten singers and released as a video album. He had also composed the theme song for the 2010 Challenger Beach Volleyball Championship, held in Chennai, apart from composing jingles for television advertisements. Dharan composed team anthems for the cricket team Ruby Trichy Warriors in the 2016 and 2017 editions of Tamil Nadu Premier League. The multi-talented T. Rajendar gave voice for team anthem of 2016 edition and the lyrics were written by RJ Vijay, while for 2017 edition anthem, both voice and lyrics were given by RJ Vijay. In January 2018, RJ Vijay and Dharan associated again to produce a single "Yaaru Kitta"- a Jallikattu anthem as a tribute to 2017 pro-jallikattu protests. In March 2021, Dharan collaborated with Sivaangi Krishnakumar and released an album song Asku Maaro featuring Kavin and Teju Ashwini with lyrics penned down by Ku. Karthik and was directed by Dongli Jumbo.

== Personal life ==
In September 2017, Dharan married film actress Deekshitha Manikkam.

== Discography ==
=== Released projects ===
- Note: all films are in Tamil, unless otherwise noted.

| Year | Films | Score | Songs | Notes |
|---|---|---|---|---|
| 2006 | Parijatham | Yes | Yes | |
| 2007 | Sivi | Yes | Yes | |
| 2008 | Yaaradi Nee Mohini | No | Yes | 2 songs (Second release) |
| 2008 | Nenu Meeku Telusa? | Yes | No | Telugu film; dubbed in Tamil as Ennai Theriyuma |
| 2009 | Laadam | Yes | Yes | |
| 2009 | Naan Aval Adhu | No | Yes | 1 song (Promo) |
| 2009 | Siddu +2 | Yes | Yes | |
| 2010 | Thambikku Indha Ooru | Yes | Yes | |
| 2010 | The Thriller | Yes | Yes | Malayalam film |
| 2012 | Podaa Podi | Yes | Yes | |
| 2013 | Samar | Yes | No | |
| 2013 | Virattu | Yes | Yes | |
| 2013 | Endrendrum | Yes | Yes | |
| 2013 | Thagaraaru | Yes | Yes | |
| 2013 | Inga Enna Solluthu | Yes | Yes | |
| 2014 | Aaha Kalyanam | Yes | Yes | |
| 2014 | Naaigal Jaakirathai | Yes | Yes | |
| 2015 | Kaaval | Yes | Yes | 1 song |
| 2016 | Manal Kayiru 2 | Yes | Yes | |
| 2017 | Kadhal Kasakuthaiya | Yes | Yes | |
| 2018 | Abhiyum Anuvum | Yes | Yes | |
| 2018 | Maanik | Yes | Yes | |
| 2019 | Zhagaram | Yes | Yes | |
| 2019 | Natpuna Ennanu Theriyuma | Yes | Yes | |
| 2019 | Puppy | Yes | Yes | |
| 2019 | 50/50 | Yes | Yes | |
| 2020 | Irandam Kuththu | Yes | No | |
| 2021 | Devadas Brothers | Yes | Yes | |
| 2021 | Naduvan | Yes | Yes | |
| 2021 | Murungakkai Chips | Yes | Yes | |
| 2022 | Pistha | Yes | Yes | |
| 2022 | Aruvaa Sanda | Yes | Yes | |
| 2022 | Nitham Oru Vaanam | Yes | Yes | 1 song (Promo) |
| 2026 | Made in Korea | Yes | Yes | 1 song |

=== Independent songs ===
| Year | Songs | Notes | Ref. |
|---|---|---|---|
| 2018 | Yaaru Kitta | | |
| 2019 | Rasathi Nenja | | |
| 2020 | Enga Pora De | | |
| 2020 | Paadatha Pattellam | Recreated and Produced | |
| 2021 | Asku Maaro | | |
| 2022 | Aaruyir Ayyappa | | |
| 2022 | Dhama Thundu | | |

=== Singer ===
Films

| Year | Films | Songs | Notes |
|---|---|---|---|
| 2012 | Podaa Podi | "Hare Rama | |
| 2017 | Kadhal Kasakuthaiya | "Complan Boy" | |
| 2018 | Puppy | "Sothumuttai" | |
| 2018 | Natpuna Ennanu Theriyuma | "Inky Pinky" | |
| 2021 | Devadas Brothers | "Rottula Train", "Soodana Theneer" | |

Music video

- Asku Maaro (2021)
