= Kjell Kjær =

Norwegian actor, puppeteer, director and program host (1942–2025)

- Born: February 1, 1942; Stockholm, Sweden
- Died: January 8, 2025 (aged 82)
- Occupation(s): Actor, puppeteer, director, and program host

Kjell Kjær (February 1, 1942 – January 8, 2025) was a Norwegian film actor, puppeteer, director, and program host. He also performed as a stage actor, including at the National Theater in Oslo.

== Puppet theater ==
In 1968, Kjell Kjær participated as a puppeteer in a production of Mikko Matti og vennene hans (Mikko Matti and His Friends), for which Julian and Birgit Strøm were responsible. Frøydis Armand and Elisabeth Strøm Henriksen also took part on stage.

In 1979, he participated in NRK Television Theater's production of the play Sella-re-atag (Gata-er-alles). The production was a collaboration between NRK and Musidra Theatre. The play Sella-re-atag was a further development of Musidra's puppet theater performance Hjemmebarn og Fremmedbarn from the same year. The director was Helge Reistad.

== Filmography ==
- 1974: Fleksnes Fataliteter (TV series): "Trafikk og panikk" as Gunvald, a man from Viking
- 1975: Faneflukt as a refugee
- 1976: Farlig yrke (TV series) as Bjørn Eide
- 1978: Det andre skiftet as the narrator
- 1988: Fleksnes Fataliteter (TV series): "En siste sjanse" as Gunvald, a man from Viking
