= Dashcam (2021 horror film) =

2021 film by Rob Savage

- Theatrical release poster
- Directed by: Rob Savage
- Written by: Gemma Hurley; Rob Savage; Jed Shepherd
- Produced by: Jason Blum; Douglas Cox; Rob Savage
- Starring: Annie Hardy; Amar Chadha-Patel; Angela Enahoro
- Edited by: Brenna Rangott
- Production companies: Blumhouse Productions; Shadowhouse Films; BOO-URNS
- Distributed by: Momentum Pictures
- Release dates: September 13, 2021 (Toronto International Film Festival); October 14, 2021 (BFI London Film Festival); June 3, 2022 (United Kingdom, United States)
- Running time: 79 minutes
- Countries: United Kingdom; United States
- Language: English
- Budget: $100,000
- Box office: $70,585

Dashcam (stylised in all caps) is a 2021 supernatural horror film directed by Rob Savage, who co-wrote the screenplay with Gemma Hurley and Jed Shepherd. It stars Annie Hardy, Amar Chadha-Patel, and Angela Enahoro, and follows a semi-fictionalized version of Hardy who leaves Los Angeles for a surprise visit to her former bandmate in London during the COVID-19 pandemic, only to find herself in a series of nightmarish events after agreeing to escort a strange elderly woman to a secret location in her friend's car.

A screenlife film, Dashcam is presented entirely from the perspective of Hardy's iPhone as she livestreams her actions for viewers. The film was produced by Jason Blum through his company Blumhouse Productions, Savage through his company BOO-URNS, and Douglas Cox through Shadowhouse Films. Savage and Shepherd developed the idea for Dashcam based on Hardy's livestreamed YouTube series Band Car, in which she would work out song ideas in real-time with viewers while driving around Los Angeles. Savage felt the concept would make for a good found footage horror film, and ultimately asked Hardy to star in it.

Dashcam had its world premiere at the 2021 Toronto International Film Festival, where it was a runner-up for the People's Choice Award: Midnight Madness. It was released theatrically by Momentum Pictures in the United Kingdom and the United States on June 3, 2022. It grossed $70,585, and received mixed reviews; its scariness, visual format, and provocative themes were praised, but most felt its effectiveness was undermined by Hardy's character being too grating and unlikeable.

== Plot ==
American musician and conservative conspiracy theorist Annie livestreams while driving her car, where she creates music on the spot with comments from the live chat being used as lyrics. Tired of COVID-19 pandemic restrictions and homelessness in Los Angeles, she flies to London for a surprise visit to her friend and former bandmate Stretch, who now works as a food delivery driver. Stretch's girlfriend Gemma immediately clashes with Annie over politics and social issues. Annie accompanies Stretch on a delivery job, where she antagonizes restaurant owners with her anti-mask views.

Annie refuses to remove her MAGA hat when she and Stretch return home, prompting Gemma to attack her. That night, after she overhears Gemma urging Stretch to kick her out, Annie steals Stretch's car and phone before accepting a delivery job meant for him. She arrives at a closed restaurant, where the owner offers her money to transport an elderly woman named Angela to an address she has written down. Angela soils herself, forcing Annie to stop at a diner, where she is surprised to see a tattoo of Ariana Grande on Angela's stomach. A woman enters to look for Angela and attacks Annie, who flees the diner with Angela.

Stretch tracks Annie down via her livestream and forces his way into the car. The two argue and pull over, after which Angela vanishes. Stretch finds her standing on top of a tree in a nearby forest, but falls from the tree whilst trying to reach her, followed by Angela slowly floating to the ground. The woman from the diner returns with a shotgun and attempts to kill Annie and Stretch, who escape in the car with Angela. They remove Angela's face mask to find that her mouth is stapled shut.

Annie and Stretch attempt to flag down a passing car, which runs over Stretch. The driver reveals herself as the woman from the diner and claims to be the mother of Angela, whom she says is actually 16 years old, which she then proves by showing Annie a picture of a young Angela with the same tattoo on her stomach. Annie tries to drive away in the woman's car, but crashes it and is attacked by the woman. Stretch recovers and helps Annie trap the woman's arm in the steering wheel, accidentally snapping it. Angela appears, rips her mother's head off, and pursues Annie and Stretch as they flee.

Angela chases Annie and Stretch into an abandoned amusement park, where she finds and kills Stretch. Annie escapes in a car, but Angela causes her to crash. Angela pushes the car into a lake with her telekinetic powers, but Annie traps her in the car and swims to the shore as the car sinks, though she fails to notice Angela silently rising from the lake and into the sky behind her. Annie finds a remote house, which she recognizes as the destination to which she was asked to escort Angela. Inside the house, she finds occult symbols and cult members who slash their own throats and die in front of her. Angela attacks Annie, who kills her with a cult member's knife; a large, slug-like, humanoid creature emerges from Angela's mouth and chases Annie, who finds Stretch's car and takes her keyboard from the back seat before beating the creature to death with it. She then collapses into Stretch's car and resumes her livestream, where she improvises a rap about her experience before coughing.

== Cast ==
- Annie Hardy as Annie
- Amar Chadha-Patel as Stretch
- Angela Enahoro as Angela
  - Faith Kiggundu as Young Angela (photo)
- Mogali Masuku as Angela's Mother
- James Swanton as The Parasite
- Jemma Moore as Gemma
- Seylan Baxter as Seylan
- Caroline Ward as The Bride
- Edward Linard as The Groom
- Emma Louise Webb as Flight Attendant (voice)
- Haley Bishop as Flight Announcer (voice)
- Radina Drandova as Emergency Responder

== Production ==
=== Development ===
Dashcam developed by Rob Savage and Jed Shepherd, who initially came up with the idea based on Annie Hardy's series Band Car, livestreamed YouTube videos in which she would work out song ideas while driving around Los Angeles. Savage said, "When [Shepherd] showed me the show, the first conversations were like, 'Oh, that's a cool set-up for a found footage movie.' [...] The version we were taking around pre-Host was very much just using the Band Car set-up, but the idea was to probably take it to studios, to probably try and get an actor to play that role." Savage eventually asked Hardy to star in the film.

The film is an international co-production between the United Kingdom and the United States, and was produced on a budget of approximately $100,000.

=== Filming ===
Principal photography took place around Margate in late 2020, with the amusement park scenes shot at Dreamland Margate. Hardy spent her free time during production at the Albion Rooms, a hotel and recording studio owned by The Libertines, where she simultaneously recorded material for her band Giant Drag.

The film features references to Savage's previous film Host (2020), such as viewers in Annie's live chat discussing the astral plane. It also features the primary cast of Host in small roles; Jemma Moore plays Stretch's girlfriend Gemma, James Swanton (who portrayed the demon in Host) portrays the monster, Seylan Baxter plays the restaurant owner who tasks Annie with transporting Angela, Haley Bishop voices the flight announcer at Los Angeles International Airport, Emma Louise Webb voices cabin crew on Annie's flight, Radina Drandova plays an emergency responder, and Caroline Ward and Edward Linard portray newlyweds who are accidentally killed by Stretch. Ward and Linard's characters also die in the same way as their characters in Host, the former from blunt force trauma and the latter burning to death.

== Music ==
To promote the film, Hardy's band, Giant Drag, released the song "Devil Inside" in June 2022. The song is featured in the film's closing credits.

== Release ==
Dashcam premiered at the 2021 Toronto International Film Festival on September 13, 2021 as part of the festival's Midnight Madness section, followed by a British premiere at the BFI London Film Festival on October 14, 2021. In February 2022, Momentum Pictures purchased the distribution rights for the film.

=== Home media ===
Momentum Pictures and Universal Pictures Home Entertainment released Dashcam on DVD on July 12, 2022, featuring an audio commentary with Savage and Hardy. Town View Productions released a Blu-ray edition of the film in Japan on December 6, 2023, which contains behind-the-scenes footage and an interview with Savage.

== Reception ==
On Rotten Tomatoes, the film holds an approval rating of 46% based on 90 reviews, with an average rating of 5.1/10. The critical consensus reads, "Dashcam is visually and thematically provocative, although the film's grating protagonist undercuts its effectiveness." On Metacritic, the film has a weighted average score of 48 out of 100, based on 23 critics, indicating "mixed or average" reviews.

Clarisse Loughry of The Independent praised the film and said, "[It's] a riot. Sure, it's a film whose spell I can imagine being instantly broken the second you remove it from the precise context it was made for—in a cinema, with as large an audience as possible, all of them hooting and hollering—but that should hardly be counted as a mark against it. If anything, it's proof that Savage knows exactly the kind of film he's making. Dashcam is pure chaos, headlined by a character with a maelstrom for a personality."

Dennis Harvey of Variety gave the film a middling review and noted, "As a showcase for [Hardy], Dashcam may be a little too much of a good thing—she's an acting natural, but this character is so vividly irksome it turns the whole film into a sort of deliberately off-putting standup routine. Dashcam feels longer than the bare 66 minutes it logs pre-final credits. It's a clever stunt—still, not so clever that it can't wear out its welcome."
