= Jingan =

Jingan may refer to:

- Jing'an County (靖安县), in Jiangxi, People's Republic of China
- Jing'an District (静安区), in Shanghai, PRC
- Jing'an Temple (静安寺), in Shanghai, PRC
- Jingan Station (景安站), station of the Taipei Metro, in New Taipei, Taiwan
- Jing'an, Changli County (靖安镇), town in Changli County, Hebei, PRC
- Jingan Young (楊靜安), an award-winning writer from Hong Kong
