= Amar Chadha-Patel =

British actor and musician (born 1986)

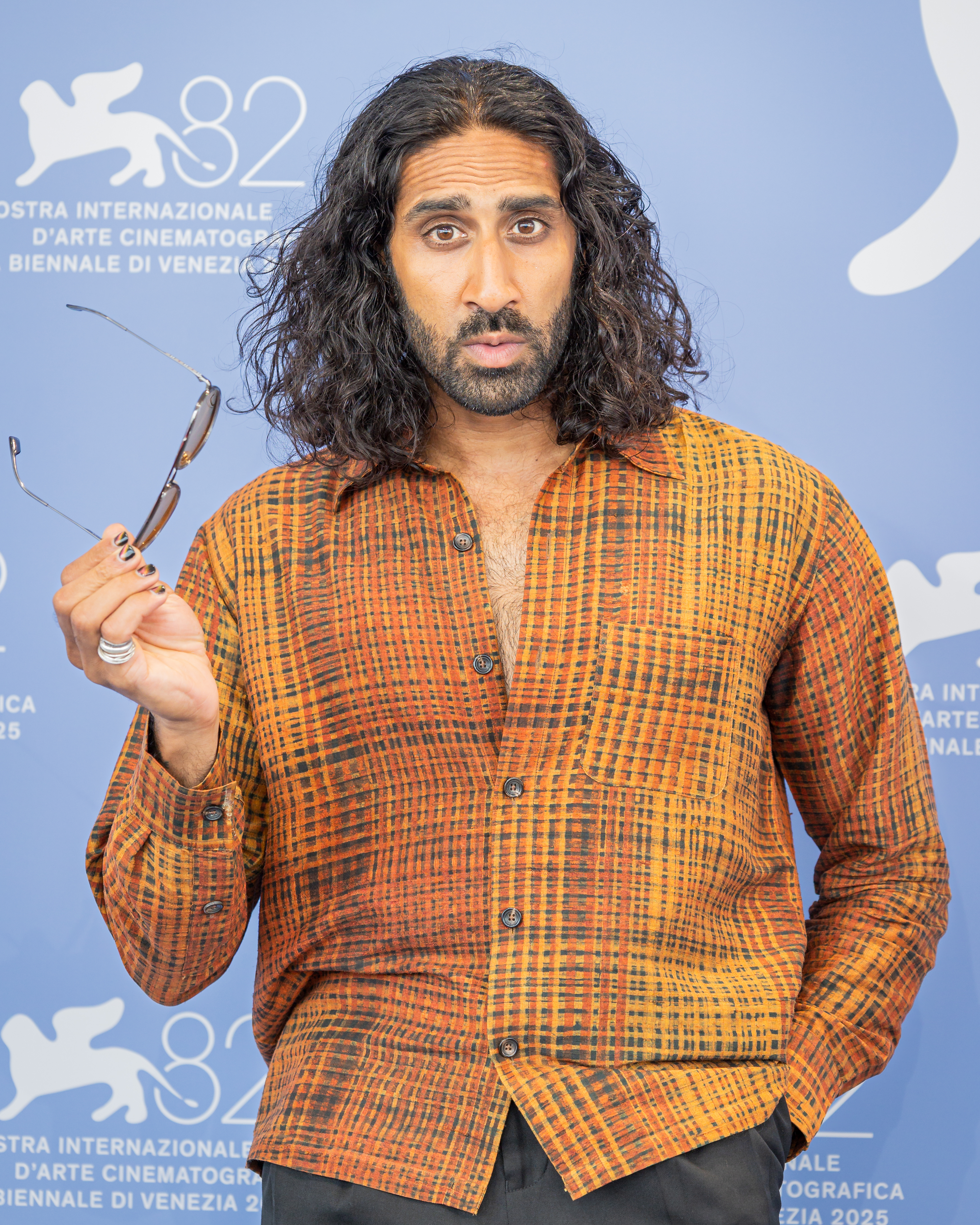
- Chadha-Patel in 2025
- Born: 3 June 1986 (age 39)
- Other name: Amer Chadha-Patel
- Years active: 1993–present

Amar (or Amer) Chadha-Patel (born 3 June 1986) is a British actor, filmmaker, and musician. On television, he is known for his roles in the ITV drama Beecham House (2019), the Disney+ series Willow (2022), the Roku comedy Slip (2023), and the Netflix series The Decameron (2024). His films include Dashcam (2021) and The Creator (2023). He is a member of the band Strong Asian Mothers and the directing collective Tom & Amar.

== Early life ==
Chadha-Patel grew up between Highbury in North London and Hackney in East London, while his grandparents lived in a Punjabi Sikh community in West London. He was 29 when he decided to go into acting.

== Career ==
In 2012, Chadha-Patel formed an indie electro music band called Strong Asian Mothers with his friends Kalim "Khushi" Patel and Josh "Rogan-Josh" Stadlen. They self-released their debut EP Lynx Africa in 2016.

Chadha-Patel has directed commercials and fashion campaigns for the likes of ASOS, AllSaints, and L'Oreal. His film A Brave New Love for The Kooples won Best Cinematography at the 2015 London Fashion Film Festival, in addition to being nominated for Best Editing and Best Major Brand Production. Chadha-Patel formed a directing collective with Tom Allen under the name Tom & Amar; Tom & Amar directed the music video for Strong Asian Mothers' 2017 single "Hard to Find".

Chadha-Patel made his television debut in 2019 when he played the main role of Ram Lal in the ITV historical drama Beecham House and the recurring role of Detective Sergeant Keith in the 2019 Channel 4 sitcom Year of the Rabbit. He also appeared in the film Doom: Annihilation and had soundtrack credits as a DJ on Gurinder Chadha's Blinded by the Light. The following year, he had a recurring role in the Sky Atlantic and HBO series The Third Day.

In 2021, Chadha-Patel starred in the horror film Dashcam and had small roles in episodes of the Netflix series Sex Education and Amazon Prime series The Wheel of Time. He also co-wrote and edited the short film Behind the Mask for director Simon Matthews. During Disney+ Day 2021, it was announced Chadha-Patel had joined the cast of the series Willow, which premiered in 2022. Chadha-Patel starred as Thraxus Boorman. In 2023, he played Eric in the Roku comedy series Slip and Rusty Raj in the Amazon Prime tennis series Fifteen-Love, and appeared in the Gareth Edwards' science fiction film The Creator (originally titled True Love). For the former, he received a joint Canadian Screen Award nomination with Zoe Lister-Jones and Tymika Tafari in the Comedy Ensemble category.

Chadha-Patel starred as Dioneo, a doctor in the 2024 Netflix medieval dark comedy The Decameron. He has a role in the film William Tell.

== Filmography ==
=== Film ===
Year	Title	Role	Notes
1993	Bhaji on the Beach	Amrik	Credited as Amer Chadha-Patel
2010	It's a Wonderful Afterlife	Speed Dating Man #4	Credited as Amer Chadha-Patel
2015	A Brave New Love	—N/a	Director
2016	Army of One	Osama bin Laden	Credited as Amer Chadha-Patel
2019	Blinded by the Light	DJ	Uncredited
2019	Aladdin	Palace Guard	Credited as Amer Chadha-Patel
2019	Doom: Annihilation	Pvt. Rance Redguo	Credited as Amer Chadha-Patel
2021	Dashcam	Stretch	
2023	The Creator	Omni / SEK-ON / Sergeant Bui	
2024	William Tell	Furst	
2025	Motor City		

=== Television ===
Year	Title	Role	Notes
2019	Year of the Rabbit	Detective Sergeant Keith	5 episodes
2019	Beecham House	Ram Lal	Main role
2020	The Windsors	Ash	Episode #3.2
2020	Flack	Deepak	Episode: "Danny & Deepak"
2020	The Third Day	Preacher	5 episodes
2021	BBC Laugh Lessons	—N/a	Writer, director; episode: "Toxic Ting"
2021	Sex Education	DJ Dave	Episode: "Episode 1"
2021	The Wheel of Time	Lord Yakota	2 episodes
2022–2023	Willow	Thraxus Boorman	Main role
2023	Slip	Eric	4 episodes
2023	Fifteen-Love	Rushikesh "Rusty" Raj	Main role
2024	The Decameron	Dioneo	8 episodes

=== Video games ===
- House Hack (2021) as Barney

=== Music videos ===
- "Budapest" (2014), George Ezra

== Awards and nominations ==
Year	Award	Category	Work	Result	Ref.
2015	London Fashion Film Festival	Best Cinematography	A Brave New Love	Won	
2015	London Fashion Film Festival	Best Editing	A Brave New Love	Nominated	
2015	London Fashion Film Festival	Best Major Brand Production	A Brave New Love	Won	
2024	Canadian Screen Awards	Ensemble Performance, Comedy Series	Slip	Nominated	(Note: Shared with Zoe Lister-Jones and Tymika Tafari)
