= The Malay Chronicles: Bloodlines =

The Malay Chronicles: Bloodlines Hikayat Merong Mahawangsa
- Directed by: Yusry Abdul Halim
- Written by: Yusry Abdul Halim; Amir Hafizi
- Based on: Hikayat Merong Mahawangsa
- Produced by: Norman Abdul Halim; Edry Abdul Halim; Johan Lucas; Amaludin Syukri
- Starring: Stephen Rahman-Hughes; Jing Lusi; Gavin Stenhouse; Khir Rahman; Craig Fong; Maya Karin
- Cinematography: Mohd. Nor
- Music by: Edry Abdul Halim
- Distributed by: Malaysia: KRU Studios; International: Epic Pictures
- Release date: 10 March 2011
- Running time: 110 minutes
- Country: Malaysia
- Languages: Malay; English; Mandarin
- Budget: US$2.2 million
- Box office: US$6.3 million

The Malay Chronicles: Bloodlines (also called Clash of Empires: The Battle for Asia in the United Kingdom) is a 2011 Malaysian Malay-language epic action adventure film loosely based on the late 18th or 19th century document Hikayat Merong Mahawangsa (Kedah Annals), which is also its title as released in Malaysia (Hikayat Merong Mahawangsa). The film is directed, co-written, and co-produced by Yusry Abdul Halim. The film stars Stephen Rahman-Hughes as Merong Mahawangsa, who escorts Prince Marcus Carprenius of the Roman Empire to Langkasuka to marry Princess Meng Li Hua from the Han Dynasty of China, thus uniting the two powers of East and West. The film was produced and distributed by KRU Studios.

The film was released to Malaysian cinemas nationwide beginning on 10 March 2011. The film won eight out of its 13 nominations in the 24th Malaysia Film Festival in the same year, including the category for Best Film.

== Plot ==
In the second century AD, the powerful Roman Empire has agreed to form an alliance with the Han Dynasty by marrying their prince and princess. However, the Roman Emperor's son Marcus Carprenius (Gavin Stenhouse) opposes the decision as he will only be used as a pawn in the two countries' political schemes so he tries to sail away. The Chinese princess Meng Li Hua (Jing Lusi) also wants to be free and does the same by fleeing to a mysterious peninsula with her handmaiden Ying Ying.

After barely surviving a storm, the Roman fleet lands on the coast of Western India. Upon arrival, Marcus and his entourage are greeted by a local dealer who introduces them to Merong Mahawangsa (Stephen Rahman-Hughes), a smuggler who claims to be the descendant of the Greek king Alexander the Great. After watching Merong fight and defeat Sunder, a nobleman who holds Merong responsible for having an affair with his sister, Marcus is impressed and he recruits Merong to guide him to the mysterious peninsula while Admiral Lycius sails back to Rome to get new ships and a reward for Merong for helping the prince.

Merong and Marcus arrive in the peninsula where they meet the Chinese Admiral Liu Yun (Craig Robert Fong). One night, Marcus meets Meng for the first time and they quickly fall in love as they discover that they both share the same goal of being free. The next morning, the Chinese and the Romans are attacked by a pirate confederation tribe called Garuda led by a sorcerer named Taji (Wan Hanafi Su). Meng and Ying Ying are kidnapped by the Garuda while Marcus tries in vain to save them. Heavily outnumbered, the Chinese and the Romans are defeated. Enraged by Marcus' apparent death, the battle turn into a bloodbath. The enraged Austronesian slaughters most of the Garuda fighters before he is knocked out.

Merong is nursed back to health by a tribal leader named Kesum (Rahim Razali) and Embok (Ummi Nazeera). Merong learns from Kesum that he and Taji were once students of a great warrior mage who wore an amulet of immortality. Desiring the amulet, Taji betrayed and killed the mage, and then he led a small band of pirates to raid the villages. Among Taji's victims were Merong's mother Lang (Umie Aida) and Embok herself. Merong also learns of a prophecy that a great warrior will unite all the peninsula's tribes into one kingdom to defeat their enemies. Merong then becomes Kesum's student and begins uniting the tribes, fulfilling the prophecy in the process. On the Garuda's island, Meng and Ying Ying are held captives by Taji and his pirates. During their attempt to escape, Meng and Ying Ying manage to steal the amulet of immortality. Meanwhile, after uniting all the tribes, Merong creates the kingdom of Langkasuka. Merong then reunites with Liu Yun, a recovering Marcus, and a small group of Chinese soldiers. Together, they set off to rescue Meng and Ying Ying from the Garuda. Before launching the attack, Embok confesses her love for Merong.

The next morning, Merong and his army begin their attack on the Garuda horde. Though heavily outnumbered, Merong sets all the Garuda ships on fire using a ship loaded with mirrors to reflect the sunlight. Taji then uses sorcery to unleash a powerful storm that covers the sun, rendering the weapon useless. Merong and his army fight the Garuda on the beach during which Liu Yun sacrifices himself to save Marcus. As the Garuda surround Merong's army, the Sino-Roman armada led by Lycius arrives and turns the tide, routing the Garuda horde in the process. As the battle ends in a Sino-Roman victory, Merong kills Taji in a fierce duel but at the cost of his life.

Many years after the great battle, Sultan Mudzafar Shah, the first Sultan of Kedah, chronicles the history of Merong Mahawangsa in the Kedah Annals to honor his memory and heroic deeds.

== Cast ==
- Stephen Rahman-Hughes as Merong Mahawangsa.

=== The Roman delegation ===
- Gavin Stenhouse as Marcus Carprenius, Prince of the Roman Empire.
- Eric Karl Henrik Norman as Lycius, Admiral of Rome.

=== The Chinese delegation ===
- Jing Lusi as Meng Li Hua, Princess of the Han Dynasty.
- Craig Fong as Liu Yun, Admiral of China.
- Nell Ng as Ying Ying, Meng Li Hua's close and personal friend
- Keith Chong as the Emperor of China.

=== Pirates of Garuda ===
The Garuda in the original tale is depicted as a gigantic bird-like creature whereas the film—due to limitations of the technology needed to recreate the bird—instead portrays it as a different entity, particularly a pirate tribe nation with its own island.

- Wan Hanafi Su as Taji, The leader of the pirate clan of Geruda. (The name Taji, meaning 'spur' or 'talon' in Malay, alludes to the Garuda.)
- Khir Rahman as Kamawas, Taji's student who kidnaps Princess Meng Li Hua. (His name is derived from the word mawas or 'ape', an allusion to Hanuman.)

=== The village people ===
- Rahim Razali as Kesum, a Malay medicine man who knew Merong since he was young.
- Ummi Nazeera as Embok, a nurse and also Merong's lover.

=== Other characters ===
- Hafizuddin Fadzil as Sultan Mudzafar Shah or Phra Ong Mahawangsa, the narrator of the story.
- Mano Maniam as the local Goan dealer.
- Ravi Sunderlingam as Sunder, the Goan warrior.
- Deborah Priya Henry as Yasodharā, the wife of Siddhārtha Gautama.
- Jehan Miskin as Embi, the Malay warrior.
- Umie Aida as Lang, Merong Mahawangsa's mother as seen from a flashback
- Maya Karin as Goan Villager

== Production ==
=== Music ===
The film's music score was initially composed by Reza Ramsey and Yudi Ashady before they underwent re-arrangements to be played by the Malaysian Philharmonic Orchestra under the direction of Claus Peter Flor.

Anuar Zain sings the theme song for the film, titled "Sedetik Lebih", which was composed by Edry Abdul Halim.

== Release ==
The first official trailer was released in October 2010. The production was completed several months later. KRU Studios later announced that the film would be screened in the cinemas on 11 March 2011.

This film was shown for the first time during a royal audience with the Sultan of Kedah, Abdul Halim Muadzam Shah and his family on 25 February 2011 prior to a nationwide release in March of the same year. A 30-minute making-of programme was broadcast on Malaysian TV station TV3 as part of the promotion, showing various elements of the production behind the scenes and also exclusive interviews with the cast and the crew.

The film was later made available on the on-demand service Astro First on 21 April 2011. The DVD was also released on the same day. It was eventually released on the Blu-ray format in the United Kingdom on 23 May, becoming the first Malaysian-made feature film to do so.

After its release in Malaysia, Singapore and Brunei; the United Kingdom was the next country to screen the film. The film was released there under the title Clash of Empires: Battle for Asia.

=== Home media ===
Hikayat Merong Mahawangsa was released in the DVD format on 21 April 2011 in Malaysia. In the United Kingdom, the film was released on Blu-ray and DVD under the title Clash of Empires: Battle for Asia on 23 May 2011. Its British release makes it the second Malaysian film to be released on Blu-ray after Ice Kacang Puppy Love which was released in Hong Kong.

== Reception ==
=== Box office ===
Following its Malaysian release, the film grossed MYR 6.3 million at the box office (only in Malaysia) by the end of March 2011, making the film the most successful local epic film.
