= Craig Fong =

Australian actor

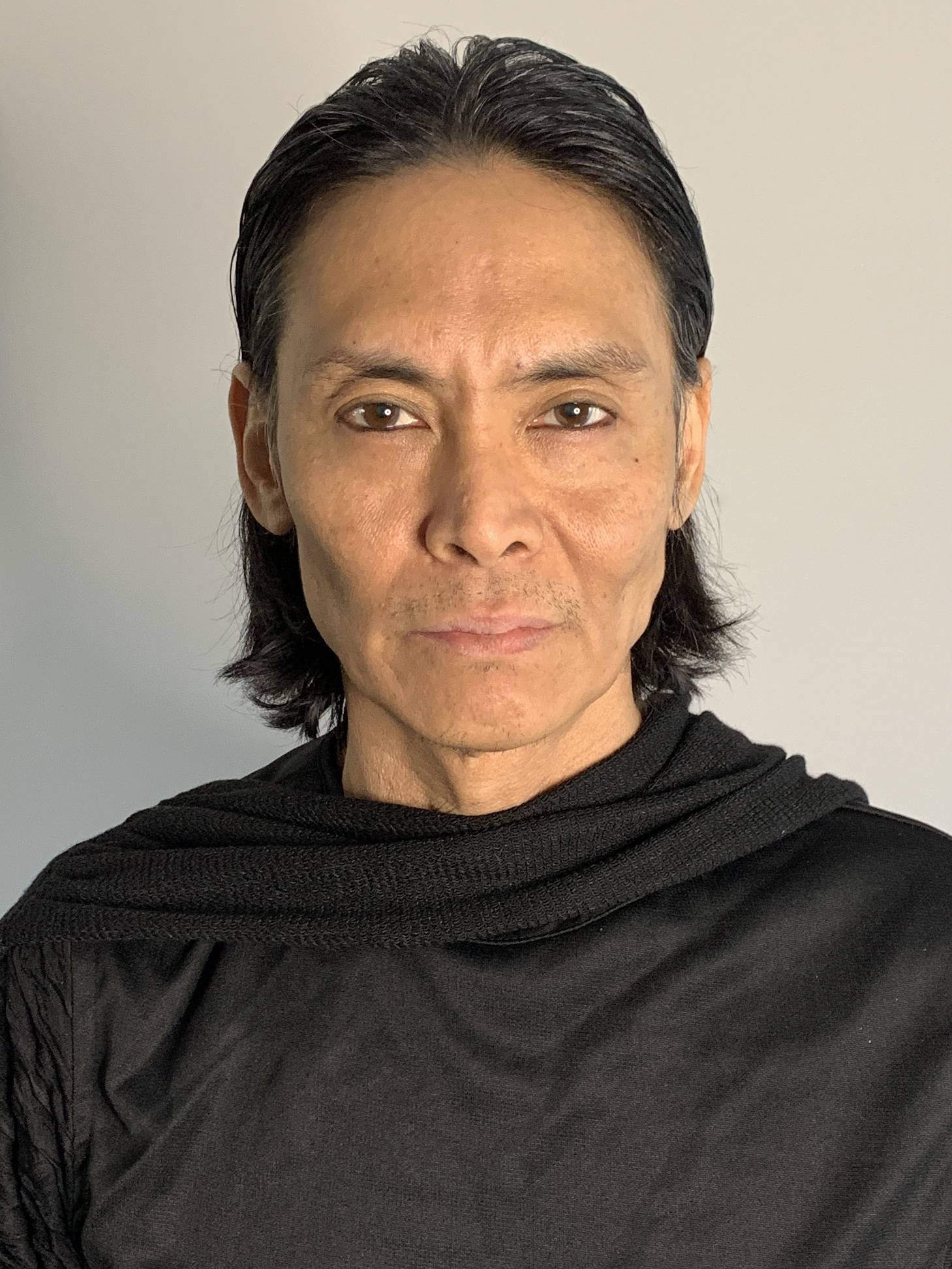
- Born: Craig Robert Fong; Carnarvon, Western Australia, Australia
- Education: Central Institute of Technology
- Occupations: Actor, author
- Website: craigfong.com

Craig Robert Fong is an Australian actor.

== Early life and education ==
Fong was born in Carnarvon, Western Australia and grew up in a fairly isolated outback environment. At the age of 15 he moved to Perth to continue his studies at Rossmoyne Senior High School. As there were no drama classes at the school, he studied photography, with the intention of eventually becoming a film director.

After high school, Fong enrolled at the Central Institute of Technology in Perth, majoring in film production and animation in a three-year course. During this time, he won an award for Best Television Commercial and also made a short film which won the leading actor, Matt Thompson, Best Male Actor at the 1991 Film and Television Institute (FTI) Awards in Fremantle. In 1992, Fong's film was nominated for Best Documentary at the FTI Awards.

He was then cast in his first television commercial for Western Australian Tourism.

== Career ==
Fong moved Sydney to pursue an acting career. He was an extra on Thank God He Met Lizzie and Hart to Hart Down Under, and was featured in a Crowded House music video, Instinct.

He then travelled to Singapore, where he did some fashion modelling, and then Malaysia. There he got a part in the Hollywood movie Entrapment, starring Catherine Zeta-Jones and Sean Connery.

In 1999 Fong was cast in his first lead role in an independent film Spinning Gasing portraying Harry, a young musician who is caught between culture, religion and love.

Fong returned to Singapore for two years, to work in telemovies with longtime friend and director Kabir Bhatia, in the films On the Wings of Butterflies (playing a Japanese soldier who falls in love with a local Chinese Singaporean girl during World War II), and Full Circle.

Returning to Perth, Fong met playwright John Aitken, and was cast in various roles on stage. For his role as a doppelgänger in Lost is my Quiet, he was awarded Best Supporting Actor at the 8th Annual Equity Guild Awards in October 2007, in Western Australia. Also in 2007, he played the character Bao Tang in the Australian crime thriller film, Without Warrant.

In June 2009, Fong was cast in the Malaysian epic feature film Hikayat Merong Mahawangsa (also known internationally as The Malay Chronicles: Bloodlines, and in the television series Wadi Unung, for Astro Prima. He then played Japanese Lieutenant Tanaka. The Astro Citra miniseries, directed by Kabir Bhatia, based on the Japanese occupation of South-East Asia, particularly the Sandakan Death Marches.

He has acted many European films, including A World Beyond (2013), and the German film about endangered orangutans Lost in Borneo (2012), starring Hannes Jaenicke and Mirjam Weichselbraun.

Fong played Andy Chow in The Hong Kong Affair (2013) with German actress Veronica Ferres, who was also co-producer.

In November 2011, Fong was nominated for Best Supporting Actor for The Malay Chronicles: Bloodlines at the Anugerah Skrin in Malaysia.

In 2013 Fong teamed up once again with writer and director Kabir Bhatia on Gila Baby and starred in the Malaysian drama film Cuak. In March 2013, he appeared in Das Traumschiff, one of Germany's long-running television series, filmed in and around Kuala Lumpur and Langkawi, playing the character Beto.

Fong played the role of Benny in The Heights by Matchbox Pictures for ABC Television and the US NBC network.

In January 2020, filming began for the feature film Talbis Iblis (The Devil's Deception), directed by Kabir Bhatia.

Fong had a role in the 2022 Australian series, Mystery Road: Origin, directed by Dylan River and starring Mark Coles Smith for Bunya Productions.

== Filmography ==
=== Film ===
| Year | Title | Role | Notes |
|---|---|---|---|
| 1999 | Spinning Gasing | Harry Lee | |
| 1999 | Entrapment | Gangster | |
| 2009 | The Line | Bao Tang | |
| 2011 | The Malay Chronicles: Bloodlines | Admiral Lui Yun | |
| 2011 | Akinabalu The Movie | Lieutenant Tanaka | |
| 2014 | Cuak | The Man in Blue | |
| 2014 | Gila Baby | Mongol | |
| 2022 | Talbis Iblis | Jembalang | |

=== Television ===
| Year | Title | Role | Notes |
|---|---|---|---|
| 2003 | Kopitiam | William | 3 episodes |
| 2004 | Bully | Daniel Lum | |
| 2005 | On The Wings Of A Butterfly | Kenji | |
| 2010 | Wadi Unung | Karl Vincent | 24 episodes |
| 2011 | Crossings | Corporal Kanada | |
| 2011 | Akinabalu | Lieutenant Tanaka | 8 episodes |
| 2012 | Lost in Borneo | Sapto Setiawan | |
| 2013 | A World Beyond | Tojo Murakami | |
| 2013 | The Hong Kong Affair | Andy Chow | |
| 2013 | What If | | |
| 2019 | The Heights | Benny | 9 episodes |
| 2022 | Mystery Road: Origin | Investor | 2 episodes |

Theatre
| Year | Production | Playwright | Role | Notes |
|---|---|---|---|---|
| 2005 | Imperial Facade | John Aitken | Princess Wing Lee | |
| 2007 | Lost Is My Quiet | John Aitken | Simon Brewster | |
| 2006 | Ships Pass Quietly | John Aitken | Yuri | |

== Publications ==
- Fong, Craig, 1970- (2002), The adventures of Jerry and Jane, Peaceful Country Publications, ISBN 0957827504
