= Red Eye (British TV series) =

British television series

- Promotional poster for Series 1
- Genre: Crime thriller Political thriller
- Created by: Peter A Dowling
- Written by: Peter A Dowling; Jingan Young
- Screenplay by: Peter A Dowling
- Directed by: Kieron Hawkes; Camilla Strøm Henriksen
- Starring: Jing Lusi; Richard Armitage; Lesley Sharp; Jemma Moore; Martin Compston
- Composer: Ian Arber
- Country of origin: United Kingdom
- Original language: English
- No. of series: 2
- No. of episodes: 12

Production
- Executive producers: Peter A Dowling; Julie Gardner; Lachlan Mackinnon
- Producers: Kristian Dench; Letitia Knight
- Cinematography: Oli Russell
- Editors: Josh Cunliffe; Emma Marie Cramb
- Production companies: Bad Wolf; Sony Pictures Television

Original release
- Network: ITV; ITVX
- Release: 21 April 2024 – present

Red Eye is a British thriller television series, created by Peter A Dowling and starring Jing Lusi, Richard Armitage, Jemma Moore and Lesley Sharp. It premiered on ITV1 and ITVX on 21 April 2024.

A second series, Red Eye: Crimson Icarus, was announced in September 2024, with Lusi, Moore, Sharp and Armitage returning, and Martin Compston joining the cast. It premiered on ITV1 and ITVX on 1 January 2026.

== Premise ==
The first series takes place during an all-night flight between London and Beijing after a British man is extradited to China on suspicion of manslaughter.

== Cast ==
=== Main ===
- Jing Lusi as Hana Li, a Hong Kong born Detective Constable (later Detective Sergeant) in the Metropolitan Police
- Richard Armitage as Dr. Matthew Nolan (series 1, guest series 2), a vascular surgeon
- Lesley Sharp as Madeline Delaney, the Director-General of MI5
- Jemma Moore as Jess Li, a journalist and Hana's younger half-sister
- Jonathan Aris as John Tennant, a senior MI6 official and later Director-General of the Homeland Security Group
- Cash Holland as Ruth Banks, an MI5 official
- Steph Lacey as Megan Campbell, an MI5 analyst
- Robert Gilbert as Supt. Simon O'Brian, Hana's boss at the Met Police

=== Series 1 ===
- Dan Li as Toni Zhang, a Chinese sky marshal
- Tai Yin Chan as Rén Yúnxi, a flight attendant on North China Air Flight 357
- Thomas Chaanhing as Chén, the Captain and pilot of North China Air Flight 357
- Mido Hamada as Mike Maxwell, the London CIA Station Chief
- Aidan Cheng as Wú, the First Officer and co-pilot of North China Air Flight 357
- Lucianne McEvoy as Kate Ward, a colleague of Dr Nolan
- Xiangyi Tan as Tiffany Songyun, a flight attendant on North China Air Flight 357
- Parker Sawyers as Eric Jones, a CIA SAD/SOG operative
- Daphne Cheung as Mrs Ruan Yue, a North China Air Flight 357 passenger
- Elaine Tan as Shen Zhào, a Chinese national involved with Nolan
- Peter Guinness as Sir George Chapman, a veteran spy posing as CEO of World Pacific Medicine

=== Series 2 ===
- Martin Compston as Clay Brody, a Scottish-American DSS Regional Security Officer at the US Embassy in London and former SAS soldier
- Nicholas Rowe as Alex Peterson, the UK Defence Secretary
- Trevor White as Ronald Tillman, the newly appointed US Ambassador to the UK and former CEO of AM Aeronautics
- Sarah Junillon as Liv Lewis, a new DSS agent at the US Embassy in London
- Tom Forbes as Fox, an assassin

== Episodes ==
=== Series overview ===
Series	Episodes	Originally released		Average UK viewers (millions)
Series	Episodes	First released	Last released	Average UK viewers (millions)
1	6	21 April 2024	26 May 2024	6.46
2	6	1 January 2026	12 January 2026	TBA

=== Series 1 (2024) ===
Series 1 follows Detective Constable Hana Li (played by Jing Lusi), a Metropolitan Police officer tasked with escorting British doctor Matthew Nolan (played by Richard Armitage) on an overnight flight from London to Beijing after he is accused of murder in China. As events unfold on board the aircraft, Hana is drawn into a wider conspiracy, while MI5 Director General Madeline Delaney (played by Lesley Sharp) and Hana's journalist sister Jess (played by Jemma Moore) pursue leads on the ground.

The six-part series premiered on ITV1 and ITVX on 21 April 2024.

No.	Title	Directed by	Written by	Original release date	UK viewers (millions)
1	"Episode 1"	Kieron Hawkes	Peter A Dowling	21 April 2024	6.05
Surgeon Matthew Nolan goes to a medical conference in Beijing, where he narrowly escapes a life-threatening situation at a nightclub before crashing his car on the central reservation. Back in London, he is arrested by the UK Border Force and denied basic necessities while strip-searched, revealing a stab wound from the nightclub incident. Accused of having caused the death of a woman named Shen Zhào in Beijing, Nolan is pressured to provide a list of his contacts there. His colleagues who arrive back in London are requested to return to Beijing by the Home Office following China's request, with one colleague abducted by unidentified men when he refuses. MI5 Director-General Madeline Delaney reluctantly agrees to the Chinese trade minister's extradition request due to ongoing negotiations on a Sino-British nuclear power programme. Despite Nolan's denial of the murder allegation, he is extradited to China under the escort of DC Hana Li, though not before he makes a scene in the departure lounge, resulting in a viral video. On the North China Air flight, a passenger dies after consuming a vegan meal intended for Nolan, raising suspicions that someone onboard wants Nolan dead.
2	"Episode 2"	Kieron Hawkes	Peter A Dowling	28 April 2024	6.45
Despite the passenger's death, Captain Chen refuses to turn around the plane and insists on flying to Beijing. Hana comes to accept Nolan's story after a fellow passenger's dog dies after eating some of Nolan's meal. Following clear air turbulence, co-pilot Wu discovers the circuit boards for the plane's flaps have been disabled but Chen hushes up the incident. One of Nolan's colleagues, Dr Steven Hurst, is subsequently found dead with a broken neck. With Nolan's help, Hana ascertains that Steven was murdered. They also join forces with Air Marshall Zhang to investigate Steven's death. Chen forces a reluctant Wu to report the recent deaths as accidents. To complicate matters, Steven's wife, Dr Amber Hurst, assaults Dr Ward for having an affair with her late husband. A grieving Amber convinces Zhang to allow her to spend time with her late husband but is confronted by a stranger. Back in London, Hana's estranged sister Jess sees the viral video of Nolan at the airport being arrested by Hana and launches her own investigation, seeking to publish a news story. She interviews Hana's police superior and learns that Hana is travelling to Beijing. Meanwhile, Delaney's oversight of the Shen Zhào case is complicated by the involvement of MI6 intelligence officer John Tennant.
3	"Episode 3"	Kieron Hawkes	Peter A Dowling	5 May 2024	6.34
Hana and Zhang both ask Nolan to recount the events of the conference. In a flashback, Nolan meets Shen Zhao, the woman he is accused of murdering, at the conference bar. While at a night club, she drugs him. Nolan is attacked by bar security, sustaining a stab wound. Following a car accident, he flees to his hotel, where he staples his wound to stop the bleeding. Back in the present, Amber is found dead in the crew area. While examining Amber's body, Nolan discovers that she sustained similar injuries to Steven. Zhang arrests Dr Ward as a suspect in Steven and Amber's murders. Hana updates Madeline, who fails to convince the Chinese trade minister to recall the plane. After Dr Ward disappears, Hana, Zhang and the crew conduct an extensive search of the passenger compartments. When the search is unsuccessful, Hana and Zhang convince a reluctant Chen to let them search the hold. In London, Jess surveils the office of General Pacific Medicine, the company that organised the conference Nolan and the other doctors attended. She captures video of unidentified government workers raiding the building and flees when discovered. Despite Hana's warnings, she visits the London residence of Sir George Chapman, the CEO of World Pacific Medicine.
4	"Episode 4"	Kieron Hawkes	Jingan Young	12 May 2024	6.40
Aboard the North China Air flight, Hana and Zhang's search of the hold is unsuccessful. Nolan along with Hana and Zhang discover Dr Ward's corpse stuffed into a crew storage compartment. Examining the remains, Nolan finds that her fingers were broken during the assault. With Captain Chen's help, Han and Zhang search the passengers for the murder weapon, believing the murderer is aboard the flight. Nolan also contacts Sir George Chapman, requesting his help once he lands in China. Meanwhile, Chapman questions Jess, who convinces him that she is indeed a trainee journalist. The two are pursued by the sniper Eric Jones, a CIA operative sent to assassinate Chapman. Chapman is killed but Jess escapes and updates Hana about her situation. After discovering CCTV footage of Jess at General Pacific Medicine's headquarters and Chapman's mansion, MI5 Director-General Delaney seeks help from the CIA station chief Mike Maxwell in identifying Jess and learns about her relationship with Hana. Delaney also confronts Tennant, who reveals that World Pacific Medicine was a front organisation for MI6 seeking access to Chinese medical technology. The doctors are unaware that they are unwitting mules for MI6. Elsewhere, police find the remains of a fifth doctor from the conference, who was kidnapped after declining to return to China.
5	"Episode 5"	Kieron Hawkes	Peter A Dowling	19 May 2024	6.66
With Hana's help, Nolan extracts a nano SIM card from his torso wound that was sustained during the bar fight. The SIM card contains files relating to the Anglo-Chinese nuclear deal. Before they can transmit the files to Delaney, a hooded operative sabotages the plane's internet server. Zhang is revealed to be colluding with the hooded operative, who murdered the other three doctors during the flight. During a fight, Nolan kills the hooded operative while Zhang dies after a cyanide capsule concealed in one of his teeth breaks as a result of him getting pistol whipped by Hana. After discovering that one of the flight crew smuggled a suitcase with fake passports and cash implicating Hana as a British intelligence operative, the two deduce that Zhang and his accomplice's plan was to crash the plane and frame Hana. Hana and Nolan force the captain and co-pilot to fly the plane back to London. Meanwhile, Jess is taken into protective custody by MI5. When the British Prime Minister removes Delaney as head of the operation and replaces her with Tennant, Delaney escapes with Jess. Their plan is to meet Hana's plane at the airport. Delaney contacts Mike Maxwell for help, unaware that he is Eric Jones' superior.
6	"Episode 6"	Kieron Hawkes	Peter A Dowling	26 May 2024	6.87
In a flashback scene, CIA operatives led by Mike Maxwell monitor Nolan and Shen Zhào at the night club as part of an American operation to sabotage the Anglo-Chinese nuclear deal. After failing to stop Zhào from injecting the nano SIM card into Nolan, Maxwell and Eric Jones murder her and plant her body in Nolan's car. Hana and Nolan's plane lands at a British military airbase in London but they escape Tennant and MI6 with the help of Delaney and Jess. Meanwhile, British intelligence identifies Zhang and the other operative as freelancers working for a CIA shell company. At the US Embassy, Nolan recognizes that one of the Embassy staff was a staff member at the conference. Suspecting that the CIA have drugged their drinks, Nolan, Hana, Jess, and Delaney overpower their CIA captors. Maxwell attempts to stop them from leaving the Embassy but Jess hands him a crumbled up British Vodafone nano SIM, which he thinks is the Chinese SIM. After escaping the Embassy, the four send the file to Tennant, exposing a CIA cyber-operation to remotely cause a meltdown in one of the Anglo-Chinese nuclear power plants in order to damage Sino-British relations (by framing China as being able to cause the meltdown). Maxwell tracks Hana, Nolan and Delaney down to the grounds of the Chinese Embassy. Maxwell shoots Nolan but is arrested by Chinese soldiers and handed over to Minister Tang to face justice for Zhào's murder. While recovering in hospital, Nolan asks Hana out on a date. To avoid damaging United Kingdom-United States relations by exposing the CIA plot and starting a U.S.-China war, Delaney allows Jess to break a story about MI6 using doctors as unwitting couriers for intelligence operations. During a family gathering, Hana provides her father with files on her mother supplied by the British government.

=== Series 2 (2026) ===
Series 2 expands the scope of the narrative, following Hana, now a Detective Sergeant, as she becomes involved in an investigation centred on the United States Embassy in London. After the murder of a diplomatic courier, Hana and her colleague RSO Clay Brody (Martin Compston) pursue a suspect while uncovering links to an international conspiracy. As the investigation escalates, the embassy is placed into lockdown and further deaths reveal connections to a controversial inquiry into a past aviation disaster.

Running parallel to the embassy investigation, Delaney finds herself at the centre of a life-threatening situation when a bomb is discovered on the aircraft she is travelling on. Delaney works alongside Defence Secretary Alex Peterson (played by Nicholas Rowe) and the crew to prevent disaster, while journalists and investigators on the ground, including Jess, uncover evidence that gradually exposes the true scale of the conspiracy.

The six-part series concludes with the perpetrators being unmasked and those responsible brought to justice, as Hana and Brody confront personal challenges and collaborate with Delaney to resolve the case.

The series premiered on ITV1 on 1 January 2026, while the entire series was made available for streaming on ITVX from the same date. Episodes were subsequently broadcast over a week on ITV1.

No.	Title	Directed by	Written by	Original release date	UK viewers (millions)
1	"Episode 1"	Kieron Hawkes	Peter A Dowling	1 January 2026	3.88
A Samson D300 RAF-USAF joint prototype transport goes down over the Atlantic. A Russian attack is blamed, although the Kremlin denies involvement. 18 months later, the US and UK governments expel 64 Russian diplomats accused of being spies. The US Embassy in London prepares a party to receive Ronald Tillman, the new ambassador, with DSS RSO Clay Brody overseeing security. Delaney and UK Defence Secretary Peterson fly back from Arlington, having secured D300 construction in the UK. American diplomatic courier David Mills is killed after arriving in London, and his bag and credentials are stolen. Li is assigned to the case, reluctantly working alongside Brody. Fox, an assassin who resembles Mills, uses his badge to enter the embassy. After killing DSS agent Pete McQueen, he calls Thames House from Tillman’s office, threatening to detonate a bomb on Delaney and Peterson’s plane (which will also automatically detonate if it drops below 20,000 feet as it is linked to the planes altimeter) unless they stay on course. Brody, Li and several DSS agents breach the office, but Fox appears to have vanished.
2	"Episode 2"	Kieron Hawkes	Peter A Dowling	2 January 2026	TBA
Fox is revealed to have escaped via a secret exit in Tillman's office after placing a spy camera, and tells Deputy chief of mission Cece Redding he will blow up the plane if the embassy is evacuated. After speaking with Delaney and Peterson, Tillman orders a lockdown. Delaney asks Li to be her eyes and ears inside. Fox changes his appearance again to hide amongst the embassy party guests, and disables the CCTV. One guest, retired RAF Air Marshal John Johnson, mentions to Fox his son was killed on the prototype D300, and that at the time Tillman was CEO of the company that made it. Li and Brody fail to arrest Fox, and he plants a further spy camera on her jacket. Delaney and Peterson find the bomb hidden in a laptop, and are talked through dismantling it by a British Army EOD expert, via video call. Craig Stewart, a guest and former chief safety officer at Tillman's company A.M. Aeronautics, is killed by Fox.
3	"Episode 3"	Kieron Hawkes	Jingan Young and Peter A Dowling	4 January 2026	TBA
Tennant assumes command of Thames House again in Delaney's absence. Fox uses the camera in Tillman's office to capture his safe code. Fox kills another guest, Perry Lambert, who specialises in flight recorders. Johnson tells Noel King, an engine manufacturer, that he doesn't believe the Russians were behind the D300 crash that killed his son. Delaney fails to disarm the bomb, and accepts unless the detonator is found her plane will be shot down before entering British airspace. Moscow continues to deny involvement. MI5 links King, Tillman and Lambert to the D300 contract and further questions of Russia's culpability are raised. They also discover that an RAF engineer, Nick Martin, filed a complaint about the D300's integrity, but it has been wiped from the system and he allegedly committed suicide, although no body was recovered. Li confronts Fox and the two fight, but he overpowers her and escapes, sparing her life.
4	"Episode 4"	Camilla Strøm Henriksen	Peter A Dowling	5 January 2026	TBA
Li questions why Fox spared her life, and after she notices Brody has the same SAS tattoo as Fox, MI5 deduces he is not Russian. Fox is later presumed to be Charles Johnson, Air Marshal Johnson's son and brother of the pilot who died in the D300 crash. No photos exist of him due to his SAS work. Johnson claims to have been estranged from Charles since he was 18, and denies knowledge of money paid to him by the Russian BRC Bank. Brody deletes evidence he also received payment from the same bank. Li finds the micro camera on her jacket. Delaney's deputy Ruth Banks and Li's sister Jess reluctantly work together and discover Martin met with an unknown man shortly before disappearing. While taking a hard drive of CCTV footage back to Thames House, they are attacked by RMP officers, and Banks is shot. Delaney and Peterson's pilot plan to trick the altimeter and descend to below 20,000 feet and land without the bomb detonating.
5	"Episode 5"	Camilla Strøm Henriksen	Peter A Dowling	11 January 2026	4.15
The altimeter trick works, with the Prime Minister calling off the shoot-down order and Delaney's plane lands. Fox lets everyone leave except for Peterson, who helped deflect blame to Russia about the D300 failings at a US Congress closed session. Jess takes an injured Banks to Matt Nolan's house, where he stabilises her. She sends the footage to MI5, who identify the other man as Patrick Johnson, the D300 pilot. Li tells Brody about the spycam, and they try to use it to trick Fox out of hiding, using King as bait. However, Fox instead kidnaps Air Marshal Johnson and takes a briefcase from Tillman's safe. Brody reveals he is Charles Johnson (born Charles Clay Brody-Johnson), and he and his father are being framed. Redding has him arrested by the Marine Security Guard. Fox uses the emergency passage to enter the Ambassador's locked-down office, forces Tillman to lift the lockdown and makes Johnson shoot him. Fox then texts Peterson, revealed to be behind the conspiracy, saying that Tillman is dead and the briefcase is secured.
6	"Episode 6"	Camilla Strøm Henriksen	Peter A Dowling	12 January 2026	4.32
Brody breaches custody, rescues Johnson and injures Fox, while Li recovers the detonator. Fox narrowly escapes the embassy without the briefcase, which Li and Brody discover contains the missing black box from the D300. They play the recording at Thames House, which shows Patrick Johnson was transporting Martin, who had evidence Peterson had been embezzling millions from the D300 project, to the US to expose him. Peterson ordered the co-pilot to take over, and in an armed scuffle, Johnson was shot and the FCS was damaged, causing the crash. Two days earlier, Tillman is shown using his knowledge of the crash and embezzlement to blackmail Peterson to further his own political ambitions. In response, Peterson plans the assassinations to cover his tracks, hires Fox and has a diplomatic bag containing Fox's equipment sent from a vacant Congressional office while he is visiting Washington, D.C. Li, Brody and MI5 are able to trick him into admitting his guilt on tape, and Fox is arrested after a fight where Li spares his life. Brody comes close to killing Peterson to avenge his brother, but allows him to be arrested. Delaney offers Li a job with MI5, but she politely declines.

== Production ==
The six-part series was commissioned by ITVX in June 2023. It is from production company Bad Wolf and created and written by Peter A. Dowling, with episode 4 written by Jingan Young. The series is directed by Kieron Hawkes. The first series stars Jing Lusi, Richard Armitage, Lesley Sharp and Jemma Moore.

Filming on the aeroplane in the first series took place on a static aeroplane in a sound studio. Scenes were also filmed at Stansted Airport. All scenes were shot in and around London, including scenes set in Beijing.

A second series was announced in September 2024, with Lusi, Moore and Sharp returning, and Martin Compston, Jonathan Aris and Robert Gilbert joining the cast.

== Broadcast ==
The first series premiered on ITV1 and ITVX on 21 April 2024. In New Zealand, the series premiered on Warner Bros. Discovery New Zealand's streaming platform ThreeNow and its Three TV channel on 12 June 2024. The series was released on Hulu on 22 July 2025.

The second series premiered on ITV1 and ITVX on 1 January 2026. The whole series dropped on streaming service Stan in Australia on 2 January 2026.

== Reception ==
As of January 2026 the first series has a score of 57% on review aggregator Rotten Tomatoes, based on 14 reviews.

Lucy Mangan of The Guardian awarded the first episode three stars out of five, dubbing it "serviceable" and remarking, "If you watch the first episode you will very likely watch them all and they will slip down a treat. And then you will forget about it until the next time Armitage pops up". Nick Hilton in The Independent awarded it two out of five stars, finding it "derivative", and criticising Armitage's performance. Anita Singh in The Telegraph gave the series three out of five stars.

=== Accolades ===
It was nominated for New Drama at the 29th National Television Awards. The series won at the 2025 Broadcast Awards in the Best International Programme Sales category.
