= Lucianne McEvoy =

Irish actress

- Education: Trinity College Dublin
- Occupation: Actress
- Years active: 2004-
- Television: Shetland

Lucianne McEvoy is an Irish stage, television and film actress.

== Early life ==
From South Dublin, she began acting as a teenager in youth theatre projects in Bray at the Dry Rain Youth Theatre. She attended Dublin's Institute of Education and pursued acting at the Samuel Beckett Centre at Trinity College Dublin.

== Career ==
=== Stage career ===
In 2003, McEvoy played Antigone in Liz Lochhead's revised version of Theatre Babel's Thebans at the Assembly Rooms. In 2014, she appeared in The Libertine at the Citizens Theatre, Glasgow. The following year she starred at Òran Mór, Glasgow, in the Jean Racine 17th century play Andromaque adapted By Frances Poet. In 2016 at the Citizens Theatre she appeared in an adaptation of the 1900 August Strindberg play The Dance of Death, and in Conor McPherson play The Weir at the Royal Lyceum Theatre, Edinburgh.

In 2017, she appeared as Siobhan in the play adaptation of the Mark Haddon novel, The Curious Incident of The Dog in The Night-Time. In January 2018, she appeared in an adaptation of Rona Munro's Bold Girls at the Citizen's Theatre in Glasgow. Later that year, she played Ruth in David Ireland's satirical dark comedy Ulster American at the Traverse Theatre, Edinburgh. It won the Carol Tambor Best of Edinburgh Award for that year. In 2024, she had a main role in the comedy play So Young at the Edinburgh Fringe Festival.

=== Film & Television ===
She appeared as Tara in television series NY-LON. She had a recurring role as Meg Pattison in series six and seven of BBC One crime drama series Shetland. In 2023, she acted in the film The Problem with People alongside Paul Reiser and Colm Meaney. In 2024, she played Kate Ward in ITVX espionage thriller television series Red Eye.

== Personal life ==
She is married to the actor Peter Collins and has two daughters.

== Filmography ==
Year	Title	Role	Notes
2004	NY-LON	Tara	5 episodes
2013	The Making of Us	Helen	
2020	Group	Nell	1 episode
2020	Unprecedented	Heidi	1 episode
2021-2022	Shetland	Meg Pattison	11 episodes
2023	Dead Shot	Vet's wife	
2023	The Problem with People	Fiona	
2024	Red Eye	Dr Kate Ward	5 episodes
