= Slip (TV series) =

- Genre: Comedy
- Created by: Zoe Lister-Jones
- Starring: Zoe Lister-Jones; Charlene McNabb; Emily Hampshire; Whitmer Thomas; Tymika Tafari; Amar Chadha-Patel; Sofia Galasso
- Countries of origin: Canada; United States
- Original language: English
- No. of episodes: 7

Production
- Executive producers: Dakota Johnson; Ro Donnelly; Katie O'Connell; Ivan Schneeberg; David Fortier; Nick Nantell
- Production companies: TeaTime Pictures; Boat Rocker Media

Original release
- Network: The Roku Channel
- Release: April 21, 2023

Slip is a comedy television series created by Zoe Lister-Jones. It stars Lister-Jones as a woman who travels through parallel universes trying to find her way back to her partner and herself. It premiered on The Roku Channel on April 21, 2023, but was removed from the service that September as part of wider cost-cutting measures. Following the removal, it was announced that Boat Rocker Studios was seeking a new U.S. home for the series. It has since been announced that the series will be available on Peacock as of April 20, 2026.

== Premise ==
Mae Cannon travels through parallel universes trying to find her way back to her partner and herself.

== Cast and characters ==
- Zoe Lister-Jones as Mae Cannon
- Emily Hampshire as Sandy
- Whitmer Thomas as Elijah
- Tymika Tafari as Gina
- Amar Chadha-Patel as Eric
- Sofia Galasso as Eva

== Episodes ==
No.	Title	Directed by	Written by	Original release date
1	"The Wife"	Zoe Lister-Jones	Zoe Lister-Jones	April 21, 2023
2	"The Lush"	Zoe Lister-Jones	Zoe Lister-Jones	April 21, 2023
3	"The Mother"	Zoe Lister-Jones	Zoe Lister-Jones	April 21, 2023
4	"The Imposter"	Zoe Lister-Jones	Zoe Lister-Jones	April 21, 2023
5	"The Widow"	Zoe Lister-Jones	Zoe Lister-Jones	April 21, 2023
6	"The Girlfriend"	Zoe Lister-Jones	Zoe Lister-Jones	April 21, 2023
7	"The Dakini"	Zoe Lister-Jones	Zoe Lister-Jones	April 21, 2023

== Production ==
=== Development ===
In March 2022, it was announced Zoe Lister-Jones would write and direct a comedy series for The Roku Channel, with Dakota Johnson set to executive produce under her TeaTime Pictures banner. In September 2023, The Roku Channel removed the series.

=== Casting ===
Upon the initial announcement, it was announced Zoe Lister-Jones would star in the series. In April 2022, Emily Hampshire, Charlene McNabb, Whitmer Thomas, Tymika Tafari and Amar Chadha-Patel had joined the cast of the series.

=== Filming ===
Principal photography began in April 2022 in Toronto.

== Reception ==
Review aggregator Rotten Tomatoes reports that 100% of 13 reviews are positive, with an average rating of 7.8/10. The website's critics consensus reads, "A superb showcase for Zoe Lister Jones, Slip doesn't trip on its metaphysical concept and delivers an entertaining rumination on the road not taken." Slip was nominated twice for the 39th Independent Spirit Awards for Best New Scripted Series and Zoe Lister-Jones, Best Lead Performance in a New Scripted Series.
