= Jingan Young =

Hong Kong playwright

Jingan MacPherson Young
- Born: 1990 (age 35–36) Hong Kong
- Occupation: Dramatist

Jingan Young
- Traditional Chinese: 楊靜安
- Simplified Chinese: 杨静安
Transcriptions
Standard Mandarin
- Hanyu Pinyin: Yáng Jìng'ān
Yue: Cantonese
- Jyutping: Joeng^{4} Zing^{6}-on^{1}

Dr Jingan MacPherson Young/Yang/Yeung (Chinese: 楊靜安) is a Hong Kong born award-winning playwright, screenwriter, film scholar and journalist. She is best known for writing for the ITV hit series Red Eye.

She is the daughter of John Dragon Young (1949–1996), a scholar of Chinese history and politician in Hong Kong.

She lives in the UK with her husband and two children.

She is represented by the Curtis Brown agency.

== Education ==
Jingan was educated at King's College London, earning a BA (Hons) in English and Film Studies, and at Kellogg College, Oxford, earning a Master of Studies in Creative Writing. She also holds a Foundation in Art from Parsons School of Design. In 2020, she completed a PhD in Film Studies at King's College London.

== Career ==
Young's book Soho on Screen, the first study of London's Soho in film, was published by Berghahn Books in May 2022 with a foreword by Peter Bradshaw.

She is the editor of the groundbreaking Foreign Goods: A Selection of Writing by British East Asian Artists, the first collection of British East Asian plays published in the United Kingdom by Bloomsbury Books.

She was previously a Lecturer in Screenwriting at Birkbeck, University of London.

Young is a regular contributor to the Guardian on film, where she writes on a variety of topics including East Asian representation, China and Hollywood, such as Pixar's Turning Red.

She wrote episode 4 and was a story consultant on the ITVX and Bad Wolf thriller Red Eye starring Jing Lusi and Richard Armitage. She returned to write on Series 2.

In 2025, Young was one of the co-writers on Counsels a BBC legal drama set in Glasgow; she contributed to the original writers’ room and wrote an episode.
