= Lot No. 249 (film) =

2023 British television ghost story

- Based on: "Lot No. 249" by Arthur Conan Doyle
- Written by: Mark Gatiss
- Directed by: Mark Gatiss
- Starring: Kit Harington as Abercrombie Smith; Freddie Fox as Edward Bellingham; Colin Ryan as Monkhouse Lee; John Heffernan as The Friend; James Swanton as The Mummy; Jonathan Rigby as Styles; Andrew Horton as Long Norton

Production
- Producer: Isibeal Ballance
- Running time: 30 minutes

Original release
- Release: 24 December 2023

Related
- A Ghost Story for Christmas

Lot No. 249 is a short film which is part of the British supernatural anthology series A Ghost Story for Christmas. Produced by Isibeal Ballance and written and directed by Mark Gatiss, it is based on the gothic horror story of the same name by Arthur Conan Doyle, first published in Harper's Magazine in 1892, and first aired on BBC Two on 24 December 2023.

It stars Kit Harington as Abercrombie Smith, a student athlete at Oxford University who discovers that his neighbour, Edward Bellingham (Freddie Fox) is using a revived Egyptian mummy to murder his rivals.

The majority of instalments in the series have been based on ghost stories by M. R. James, with "The Signalman" (1976), based on a story by Charles Dickens, and three original episodes (Note: The original episodes are "Stigma" (1977), "The Ice House" (1978) and "The Dead Room" (2018).) being the only break with this tradition. Gatiss had expressed a desire to adapt other authors, and a season of programming related to Conan Doyle which the BBC aired over Christmas 2023 influenced the choice of "Lot No. 249".

== Plot ==
An Oxford student, Abercrombie Smith, recounts to his friend that his neighbour, Edward Bellingham, is using a revived Egyptian mummy to murder his social and romantic rivals. Following this meeting, Smith returns to his college, confronts Bellingham at gunpoint about his "perversions", and forces him to destroy the mummy and the associated artefacts. However, in the closing moments it is revealed that Bellingham has a second mummy – "Lot No. 250" – which he uses to continue his killing spree.

== Cast ==
- Kit Harington as Abercrombie Smith
- Freddie Fox as Edward Bellingham
- Colin Ryan as Monkhouse Lee
- John Heffernan as The Friend (Note: Who, it is implied, is Sherlock Holmes.)
- James Swanton as The Mummy
- Jonathan Rigby as Styles
- Andrew Horton as Long Norton

== Production ==
The film was produced by Adorable Media for BBC Arts, with Mark Gatiss continuing the tradition of adapting a classic ghost story for the BBC for transmission at Christmas. Kit Harington and Freddie Fox were announced as having the lead roles in October 2023. Later that month the cast list was expanded by Colin Ryan, John Heffernan, James Swanton, Jonathan Rigby and Andrew Horton. Filming took place in Hertfordshire in 2023.

== Broadcast ==
Its first broadcast was in the UK on BBC Two on 24 December 2023.

== Reception ==
Pat Stacey in The Irish Independent described it as succeeding "in raising the kind of chills the classic 70s episodes provoked."
