= John Dragon Young =

- Born: November 5, 1949; Beijing
- Died: November 5, 1996 (aged 47); Hong Kong
- Known for: Historian

John Dragon Young (5 November 1949 – 5 November 1996) was a scholar of Chinese history and Hong Kong politician.

== Early life and education ==
Young was born in Beijing to an academic family whose members have included Yang Xianyi and Gladys Yang. After the Communists took over Beijing his family fled to Hong Kong where he received his primary and secondary education. He then went to the United States for his tertiary education, earning his B.A. at California State University at Hayward.

He earned his Ph.D. at University of California, Davis in 1976, his dissertation was later revised and published as 'Confucianism and Christianity: the First Encounter' (1983).

== Politics ==
Young successfully ran for a seat on the Sha Tin (New Territories) 新界沙田 District Council in 1988.

Later he stood as an independent in the 1991 elections for the Kowloon Central constituency of the Hong Kong LegCo but did not win a seat.

His youngest daughter is the playwright Jingan Young author of FILTH (Failed in London, Try Hong Kong) the first English language play produced by the Hong Kong Arts Festival.

== Published works ==
- Confucianism and Christianity: the Jesuits, their converts, and their critics, 1552-1669 (1976)
- "Sun Yat-sen and Hong Kong : the development of his early theories on China's modernization, 1887-1897", published in Perspectives on China's modernization : variations on a theme (1984)
- Towards a Hong Kong identity : the riots of 1966 and 1967 (1991)
