= Crossings (TV series) =

Malaysian Television Series

- Genre: Action; Drama; Supernatural
- Created by: Prakash Murugiah of Kash Picture
- Directed by: BMW Shorties, Prakash Murugiah
- Starring: Zakizamani Osman; Dira Abu Zahar; Hansen Lee
- Country of origin: Malaysia
- Original languages: English; Malay; Cantonese (minor); Tamil (minor)
- No. of episodes: 13

Production
- Executive producer: Prakash Murugiah
- Production location: Malaysia

Original release
- Network: ntv7
- Release: 1 October 2010

Crossings is a Malaysia dark comedy television drama that consisted of 13 episodes.

== Plot ==
Bob works as a copywriter in an advertising agency where he is constantly heckled by his demanding boss, Ms Merlin, gets bullied and made the butt of jokes by the receptionist and office queen, Anthony, and mercilessly used and played out by the manipulative office beauty, Brenda. The pudgy Bob is a pushover and doesn't have much going for him. In short, Bob is a loser. Until one day, Bob gets into a freak accident. He ends up being able to see dead souls in his reflections. Bob slowly learns to adapt to his ability and learns that he is a hero in his own way after all. He attempts to help the souls find peace. In helping the lost souls seek the closure they need to move on, Bob inadvertently helps the living they left behind to do the same.

Bob comes across a bumbling simple-minded man at first. However he has an underlying charm and lovability in his forgiving nature and eagerness to help others, making viewers root for this unlikely hero. He is later befriended by Katie, the tomboyish and street-smart filmmaker, who joins his company. In their first attempt to get rid of Bob's first ghost, the duo gets to know Danny, the boyish geek who invents contraptions he thinks can detect the supernatural. The unlikely trio ends up being good friends and goes on to have adventures of the supernatural kind. In their attempts to help out Bob's ghosts, they inadvertently get into numerous comic situations. An unknown hooded figure and cryptic notes make a recurring appearance every time Bob is on the job, adding to the mystery and suspense aspect of the series.

== Cast ==
- Zakizamani Osman as Bob Boroi, an advertising agency copywriter.
- Dira Abu Zahar as Katie, a filmmaker.
- Hansen Lee as Danny, the boyish inventor.
- Nina Sharil Khan as Mrs Merlin, the boss of the advertising agency.
- Xavier Fong as Anthony, the receptionist from the advertising agency.
- Ruzana Ibrahim as Brenda, a manipulative office beauty who works at the advertising agency.
- Craig Fong as Corporal Kanada, a Japanese soldier who has gone AWOL from the Japanese Army in WW2.
- Indi Nadarajah
- Colin Kirton
- Ako Mustapha
- Yvonne Sim
- Chew Kin Wah
- James Lim
- Alan Yun
- Julia Ziegler
- Mustapha Kamal
- Prem Shankar
