= Jonathan Rigby =

English actor and film historian

Jonathan Rigby is an English actor and film historian who has written several notable books. Video Watchdog magazine described him as occupying "a proud place in the advance guard of film researchers, writers and critics," and in 2020 he was inducted into the Rondo Hatton Classic Horror Awards Hall of Fame.

== Biography ==
As an actor, Rigby trained at the Central School of Speech and Drama from 1986 to 1989. Among his earliest roles on graduating was that of Mr Rochester in an adaptation of Jane Eyre at the Brunton Theatre, Musselburgh in 1991. His stage play, Bram Stoker's Dracula, was produced at London's Pentameters Theatre in 1997, marking the original novel's centenary, and subsequently went on tour.

Rigby then made a speciality of playing Kenneth Horne in a series of stage shows based on the 1960s radio comedy Round the Horne, beginning with Round the Horne ... Revisited, which transferred to The Venue in Leicester Square and ran from 2003 to 2005. The production was adapted for BBC Four and also featured in the 2004 Royal Variety Performance. In 2008-09 he was in a regional tour of Round the Horne - Unseen and Uncut and the BBC Radio 4 special Twice Ken is Plenty, then in 2017 he appeared in a new stage show called Horne A'Plenty.

As a director, Rigby revived Sylvia Rayman's 1951 play Women of Twilight at London's White Bear Theatre in 2013, the production transferring to Pleasance Islington the following year. He is also an Associate Research Fellow of the Cinema and Television History Research Centre at Leicester's De Montfort University and has contributed audio and video commentaries to numerous DVD and Blu-ray releases.

In 2010, Rigby was series consultant on the three-part BBC Four documentary A History of Horror, also making a brief appearance as Dracula in the opening episode. Two years later he was programme consultant on the feature-length follow-up, Horror Europa. Also on screen, he played psychic researcher Harry Price in the part-animated 2017 feature film Borley Rectory: The Most Haunted House in England and Thomas Styles in Lot No. 249, the 2023 entry in the BBC's A Ghost Story for Christmas series.

== Bibliography ==
- English Gothic: A Century of Horror Cinema. Reynolds & Hearn. 2000. ISBN 978-1903111017.

- English Gothic: Classic Horror Cinema 1897-2015. Signum Books. 2015. ISBN 978-0957648166. Expanded version of the original.

- Christopher Lee: The Authorised Screen History. Reynolds & Hearn. 2001. ISBN 978-1903111116.
- Roxy Music: Both Ends Burning. Reynolds & Hearn. 2005. ISBN 978-1903111802.
- American Gothic: Sixty Years of Horror Cinema. Reynolds & Hearn. 2007. ISBN 978-1905287253.

- American Gothic: Six Decades of Classic Horror Cinema. Signum Books. 2017. ISBN 978-0995519138. Expanded version of the original.

- Studies in Terror: Landmarks of Horror Cinema. Signum Books. 2011. ISBN 978-0956653444.
- Euro Gothic: Classics of Continental Horror Cinema. Signum Books. 2016. ISBN 978-0957648159.
