= London Fashion Film Festival =

Annual film festival in London, England

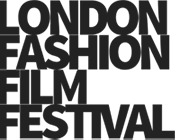
- Genre: Fashion Short Film, Fashion Documentary, Fashion Music Video
- Frequency: Annually
- Locations: London, England
- Inaugurated: 2014
- Website: lfff.co.uk

The London Fashion Film Festival is a London based annual event established by professionals from within the fashion and film industries to showcase creative talents in the genre of fashion film.

== History ==
The festival was inaugurated in 2013 by experts across the film and fashion industries, under the leadership of Beatrice Bloom, the Festival President and Director. The first award show was in 2014. Each year, filmmakers, designers, agencies and labels all over the world are allowed to submit entries of their work which would then be reviewed by the organisers before an official list is Nominated for the award proper. The award festival will involve screening of the Nominated fashion films, presentation of the awards, a question and answer session and an after party The festival has showcased works of brands like Swarovski, Revlon, Juicy Couture and Harper's Bazaar.

== Winners and Nominations ==
=== 2014 ===
The 2014 maiden edition had 40 screened films from 13 categories out of which winners were Nominated.

Best Fashion Documentary		Best Fashion Film	
Green Cut Directed by Lucy Siegle	Winner	Escandalo Directed by Dean Alexander	Winner
Dreamweavers Directed by Anthony Lau	Nominated	Akuma Directed by: Huba Barat	Nominated
Moving Portrait Henry Holland Directed by Clive Booth	Nominated	"La Ragione" Vogue Italia Directed by: Pietro Cocco	Nominated
London Cloth Directed by Florence Kennard	Nominated	The Romantics Directed by: Ryan Daniel Dobson	Nominated
Best Advertisement		Best Director	
Wisteria Hysteria Directed by Henry Pincus	Winner	The Romantics Directed by Ryan Daniel Dobson	Winner
Essential by: Bob Jeusette	Nominated	My Mind by Borja Mucientes	Nominated
House of Holland Lookbook Directed by Clive Booth	Nominated	Paroha: Surrender Directed by: Daisy Gili	Nominated
Ursula: New York Trap Surfing Directed by Lee Morgan	Nominated	Green Cut by Lucy Lucy Siegle	Nominated
Best Idea or Story		Best Cinematography	
Ursula: New York Trap Surfing Directed by: Lee Morgan	Winner	Escandalo Directed by Dean Alexander	Winner
"La Ragione" Vogue Italia Directed by: Pietro Cocco	Nominated	Madeleine Road Directed by Alexandre Allain & Benoit Bargeton	Nominated
Matou Directed by: Isamu Hirabayashi	Nominated	Escandalo Directed by Dean Alexander	Nominated
Maiyet SS14: Jen Campbell	Nominated	My Mind by Borja Mucientes	Nominated
Best Actor/Model		Best Visual Effects	
Alive Directed by: Samuel A. Martin	Winner	Matin Lunaire Directed by: Clément Oberto	Winner
Lost in Paris Directed by: Lynn Pulsifer	Nominated	Tribe Directed by: Jan Macierewicz	Nominated
Alba Knitwear Directed by: Martin Rivero & Matias	Nominated	Moving Portrait Henry Holland Directed by: Clive Booth	Nominated
Her Forgotten Act Directed by: Jaime Schirmer	Nominated	Neoteric Directed by: Chris Butler	Nominated
Best Music		Best Editing	
Choreograffiti Directed by Sarah Böckenhüser & Andreas Schimmelpfennig	Winner	House of Holland Lookbook Directed by: Clive Booth	Winner
Lost in Paris Directed by Lynn Pulsifer	Nominated	Kubatek Directed by: Szymon Pawlik	Nominated
Tribe Directed by Jan Macierewicz	Nominated	A Surrealist Account Of: After Dark Directed by: Eduardo Alcivar	Nominated
Kubatek Directed by Szymon Pawlik	Nominated	Madeleine Road Directed by: Alexandre Allain & Benoit Bargeton	Nominated
Best Costume Design		Best Accessory Design	
Her Forgotten Act Directed by Jaime Schirmer	Winner	Paroha: Surrender Directed by Daisy Gili	Winner
Matou Directed by: Isamu Hirabayashi	Nominated	Institutionalised Directed by: Roy Schwelger	Nominated
Paroha: Surrender Directed by Daisy Gili	Nominated	Punk Love Directed by: Marcos Mello	Nominated
Madeleine Road Directed by: Alexandre Allain & Benoit Bargeton	Nominated	Bodymod Directed by:Hinny Tran	Nominated
Best Make-up and Hairstyle			
Alive Directed by: Samuel A.Martin	Winner		
Her Forgotten Act Directed by Jaime Schirmer	Nominated		
The Romantics Directed by Ryan Daniel Dobson	Nominated		
Bodymod Directed by Hinny Tran	Nominated		

=== 2015 ===
The 2nd edition of the festival was held on 15 September 2015 at Mondrian Hotel, London. 35 short films and documentaries were screened from 13 categories.

Best Fashion Documentary		Best Fashion Film	
Behind the Prize, directed by Anthony Lau	Winner	The Legend of Lady White Snake, directed by Indrani Pal-Chaudhuri	Winner
Peyote Dreams, directed by Luis Barreto Carrillo & Amber Moelter	Nominated	Ignited, directed by Damien Krisl, Lucian Bor	Nominated
LE FIX SS 15 directed by Lasse Martinussen	Nominated	La Carolas, directed by Josep Llordés	Nominated
Best Advertisement		Beckmans x Cheap Monday, directed by Simon Jung Krestesen & Jens Löfgren	Nominated
X, directed by Rankin, Vicky Lawton, David Allain, Bronwen Parker-Rhodes, Trisha Ward, Damien Fry, JoHunt	Winner	Best Director	
Asgar Juan Larsen-Woolmark, directed by Martin Strandgaard & Viktor Sloth	Nominated	The Legend of Lady White Snake, directed by Indrani Pal-Chaudhuri	Winner
Amen, directed by Manuel Portillo	Nominated	Tim Labenda SS15 – LANDSCAPES, directed by Damien Vignaux	Nominated
Couture Oasis, directed by Tarik Malak & Timothy Douglas	Nominated	Power of One, directed by Gracie Otto	Nominated
Best Story		X, directed by Rankin, Vicky Lawton, David Allain, Bronwen Parker- Rhodes, Trisha Ward, Damien Fry, Jo Hunt	Nominated
Cream Caramel, directed by CANADA	Winner	Best Cinematography	
La Carolas, directed by Josep Llordés	Nominated	A Brave New Love, directed by Amer Chadha-Patel	Winner
Amor De Madre, directed by Marçal Forés	Nominated	Crushing Weight, directed by Vinícius Cardoso	Nominated
Into the Glitch, directed by Tarik Malak & Timothy Douglas	Nominated	Crème Caramel, directed by CANADA	Nominated
Best Actor/Model		Dark Seduction, directed by Paula Ortiz	Nominated
Crushing Weight, directed by Vinícius Cardoso	Winner	G., directed by Esther Löwe	Nominated
The Legend of Lady White Snake, directed by Indrani Pal-Chaudhuri	Nominated	Best Visual Effects	
Mannequin, directed by Mehdi Nowroozi	Nominated	Tim Labenda SS15 – LANDSCAPES, directed by Damien Vignaux	Winner
La Carolas, directed by Josep Llordés	Nominated	X, directed by Rankin, Vicky Lawton, David Allain, Bronwen Parker- Rhodes, Trisha Ward, Damien Fry, Jo Hunt	Nominated
Best Music		Ignited, directed by Damien Krisl, Lucian Bor	Nominated
Dark Seduction, directed by Paula Ortiz	Winner	Best Editing	
RDC-Really Don't Care, directed by Priscilla Santinelli	Nominated	X, directed by Rankin, Vicky Lawton, David Allain, Bronwen Parker-Rhodes, Trisha Ward, Damien Fry, Jo Hunt	Winner
Beckmans x Cheap Monday, directed by Simon Jung Krestesen & Jens Löfgren	Nominated	A Brave New Love, directed by Amer Chadha-Patel	Nominated
The Interloper, directed by Tarik Malak & Timothy Douglas	Nominated	The Legend of Lady White Snake, directed by Indrani Pal-Chaudhuri	Nominated
Best Costume design		Black Scraptrolly, directed by Anna-Nicole Ziesche	Nominated
Silver Girl, directed by Josh Brandao and Nicolai Kornum	Winner	Best Accessory Design	
SoPopular, directed by Tatjana Meirelles	Nominated	The Legend of Lady White Snake, directed by Indrani Pal-Chaudhuri	Winner
Tough as leather, directed by Elisha Smith-Leverock	Nominated	Siren Song, directed by Lisandro Suriel	Nominated
Mannequin, directed by Mehdi Nowroozi	Nominated	Silver girl, directed byJosh Brandao and Nicolai Kornum	Nominated
Best Make Up and Hairstyle		Couture Oasis, directed by Tarik Malak & Timothy Douglas	Nominated
The Interloper, directed by Tarik Malak & Timothy Douglas	Winner	Best Major Brand Production	
The Legend of Lady White Snake, directed by Indrani Pal-Chaudhuri	Nominated	A Brave New Love, directed by Amer Chadha-Patel	Winner
Chilli Bean "Punk-Glam Swarovski", directed by Luigi Dias	Nominated	Garage Magazine, directed by Yvan Fabing	Nominated
Dream Travel in the Pastel Sky, directed by Malorie Shmyr	Nominated	Couture Oasis, directed by Tarik Malak & Timothy Douglas	Nominated
		X, directed by Rankin, Vicky Lawton, David Allain, Bronwen Parker- Rhodes, Trisha Ward, Damien Fry, Jo Hunt	Nominated

=== 2016 ===
The 2016 edition of the festival took place on 14 September 2016. There were 14 categories of awards.

Best Fashion Documentary		Best Fashion Film	
Alex James: Slowing Down Fast Fashion, directed by Ben Akers	Winner	The Revolution by Nico Kreis	Winner
Revealing Marie Saint Pierre	Nominated	The Neeta Lulla Bride	Nominated
Bangaologia	Nominated	Podrugadruga	Nominated
		MYTH	Nominated
Best Advertisement		Best Director	
These four walls, directed by Rankin	Winner	Till Human Voices Wake Us directed by Indrani Pal-Chaudhuri	Winner
Surreal		Embrace Life	Nominated
Primavera		Alex James: Slowing Down Fast Fashion	Nominated
Ascent		NUBIVAGANT	Nominated
Beautifully Delinquent		Best Cinematography	
Beautifully Delinquent		This is your time, directed by Nick Tree	Winner
Best Story		Sickly Sweet Suburbia	Nominated
Susanna, directed by Michel Jaumin	Winner	Breaking rules	Nominated
Richest Black	Nominated	Breaking rules	Nominated
This is your time	Nominated		
Love lab	Nominated	Best Visual Effects and Special Effects	
Best Actor/ Model		Efímera directed by Paco Peregrín	Winner
The Good Italian II "The Prince goes to Milan" directed by Emanuele Di Bacco	Winner	NUBIVAGANT	Nominated
Ruby Flip	Nominated	Best Music	
In and out of control	Nominated	Coco Morocco by Nil Hoppenot	Winner
Pink Purse	Nominated	ICELAND, Imperial FW 2015	Nominated
Till Human Voices Wake Us	Nominated	Surreal	Nominated
Best Editing		Valentino SS16	Nominated
This is your time, directed by Nick Tree	Winner		
Richest Black	Nominated	MYTH, directed by MANFRE & IKER ITURRIA	Winner
Point of View	Nominated	Richest Black	Nominated
Sophie : A Story Of Discovery	Nominated	Susanna	Nominated
Best Costume Design		How to make the perfect tea party (for dolls)	Nominated
The Neeta Lulla Bride, directed by Sunny Bhambhani	Winner	Best Make up and Hairstyle	
Toy	Nominated	Muk Bang, directed by Tarik Malak & Timothy Douglas (Tn’T)	Winner
How to make the perfect tea party (for dolls)	Nominated	Richest Black	Nominated
MYTH	Nominated	"Fairy Fight"	Nominated
The12project	Nominated	Till Human Voices Wake Us	Nominated
Best Student Fashion Film		Best Major Brand Production	
Sickly Sweet Suburbia, directed by Anna Ling	Winner	Marc Cain Bags & Shoes, directed by Sandra Jakisch	Winner
Coco Morocco	Nominated	VALENTINO SS16	Nominated
Love Lab	Nominated	The Good Italian II "The Prince goes to Milan"	Nominated
The Revelation	Nominated	Efímera	Nominated

=== 2017 ===
The fourth edition of the awards took place on 14 September 2017 and with attendees from United States, Canada, Spain and Italy. During the event, 60 individual films were shown to an audience of filmmakers and fashion professionals.

Best Fashion Documentary		Best Fashion Film	
Art of Style: Pierpaolo Piccioli By Lisa Immordino Vreeland	Winner	Strellson "Make Yourself Unstoppable" by Kai Voepel, Joffrey Jans (Wolf&Lamm)	Winner
Model Material	Nominated	The Milliner	Nominated
Ethetics Episode 2 by Mdingi Coutts	Nominated	Casamorati	Nominated
In Conversation With Vogue Arabia	Nominated	Locked	Nominated
Best Advertisement		Best Director	
Iron man by Manuel Portillo	Winner	ARMONIA by Luca La Vopa	Winner
HACKETT x ASTON MARTIN	Nominated	Other People's Heads	Nominated
I'm my fairy tale	Nominated	The Wild Gentlemen	Nominated
Think Outside the Box	Nominated	Guide for the Good Wife	Nominated
Think Outside the Box	Nominated	Best Cinematography	
Best Story		Locked by Konrad Bak	Winner
Rebel In Rising by Braden Summers	Winner	The 3rd Woman	Nominated
Gymnast	Nominated	XIU LONG	Nominated
ASMR	Nominated	We are all Labour	Nominated
The Course of War	Nominated	Best Visual Effects and Special Effects	
Best Actor/ Model		PERCOLOMETRIA by Matteo Di Gioia & Luis Felipe Bueno	Winner
The Milliner by Meagan Cignoli	Winner	Reawaken	Nominated
Four Stories: ALL DAY EVERY DAY	Nominated	Best Music	
The Fashion Film	Nominated	Think Outside the Box by Doug Clayton	Winner
Herod's Daughter	Nominated	Montreuil Story	Nominated
Herod's Daughter	Nominated	Rose Gold	Nominated
Best Editing		Whatever Your Style	Nominated
20 years of sun by Carlos Mach	Winner	Best Accessory Design	
RITZ PARIS	Nominated	A Fashion Fairy tale by Henrik Steen	Winner
Bleu Reine	Nominated	Georgetown Optician: "The Eye Ball"	Nominated
Ricercato (Wanted)	Nominated	Scappino Adv 2016	Nominated
Best Costume Design		Young Rumi	Nominated
Fifth Samurai by Stas Gurenko	Winner	Best Make up and Hairstyle	
XIU LONG	Nominated	A Fashion Fairy tale by Henrik Steen	Winner
Casamorati	Nominated	Rose gold	Nominated
Yoshikimono	Nominated	REBEL IN RISING	Nominated
Yoshikimono	Nominated	Locked	Nominated
Best Major Brand Production		Best 2D & 3D Animation	
The Eye Ball by Dean Alexander	Winner	The Innovator by Lucas Brooking	Winner
The Good Italian III – The magic of Naples	Nominated	Percolometria	Nominated
Strellson "make yourself unstoppable"	Nominated	After light and dark	Nominated
The milliner	Nominated		
Best Student Fashion Film
Guide for the Good Wife by Ignacio Sepulveda	Winner		
LUI/LEI	Nominated		
This Is Chaos	Nominated		
Resurrection	Nominated		

=== 2018 ===
The festival's fifth edition took place on 14 September 2018, drawing attendees from all over the world. It featured about 70 individual films which were shown to the audience during the event.

Best Fashion Documentary		Best Fashion Film	
Ovation for OSCAR by Ryan Curtis, SCAD Alumnus	Winner	The Perfect Parisienne by Victor Claramunt	Winner
The Beautiful People – Episode One (September)	Nominated	City Blossom	Nominated
The Beauty of Reverso	Nominated	Start the Buzz	Nominated
I am Thinking of Pierre Cardin	Nominated	A Postcard From Sorrento	Nominated
Best Advertisement		Best Director	
Timeless by Seb Edwards	Winner	Not(e) for a Dreamer by Enrico Poli	Winner
Santos – Cartier	Nominated	MARTAN	Nominated
I'm with the Brand	Nominated	Patta x Dekmantel – What a world	Nominated
Reebok x Zalando – Wake Up	Nominated	Kukukid School	Nominated
Reebok x Zalando – Wake Up	Nominated	Best Cinematography	
Best Story		Timeless by Seb Edwards	Winner
Perfect In Her Own Right by Christina MacGillivray	Winner	The Kneed	Nominated
I AM AN INDIVIDUAL	Nominated	Fellow Dreamers	Nominated
Tomboy	Nominated	ARMOUR	Nominated
Victorian rebels	Nominated	Best Visual Effects and Special Effects	
Best Actor/ Model		Macrocosmos by Adrien Servadio	Winner
Santos - Cartier by Seb Edwards	Winner	Seduction	Nominated
Nordic Winter	Nominated	The Gift from Nature	Nominated
My Music	Nominated	Ideas that exchange	Nominated
A Postcard From Sorrento	Nominated	Best Music	
A Postcard From Sorrento	Nominated	Essence of life by Christopher Stark	Winner
A Postcard From Sorrento	Nominated	Inseparable	Nominated
A Postcard From Sorrento	Nominated	Stieglitz - Morocco	Nominated
Best Editing		I'll Be Your Mirror	Nominated
City Blossom by Victor Claramunt	Winner	Best Accessory Design	
Essence of life	Nominated	The Beauty of Reverso by Michael Brent Adam	Winner
MARTAN	Nominated	Lilith	Nominated
RSEA	Nominated	Inseparable	Nominated
Best Costume Design		Emporior Armani Watch in every life	Nominated
Mondrian Doha by Justin Kramer	Winner	Best Make up and Hairstyle	
The Faded Age	Nominated	Mondrian Doha by Justin Kramer	Winner
Anamnesis	Nominated	Narcissus	Nominated
imitation	Nominated	Fellow Dreamers	Nominated
imitation	Nominated	Start the Buzz	Nominated
Best Student Fashion Film		Best Major Brand Production	
Tomboy by Roman Reyes	Winner	Timeless by Seb Edwards	Winner
Essence of life	Nominated	Zortrax Fashion	Nominated
Beyond	Nominated	London Mashup	Nominated
Victorian rebels	Nominated	MIRROR ME	Nominated
Best 2D & 3D Animation
The Night Before Christmas by Chris Skinner	Winner		
Karl Lagerfeld for Jaspal	Nominated		
Imminent	Nominated		
The Gift from Nature	Nominated		

=== 2019 ===
The festival's sixth edition took place on the 13th of September 2019. A new category: Best Artistic Director was added to the awards.

Best Fashion Documentary		Best Fashion Film	
Made in Mexico	Winner	MARGAUX Vol.1	Winner
Secret Times	Nominated	JIJNASA - discovering Mumbai	Nominated
Safari Ya-sheti (The journey of a T-shirt )	Nominated	SCREEN TEST L.A.	Nominated
Safari Ya-sheti (The journey of a T-shirt )	Nominated	The Red Dancer	
Safari Ya-sheti (The journey of a T-shirt )	Nominated	Hong Kong Ballet: "Never Stang Still"	
Best Advertisement		Best Director	
SCREEN TEST L.A.	Winner	Abre Asas	Winner
labellamafia	Nominated	Autour du Bal	Nominated
Salt	Nominated	The Makeover	Nominated
Nightlife	Nominated	The Midnight Trip	Nominated
Soak	Nominated	Best Cinematography	
Best Story		Connect	Winner
Lost love	Winner	La Mer	Nominated
Human library	Nominated	EVOLUTION OF MAN	Nominated
Crucified	Nominated	Deepest Secret	Nominated
C41 Magazine x Adidas original	Nominated	Beautiful Hands	
C41 Magazine x Adidas original	Nominated	Best Visual Effects and Special Effects	
Best Actor/ Model		Face your mask	Winner
Digital content by Reese Witherspoon	Winner	Nylon Farm	Nominated
The midnight trip	Nominated	Moncler Fragment Hiroshi Fujiwara	Nominated
The Red Dancer	Nominated	Initiation	Nominated
It's not me	Nominated	Best Music	
It's not me	Nominated	Film me	Winner
It's not me	Nominated	Face your mask	Nominated
It's not me	Nominated	Salt	Nominated
Best Editing		Rebook always classic	Nominated
Galamb Tailoring No.2.	Winner	Best Accessory Design	
One Another	Nominated	Guo Pei: Couture Beyond	Winner
No Boundaries	Nominated	JIJNASA - discovering Mumbai	Nominated
Red Obsession	Nominated	The Flourish	Nominated
Best Costume Design		Fashion Ghost	Nominated
Guo Pei: Couture Beyond	Winner	Best Make up and Hairstyle	
EVOLUTION OF MAN	Nominated	The Flourish	Winner
Deepest Secret	Nominated	The Makeover	Nominated
Une Journee Chez Mamie	Nominated	Idiosyncrasy	Nominated
Une Journee Chez Mamie	Nominated	Looking for stars	Nominated
Best Student Fashion Film		Best Major Brand Production	
Patron Saint	Winner	No Boundaries	Winner
Stella McCartney x Breast Cancer Awareness	Nominated	FASHION FILM VOLUME 4	Nominated
Osariya - . A garment of many colours and textures	Nominated	Everything Looks Better in Eyewear	Nominated
Osariya - . A garment of many colours and textures	Nominated	Abre Asas	Nominated
Osariya - . A garment of many colours and textures	Nominated	Beautiful hands	Nominated
Best 2D & 3D Animation		Best Artistic Director	
Moncler Fragment Hiroshi Fujiwara	Winner	Face your mask	Winner
Kenzo La Collection Memento Nº3	Nominated	Alpha	Nominated
Offset	Nominated	Hong Kong Ballet: "Never Stang Still"	Nominated
Remember Pinocchio	Nominated	Death Head Sphinx	Nominated

=== 2020 ===
In the year 2020, due to the global pandemic caused by the novel COVID-19 virus, and the subsequent lockdown/restriction of movements in the UK, the festival's seventh edition was held virtually between the 12 and 13 September 2020 via the company's website. That year also saw the addition of new categories of awards: Best Emerging Talent, Best Children Fashion Film and Best Hairstyle. Also, The Best Actor/Model category was split into three: Best Actress (Model), Best Actor (Model), and Best Child Actor (Model) respectfully

Best Fashion Documentary			Best Fashion Film		
Vogue: sixty years through the lens	Winner		Driven - WolkMorais	Winner	
Comfort Zone	Nominated		Inhuman Love	Nominated	
I am your hair dresser	Nominated		Musical Chairs : a battle Royale	Nominated	
Nike L’incredible	Nominated		Stoners/ slices of infinity	Nominated	
Paris Mon Amour	Nominated		Stoners/ slices of infinity	Nominated	
Best Advertisement			Best Director		
NIKE | L’incredibile	Winner		The Trophy	Winner	
Georgetown Optician "Eyes Say More Than Words"	Nominated		NIKE | L’incredibile	Nominated	
NARS – Impermanence	Nominated		be ANOTHER" LEDIN Fashion Campaign 2019	Nominated	
The Dreamer	Nominated		Georgetown Optician "Eyes Say More Than Words"	Nominated	
Black xs Los Angeles - Paco Rabanne	Nominated		Best Cinematography		
Best Story			Out Of Comfort - The Heist	Winner	
Butterfly	Winner		Black xs Los Angeles - Paco Rabanne	Nominated	
Season Of Aeon	Nominated		L.A.F.S	Nominated	
I'll say it first	Nominated		NOTHING IS QUITE AS IT MAY SEEM	Nominated	
Just for a second- An Isolate Tale	Nominated		Plateau N.1		
Just for a second- An Isolate Tale	Nominated		Best Actress/Model		
Best Actor/Model			RHYME SO for Fashion Blogger	Winner	
KyryloKabachenkofor Georgetown Optician "Eyes Say More Than Words"	Winner		Tang for "be ANOTHER" LEDIN Fashion Campaign 2019	Nominated	
Pablo Cobo for Alma	Nominated		Silvia Bonavigo for Alex	Nominated	
Micah Fitzgerald for Butterfly	Nominated		Jade Lorna Sullivan for Butterfly	Nominated	
Best Child Actor/Model				Best Children Fashion Film	
Clara Remero for Sinestia	Winner			Temple Of Eternity	Winner
Henleigh Lawrence for Euphoria	Nominated			Sinestesia	Nominated
Amelie Therese Magin for Temple of Eternity	Nominated			Euphoria	Nominated
Rosa Kronsteiner for NEW RELIGION- another perspective	Nominated			NEW RELIGION- another perspective	Nominated
Rosa Kronsteiner for NEW RELIGION- another perspective	Nominated			Best Music	
Rosa Kronsteiner for NEW RELIGION- another perspective	Nominated			RHYME SO - Fashion Blogger	Winner
Rosa Kronsteiner for NEW RELIGION- another perspective	Nominated			Inhuman Love	Nominated
Rosa Kronsteiner for NEW RELIGION- another perspective	Nominated			L.A.F.S	Nominated
Best Editing				"be ANOTHER" LEDIN Fashion Campaign 2019	Nominated
Age is Just a Number	Winner			Best Accessory Design	
Plateau N.1	Nominated			Fate	Winner
Dreams	Nominated			Le Bea Monde	Nominated
Woman Drivers	Nominated			NEW RELIGION- another perspective	Nominated
Best Costume Design				Essensual	Nominated
NEW RELIGION- another perspective	Winner			Best Make up and Hairstyle	
Pina	Nominated			Redemption	Winner
DRIVEN - WolkMorais	Nominated			COSMOS Fashion Film	Nominated
House of Liberty	Nominated			Destiny	Nominated
House of Liberty	Nominated			Fashion Inspiration	Nominated
Best Student Fashion Film				Best Major Brand Production	
NARS – Impermanence	Winner			Paris MON AMOUR	Winner
PRADA: Style To Die For	Nominated			Hermes San Francisco - ENDLESS JOURNEY	Nominated
Somewhere Blue	Nominated			Pursue	Nominated
MIU MIU the first Fragrance	Nominated			Fashion Blogger	Nominated
Best 2D & 3D Animation				Best Artistic Director	
Hermes San Francisco - ENDLESS JOURNEY	Winner			Inhuman love	Winner
Iron Effect	Nominated			Butterfly	Nominated
Season of Aeon	Nominated			Business as usual	Nominated
Pursue	Nominated	I'm gonna love me again		Nominated	
Best Emerging Talent				Best Visual Effects and Special Effects	
COSMOS Fashion Film	Winner			Inhuman LOVE	Winner
A Boring Dray In hell	Nominated			2091	Nominated
I am your hair dresser	Nominated			Hidden	Nominated
NOTHING IS QUITE AS IT MAY SEEM	Nominated			Pursue	Nominated
Redemption	Nominated			Pursue	Nominated
Best Emerging Talent					
"be ANOTHER" LEDIN Fashion Campaign 2019	Winner				
Missoni - American Lesson	Nominated				
BluCosette	Nominated				
I'm gonna love me again	Nominated				

== See also ==
- List of fashion film festivals
