= James Swanton =

English actor

James Swanton is an English actor, known for his roles in horror films and in stage shows based on the works of Charles Dickens.

== Background ==
Swanton was born and raised in York before going on to study English at Selwyn College, Cambridge. Whilst at Cambridge, he frequently acted with the Marlowe Society. He became associated with "roles that could be described as outcasts or grotesques" and played Quasimodo in a stage production of The Hunchback of Notre Dame.

== Career ==
=== Theatre ===
Swanton made his professional stage debut in the one-man play Sikes & Nancy at the Mercury Theatre, Colchester. The show was based on Charles Dickens's own 1868 adaptation of Oliver Twist. Sikes & Nancy later toured across the UK and ran at the West End's Trafalgar Studios, in repertory with Miss Havisham's Expectations starring Linda Marlowe. Then aged 23, Swanton was, according to The Telegraph, "the youngest actor ever to write, direct and star in a one-man West End show". For this performance, Swanton studied Henry Irving in The Bells and Donald Wolfit in King Lear to help him "recapture the spirit of melodramatic acting".

Since 2017, Swanton has presented one-man plays at the Charles Dickens Museum, the author's only surviving London home. These shows have usually consisted of Dickens's ghost stories, including A Christmas Carol, The Chimes, The Haunted Man, The Trial for Murder and The Signal-Man. Swanton's Dickens Museum performances have received coverage from The New York Times and the BBC.

Swanton played Victor Carroon in the 70th anniversary production of The Quatermass Experiment at Alexandra Palace (the location from which Nigel Kneale's original BBC serial had been transmitted in 1953) in a cast that included Alice Lowe, Kevin McNally and Mark Gatiss as Professor Quatermass. Swanton also won Outstanding Performing Artist in the York Culture Awards for his stage roles as Lucifer in the York Mystery Plays and Count Dracula in Dracula.

=== Film ===
Most of Swanton’s film appearances have been in the horror genre. He has been described by Sight and Sound as a "horror expert" and has cited Conrad Veidt and Boris Karloff as "profound inspirations" on his acting style.

Swanton made his first film appearance as Daddy in the horror-comedy Double Date. In an interview, he referred to his character as a "zombified family patriarch who was resurrected via a dark satanic ritual". Double Date also marked his first collaboration with special-effects make-up artist Dan Martin, with whom he has regularly worked since.

Another early film role was the Creature in Frankenstein's Creature. This single-take one-man production was made in 2018 to mark the bicentenary of the publication of Mary Shelley's Frankenstein and had its premiere at that year's FrightFest. Swanton also wrote the screenplay, which he adapted from the stage version he had performed at Theatre503. Speaking to SFX, director Sam Ashurst said it was "the most faithful cinematic rendition of Mary Shelley’s book."

Swanton came to greater prominence with his role as the Spirit in Host, which was released during the COVID-19 pandemic in 2020. This film, made entirely under the UK's lockdown conditions, involved remote collaboration with the director Rob Savage, with Swanton creating his own make-up and devising such moments as a jump scare on a staircase. He has also worked with Savage on the short film Salt and the Blumhouse feature film Dashcam, in both of which he appeared as monstrous entities.

In 2024, Swanton played the Antichrist's father in two major prequels to occult-themed horror films: the Jackal in The First Omen and Satan in Apartment 7A. He featured on many of the posters for the latter alongside Julia Garner. That same year, he played the dual role of the Hermit and the Magician in Tarot.

Swanton's other horror roles have included the Beast in The Severed Sun, the Ash Man in Stopmotion, SAL-E Sparx in Broadcast Signal Intrusion and the eponymous Thing in The Thing That Ate the Birds.

=== Television ===
Swanton played the title character of the Mummy in Lot No. 249, the BBC's 2023 Ghost Story for Christmas, after being personally offered the role by director and writer Mark Gatiss. For this part, Swanton received the Dracula Society's Hamilton Deane Award. His co-star Kit Harington called his performance "genuinely scary".

Shortly afterwards, Swanton was again the title character in "The Curse of the Ninth", the penultimate episode of Inside No. 9, this time working with Gatiss's League of Gentlemen colleagues Reece Shearsmith and Steve Pemberton.
