= Julian Strøm =

Norwegian actor (1901–1992)

- Julian Strøm in Felix (1921)
- Born: February 24, 1901; Kristiania (now Oslo), Norway
- Died: October 7, 1992 (aged 91); Oslo, Norway
- Occupations: Actor, theater director

Julian Tidemann Strøm (February 24, 1901 – October 7, 1992) was a Norwegian actor and theater director. He is known as a pioneer of Norwegian puppet theater.

== Family ==
Julian Strøm was the son of the artisan Julius Strøm and his wife Marie Kristine. He married the teacher Selma Hanna Johnsgård (1901–1989) in 1927. He was the father of the puppeteers Birgit Strøm and Elisabeth Strøm Henriksen, and the grandfather of the actress and director Camilla Strøm Henriksen.

== Career ==
Strøm grew up in Kristiania (now Oslo) and studied acting. He performed as a student at the National Theatre in Oslo, and he made his debut at the private Mayol Theater in 1920. In the early 1920s, Strøm was engaged at the Stavanger Theater, where he staged Veslefrikk med fela (Little Freddy and His Fiddle) with children in all the roles. He later moved back to his hometown, where he joined the artists' colony in Ekeberg. In the 1930s and 1940s, Strøm held reading and cultural evenings. He also ran his own one-man theater with support from the church and the Ministry of Education, and later also in a touring partnership with the National Traveling Theater.

=== Puppet theater ===
Strøm was head of the People's Theater (Folketeatret) puppet theater from 1953 to 1959, which became a platform for him to develop his ideas. Puppet theater was not widespread in Norway at that time, and Strøm's goal was for it to become a recognized art form. The first production at the People's Theater puppet theater was Gjete kongens harer (The Shepherd for the King's Hares), which was based on the folk tale of the same name.

When the People's Theater merged with the New Theater (Det Nye Teater) in 1959 to form the Oslo New Theater, Strøm moved there. Strøm's daughter Birgit Strøm took over the management of the Oslo New Theater Puppet Theater.

Strøm participated in a number of puppet theater performances and adventure series for NRK's children's and youth department through Julian Strøms Dukketeater (Julian Strøm's Puppet Theater) at the broadcaster.

=== Film ===
Strøm was also a film actor, and he debuted as the title character in Rasmus Breistein's film Felix in 1921. After that it was 50 years until his next film appearance, when he played Johannes Bakken in Per Blom's film Anton in 1973. This role won Strøm the Golden Shrimp (Den gyldne reke) award in Drøbak that same year. Strøm also appeared in other films in the 1970s.

== Awards ==
Strøm received the King's Medal of Merit in gold in 1978.

== Filmography ==
- 1921: Felix
- 1973: Anton
- 1975: Hustruer
- 1976: Reisen til julestjernen

== Television films ==
- 1965: Den forvandlede brudgom (NRK theater department, voice role)
- 1975: Prototypen – en av mange (NRK theater department) as Anders Kristiansen
- 1979: Mareritt ved midtsommer as Markus the fisherman
