= The Problem with People =

Irish comedy film

- Film poster
- Directed by: Chris Cottam
- Screenplay by: Paul Reiser; Wally Marzano-Lesnevich
- Produced by: Paul Reiser; Max Brady; Chris Cottam
- Starring: Paul Reiser; Colm Meaney; Jane Levy; Lucianne McEvoy
- Cinematography: Richard Kendrick; David Odd
- Edited by: Gareth McEwan
- Music by: Steven Argila
- Production companies: Nuance Prods; Maxfilms
- Distributed by: Quiver Distribution
- Release date: 2023
- Running time: 101 minutes
- Country: Ireland
- Language: English

The Problem with People is a 2023 Irish-set buddy comedy film co-written, produced by and starring Paul Reiser. It is directed by Chris Cottam and is also starring Colm Meaney, Lucianne McEvoy and Jane Levy.

== Premise ==
Jewish cousins are asked to heal a family feud as a man's dying wish.

== Plot ==
In Ireland, Ciárán cares for his father Fergus, who is near death. Fergus asks him to heal the long-standing rift with their American relatives. Ciárán contacts Barry, a cousin in New York, who agrees to visit after encouragement from his daughter.

Barry travels to Ireland and is welcomed by Ciárán and the local community. Initial meetings suggest that Fergus’s wish for reconciliation may be fulfilled. Shortly afterwards, Fergus dies, and his will reveals that part of his estate is to be left to Barry. This causes tension between the cousins, with disagreements over inheritance and belonging.

As the cousins argue, old resentments resurface and the feud escalates, drawing in members of the village. A series of comic disputes and misunderstandings follow, testing both men’s patience and loyalty to family. Despite repeated conflicts, Ciárán and Barry gradually begin to understand each other. By the end, the two reach a tentative truce, hinting at the possibility of reconciliation.

== Cast ==
- Paul Reiser as Barry
- Colm Meaney as Ciáran
- Jane Levy as Natalya
- Lucianne McEvoy as Fiona
- Des Keogh as Fergus
- Eimear Morrissey as SGT. Lizzie McGrath

== Production ==
The film was written by Paul Reiser and Wally Marzano-Lesnevich, and directed by Chris Cottam. It was first announced in June 2022.

Reiser also served as a producer, alongside Max Brady and Cottam. The cinematographers were Richard Kendrick and David Odd. The cast includes Reiser, Colm Meaney, Jane Levy, Lucianne McEvoy and Des Keogh.

Principal photography took place in County Wicklow, Ireland, with filming in and around Tinahely, as well as in Blessington and Valleymount. A farmhouse in Knockatomocoyle, near Tinahely, was also used to depict a family homestead.

== Release ==
The film had its world premiere at the 2023 Austin Film Festival. It is distributed by Quiver Distribution in the United States and had a theatrical release on 4 October 2024. The film was released in Ireland on 8 November 2024.
