= Jemma Moore =

British actress (born 1992)

- Born: 18 March 1992 (age 34); Hong Kong
- Education: Queen Mary University of London; Royal Central School of Speech and Drama
- Occupation: Actress
- Years active: 2013–present
- Notable work: Host

Jemma Moore (born 18 March 1992) is a British actress and filmmaker.

== Early life and education ==
Jemma Moore was born on 18 March 1992 in Hong Kong to a Chinese mother and British father and moved to England when she was three, where she grew up on a farm in rural Shropshire before moving to Leominster when she was 10.

Moore attended Moreton Hall School in Oswestry. She went on to graduate with a Bachelor of Arts (BA) degree in English literature and drama from Queen Mary University of London. She then pursued a Master of Arts (MA) degree at the Royal Central School of Speech and Drama.

== Career ==
One of her first screen roles was in 2013 The Double working alongside Paddy Considine and directed by Richard Ayoade. She was producer of the short film Exile Incessant which won Best Narrative Short at Let’s All Be Free Festival 2016 and Best African film at the San Francisco Black Film Festival the same year. She appeared in Patty Jenkins film Wonder Woman as a member of the Queen's Guard, and produced an all female-crewed short film, All of Me that premiered at Cannes Film Festival and was an official selection at Palm Springs Film Festival. The film also won the Award of Excellence at the Indie Fest Awards 2017.

In 2017, she was the American Broadcasting Company's first British winner of the ABC Discovers talent competition, and with it a one-year talent deal with ABC. She was described as "an extremely talented and skilled actress with a fresh voice,” by ABC's senior VP, talent and casting, Ayo Davis.

In 2019, she appeared in BBC One detective series Shakespeare & Hathaway: Private Investigators. She played the role of Li in Tony Giglio’s Doom: Annihilation. She also started her own podcast The HobbyCast in which she interviews guests about their hobbies.

She played Jemma in the 2020 lockdown horror film Host. The character was subsequently included as one of The 100 Best Horror Movie Characters by Empire magazine. She worked with the creative team behind Host again for the 2021 horror film Dashcam and 2023 short horror film Flashback for Netflix.

She directed the short comedy film Stalling it and also appeared in Scottish comedy series Two Doors Down. She voiced the ghost of Annabel Ward in Joe Cornish young adult series Lockwood & Co in 2023.

She could be seen as journalist Jess Li in the main cast of 2024's Red Eye, a British thriller television series for ITVX. The series was renewed for a second season in September 2024 with Moore confirmed to be returning. That year, she filmed the science-fiction film Moonquake written by Nicole Bartlett and directed by Tom Paton.

== Personal life ==
Moore received a dyslexia diagnosis at university and later also received an autism and an ADHD diagnosis. She has discussed the possibility that she "found acting at a young age because I felt so different from other people and acting/drama was a safe space to explore what it is like to be human". She is pansexual.

Moore's great aunt Eve Moore was an actress who was married to distinguished commander Guy Gibson.

== Partial filmography ==
Year	Title	Role	Notes
2013	The Double		
2017	Wonder Woman	Queen's Guard	
2019	Doom: Annihilation	Li	
2019	Shakespeare & Hathaway: Private Investigators	Rose Lin	1 episode
2020	Stalling It	Jo	Short film
2020	Host	Gemma	
2022	Two Doors Down	Lin	1 episode
2022	Dashcam		
2023	Silent Witness	Mia	2 episodes
2023	Flashback	Jess	Short film
2023	Lockwood & Co	Annabel Ward	3 episodes (voice)
2024	7 Keys	Izzy	
2024-present	Red Eye	Jess Li	
TBA	Moonquake	Elise	
