= Stephen Rahman-Hughes =

British-Malaysian actor

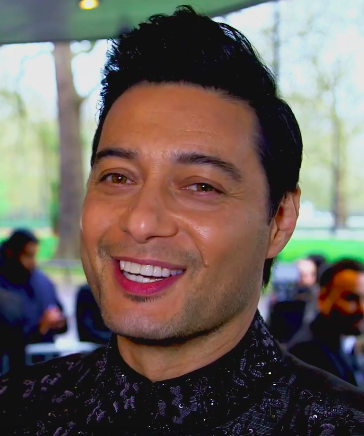
- Rahman-Hughes in 2019
- Born: 26 January 1970 (age 56); London, England
- Occupations: Actor; Singer
- Years active: 2004–present
- Children: 3

Stephen Rahman-Hughes (born 26 January 1970) is a British–Malaysian actor and singer with Cymru ancestry. He is known for his roles as Merong Mahawangsa in the 2011 film The Malay Chronicles: Bloodlines and Adam Bateman in the BBC soap opera EastEnders.

== Career ==
In 2006, Rahman-Hughes starred as Hang Tuah in the Malaysian musical production of Puteri Gunung Ledang. Later in 2006, Rahman-Hughes made his television debut in the Sky One drama series Dream Team. In 2007, he became a vocalist in a male opera group, Teatro.

In 2011, Rahman-Hughes became the lead actor of Malaysian film The Malay Chronicles: Bloodlines. In August 2018, he joined EastEnders as Adam Bateman, a dentist. It was announced on 28 September 2019 that his character was axed from the show. Adam's final episode aired on 3 December 2019.

== Filmography ==
Film
Year	Title	Role	Notes
2008	Los dan Faun	Dick Johnson	
2011	The Malay Chronicles: Bloodlines	Merong Mahawangsa	
2014	Cut	The Actor	Short film
2019	Shadowplay	Dr Keith	

Television
Year	Title	Role	Note
2004	Bad Girls	Stuart Jones	Episode: "The Darkest Hour"
2005	Dream Team	Carl Caskey	Recurring role
2005	Doctors	Jayant Chopra	Episode: "Leap in the Dark"
2006–2007, 2025	Emmerdale	Vikesh Dasari	Recurring role
2006	The Afternoon Play	James Khan	Episode: "Molly"
2007	Highlander: The Source	Zai Jie	Television film
2011–2012	The Kitchen Musical	Alex Marcus	Main role
2011	Doctors	Asif Khan	Episode: "Every Heart That Beats"
2013	Bollywood Carmen	Don	Television film
2018–2019	EastEnders	Adam Bateman	Regular role
2019	Almost Never	Dev	Recurring role
2023	Sister Boniface Mysteries	Harinder Ray	Episode: "The Star of the Orient"
2024	3 Body Problem	Anwar Suleiman	Recurring role
