= Ummi Nazeera =

Malaysian actress

- اوممي نازايرا
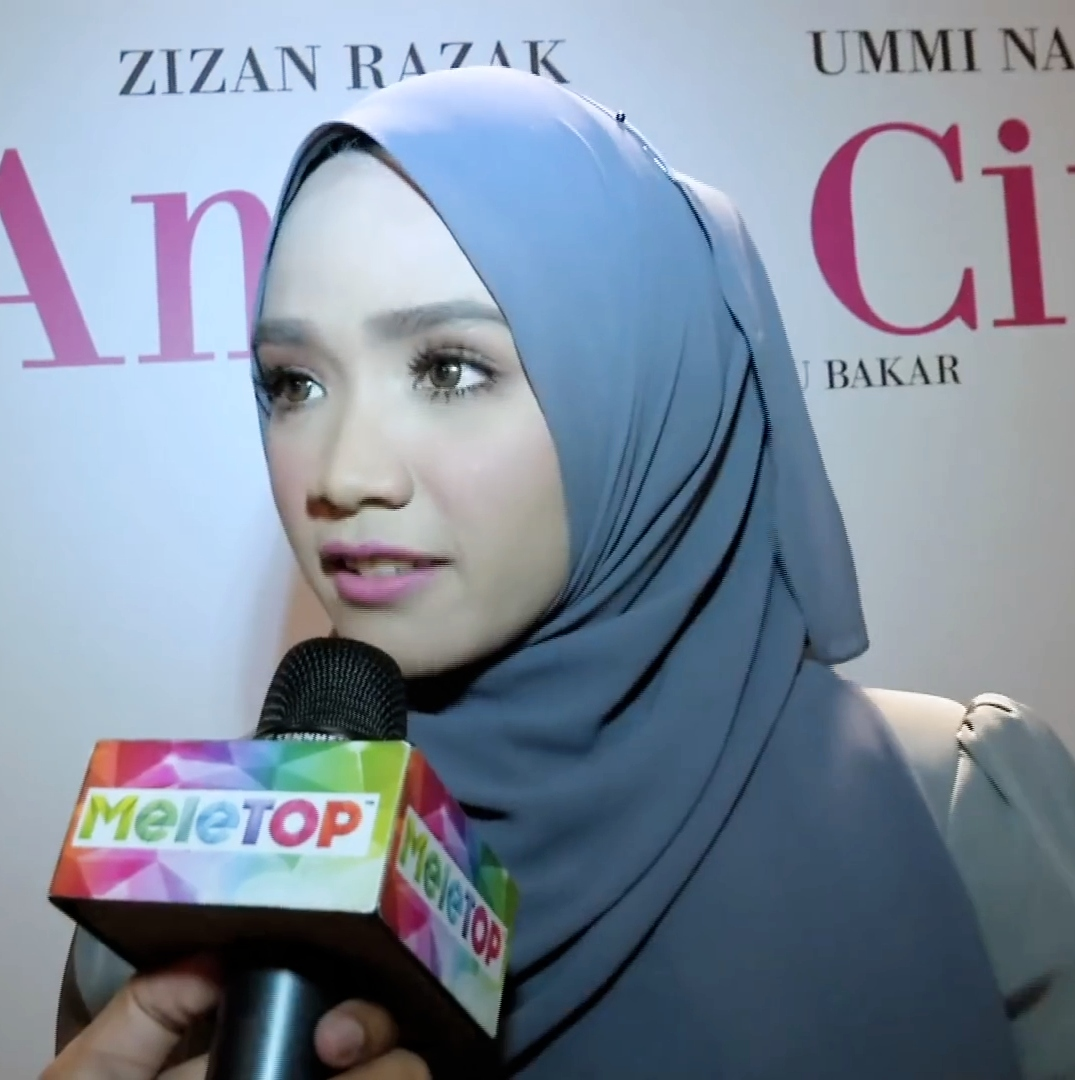
- Ummi, interviewed by MeleTOP at the telefilm press conference Angin Cinta, on 31 May 2016
- Born: Ummi Nazeera Nur Hidayah binti Zainul Abidin; 20 August 1990 (age 36); Besut, Terengganu, Malaysia
- Education: Royal Melbourne Institute of Technology (BBus)
- Occupations: Actor; model
- Years active: 2008–present
- Spouse: Dr Mohd Izzar Anwari Abdul Khani (m. 2017)
- Children: 2
- Relatives: Nazreem Musa (brother)

Ummi Nazeera Nur Hidayah Zainul Abidin (born 20 August 1990) is a Malaysian actress acclaimed for her work in television and film.

== Career ==
Ummi Nazeera made a name for herself in the Malaysian acting scene through her role in the 2009 TV3 drama series Nur Kasih. She worked alongside a talented cast of actors, including Remy Ishak, Tiz Zaqyah⁣, and Fizz Fairuz, until broadcasting ended at the end of March of that year. The following year, she appeared in the hit 2010 comedy film Hantu Kak Limah Balik Rumah, produced by Tayangan Unggul.

== Personal life ==
On 23 July 2017, Ummi married Dr. Mohd Izzar Anwari Abdul Khani, a doctor from Kuala Lumpur, in a ceremony at approximately 10:45 a.m. at the residence of her uncle, Datuk Aziz Mat Akhir, in the Bukit Tunku neighbourhood. Initially, the couple was expected to marry on 3 August 2017 but the date was brought forward to 23 July at the request of the family.

On 22 August 2018, she gave birth to her first child, a daughter named Ayra Aneesah.

Her father, Zainul Abidin Mat Akhir, died on 27 November 2020 due to chronic health problems.

On 1 June 2021, she gave to birth to her second daughter, Aysha Arsylia.

== Filmography ==
=== Films ===
Year	Title	Character	Notes
2010	Lu Pikirlah Sendiri De Movie	Syarifah	First film
2010	Hantu Kak Limah Balik Rumah	Cik Nin	
2011	Hikayat Merong Mahawangsa	Embok	
2013	Penanggal	Murni	
2017	Bisik Pada Langit	Siti Hajar	
2018	Gol & Gincu Vol. 2	Yaya	
2021	Kerana Corona	Janna	
2025	The Original Gangster		Post-production

=== Drama ===
Year	Title	Character	TV channels	Note
2008	Ali Din	Puteri	TV9	The first drama
2008	Awan Dania	Hannah	Astro Ria	
2009	Klon Teja	Yasmin	Astro Prima	
2009	Nur Kasih	Sarah	TV3	
2015	Alif Imani	Imani	TV9	
2016	Patahnya Sebelah Sayap	Alisha	TV3	
2017	Nahu Rindu	Nazira	TV3	
2018	Patahnya Sebelah Sayap 2	Alisha	TV3	4 Episodes
2019	Suri Katriana	Katriana	Astro Prima	
2020	Korban Kasih	Aisha	TV1	
2021	Cinta Yang Pulang	Adina	TV2	
2022	Risik Pada Hati	Hayfa	TV3	
2022	Rindu Kasih	Salina	TV3	
2023	Sekali Aku Bahgia	Rania Farahain	TV3	
2023	Surat Dari Tuhan	Suzana	TV3	
2024	Rindu Kasih 2	Salina	TV3	
2024	Dia Dari Syurga	Raisha	TV1	
2024	Andai Tiada Dia	Suri	Astro Ria	
2025	Teratak Kasih Salina	Salina	TV3	
2026	Pak Su Ammara	Miza	Astro Ria	

=== Telefilm ===
Year	Title	Character	TV Channel	Notes
2008	Kudrat Iman	Asmah	TV1	First telefilm
2015	Cik Puan Cinderella	Fifi	Astro Maya HD	
2015	Cinta Qasidah	Qasidah	Astro Ria	
2016	Angin Cinta	Erika	Astro First Exclusive	
2020	Luluh	Suri	TV3	
2021	Kain Kafan Berbisik	Shaza	TV2	
2023	Yek Icin Mahak	Teacher Aisyah	TV1	
2023	Misi Adeena	virtual	TV1	
2025	Andai Tiada Dia Raya	Suri	Astro Ria	
2025	Bilal and Abah	Fatihah	TV AlHijrah	

=== Web Drama ===
Year	Title	Character	Channels	Note
2017	Chor & Chah	Chah	YouTube	
2018	Chor & Chah 2	Chah	YouTube	
2025	Saat Aku Tahu	Maira	Viu	

=== Television ===
Year	Title	Role	TV channels	Note
2014	Salam Muslim: Quran Untuk OKU	Intermediary	Astro Oasis	
2017	Sepahtu Al-Puasa Reunion	Dila	Astro Warna	Guest Artist: Episode "Hitam Putih Ramadan"
2018	Glamnista	Host	OK TV	
2019	Sepahtu Reunion Live 2019	Azizah	Astro Warna	Guest Artist: Episode "Penarek Becha Vol.2"
2020	Glam Ke Teng'glam	Guest Artist	Awesome TV	Episode 2, with Zara Zya
2024	Sepahtu Reunion Al-Raya	Dian	Astro Warna	Guest Artist: Episode "Kasih Ayah Sepanjang Masa"

=== Siniar ===
Year	Title	Role	Notes
2024	Borak Selebriti	Guest Guest	

== Awards and nominations ==
Year	Award	Category	Nomination	Results
2014	26th Malaysian Film Festival	Best Actress	Penanggal	Nominated
2018	31st Daily Star Popular Awards	Popular Female Film Actress	Ummie Nazeera	Nominated
2018	2018 Kuala Lumpur Film Critics Association Awards	Best Supporting Actress	Bisik Pada Langit	Nominated
2019	2019 Screen Awards	Best Actress in a Film	Gol & Gincu Vol. 2	Nominated
2023	Tonton Anugerah Drama Sangat 2023	Best Actress	Risik Pada Hati	Won
