= Indi Nadarajah =

Malaysian actor (born 1959)

- இந்தி நடராஜா
- Born: 2 July 1959 (age 67); Kuala Lumpur, Federation of Malaya
- Occupations: Actor, comedian, singer
- Years active: 1989–present
- Known for: Comedy Court; Setem

Indi Nadarajah (Tamil: இந்தி நடராஜா; born 2 July 1959) is an actor and comedian based in Kuala Lumpur, Malaysia. He regularly performs on the Malaysian stage for both public and private shows. At present, he works with fellow Malaysian actor Allan Perera in a comedy duo called Comedy Court. Apart from his work on stage, he has also starred in the film Setem (2009) and features in the Channel 4 drama Indian Summers (2015).

== Early life ==
Nadarajah was born in Kuala Lumpur to Sri Lankan Tamil parents. He attended Cochrane Road School in Kuala Lumpur and Oswestry School in Shropshire, England. After finishing school, he returned to Malaysia and became involved in the amateur theatre scene, performing with the then Liberal Arts Society among others.

== Career ==
Nadarajah started his acting career working with the Instant Café Theatre, of which he was an early member. In 1994, the Instant Café produced The Oblong Bar, a short play devised within the company by Nadarajah, which was later developed into a full-length play titled Quid Pro Quo. In 1997, he began work on a comedy duo, along with fellow Malaysian actor Allan Perera, called Comedy Court. The pair celebrated their 10th anniversary in 2007 and still continue to perform shows at the present time.

== Filmography ==
- Setem (2009)

== TV shows ==
- Silver Lining
- Crossings
- Small Mission Enterprise
- Indian Summers

== Awards ==
In 2002, Nadarajah was awarded the BOH Cameronian Arts Award for Best Acting Ensemble (along with Allan Perera) for his starring role in The Actor's Studio, Malaysia production of The Importance of Being Earnest by Oscar Wilde. In 2009, he was nominated for Best Supporting Actor for his role in Setem (2009) by the Malaysia Film Festival.
