= Birgit Strøm =

Norwegian actress and puppeteer (1931–2007)

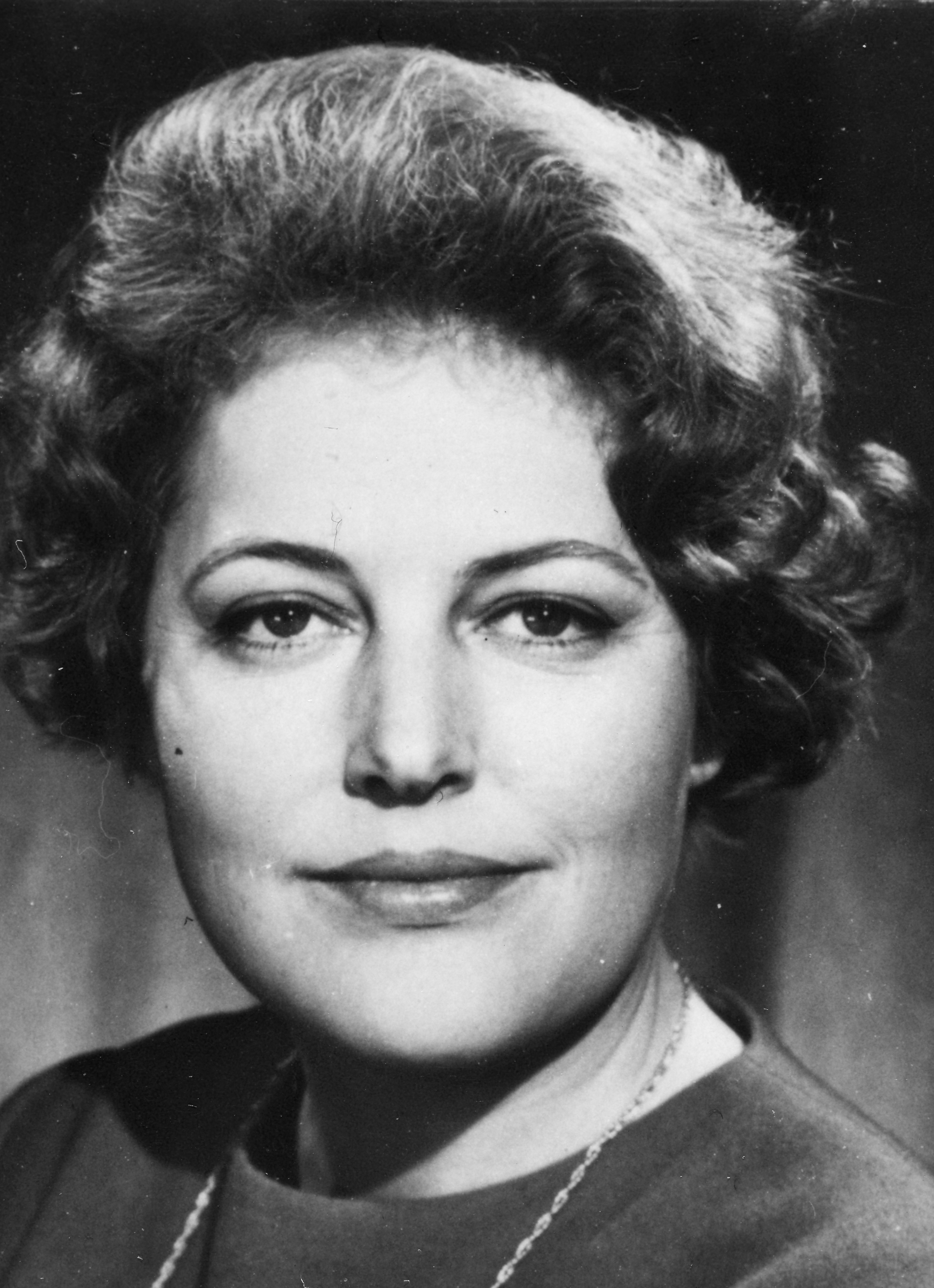
- Birgit Strøm, c. 1965
- Born: Birgit Målfrid Strøm; 9 August 1931; Oslo, Norway
- Died: 11 January 2007 (aged 75)
- Occupations: Actress; dramatic advisor; non-fiction writer; puppeteer; singer
- Father: Julian Strøm
- Relatives: Elisabeth Strøm Henriksen (sister)

Birgit Målfrid Strøm (9 August 1931 – 11 January 2007) was a Norwegian actress, puppeteer, dramatic adviser, singer and non-fiction writer. She was born in Oslo. She was the daughter of the actor Julian Strøm and the sister of the puppeteer and actress Elisabeth Strøm Henriksen.

She is known for giving voice to the puppets Titten Tei and Jon Arthur Vimsen. Her stage adaptations include fairy tales such as Det var en gang and Gjete kongens harer, and Alf Prøysen's Teskjekjerringa på teater. Among her song recordings are "Pappa'n til Tove Mette" and "Gøy på landet" (Wheezy Anna).

== Selected works ==
- Dukketeater i Norden (1973)
- Dukketeatrets historie (2004)
