= Host (film) =

2020 film by Rob Savage

- Theatrical release poster
- Directed by: Rob Savage
- Written by: Jed Shepherd; Gemma Hurley; Rob Savage
- Produced by: Douglas Cox; Craig Engler; Emily Gotto; Samuel Zimmerman
- Starring: Haley Bishop; Radina Drandova; Jemma Moore; Caroline Ward; Emma Webb; Edward Linard
- Edited by: Brenna Rangott
- Production companies: Shadowhouse Films; BOO-URNS
- Distributed by: Shudder; Vertigo Releasing
- Release dates: 30 July 2020 (Shudder); 4 December 2020 (United Kingdom)
- Running time: 56 minutes
- Country: United Kingdom
- Language: English
- Budget: $100,000
- Box office: $443,807

Host is a 2020 British independent screenlife supernatural horror film directed by Rob Savage, who co-wrote it with Gemma Hurley and Jed Shepherd. A screenlife film that takes place entirely on a Zoom video call, it follows a group of friends who inadvertently summon a demon during an online séance.

After the viral success of a short prank video by Savage featuring a handful of the film's cast, he developed the concept into a feature-length film, which was shot over 12 weeks directly on the Zoom software during the COVID-19 pandemic. The cast members were in charge of their own cameras, sound, makeup, lighting, and stunts, with Savage directing them remotely from his home.

Host debuted on Shudder on 30 July 2020, and was released in cinemas and digital platforms by Vertigo Releasing on 4 December 2020. The film received positive reviews from critics, who praised its themes of social anxiety, its use of jump scares, and the cast's chemistry.

== Plot ==
During a July 2020 COVID-19 lockdown in London, friends Haley, Jemma, Radina, Emma, Caroline, and Teddy join the weekly Zoom call they have been using to stay in touch. Haley has arranged for them to partake in a virtual séance led by the medium Seylan, who emphasizes that they should not disrespect the spirits, though only Haley and Caroline take it seriously.

Teddy is forced to leave the call when his girlfriend Jinny disconnects him. Jemma claims to feel intense tension around her neck and begins to cry, explaining that she feels the presence of a school friend who killed himself by hanging. Seylan's internet cuts out and disconnects her from the call, prompting a laughing Jemma to admit that she made the story up because she was bored, which angers Haley. While they are arguing, Haley's chair is suddenly pulled across the room, to the shock of the group. A series of terrifying phenomena commence: the legs of a hanging corpse appear in Caroline's attic when she goes to investigate a noise; when Haley points her instant camera down the hallway to take a photo of her living room, it shows a similar figure hanging from the ceiling; and Emma's wine glass shatters untouched.

As the girls panic, Haley gets back in touch with Seylan and explains the situation. Seylan explains that Jemma's prank, fabricating a deceased person, may have led a demon to take on the guise of the deceased person and the identity like a mask, allowing the demon to pass into the living's world. She instructs them to close the séance, but the demon interrupts her and she is disconnected again. The girls attempt to close the circle following her instructions.

Relieved that the ordeal seems to be over, the group members begin preparing to leaving the call, when Caroline suddenly appears to be flung into the camera. Emma, forgetting to switch off a filter, turns her camera towards her living room, where the filter places a mask on the face of an invisible figure which then turns to look at her. She scatters flour on the floor, in which footprints approaching her appear, and she is attacked before escaping into her bedroom. Alan's body drops down behind Radina, prompting her to flee, but the demon kills her. Caroline's camera turns back on to show the demon smashing her head into her keyboard while she pleads for help before cutting out.

Haley is pulled backward through the door of her room. Jemma, who lives around the corner from Haley, rushes over. Teddy returns to the call to see that only Emma remains. Unaware of everything that has occurred, Teddy believes Emma is playing a prank on him, but he is attacked by the demon after it takes the form of a horrifying humanoid figure. He is chased into his garden, where Jinny is lifted into the air and has her neck snapped. He runs away and hides, using a lighter to see where he is going, but the demon distracts him with an eerie music box his brother used to scare him with as a child. The demon knocks him down and he drops the lighter, causing a fire that burns him to death.

Emma's bedroom door opens, and she throws a blanket which drapes itself over an invisible human shape. She opens her window to escape, and falls to her death. Jemma breaks into Haley's home, and the demon smashes a bottle against her head and starts to destroy the kitchen, but Jemma recovers and finds Haley hiding under her desk. They attempt to escape the house using the flash from Haley's camera to light the way. The demon appears in the final flash of light, and rushes at them as the Zoom call timer expires.

== Cast ==
- Haley Bishop as Haley
- Jemma Moore as Jemma
- Emma Louise Webb as Emma
- Radina Drandova as Radina
- Caroline Ward as Caroline
- Edward Linard as Teddy
- Seylan Baxter as Seylan
- Jinny Lofthouse as Jinny
- Alan Emrys as Alan
- Patrick Ward as Caroline's dad
- James Swanton as the Spirit

== Production ==
The film traces back to a prank video created by Savage in early 2020, which featured him investigating strange sounds in his attic while on a group video chat with the subjects of the prank, some of whom would later star in Host. The participants of the call were unaware that the video was leading up to a jump scare of a zombie child, which Savage created by splicing a clip from the Spanish horror film Rec (2007) with footage of himself climbing up to the attic and subsequently falling down "dead" after the zombie attacks him. Savage placed the video online, where it went viral. He found the format easy to watch and chose to apply it to a feature-length film. He has stated that the prank's success enabled him to create Host, after producers contacted him about making a longer film upon seeing the viral video.

Host was filmed while quarantine restrictions were in place due to the COVID-19 pandemic; Savage directed the actors remotely while they were in charge of their own cameras, lighting, sound, makeup, and stunts. According to Savage, "old school" technology was often used for special effects, with fishing wire being sent to the actors' homes "so they could practice pulling things off shelves". Practical effects were also handled by the actors and a virtual workshop was held on how to set up effects such as "moving doors [and] making things fly off shelves". Savage stated that the film took 12 weeks to complete, from the initial idea to its delivery to streaming platform Shudder.

According to star Jemma Moore, the actors used a film treatment rather than a finished screenplay as the basis for their performances, as well as improvising and taking live feedback from Savage during their takes: "It had all the points, they were really fleshed out and detailed, but we improvised around a lot of stuff. And Rob would be typing on Zoom while we're in the middle of a scene, telling us what to say—it was like live scripting—or he'd private message me." In an attempt to encourage authentic responses by the cast to the film's events, the cast participated in a séance over Zoom prior to filming; the actors were also only given details of their own characters, with the fates of the other characters being withheld from them. Savage and Shepherd have mentioned several influences on the film, including The Blair Witch Project, Paranormal Activity, Lake Mungo, and Ghostwatch, noting that Host contains references to a number of these.

== Release ==
Host debuted on the streaming platform Shudder in the United Kingdom and North America on 30 July 2020. The film was released in cinemas and on digital platforms in the UK and Ireland on 4 December 2020 by Vertigo Releasing.

== Reception ==
=== Box office ===
Host grossed $443,807 worldwide against a budget of $100,000.

=== Critical response ===
On the review aggregator website Rotten Tomatoes, the film holds an approval rating of 99% based on 98 reviews, with an average rating of 7.8/10. The website's critics consensus reads, "Lean, suspenseful, and scary, Host uses its timely premise to deliver a nastily effective treat for horror enthusiasts." On Metacritic, which assigns a weighted average score out of 100 to reviews from mainstream critics, the film received an average score of 73, based on seven critics, indicating "generally favorable" reviews.

Common praise for Host centered around its themes of social separation and social anxiety. The New York Times and Rue Morgue made comparisons between the film and Unfriended (2014), a horror film that also featured supernatural activity occurring during a group video chat. Time magazine named it one of the "17 Great Movies You May Have Missed This Summer" and stated that it is "not only one of the best horror movies of the year, but also an intimate look at creativity, film production and a shared global culture in the throes of a rampaging virus". Referring to the film's novel portrayal of lockdown-induced paranoia, Elizabeth Horkley of The Atlantic called it "the first great entry in the new genre of 'quarantine horror'."

=== Accolades ===
Award	Year	Nominated	Category	Result	Ref.
British Independent Film Awards	2021	Douglas Cox	Breakthrough Producer	Nominated	
British Independent Film Awards	2021	Brenna Rangott	Best Editing	Nominated	
British Independent Film Awards	2021	Calum Sample	Best Sound	Nominated	
Hollywood Critics Association	2021	Host	Best Horror Film	Nominated	
Rondo Hatton Classic Horror Awards	2020	Rob Savage	Best Independent Film	Nominated	
