= Jing Lusi =

British actress

- Born: Lu Sijing; Shanghai, China
- Education: University College London
- Occupation: Actress
- Years active: 2010–present

Chinese name
- Traditional Chinese: 陸思敬
- Simplified Chinese: 陆思敬
Transcriptions
Standard Mandarin
- Hanyu Pinyin: Lù Sījìng

Jing Lusi (born Lu Sijing; simplified Chinese: 陆思敬; traditional Chinese: 陸思敬) is a Chinese-born British actress. She is best known for her roles in Stan Lee's Lucky Man (2016), the film Crazy Rich Asians (2018) and the 2020 TV series Gangs of London. She has presented for the BBC documentaries My Chinese New Year (2015) and Chinese New Year: The Biggest Celebration on Earth (2016). Since 2024, she has starred in the ITV thriller series Red Eye. In 2026 a second series, Red Eye, Crimson Icharus was released.

== Early life and education ==
Jing Lusi was born in Pudong, Shanghai, China, and moved with her parents to the United Kingdom at the age of five. Her family settled in Southampton; her father was granted a scholarship for a master's programme at the university. She studied at Peter Symonds College, Winchester, then read law at University College London.

== Career ==
Jing Lusi's first television role was in the BBC's BAFTA award-winning medical drama series Holby City. She made her debut in 2012, playing Tara Lo. In 2013, she left the cast when her character died during neurosurgery, her final episode airing on 16 April 2013. She has starred in TV shows such as Stan Lee's Lucky Man as the villainous Lily-Anne Lau alongside James Nesbitt, played detectives in Scott & Bailey and Gangs of London, and has made guest appearances in shows like Matthew Weiner's anthology series The Romanoffs.

In films, she has appeared in the 2015 action thriller Survivor, and was in the main cast of Crazy Rich Asians (2018) as Amanda Ling and Heart of Stone (2023) as MI6 agent Theresa Yang.

On stage, Jing Lusi performed as Amanda in the Pulitzer Prize shortlisted play 4000 Miles at the Theatre Royal, Bath and The Print Room in London in 2013, for which she received critical acclaim. The Independent described her performance as, "cruelly well observed, and very funny... Jing Lusi nails the narcissism and the ridiculous, relentless self-promotion of the Facebook age".

She performed at Edinburgh Fringe Festival 2015 as part of a collective of comedians in Immigrant Diaries; a comedy story telling show aimed to 'show a different side' to the heaviness of the topic during the General Election of the same year.

In 2015–16, she hosted the Chinese New Year celebrations in Trafalgar Square and was the subject of the BBC One programme My Chinese New Year, which was broadcast on 1 March 2015.

She starred in a lead role for the ITV's Red Eye in 2024. The series was picked up for a second series in 2025.

== Personal life ==
In 2021 and 2025, Lusi was a key witness in high-profile court cases involving Noel Clarke, in which she, along with many other women, alleged that he had engaged in sexual misconduct.

== Filmography ==
Film
Year	Title	Role	Notes
2009	Breathe	Lauren	
2011	The Malay Chronicles: Bloodlines	Meng Li Hua	
2011	Jack Falls	Carly	
2012	Tezz	Reporter	
2015	Survivor	Joyce Su	
2018	Crazy Rich Asians	Amanda Ling	
2021	SAS: Red Notice	Zada	
2023	Heart of Stone	Theresa Yang	
2024	Argylle	Li Na	

Television
Year	Title	Role	Notes
2012–2013	Holby City	Dr. Tara Lo-Valentine	Recurring role, 36 episodes
2014	Law & Order: UK	Gabby	1 episode
2015	Josh	Holly	1 episode
2016–2018	Bob the Builder	Mei Moon (voice)	Recurring role, 7 episodes
2016	Stan Lee's Lucky Man	Lily-Anne Lau	Recurring role, 10 episodes
2016	Scott & Bailey	DC Anna Ram	3 episodes
2017–2018	Zapped	Scrape	Recurring role, 5 episodes
2018	The Romanoffs	Kiera Ming	1 episode
2019	Pure	Sef	3 episodes
2019	The Feed	Mayu Hatfield	Main role, 10 episodes
2020	Gangs of London	Victoria 'Vicky' Chung	Main role, 8 episodes
2022	Man vs. Bee	Nina Kolstad-Bergenbatten	4 episodes
2022	Pennyworth	Zahra Zhin	3 episodes
2024–present	Red Eye	DC Hana Li	Main role, 12 episodes
2026	Number 10 †		Upcoming series

Key
†	Denotes productions that have not yet been released
