= Elisabeth Strøm Henriksen =

Norwegian actress (1940–1985)

- Born: February 8, 1940; Oslo, Norway
- Died: May 13, 1984 (aged 44); Oslo, Norway
- Resting place: Vestre gravlund
- Occupations: Actress, puppeteer
- Children: Camilla Strøm Henriksen
- Parents: Julian Strøm (father); Selma Hanna Johnsgård (mother)
- Relatives: Birgit Strøm (sister)

Elisabeth Strøm Henriksen (February 8, 1940 – May 13, 1984) was a Norwegian puppeteer and actress.

== Career ==
=== Puppeteer ===
As early as 1953, Elisabeth Strøm Henriksen was active as a puppeteer. She was employed at the People's Theater (Folketeatret) puppet theater, which was headed by her father Julian Strøm. The performance Nils og Blåmann was the premiere of a play adaptation by Barthold Halle and Gunnar Olram of the comic strip of the same name by Ivar Mauritz-Hansen and Sigurd Winsnes. The work was actually written as a play for human actors, and it premiered on November 4, 1953. This was followed by a number of new puppet shows until 1967.

When the People's Theater and the New Theater (Det Nye Teater) merged to form the Oslo New Theater in 1959, puppet theater activity was continued as part of the new institution.

In addition to working as a puppeteer for theater, Strøm Henriksen also appeared in a series of broadcasts of Julian Strøms Dukketeater (Julian Strøm's Puppet Theater) for NRK children's television.

=== Stage actress ===
Strøm Henriksen also performed as an actress. Already as a child, she participated in children's theater performances at the People's Theater, where her father Julian Strøm and sister Birgit Strøm worked. As a fifteen-year-old, Elisabeth Strøm played one of the queen's chambermaids in the People's Theater's Christmas performance of Snehvit og de 7 dvergene (Snow White and the Seven Dwarfs) in 1955. The production was based on a script by Sverre Gran.

Strøm Henriksen had her formal debut as an actress in a performance of William Shakespeare's A Midsummer Night's Dream at Frogner Park in the summer of 1963. In a review for the newspaper Arbeiderbladet, Paul Gjesdahl wrote that "As the prankster Puck, Elisabeth Strøm made her debut on the stage. It was a fun and promising debut. In both her delivery and acting, she delivered a convincing portrayal of the world-famous mischievous jester."

Later, she played the role of one of the dairyman Tevye's daughters in the Norwegian Theater's production of Fiddler on the Roof in 1968. Lasse Kolstad played the main role as Tevye, and the production was one of the Norwegian Theater's biggest successes. After playing to full houses in Oslo, the performance went on tour around the country in collaboration with the National Traveling Theater.

=== Television ===
Strøm Henriksen also appeared in two NRK television theater productions: the play Bandet (Norwegian: Båndet 'The Bond', 1964), written by August Strindberg and directed by Magne Bleness, and Frydenberg (1965), written by Johan Borgen and directed by Barthold Halle.

== Family ==
Elisabeth Strøm Henriksen was the daughter of the actor and theater director Julian Strøm and the sister of the puppeteer Birgit Strøm. She was the mother of the actress and director Camilla Strøm Henriksen.
