= Camilla Strøm Henriksen =

Norwegian director, screenwriter and actress

- Born: 9 January 1968 (age 57); Oslo, Norway
- Occupations: Director, screenwriter, actress

Camilla Strøm Henriksen (born 9 January 1968) is a Norwegian director, screenwriter and actress. She is the daughter of the puppeteer and actress Elisabeth Strøm Henriksen.

== Career ==
Strøm Henriksen started out as an actress, working in theatre, TV and films. She has previously both won and been nominated for the Amanda Award, the main Norwegian film award. For her debut in A Handful of Time she also won the Best Actress Rouen Nordic Film Festival.

She decided to move into writing and directing and studied at the London Film School, she graduated in 2004 with an MA in directing.

== Filmography ==
=== Director ===
==== TV series ====
- Hotel Cæsar - 2005-2014, TV series
- Hvaler - 2010
- Red Eye (British TV series) - 3 episodes, 2026

=== Writer-Director ===
- Phoenix (Føniks) - 2018

==== Shorts ====
- Lace - 2003
- Night Call - 2004
