= Tymika Tafari =

Canadian actress (born 1995)

Tymika Tafari (born May 4, 1995) is a Jamaican Canadian actress from Toronto, Ontario. She is most noted for her roles in the television series Slip, for which she and the rest of the core cast were nominated for Best Ensemble Performance in a Comedy Series at the 12th Canadian Screen Awards in 2024, and the web series Settle Down, for which she was a nominee for Best Supporting Performance in a Web Series at the 14th Canadian Screen Awards in 2026.

Her other roles have included the films The Marijuana Conspiracy, Dinner with Friends and Son of Sara: Volume 1, the web series Chateau Laurier and Revenge of the Black Best Friend, and voice roles in My Little Pony: Make Your Mark, Gary and His Demons, Total Drama Island, PAW Patrol and Work It Out Wombats!.
