= Haley Bishop =

UK-based American actress

- Education: San Diego State University (bachelor's degree); Royal Central School of Speech and Drama (master's degree)
- Occupations: Actress; filmmaker
- Years active: 2009–present

Haley Bishop is an American actress and filmmaker.

== Early life ==
Bishop's parents were musicians, and she performed in musicals. After first thinking she might become a singer, her interests changed when she began to study theatre in college. In 2010, she graduated from San Diego State University with a bachelor's degree in theatre and performance. She then earned a master's degree from the Royal Central School of Speech and Drama in London, where she has lived since.

== Career ==
Bishop is best known for her roles in the horror short film Dawn of the Deaf (2016), the political thriller film Angel Has Fallen (2019), and the horror film Host (2020). Host, a screenlife film taking place on a Zoom call during the COVID-19 pandemic, was one of the year's most acclaimed films.

== Filmography ==
=== Film ===
Year	Title	Role	Notes
2009	Overdue	Jen	
2016	Glow	Anna	Short film Also writer and producer
2016	Hello Goodbye	Sarah	Short film
2016	Fan Girl		Short film Production manager
2016	We'll Meet Again	Irene	Short film
2016	Dawn of the Deaf	Nat	Short film
2017	Things We Never Say	Lucy	Short film Also writer and producer
2017	Into the Snow - Sundance Experiment	Harriet	Short film
2019	Angel Has Fallen	Main Aide	
2020	Multiplex	Nat	Short film
2020	Host	Haley	
2021	Tom & Jerry	Person in Park	
2020	1-800-D-DIRECT	Joyce	Short film Also writer and producer
2022	SINPHONY: A Clubhouse Horror Anthology	Lauren	Short film Also writer, director, and producer

=== Television ===
Year	Title	Role	Notes
2017	Doctors	Mindy Samdup Rinpoche	Episode: "New Leaf"
2018	Deep State	Meredith	Episode: "Blood in the Sand"

=== Web ===
Year	Title	Role	Notes
2020	Popternative	Herself	Episode: "Haley Bishop"
2021	The Kill Count	Herself	Episode: "Host (2020) KILL COUNT"
