= Jai Varma =

Indian actor

- Other names: Jayaram (in Telugu), Jayavarma, Jaya Varman
- Occupation: Actor
- Years active: 1999-2008; 2019-present
- Parent: C. L. Anandan
- Relatives: Disco Shanti (sister); Lalitha Kumari (sister)

Jai Varma (or Jayavarma) is an Indian actor who works in Tamil and Telugu films. He is credited as Jayaram in Telugu films.

== Personal life and career ==
Jai Varma is the son of C. L. Anandan and brother of Disco Shanti and Lalitha Kumari. In his debut with the Telugu film Sambayya (1999), followed by Ide Naa Modati Premalekha (2001), he was credited as Jayaram. Both films feature his brother-in-law Srihari. Regarding his performance in the latter film, Gudipoodi Srihari of The Hindu wrote that he "displays ease in drama and dance". He made his Tamil debut with Naam (2003), which featured his then brother-in-law Prakash Raj (through Lalitha Kumari) and four other newcomers. Regarding his performance, a critic from The Hindu wrote that "Jayavarma, with a robust physique, piercing eyes and convincing expressions, is impressive" and added that "But there is an underlying sincerity about the role, in which Jayavarma shows promise". During the shooting of his next film Image (2004), he slipped and fell when trying to save Abhinayashree and was saved by the director and producer. Regarding his performance, a critic wrote that he "acquits himself creditably here too, despite the script not aiding him in any way". He played the antagonist in Seshadri Naidu starring his brother-in-law Srihari and produced by Disco Shanthi. A critic from Idlebrain.com wrote that "Being short and slim, he did not look competitive enough to face Srihari's screen presence". Theekuchi, which had a delayed release, released to negative reviews with a critic noting that "Hero Jaivarma has struggled to carry the burden and it shows".

== Filmography ==
- Note: all films are in Tamil, unless otherwise noted.

Year	Film	Role	Language	Notes
1999	Sambayya		Telugu	
2001	Ide Naa Modati Premalekha		Telugu	
2003	Indiramma		Telugu	
2003	Naam	Ramesh	Tamil	
2004	Image	Satish	Tamil	
2004	Seshadri Naidu	MLA's son	Telugu	
2004	Azhagiya Theeye	Moorthy	Tamil	
2005	Oru Kalluriyin Kathai	Moorthy	Tamil	
2008	Theekuchi	Sakthi	Tamil	
2019	Laabam	Pakkiri's friend	Tamil	
2022	Vikram	Sandhanam's family member	Tamil	
