= Theekuchi =

- Poster
- Directed by: A. L. Raja
- Written by: A. L. Raja
- Produced by: G. A. Lucas
- Starring: Jai Varma; Mythriya
- Cinematography: S. R. Sathish Kumar
- Edited by: V. M. Uthayasankar
- Music by: Srikanth Deva
- Production company: Star Movie Makers
- Release date: 14 March 2008
- Country: India
- Language: Tamil

Theekuchi (transl. Matchstick) is a 2008 Indian Tamil-language action film directed by A. L. Raja. The film stars Jai Varma and newcomer Mythriya, while Vadivelu and Ashish Vidyarthi play supporting roles. The music was composed by Srikanth Deva. The film was released on 14 March 2008. The film was dubbed into Telugu language as Aggiravva with additional scenes featuring Vinutha Lal and Brahmanandam, and it was released in 2014.

== Plot ==
Sakthi (Jaivarma) is on a mission to take revenge on those who usurped government land and killed his mother (Bhanupriya), who wanted to construct a school there. Instead, a local illicit arrack seller and rowdy named Pasupathy Pandian (Ashish Vidyarthi), with the help of the Education Minister Kanthasamy (Kadhal Dhandapani), builds a self-financing private engineering college and strikes gold. Pasupathy becomes rich and powerful by giving admissions by getting capitation fees. The poor students who do not pay up either commit suicide or disappear. Sakthi and his friends, including the heroine (Mythriya), Pasupathy's daughter, fight back against the injustice and nefarious activities going on in the campus. How they ultimately triumph and justice prevails is what the movie is about.

== Cast ==
- Jaivarma as Sakthi
- Mythriya
- Vadivelu as Kuravan
- Ashish Vidyarthi as Pasupathy Pandian
- Kadhal Dhandapani as Kanthasamy, Education Minister
- Manivannan
- Bhanupriya as Sakthi's mother
- Vinu Chakravarthy as Periyasamy
- Cochin Haneefa as Madhanagopal, college principal
- Suman Setty as Sakthi's friend
- Thambi Ramaiah as Kurangu Ramasamy
- Rajeev as Inspector Sankarapandian
- Poovilangu Mohan
- Pandi as Kuravan's son
- Karate Raja
- Mahanadhi Shankar
- S. S. Rajendran
- Vasu Vikram
- Singamuthu
- Vaiyapuri as Vishwa, Sakthi's supporter
- Balu Anand
- Theni Kunjarammal
- Benjamin
- S. Rajasekar
- Crane Manohar as Panchangam
- Shobha
- Kalidas

== Production ==
Theekuchi is produced by G. A. Lucas for Star Movie Makers. A. L. Rajan, who earlier directed Parthiban starrer Ninaikkatha Naalillai, was selected as director. Jai Varma, brother of Disco Shanti and who earlier appeared in Azhagiya Theeye, was selected to play the lead role. It was also the last film for S. S. Rajendran as an actor, before his death in 2014.

The film was launched in 2005 and the shooting was commenced at locations in Madurai, Tirupparakundram, Kodaikanal, Nagercoil, and Kanyakumari among other places. The film faced controversy when actresses from Kerala complained that producer did not pay salary for them. The filming was finished in 2006 and was finalised to release in 2007 but failed to meet deadline and it had a low key release in 2008.

== Soundtrack ==
The music was composed by Srikanth Deva, while lyrics were written by P. Vijay, Snehan, Nandalala, Vijay Sagar, and Jayaravi.

- Thee Thee Theekuchi - Shankar Mahadevan
- Iyra Meenu - Tippu
- Kadhalane - Karthik, Sadhana Sargam
- Sogam Than - Deva

== Reception ==
Sify wrote, "A film with newcomers should be encouraged, but Theekuchi makes you grimace as it is a ‘masala’ barbecue of the state of self finance ‘private’ colleges in the state. To call this film an amateurish attempt would be an understatement". Chennai Online wrote "Overall a mediocre presentation and a dull star cast mars the flow and curbs the viewer's interest".
