= Naam (2003 film) =

- DVD cover
- Directed by: Sabapathy Dekshinamurthy
- Screenplay by: Sabapathy Dekshinamurthy
- Story by: Chandra Sekhar Yeleti
- Produced by: Prakash Raj
- Starring: Jayavarma; Rashmi Murali; Prakash Raj; Sundar; Mukesh; Vinod
- Cinematography: M. V. Panneerselvam
- Music by: Kalyani Malik
- Production company: Duet Movies
- Release date: 19 September 2003
- Country: India
- Language: Tamil

Naam (transl. We) is a 2003 Indian Tamil language crime thriller film directed by Sabapathy Dekshinamurthy. The film is produced Prakash Raj, who himself starred in an antagonistic role, while an ensemble cast of newcomers including Jayavarma, Rashmi Murali, Sundar, Mukesh and Vinod formed primary roles. The film was released on 19 September 2003. It is a remake of Telugu film Aithe.

== Cast ==
- Prakash Raj as Irfan Khan
- Kalabhavan Mani as a police officer
- Laxmi Ratan
- Jayavarma as Ramesh
- Rashmi Murali as Gayatri
- Sundar as Sethu
- Mukesh as Kutty
- Vinod as Sharath
- Pyramid Natarajan as Selvendran
- Ilavarasu
- Mahanadhi Shankar
- Raviraj as Kutty's father
- Jaya Murali as Kutty's mother
- Suseenthiran as guy at tea shop (uncredited)

== Production ==
The film featured five newcomers including Jayavarma (Disco Shanti's brother) and Rashmi Murali (daughter of Jaya Murali). The film was launched on 6 July 2003.

== Soundtrack ==
Soundtrack had only one song composed by Kalyani Malik who composed the original film.

- Kanavugal – Maragathamani

== Reception ==
Malathi Rangarajan of The Hindu wrote, "Prakashraj and Saba Kailash can be proud of their offering that sends across a positive message to the youth." Sify wrote, "The cinematography looks good and debutant Kalyani Mallick's music is average. On the whole, director Sabha Kailash has handled this action packed film well". Malini Mannath of Chennai Online noted that "A thriller, it's worth a watch, for it's [sic] novel script and treatment, the twist in the story, and the freshness of the lead players".
