= Achamillai Gopi =

Indian actor

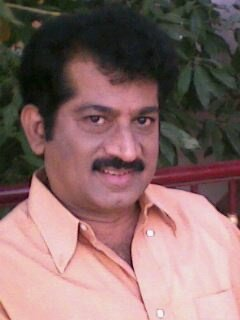
- Born: V. Gopalakrishnan; 9 May 1955
- Other name: Jayagopi
- Occupations: Film actor, Singer, dramatist, Voice Over & Dubbing
- Years active: 1975–present
- Spouse: Shobana
- Children: 2

Gopalakrishnan (born 9 May 1955), known professionally as Achamillai Gopi, is an Indian actor, singer, dramatist, and a voice over & dubbing artist. He has acted in a number of films and TV serials and has also given his voice for various cine actors in Tamil. He is a singer, owns a band called "Gopi melodies" for more than 30 years, and has been consistently performing live shows.

He has acted in several films in Tamil and has done over 1,000 telefilms and serials.

== Early life and family ==
Born in Thanjavur, Tamil Nadu his parents, Mr. M. Venkatraman, a retired Railway officer, and Ms. Meenakshi, named him V. Gopalakrishnan (fondly called 'Achamillai Gopi' today).

== Career ==
He was trained under the tutelage of guru Shrimaan Kumbakonam Nataraj Iyer, and after a while, started his music troop 'Gopi Krishna' in 1970, facilitating his stage career and passion. Very soon he got the opportunity to do backing vocals for Ilaiyaraaja and sung many songs for composers like Ravindran, Narasimhan and V. Kumar. Directors Mr. K. Balachander and Mr. Ananthu, screenplay writers Mr. G. Balasubramanian and Mr. Gokulnath, were all working in the AG's office then. He also participated in singing competitions and dramatics.

In the film Poikkalkuthirai, one of K. Balachander directorial ventures, Mr. Ravindran played an interesting character that required dialogues to be voiced in a unique manner. Gopi was given the opportunity to dub for this role. His first onscreen debut was offered by K. Balachander, the man who had also given him his first dubbing project. He was to play a role alongside none other than Mr. Rajinikanth in Thillu Mullu, a Balachander film.

== Filmography ==
=== As actor ===
Films

Year	Film	Role	Notes
1981	Thillu Mullu		
1984	Achamillai Achamillai	Palavesam	
1985	Thavam		
1985	Padikkadha Pannaiyar	Pannaiyar's son	
1985	Oru Pullankuzhal Adupputhukirathu		
1986	Marakka Maaten		
1987	Velaikkaran	Kowsalya's brother	
1987	Pudhiavan		
1987	Ivargal Indiyargal		
1988	Oorai Therinjikitten		
1988	Nallavan		
1988	Paarthal Pasu		
1988	Kai Koduppal Karpagambal		
1988	Kaalaiyum Neeye Maalaiyum Neeye		
1989	Athaimadi Methaiadi		
1989	Aavathellam Pennale		
1990	Vedikkai En Vadikkai		
1990	Varavu Nalla Uravu		
1990	Panakkaran		
1990	Pathimoonam Number Veedu	Muthu	
1990	Athisaya Piravi		
1991	Idhaya Vaasal	Murali	
1991	Marupakkam		
1991	Vaaku Moolam		
1993	Iniyaraja		
2003	Punnagai Poove		
2006	Vanjagan	Lawyer	
2007	Nee Naan Nila	Nila's father	

Television

- Akshaya
- Enge Brahmanan
- Vanna Kolangal
- Mangalyam
- Take it Easy Vazhkai
- Dheerga Sumangali
- Sorgam
- Kanavugal Aayiram
- Aarthi
- Kasthuri
- Kalyanee – Gemini TV
- Vairanenjam (dubbed as Aadajanma on Star Maa and Swarna Manasu on Asianet)
- Anandham vilaiyadum veedu
- Vasantham
- Kodi Mullai

=== Dubbing artist ===
Films

Actor	Film	Notes
Raveendran	Poikkal Kudhirai (1983)	
Vishnuvardhan	Eetti (1985)	
Ramkumar	Government Mappillai (1992)	
Vinod Kumar Alva	Bharata Ratna	Tamil dubbed version
Shihan Hussaini	My India	
Balakrishna	Surya (1993)	
Devan	Rishi (2001)	
Govinda	Rakkamma Kaiya Thattu (1989)	
Rahman	Puriyatha Puthir (1990), Aarathi Edungadi (1990), Pattikattan (1990); Pattanamdhan Pokalamadi (1990); Seetha (1990); Thambi Pondatti (1992), Mappillai Vandhachu (1992), Naane Varuven (1992); Udan Pirappu (1993), Karuppu Vellai (1993); Hero (1994); Paattu Padava (1995), Kalki (1996); Ninaikkatha Naalillai (2001)	
Kumaresh	Oru Veedu Iru Vaasal (1990)	
Vijayaraghavan	Arangetra Velai (1990)	
Venkatesh	Vaaliban (1990), Coolie No. 1 (1991), Mudhalamaichar Jayanthi (1991), Super Police (1994); Enga Oor Singam (1996), College Galatta (1997)	
Arun Pandian	Adhikari (1991)	
Pramod	Jenma Natchathram (1991)	
Murali	Pudhiya Natchathiram (1991)	
Jagadeesh	Kasthuri Manjal (1992)	
Nagarjuna	Eswar (1992); Autokaaran (1998); Sathriya Dharmam (1999); Pongada Neengalum Unga Arasiyalum	
Raja	Kizhakku Veluthachu (1992)	
Rajaprabhu	Chinna Poovai Killathey (1992)	
Anand	Naan Pesa Ninaipathellam (1993)	
Jagapathi Babu	Pokkiri Kadhalan (1994)	
Suresh Gopi	Mr. Deva (1995), The King (1995); Narasimha Naicker (2001)	
Devaraj	Circle Inspector (1996)	Tamil dubbed version
Anupam Kher	VIP (1997)	
Arjun	Arjuna (1998)	
Manoj K. Jayan	Game (2002)	
Naseeruddin Shah	Krrish (2006)	Tamil dubbed version
Charan Raj	Vel (2007)	
Shobraj	Lady Tiger (2010)	
Sayaji Shinde	Sudesi (2006)	
Nassar	Ini Oru Vidhi Seivom (2014)	

Television

Actor	Character	Serial	Notes
Raviraj	Doctor	Micro Thodar – Manjal Nila	
Subhalekha Sudhakar		Chithi, Kolangal, Thendral; Madhavi; Ilavarasi; Priyamanaval; Thenmozhiyaal	
Sridhar	Sahana's father	Sahana	
Srinath		Thyagam	
