= Aishwariyaa Bhaskaran =

Indian actress

- Born: Shanta Meena; 27 May 1971 (age 55); Chennai, Tamil Nadu, India
- Occupation: Actor
- Years active: 1989–1995; 1999–present
- Spouse: Tanveer Ahmed (m. 1994; div. 1996)
- Children: 1
- Parents: Bhaskaran; Lakshmi
- Relatives: Y. V. Rao (grandfather); Kumari Rukmani (grandmother); Nungambakkam Janaki(great grandmother)

Shanta Meena, known professionally as Aishwariyaa Bhaskaran, is an Indian actress who has acted in Tamil, Malayalam, Kannada, Telugu and Hindi movies and along with several Malayalam and Tamil television soap operas. She is the eldest daughter of actress Lakshmi and Bhaskaran.

== Career ==
Aishwariyaa debuted as heroine through the 1989 Kannada movie Hosa Kavya. Her first Malayalam film was Oliyampukal (1991), followed by Mamagaru (1991), Rasukutty (1992) and Meera (1992). She played a double role in Butterflies (1993) and also made her Hindi debut in Gardish (1993), which was a remake of the Malayalam movie Kireedam. Early in her career, she turned down opportunity to work with Mani Ratnam in Thiruda Thiruda (1993).

Following her marriage in 1994, Aishwariyaa quit the film industry and chose to prioritise bringing up a family. However her marriage fell apart and she became addicted to drugs as a result of her husband's addiction, which made it difficult for her to re-enter the film industry after her divorce in 1996. After undergoing a rehabilitation process, she chose to continue her education in computer science and joined to work with the NIIT in 1997 and prioritised her work as a software engineer. She then accepted an offer to be a part of a television show produced by Suresh Chandra Menon, after being convinced by her friend, actress Revathi. After a four-year sabbatical from films as a result of her marriage, childbirth and divorce, Aishwariyaa made a comeback in R. Parthiban's House Full (1999) portraying an inspector-in-charge of the bomb disposal squad. She continued to portray supporting roles in films such as Suyamvaram (1999), Sathyameva Jayathe (2000) and Narasimham (2000) during the turn of the century.

== Personal life ==
Aishwariyaa was born as Shanta Meena to Bhaskaran and actress Lakshmi. She has a stepsister (Samyuktha) from her mother's third marriage with Sivachandran.

She was married to Tanveer Ahmed in 1994 and later divorced him in 1996. The couple have a daughter born in 1995.

== Filmography ==
As actress

Key
†	Denotes films that have not yet been released

Year	Film	Role	Language	Notes
1989	Hosa Kavya	Usha	Kannada	Debut movie
1989	Adavilo Abhimanyudu	Shanti	Telugu	Telugu debut
1990	Oliyampukal	Kunjumol	Malayalam	Malayalam debut
1990	Prema Zindabad	Bharathi	Telugu	
1990	Nyayangal Jayikkattum	Saraswati's daughter	Tamil	Tamil debut
1991	Mill Thozhilali	Geetha	Tamil	
1991	Thaiyalkaran	Kaveri	Tamil	
1991	Marikozhundhu	Marikozhundhu, Chithra	Tamil	
1991	Naan Pudicha Mappillai	Rasathi	Tamil	
1991	Mamagaru	Rani	Telugu	
1991	Oorellam Un Pattu	Shanthi	Tamil	
1991	Ponnukku Sethi Vandhachu	Uma	Tamil	
1991	Anbulla Thangachikku		Tamil	
1992	Rasukutty	Rukmani	Tamil	
1992	Meera	Meera	Tamil	
1992	Subba Rayudi Pelli	Lalitha	Telugu	
1992	Ahankari	Neeli/Neelu	Telugu	
1992	Pellante Noorella Panta	Roja	Telugu	
1992	Seetapathi Chalo Tirupathi		Telugu	
1992	Brahma	Saraswathi	Telugu	
1992	Kizhaku Veluthachu	Meenakshi	Tamil	
1993	Poranthaalum Aambalayaa Porakkakoodaathu	Meenatchi	Tamil	
1993	Jackpot	Sindhu Gautham Krishna	Malayalam	
1993	Butterflies	Anju Nambyar, Manju Nambyar	Malayalam	
1993	Gardish	Vidya P. Bhalla	Hindi	Hindi debut
1993	Thanga Pappa	Gowri	Tamil	
1993	Ulle Veliye	Meena	Tamil	
1993	Yajaman	Ponni	Tamil	
1995	Makkal Aatchi	Manjula	Tamil	
1999	House Full	Christine	Tamil	
1999	Suyamvaram	Savithri	Tamil	
2000	Pennin Manathai Thottu	Sunitha's sister	Tamil	
2000	Narashimham	Anuradha	Malayalam	
2000	Sathyameva Jayathe	Nancy	Malayalam	
2001	Kasi	Radhika	Tamil	
2001	Sharja To Sharja	Kalyani	Malayalam	
2001	Praja	Maya Mary Kurien	Malayalam	
2001	Jollyman	Aish	Tamil	
2002	Panchatanthiram	Janaki	Tamil	
2003	The King Maker Leader	Vasanthy Nambiar	Malayalam	
2003	Amma Nanna O Tamila Ammayi	Pinni(step mother)	Telugu	
2003	The Fire	Neena Cheriyan	Malayalam	
2004	Agninakshathram	Aswathi Warrier	Malayalam	
2004	M. Kumaran Son of Mahalakshmi	Shalini	Tamil	
2004	New	Seema	Tamil	
2004	Naani	Priya's friend	Telugu	
2004	Jana		Tamil	
2004	Kuthu	Meenakshi	Tamil	
2005	Dhairyam	Mallika's Mother	Telugu	
2005	Priyasakhi	Priya's Mother	Tamil	
2005	Aaru	Sound Saroja Akka	Tamil	
2005	Englishkaran	Padma	Tamil	
2006	Notebook	Elizabeth	Malayalam	
2006	Thanthra	Vedavadhi	Malayalam	
2006	Manasu Palike Mouna Raagam	Ranii	Telugu	
2006	Paramasivan	Malar's stepmother	Tamil	
2006	Pandavaru	Nagamani	Kannada	
2006	Paisalo Paramatma		Telugu	
2007	Inspector Garud	Maya Gopinath	Malayalam	
2007	Sringaram: Dance of Love	Mirasu's wife	Tamil	
2007	Vel	Sakkara Pandi's Wife	Tamil	
2007	Sabari	Vajravelu's Wife	Tamil	
2007	Sri Mahalakshmi	Advocate	Telugu	
2008	Pazhani	Durga	Tamil	
2008	Abhiyum Naanum	Anuradha (Abhi's mother)	Tamil	
2009	Adada Enna Azhagu	Diana	Tamil	
2010	Abhishapt	Nurse	Hindi	
2010	Jhummandi Naadam	Ardhangi	Telugu	
2010	Buridi		Telugu	
2011	Manushya Mrugam	Mary	Malayalam	
2012	Madirasi	Ragini	Malayalam	
2012	Theni Maavattam	Eeswari	Tamil	
2012	Uchithanai Muharnthaal	Security Guard	Tamil	
2012	Uu Kodathara? Ulikki Padathara?	Amrutha Valli's mother	Telugu	
2013	For Sale	Achamma	Malayalam	
2013	Natholi Oru Cheriya Meenalla	Lakshmi/Sainuthatha	Malayalam	
2013	Maad Dad	Sosamma	Malayalam	
2013	Philips and the Monkey Pen	Uncredited; Archive footage	Malayalam	From Narasimham
2014	Poojai	Mrs. Sivakkozhnthu	Tamil	
2014	Un Samayal Arayil / Oggarane / Ulavucharu Biriyani	Asha	Tamil / Kannada / Telugu	
2015	Aambala	Nadu Ponnu	Tamil	
2015	MGR Sivaji Rajini Kamal	Aishwarya	Tamil	
2015	Savaale Samaali	Special appearance	Tamil	in song sequence
2015	Bhale Manchi Roju	Shakti's wife	Telugu	
2016	Kadavul Irukaan Kumaru	Manimaaran's wife	Tamil	
2016	Kalyana Vaibhogame	Nagamani	Telugu	
2017	Kuttram 23		Tamil	
2017	Ticket	Sona	Tamil	
2018	Devadas	Fishfry Lakshmi	Telugu	
2018	Saamy 2	Shanthi	Tamil	
2019	Oh! Baby	Vikram's Mother	Telugu	
2021	Ichata Vahanamulu Niluparadu	Arun's mother	Telugu	
2022	Yaanai	Selvi's mother	Tamil	
2023	Dada	Manikandan's mother	Tamil	
2024	Rajakili	Thamaraiselvi IAS	Tamil	
2025	9AM To 9PM Valentines Day		Tamil	
2025	Kannappa	Maremma	Telugu	
2026	Mrithyunjay	Jay's aunt	Telugu	
2026	Leader	Meera's mother	Tamil	

As dubbing artist

List of Rohini film credits as dubbing artist
Year	Film	Actress	Language	Other notes
2000	Hey Ram	Rani Mukerji	Telugu	Dubbed Version

== Television ==
=== Serials ===
Year	Serial	Role	Channel	Language	Notes
1997	Naniyar		Vijay TV	Tamil	
1998	Janani		Jaya TV	Tamil	
1999	Nizhalgal		Sun TV	Tamil	
2000	Devatha		Asianet	Malayalam	
2001	Theadathey Thulainthu Povai	Stella	Raj TV	Tamil	
2002	Kathiravan	Senchulakshmi	Sun TV	Tamil	
2003	Olangal	Aishwarya	Asianet	Malayalam	
2004	Mizhi Thurakkumbol	Varada	Surya TV	Malayalam	
2004–2005	Kadamattath Kathanaar	Thirumala/Yakshi	Asianet	Malayalam	
2004–2006	Muhurtham	Aishwarya	Sun TV	Tamil	
2005–2006	Raja Rajeswari	Padmalakshmi	Sun TV	Tamil	
2005	Kavyaanjali		Surya TV	Malayalam	
2005	Mandrake		Asianet	Malayalam	
2006	Sathyam	Ancy	Kairali TV	Malayalam	
2006–2007	Swami Ayyappan	Mahishi	Asianet	Malayalam	
2008–2011	Paarijatham	Lalitha Bhai	Asianet	Malayalam	
2009	Kadhaparayum Kavyaanjali		Surya TV	Malayalam	
2010–2012	Thendral	Bhuvaneswari a.k.a. Bhuvana	Sun TV	Tamil	Replaced by Sudha Chandran
2011	Nagamma	Amman	Raj TV	Tamil	
2013–2014	Mama Mapillai	Aishwarya	Sun TV	Tamil	
2013	Manathil Uruthi Vendum		Jaya TV	Tamil	
2013–2014	Kurinji Malar	Kalpana	Kalaignar TV	Tamil	
2015–2016	4 the People	Prof. Vasundara Das	Asianet	Malayalam	
2015–2017	Nandini vs Nandini	Baby	ETV Plus	Telugu	
2017–2019	Azhagu	Vasantha	Sun TV	Tamil	
2018–2020	Chembarathi	Thrichambarath Akhilandeswari	Zee Keralam	Malayalam	Replaced by Thara Kalyan
2021	Jothi	Sambhavi	Sun TV	Tamil	Photo Presence
2021	Ninaithale Inikkum		Zee Tamil	Tamil	Cameo appearance
2022–2023	Jamelaa	Saleema	Colors Tamil	Tamil	
2023 – present	Sukhamo Devi	Chandroth Prabhavathi Sidharthan	Flowers TV	Malayalam	
2024 – 2025	Panchagni	Prabhavathi	Flowers TV	Malayalam	Extended Cameo Appearance

=== Shows ===
Year	Show	Role	Channel	Language	Notes
2003	Anthakshari	Host	Raj TV	Tamil	
2005	Sakalakala Velloori	Judge	Jaya TV	Tamil	
2010	Rani Maharani	Participant	Surya TV	Malayalam	
2017	Comedy Super Night 2	Herself	Flowers TV	Malayalam	
2019	Comedy Stars	Judge	Asianet	Malayalam	
2021	Start Music	Contestant	Star Vijay	Tamil	
2021	Comedy Raja Kalakkal Rani	Judge	Star Vijay	Tamil	
2021	Alitho Saradaga	Guest	ETV Plus	Telugu	
2022	Joker Poker	Participant	Zee Tamil	Tamil	
2022	Oru Kodi	Contestant	Flowers TV	Malayalam	
2022	Vanakkam Tamizha	Guest	Sun TV	Tamil	

=== Web series ===
Year	Serial	Role	Channel	Language
2017	Mana Mugguri Love Story	Swathi 's mother	YuppTV	Telugu
2018	Gangstars	Priyamvadha	Amazon Prime Video	Telugu
2020	Dear u brother u	Amma	YouTube	Tamil
