= Pattina Pravesam =

1977 film by K. Balachander

- Theatrical release poster
- Directed by: K. Balachander
- Screenplay by: K. Balachander
- Based on: Pattina Pravesam (play) by Visu
- Produced by: R. Venkataraman
- Starring: Delhi Ganesh; Jai Ganesh; Sivachandran; Sarath Babu
- Music by: M. S. Viswanathan
- Production company: Premalaya Films
- Release date: 9 September 1977
- Running time: 126–146 minutes (Note: While the runtime is given as 146 minutes in the 1978 book Indian Films, it is given as 126 minutes at the Complete Index to World Film.)
- Country: India
- Language: Tamil

Pattina Pravesam (/pəttinəˈprəveɪsəm/ transl. Entering a City) is a 1977 Indian Tamil-language drama film written and directed by K. Balachander. It is based on the play of the same name, written by Visu and staged the same year. The film stars Delhi Ganesh, Sivachandran and Sarath Babu, all making their cinematic acting debuts. It was released on 9 September 1977. The plot's similarities to the 1964 film Birds of Exile (Gurbet Kuslari in Turkish) have been noted.

== Plot ==
A widow, and her four sons and a daughter, who live in a villages, are lured into living in a city. Each member goes through their own troubles in adjusting. Being completely disillusioned with city life, the family returns to their village.

== Cast ==
- Delhi Ganesh as Murugan
- Jai Ganesh as Saravanan
- Sivachandran as Kumaran
- Kathadi Ramamurthy as Innocent Dhandapani
- Sarath Babu
- Meera
- Swarna

== Production ==
Pattina Pravesam was written and directed by K. Balachander, and based on the play of the same name which was written by Visu and staged in 1977, by Stage Creations. The film adaptation was produced by R. Venkataraman under Premalaya Films, and marked the cinematic acting debuts of Delhi Ganesh, Sivachandran and Sarath Babu. S. V. Subbaiah was originally cast in the role Ganesh portrayed in the play, but Ganesh ultimately reprised his role. Kathadi Ramamurthy, who played a character named "Innocent Dhandapani" in the play, also reprised his role in the film.

== Soundtrack ==
The soundtrack was composed by M. S. Viswanathan and the lyrics were written by Kannadasan. The song "Vaan Nila" was well received and attained cult status.

Track listing
No.	Title	Singer(s)	Length
1.	"Dharmathin Kannaikkatti"	M. S. Viswanathan	5:02
2.	"Thanthanaane"	M. S. Viswanathan	1:21
3.	"Vaan Nila Nila"	S. P. Balasubrahmanyam	5:48
4.	"Vaan Nila Nila" (Pathos)	L. R. Anjali	1:05
5.	"Vaangadi Chittukkala"	L. R. Eswari	3:25
Total length:			19:49

== Release and reception ==
Pattina Pravesam was released on 9 September 1977. The magazine Ananda Vikatan gave the film a rating of 52 out of 100. Naagai Dharuman of Anna praised the performances of the cast, dialogues, direction and cinematography. It was later selected for screening at the Tashkent Film Festival.
