= Nee..Naan..Nila.. =

- Poster
- Directed by: M. P. S. Sivakumar
- Written by: M. P. S. Sivakumar; M. Chandru (dialogues)
- Produced by: R. Viswanathan
- Starring: R. V. Bharathan; London Ravi; Meghna
- Cinematography: R. K. Rajarathinam; S. R. Sathish Kumar
- Edited by: Anil Mulnad
- Music by: Dhina
- Production company: Bharathan Films
- Release date: 25 May 2007
- Running time: 140 minutes
- Country: India
- Language: Tamil

Nee..Naan..Nila.. (transl. You, me and Nila) is a 2007 Indian Tamil-language romantic fantasy film directed by M. P. S. Sivakumar. The film stars newcomers R. V. Bharathan, London Ravi, and Meghna, with Manivannan, Karunas, Achamillai Gopi, Sangeetha Balan, Manobala, Appukutty, Balu Anand, and Vennira Aadai Moorthy playing supporting roles. The film, produced by R. Viswanathan, was released on 25 May 2007.

== Plot ==
Raja (London Ravi) and Vinoth (R. V. Bharathan) hate each other after they got into a fight during a cricket match. They are now college students studying in the same class. Vinoth is a person with a rough personality but is also a talented drawer, whereas Raja is a soft and simple person. They both fall under the spell of their classmate Nila (Meghna) and befriend her. Raja changes his clothing habits and his character and even stops playing cricket for her. During a college trip to Kodaikanal, Raja takes care of the sick Nila and spends much time with her. One day, Vinoth reveals his love to Nila, but she chooses Raja as her lover. Vinoth then becomes a drunkard.

After a serious bike accident, Nila is admitted to the hospital. Raja discovers he is now a ghost and died in the bike accident. Afterwards, Raja meets Chellappa (Manivannan), another ghost, who reveals to him that a ghost can be seen and can interact with a human only if the ghost wants. The loss of her lover makes Nila sad and depressive. She attempts to hang herself, but her family saves her in time. Raja, therefore, visits Vinoth's house and finds paintings of Nila in his room, so he decides to help Vinoth conquer Nila's heart. When Raja meets Vinoth on multiple occasions, Vinoth, afraid of him, ran away from him. One day, Raja tells Vinoth that he wants to help him and gives him good advice to woo Nila. After unsuccessful attempts to woo her, Vinoth completely changes his character and spends time with Nila. Vinoth then makes a marriage proposal to Nila, but she refuses to marry him. Nila considered Vinoth as a friend who wants to make her happy. She also said that she has no feelings for him and he behaves exactly like her deceased boyfriend Raja. Consumed with anger, Vinoth reveals to her that Raja is now a ghost and helped him woo her. Raja appears to Nila's eyes. He tries to convince her to move on and to marry Vinoth, but she categorically refused. Vinoth pushed Nila onto the railway tracks, and she died after being hit by a train. Vinoth explains to Nila, now a ghost, that he wanted her to be happy and that she can now be with her lover. The film ends with Raja and Nila walking hand in hand.

== Cast ==
- R. V. Bharathan as Vinoth
- London Ravi as Raja
- Meghna as Nila
- Manivannan as Chellappa
- Karunas as Mokkasamy
- Achamillai Gopi as Nila's father
- Sangeetha Balan as Nila's mother
- Manobala as Professor
- Appukutty as Student
- Balu Anand as Ulundurpet Uthamarasu
- Vennira Aadai Moorthy
- Bayilvan Ranganathan as Cricket Umpire
- Tirupur Ramaswamy as Ghost
- Cool Suresh as Harish
- Bhavya Krishnan
- Muthukaalai
- Kallukkul Eeram Ramanathan
- Ragasya as an item number
- Abhinayashree as an item number

== Production ==
R. Viswanathan produced the film under the banner Bharathan Films, with M. P. S. Sivakumar making his directorial debut. London Ravi and R. Viswanathan's son R. V. Bharathan were cast as the heroes of the film and Miss Gujarat Meghna was chosen to play the female lead role. Manivannan signed to play an important role. Karunas, Manobala, Vennira Aadai Moorthy and Muthukalai were selected to play comedy roles. Dhina composed the musical score of the film and actor Silambarasan has rendered his voice for a Kuthu song. The climax scenes were shot at the same train accident spot that figured in Kamal Haasan's Anbe Sivam (2003). A train was hired for three days for the shooting.

== Soundtrack ==
The film score and the soundtrack were composed by Dhina. Saraswathy Srinivas of Rediff.com gave the album 2.5 out of 5 stars and concluded, "All in all, an okay album".

Song	Singer(s)	Lyrics	Duration
"Darling O Darling"	Gayathri	Na. Muthukumar	1:43
"En Kadhal Deiva"	Vijay Yesudas	Na. Muthukumar	3:11
"Kadhal Kadhal"	Harish Raghavendra	Pa. Vijay	4:27
"Maathu Maathu"	Timmy, Suchitra, Dhina	Snehan	4:44
"Madham Pudicha"	Sunitha Sarathy	Pa. Vijay	4:13
"Ooria Marandhom"	Hariharan	M. G. Kanniappan	4:50
"Oyyalae"	Silambarasan, Malathy	Snehan	3:43
"Unnai Sandhithaen"	Harish Raghavendra, Harini	Na. Muthukumar	3:50

== Reception ==
A reviewer from tamiloviam.com compared the film's similarities to Kadhal Desam (1996) and Japanil Kalyanaraman (1985) and concluded, "If director Sivakumar had concentrated more on the story and the screenplay, Nee Naan Nila would definitely have been an innovative film". Malini Mannath of Chennai Online wrote "It's a debutant's work, and the director has tried to give a different dimension to a love triangle. The narration is at times jerky, and the second half lags." Lajjavathi of Kalki wrote though the concept reminds of serial Kaathu Karuppu and Anbe Aaruyire its entertaining and praised director for narrating a different kind of ghost story.
