= Sambayya (film) =

1999 film by K. S. Nageswara Rao

- VCD cover
- Directed by: K. S. Nageswara Rao
- Written by: Posani Krishna Murali (Story, screenplay & dialogues)
- Produced by: Bellamkonda Suresh; Raghumudhri Srinivasa Rao (Presenter)
- Starring: Srihari; Prakash Raj; Radhika Chaudhari; Manorama
- Cinematography: Adusumilli Vijay Kumar
- Edited by: Marthand K. Venkatesh
- Music by: Vandemataram Srinivas
- Production company: Sri Sai Ganesh Productions
- Release date: 26 November 1999
- Running time: 136 minutes
- Country: India
- Language: Telugu

Sambayya is a 1999 Telugu-language film directed by K. S. Nageswara Rao and written by Posani Krishna Murali. Produced by Bellamkonda Suresh under Sri Sai Ganesh Productions, the film stars Srihari, Prakash Raj, Radhika Chaudhari (in her acting debut), and Manorama. The music was composed by Vandemataram Srinivas. This film also marked the debut production of Bellamkonda Suresh, who later became a prominent producer in the Telugu film industry.

== Plot ==
Sambayya, a small paan-shop owner and a kind-hearted man, lives in a slum with his mother, Manorama. Their peaceful life takes a tragic turn when Manorama witnesses the chief minister’s son murdering a police inspector. Determined to expose the crime, she decides to testify in court. However, the chief minister, in collusion with corrupt police officials, discredits her as insane. Unable to bear the humiliation, Manorama takes her own life.

Sambayya is subsequently arrested under pretenses for wearing kumkum during a curfew. While in custody, his fiancée is brutally raped by the chief minister’s son, who escapes justice due to his political influence. Devastated by these events, Sambayya vows to seek vengeance.

Meanwhile, a parallel political drama unfolds as members of the opposition within the ruling party exploit Sambayya’s thirst for revenge to weaken the chief minister. Sambayya uses their help to pursue his vendetta. The film follows his journey as he confronts his enemies and exact revenge, or justice.

== Cast ==
- Srihari as Sambayya
- Prakash Raj
- Radhika Chaudhari as Sambayya's fiancé
- Manorama as Sambayya's mother
- Jayaram
- Ranganath
- Jayaprakash Reddy
- M. S. Narayana
- M. Balayya
- Narra Venkateswara Rao
- Jeeva
- Mallikarjuna Rao
- Brahmaji
- Vinod Kumar
- Surya
- Banerjee
- Kavitha
- Siva Parvathi
- Venu Madhav
- Bandla Ganesh

== Music ==
The film's music was composed by Vandemataram Srinivas, with lyrics penned by Bhuvana Chandra. The soundtrack features songs by renowned playback singers S. P. Balasubrahmanyam and Swarnalatha.

1. "Bhadradri Ramachandra"
2. "Endi Iddari"

== Reception ==
Sri of Telugucinema.com reviewed Sambayya as a routine political revenge drama with strong performances by Srihari and Manorama, noting Posani Krishna Murali's impactful dialogues despite a dated storyline.

Griddaluru Gopala Rao of Zamin Ryot gave the film a positive review, praising Posani Krishna Murali's socially conscious script and dialogues, which reflect contemporary politics, as well as Srihari's performance.
