= Nyayangal Jayikkattum =

- Directed by: Sivachandran
- Written by: Sivachandran
- Starring: Sivakumar; Lakshmi; Aishwarya
- Cinematography: Baby Philips
- Edited by: B. Lenin; V. T. Vijayan
- Music by: Shankar–Ganesh
- Production company: Kavitha Chithra Films
- Release date: 1 June 1990
- Country: India
- Language: Tamil

Nyayangal Jayikkattum (transl. May justice prevail) is a 1990 Indian Tamil-language film written and directed by Sivachandran. The film stars Sivakumar, Lakshmi and Aishwarya. It was released on 1 June 1990.

== Plot ==
The film revolves around the enmity between two politicians, Satyabharati and Tamilkannan.

== Cast ==
- Sivakumar as Sathyabharathi and Muthuvelu
- Lakshmi as Saraswati
- Aishwarya as Kalaiselvi (Saraswati's daughter)
- Vinod Kumar as Tamilkannan's son
- S. S. Chandran
- Kitty as Tamilkannan
- Jai Ganesh as Jagan
- Usilai Mani
- R. S. Shivaji
- Kovai Sarala
- K. S. Jayalakshmi as Mangalam
- Balambika as Stella
- Rajalakshmi as Latha
- Sivachandran as Victor Raj (uncredited)
- Disco Shanti cameo in song "Mogambo"

== Production ==
Nyayangal Jayikkattum was Aishwarya's first Tamil film. It was originally titled Pethavanga Mathavanga.

== Soundtrack ==
The soundtrack was composed by Shankar–Ganesh, while the lyrics were written by Vaali.

Track listing
| No. | Title | Singer(s) | Length |
|---|---|---|---|
| 1. | "Yaanaikatti" | Mano, P. Susheela, K. S. Chithra | 4:36 |
| 2. | "Kaagangal Parandhaalum" | K. J. Yesudas | 4:18 |
| 3. | "Mogambo Mogambo" | Vani Jairam | 4:41 |
| 4. | "Pudhumugam Poomugam" | S. P. Balasubrahmanyam, K. S. Chithra | 4:16 |
| Total length: | | | 17:51 |

== Release and reception ==
Nyayangal Jayikkattum was released on 1 June 1990. N. Krishnaswamy of The Indian Express wrote, "Sivachandran's script does get you involved in the film and concerned about its characters." C. R. K. of Kalki praised the performances of lead artistes but was critical of certain scenes and logical mistakes.
