= Chalanum =

1975 film

Chalanam
- Directed by: N. R. Pillai
- Written by: Ponkunnam Varkey
- Screenplay by: Ponkunnam Varkey
- Produced by: Ponkunnam Varkey
- Starring: KPAC Lalitha; Lakshmi; Mohan Sharma
- Cinematography: Masthan
- Edited by: M. S. Mani
- Music by: G. Devarajan
- Production company: Kavyadhara
- Distributed by: Kavyadhara
- Release date: 30 January 1975
- Country: India
- Language: Malayalam

Chalanam is a 1975 Indian Malayalam film, directed by N. R. Pillai and produced by Ponkunnam Varkey. The film stars KPAC Lalitha, Lakshmi, Mohan Sharma and Radhika in the lead roles. The film has musical score by G. Devarajan.

Lakshmi won the Filmfare Award for Best Malayalam Actress for this movie.

== Cast ==
- KPAC Lalitha
- Lakshmi
- Mohan Sharma
- Radhika
- Alummoodan
- Janardanan
- Kuthiravattam Pappu
- P. K. Abraham
- Rani Chandra
- Sudheer
- Veeran

== Soundtrack ==
The music was composed by G. Devarajan and the lyrics were written by Vayalar.

| No. | Song | Singers | Lyrics | Length (m:ss) |
|---|---|---|---|---|
| 1 | "Athyunnathangalil" | P. Jayachandran, P. Madhuri | Vayalar | |
| 2 | "Chandanacholapoothu" | P. Madhuri, Chorus | Vayalar | |
| 3 | "Kurisupallikunnile" | P. Madhuri | Vayalar | |
| 4 | "Rashtrashilpikal" | P. Jayachandran, P. Madhuri, Chorus | Vayalar | |
| 5 | "Sarppasanthathikale Ningalkku" | P. Jayachandran, Chorus | Vayalar | |
