= Srihari =

Indian actor (1964–2013)

- Born: 15 August 1964; Elamarru, Andhra Pradesh, India
- Died: 9 October 2013 (aged 49); Mumbai, Maharashtra, India
- Occupation: Actor
- Years active: 1987–2013
- Spouse: Disco Shanti (m. 1996)
- Children: 3
- Relatives: C. L. Anandan (father-in-law); Lalitha Kumari (sister-in-law)

Srihari (15 August 1964 – 9 October 2013) was an Indian actor who was active mainly in Telugu cinema. He appeared in some Tamil, Kannada and Hindi films as well. He won seven Nandi Awards and one Filmfare Award.

== Early life ==
Srihari was born on 15 August 1964 in Elamarru near Gudivada in Krishna district, Andhra Pradesh. His parents moved to Hyderabad and settled in Balanagar, when he was still a child. He had worked as a newspaper boy and milkman. He started his career as a stunt fighter. He was also an athlete in gymnastics. He was offered jobs such as sub-inspector of police and railway officer, but he rejected those offers because he was interested in pursuing an acting career.

Srihari completed his degree in 1986. He was introduced into movies by Dasari Narayana Rao with a role in the movie Brahma Nayudu (1987).

== Personal life ==
Srihari married South Indian actress Shanti, popularly known as Disco Shanti, in 1996. The couple has two sons and a daughter. Their daughter, Akshara, died when she was just four months old. The family started the Akshara Foundation in her memory, which aims to supply fluoride – free drinking water for three villages he adopted in the Ranga Reddy district. He donated over 50% of his earnings for the cause of this foundation. He also adopted four villages in Medchal. Their son, Meghamsh, made his debut with Rajdhooth (2019).

== Death ==
While shooting for the film R... Rajkumar, he complained of dizziness and was rushed to Lilavati Hospital. On 9 October 2013, he died in Lilavati Hospital in Mumbai, aged 49, after suffering a liver illness. He was buried next to his daughter.

== Awards and nominations ==
Filmfare Awards

- Filmfare Best Supporting Actor Award (Telugu) – Nuvvostanante Nenoddantana (2005)

Nandi Awards

- Best Villain – Taj Mahal (1995)
- Special Jury Award – Sri Ramulayya (1998)
- Special Jury Award – Police, Ramasakkanodu (1999)
- Special Jury Award – Vijayaramaraju (2000)
- Best Supporting Actor – Nuvvostanante Nenoddantana (2005)
- Sarojini Devi Award for a Film on National Integration - Hanumanthu (2006)

== Filmography ==
=== Telugu films ===
List of Srihari Telugu film credits
Year	Title	Role	Notes	Ref.
1984	Yuddham			
1987	Brahma Nayudu			
1988	Intinti Bhagavatam			
1989	Lankeshwarudu			
1989	Black Tiger			
1989	Two Town Rowdy			
1990	Anna Thammudu			
1991	Super Express	Ratan		
1991	Agni Nakshatram			
1992	Dharma Kshetram	Sobhanadri		
1992	Rowdy Inspector			
1992	Bharatham			
1992	Raktha Tharpanam			
1993	Mutha Mestri			
1993	Shabash Ramu			
1993	Allari Priyudu			
1993	Kunthi Putrudu			
1993	Rowdy Gari Teacher			
1993	Major Chandrakanth			
1994	Samaram	Adiseshan's henchman		
1994	Allari Premikudu	Hari		
1994	Doragariki Donga Pellam			
1994	Gharana Alludu	Ali Khan		
1994	Hello Brother	Simhachalam		
1994	Rickshaw Rudraiah			
1994	Hello Alludu			
1995	Street Fighter	S.I. Babu		
1995	Gharana Bullodu			
1995	Bhale Bullodu			
1995	Raja Simham			
1995	Telugu Veera Levara	Chowdappa		
1995	Taj Mahal			
1995	Alluda Majaka	Vasundhara's brother		
1996	Sri Krishnarjuna Vijayam	Duryodhana		
1996	Pellala Rajyam			
1996	Nayudu Gari Kutumbam	Kameshwara Rao		
1996	Bobbili Bullodu			
1996	Ramudochadu	Nagaraju		
1997	Jai Bajrangbali			
1997	Korukunna Priyudu	Bhargava		
1997	Veedevadandi Babu			
1997	Collector Garu			
1997	Gokulamlo Seeta	Hari		
1997	Nenu Premisthunnanu			
1997	Bobbili Dora			
1997	Muddula Mogudu	Rowdy		
1997	Preminchukundam Raa	Sivudu		
1997	Nayanamma	Mahankali		
1998	Aavida Maa Aavide	Kirloskar		
1998	Bavagaru Bagunnara?	Kanaka Raju		
1998	Raayudu			
1998	Yuvarathna Rana			
1998	Sri Ramulayya			
1998	O Panaipothundi Babu	Ajhar Bhai		
1998	Pellaadi Choopista			
1998	Suryudu			
1998	Subhavartha			
1998	Premante Idera	Police Officer Muralidhar		
1998	Subhalekhalu			
1998	Manasichi Choodu			
1998	Abhishekam			
1999	Yamajathakudu	Srinath		
1999	Preminche Manasu			
1999	Raja Kumarudu	Narasimha Rayudu		
1999	Preyasi Rave	AV Rao		
1999	Alludugaaru Vachcharu			
1999	Premaku Velayara	Appa Rao		
1999	Bobbili Vamsam	Madhava Rayudu		
1999	Pedda Manushulu			
1999	Samudram	C.I. Srihari		
1999	Sambayya			
1999	Telangana			
1999	Police	Ashok		
1999	Mechanic Mavayya	Prithvi		
2000	Balaram	Balaram		
2000	Ganapathi	Ganapathi		
2000	Vijayaramaraju	Vijayaramaraju		
2000	Ayodhya Ramayya	Ayodhya Ramayya / SP Patnaik	Dual role	
2000	Sivaji	Sivaji		
2000	Bagunnara			
2001	Cheliya Cheliya Chirukopama			
2001	Maa Aayana Sundarayya	Bangara Sundarayya		
2001	Orey Thammudu	Srinivasa Yadav		
2001	Evadra Rowdy	Dhanvi		
2001	Thank You Subba Rao	Subba Rao		
2001	Apparao Ki Oka Nela Thappindi			
2001	Bhadrachalam	Bhadrachalam		
2002	Parasuram	Parasuram		
2002	Prema Donga			
2002	Kubusam	Sivaram		
2002	Prudhvi Narayana	Prudhvi / Narayana	Dual role	
2003	Coolie			
2003	Simhachalam	Simhachalam		
2004	Seshadri Naidu	Seshadri Naidu		
2004	Guri	Subhash Chandra Bose		
2004	K.D. No.1	Krishna / Ramu	Dual role	
2005	Okkade	SP Yugandhar		
2005	Mahanandi	Swamy		
2005	Nuvvostanante Nenoddantana	Sivarama Krishna		
2006	Hanumanthu	Hanumanthu (Dual role)	Also producer	
2007	Dhee	Shankar Goud		
2007	Sri Mahalakshmi	Lakshmi Krishna Devaraya		
2007	Viyyalavari Kayyalu	Rayudu		
2008	Premabhishekam	Hari Bhai		
2008	Ganapathi			
2008	Saroja	ACP V. Ravichandran	Telugu version	
2008	Poru			
2008	King	Gnaneshwar Bhai		
2009	Mesthri	Hari		
2009	Magadheera	Sher Khan, Solomon (Dual role)		
2009	Samrajyam	Sardar		
2009	Srisailam	Srisailam		
2010	Dasanna	Das		
2010	Bhairava	Bhairava		
2010	Don Seenu	Narsing		
2010	Broker	Dharma Teja		
2010	Brindavanam	Shiva Prasad alias Sivudu		
2011	Aha Naa Pellanta	Durga		
2012	Ko Ante Koti	Maya Master		
2012	Shirdi Sai	Colonel Wales		
2012	Yamaho Yama	Yama		
2013	Jabardasth	Javed Ibrahim		
2013	Sri Jagadguru Aadi Sankara	Govinda Bhagavatpada		
2013	Toofan	Sher Khan		
2013	Police Game			
2014	Yuddham	Shankar Anna		
2014	Jabilli Kosam Aakashamalle			
2014	Rough	Siddharth		
2015	Ranam 2		Posthumously released; Reused footage from unreleased film Mudra	
2020	Narthanasala	Bheem	Posthumously released	
2025	Court		posthumous photographic appearance	

=== Tamil films ===
List of Srihari Tamil film credits
Year	Title	Role	Notes
1989	Mappillai	Henchman	Uncredited role
1992	Bharathan	Uttam Singh	Guest appearance
1993	Rajadhi Raja Raja Kulothunga Raja Marthanda; Raja Gambeera Kathavaraya Krishna Kamarajan	Rao	
1994	Athiradi Padai	Adiseshan's henchman	
1996	Alexander	Hari	
2009	Vettaikkaaran	Devaraj IPS	
2011	Markandeyan	Varada	
2015	Pallikoodam Pogamale	JP	Posthumously released

=== Films in other languages ===
List of Srihari film credits in other languages
Year	Title	Role	Language	Notes
1999	O Premave		Kannada	
2003	Ondagona Baa		Kannada	
2012	Ko Ko	Sri Hari Prasad	Kannada	
2013	R... Rajkumar	Ajit Taaka	Hindi	Posthumously released
