= Parvaiyin Marupakkam =

- Poster
- Directed by: K. M. Balakrishnan
- Screenplay by: M.Sirajudeen
- Story by: M.Sirajudeen
- Produced by: Palani T. C. Ramakrishnan
- Starring: Vijayakanth; Sripriya
- Cinematography: B. S. Lokanath; R. Raghunatha Reddy
- Music by: Chandrabose
- Production company: Kannmani Creations
- Release date: 19 February 1982
- Running time: 130 minutes
- Country: India
- Language: Tamil

Parvaiyin Marupakkam (transl. The other side of eyesight) is a 1982 Indian Tamil-language thriller film directed by K. M. Balakrishnan, starring Vijayakanth. The film explores the concept of hypnotism, and has an ensemble cast including M. N. Nambiar, Sripriya, Sivachandran and Silk Smitha. Parthiban and Rohini in the early stage of their career, did supporting roles in this film. It was released on 19 February 1982.

== Plot ==
Peter is a professor of hypnotism, and has dedicated his life to research on hypnotism. He often visits his old friend, who is a priest in the Siva temple in the village of Pooncholai. Viswanath and Ramji are petty thieves released from prison. They plan to steal the gold Nataraja statue and jewels from the temple. During the heist, they are caught by the priest and his wife. As a result, Viswanath ties them to a tree and burns them alive. The priest's children Vijay and Geetha are witness to this incident. Geetha's eyes get burnt while trying to save their parents and she is blinded. Viswanath and Ramji go to the city with this stolen wealth and successfully establish a posh life for themselves. Vijay and Geetha live under the care of Professor Peter. Peter teaches Vijay the art of hypnotism.

Many years later, now Vijay is a master of hypnotism. Despite Peter's repeated request to not use hypnotism with harmful intent, Vijay refuses to listen to him, and leaves him. Vijay tries to find a groom for Geetha, but since Geetha is blind, most of the grooms refuse to marry her. Viswanath, now a wealthy business magnate in the city has 5 children Siva, Chitra, Shankar, Anita and Rohini. Anita, the eldest of them all, loves the care free life and parties all the time. Siva is a police officer, while Chitra is a lawyer and public prosecutor. Shankar and Rohini study in college. Chitra fights against the corrupt Ramji, and is frequently seen in court arguing with lawyer Parthiban who defends Ramji. This creates a lot of problems between Ramji and Viswanath, and they avoid each other. Vijay, who has been waiting all his life to take revenge, now uses hypnotism to take revenge on Viswanath's family. He kills Anita at a resort where she is partying. He hypnotises Shankar's girlfriend into a trance, and makes her kill Shankar. Siva, the investigating officer in the murder cases, is confused by the fact that Shankar's girlfriend does not remember anything about Shankar's murder, even though she was caught with the knife in her hand. Meanwhile, Vijay starts dating Chitra, to take revenge, but eventually falls in love with her.

Siva eventually finds Peter during his investigation. Peter reveals to him that one of his students Vijay refused to listen to him and left him after mastering hypnotism. Meanwhile, Rohini and a boy from her college take some pictures in Viswanath's bedroom using her automatically timed Camera. Viswanath sees this and beats the boy, and locks Rohini up in her room. When he comes back to his room, Vijay is waiting for him. Vijay goes on to hypnotise and kill him, but is unaware of the Camera which is filming. The rest of the film deals with the constant pursuit of Siva behind Vijay. In the climax, the police manage to kill Vijay. Chitra also dies in the gunfire. Before Vijay and Chitra die, they give Geetha's hand to Siva (seemingly indicating that Siva marries Geetha and takes care of her).

== Cast ==
- Vijayakanth as Vijay
- Sripriya as Chitra
- M. N. Nambiar as Viswanath
- V.Gopalakrishnan as Professor Peter
- K. K. Soundar as Vijay's father
- Sivachandran as Siva
- Vanitha as Geetha
- Rohini as Viswanath's daughter
- Parthiban as a lawyer
- Silk Smitha as Anitha
- Meena as Baby Geetha
- Kumarimuthu as a lawyer

== Soundtrack ==
The soundtrack was composed by Chandrabose.

Track listing
| No. | Title | Lyrics | Singer(s) | Length |
|---|---|---|---|---|
| 1. | "Devathai Puriyum Thavangal" | Vairamuthu | Vani Jairam |
| 2. | "Poovachu Poothuvandu Maasam" | Vaali | P. Jayachandran, P. Susheela |
| 3. | "Santhosha Nerangal Sangeetham" | Vairamuthu | P. Susheela, S. P. Balasubrahmanyam |
| 4. | "Paarvaiyin Marupakkam" | Kannadasan | Vani Jairam |

== Reception ==
Kalki wrote if the film has hypnotic power, it will attract the fans and become a hit.
