= Kurinji Malar =

- Logo
- குறிஞ்சி மலர்
- Genre: Soap opera
- Directed by: Devibala; Viduthalai
- Creative director: Kuyil Mozhi
- Starring: Vijay babu Aishwarya; Sai Latha
- Theme music composer: C. Sathya (Title Song); Aravind Siddhartha (Background Score)
- Opening theme: "Kannum Kannum"; Thamarai (Lyrics)
- Country of origin: India
- Original language: Tamil
- No. of seasons: 1
- No. of episodes: 240

Production
- Cinematography: C. Dhanapalan
- Editor: Sajin C
- Camera setup: Multi-camera
- Running time: approx. 20–22 minutes per episode

Original release
- Network: Kalaignar TV
- Release: 2013 – 25 September 2014

Related
- Amudha Oru Aacharyakuri

Kurunji Malar (Tamil: குறிஞ்சி மலர்) is a Tamil soap opera that aired on Kalaignar TV. It aired Monday through Friday at 9:00PM IST. The show stars Vijay Babu, Aishwarya, Sai Latha and Nithiya. The show last aired on 25 September 2014 and ended with 240 episodes.

The channel started repeat airs of this serial on 23 November 2015 and aired Monday through Friday at 12:30PM IST.

== Cast ==
- Vijay babu
- Aishwarya as Kalpana
- Sai Latha
- Nithiya
- Rajasekhar
- Sanjey
- Kumaresan
- Nesan
- Piraksh
- Meenakshi
