= Pathimoonam Number Veedu =

- Poster
- Directed by: Baby
- Written by: Baby; Irugur Elavarasan (dialogues)
- Produced by: Aasha Creations
- Starring: Nizhalgal Ravi; Sadhana; Lalitha Kumari
- Cinematography: K. B. Dhayalan; C. E. Babu
- Edited by: G. Murali
- Music by: Sangeetha Rajan
- Production company: Aasha Creations
- Release date: 15 June 1990
- Running time: 110 minutes
- Country: India
- Language: Tamil

Pathimoonam Number Veedu (transl. House number 13) is a 1990 Indian Tamil-language horror film directed by Baby. The film stars Nizhalgal Ravi, Sadhana and Lalitha Kumari. It was released on 15 June 1990 and became a success. The film was remade in Hindi as House No. 13 (1991) again directed by Baby.

== Plot ==
Selvam (Nizhalgal Ravi), an estate manager, and his family move into a new house based in a remote village. There, Selvam falls in love with Annam (Sadhana), a jolly village girl. Disturbed by a ghost (Lalitha Kumari), Selvam's grandfather dies from a heart attack. One day, Murali (Jaishankar), Selvam's brother, goes to an isolated home and treats an old lady. The next day, he realizes that the old lady was a ghost and he also dies from a heart attack. The family, in mourning, decides to arrange Selvam's wedding with Annam to forget this tragedy. Thereafter, Annam becomes pregnant but even after 10 months, she doesn't deliver. A Gurukkal (Ra. Sankaran) comes to the aid of the family and he feels that something has stopped her delivery. He prepares a ritual and the ghost finally appears and tells him about her past.

The ghost was the young woman named Rekha. She lived happily with her husband (Chandrakanth) but her husband had a lot of bad habits and also had a lot of debts. Under pressures, he forced his wife Rekha to have a sexual relationship with the house owner. She refused and killed the house owner. Afterwards, her angry husband killed her in turn. She then became a ghost and killed her husband.The ghost also reveals that the house owner was actually Selvam's father, which made her to take revenge on his family. Since that day of her husband's death, she killed every male who stayed in the house.

== Cast ==
- Nizhalgal Ravi as Selvam
- Sadhana as Annam
- Lalitha Kumari as Rekha / Ghost
- Jaishankar as Murali
- Sripriya as Shanthi (Murali's wife)
- Chandrakanth as Rekha's husband
- Nalinikanth
- Achamillai Gopi as Muthu
- Ra. Sankaran as Swamy
- S. N. Parvathiy as Parvathi, Selvam and Murali's mother
- Baby Manju as Manju

== Soundtrack ==
The soundtrack was composed by Sangeetha Rajan, with lyrics written by Pulamaipithan.

Song	Singer(s)	Duration
"Koko Koko Koko"	Suchithra	4:28
"Kandathu Ellam Mayyama"	K. S. Chithra	1:26
"Kalyana Penne"	Mano, S. P. Balasubrahmanyam	4:15
