= House No. 13 =

1991 Indian film by Baby

- Directed by: Baby
- Written by: Baby
- Screenplay by: Baby
- Starring: Anil Dhawan; Salim Fateh; Rita Bhaduri; Sharat Saxena
- Release date: 1991
- Country: India
- Language: Hindi

House No. 13 is a 1991 Bollywood horror film starring Anil Dhawan, Salim Fateh, Rita Bhaduri, and Sharat Saxena. The film was a remake of Tamil film Pathimoonam Number Veedu (1990).

== Plot ==
The movie begins as a couple reach a house named House No. 13. And as soon as they enter the house, a series of mysterious events begins revolving around them and every member of the family gets killed by an unknown spirit of a lady.

== Cast ==
- Anil Dhawan
- Salim Fateh
- Rita Bhaduri
- Sharat Saxena

== Soundtrack ==
#	Song title	Singer(s)
1	"Aaja Re Saajna"	Kavita Krishnamurthy
2	"Chanda Mama"	Anuradha Paudwal
3	"Dil The Tera"	Vinod Rathod
4	"Kar Liya Hai"	Vinod Rathod, Kavita Krishnamurthy
