= Subba Rayudi Pelli =

- Movie Poster
- Directed by: Dasari Narayana Rao
- Written by: Satyanand (dialogues)
- Screenplay by: Dasari Narayana Rao
- Story by: Dasari Narayana Rao
- Produced by: A. Siddha Reddy; M. Chandra Reddy; P. Munikrishna
- Starring: Rajendra Prasad; Aishwarya
- Cinematography: Chalasani Sri Ram Prasad
- Edited by: B. Krishnam Raju
- Music by: Vasu Rao
- Production company: Gowri Shankar Creations
- Release date: 25 March 1992
- Country: India
- Language: Telugu

Subba Rayudi Pelli is a 1992 Telugu-language comedy film, produced by A. Siddha Reddy, M. Chandra Reddy and P. Munikrishna under the Gowri Shankar Creations banner and directed by Dasari Narayana Rao. It stars Rajendra Prasad and Aishwarya with music composed by Vasu Rao.

== Cast ==
- Rajendra Prasad as Subba Rayudu
- Aishwarya as Lalitha
- Rami Reddy
- Allu Ramalingaiah
- Subhalekha Sudhakar
- Brahmanandam
- Babu Mohan
- Mada
- Maganti Sudhakar
- Jayalalita
- Silk Smitha
- Y. Vijaya

== Soundtrack ==
All music is composed by Vasu Rao

Track Listing
No.	Title	Lyrics	Singer(s)	Length
1.	"Ayyo Rayyo Rabba"	Bhuvanachandra	S. P. Balasubrahmanyam, K. S. Chithra	5:12
2.	"Om Premaya Namaha"	Sirivennela Seetharama Sastry	S. P. Balasubrahmanyam	5:18
3.	"Vayasaa Elaa Moyagalavee"	Sirivennela Seetharama Sastry	K. S. Chithra	5:53
4.	"Paccha Pacchani Cheera"	Jaladi Raja Rao	S. P. Balasubrahmanyam, K. S. Chithra	4:58
5.	"Enkammo Langaa Lungi"	Jaladi Raja Rao	Mano, Radhika	5:21
Total length:				26:42
