= Image (film) =

Indian drama film

- Directed by: K. Alex Pandian
- Starring: Jaivarma; Abhinayashree
- Edited by: Mohanraj
- Music by: J. Surya
- Production company: Imayam Entertainers
- Release date: 14 January 2004
- Country: India
- Language: Tamil

Image is a 2004 Indian Tamil-language drama film directed by K. Alex Pandian and starring Jaivarma and Abhinayashree.

== Plot ==
Satish and Sri, two arts college students, take a trip to the jungle to capture its beauty. At the same time, a bank is robbed and the police suspect that they are the robbers. The robbers take refuge in the jungle. Private detective Vijay suspects bank manager Kavya and her brother Prakash of being involved. How he figures out who is involved and the true robbers forms the rest of the film.

== Cast ==
- Jaivarma as Satish
- Abhinayashree as Sri
- Prakash as Prakash
- Ambika as Kavya
- Vijaykannan as Vijay
- Chinna Silk as a bank robber
- Vandana
- Vinu Chakravarthy
- Balu Anand
- Thirai Neethi Selvam
- Suruli Manohar

== Production ==
The film is directed by K. Alex Pandian, who previously directed Aankalai Nambathey (1987) and My India (1996). The film began production in 2003 and Abhinayashree made her debut as a heroine through this film. The film was shot at Kolli Hills, Ooty and Tada. A song set designed by Mohan Rajendran was erected at Sriraghavendra studio and partly shot at a lake near Kolli Hills. The stunts were choreographed by Jaguar Thangam. Jai Varma slipped and fell when trying to save Abhinayashree and they were saved by the director and producer.

== Reception ==
Malini Mannath of Chennai Online wrote that "For, not much thought seems to have gone into the working of the script or its narrative style. Added to that, the director seems undecided whether his film should be a comedy or a serious cop-robber film. So it shuttles between the two, at times being unintentionally funny".
