= Bhale Bullodu =

- DVD cover
- Directed by: Sarath
- Written by: Tanikella Bharani; Janardhan Maharshi; Ramesh-Gopi (dialogues)
- Screenplay by: Sarath
- Story by: M. D. Sundar
- Produced by: V. B. Rajendra Prasad
- Starring: Jagapathi Babu; Soundarya
- Cinematography: N. Sudhakar Reddy
- Edited by: D. Venkataratnam
- Music by: Koti
- Production company: Jagapathi Art Pictures
- Release date: 14 April 1995
- Running time: 128 minutes
- Country: India
- Language: Telugu

Bhale Bullodu is a 1995 Telugu-language comedy drama film, produced by V. B. Rajendra Prasad under the Jagapathi Art Pictures banner and directed by Sarath. It stars Jagapathi Babu, Soundarya and music composed by Koti.

== Plot ==
The film begins at a central jail where a convict, Jayanti, is on life for slaying her lover, Krishna Mohan Rao. Following, she gives birth to baby boy Chinna in prison and names sentry Shantamma as his guardian. Plus, she needs to safeguard him from her malevolent maternal uncle Papa Rao & his son Hari, who beset her for the property. Besides, Krishna is a chronic bachelor and misogynist owing to the past of his elder sibling, no other than Krishna Mohan Rao. Radha, a fine girl, admires his attitude and falls for him on behalf of his turndown.

Presently, Chinna is ten years old, Shantamma is aging, and her health is deteriorating. Hence, Jayanti asks Shantamma to do one thing when she presents Krishna as his father before Chinna by facing away. From there, he pursues him as white on rice, Krishna whacks to dispose of him but fails. At length, he admits him to an orphanage. Meanwhile, as Radha's irk rises daily, Krishna takes her to the task. As a result, she attempts suicide when Krishna reciprocates, realizing her true adoration. During their wedding, Chinna lands with all the evidence and verifies Krishna as his father. Krishna must care for Chinna legally, which bedevils him and creates a rift in his marital life. Thus, vexed Krishna dumps Chinna far away in a forest but later discerns his error.

In the interim, Chinna spots Papa Rao & Hari slaughtering a person in the forest, takes the heels, and they behind him. Anyhow, Krishna retrieves Chinna and eventually dotes on him. Afterward, Krishna traces the Shantamma lying in an ailing position. Before leaving her breath, she divulges that Chinna is not his son but fails to proclaim the actuality. Listening to it, Radha recognizes her husband's integrity. Whereas Chinna regrets and silently quits the house. Perturbed, Krishna announces a paper advertisement to find Chinna's whereabouts. Viewing it, Jayanti absconds from the prison to rescue her son. Moreover, Papa Rao discovers that Jayanti's son and the kid who witnessed their crime are the same and ploys to eliminate him. Soon, Krishna & Jayanti approaches Chinna when she states he is his brother's progeny. Indeed, Papa Rao is the true killer who murdered Krishna Mohana Rao and incriminated Jayanti. Being conscious of it, Krishna apologizes to Jayanti and accepts her as his sister-in-law. Consequently, Papa Rao & Hari attacks them, and a brawl erupts. At last, Krishna ceases the virulent, but tragically, Jayanti sacrifices her life while guarding Chinna. Finally, the movie ends happily, with Krishna & Radha fostering Chinna.

== Cast ==
- Jagapathi Babu as Krishna
- Soundarya as Radha
- Jayasudha as Jayanti
- Kota Srinivasa Rao as Papa Rao
- Srihari as Hari
- Allu Ramalingaiah as Radha's grandfather
- Babu Mohan as Chemcha Bhima Rao
- Sudhakar as Balu
- Tanikella Bharani as S.I. Kubakonam Kanda Swamy
- Giri Babu as Krishna's paternal uncle
- Chalapathi Rao as Mataiah
- Raja as Krishna Mohan Rao
- Mada as a broker
- Jayalalita as Nandivardhanam
- Silk Smitha as item number
- Disco Shanthi as item number
- Kalpana Rai as Parijatam
- Nirmalamma as Santhamma
- Master Prabhu as Chinna

== Soundtrack ==
Bhale Bullodu

Film score by Koti
- Released: 1995
- Recorded: 26:22
- Genre: Soundtrack
- Label: Supreme Music
- Producer: Koti

Koti chronology
Love Game (1995)	Bhale Bullodu (1995)	Rikshavodu (1995)

Music composed by Koti. Music released on Supreme Music Company.

No.	Title	Lyrics	Singer(s)	Length
1.	"Akkada Ikkada"	Veturi	S. P. Balasubrahmanyam, Chitra	4:54
2.	"Yasukora Naarigaa"	Veturi	S. P. Sailaja, Chitra	4:08
3.	"Muddu Mudduga"	Bhuvanachandra	S. P. Balasubrahmanyam, Chitra	4:20
4.	"Nee Bumperu Soku"	Veturi	S. P. Balasubrahmanyam, Chitra	4:44
5.	"Amma Nanna Leni"	Veturi	Radhika	3:23
6.	"Chinadani Cheera Chudu"	Bhuvanachandra	S. P. Balasubrahmanyam, Chitra	4:53
Total length:				26:22
