= Rajadhi Raja Raja Kulothunga Raja Marthanda Raja Gambeera Kathavaraya Krishna Kamarajan =

1993 film by Balu Anand

- Poster
- Directed by: Balu Anand
- Written by: Balu Anand
- Produced by: J. A. Mohammed Ali
- Starring: Mansoor Ali Khan; Nandhini
- Cinematography: Thangar Bachan
- Edited by: KMP Kumar
- Music by: Songs: Mansoor Ali Khan; Score: S. P. Venkatesh
- Production company: Raj Kennedy Films
- Release date: 24 June 1993
- Running time: 140 minutes
- Country: India
- Language: Tamil

Rajadhi Raja Raja Kulothunga Raja Marthanda Raja Gambeera Kathavaraya Krishna Kamarajan also known by the initialism RRRKRMRGKK, is a 1993 Indian Tamil-language action film written and directed by Balu Anand. The film stars Mansoor Ali Khan and Nandhini, with Napoleon, Srihari, Uday Prakash, Nagesh, Jai Ganesh, Vennira Aadai Moorthy, and S. S. Chandran playing supporting roles. It was released on 24 June 1993. This is the longest film title ever in Tamil cinema.

== Plot ==
Kulothungan is a petty thief and a master of disguise. He can dress up as a conductor or a police officer to rip off his victims. Despite being a thief, he helps the needy like Robin Hood.

Radhika, a wealthy heiress, is brought up by her three guardians: the lawyer, Subramanian, and Subramanian's wife Shalu but Shalu wants to fully benefit of Radhika's heritage and she drugs Radhika with the help of a Swamy. So Radhika later becomes mentally ill as Shalu wanted. One day, Radhika manages to get away. She ends up in a brothel and she is raped by Kulothungan who was drunk. Her guardians finally find her.

Later, Shalu hires Kulothungan to play Radhika's husband and Kulothungan marries Radhika. Kulothungan decides to protect Radhika from Shalu. Soon, Shalu joins forces with Kulothungan's enemy Rao. They kill Subramanian and blame the innocent Kulothungan. The honest police Guru Subramaniam takes charge of this odd affair. What transpires later forms the crux of the story.

== Cast ==
- Mansoor Ali Khan as Kulothungan
- Nandhini as Radhika
- Rekha
- Napoleon as Guru Subramaniam
- Srihari as Rao
- Uday Prakash
- Nagesh as Lawyer
- Jai Ganesh as Subramanian
- Vennira Aadai Moorthy as Pichumani
- S. S. Chandran
- V. K. Ramasamy
- R. Sundarrajan
- Vivek as Vivek
- Pandu
- Idichapuli Selvaraj
- T. K. S. Natarajan
- Vadivukkarasi
- Vichithra
- Silk Smitha
- Disco Shanti
- Abhilasha
- Bindu Kose
- Radha Rani
- Padmavathi
- Jayanthi
- Kumarimuthu
- Kullamani
- Oru Viral Krishna Rao
- Krishnamoorthy as Yoginder
- Gundu Kalyanam
- Thayir Vadai Desigan
- Thavakalai Chittibabu
- Karuppu Subbiah
- Vellai Subbaiah
- Master Haja Sheriff
- Nellai Siva

== Soundtrack ==
The soundtrack was composed by Mansoor Ali Khan, who also wrote the lyrics.

Song	Singer(s)	Duration
"Manichana Manichan"	Sirkazhi G. Sivachidambaram, Chandrabose	3:03
"Rajadhi Raja"	Malgudi Subha	1:45
"Aattam Podalam"	S. P. Balasubrahmanyam, Chorus	5:21
"Mama Mama"	Swarnalatha, Mansoor Ali Khan	4:26
"Marutha Marikozhundu"	T. S. Raghavendra, Vani Jairam	4:03

== Critical reception ==
Malini Mannath of The Indian Express panned the film and said: "A film strictly for his (Mansoor Ali Khan's) fans, that too the most ardent ones". K. Vijiyan of New Straits Times wrote "The director has done his best to inject as much humour, action and drama as he can".
