= Meera (1992 film) =

- Poster
- Directed by: P. C. Sreeram
- Written by: M. R. Bharathi
- Produced by: T. V. S. Mani; V. M. Chandrasekaran
- Starring: Vikram; Aishwarya
- Cinematography: P. C. Sreeram
- Edited by: B. Lenin; V. T. Vijayan
- Music by: Ilaiyaraaja
- Production company: V. M. C. Cine Creations
- Release date: 18 December 1992
- Running time: 142 minutes
- Country: India
- Language: Tamil

Meera is a 1992 Indian Tamil-language film directed by P. C. Sreeram in his directorial debut and written by M. R. Bharathi. The film stars Aishwarya as the titlular character along with Vikram, while Tarun, Poornam Viswanathan, Gandhimathi, Janagaraj, and Chinni Jayanth play supporting roles. Nassar and Sarathkumar make cameo appearances in the film. The music was composed by Ilaiyaraaja with cinematography by P. C. Sreeram and editing by B. Lenin and V. T. Vijayan. The film was released on 18 December 1992, and failed at the box office.

== Plot ==
Meera is in college and pregnant, nearing labour. Here, she tells her story of how she got to this point in a flashback.

A young man named Jeeva falls in love with her. She despises him and eventually gets him kicked out of college. After a fight with Jeeva near her house, Meera goes out for a walk and sees a woman being killed by a policeman. She is terrified and runs to the police station to report the crime. Unfortunately for her, the officer at the station is the murderer. The officer, knowing the sole witness to his crime, sends goons to her house to kill her.

By then, Meera has already left and is on the run. Jeeva goes to Meera's house and finds the maid getting beaten by the goons. There is a fight between Jeeva and the goons. Jeeva wins, and the maid tells him to go after Meera. They are now on the run, and the murderer sends six professional killers after the duo. Along the way, Meera and Jeeva get arrested by a comedic policeman and later flee. They find a blacksmith and are freed of the handcuffs, but are almost killed by the goons in the shootout.

Meera leaves Jeeva but has a change of heart and comes back. She finds the goons who have Jeeva, and the goons tie them together on train tracks. They narrowly escape. After this event, Meera admits her love for Jeeva. After a run-in with the murderer, Meera and Jeeva end up in the ocean and wash up near the house of a boy named Jesu and his grandfather. They seek refuge there, and Meera gets close to Jesu. While everyone is getting ready for Jesu's birthday, his dog runs off into the forest. The goons kill the dog and go after Meera. Meera and Jesu flee on his bike, but they fall off, and Jesu is killed.

Jeeva takes revenge, killing the goons in gruesome ways. A showdown between the murderer and Jeeva occurs, where the murderer gets the upper hand and almost succeeds, but Meera shoots him, and Jeeva sets him on fire.

The final scene is a group photo with everyone, and Meera goes into labour.

== Cast ==
- Vikram as Jeeva
- Aishwarya as Meera
- Janagaraj as Inspector Govindasamy
- Chinni Jayanth as the Inspector's assistant
- Delhi Ganesh
- Poornam Viswanathan as Meera's father
- Pradeep Shakthi as henchman
- Disco Shanti
- Gandhimathi as Jeeva's mother
- Master Tarun as Jesu
- Baby Neena as Bus passenger
- Idichapuli Selvaraj
- Mayilsamy
- Nassar as a village head
- Sarath Kumar as an unnamed policeman who murders the woman (guest appearance)
- Vennira Aadai Moorthy as College Principal (guest appearance)
- K. V. Anand as Jeeva's friend (uncredited)
- Sathya Prakash as henchman (uncredited)

== Production ==
The film marked the first high-profile project for Vikram, with the actor revealing that it was the first time he had worked on big sets.

== Soundtrack ==
The music was composed by Ilaiyaraaja, with lyrics by Vaali. The song "O Butterfly" is set in Natabhairavi, a Carnatic raga.

Song	Singers
"Lovvena Lovvu Mannenna Stovvu"	Mano, Minmini
"O Butterfly"	S. P. Balasubrahmanyam, Asha Bhosle
"O Butterfly" (Solo Version, Sad rendition)	S. P. Balasubrahmanyam
"Palli Paadama"	Mano
"Pani Vizhum Maalaiyil"	S. P. Balasubrahmanyam, Asha Bhosle
"Pazhaya Vilangu"	Asha Bhosle
"Pudhu Routeladan"	K. J. Yesudas, K. S. Chithra

== Reception ==
RPR of Kalki negatively reviewed the film, and said viewers needed Amrutanjan to cure the headaches they would receive from watching it. Sreeram felt this film was his mistake as a director.
