= Seshadri Naidu =

- Theatrical release poster
- Directed by: Suresh Varma
- Written by: Posani Krishna Murali
- Produced by: Santha Kumari Hari
- Starring: Srihari; Nanditha Jennifer
- Cinematography: Vijay C. Kumar
- Music by: Lalith Suresh
- Production company: Chalanachitra
- Release date: 23 April 2004
- Country: India
- Language: Telugu

Seshadri Naidu is a 2004 Indian Telugu-language action drama film directed by Suresh Varma and starring Srihari and Nanditha Jennifer. The film was released on 23 May 2004 to negative reviews and was a box office flop.

== Cast ==
- Srihari as Seshadri Naidu
- Nanditha Jennifer as Sathyabama
- Swathi as Seshadri Naidu's sister
- Jayaram as MLA's son
- Narra Venkateswara Rao as Venkateshwarlu
- Rami Reddy as Venkatarao
- Gokina Rama Rao
- Ranganath
- Ali
- Bhaskar
- Jeeva
- Posani Krishna Murali as Police officer
- Raju as Police officer
- Nittala
- M. Balayya
- Gundu Hanumantha Rao
- P. J. Sarma as Chief Minister of Andhra Pradesh
- Sridharanna
- Charan
- Venu
- Harsha
- Naidu Gopi
- Rama Prabha
- Sana
- Murali Pendyala

== Reception ==
Griddaluru Gopalrao of Zamin Ryot wrote that Posani Krishna Murali's "writing is bland. Neither the words nor the direction of Suresh Varma could make any scene strong". Jeevi of Idlebrain.com rated the film one-and-a-half out of five and wrote that "Over all, Seshadri Naidu disappoints you". A critic from Full Hyderabad rated the film three out of ten and wrote that "Overall, Seshadri Naidu is crooked, pseudo-flaky and hollow. And Srihari, the real star, realistically tried his best to not make it look that way.", Telugu Cinema wrote "From the opening scene where Srihari is shown in the gallows to the one where he scales the wall for escape, the shot structure is ridiculous and makes a mockery of the jails system. Not a single frame has anything to write home about the directorial skill".
