= Soundaryame Varuga Varuga =

1980 film by C. V. Sridhar

- Theatrical release poster
- Directed by: Sridhar
- Written by: Sridhar
- Produced by: B. Bharani Reddy
- Starring: Sivachandran; Sathaar; Sripriya; Rati
- Cinematography: R. K. Tiwari
- Edited by: C. Subbarao
- Music by: Vijaya Bhaskar
- Production company: Sri Bharani Chitra
- Release date: 15 January 1980
- Country: India
- Language: Tamil

Soundaryame Varuga Varuga (transl. Oh beauty, welcome! Welcome!) is a 1980 Indian Tamil-language romance film written and directed by Sridhar. The film stars Sivachandran, Sathaar, Sripriya and Rati. It was released on 15 January 1980.

== Cast ==
- Sivachandran
- Sathaar
- Prakash
- Kaikala Satyanarayana
- Sripriya
- Rati
- Pandari Bai
- Lakshmi

== Production ==
In May 1979, it was reported that Sridhar planned to shoot the film entirely in the United States.

== Soundtrack ==
The soundtrack was composed by Vijaya Bhaskar, and the lyrics were written by Vaali.

Track listing
No.	Title	Singer(s)	Length
1.	"Itho Un Kathali"	S. P. Balasubrahmanyam, Vani Jairam	5:02
2.	"Iravil Irandu"	P. Susheela, Jolly Abraham,S. P. Balasubrahmanyam, Vani Jairam	6:02
3.	"Rasam Pazha Rasam"	S. P. Balasubrahmanyam	4:43
4.	"Aagayam Thaane"	S. P. Balasubrahmanyam, Vani Jairam	4:48
5.	"Yeai Chinthamani"	L. R. Anjali, Malaysia Vasudevan	5:02
Total length:			19:35

== Release and reception ==
Soundaryame Varuga Varuga was released on 15 January 1980. Kaushikan of Kalki panned the film for its story, but appreciated the music and Prakash's performance. Naagai Dharuman of Anna praised Sridhar for capturing romantic and fight scenes well but felt he was more focused on capturing abroad than focusing on story and screenplay. He also praised the actors, music and cinematography.
