= En Uyir Kannamma =

- Poster
- Directed by: Sivachandran
- Screenplay by: Sivachandran; Aaroor Dass (dialogue)
- Story by: Sivachandran
- Produced by: S. K. Shankaralingam
- Starring: Prabhu; Radha; Lakshmi
- Cinematography: Dinesh Baboo
- Edited by: B. Lenin–V. T. Vijayan
- Music by: Ilaiyaraaja
- Production company: S.K.S. Film Creations
- Release date: 15 January 1988
- Country: India
- Language: Tamil

En Uyir Kannamma (transl. Kannamma, my life) is a 1988 Indian Tamil-language film directed by Sivachandran in his debut. The film stars Prabhu, Radha, Lakshmi and S. S. Chandran. It was released on 15 January 1988.

== Plot ==
Shanmugasundaram, a lorry cleaner, is in love with Kannamma. However, unknown to him, he had slept with a woman, Ammu, during a rainy night because he was drunk at that time. Ammu, who turns out to be pregnant, has her chastity questioned by the village. She dies while giving birth to a girl child. Kannamma hates Shanmuga for committing this mistake. Shanmugam decides to walk on fire to prove his purity. Nallamuthu, Kannamma's fiancé misbehaves with her and she saves Shanmugam from dying of a plan orchestrated by lorry driver Madhavan who was in love with Kannamma and wanted to avenge Shanmugam but turns out that both Madhavan and Nallamuthu plotted together to get them united.

== Cast ==
- Prabhu as Shanmugasundaram
- Radha as Kannamma
- Lakshmi as Ammu
- Sivachandran as Madhavan
- V. K. Ramasamy as Periyasamy
- S. S. Chandran as Panjavarnam
- Pandu
- Santhana Bharathi as Velayudham
- Radha Ravi as Nallamuthu
- Delhi Ganesh as Kannamma's father
- Jai Ganesh

== Production ==
En Uyir Kannamma marked the directorial debut of actor Sivachandran. The film marked the acting debut of Santhana Bharathi and Pandu.

== Soundtrack ==
The music was composed by Ilaiyaraaja, with lyrics by Vaali.

Song	Singers	Length
"Salangai Satham"	Malaysia Vasudevan, K. S. Chithra	01:23
"Naan Thedum"	Malaysia Vasudevan	04:23
"Naadodi Paattukkal"	S. P. Balasubrahmanyam	03:48
"Mathalam Kotta"	Malaysia Vasudevan, K. S. Chithra	04:35
"Yaarai Keattu"	K. S. Chithra	04:30
"Poombaaraiyil"	Ilaiyaraaja	04:42

== Reception ==
En Uyir Kannamma was released on 15 January 1988. N. Krishnaswamy of The Indian Express wrote "Sivachandran [..] turns director En Uyir Kannamma. His story for his own film builds up the dramatic tensions and conflicts gradually, and even in conceiving and staging the action he manages to lend a great deal of realism to some scenes". Jayamanmadhan of Kalki appreciated Lakshmi's Malayalam-accented Tamil dialogue delivery, the cinematography and the climax.
