= Lakshmi (actress) =

Indian actress (born 1952)

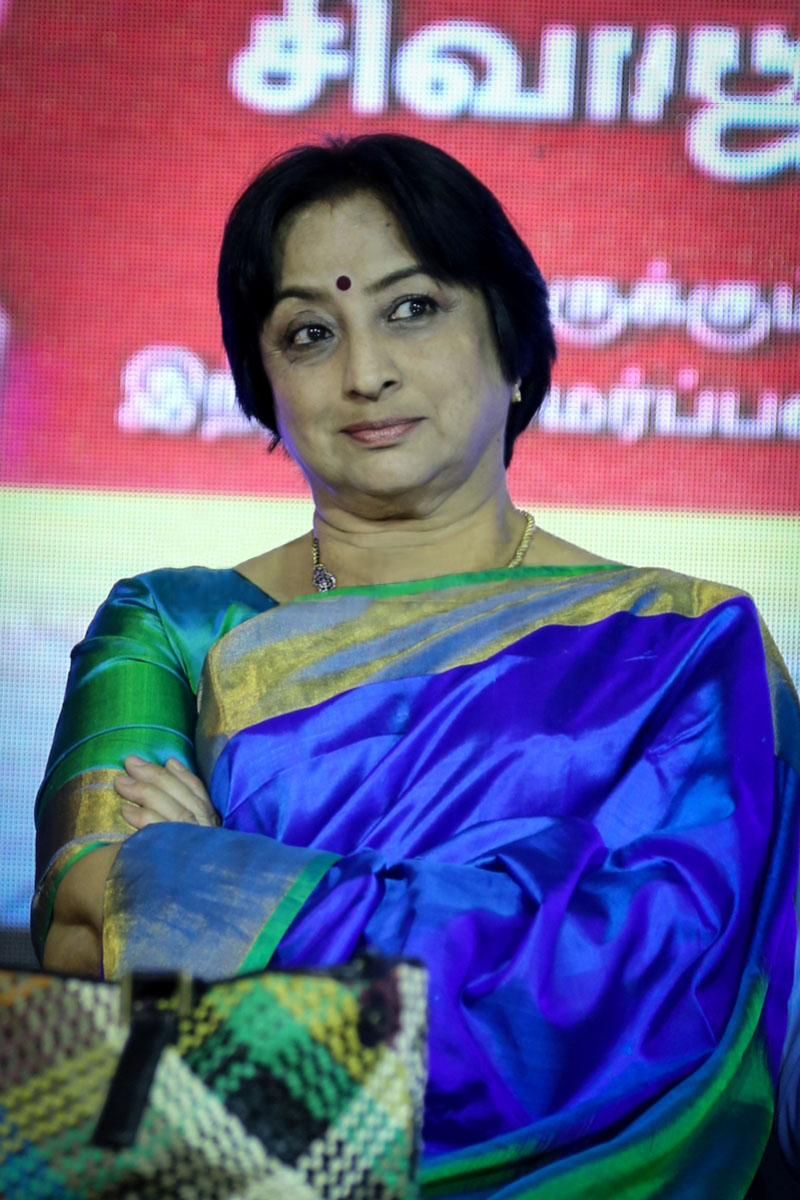
- Lakshmi at Naan Suvasikkum Sivaji book launch in 2015
- Born: Yaragudipati Venkata Mahalakshmi; 13 December 1952 (age 73); Madras, Madras State, India (present day Chennai, Tamil Nadu, India)
- Years active: 1968–present
- Spouses: Baskaran (m. 1969; div. 1974); Mohan Sharma (m. 1975; div. 1980); Sivachandran (m. 1987)
- Children: 2, including Aishwariyaa Bhaskaran
- Parent(s): Father : Y. V. Rao; Mother : Kumari Rukmani

Yaragudipati Venkata Mahalakshmi (born 13 December 1952), known professionally as Lakshmi, is an Indian actress known for her works primarily in all 4 Southern Indian language film industries (distributing her acting career across all four languages almost equally). She has also acted in some Hindi films. She debuted with the 1968 Kannada film Goa Dalli CID 999 where she played a full-fledged lead role. She made her debut in Tamil with the movie Jeevanaamsam (1968) where she played the role of lead actor's sister. She also made her debut in Telugu in the same year with the film Bandhavyalu.

In 1974, her debut Malayalam film, Chattakari went on to become a blockbuster throughout India. She has acted in over 650 films as confirmed in the popular Kannada TV Show Weekend With Ramesh on Zee Kannada channel. Her performance in Mithunam (2012) is regarded as one of the 100 Greatest Performances of the Decade by Film Companion. Lakshmi then went on to appear in a number of commercially successful films in various languages without a hesitation or diction. She dubs her voice for all of her movies, irrespective of the language and remains one of the very few critically acclaimed stars to achieve this stage.

In a career spanning more than five decades she has won one National Film Award for Best Actress, nine Filmfare Awards South, One Kerala State Film Award for Best Actress, Nandi Awards, Karnataka State Film Award for Best Actress for the movie Hoovu Hannu, the Bengal Film Journalists Association Awards and various other state awards.

Lakshmi made her Bollywood debut in 1975, with the woman-centric Julie, the remake of Malayalam film Chattakkari. After appearing as a lead actress for more than a decade, she switched over to character roles. She is the only actress who has won the Filmfare Award for Best Actress including south languages and Hindi films.

== Early life ==
Lakshmi was born and raised in Chennai, Tamil Nadu. Her mother Kumari Rukmini was a Tamil actress. Her father, Yaragudipati Varada Rao, was a Telugu producer, director, thespian, screenwriter, editor and actor known for his works predominantly in Telugu, Kannada, Malayalam and Tamil Cinema.

== Career ==
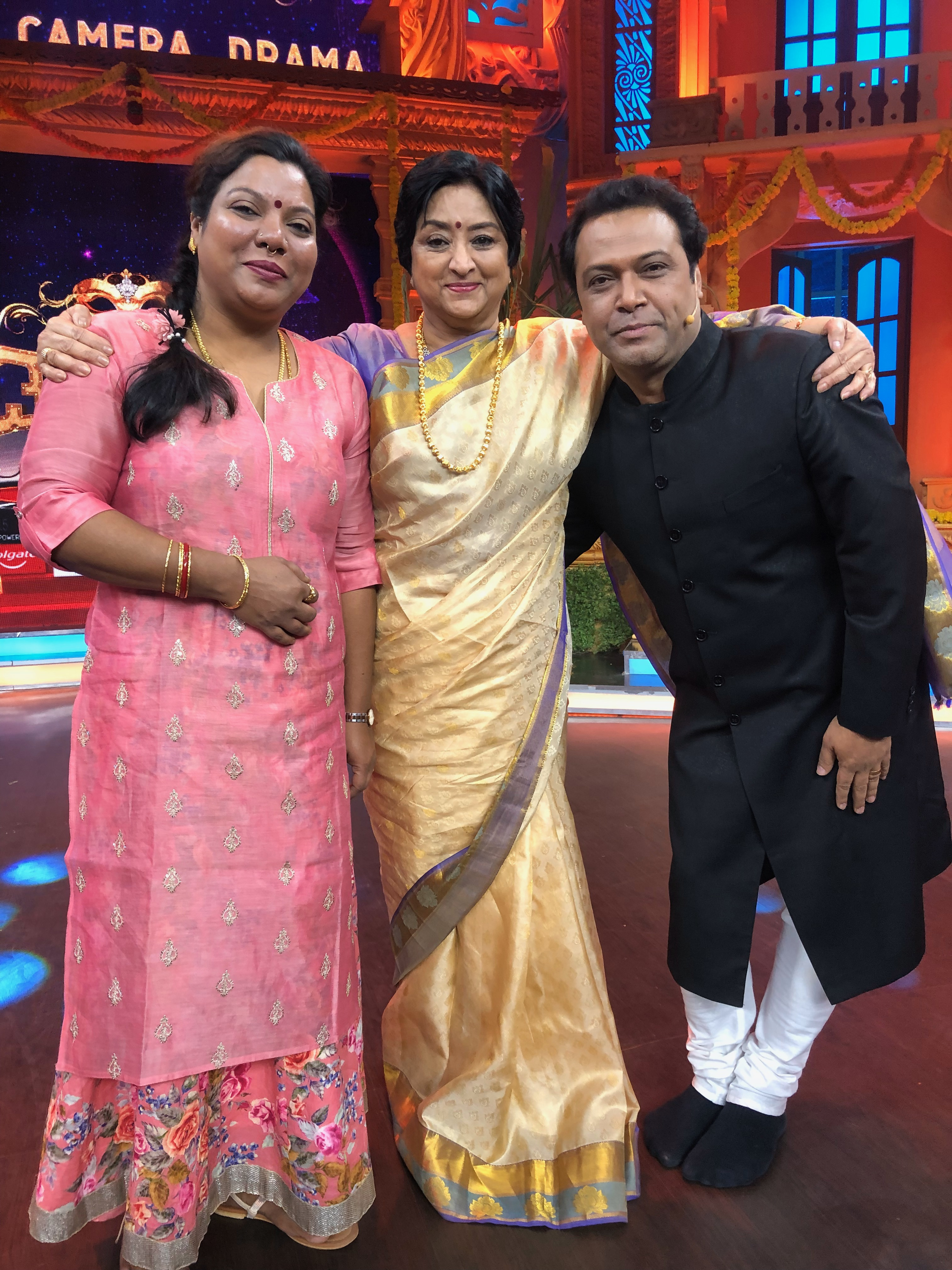
Lakshmi with Syed Sallauddin Pasha at a show

Lakshmi debuted with the 1968 Kannada film Goa Dalli CID 999. She established herself as a successful and popular actress in South India in the 1970s, acting in all four South Indian languages: Kannada, Malayalam, Tamil and Telugu. Lakshmi rose to fame with her first Malayalam movie Chattakari (1974), which won her the Kerala State Film Award for Best Actress. This has the distinction of being the first Malayalam film to run continuously for 40 weeks in a Bangalore theatre. Chattakari (1974) was remade in Hindi as Julie (1975) and in Telugu as Miss Julie Prema Katha (1975). In addition to a Filmfare Best Actress Award, she also won the Bengal Film Journalists' Association Awards for the "most outstanding work of the year", for her work in Julie. She is known for her versatility as an actress and for the glamorous outlook she embodied. Her acting in the Telugu film Panthulamma is often credited as one of her best performances.

After the success of her debut Malayalam film Chattakari, she starred in many other films in Malayalam. She won Filmfare Awards for Best Actress for her performances in Chalanum and Mohiniyaattam.

She is the only actress to have played daughter, sister, love interest and wife to Sivaji Ganesan, and even her mother has acted heroine opposite him and has acted with almost all the leading actors and stars of South India, but it was her combination with famous Kannada star Anant Nag in the 70s and 80s that struck a chord with the audience. Nag and Lakshmi are considered one of the all-time greatest pairs in South Indian cinema. They acted together in 10-12 films. Their pair was considered best-looking and the right recipe for success. Some of these films were based on TaRaSu novels and dealt with the lives of married middle-class couples.

After her success in Julie, Lakshmi didn't star in many Hindi films and instead concentrated on doing more South Indian films. She won the National Film Award for Best Actress for Sila Nerangalil Sila Manithargal (1977), becoming one of the first South Indian actresses to win that category for a Tamil film. When her career as a leading lady ended in the 1980s, she started playing supporting roles as a mother and later as a grandmother. She played Aishwarya Rai's grandmother in the Tamil musical blockbuster film, Jeans (1998) and Kareena Kapoor's grandmother in the hit film, Hulchul (2004).

She has performed in more than 400 films and has also been involved in politics.

Under K. Balachander's supervision, she made her directorial debut with a remake of Yours, Mine and Ours: the Kannada film Makkala Sainya (1980 Tamil version Mazhalai Pattalam).

Lakshmi is fluent in all four South Indian languages. She took a break from acting to host two talk shows, including the Tamil talk show Achamillai, Achamillai.She hosted a talk show in Kannada for Suvarna channel called Idu Kathe Alla Jeevana. She also hosts a talk show in Tamil for Vijay TV called Kadhai Alla Nijam. She has hosted a talk show in Kannada for Suvarna channel called Neena? Naana? After the shows ended, she returned to acting in films.

Currently she is on the judges' panel for the Malayalam reality show Champions on Surya TV. She is also a judge for a Kannada reality show called Drama Juniors on Zee Kannada. She has overall appeared in over 650 films across languages as confirmed on the popular Kannada show Weekend with Ramesh on Zee Kannada.

== Personal life ==
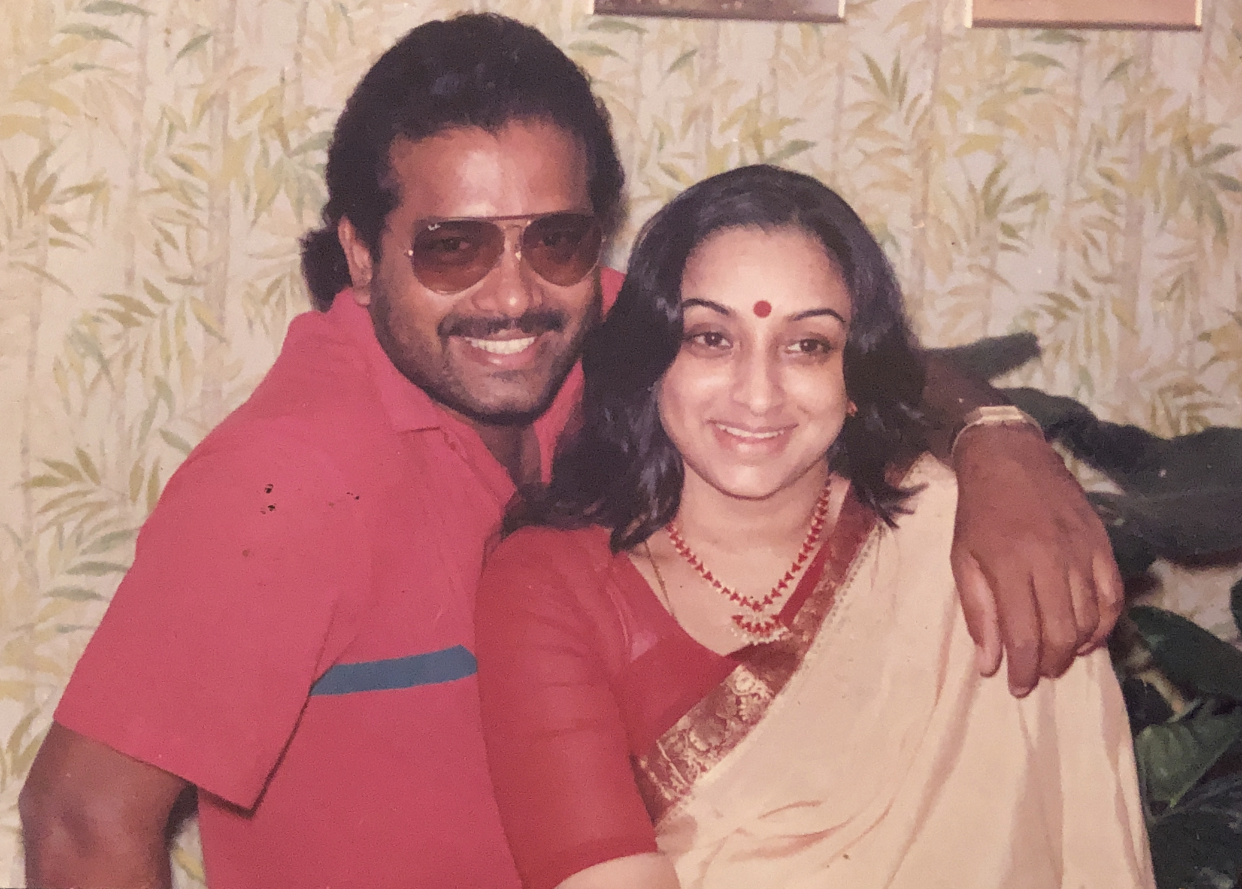
Lakshmi with her husband Sivachandran

Lakshmi's first marriage was with Bhaskaran with whom she has a daughter, actress Aishwariyaa Bhaskaran. They later got divorced.

Her second marriage was with co-star Mohan Sharma on the sets of Chattakari (1975) and ended in divorce (1980).

While she was shooting En Uyir Kannamma (1988) she and actor-director M. Sivachandran fell in love and got married (1987). The couple adopted a girl named Samyuktha in 2000.

== Awards ==
=== National Film Awards ===
- 1977 – National Film Award for Best Actress for Sila Nerangalil Sila Manithargal

=== Filmfare Awards ===
- 1976 – Filmfare Award for Best Actress for Julie

=== Filmfare Awards South ===
- 1974 – Filmfare Award for Best Tamil Actress for Dikkatra Parvathi
- 1974 – Filmfare Award for Best Malayalam Actress for Chattakari
- 1975 – Filmfare Award for Best Malayalam Actress for Chalanum
- 1976 – Filmfare Award for Best Malayalam Actress for Mohiniyaattam
- 1978 - Filmfare Special Jury Award for Oru Nadigai Natakam Parkiral & Panthulamma
- 1983 – Filmfare Award for Best Tamil Actress for Unmaigal
- 1986 – Filmfare Award for Best Telugu Actress for Sravana Meghalu
- 1993 – Filmfare Award for Best Kannada Actress for Hoovu Hannu
- 1998 – Filmfare Lifetime Achievement Award (South)

=== Cinema Express Awards ===
- 1986 – Cinema Express Award for Best Actress – Tamil for Samsaram Adhu Minsaram

Nandi Awards

- Best Actress - Panthulamma (1977)
- Best Actress - Sravana Meghalu (1986)
- Best Character Actress - Murari (2001)
- Special Jury Award - Mithunam (2012)

=== Karnataka State Film Awards ===
- 1993 – Best Actress for Hoovu Hannu
- 2008 – Best Supporting Actress for Vamshi
- 2017 – Dr. Rajkumar Award (Highest honor in the Kannada Film Industry).

=== Tamil Nadu State Film Awards ===
- 1978 – Tamil Nadu State Film Award for Best Actress for Oru Nadigai Naatakam Paarkiraal

=== Kerala State Film Awards ===
- 1974 – Kerala State Film Award for Best Actress for Chattakari

=== Bengal Film Journalists Association Awards ===
- 1975 - Most outstanding work of the year for Julie

=== South India International Movie Awards ===
- 2021 – SIIMA Award for Best Actress in a Supporting Role for Oh! Baby
- 2026 – SIIMA Lifetime Achievement Award

== Notable filmography ==
=== Tamil ===
List of Lakshmi Tamil film credits
Year	Title	Role	Notes
1968	Jeevanaamsam	Lalitha	
1969	Kanni Penn		
1969	Kaaval Dheivam	Gokila	
1969	Annaiyum Pithavum		
1969	Mannippu	Bama	
1969	Paalkudam		
1969	Magane Nee Vazhga		
1970	Maattukara Velan	Kamala Nagalingam	
1970	Jeevanadi		
1970	Ethiroli	Kalpana	
1970	Kannan Varuvan		
1970	Maanavan		
1970	Navagraham	Vatchala	
1970	Penn Deivam	Ponnamma's daughter	
1970	Veetukku Veedu	Malathi	
1970	Yaen?	Kamala	
1971	Nootrukku Nooru	Lakshmi	
1971	Thangaikaga	Radha/Amutha	
1971	Thirumagal	Radha	
1971	Arunodhayam	Nirmala	
1971	Uyir		
1971	Kumari Kottam	Uma	
1971	Thulli Odum Pulliman		
1972	Kasethan Kadavulada	Rama	
1972	Aseervatham		
1972	Kanimuthu Paappa		
1972	Karunthel Kannayiram		
1972	Dhikku Theriyadha Kaattil		
1972	Puguntha Veedu		
1972	Pillaiyo Pillai		
1972	Agathiyar	Kaveri	
1972	Ponmagal Vanthal		
1972	Idhaya Veenai	Nalini	
1972	Nawab Narkali	Kanchana	
1972	Rani Yar Kuzhandhai		
1972	Sange Muzhangu	Ladha	
1973	Rajaraja Cholan	Princess Kundavai	
1973	Karaikkal Ammaiyar	Punithavathi	
1973	Arangetram	Cameo as herself	
1973	Thirumalai Deivam	Goddess Padmavati	
1973	Prarthanai		
1973	Thalai Prasavam		
1973	Thedi Vandha Lakshmi	Lakshmi	
1973	Vijaya		
1974	Dikkatra Parvathi	Parvathi	Filmfare Award for Best Actress – Tamil
1974	Naan Avanillai	Salima	
1974	Thirumangalyam	Lavanya	
1974	Akkarai Pachai		
1974	Magalukkaga		
1974	Kanmani Raja	Janaki	
1974	Prayachittham		
1974	Tiger Thaathachari		
1975	Swaami Ayyappan	Mohini	
1975	Pinju Manam		
1976	Seervarisai		
1976	Unakkaga Naan		
1976	Vazhvu En Pakkam	Saraswathi/Usha	
1977	Thoondil Meen		
1977	Sila Nerangalil Sila Manithargal	Ganga	National Film Award for Best Actress
1977	Oruvannukku Oruthi		
1977	Punitha Anthoniyar		
1978	Oru Nadigai Natakam Parkiral	Kalyani	Tamil Nadu State Film Award for Best Actress
1978	Thyagam	Radha	
1978	Achchani		
1979	Dhairyalakshmi		
1979	Nangooram		
1979	Vallavan Varugiran		
1980	Polladhavan	Seetha	
1980	Avan Aval Adhu		
1980	Soundaryame Varuga Varuga		
1980	Mazhai Pattalam		
1981	Netrikan	Meenakshi	
1981	Kudumbam Oru Koyil		
1981	Savaal	Ganga	
1981	Thillu Mullu	Cameo	
1981	Vaa Indha Pakkam		
1982	Nenjangal		
1983	Unmaigal		Filmfare Award for Best Actress – Tamil
1983	Indru Nee Nalai Naan		
1983	Thandikapatta Nyayangal		
1983	Nenjodu Nenjam		
1984	Sirai	Bhagirathi	
1984	Nee Thodumbothu		
1984	Nenjathai Allitha		
1985	Sri Raghavendrar	Saraswati Bai	
1985	Udhaya Geetham	Leela Chowdhry	
1985	Anthasthu		
1985	Oru Malarin Payanam		
1985	Thavam		
1986	Samsaram Adhu Minsaram	Uma	Cinema Express Award for Best Actress – Tamil
1986	Kodai Mazhai		
1986	Anandha Kanneer	Parvatham	
1986	Enakku Nane Needipathi	Gowri	
1986	Kanmaniye Pesu		
1986	Neethana Antha Kuyil		
1986	Palaivana Rojakkal	Surya	
1987	Sirai Paravai		
1987	Kudumbam Oru Koyil		
1987	Dampathyam		
1987	Evargal Indiyargal		
1987	Mupperum Deviyar		
1987	Thalidhaanam		
1988	Kaalaiyum Neeye Maalaiyum Neeye		
1988	Paasa Paravaigal	Mrs. Anandhi Sukumar, Advocate	
1988	Adhu Antha Kaalam		
1988	En Uyir Kannamma		
1988	Kadarkarai Thaagam		
1988	Ratha Dhanam		
1988	Thambi Thanga Kambi	Ganga (Kaveri)	
1989	Ore Oru Gramathiley	Gayathri alias Karuppayi	
1990	Nyayangal Jayikkattum	Saraswathi	
1990	Naanum Indha Ooruthan		
1991	Maanagara Kaaval	Rupavathy, the Prime Minister of India	
1991	Rudhra	Lalitha	
1992	Jodi Senthachu		
1992	Sir... I Love You	Veni	
1993	Enga Thambi	Shanthi	
1994	Athiradi Padai	Chithra IAS	
1994	Kanmani	Kanmani's mother	
1994	Pattukottai Periyappa	Jhansi	
1995	Periya Kudumbam	Kasthuri	
1995	Mr. Madras	Murugan's mother	
1996	Musthaffaa	Bhagyalakshmi	
1996	Ilamai Rojakkal		
1997	Vallal	Durairasu's sister	
1998	Moovendhar	Sivagami	
1998	Veera Thalattu	Pandian's adopted mother	
1998	Jeans	Krishnaveny Paatty	
1998	Iniyavale	Prabakharan's mother, Lakshmi	
1998	Murattu Kadhal		
1998	Thalaimurai		
1999	Padayappa	Padayappa's mother	
1999	Kannupada Poguthaiya	Parvathy	
1999	Manam Virumbuthe Unnai	Priya's mother	
2000	Kakkai Siraginilae	Savithri	
2000	Rhythm	Chithra's mother-in-law	
2000	Vaanavil	Jayalakshmi I.A.S	
2000	Snegithiye	Malathi	
2002	Dhaya	Mother Sharada	
2004	Vasool Raja MBBS	Janaki's mother	
2005	Ayya	Ayyadurai's wife	
2005	Kanda Naal Mudhal	Ramani	
2007	Naan Avanillai	Sarada	
2007	Vel	Vetrivel's grandmother	
2008	Karuvarai Pookkal		
2009	Unnaipol Oruvan	Chief Secretary of Tamil Nadu	
2015	Moone Moonu Varthai	Malini	

=== Telugu ===
List of Lakshmi Telugu film credits
Year	Title	Role	Notes
1968	Bandhavyalu	Lakshmi	
1968	Chuttarikalu	Lakshmi	
1969	Karpura Harathi	Rani	
1969	Mahabaludu		
1970	Mayani Mamata	Leela	
1970	Oke Kutumbham	Mary	
1970	Maa Aavida Collector	Akka garu	
1971	Suputhrudu	Madhavi	
1971	Nindu Dampathulu	Vani	
1972	Koduku Kodalu	Julie	
1972	Marapurani Thalli		
1972	Abbaigaru Ammaigaru		
1973	Jeevana Tharangalu	Lavanya	
1973	Devudamma	Lakshmi/Rita	Dual Role
1973	Palletoori Bava	Lalitha	
1973	Kanna Koduku	Bharathi	
1973	Puttinillu Mettinillu		Remake of Tamil film Puguntha Veedu (1972)
1974	Manushulu Mattibommalu		
1974	Andaru Dongale	Lakshmi	
1974	Kode Nagu		
1974	Bangaaru Kalalu	Jyothi	
1975	Ammayila Sapatham	Chithra	
1975	Babu		
1975	Devudu Chesina Pelli		
1975	Vayasochchina Pilla		
1976	Bangaru Manishi	Geetha	
1977	Eetharam Manishi	Saroja Devi	
1978	Panthulamma	Sharada	Filmfare Special Award – SouthNandi Award for Best Actress
1978	Mallepoovu		
1981	Bhavi Powrulu		
1981	Pandanti Jeevitham		
1981	Chattaniki Kallu Levu	Inspector Durga	
1982	Raaga Deepam	Gowri	
1982	Korukunna Mogudu	Parvathi	
1982	Bandhalu Anubandhalu		
1983	Prema Murthulu		
1983	Mugguru Monagallu		
1983	Poratam		
1986	Sravana Megalu		Filmfare Award for Best Actress – Telugu; Nandi Award for Best Actress
1986	Brahma Rudrulu	Sujatha	
1986	Ravana Brahma	Geeta	
1987	Ananda Thandavam		
1990	Ghatana		
1992	Pranadaata	Kamala	
1992	Public Rowdy		
1992	Doshi		
1993	Paruvu Prathishta	Parvathi	
1993	Nippu Ravva	SP	
1993	Repati Rowdy	Janaki	
1994	Andaru Andare		
1994	Todi Kodalli	Syamla	
1994	O Thandri O Koduku		
1995	Alluda Majaka	Vasundhara	
1995	Madhya Taragathi Maha Bharatham		
1996	Ninne Pelladata	Mahalakshmi	
1997	Abbai Gari Pelli		
1997	Aaro Pranam		
1997	Super Heroes		
1997	Priya O Priya	Vasundhara	
1997	Muddula Mogudu	Sakunthala Devi	
1998	Premante Idera	Murali's mother	
1998	Pelli Kanuka	Ganga	
1999	Bobbili Vamsam		
2001	Murari	Gopakka	Nandi Award for Best Character Actress
2001	Preminchu	Kousalya	
2001	Chiranjeevulu		
2002	Lahiri Lahiri Lahirilo	Achchamamba	
2002	Prudhvi Narayana	Laxmi	
2004	Sakhiya	Durga Devi	
2008	Chintakayala Ravi	Seshamba chintakayala	
2009	Eenadu	Chief Secretary	Nominated – Filmfare Award for Best Supporting Actress – Telugu
2012	Midhunam	Buchchi Lakshmi	Nandi Special Jury Award
2015	Moodu Mukkallo Cheppalante	Malini	
2019	Oh! Baby	Savitri/Bebakka/Baby	
2019	Manmadhudu 2	Sam's mother	
2019	Gang Leader	Saraswathi	
2023	Kushi	Aradhya's Paternal Grandmother	

=== Malayalam ===
List of Lakshmi Malayalam film credits
Year	Title	Role	Notes
1974	Chattakari	Julie	Filmfare Award for Best Actress – Malayalam; Kerala State Film Award for Best Actress
1975	Picnic	Maala	
1975	Prayanam	Savithri	
1975	Sindhu	Sindhu	Remake of Tamil film Puguntha Veedu (1972)
1975	Chattambikkalyaani	Kalyani	
1975	Chalanum	Pavizham	Filmfare Award for Best Actress – Malayalam
1975	Swami Ayappan	Mohini	
1975	Chuvanna Sandhyakal	Ragini	
1975	Raagam	Sreedevi	
1975	Ullasa Yaathra		
1976	Mohiniyaattam	Mohini	Filmfare Award for Best Actress – Malayalam
1976	Ponni	Ponni	
1976	Ajayanum Vijayanum	Nandini	
1976	Missi	-	
1976	Priyamvada		
1976	Surveykkallu		
1977	Sneha Yamuna	-	
1977	Agninakshathram	Tessy	
1977	Mohavum Mukthiyum	-	
1977	Akshayapaathram	-	
1977	Kaduvaye Pidicha Kiduva	-	
1977	Chila Nerangalil Chila Manushyar		
1978	Iniyum Puzhayozhukum	Celeine	
1978	Vyaamoham	-	
1978	Anthonees Punyavaalan		
1978	Simhaasanam	Narayani	
1980	Rajaneegandhi	Sumathy	
1981	Orikkal Koodi	Devayani	
1981	Anthiveyilile Ponnu	Maya	
1981	Vida Parayum Munpe	Sudha	
1982	Sindoora Sandhyakku Mounam	Deepthi	
1982	Padayottam	Parvathi	
1982	Preeyasakhi Radha	Radha	
1982	Lady Teacher		
1982	Gaanam	Rukmini	
1983	Thaalam Thettiya Tharattu	Adv. Rajalakshmi	
1983	Karyam Nissaram	Ammini Kutty	
1983	America America	Radha	
1983	Attakkalasam	Indu	
1983	Bandham	Thulasi/Sarasi	
1983	Aaroodam	Indira	
1983	Nathi Muthal Nathi Vare	Naseema	
1983	Aadhipathyam	Vilasini	
1983	Sandhya Vandanam	Mini	
1984	Piriyilla Naam	Lakshmi Menon	
1984	Arante Mulla Kochu Mulla	Maheswariyamma	
1984	Aattuvanchi Ulanjappol	Prameela	
1984	Ningalil Oru Sthree	Renuka	
1984	Vepraalam	Rajalakshmi	
1985	Choodatha Pookal	Hema	
1985	Vannu Kandu Keezhadakki	Padmavathi	
1988	Daisy	Malathy Menon	
1990	Ee Thanutha Veluppan Kalathu	Sreedevi Rosario	
1990	Kshanakkathu	Devaki Nair	
1992	Bharatham	Ramani	
1992	Poochakkaru Mani Kettum	Kunjukuttiyamma	
1994	Manathe Vellitheru	Yasodhamma	
1994	Gamanam	Bhanumathi	
1994	Pathavi		
2007	Raakilipattu	Malathy Menon	
2007	Veeralipattu	Hari's grandmother	
2009	IG	Dhurga Prasad's Mother	
2010	Pramani	Rosy Teacher	
2014	Ormayundo Ee Mukham	Gautham's grandmother	

=== Kannada ===
List of Lakshmi Kannada film credits
Year	Title	Role	Notes
1968	Goa Dalli CID 999	Veena	
1976	Naa Ninna Mareyalare	Usha	
1977	Olavu Geluvu	Rohini	
1978	Kiladi Jodi	Jenny/ Radha	Dual roles
1979	Naa Ninna Bidalaare	Gayatri	
1979	Nanobba Kalla	Rukmini	
1979	Chandanada Gombe	Ratna	
1980	Dhairyalakshmi	Lakshmi	
1980	Ravichandra	Shanti	
1981	Antha	Sunitha	
1981	Bhoomige Banda Bhagavantha	Ganga	
1981	Avala Hejje	Seetha	
1981	Gaali Maathu	Gowri	
1981	Etu Eduretu	Pushpa	
1982	Tony	Jyothi	
1983	Pallavi Anu Pallavi	Anu	
1983	Makkale Devaru	Shanti	
1983	Mududida Tavare Aralithu	Madhu	
1983	Benkiya Bale	Rukmini	
1983	Nodi Swamy Navirodu Hige	Aparna	Special appearance
1983	Ibbani Karagithu	Manasa	
1984	Makkaliralavva Mane Thumba	Usharani	
1984	Thaliya Bhagya	Radha	
1984	Gandu Bherunda	Champa	
1984	Olavu Moodidaga	Bharathi	
1985	Bidugadeya Bedi	Gowri	
1985	Brahmastra	Tunga	
1985	Sedina Hakki	Anitha / Gowri	
1985	Shwetha Gulabi		Special appearance
1986	Nannavaru		
1987	Onde Goodina Hakkigalu	Kaveri	
1987	Sowbhagya Lakshmi	Sowbhagya	
1987	Prema Kadambari	Seetha	
1988	Dharma Pathni	Lakshmi	
1988	Mathru Vathsalaya	Seetha / Indu	Dual roles
1988	Nanna Avesha		
1989	Hosa Kavya	Ganga	
1989	Bangaarada Baduku		
1990	Lion Jagapathi Rao	Janaki	
1991	Bombay Daada	Viji	
1992	Gruhalakshmi	Parvati	
1993	Hoovu Hannu	Ramabai	Filmfare Award for Best Actress – Kannada Karnataka State Film Award for Best Actress
1993	Kumkuma Bhagya	Janaki	
1993	Rayara Maga	Janaki	
1993	Jaga Mechida Huduga	Bhavani	
1993	Sri Durga Pooje		
1994	Love 94	Sharada	
1995	Baalondu Chaduranga		
1995	Sathya Jwale		
1996	Hetthavaru	Gowri	
1997	Maduve	Roopa's mother-in-law	
1998	Preethsod Thappa	Mahalakshmi	
1999	Surya Vamsha	Sathyamurthy's wife	
2001	Amma		
2001	Diggajaru		
2002	Prema	Prema's mother	
2007	Hethare Hennanne Herabeku		
2008	Vamshi	Vamshi's mother	Karnataka State Film Award for Best Supporting Actress
2009	Buddhivantha	Pooja's mother	
2010	Jothegara	Annapoorna	
2015	Sharp Shooter		
2015	Vamshodharaka		
2017	Eradane Sala	Dhanu's mother	
2017	Saheba		
2022	Trikona	Parvati	
2025	Rajadrohi	Kaveramma / Annapurnamma	

=== Hindi ===
List of Lakshmi Hindi film credits
Year	Title	Role	Notes
1975	Julie	Julie	Filmfare Award for Best Actress
1977	Jeevan Mukt		
1977	Charandas	Lalli	
1979	Aangan Ki Kali	Sunita	
1981	Kahani Ek Chor Ki	Geeta	
1998	Jeans	Krishnaveni	
2004	Hulchul	Laxmi Devi	

== TV serials ==
- Adutha Veetu Kavithai
- Nallathor Veenai
- Mahalakshmi

== Web series ==
List of Lakshmi web series credits
Year	Title	Role	Language	Channel	Notes
2023	Sweet Kaaram Coffee	Sundari	Tamil	Amazon Prime Video	

== TV shows ==
- Kannadada Kotyadhipati as Contestant (Kannada)
- Kadhai Alla Nijam reality show in Vijay TV (Tamil)
- Neena Naana as Host (Kannada)
- Champions as Judge (Kannada)
- Drama Juniors as Judge (Kannada)
- Kathe Alla Jeevana (Kannada)
