= Ulagam Pirandhadhu Enakkaga =

- Theatrical release poster
- Directed by: S. P. Muthuraman
- Written by: Chithralaya Gopu
- Produced by: M. Saravanan; M. Balasubramaniam
- Starring: Sathyaraj; Gautami; Rupini; Saranya
- Cinematography: T. S. Vinayagan
- Edited by: R. Vittal; C. Lancy
- Music by: R. D. Burman (songs); S. P. Balasubrahmanyam (BGM)
- Production company: AVM Productions
- Release date: 14 April 1990
- Running time: 142 minutes
- Country: India
- Language: Tamil

Ulagam Pirandhadhu Enakkaga (transl. The world was born for me) is a 1990 Indian Tamil-language action comedy film, directed by S. P. Muthuraman and produced by M. Saravanan and Balasubramanian. The film stars Sathyaraj, Gautami, Rupini and Saranya. It was released on 14 April 1990, and art director Salam won the Tamil Nadu State Film Award for Best Art Director.

== Plot ==
Raja is a rich person who returns to India from the United States. He gets surprised when most of them call him by different names and later he sees another lookalike of himself, Quarter Govindan, who is a jobless man and wants to earn money for his sister's life. Raja's cousin Renu is waiting for Raja to marry her. However he is not showing any interest. Raja requests Quarter Govindan to pretend like him so that he will be able to find his enemies. Quarter Govindan starts loving Renu, and she becomes very happy.

== Cast ==
- Sathyaraj as Raja and Quarter Govindan
- Gautami as Jimikki
- Rupini as Renu, Rich girl and uncle daughter of Sathyaraj, love interest of Govind.
- Saranya as Quarter Govindan sister
- Srividya as Quarter Govindan mother
- Cho Ramaswamy as Raja's father
- Goundamani as Sutthi Josiyar
- Senthil
- Manorama as Raja's mother
- Disco Shanthi
- Lalitha Kumari
- K. S. Jayalakshmi
- Padma
- Jai Ganesh
- Dileep
- Rami Reddy (voice dubbed by Nassar)
- Chinni Jayanth
- Charle
- Loose Mohan
- Oru Viral Krishna Rao
- Typist Gopu
- Kumarimuthu
- Kullamani

== Soundtrack ==
The songs were composed by R. D. Burman and the background music score by S. P. Balasubrahmanyam, with lyrics by Vairamuthu. The song "Thiruttu Poonai Eruttu Velai" reuses the tune of the song "Reshmi Zulfen Nashili Aankhen" from Indrajeet.

Song	Singers	Length
"Adada Vayasupulla Adiyedutha"	S. P. Balasubrahmanyam, Kavita Krishnamurthy	05:59
"Nee Azhutha Kanneer Mazhaiyachu"	S. P. Balasubrahmanyam	06:10
"Thalli Thalli Pogum Ponnaiya"	Asha Bhosle	04:24
"Thannee Vandi Thannee Vandi"	S. P. Balasubrahmanyam	05:28
"Thiruttu Poonai Eruttu Velai"	S. P. Balasubrahmanyam, Asha Bhosle	06:57
"Ulagam Piranthathu Enakkaga"	S. P. Balasubrahmanyam	04:32

== Reception ==
P. S. S. of Kalki called it a film that has been cleverly made in the pursuit of collection by catering to the weaknesses to be enjoyed.
