= Raththa Dhanam =

- Poster
- Directed by: Sivachandran
- Written by: Sivachandran
- Produced by: Sivachandran; Lakshmi
- Starring: Prabhu; Gautami; Sadhana; Lakshmi; Sivachandran
- Cinematography: Vishwam Natraj
- Edited by: B. Lenin; V. T. Vijayan
- Music by: Gangai Amaran
- Production company: Kavitha Chitra Films
- Release date: 10 September 1988
- Country: India
- Language: Tamil

Raththa Dhanam (transl. Blood Donation) is a 1988 Indian Tamil language film, directed by Sivachandran and produced by himself and Lakshmi. The film stars Prabhu, Gautami, Sadhana, Lakshmi and Sivachandran. It was released on 10 September 1988.

== Cast ==
- Prabhu
- Gautami
- Sadhana
- Lakshmi
- Sivachandran
- Jai Ganesh
- Delhi Ganesh
- Y. Vijaya
- Disco Shanthi
- Nizhalgal Ravi
- S. S. Chandran
- Pandu
- Chandrakanth
- Sivaji Manohar (debut)
- Chandrasekhar
- Prathap K. Pothan

== Soundtrack ==
Soundtrack was composed by Gangai Amaran.

No.	Title	Singer(s)	Length
1.	"Sayangalam Nangal"	S. P. Balasubrahmanyam, Deepan Chakravarthy, S. N. Surendar, Uma Ramanan
2.	"Neelu Konam"	Malaysia Vasudevan, K. S. Chithra
3.	"Koyilgalum"	S. P. Balasubrahmanyam, P. Susheela
4.	"Poonthegangal"	P. Susheela

== Reception ==
N. Krishnaswamy of The Indian Express wrote, "Sivachandran has tried every trick in the book to keep his film going – some of them gel and some don't but a bagful of tricks do not a good film make". Jayamanmadhan of Kalki criticised the film for not being entertaining enough.
