= Lalitha Kumari =

Indian actress

- Born: 29 September 1969 (age 56); Madras, Madras State, India
- Occupation: Actress
- Years active: 1987–1995
- Spouse: Prakash Raj (m. 1994; div. 2009)
- Children: 3
- Parents: C. L. Anandan; Lakshmi
- Relatives: Disco Shanti (sister); Jai Varma (brother)

Lalitha Kumari (born 18 May 1967) is an Indian actress who worked in Tamil films. She is the daughter of Tamil actor C. L. Anandan and the younger sister of actress Disco Shanti.

== Personal life ==
Lalitha Kumari married actor Prakash Raj in 1994 and the couple has two daughters and a son (who died in 2004). The couple have got divorced in 2009.

== Career life ==
Lalitha Kumari starred in many movies, alongside the likes of Goundamani, Senthil and other senior actors. She has also played major roles in films such as Manadhil Urudhi Vendum, Pudhu Pudhu Arthangal, Pulan Visaranai and Sigaram. Lalitha Kumari has performed around 30 films and has made her mark in the Tamil film industry. In 1995, after her marriage to actor Prakash Raj, Kumari left the film industry.

She made her re-entry into Kollywood and South Indian cinema in the Tamil movie Muriyadi, playing the wife of Sathyaraj's character. However the film was, and as of July 2022 still is, shelved and delayed for unknown reasons.

== Partial filmography ==
Year	Film	Role	Notes
1987	Manadhil Urudhi Vendum	Vasu	
1988	Veedu Manaivi Makkal		
1988	Poo Pootha Nandavanam		
1989	Pudhu Pudhu Arthangal	Jolly's wife	
1989	Mappillai	Dilip lover	
1990	Pulan Visaranai	Kasthuri	
1990	Aarathi Edungadi		
1990	Ulagam Pirandhadhu Enakkaga		
1990	Neengalum Herothan	Rani	
1990	Madurai Veeran Enga Saami		
1990	Pathimoonam Number Veedu	Rekha / Ghost	
1991	Sigaram		
1992	Pokkiri Thambi	Maruthu's sister	
1993	Parvathi Ennai Paradi		
1993	Vedan		
1995	Karnaa	Chellamma	
1995	Marumagan	Kannamma	
1995	Nadodi Mannan	Kuyil Aatha	
