= Sivachandran =

Indian film actor, director, and writer

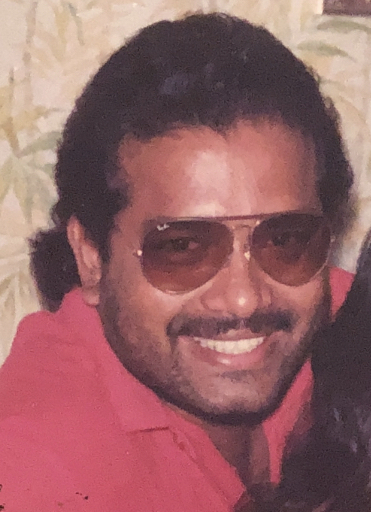
- Sivachandran in 1987
- Born: Narayanan; 1953 (age 72–73); Valparai, Tamil Nadu, India
- Occupations: Actor, director, writer
- Years active: 1976–1999; 2007–2010
- Spouse: Lakshmi (m. 1987)
- Children: 1 (adopted)

Narayanan, better known by his stage name Sivachandran, is an Indian actor, director, and writer who was active in Tamil cinema mostly in the 1980s.

== Career ==
Sivachandran was originally offered to act in Kizhakke Pogum Rail (1978), but declined. He made his film debut in Pattina Pravesam (1977) as one of the lead actors although Moondru Mudichu (1976), which was simultaneously shot with Pattina Pravesam was released first. He later starred in Annapoorani (1978) with R. Muthuraman in a negative role. He went on to star in notable films include Aval Appadithan (1978) and Polladhavan (1980). He made his directorial debut with En Uyir Kannamma (1988) and went on to direct several films with Prabhu.

== Personal life ==
Sivachandran was born as Narayanan, in Valparai, in Coimbatore district. He changed his name to Sivachandran and started his acting career. The stage name is a portmanteau of "Siva" from Sivaji Ganesan and "Chandran" from M. G. Ramachandran.

Sivachandran fell in love with actress Lakshmi on the sets of the film En Uyir Kannamma. Both of them got married in 1987. He collaborated with Lakshmi again in Raththa Dhanam (1988) and Jodi Sendhachu (1992), which was directed by Lakshmi herself. Sivachandran and Lakshmi adopted a girl, Samyuktha, in 2000.

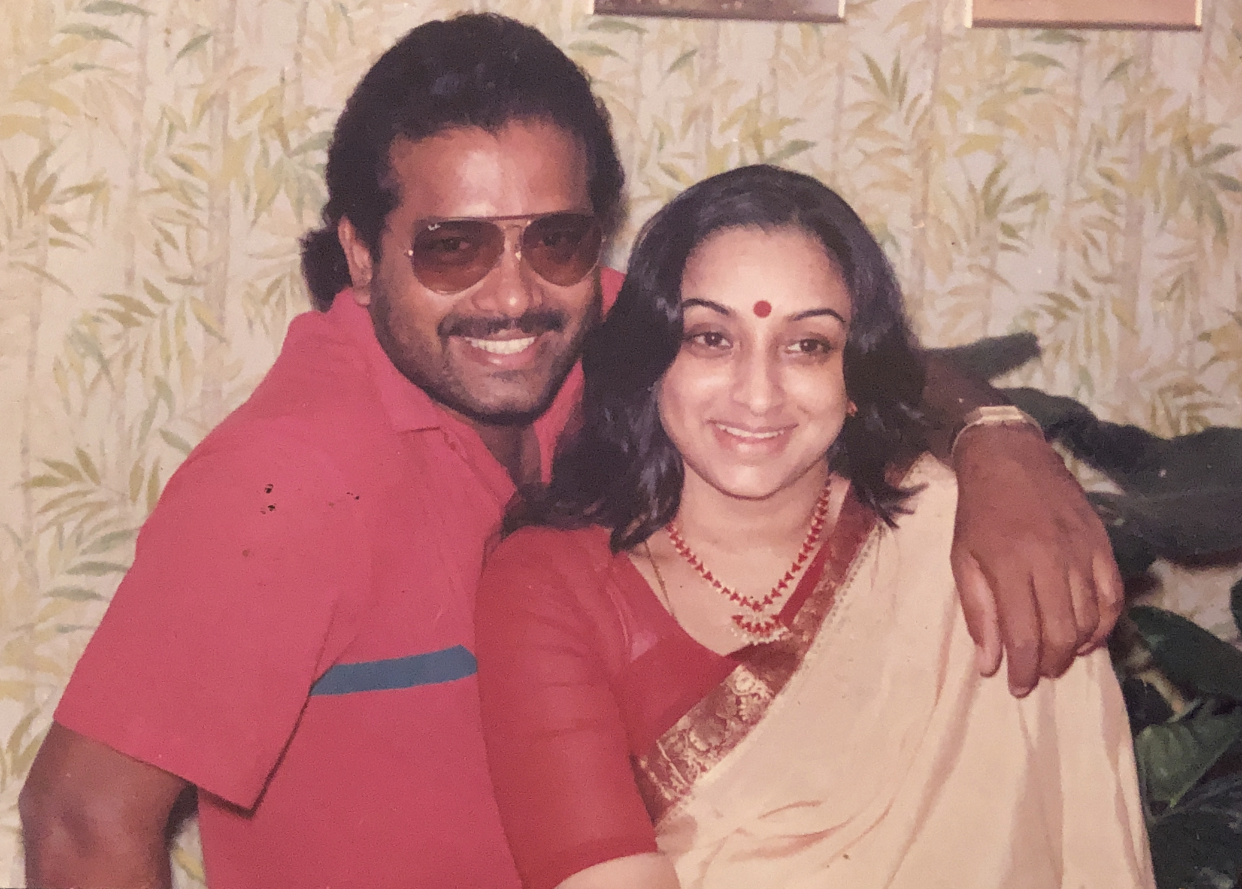
Sivachandran with his wife Lakshmi

== Filmography ==
=== As actor ===
Films

Year	Film	Role	Notes	Ref.
1976	Moondru Mudichu	Stage poet		
1977	Pattina Pravesam	Kumaran		
1978	Aval Appadithan	Mano		
1978	Annapoorani			
1979	Rosappu Ravikkaikari	Manickam		
1979	Pancha Kalyani			
1979	Poonthalir			
1979	Nee Sirithal Naan Sirippen			
1980	Thunive Thozhan			
1980	Mangala Nayagi			
1980	Natchathiram			
1980	Soundaryame Varuga Varuga			
1980	Vandichakkaram	Sarathi		
1980	Polladhavan	Chandru		
1981	Ram Lakshman	Kumar		
1981	Rani Theni	Sekhar		
1981	Nellikani			
1981	Nenjil Oru Mull			
1982	Anandha Ragam			
1982	Parvaiyin Marupakkam	Siva		
1982	Kaduvulluku Oru Kadidham			
1982	Antha Rathirikku Satchi Illai			
1982	Simla Special	Thief		
1983	Vellai Roja	Chinna Durai		
1983	Sivappu Sooriyan	Siva		
1983	Thandikkappatta Nyayangal			
1984	Rajathanthiram	Gajendran		
1984	Anbe Odi Vaa			
1984	Ezhuthatha Sattangal			
1984	Andha June 16-Am Naal			
1984	Naanayam Illatha Naanayam	Chidambaram		
1984	Antha Uravukku Satchi			
1984	Oh Maane Maane	Joseph		
1984	Naalai Unathu Naal	Vivekananthan (Prakash)		
1984	Vamsa Vilakku	Ravi		
1985	Navagraha Nayagi			
1985	Naam Iruvar	Chelladurai		
1985	Needhiyin Nizhal	Sukumar		
1985	Pudhiya Sagaptham	Manager Chandran		
1985	Thendral Thodhata Malar			
1985	Thanga Mama 3D			
1985	Ketti Melam	Marappa Devar		
1986	December Pookal			
1986	Poi Mugangal			
1986	Murattu Karangal	Rahman		
1986	Annai En Deivam	Kuzhandhai		
1986	Oru Iniya Udhayam	Siva		
1987	Kadamai Kanniyam Kattupaadu			
1987	Mangai Oru Gangai			
1987	Kavalan Avan Kovalan	Himself	Guest appearance	
1987	Oorkavalan	DSP		
1987	Anand	Manohar	Also dialogue writer	
1988	En Uyir Kannamma	Madhavan	Also director	
1988	Raththa Dhanam		Also director	
1990	Nyayangal Jayikkattum	Victor Raj	Also director	
1992	Jodi Sendhachu			
1995	Kattumarakaran	Vijay Raghavan		

Television

Year	Title	Channel	Role
2002–2004	Udhayam	Sun TV	Ramakrishnan
2007–2008	Arasi	Sun TV	Karthikeyan
2010	Mahalakshmi	Kalaignar TV	Rajashekar

=== As director ===
- En Uyir Kannamma (1988)
- Raththa Dhanam (1988)
- Hosa Kavya (1989; Kannada)
- Nyayangal Jayikkattum (1990)
- Satya Jwale (1995; Kannada)
- Manam Virumbuthe Unnai (1999)

=== As story writer ===
- Anbe Odi Vaa (1984)
- Annai En Deivam (1986)
- Sankar Guru (1987)

=== As dialogue writer ===
- Anand (1987)
