= Aarathi Edungadi =

- Title card
- Directed by: Chandranath
- Written by: Chandranath; N. S. Rameshkannan (dialogues)
- Produced by: H.Murali
- Starring: Rahman; Khushbu
- Cinematography: K. Thangavelu
- Edited by: P. Mohanraj
- Music by: Shankar–Ganesh
- Production company: Murali Cine Arts
- Release date: 28 July 1990
- Running time: 129 minutes
- Country: India
- Language: Tamil

Aarathi Edungadi (transl. Do the arthi) is a 1990 Indian Tamil-language film directed by Chandranath and produced by H.Murali. It stars Rahman and Khushbu. The film was released on 28 July 1990.

== Plot ==
Meera is treated like a servant and tortured by her stepmother, Shakunthula. Her only friend is the family maid, Annamma. Shakunthala and her brother Narajan want to keep Meera under their control as all the wealth is in her name. They plot to marry her off to an easily controllable man to ensure their wealthy lifestyles aren't impacted. Kannan enters the home while running away from the police. He is a prisoner on death row. Shakuntala arranges for Meera to marry Kannan as she would always have the threat of the police to control him. It is only after the marriage she realizes that Kannan isn't who he claimed to be and the entire family is thrown into turmoil. Police officer Shankara is also pulled into the proceedings as he begins to investigate the years old death of Meera's father. Meera navigates through all the confusion in search of a happy life.

== Cast ==
- Rahman as Kannan
- Khushbu as Meera
- Vivek as Vivek
- Lalitha Kumari as Lali
- Jaishankar as Shankara
- Janagaraj as Kaaliyapatti Ramasamy
- Manorama as Annamma
- Sangeeta as Shakunthala
- Santhana Bharathi as Natarajan
- Sulakshana
- Kuladeivam Rajagopal
- Vijay Babu
- V. K. Ramasamy as VKR

== Soundtrack ==
Soundtrack was composed by Shankar–Ganesh and lyrics written by Vaali.

Track listing
No.	Title	Singer(s)	Length
1.	"Magarasi"	K. S. Chithra
2.	"Kudumi Ippo"	Malaysia Vasudevan, S. N. Surendar
3.	"Maman Adicharo"	K. S. Chithra
4.	"Androru Naal"	Arunmozhi, K. S. Chithra
5.	"Enna Satham"	K. S. Chithra

== Reception ==
The Indian Express wrote, "There can be nothing more heartwarming for naive film audience than seeing the underdog triumphing and this is Chandranath's trump card".
