= Disco Shanti =

Indian dancer and actress (born 1965)

- Born: Santha Kumari; 16 April 1965 (age 61); Madras, Tamil Nadu, India
- Occupation: Actress
- Years active: 1983–1997; 2004
- Spouse: Srihari (m. 1996; died 2013)
- Children: 3
- Parents: C. L. Anandan; Lakshmi
- Relatives: Lalitha Kumari (sister); Jai Varma (brother)

Santha Kumari (born 16 April 1965), widely known by her stage name Disco Shanti, is an Indian actress and dancer known for her performances in item numbers, particularly in South Indian cinema. She has appeared in over 900 films in multiple languages, including Tamil, Kannada, Telugu, Hindi, Malayalam, and Odia.

== Personal life ==
Disco Shanti is the daughter of Tamil actor C. L. Anandan, known for his roles in films such as Vijayapuri Veeran (1960) and Kaattumallika (1966). She has a younger sister, Lalitha Kumari, who is also an actress.

In 1996, she married Telugu actor Srihari and subsequently retired from the film industry. The couple had two sons and a daughter. Their daughter, Akshara, died at the age of four months. In her memory, the family established the Akshara Foundation, which states that it focuses on quality education for every child, accelerating conventional learning through accessible technology-based innovations for teachers and children. Additionally, they adopted four villages in Medchal district.

Srihari, who had been battling a liver ailment, died during the filming of R... Rajkumar (2013). He experienced dizziness on set and was rushed to a hospital, where he later died.

== Filmography ==
Year	Movie	Role	Language
1983	Vasanthame Varuga		Tamil
1985	Vellai Manasu		Tamil
1985	Udaya Geetham		Tamil
1985	Unnai Thedi Varuven		Tamil
1985	Saavi	Club dancer	Tamil
1985	Ketti Melam	Chinna Sethupathi's mistress	Tamil
1985	Kattukkulle Thiruvizha		Tamil
1985	Uyerthezhunelppu		Malayalam
1985	Aa Neram Alppa Dooram	Dancer	Malayalam
1985	Chidambara Rahasiyam	Aasha	Tamil
1986	Adutha Veedu		Tamil
1986	Marakka Matten		Tamil
1986	Sathkaara		Kannada
1986	Thatayya Kankanam		Telugu
1986	Murattu Karangal		Tamil
1986	Africadalli Sheela	Zeher - the dancer	Kannada
1986	Oomai Vizhigal		Tamil
1986	Nimishangal		Malayalam
1986	Dharma Devathai		Tamil
1987	Raja Mariyadhai		Tamil
1987	Kizhakku Africavil Sheela	Naagini - the dancer	Tamil
1987	Sheela		Hindi
1987	Mr. Raja		Kannada
1987	Veera Viharam		Telugu
1987	Kadhal Parisu		Tamil
1987	Nee Allenkil Njan	Dancer	Malayalam
1987	Huli Hebbuli		Kannada
1987	Jayasimha		Kannada
1987	Kavalan Avan Kovalan		Tamil
1987	Chellakutti		Tamil
1987	Aase		Kannada
1987	Kurukshetra		Kannada
1987	Sangrama		Kannada
1987	Paasam Oru Vesham		Tamil
1987	Ivargal Varungala Thoongal		Tamil
1987	Anthima Ghatta		Kannada
1988	Shakthi		Kannada
1988	Urimai Geetham		Tamil
1988	Gudugu Sidilu		Kannada
1988	Thayi Karulu		Kannada
1988	Oorigitta Kolli		Kannada
1988	Onnum Onnum Pathinettu		Malayalam
1988	Raasave Unnai Nambi		Tamil
1988	Nammoora Raja		Kannada
1988	Bharath		Kannada
1988	Donga Kollu		Telugu
1988	Manamagale Vaa		Tamil
1988	Gharwali Baharwali		Hindi
1988	Ullathil Nalla Ullam		Tamil
1988	Kazhugumalai Kallan		Tamil
1988	Anjada Gandu		Kannada
1988	Matru Devo Bhava		Kannada
1988	Thambi Thanga Kambi		Tamil
1988	Paatti Sollai Thattathe		Tamil
1988	Nallavan		Tamil
1988	Dharmathin Thalaivan		Tamil
1988	Sangliyana		Kannada
1988	Raththa Dhanam		Tamil
1988	Jamadagni		Telugu
1988	Kabzaa	Dancer	Hindi
1988	Arjun		Kannada
1988	Puthiya Vaanam		Tamil
1989	Pongi Varum Kaveri		Tamil
1989	Avatara Purusha		Kannada
1989	Idhayathai Thirudathe		Tamil
1989	Siva		Tamil
1989	Asmaan Se Ooncha	Guest Appearance	Hindi
1989	Malayathi Pennu		Malayalam
1989	Dharma Devan		Tamil
1989	Kalpana House		Tamil
1989	Dilli Babu		Tamil
1989	Geethanjali	Usha	Telugu
1989	Khuli Khidki	Reena	Hindi
1989	Moodu Manthiram		Tamil
1989	Nyayakkaagi Naanu		Kannada
1989	Naalai Manithan		Tamil
1989	Indrajith		Kannada
1989	CBI Shankar		Kannada
1989	Padma Vyuha		Kannada
1989	Hendthighelbedi	Shanti	Kannada
1989	Vetri Vizha		Tamil
1989	Paila Pachessu		Telugu
1989	Idu Saadhya		Kannada
1989	Nyaya Tharasu		Tamil
1989	Penn Buthi Pin Buthi		Tamil
1989	Samsarame Saranam		Tamil
1989	Hosa Kavya		Kannada
1989	Sondham 16		Tamil
1989	Vaai Kozhuppu		Tamil
1989	Onti Salaga		Kannada
1989	Kanoon Apna Apna	Dancer	Hindi
1989	Kasam Vardi Kee	Nisha	Hindi
1989	Vetri Vizha		Tamil
1989	Jayabheri		Kannada
1990	Idhaya Thamarai		Tamil
1990	Nammoora Hammeera		Kannada
1990	Kadathanadan Ambadi		Malayalam
1990	Ulagam Pirandhadhu Enakkaga		Tamil
1990	Ashwamedha	Dancer	Kannada
1990	Poli Kitty		Kannada
1990	Paattukku Naan Adimai		Tamil
1990	Sandhana Kaatru		Tamil
1990	Kiladi Thatha		Kannada
1990	Ghayal	Dancer	Hindi
1990	Challenge Gopalakrishna		Kannada
1990	Sididedda Gandu		Kannada
1990	Sandhana Kaatru		Tamil
1990	Gunahon Ka Devta	Dancer	Hindi
1990	My Dear Marthandan		Tamil
1990	Anantha Prema		Kannada
1990	Pundara Ganda		Kannada
1990	48 Manikkur		Malayalam
1990	Manaivi Oru Manickam		Tamil
1990	Chakadola Karuchi Leela	Dancer	Odia
1990	Raktha Jwala		Telugu
1990	Chinnari Muddula Papa	Shanti	Telugu
1990	Ashwamedha		Kannada
1990	Jamai Raja	Aruna	Hindi
1990	Challenge		Kannada
1990	Oru Veedu Iru Vasal		Tamil
1990	Shivaraj		Kannada
1990	Jungle Love		Hindi
1991	SP Bhargavi		Kannada
1991	Naag Mani	Item number in the song "Mera Laung Gawaacha"	Hindi
1991	Pondatti Pondattithan	Padma	Tamil
1991	Sami Potta Mudichu		Tamil
1991	Zaher		Hindi
1991	Prema Pareekshe	Madonna	Kannada
1991	Nee Pathi Naan Pathi		Tamil
1991	Super Express		Telugu
1991	Rowdy Alludu	Item number in the song "Amalapuram Bulloda"	Telugu
1991	Eeramana Rojave		Tamil
1991	Vetri Padigal		Tamil
1991	Alludu Diddina Kapuram		Telugu
1991	Anatha Rakshaka		Kannada
1991	Shanti Enathu Shanti		Tamil
1991	Mathru Bhagya	Julie	Kannada
1992	Balarama Krishnulu	Comedy role / Dancer	Telugu
1992	Amaran		Tamil
1992	Gharaana Mogudu	Item number in the song "Bangaru Kodi Petta"	Telugu
1992	Chinnavar	Item number in the song "Padakottum Pattammah"	Tamil
1992	Putta Hendthi		Kannada
1992	Srimaan Brahmachari		Telugu
1992	420		Telugu
1992	Karuninchina Kanaka Durga		Telugu
1992	Sigappu Paravai		Tamil
1992	Radha Ka Sangam		Hindi
1992	Police File		Kannada
1992	Agni Paarvai		Tamil
1992	Banni Ondsala Nodi		Kannada
1992	Pangali		Tamil
1992	Kaaval Geetham		Tamil
1992	President Gari Pellam	Singing voice	Telugu
1992	Rishi		Malayalam
1992	Alli Ramachari Illi Brahmachari		Kannada
1992	Bharathan		Tamil
1992	Natchathira Nayagan		Tamil
1992	Meera		Tamil
1993	Jana Mecchida Maga		Kannada
1993	Minmini Poochigal		Tamil
1993	RRRKRMRGKK		Tamil
1993	Prathap		Tamil
1993	Sabash Babu		Tamil
1993	Srinatha Kavi Sarvabhowmudu		Telugu
1993	Donga Alludu		Telugu
1993	Rowdy Gari Teacher		Telugu
1993	Nakshatra Poratam		Telugu
1993	Aaha Brahmachari		Kannada
1993	Suryodaya		Kannada
1993	Prathiphala		Kannada
1993	Mechanic Alludu		Telugu
1993	Mane Devru		Kannada
1993	Vintha Kodallu		Telugu
1993	Sarkarakke Saval		Kannada
1993	Poorna Sangrama		Kannada
1993	Khaidi No. 407		Kannada
1993	Mojina Maduve		Kannada
1993	Kundan	Dancer in 'Ga Re Ga Re' song	Hindi
1993	Bhagyawan		Hindi
1994	Vaade Iraade		Hindi
1994	Cheetah		Hindi
1994	Ilaignar Ani	Rukku	Tamil
1994	Kurradhi Kurradu		Telugu
1994	Alexander		Kannada
1994	Andaru Andare		Telugu
1994	Thanikhe		Kannada
1994	Atha Maga Rathiname		Tamil
1994	Rickshaw Rudraiah		Telugu
1994	Brahmachari Mogudu		Telugu
1994	Pavithra	Shiba	Tamil
1994	Bangaru Kutumbam		Telugu
1994	Dulaara		Hindi
1994	Gandugali		Kannada
1995	Muthu Kaalai		Tamil
1995	Bhale Bullodu		Telugu
1995	Mayabazaar		Telugu
1995	Muddayi Muddugumma		Telugu
1995	Raja Enga Raja		Tamil
1995	Naajayaz		Hindi
1995	God and Gun		Hindi
1995	Betegara		Kannada
1995	Putmalli		Kannada
1995	Ganeshana Galate		Kannada
1996	Aatank		Hindi
1996	Boss		Kannada
1996	Irattai Roja		Tamil
1996	Stunt Master		Kannada
1996	Rambha Rajyadalli Rowdy		Kannada
1996	Gaaya		Kannada
1996	Bangarada Mane		Kannada
1996	Thuraimugam		Tamil
1996	Samayakkondu Sullu		Kannada
1997	Yuddha		Kannada

As producer

- Seshadri Naidu (2004)

== See also ==
- South Indian film industry
