= List of films: I =

indexed lists of films
| 0–9 | A | B | C | D | E | F |
| G | H | I | J–K | L | M | N–O |
| P | Q–R | S | T | U–V–W | X–Y–Z | |

This is an alphabetical list of film articles (or sections within articles about films). It includes made for television films. See the talk page for the method of indexing used.

== I ==
=== I ===
- I Accuse My Parents (1944)
- I Am: (2010 American documentary, 2010 American drama, 2010 Indian & 2012)
- I Am All Girls (2021)
- I Am an American Soldier (2007)
- I Am Big Bird: The Caroll Spinney Story (2014)
- I Am Cuba (1964)
- I Am Curious (Blue) (1968)
- I Am Curious (Yellow) (1967)
- I Am David (2003)
- I Am Dina (2002)
- I Am a Fugitive from a Chain Gang (1932)
- I Am Greta (2020)
- I Am Heath Ledger (2017)
- I Am a Hero (2016)
- I Am Human (2019)
- I Am Jonas (2018)
- I Am Josh Polonski's Brother (2001)
- I Am Kalam (2010)
- I Am the Law: (1922, 1938 & 1977)
- I am Legend (2007)
- I Am Lisa (2020)
- I Am Love (2009)
- I Am Michael (2015)
- I Am Mother (2019)
- I Am Nezha (2016)
- I Am Not a Hipster (2012)
- I Am Not Lorena (2014)
- I Am Not a Serial Killer (2016)
- I Am Not What You Want (2001)
- I Am Not a Witch (2017)
- I Am Not Your Negro (2016)
- I Am Number Four (2011)
- I Am Omega (2007)
- I Am the Pretty Thing That Lives in the House (2016)
- I Am Sam (2001)
- I am Sartana, Your Angel of Death (1969)
- I Am a Sex Addict (2006)
- I Am Trying to Break Your Heart (2002)
- I Am Vengeance (2018)
- I Am Vengeance: Retaliation (2020)
- I Belonged to You (2016)
- I Bury the Living (1958)
- I Came By (2022)
- I Can Do Bad All by Myself (2009)
- I Can Get It for You Wholesale (1951)
- I Can Hear the Sea (1993)
- I Can Only Imagine (2018)
- I Can Only Imagine 2 (2026)
- I Can't Go Home (2008)
- I Can't Sleep (1994)
- I Capture the Castle (2003)
- I Care a Lot (2020)
- I Carry You with Me (2020)
- I Come in Peace (1990)
- I Confess (1953)
- I Could Go On Singing (1963)
- I Could Never Be Your Woman (2007)
- I Cover the Waterfront (1933)
- I Died a Thousand Times (1955)
- I Do Not Care If We Go Down in History as Barbarians (2018)
- I Do Not Want to Know Who You Are (1932)
- I Don't Feel at Home in This World Anymore (2017)
- I Don't Hear the Guitar Anymore (1991)
- I Don't Know How She Does It (2011)
- I Don't Understand You (2024)
- I Dood It (1943)
- I Downloaded a Ghost (2004)
- I Dream Too Much: (1935 & 2015)
- I Dreamed of Africa (2000)
- I Drink Your Blood (1971)
- I Eat Your Skin (1971)
- I Even Met Happy Gypsies (1967)
- I Feel Pretty (2018)
- I Fidanzati (1962)
- I Girasoli (1970)
- I Give It a Year (2013)
- I Got the Hook Up (1998)
- I Got Life! (2017)
- I Hate Luv Storys (2010)
- I Hate Valentine's Day (2009)
- I Have Something Important to Tell You (2005)
- I Haven't Got a Hat (1935)
- I Heard the Owl Call My Name (1973 TV)
- I Heart Huckabees (2004)
- I Hired a Contract Killer (1990)
- I Hope They Serve Beer in Hell (2009)
- I as in Icarus (1979)
- The I Inside (2004)
- I Kill Giants (2017)
- I Kill, You Kill (1965)
- I Killed My Lesbian Wife, Hung Her on a Meat Hook, and Now I Have a Three-Picture Deal at Disney (1993)
- I Killed My Mother (2009)
- I Kiss Your Hand, Madame (1929)
- I Knew Her Well (1965)
- I Knew That Woman (1942)
- I Know What You Did Last Summer: (1997 & 2025)
- I Know Where I'm Going! (1945)
- I Know Who Killed Me (2007)
- I Like You, I Like You Very Much (1994)
- I Live in Fear (1955)
- I Live Here Now (2026)
- I Live My Life (1935)
- I Lost My Body (2019)
- I Love Beijing (2000)
- I Love Boosters (2026)
- I Love a Man in Uniform (1993)
- I Love to Singa (1936)
- I Love That Crazy Little Thing (2016)
- I Love Trouble (1994)
- I Love Wolffy (2012)
- I Love Wolffy 2 (2013)
- I Love You: (1979, 1981, 1986, 1992, 2002, 2005 Croatian, 2005 Odia, 2007 Bengali & 2007 Mozambican)
- I Love You Again (1940)
- I Love You Baby (2001)
- I Love You to Death (1990)
- I Love You Forever (2024)
- I Love You Phillip Morris (2010)
- I Love You Too (2002)
- I Love You, Alice B. Toklas (1968)
- I Love You, Beth Cooper (2009)
- I Love You, I Love You Not (1996)
- I Love You, Man (2009)
- I Love Your Work (2003)
- I Married an Angel (1942)
- I Married a Communist (1949)
- I Married a Monster from Outer Space (1958)
- I Married a Strange Person! (1997)
- I Married a Witch (1942)
- I Me Wed (2007)
- I Melt with You (2011)
- I Met Him in Paris (1937)
- I Missed Flight 93 (2006)
- I Never Promised You a Rose Garden (1977)
- I Never Sang for My Father (1970)
- I Now Pronounce You Chuck & Larry (2007)
- I Play Rocky (2026)
- I Proud to Be an Indian (2004)
- I Remember Mama (1948)
- I Remember You: (2015 & 2017)
- I Remember You Now... (2005)
- I Saw the Devil (2010)
- I Saw Mommy Kissing Santa Claus (2001)
- I Saw the TV Glow (2024)
- I Saw What You Did: (1965 & 1988 TV)
- I See You: (2006 & 2019)
- I Sell the Dead (2009)
- I Served the King of England (2006)
- I Shot Andy Warhol (1996)
- I Shot Jesse James (1949)
- I Spit on Your Grave: (1978 & 2010)
- I Spit on Your Grave 2 (2013)
- I Spit on Your Grave: Deja Vu (2019)
- I Spy (2002)
- I Stand Alone (1998)
- I Start Counting (1970)
- I Step Through Moscow (1963)
- I Still Believe (2020)
- I Still Hide To Smoke (2017)
- I Still Know What You Did Last Summer (1998)
- I Stole a Million (1939)
- I Take This Oath (1940)
- I Think I Do (1998)
- I Think I Love My Wife (2007)
- I Think We're Alone Now (2018)
- I Trapped the Devil (2019)
- I Vampiri (1957)
- I Vitelloni (1953)
- I Wake Up Screaming (1942)
- I Walk Alone (1948)
- I Walked with a Zombie (1943)
- I Wanna Hold Your Hand (1978)
- I Want Candy (2007)
- I Want a Dog (2003)
- I Want to Live! (1958)
- I Want Someone to Eat Cheese With (2006)
- I Want What I Want (1972)
- I Want Your Sex (2026)
- I Was Born, But... (1932)
- I Was a Communist for the FBI (1951)
- I Was Here (2008)
- I Was at Home, But (2019)
- I Was a Male War Bride (1949)
- I Was Monty's Double (1958)
- I Was a Shoplifter (1950)
- I Was a Simple Man (2021)
- I Was a Teenage Frankenstein (1957)
- I Was a Teenage Werewolf (1957)
- I Was a Teenage Zombie (1987)
- I Will Survive (1993)
- I Wish I Had a Wife (2001)
- I Wish I Knew (2010)
- I Wish You All the Best (2025)
- I Woke Up Early the Day I Died (1999)
- I, Anna (2012)
- I, Claudius (1937)
- I, Daniel Blake (2016)
- I, Frankenstein (2014)
- I, the Jury: (1953 & 1982)
- I, Madman (1989)
- I, Me Aur Main (2013)
- I, Monster (1971)
- I, Robot (2004)
- I, Tonya (2017)
- I, a Woman (1965)
- I, Zombie: A Chronicle of Pain (1998)
- I.D. (1995)
- I.Q. (1994)
- I-San Special (2002)

=== I' ===
- I'd Climb the Highest Mountain (1951)
- I'd Give My Life (1936)
- I'd Like You to Live My Youth Again (2022)
- I'd Love to Take Orders from You (1936)
- I'd Rather Be Rich (1964)
- I'd Receive the Worst News from Your Beautiful Lips (2011)
- I'll Always Know What You Did Last Summer (2006)
- I'll Always Love You: (1933 & 1943)
- I'll Be Alone After Midnight (1931)
- I'll Be Glad When You're Dead You Rascal You (1932)
- I'll Be Going Now (1990)
- I'll Be Gone in June (2026)
- I'll Be Home for Christmas (1988) (TV)
- I'll Be Home for Christmas (1998)
- I'll Be Next Door for Christmas (2018)
- I'll Be Right Over (1942)
- I'll Be Right There (2023)
- I'll Be Seeing You (1944)
- I'll Be Seeing You (2004) (TV)
- I'll Be There (2003)
- I'll Be There (2010)
- I'll Be Watching (2023)
- I'll Be Your Sweetheart (1945)
- I'll Believe You (2006)
- I'll Bury You Tomorrow (2002)
- I'll Carry You in My Arms (1943)
- I'll Carry You in My Arms (1958)
- I'll Crush Y'all (2023)
- I'll Cry Tomorrow (1955)
- I'll Do Anything (1994)
- I'll End Up in Jail (2019)
- I'll Enter Heaven Dancing (2016)
- I'll Find a Way (1977)
- I'll Find You (2019)
- I'll Fix It (1934)
- I'll Follow You Down (2013)
- I'll Get Back to Kandara (1956)
- I'll Get By (1950)
- I'll Get Him Yet (1919)
- I'll Get You for This (1951)
- I'll Give a Million: (1935 & 1938)
- I'll Give My Life (1960)
- I'll Go to the Minister (1962)
- I'll Kill Him and Return Alone (1967)
- I'll Love You Always (1935)
- I'll Make You Happy (1944)
- I'll Make You Happy (1949)
- I'll Make You Happy (1999)
- I'll Meet You There (2020)
- I'll Name the Murderer (1936)
- I'll Never Forget That Night (1949)
- I'll Never Forget What's'isname (1967)
- I'll Never Forget You (1951)
- I'll Never Get to Heaven (1993) (TV)
- I'll Never Heil Again (1941)
- I'll Never Lose You (2015)
- I'll Remember April: (1945 & 1999)
- I'll Say So (1918)
- I'll See You at Lake Constance (1956)
- I'll See You in My Dreams: (1951, 2003 & 2015)
- I'll Sell My Life (1941)
- I'll Sell My Skin Dearly (1968)
- I'll Show You the Town (1925)
- I'll Sleep When I'm Dead (2003)
- I'll Stick to You (1933)
- I'll Take Her Like a Father (1974)
- I'll Take My Chances (2011)
- I'll Take Romance (1937)
- I'll Take Sweden (1965)
- I'll Tell the World (1934)
- I'll Tell the World (1945)
- I'll Turn to You (1946)
- I'll Wait for You (1941)
- I'll Walk Beside You (1943)
- I'm Afraid to Go Home in the Dark (1930)
- I'm After You (2015) (TV)
- I'm All Good (2008)
- I'm All Right Jack (1959)
- I'm All Yours (2015)
- I'm Almost Not Crazy: John Cassavetes, the Man and His Work (1984)
- I'm Back (2018)
- I'm Beginning to See the Light (2025)
- I'm Bond, GG Bond (2025)
- I'm Bout It (1997)
- I'm Charlie Walker (2022)
- I'm Chevy Chase and You're Not (2026)
- I'm Cold (1954)
- I'm Crazy About Iris Blond (1996)
- I'm Cris from Tierra Bomba (2023)
- I'm a Cyborg, But That's OK (2006)
- I'm Dancing as Fast as I Can (1982)
- I'm Dangerous Tonight (1990) (TV)
- I'm Dead but I Have Friends (2015)
- I'm Done (1975)
- I'm Drunk, I Love You (2017)
- I'm Game (2026)
- I'm Getting a Yacht (1980)
- I'm Gilda (2016)
- I'm Glad My Mother Is Alive (2009)
- I'm Glad You're Dead Now (2025)
- I'm Going to Be Famous (1983)
- I'm Going to Break Your Heart (2019)
- I'm Going to Get You, Elliott Boy (1971)
- I'm Going Home (2001)
- I'm Going to Live by Myself (1982)
- I'm Going Out for Cigarettes (2018)
- I'm Going to Search (1966)
- I'm Going to Tell You a Secret (2005)
- I'm Gonna Explode (2008)
- I'm Gonna Git You Sucka (1988)
- I'm Handsome (Since 2009) (2026)
- I'm Here (2010)
- I'm Here, Darlings! (1975) (TV)
- I'm Just Here for the Riot (2023)
- I'm Livin' It (2019)
- I'm Losing You (1998)
- I'm Marrying the Director (1960)
- I'm Never Afraid! (2010)
- I'm No Angel (1933)
- I'm No Dummy (2009)
- I'm No Longer Here (2019)
- I'm Nobody's Sweetheart Now (1940)
- I'm Not Angry! (2014)
- I'm Not Ashamed (2016)
- I'm Not a Killer (2019)
- I'm Not Rappaport (1996)
- I'm Not a Robot (2023)
- I'm Not Scared (2003)
- I'm Not a Terrorist (2021)
- I'm Not There (2007)
- I'm Obsessed with You (But You've Got to Leave Me Alone) (2014)
- I'm Off Then (2015)
- I'm Photogenic (1980)
- I'm Reed Fish (2006)
- I'm Rick James (2007)
- I'm Rose, Darling (2015)
- I'm So Excited (2013)
- I'm Sorry You Feel That Way (2014)
- I'm Starting from Three (1981)
- I'm Staying (2007)
- I'm Staying! (2003)
- I'm Still Alive (1940)
- I'm Still Here (2010)
- I'm Still Here (2024)
- I'm Still Here: The Truth About Schizophrenia (1996)
- I'm Taraneh, 15 (2002)
- I'm Thinking of Ending Things (2020)
- I'm Through with White Girls (2007)
- I'm Totally Fine (2022)
- I'm Waiting for You (1952)
- I'mPerfect (2025)
- I've Always Loved You (1946)
- I've Been Around (1935)
- I've Been Waiting for You (1998) (TV)
- I've Fallen for You (2007)
- I've Got a Horse (1938)
- I've Got to Sing a Torch Song (1933)
- I've Got Your Number (1934)
- I've Gotta Horse (1965)
- I've Heard the Mermaids Singing (1987)
- I've Lived Before (1956)
- I've Lost My Husband! (1937)
- I've Loved You So Long (2008)
- I've Never Been Happier (2009)

=== Ia–Ib ===
- Iacob (1988)
- Iago (2009)
- Iamhere (2019)
- Iavnana (1994)
- Ibbani Karagithu (1983)
- Ibbani Tabbida Ileyali (2024)
- Ibbara Naduve Muddina Aata (1996)
- Ibelin (2024)
- Ibiza (2018)
- Iblis (2018)
- Ibong Adarna (1941)
- Ibtida: The Beginning (2015)

=== Ic ===
- Icahn: The Restless Billionaire (2022)
- Icarus (2010)
- Icarus (2017)
- Icarus (2022)
- Icarus: The Legend of Mietek Kosz (2019)
- The Icarus Line Must Die (2017)
- Icche (2011)
- Ice (1970)
- Ice (1998) (TV)
- Ice (2003)
- Ice (2018)
- Ice 2 (2020)
- Ice 3 (2024)
- Ice Age (1975)
- Ice Age series:
  - Ice Age (2002)
  - Ice Age: The Meltdown (2006)
  - Ice Age: Dawn of the Dinosaurs (2009)
  - Ice Age: Continental Drift (2012)
  - Ice Age: Collision Course (2016)
  - The Ice Age Adventures of Buck Wild (2022)
  - Ice Age: Boiling Point (2027)
- Ice Angel (2000 TV)
- Ice Bar (2006)
- Ice Blues (2008 TV)
- Ice Bound: A Woman's Survival at the South Pole (2003)
- Ice Breaker (2004)
- Ice Castles: (1978 & 2010)
- Ice Cold in Alex (1958)
- Ice Cold: Murder, Coffee and Jessica Wongso (2023)
- Ice Cream (1986)
- Ice Cream (1993)
- Ice Cream (2014)
- Ice Cream (2015)
- Ice Cream (2016)
- Ice Cream 2 (2014)
- Ice Cream, Chocolate and Other Consolations (2001)
- Ice Cream in the Cupboard (2019)
- Ice Cream Man (1995)
- Ice Cream Man (2026)
- The Ice Cream Man (2024)
- Ice Cream and the Sound of Raindrops (2017)
- Ice Cream, I Scream (2006)
- The Ice Cream Truck (2017)
- Icefall (2025)
- The Ice Flood (1926)
- The Ice Follies of 1939 (1939)
- The Ice Forest (2014)
- Ice Guardians (2016)
- The Ice Harvest (2005)
- The Ice House: (1969 & 1978 TV)
- Ice Kacang Puppy Love (2010)
- Ice Kings (2006)
- Ice Men (2005)
- Ice Merchants (2022)
- Ice Mother (2017)
- Ice Palace (1960)
- Ice People (1987)
- Ice People (2008)
- The Ice Pirates (1984)
- Ice Planet (2001)
- Ice Poison (2014)
- Ice Princess (2005)
- Ice Quake (2010 TV)
- Ice Queen (2005)
- Ice Rain (2004)
- The Ice Rink (1998)
- The Ice Road (2021)
- Ice Road: Vengeance (2025)
- Ice and the Sky (2015)
- Ice Soldiers (2013)
- Ice Spiders (2007 TV)
- Ice Station Zebra (1968)
- The Ice Storm (1997)
- The Ice Tower (2025)
- Ice Twisters (2009 TV)
- Ice-Capades (1941)
- Ice-Capades Revue (1942)
- Icebound (1924)
- Icebreaker (2000)
- The Icebreaker (2016)
- Iced (1988)
- The Iced Bullet (1917)
- Iceland (1942)
- The Icelandic Dream (2000)
- Iceman: (1984, 2014 & 2017)
- The Iceman (2012)
- The Iceman Cometh: (1973 & 1989)
- The Iceman Ducketh (1964)
- Ichadi Manini (2019)
- Ichata Vahanamulu Niluparadu (2021)
- Ichchhemotir Gappo (2015)
- Iche Tampha (2017)
- Ichi (2008)
- Ichi the Killer (2001)
- Ichijo's Wet Lust (1972)
- The Icicle Thief (1989)
- Ick (2024)
- Ico, el caballito valiente (1987)
- Icon (2005 TV)
- Icy Breasts (1974)

=== Id ===
- The Id (2016)

==== Ida–Idy ====
- Ida (2013)
- Idaho: (1925 & 1943)
- Idaho Kid (1936)
- Idaho Red (1929)
- Idaho Transfer (1973)
- Idahosa Trails (2017)
- Idam Jagath (2018)
- Idam Porul Yaeval (TBD)
- Idanazhiyil Oru Kaalocha (1987)
- Idavela (1982)
- Idavelakku Sesham (1984)
- Idaya Kovil (1985)
- Iddarammayilatho (2013)
- Iddari Lokam Okate (2019)
- Iddaru Asadhyule (1979)
- Iddaru Attala Muddula Alludu (2006)
- Iddaru Iddare (1990)
- Iddaru Mitrulu: (1961 & 1999)
- Iddaru Pellala Muddula Police (1991)
- Iddaru Pellalu (1954)
- Ide Mahasudina (1965)
- The Idea (1932)
- Idea Girl (1946)
- The Idea of You (2024)
- Ideachi Kalpana (2010)
- An Ideal Adventure (1982)
- The Ideal City (2012)
- The Ideal Couple (1946)
- Ideal Friend (2025)
- Ideal Home (2018)
- An Ideal Husband: (1935, 1947 UK, 1947 Argentina, 1980 & 1999 & 2000)
- The Ideal Man (1996)
- An Ideal Woman (1929)
- Idealist (1976)
- The Idealist (2015)
- Idem Paris (2013)
- Identical (2011)
- The Identical (2014)
- Identification Marks: None (1965)
- Identification of a Woman (1982)
- Identifying Features (2020)
- Identikit (1974)
- Identity: (1987, 2003 & 2025)
- Identity Card: (2010 & 2014)
- Identity Crisis (1989)
- Identity Pieces (1998)
- Identity Theft (2004 TV)
- Identity Thief (2013)
- Identity Unknown: (1945 & 1960)
- The Ides of March: (1961 TV & 2011)
- Idharkuthane Aasaipattai Balakumara (2013)
- Idhaya Kamalam (1965)
- Idhaya Malar (1976)
- Idhaya Thamarai (1990)
- Idhaya Thirudan (2006)
- Idhaya Vaasal (1991)
- Idhaya Veenai (1972)
- Idhayakkani (1975)
- Idhayam (1991)
- Idhayam Pesugirathu (1981)
- Idhayam Thiraiarangam (2012)
- Idhayathil Nee (1963)
- Idhayaththil Ore Idam (1980)
- Idhe Maa Katha (2021)
- Idhu Enna Maayam (2015)
- Idhu Kadhal Varum Paruvam (2006)
- Idhu Kathirvelan Kadhal (2014)
- Idhu Namma Aalu: (1988 & 2016)
- Idhu Namma Bhoomi (1992)
- Idhu Nijama (1948)
- Idhu Oru Thodar Kathai (1987)
- Idhu Sathiyam (1963)
- Idhu Unga Kudumbam (1989)
- Idhuthanda Sattam (1992)
- Idhuvum Kadandhu Pogum (2014)
- Idi Katha Kaadu (1979)
- Idi Maa Ashokgadi Love Story (2003)
- Idi Muzhakkam (1980)
- Idi Naa Love Story (2018)
- Idi Pellantara (1982)
- Idi Sangathi (2008)
- Idiocracy (2006)
- Idiot: (1992, 2002, 2012 & 2022)
- The Idiot: (1946, 1951, 1958 & 2011)
- Idiot Box (1996)
- The Idiot Cycle (2009)
- Idiot: I Do Ishq Only Tumse (2012)
- The Idiot Maiden (2006)
- An Idiot in Paris (1967)
- The Idiot Returns (1999)
- Idiot's Delight (1939)
- Idiots: (2012 & 2026)
- The Idiots (1998)
- Idiots and Angels (2008)
- Idiyan Chandhu (2024)
- Idiyum Minnalum (1982)
- The Idle Class (1921)
- Idle Hands (1999)
- The Idle Rich: (1914, 1921 & 1929)
- Idle Roomers: (1931 & 1944)
- Idle Wives (1916)
- The Idler (1914)
- Idlewild (2006)
- Idli Kadai (2025)
- Idol (2019)
- The Idol: (1923, 1948, 1952, 1966, 2015 & 2018)
- The iDol (2006)
- Idol Affair (2024)
- Idol: The April Boy Regino Story (2024)
- The Idol of Bonanza Camp (1913)
- Idol of the Crowds (1937)
- The Idol Dancer (1920)
- The Idol of the North (1921)
- Idol on Parade (1959)
- Idol of Paris (1948)
- The Idol of Paris (1914)
- Idolators (1917)
- Idolatrada (1983)
- Idolle Ramayana (2016)
- The Idolmaker (1980)
- The Idolmaster Movie: Beyond the Brilliant Future! (2014)
- Idols (1943)
- Idols of Clay (1920)
- Idols of the Radio (1934)
- Idomeneo (1982) (TV)
- Idu Saadhya (1989)
- Idukki Gold (2013)
- Idyla ze staré Prahy (1918)
- Idyll in Budapest (1941)
- An Idyll of the Hills (1915)
- Idylle au Caire (1933)

=== If ===
- IF (2024)
- If.... (1968)
- If All Goes Wrong (2008)
- If All the Guys in the World (1956)
- If Anything Happens I Love You (2020)
- If Beale Street Could Talk (2018)
- If Cats Disappeared From the World (2016)
- If... Dog... Rabbit... (1999)
- If Ever I See You Again (1978)
- If Footmen Tire You, What Will Horses Do? (1971)
- If Four Walls Told (1923)
- If God Is Willing and da Creek Don't Rise (2010)
- If He Hollers, Let Him Go! (1968)
- If I Am President (2018)
- If I Can't Have Love, I Want Power (2021)
- If I Could Marry the Minister (1941)
- If I Didn't Care (2007)
- If I Go Will They Miss Me (2026)
- If I Had Known I Was a Genius (2007)
- If I Had Legs I'd Kick You (2025)
- If I Had a Million (1932)
- If I Had My Way (1940)
- If I Had You (2006 TV)
- If I Knew What You Said (2009)
- If I Marry Again (1925)
- If I Should Fall (2010)
- If I Stay (2014)
- If I Want to Whistle, I Whistle (2010)
- If I Was She (2004 TV)
- If I Were a Congressman (1952)
- If I Were Free (1933)
- If I Were Just Anyone (1950)
- If I Were King: (1920 & 1938)
- If I Were Queen (1922)
- If I Were for Real (1981)
- If I Were Rich (1936)
- If I Were a Rich Man (2002)
- If I Were Single (1927)
- If I Were a Spy (1967)
- If I Were You: (2006, 2012 Canadian & 2012 Chinese)
- If I'm to Be Killed Tomorrow (1947)
- If I'm Lucky (1946)
- If It Don't Fit, Use a Bigger Hammer (2002)
- If It Were Love (2020)
- If It's Tuesday, This Must Be Belgium: (1969 & 1987 TV)
- If Looks Could Kill (1991)
- If Lucy Fell (1996)
- If Marriage Fails (1925)
- If My Country Should Call (1916)
- If Not Us, Who? (2011)
- If Only (2004)
- If Only Everyone (2012)
- If Only It Weren't Love (1925)
- If Paris Were Told to Us (1956)
- If Someone Had Known (1995)
- If the Sun Rises in the West (1998)
- If There Be Thorns (2015) (TV)
- If There Is a Reason to Study (2016)
- If These Walls Could Talk (1996) (TV)
- If These Walls Could Talk 2 (2000) (TV)
- If They Tell You I Fell (1989)
- If Thou Wert Blind (1917)
- If Tomorrow Comes (1971 TV)
- If Tomorrow Never Comes (2016)
- If War Comes Tomorrow (1938)
- If We All Were Angels: (1936 & 1956)
- If We Only Knew (1913)
- If You Are the One (2008)
- If You Meet Sartana Pray for Your Death (1968)

==== Ifi ====
- Ifigenia (1987)

=== Ig–Ik ===
- Igby Goes Down (2002)
- Igillenna Ai Dagalanne (2013)
- Iginuhit ng Tadhana (The Ferdinand E. Marcos Story) (1965)
- Igloo: (1932 & 2019)
- Ignition (2001)
- Ignorance Is Bliss (2017)
- Igor (2008)
- Igor and the Lunatics (1985)
- Igualita a mí (2010)
- Iguana (1988)
- Ihmiset suviyössä (1948)
- Ihre Hoheit die Tänzerin (1922)
- Ijaazat (1987)
- Ik Doli (1982)
- Ik ga naar Tahiti (1992)
- Ik Jind Ik Jaan (2006)
- Ik Kudi Punjab Di (2010)
- Ik Madari (1973)
- Ik Omhels Je Met 1000 Armen (2006)
- Ikarie XB-1 (1963)
- Ikarus, the Flying Man (1918)
- Ikaw Ay Akin (1978)
- Ikaw Lang (1993)
- Ikaw Pa Lang ang Minahal (1992)
- Ikaw ang Pag-ibig (2011)
- Ike: Countdown to D-Day (2004)
- Iké Boys (2021)
- Ikigami (2008)
- Ikíngut (2000)
- Ikiru (1952)
- Ikiteiru Koheiji (1957)
- Ikkat (2021)
- Ikke Pe Ikka (1994)
- Ikraar (1979)

=== Il ===
- Ilaaka (1989)
- Ilakkanam (2006)
- Ilamai (1985)
- Ilamai Kaalangal (1983)
- Ilamai Kolam (1980)
- Ilamai Oonjal (2016)
- Ilamai Oonjal Aadukirathu (1978)
- Ilami (2016)
- Ilampuyal (2009)
- Ilangeswaran (1987)
- Ilanjippookkal (1986)
- Ilanjodigal (1982)
- Ilavarasan (1992)
- Ilavelpu (1956)
- Ilaya Ragam (1995)
- Ilaya Thalaimurai (1977)
- Ilayaraja (2019)
- Ilayum Mullum (1994)
- Ilf and Petrov Rode a Tram (1972)
- Ill Gotten Gains (1997)
- Ill Manors (2012)
- Ill Met by Moonlight (1957)
- Ill Noise (2017)
- Ill Wind (2007)
- Illale Devata (1985)
- Illalu (1940)
- Illalu Priyuralu (1984)
- Illam (1988)
- Illang: The Wolf Brigade (2018)
- Illara Jothi (1954)
- Illarame Nallaram (1958)
- Illarikam (1959)
- The Illegal (2021)
- Illegal Aliens (2007)
- Illegal Entry (1949)
- The Illegal Immigrant (1985)
- Illegal Tender (2007)
- Illicit: (1931 & 2017)
- Illicit Dreams (1994)
- Illicit Dreams 2 (1997)
- Illiterate (2013)
- The Illiterate One (1961)
- Ilona Arrives with the Rain (1996)
- Illuminata (1999)
- The Illumination (1973)
- Illusion (2004)
- Illusion of Blood (1965)
- Illusion Travels by Streetcar (1954)
- The Illusionauts (2012)
- The Illusionist: (1983, 2006 & 2010)
- Illusions (1982)
- Illusions & Mirrors (2013)
- Illusive Tracks (2003)
- The Illustrated Man (1969)
- Illustrious Corpses (1976)
- The Illustrious Prince (1919)
- Ilsa series:
  - Ilsa, Harem Keeper of the Oil Sheiks (1976)
  - Ilsa, She Wolf of the SS (1975)
  - Ilsa, the Tigress of Siberia (1977)
  - Ilsa, the Wicked Warden (1977)
- Ilya Muromets (1956)
- Ilzaam (1986)

=== Im ===
- Im Banne des Unheimlichen (1968)

==== Ima ====
- Ima (2022)
- Ima Machet Icha Tangkhai (2021)
- Imaandaar (1987)
- Image (2004)
- The Image (1969)
- The Image (1975)
- The Image (1990)
- The Image Book (2018)
- The Image of Bruce Lee (1978)
- Image of Death (1978 TV)
- The Image Maker (1917)
- The Image Makers (2000) (TV)
- An Image of the Past (1915)
- Image of Victory (2021)
- The Image of You (2024)
- The Imagemaker (1986)
- Images (1972)
- Images in a Convent (1979)
- Images of a Dictatorship (1999)
- Images of Liberation (1982)
- Imagi Ningthem (1981)
- Imaginaerum (2012)
- The Imaginarium of Doctor Parnassus (2009)
- Imaginary (2024)
- The Imaginary (2023)
- The Imaginary Baron (1927)
- Imaginary Crimes (1994)
- Imaginary Friend (2012 TV)
- Imaginary Heroes (2004)
- The Imaginary Invalid (1934)
- The Imaginary Invalid (1952)
- Imaginary Larry (2009)
- Imaginary Playmate (2006)
- An Imaginary Tale (1990)
- The Imaginary Voyage (1926)
- Imaginary Witness (2004)
- Imagination (2007)
- Imagine: (1972, 2012 & 2022)
- Imagine Me & You (2005)
- Imagine the Sound (1981)
- Imagine That (2009)
- Imagine You and Me (2016)
- Imagining America (1989)
- Imagining Argentina (2003)
- Imagining Indians (1992)
- Imagining October (1984)
- Imaginum (2005)
- Imago (2016)
- Imago Mortis (2009)
- Imaikkaa Nodigal (2018)
- Iman (2023)
- Imani (2010)
- Imar the Servitor (1914)
- Imayam (1979)

==== Imb–Imt ====
- Imbabazi: The Pardon (2013)
- Imelda (2003)
- Imelda Papin: The Untold Story (2023)
- Imfura (2017)
- Imitation (2007)
- Imitation of Christ (1967)
- The Imitation Game (2014)
- Imitation General (1958)
- Imitation of Life: (1934 & 1959)
- Immaan Dharam (1977)
- Immacolata and Concetta: The Other Jealousy (1980)
- Immaculate: (1950, 2021 & 2024)
- Immaculate Conception (1992)
- Immaculate Memories: The Uncluttered Worlds of Christopher Pratt (2018)
- The Immaculate Room (2022)
- Immadi Pulikeshi (1967)
- Immanuel (2013)
- ImMature (2019)
- Immediate Call (1939)
- Immediate Delivery (1963)
- Immediate Family (1989)
- Immensee (1943)
- Immer die Radfahrer (1958)
- Immersion (2021)
- The Immigrant: (1915, 1917 & 2013)
- Immigrants: (1948 & 2008)
- Immigration Tango (2010)
- Imminent Threat (2015)
- Immoral Affairs (1997)
- Immoral Tales (1973)
- Immoral Women (1979)
- Immorality (1928)
- Immortal: (2004 & 2015)
- Immortal Beloved: (1951 & 1994)
- Immortal Combat (1994)
- Immortal Gentleman (1935)
- Immortal Light (1951)
- Immortal Love (1961)
- Immortal Melodies (1952)
- Immortal Sergeant (1943)
- Immortal Song (1952)
- Immortal Waltz (1939)
- Immorality (2016)
- Immortality or Bust (2019)
- Immortally Yours (2009)
- Immortals (2011)
- Impact: (1949 & 1963)
- Impasse (1969)
- Impasse de la vignette (1990)
- Impeccable Henri (1948)
- Imperative (1982)
- Imperfect: (2012 & 2019)
- Imperfect High (2021 TV)
- Imperfect Journey (1994)
- The Imperfect Lady (1947)
- Imperial Blue (2019)
- Imperial Navy (1981)
- Imperial and Royal Field Marshal: (1930 & 1956)
- Imperial Venus (1962)
- Imperial Violets: (1924, 1932 & 1952)
- Imperium (2016)
- Imperium series:
  - Imperium: Augustus (2003 TV)
  - Imperium: Nero (2004 TV)
  - Imperium: Saint Peter (2005 TV)
  - Imperium: Pompeii (2007 TV)
- Impetigore (2019)
- Impetuous Love in Action (2014)
- Impolite (1992)
- The Importance of Being Earnest: (1952 & 2002)
- Impossible (2015)
- The Impossible: (1965 & 2012)
- Impossible Love (1932)
- Impossible Monsters (2019)
- Impossible Object (1973)
- Impossible Things (2021)
- The Impossible Voyage (1904)
- The Imposter: (2008 & 2012)
- Impostor: (1921 & 2001)
- The Impostor: (1927 & 1944)
- The Impostors (1998)
- Impractical Jokers: The Movie (2020)
- Impregnated (2022)
- Impromptu: (1932 & 1991)
- Improper Channels (1981)
- Improper Conduct: (1984 & 1994)
- Impulse: (1954, 1974, 1984, 1990 & 2010)
- Impunity (2014)
- Imsai Arasan 23rd Pulikecei (2006)
- Imthihaan (1993)
- Imtihaan: (1949 & 1994)
- Imtihan (1974)

=== In ===
- In the Aisles (2018)
- In the Aisles of the Wild (1912)
- In America (2002)
- In the Army Now (1994)
- In the Basement (2014)
- In the Bedroom (2001)
- In a Better World (2010)
- The In Between (2022)
- In the Bleak Midwinter (1995)
- In the Blood: (1923, 1988, 2014 & 2016)
- In Bruges (2008)
- In China They Eat Dogs (1999)
- In Cold Blood (1967)
- In the Company of Men (1997)
- In Country (1989)
- In the Courtyard (2014)
- The In Crowd: (1988 & 2000)
- In Custody (1993)
- In the Cut (2003)
- In Darkness: (2009 & 2011)
- In Dreams (1999)
- In Dubious Battle (2016)
- In the Earth (2021)
- In the Electric Mist (2009)
- In Enemy Hands (2004)
- In Fear (2013)
- In the Folds of the Flesh (1970)
- In For a Murder (2021)
- In the French Style (1963)
- In Front of Your Face (2021)
- In a Glass Cage (1986)
- In the Gloaming (1997)
- In God We Tru$t (1980)
- In God We Trust (2013)
- In God's Hands (1998)
- In Good Company: (2000 & 2004)
- In the Good Old Summertime (1949)
- In the Grey (2026)
- In Harm's Way (1965)
- In the Heat of the Night (1967)
- In the Heart of the Sea (2015)
- In the Heat of the Sun (1994)
- In the Heights (2021)
- In Hell (2003)
- In Her Footsteps (2017)
- In Her Shoes (2005)
- In July (2000)
- In the Land of Blood and Honey (2012)
- In the Land of the Cactus (1913)
- In the Land of the Deaf (1992)
- In the Land of the Head Hunters (1914)
- In the Land of Women (2007)
- In Like Flint (1967)
- In Like Flynn (2018)
- In the Line of Fire (1993)
- In a Lonely Place (1950)
- In the Loop (2009)
- In the Lost Lands (2025)
- In Love and War (1996)
- In Love We Trust (2008)
- In the Mix (2005)
- In the Mood for Love (2000)
- In the Mouth of Madness (1995)
- In My Country (2004)
- In My Father's Den (2004)
- In Nacht und Eis (1912)
- In the Name of the Father: (1993 & 2006)
- In the Name of the King: (1924 & 2007)
- In the Name of the King 2: Two Worlds (2011)
- In the Name of the King 3: The Last Mission (2014)
- In Name Only (1939)
- In the Name of the Son: (2007 & 2012)
- In The Navy (1941)
- In the Nick of Time: (1911 & 1991 TV)
- In Old Arizona (1928)
- In Old Chicago (1938)
- In Olden Days (1952)
- In & Out (1997)
- In the Park (1914)
- In Praise of Love (2001)
- In the Presence of a Clown (1997) (TV)
- In Public (2001)
- In the Radiant City (2016)
- In the Realm of the Senses (1976)
- In Search of the Castaways (1962)
- In Search of Darkness (2019)
- In Search of Dr. Seuss (1994) (TV)
- In Search of Fellini (2017)
- In Search of Greatness (2018)
- In Search of Happiness (2005)
- In Search of a Midnight Kiss (2007)
- In Search of Noah's Ark (1976)
- In Search of Santa (2004)
- In Search of Tomorrow (2022)
- In the Shadow of the Moon (2007)
- In a Shallow Grave (1988)
- In Their Skin (2012)
- In Society (1944)
- In This Our Life (1942)
- In This World (2002)
- In the Tall Grass (2019)
- In Time (2011)
- In the Time of the Butterflies (2001)
- In Transit (2008)
- In the Valley of Elah (2007)
- In a Valley of Violence (2016)
- In Vanda's Room (2000)
- In a Violent Nature (2024)
- In the Wake of the Bounty (1933)
- In Which We Serve (1942)
- In the Winter Dark (1998)
- In a Year of 13 Moons (1978)
- The In-Laws: (1979 & 2003)

==== Ina–Inc ====
- Ina (1982)
- Ina Ka ng Anak Mo (1979)
- Inaam Dus Hazaar (1987)
- An Inaccurate Memoir (2012)
- Inactive, Americaʼs Silent Killer (2024 TV)
- Inadequate People (2010)
- Inadequate People 2 (2020)
- Inadmissible Evidence (1968)
- Inaindha Kaigal (1990)
- Inappropriate Comedy (2013)
- Inauguration of the Pleasure Dome (1954)
- Inazuma Eleven GO vs. Danbōru Senki W (2012)
- Inazuma Eleven GO: Kyūkyoku no Kizuna Gurifon (2011)
- Inazuma Eleven: Saikyō Gundan Ōga Shūrai (2010)
- Inba (2008)
- Inba Twinkle Lilly (2018)
- Inbetween Worlds (2014)
- The Inbetweeners Movie (2011)
- Inbred (2011)
- Incantation (2022)
- Incarnate (2016)
- Incendiary (2008)
- Incendiary: The Willingham Case (2011)
- Incendiary Blonde (1945)
- Incendies (2011)
- Incense (2003)
- Inception (2010)
- Incessant Visions (2011)
- Incest (1929)
- Inch'Allah (2012)
- Inchi Inchi Prem (2013)
- Inchon (1982)
- Incident (1948)
- The Incident: (1967, 1978, 1990 & 2014)
- Incident of the 7th Bamboo Flute (1936)
- Incident at Clovelly Cottage (1895)
- Incident on a Dark Street (1973 TV)
- Incident Light (2015)
- Incident at Loch Ness (2004)
- Incident at Oglala (1992)
- Incident at Raven's Gate (1988)
- Incident in San Francisco (1971 TV)
- Incident in a Small Town (1994 TV)
- Incitement (2019)
- An Incompetent Hero (1914)
- Incomplete Eclipse (1982)
- Inconceivable (2017)
- An Inconsistent Truth (2012)
- An Inconvenient Love (2022)
- An Inconvenient Sequel: Truth to Power (2017)
- An Inconvenient Tax (2010)
- An Inconvenient Truth (2006)
- An Inconvenient Truth...Or Convenient Fiction? (2007)
- The Incredible Burt Wonderstone (2013)
- The Incredible Hulk (2008)
- The Incredible Melting Man (1977)
- The Incredible Mr. Limpet (1964)
- The Incredible Professor Zovek (1972)
- The Incredible Shrinking Man (1957)
- The Incredible Shrinking Woman (1981)
- Incredibles series:
  - The Incredibles (2004)
  - Incredibles 2 (2018)
  - Incredibles 3 (2028)
- The Incredibly Strange Creatures Who Stopped Living and Became Mixed-Up Zombies (1964)
- The Incredibly True Adventure of Two Girls in Love (1995)
- Incubus: (1966 & 2006)
- The Incubus (1982)

==== Ind–Inl ====
- An Indecent Obsession (9185)
- Indecent Proposal (1993)
- Independence Day (1983)
- Independence Day (1996)
- Independence Day: Resurgence (2016)
- The Independent: (2000, 2007 & 2022)
- An Independent Life (1992)
- Indestructible Man (1956)
- India Song (1975)
- India Speaks (1933)
- Indian: (1996 & 2001)
- Indian 2 (2024)
- Indian 3 (TBD)
- The Indian in the Cupboard (1995)
- An Indian Love Story (1911)
- The Indian Runner (1991)
- Indian Summer: (1970, 1973, 1993 & 1996)
- The Indian Tomb: (1921, 1938 & 1959)
- An Indian's Loyalty (1913)
- Indiana Jones series:
  - Raiders of the Lost Ark (1981)
  - Indiana Jones and the Temple of Doom (1984)
  - Indiana Jones and the Last Crusade (1989)
  - Indiana Jones and the Kingdom of the Crystal Skull (2008)
  - Indiana Jones and the Dial of Destiny (2023)
- Indigenous (2014)
- Indiscreet: (1931 & 1958)
- Indiscretion of an American Wife (1953)
- Indochine (1992)
- Indra: (2002 & 2008)
- The Inerasable (2015)
- Infamous (2006 & 2020)
- Infection: (2003, 2004 & 2019)
- Infernal Affairs series:
  - Infernal Affairs (2002)
  - Infernal Affairs II (2003)
  - Infernal Affairs III (2003)
- The Infernal Cake Walk (1903)
- The Infernal Cauldron (1903)
- Infernal Machine (1933)
- Inferno: (1953, 1980, & 2016)
- L'Inferno (1911)
- Infestation (2009)
- Infidel (2020)
- Infidelity: (1917 & 1987 TV)
- The Infiltrator: (1995 & 2016)
- Infinite (2021)
- Infinity (1996)
- Infinity Pool (2023)
- Influenced (2026)
- Influencer (2022)
- Influencers (2025)
- The Informant! (2009)
- The Informer: (1912, 1929, 1935 & 2019)
- The Informers: (1963 & 2008)
- Ingagi (1930)
- The Inglorious Bastards (1978)
- Inglourious Basterds (2009)
- Ingmar Bergman Makes a Movie (1962)
- Ingrid Goes West (2017)
- Inherent Vice (2014)
- Inherit the Wind: (1960, 1988 TV & 1999 TV)
- Inheritance (2024)
- Inheritance (2025)
- The Inheritance (2024)
- The Inheritance or Fuckoffguysgoodday (1992)
- Initial D (2005)
- The Initiation (1984)
- Initiation Love (2015)
- The Initiation of Sarah: (1978 TV & 2006 TV)
- Initiation: Silent Night, Deadly Night 4 (1990)
- Injustice (2021)
- Ink (2009)
- Inkaar: (1943, 1977 & 2013)
- Inkheart (2009)
- Inkubus (2011)
- The Inkwell (1994)
- Inland Empire (2006)
- An Inlet of Muddy Water (1953)

==== Inn ====
- An Inn at Osaka (1954)
- Inn of the Damned (1975)
- Inn of Evil (1971)
- The Inn on the River (1962)
- Inn of the Sinful Daughters (1978)
- The Inn of the Sixth Happiness (1958)
- An Inn in Tokyo (1935)
- Inn for Trouble (1960)
- Inna de Yard: The Soul of Jamaica (2019)
- Innale (1990)
- Innale Innu (1977)
- Innalenkil Nale (1982)
- Innaleyude Baakki (1988)
- Innanu Aa Kalyanam (2011)
- Innathe Chintha Vishayam (2008)
- Innathe Program (1991)
- Inner City (1995)
- Inner Demons (2014)
- Inner Jellyfishes (2015)
- The Inner Life of Martin Frost (2007)
- Inner Sanctum: (1948 & 1991)
- Inner Workings (2016)
- Innerspace (1987)
- The Innkeepers (2011)
- Innocence: (1923, 2000, 2004, 2005, 2011, 2013 & 2020)
- Innocence of Muslims (2012)
- The Innocent: (1976, 1985, 1986, 1993, 1994 & 2022)
- An Innocent Adventuress (1919)
- An Innocent Affair (1948)
- Innocent Blood (1992)
- An Innocent Bridegroom (1913)
- An Innocent Kiss (2016)
- An Innocent Love (1982 TV)
- An Innocent Magdalene (1916)
- An Innocent Man (1989)
- Innocent Steps (2005)
- An Innocent Witch (1965)
- The Innocents: (1961, 1963, 2016 & 2021)
- Les Innocents (1987)

==== Ino–Ins ====
- Inochi (2002)
- Inochi no Chikyuu: Dioxin no Natsu (2001)
- Inquest: (1931 British, 1931 German & 1939)
- Inquest of Pilot Pirx (1979)
- Inquilaab: (1984 & 2002)
- Inquilinos (2018)
- Inquiring Nuns (1968)
- The Inquiry: (1986 & 2006)
- The Inquiry Film: A Report on the Mackenzie Valley Pipeline (1977)
- Inquisition (1976)
- Inqulab Zindabbad (1971)
- Insane (2016)
- Insanity (2015)
- Insatiable (1980)
- The Insect Woman (1963)
- Inseminoid (1981)
- Inside: (1996 TV, 2002, 2007, 2011, 2012, 2013, 2016, 2023 & 2024)
- Inside Daisy Clover (1965)
- Inside Deep Throat (2005)
- Inside the Girls (2014)
- Inside I'm Dancing (2004)
- Inside Job: (1946 & 2010)
- Inside Llewyn Davis (2013)
- Inside Man (2006)
- Inside Men (2015)
- Inside Monkey Zetterland (1992)
- Inside Nazi Germany (1938)
- Inside Out (1975)
- Inside Out (1986)
- Inside Out (2011)
- Inside Out (2015)
- Inside Out 2 (2024)
- Inside/Out (1997)
- The Insider (1999)
- Insidious series:
  - Insidious (2010)
  - Insidious: Chapter 2 (2013)
  - Insidious: Chapter 3 (2015)
  - Insidious: The Last Key (2018)
  - Insidious: The Red Door (2023)
  - Insidious: Out of the Further (2026)
- Insignificance (1985)
- Insomnia: (1997 & 2002)
- Insomnia Lover (2016)
- An Inspector Calls: (1954, 2015 British & 2015 Hong Kong)
- Inspector Clouseau (1968)
- Inspector Gadget (1999)
- Inspector Gadget 2 (2003)
- The Inspector General: (1933 & 1949)
- Inspiration (1915)
- Inspiration (1928)
- Inspiration (1931)
- Inspiration (1949)
- Instant Family (2018)
- Insitnct (1930)
- Instinct (1999)
- Instinct (2019)
- Insult (1932)
- The Insult (2017)
- Insyriated (2017)

==== Int–Inu ====
- Intact (2001)
- Intentions of Murder (1964)
- Interceptor (2022)
- Interiors (1978)
- Intermezzo: (1936 & 1939)
- Intermission (2003)
- The Intern: (2000 & 2015)
- Intern Academy (2004)
- Internal Affairs (1990)
- The International: (2006 & 2009)
- International House (1933)
- International Khiladi (1999)
- International Sweethearts of Rhythm (1986)
- International Velvet (1978)
- The Internship (2013)
- The Interpreter (2005)
- Intersection (1994)
- Interstate 60 (2002)
- Interstella 5555: The 5tory of the 5ecret 5tar 5ystem (2003)
- Interstellar (2014)
- Interview: (1971, 1973, 2000, 2003 & 2007)
- The Interview: (1998 & 2014)
- Interview with the Vampire (1994)
- Interviewing Monsters and Bigfoot (2020)
- Intervista (1987)
- Intimacy: (1966 & 2001)
- Intimate Lighting (1965)
- Intimate Relations: (1937, 1953 & 1996)
- The Intimate Stranger: (1956 & unfinished)
- Intimate Strangers: (1977 TV, 2004 & 2018)
- Into the Abyss (2011)
- Into the Arms of Strangers: Stories of the Kindertransport (2000)
- Into the Blue: (1950 & 2005)
- Into the Blue 2: The Reef (2009)
- Into the Dark (2012)
- Into the Deep: (2020 & 2025)
- Into the Forest (2015)
- Into Great Silence (2005)
- Into the Grizzly Maze (2015)
- Into the Mirror (2003)
- Into the Night: (1928 & 1985)
- Into the Storm: (2009 & 2014)
- Into the Sun: (1992 & 2005)
- Into Temptation (2009)
- Into the West (1992)
- Into the White (2012)
- Into the Wild (2007)
- Into the Woods (2014)
- Intolerable Cruelty (2003)
- Intolerance (1916)
- The Intouchables (2011)
- Intriga en Lima (1965)
- Introduction (2021)
- The Intruder: (1933, 1939, 1944, 1953, 1956, 1962, 1975, 1986, 1999, 2004, 2005, 2010, 2017, 2019 & 2020)
- Intruders: (2011, 2013 & 2015)
- Intrusion (2021)
- El Intruso (1999)
- Inu to Anata no Monogatari (2011)
- Inu no Kubiwa to Koroke to (2012)
- Inuji ni Seshi Mono (1986)
- Inuk (2010)
- Inuuvunga: I Am Inuk, I Am Alive (2004)
- Inuyasha series:
  - Inuyasha the Movie: Affections Touching Across Time (2001)
  - Inuyasha the Movie: The Castle Beyond the Looking Glass (2002)
  - Inuyasha the Movie: Swords of an Honorable Ruler (2003)
  - Inuyasha the Movie: Fire on the Mystic Island (2004)
- Inuyashiki (2018)

==== Inv ====
- Invader: (1992 & 2012)
- The Invader (1997)
- Invader Zim: Enter the Florpus (2019)
- Invaders from Mars: (1953 & 1986)
- Invaders from Space (1964)
- Invasion: (1966, 1997 TV, 2012, 2014, 2017 & 2020)
- Invasión (2024)
- The Invasion (2007)
- Invasion 1897 (2014)
- Invasion of the Animal People (1959)
- Invasion of Astro-Monster (1965)
- Invasion of the Bee Girls (1973)
- Invasion of the Blood Farmers (1972)
- Invasion of the Body Snatchers: (1956 & 1978)
- Invasion of the Bunny Snatchers (1992)
- Invasion from Inner Earth (1974)
- Invasion of the Neptune Men (1961)
- Invasion Planet Earth (2019)
- Invasion of the Pod People (2007)
- Invasion of Privacy (1996)
- Invasion Quartet (1961)
- Invasion of the Saucer Men (1957)
- Invasion of the Scream Queens (1992)
- Invasion of the Star Creatures (1962)
- Invasion U.S.A.: (1952 & 1985)
- Inventing the Abbotts (1997)
- Inventing Our Life: The Kibbutz Experiment (2010)
- Invention for Destruction (1958)
- The Invention of Lying (2009)
- The Inventor: (1981 & 2023)
- The Inventor Crazybrains and His Wonderful Airship (1905)
- Inversion (2016)
- Investigating Sex (2001)
- Investigation of a Citizen Above Suspicion (1970)
- Investigation of a Flame (2001)
- Investment (2013)
- Invictus (2009)
- Invincible: (2001, 2001 TV, 2006 & 2022)
- The Invincible Iron Man (2007)
- The Invincible Masked Rider (1963)
- The Invincible Piglet (2015)
- Invisible: (2011 & 2015)
- The Invisible: (2002 & 2007)
- Invisible Agent (1942)
- Invisible Avenger (1958)
- The Invisible Avenger (1954)
- Invisible Battalion (2017 TV)
- Invisible Beauty (2023)
- The Invisible Circus (2001)
- Invisible Ghost (1941)
- The Invisible Informer (1946)
- The Invisible Man: (1933 & 2020)
- The Invisible Man Returns (1940)
- The Invisible Maniac (1990)
- An Invisible Sign (2010)
- The Invisible War (2012)
- Invisible Waves (2006)
- Invisible Wings (2007)
- The Invisible Woman: (1940, 1969, 1983 TV & 2013)
- Invitation: (1952 & 2008)
- The Invitation: (1973, 2015 & 2022)
- Invitation to the Dance (1956)
- Invitation to a Gunfighter (1964)
- The Invite (2026)

=== Io ===
- Io (2019)
- Io amo Andrea (2000)
- Io capitano (2023)
- Io che amo solo te (2015)
- Io con te non ci sto più (1983)
- Io e il re (1995)
- Io e lui (1973)
- Io e mia sorella (1987)
- Io e mio fratello (2023)
- Io e Spotty (2022)
- Io non protesto, io amo (1967)
- Io non spezzo... rompo (1971)
- Io piaccio (1955)
- Io sono il capataz (1950)
- Io sono Mia (2019)
- Io sono Tempesta (2018)
- Io sono Tony Scott (2012)
- Io sto bene (2020)
- Io ti amo (1968)
- Iodine (2009)
- Iodo (1977)
- Iona (2015)

=== Ip–Iq ===
- Ip Man series:
  - Ip Man (2008)
  - Ip Man 2 (2010)
  - Ip Man 3 (2015)
  - Ip Man 4: The Finale (2019)
- Ip Man: The Final Fight (2013)
- Ip Man: Kung Fu Master (2019)
- Ipaglaban Mo: The Movie (1995)
- Ipagpatawad Mo (1991)
- iParty with Victorious (2011) (TV)
- The IPCRESS File (1965)
- Iphigenia (1977)
- Ipinanganak Na ang Taong Papatay sa Iyo (2000)
- Ipolochagos Natassa (1970)
- Ippadai Vellum (2017)
- Ippadikku En Kadhal (2007)
- Ippadiyum Oru Penn (1975)
- Ippodromi all'alba (1950)
- Iqaluit (2016)
- Iqbal (2005)
- Iqraar by Chance (2006)

=== Ir ===
==== Ira ====
- Ira (2018)
- Ira & Abby (2006)
- Ira Laga Wadi (2013)
- Ira Thedunna Manushyar (1981)
- Iracema: (1917 & 1949)
- Iracema: Uma Transa Amazônica (1974)
- Irada: (1991 & 2017)
- Irada Pakka (2010)
- Iraivan (2023)
- Iraivan Kodutha Varam (1978)
- Iran: Hot Tea, Cool Conversations (2008)
- Irandam Kuththu (2020)
- Irandam Ulagam (2013)
- Irandam Ulagaporin Kadaisi Gundu (2019)
- Irandu Mugam (2010)
- Iranium (2011)
- Iraniyan (1999)
- Iraq in Fragments (2006)
- Iraq for Sale: The War Profiteers (2006)
- Irati (2022)
- Iratta (2023)
- Irattai Roja (1996)
- Irattakuttikalude Achan (1997)
- Iravan (2023)
- Iravin Nizhal (2022)
- Iravukku Aayiram Kangal (2018)
- Iravum Pagalum (1965)
- Iravum Pagalum Varum (2015)

==== Irc–Irm ====
- Irca's Romance (1936)
- Ireland a Nation (1914)
- Ireland Will Be Free (1920)
- Irena do domu! (1955)
- Irena's Vow (2023)
- Irene: (1926, 1940, 2002 & 2009)
- Irene of Gold (1923)
- Irene in Time (2009)
- Irene in Trouble (1953)
- Irikku M.D. Akathundu (1991)
- Irina (2018)
- Irina Palm (2007)
- Iris: (1916, 1987, 2001, 2004, 2014 & 2016)
- Iris in Bloom (2011)
- Iris and the Lieutenant (1946)
- Iris: The Movie (2010)
- Iris the Movie: Full Energy!! (2024)
- Irish Destiny (1926)
- Irish Eyes Are Smiling (1944)
- Irish Hearts: (1927 & 1934)
- Irish Luck: (1925 & 1939)
- Irish for Luck (1936)
- Irish and Proud of It (1936)
- Irish Tour '74 (2011)
- Irish Wish (2024)
- The Irishman: (1978 & 2019)
- Iriston's Son (1959)
- Irkalla: Gilgamesh's Dream (2025)
- Irma la Douce (1963)
- Irma Vep (1997)

==== Iro ====
- Iron Angel (1964)
- Iron Bodyguard (1973)
- Iron Boy (2026)
- Iron City Blues (2008)
- Iron Doors (2010)
- Iron Eagle series:
  - Iron Eagle (1986)
  - Iron Eagle II (1988)
  - Aces: Iron Eagle III (1992)
  - Iron Eagle on the Attack (1995)
- Iron Earth, Copper Sky (1987)
- Iron Fisted Eagle's Claw (1979)
- Iron Flower (1958)
- The Iron Giant (1999)
- Iron to Gold (1922)
- Iron Gustav (1958)
- The Iron Heart: (1917 & 1920)
- The Iron Heel (1919)
- The Iron Heel of Oligarchy (1999)
- Iron Invader (2011 TV)
- Iron Island (2005)
- Iron Ivan (2014)
- Iron Jawed Angels (2004 TV)
- Iron Justice (1915)
- Iron Ladies of Liberia (2007)
- The Iron Lady (2012)
- Iron Lord (2010)
- Iron Lung (2026)
- Iron Maiden: Flight 666 (2009)
- Iron Man: (1931, 1951, 2008 & 2009)
- Iron Man 2 (2010)
- Iron Man 3 (2013)
- Iron Man & Captain America: Heroes United (2014)
- Iron Man & Hulk: Heroes United (2013)
- Iron Man: Rise of Technovore (2013)
- The Iron Mask (1929)
- Iron Maze (1991)
- Iron Monkey: (1977 & 1993)
- Iron Monkey 2 (1996)
- Iron Mountain Trail (1953)
- The Iron Orchard (2018)
- Iron Ridge (2008)
- Iron Road (2009 TV)
- Iron & Silk (1990)
- Iron Sky (2012)
- Iron Sky: The Coming Race (2018)
- Iron Wall (2006)
- Iron Warrior (1987)
- Iron Will (1994)
- Iron Wills (1923)
- Iron Winter (2025)
- The Iron Woman (1916)
- Ironclad (2011)
- Ironclad: Battle for Blood (2014)
- Ironheart (1992)
- Ironmaster (1983)
- Ironweed (1987)
- The Irony of Fate (1975)

==== Irr ====
- Irradiated (2020)
- Irrational Man (2015)
- Irreconcilable Differences (1984)
- The Irrefutable Truth about Demons (2000)
- Irreplaceable (2016)
- Irreplaceable You (2018)
- Irresistible: (2006 & 2020)
- Irresistible Angel: Suck It All Up (2003)
- Irresistible Catherine (1957)
- Irresistible Force (1993)
- Irresistible Seducers (2022)
- Irréversible (2002)
- Irrlicht (1919)

==== Iru ====
- Iru Kodugal (1969)
- Iru Malargal (1967)
- Iru Medhaigal (1984)
- Iru Mugan (2016)
- Iru Sagodharigal (1957)
- Iru Sahodarargal (1936)
- Iru Thuruvam (1971)
- Iru Vallavargal (1966)
- Irudhi Pakkam (2021)
- Irudhi Suttru (2016)
- Irugapatru (2023)
- Irugu Porugu (1963)
- Irukku Aana Illai (2014)
- Irul (2021)
- Irulum Oliyum (1971)
- Irumanam Kalanthal Thirumanam (1960)
- Irumban (2023)
- Irumbazhikal (1979)
- Irumbu Kuthirai (2014)
- Irumbu Manithan (2020)
- Irumbu Pookkal (1991)
- Irumbu Thirai: (1960 & 2018)
- Irumbukkottai Murattu Singam (2010)
- Irupatham Noottandu (1987)
- Irupathiyonnaam Noottaandu (2019)
- Iruttinte Athmavu (1967)
- Iruttu (2019)
- Iruttu Araiyil Murattu Kuththu (2020)
- Iruvar (1997)
- Iruvar Mattum (2006)
- Iruvar Ondranal (2015)
- Iruvar Ullam: (1963 & 2021)
- Iruvattam Manavaatti (2005)
- Iruvudellava Bittu (2018)

=== Is ===
- Is Anybody There? (2008)
- Is Divorce a Failure? (1923)
- Is Everybody Happy? (1929)
- Is Everybody Happy? (1943)
- Is Genesis History? (2017)
- Is Geraldine an Angel? (1963)
- Is God Is (2026)
- Is Harry on the Boat? (2001 TV)
- Is He My Girlfriend? (2019)
- Is It Always Right to Be Right? (1970)
- Is It Clear, My Friend? (2000)
- Is It College Yet? (2002 TV)
- Is It Easy to Be Young? (1987)
- Is It Fall Yet? (2000 TV)
- Is It Just Me? (2010)
- Is It My Turn (2012)
- Is It Wrong to Try to Pick Up Girls in a Dungeon?: Arrow of the Orion (2019)
- Is Life Worth Living? (1921)
- Is Love Everything? (1924)
- Is Matrimony a Failure? (1922)
- Is Money Everything? (1923)
- Is My Face Red? (1932)
- Is My Palm Read (1933)
- Is Paris Burning? (1966)
- Is Raat Ki Subah Nahin (1996)
- Is Spiritualism a Fraud? (1906)
- Is That Black Enough for You?!? (2022)
- Is There Anybody There? (1976 TV)
- Is There Justice? (1931)
- Is There Life Out There? (1994 TV)
- Is There Sex After Death? (1971)
- Is This Thing On? (2025)
- Is Your Daughter Safe? (1927)
- Is Your Honeymoon Really Necessary? (1953)
- Is Zat So? (1927)

==== Isa–Isu ====
- Isa Kremer: The People's Diva (2000)
- Isaac (2019)
- Isaac in America: A Journey with Isaac Bashevis Singer (1986)
- Isabel (1968)
- Isabel's Choice (1981) (TV)
- Isabelita (1940)
- Isabella (1988)
- Isabella (2006)
- Isabelle (2011)
- Isabelle (2018)
- Isabelle Eberhardt (1991)
- Isadora (1968)
- Isadora Duncan, the Biggest Dancer in the World (1966) (TV)
- Isai (2015)
- Isai Paadum Thendral (1986)
- Isakki (2013)
- Isakkinte Ithihasam (2019)
- Isekai Quartet: The Movie – Another World (2022)
- Iseta: Behind the Roadblock (2008)
- Ish (2025)
- Ishaara: (1943 & 1964)
- Ishaqzaade (2012)
- Ishi: The Last of His Tribe (1978 TV)
- Ishk Ishk Ishk (1974)
- Ishkq in Paris (2013)
- Ishq: (1997, 2012, 2019 & 2021)
- Ishq Brandy (2014)
- Ishq Click (2016)
- Ishq Forever (2016)
- Ishq Garaari (2013)
- Ishq Hai Tumse (2004)
- Ishq Junoon (2016)
- Ishq Ke Parindey (2015)
- Ishq Khuda (2013)
- Ishq Mein Jeena Ishq Mein Marna (1994)
- Ishq Par Zor Nahin (1970)
- Ishq Pashmina (2022)
- Ishq Positive (2016)
- Ishq Vishk (2003)
- Ishq Vishk Rebound (2024)
- Ishq Wala Love (2014)
- Ishqedarriyaan (2015)
- Ishqiya (2010)
- Ishrat Made in China (2022)
- Ishta (2011)
- Ishtakamya (2016)
- Ishtam: (2001 Malayalam, 2001 Telugu & 2012)
- Ishtar (1987)
- Ishti (2016)
- Isi & Ossi (2020)
- Isi Ka Naam Duniya Hai (1962)
- Isi Ka Naam Zindagi (1992)
- Isi Life Mein...! (2010)
- Iska's Journey (2007)
- Iski Topi Uske Sarr (1998)
- Iskra (2017)
- Iskul Bukol 20 Years After: The Ungasis and Escaleras Adventure (2008)
- Isla Blanca (2018)
- Islam: What the West Needs to Know (2006)
- The Island: (1980 & 2005)
- Island of the Blue Dolphins (1964)
- Island of Death (1976)
- The Island of Doctor Agor (1971)
- Island of Doomed Men (1940)
- The Island of Dr. Moreau: (1977 & 1996)
- Island of the Fishmen (1979)
- Island of Lost Men (1939)
- Island of Lost Souls: (1932 & 2007)
- Island in the Sky: (1938 & 1953)
- Island in the Sun (1957)
- Island of Terror (1966)
- The Island at the Top of the World (1974)
- The Isle (2000)
- The Isle of the Dead (1945)
- Isle of Dogs (2018)
- Isle of Flowers (1989)
- Ism (2016)
- Ismael (2013)
- Ismael's Ghosts (2017)
- Ismail Yassine in the Navy (1957)
- Isn't Anyone Alive? (2012)
- Isn't It Delicious (2013)
- Isn't It Romantic (2019)
- Isn't It Romantic? (1948)
- Isn't It Shocking? (1973 TV)
- Isn't Life Wonderful (1924)
- Isn't Life Wonderful! (1953)
- Isn't She Great (2000)
- Isola (2000)
- Isolation (2005)
- Isolation (2009)
- Iso lo (1994)
- Isoroku (2011)
- Ispade Rajavum Idhaya Raniyum (2019)
- Ispiritista: Itay, May Moomoo (2005)
- Israel: A Right to Live (1967)
- Issues 101 (2002)
- Istanbul (1957)
- Istanbul Beneath My Wings (1996)
- Istoria mias zois (1965)
- Isusumbong Kita sa Tatay Ko... (1999)

=== It ===
- It: (1927, 1990 & 2017)
- It! (1967)
- It Always Rains on Sunday (1947)
- It Came from Beneath the Sea (1955)
- It Came from Hollywood (1982)
- It Came from Outer Space (1953)
- It Came from the Sky (1999) (TV)
- It Chapter Two (2019)
- It Comes at Night (2017)
- It Conquered the World (1956)
- It Could Happen to You: (1937, 1939, & 1994)
- It Couldn't Happen Here (1988)
- It Ends (2025)
- It Ends with Us (2024)
- It Follows (2015)
- It Had to Be You: (1947 & 2000)
- It Had to Be You! (2000)
- It Happened on 5th Avenue (1947)
- It Happened in Broad Daylight (1958)
- It Happened in Brooklyn (1947)
- It Happened Here (1966)
- It Happened at the Inn (1943)
- It Happened at Lakewood Manor (1977) (TV)
- It Happened One Night (1934)
- It Happened at the Police Station: (1954 & 1963)
- It Happened Tomorrow (1944)
- It Happened at the World's Fair (1963)
- It Might Get Loud (2009)
- It Runs in the Family (2003)
- It Should Happen to You (1954)
- It Started with a Kiss (1959)
- It Started in Naples (1960)
- It Takes Two: (1982, 1988 & 1995)
- It Waits (2005)
- It Was a Wonderful Life (1993)
- It! The Terror from Beyond Space (1958)
- It's About You (2012)
- It's in the Air (1938)
- It's Alive: (1974 & 2009)
- It's Alive! (1969)
- It's All About Love (2003)
- It's All Gone Pete Tong (2005)
- It's All True (unreleased)
- It's All True: Based on an Unfinished Film by Orson Welles (1993)
- It's Always Fair Weather (1955)
- It's in the Bag: (1936 & 1944)
- It's in the Bag! (1945)
- It's Complicated (2009)
- It's a Disaster (2012)
- It's Entertainment (2014)
- It's a Gift (1934)
- It's Great to Be Alive (1933)
- It's a Great Feeling (1949)
- It’s Here (2019)
- It's In the Water (1997)
- It's Kind of a Funny Story (2011)
- It's a Long Road (1998)
- It's a Mad, Mad, Mad, Mad World (1963)
- It's My Party (1996)
- It's Never Over, Jeff Buckley (2025)
- It's Not Just You, Murray! (1964)
- It's Only Money (1962)
- It's the Rage (2000)
- It's a Small World: (1935 & 1950)
- It's a Very Merry Muppet Christmas Movie (2002)
- It's a Wonderful Afterlife (2010)
- It's a Wonderful Knife (2023)
- It's a Wonderful Life (1946)
- It's a Wonderful World: (1939 & 1956)
- It's What's Inside (2024)

==== Ita–Itz ====
- The Italian (1915)
- The Italian (2005)
- An Italian in America (1967)
- The Italian Barber (1911)
- Italian for Beginners (2000)
- The Italian Brigands (1962)
- The Italian Connection (1972)
- The Italian Job: (1969 & 2003)
- The Italian Key (2011)
- An Italian Name (2015)
- Italian Race (2016)
- An Italian Romance (2004)
- The Italian Straw Hat (1928)
- Italianamerican (1974)
- Italians (2009)
- The Italians They Are Crazy (1958)
- Italiencele (2004)
- Italo (2014)
- Italy in a Day (2014)
- Italy Has Awakened (1927)
- An Itch in Time (1943)
- Item 47 (2012)
- Item One (1956)
- Itha Innu Muthal (1984)
- Itha Ivide Vare (1977)
- Itha Oru Dhikkari (1981)
- Itha Oru Snehagatha (1997)
- Itha Oru Theeram (1979)
- Itha Samayamayi (1987)
- Ithaa Oru Manushyan (1978)
- Ithaanente Vazhi (1978)
- Ithaca (2015)
- Ithalukalkappuram (2017)
- Ithaya Geetham (1950)
- Ithihasa (2014)
- Ithile Iniyum Varu (1986)
- Ithile Vannavar (1980)
- Ithinumappuram (2015)
- Ithiri Poove Chuvannapoove (1984)
- Ithramathram (2012)
- Ithrayum Kaalam (1987)
- Ithu Engal Neethi (1988)
- Ithu Manushyano (1973)
- Ithu Nalla Thamasha (1985)
- Ithu Namma Veedu (2017)
- Ithu Nammude Katha (2011)
- Ithu Njangalude Katha (1982)
- Ithu Oru Thudakkom Mathram (1986)
- Ithu Pathiramanal (2013)
- Ithu Thaanda Police (2016)
- Ithubaaru (1987)
- Ithum Oru Jeevitham (1982)
- Iti Mrinalini (2011)
- Iti Srikanta (2004)
- Itihaas: (1987 & 1997)
- Itihas (2002)
- Itinerary of a Spoiled Child (1988)
- Itlu Sravani Subramanyam (2001)
- Ito: A Diary of an Urban Priest (2010)
- Itsuka dokusho suruhi (2005)
- Itsuka no Kimi e (2007)
- Itsy Bitsy Spider (1992)
- Itt a szabadság! (1991)
- Ittafaq: (1969, 2001 & 2017)
- Itty Bitty Titty Committee (2007)
- Ittymaani: Made in China (2019)
- Itutumba Ka ng Tatay Ko (2024)
- Itzia, Tango & Cacao (2023)

=== Iv–Iz ===
- Ival Draupadi (2000)
- Ival Eevazhi Ithu Vare (1980)
- Ival Oru Naadody (1979)
- Ivan (1932, 2002 & 2017)
- Ivan and Alexandra (1952)
- Ivan Brovkin on the State Farm (1959)
- Ivan & Ivana (2011)
- Ivan and Marya (1974)
- Ivan, Son of the White Devil (1953)
- Ivan the Terrible (1917)
- Ivan the Terrible, Part I (1944)
- Ivan the Terrible, Part II (1959)
- Ivan Tsarevich and the Gray Wolf (2011)
- Ivan Tsarevich and the Gray Wolf 2 (2013)
- Ivan Tsarevich and the Gray Wolf 3 (2016)
- Ivan Vasilievich: Back to the Future (1973)
- Ivan's Childhood (1962)
- Ivanhoe: (1913 American, 1913 British, 1952 & 1982 TV)
- Ivanhoe, the Norman Swordsman (1971)
- Ivanna: (1959 & 2022)
- Ivanov (2010)
- Ivans Xtc (2000)
- Ivanuku Thannila Gandam (2015)
- Ivar: (1980 & 2003)
- Ivargal Varungala Thoongal (1987)
- Ivide (2015)
- Ivide Ee Theerathu (1985)
- Ivide Ingane (1984)
- Ivide Kattinu Sugandam (1979)
- Ivide Thudangunnu (1984)
- Ivy: (1947 & 2015)
- The Ivy (2025)
- IXE-13 (1971)
- Iyer the Great (1990)
- Iyobinte Pusthakam (2014)
- IZO (2004)
- Izu no odoriko (1954)
- Izu no Odoriko (1974)
- Izzat: (1937, 1960, 1968, 1991 & 2005)
- Izzie's Way Home (2016)
- Izzy Gets the F*ck Across Town (2017)
- Izzy Lyon: The Unspun Truth (2022)
- Izzy and Moe (1985)

Previous: List of films: H Next: List of films: J–K

== See also ==
- Lists of films
- Lists of actors
- List of film and television directors
- List of documentary films
- List of film production companies
