= Get The Fuck Up Radio =

American radio program

Get the Fuck Up Radio (GTFU) was an internet and pirate radio radio program located in Los Angeles. The program was broadcast every Monday night from 2000 to 2010 by Aaron Farley and Jeremy Weiss so the two photographers could hang out weekly. The format included band interviews, live musical performances, and prank calls. A few years later, Annie Hardy was added to the team. Other regulars to the show include Luis the Humble Mexican, Chrississippi, Curtis Mead, Kevin Kusatsu, Devin Foley, Jentern and Travis Keller. One notable guest on the show was Sean Carlson, who they referred to as "High School Sean" because of his young age.

In 2000, Weiss met Aaron North and Travis Kelley of Buddyhead in San Francisco. North and Kelly encouraged Weiss to move to Los Angeles, and join Buddyhead, which included the Buddyhead radioshow. After the Dot-com bubble, financial support for Buddyhead plummeted, and Weiss and fellow photographer Aaron Farley developed GTFU as an spin-off radioshow. The concept for their version of the show was based on the television show WKRP in Cincinnati.

The show originally aired on internet station Kill Radio. Then the show aired from 8:00-11:00pm PST every Monday night on Little Radio. The last couple of years of the show were broadcast out of a secret location in Silver Lake on Monday nights at 7-10PM on GTFURadio.com.

GTFU Radio has been featured in LA Weekly, LA Record and Swindle Magazine. Some past guests of GTFU include Say Anything, Franz Ferdinand, Saves the Day, Giant Drag, The Libertines, Piebald, Mars Volta, Matt Costa, Rilo Kiley and former Guns N' Roses guitarist Slash. GTFU also hosted the first live performances of Los Angeles' Warpaint.
