= Annie Hardy =

American musician

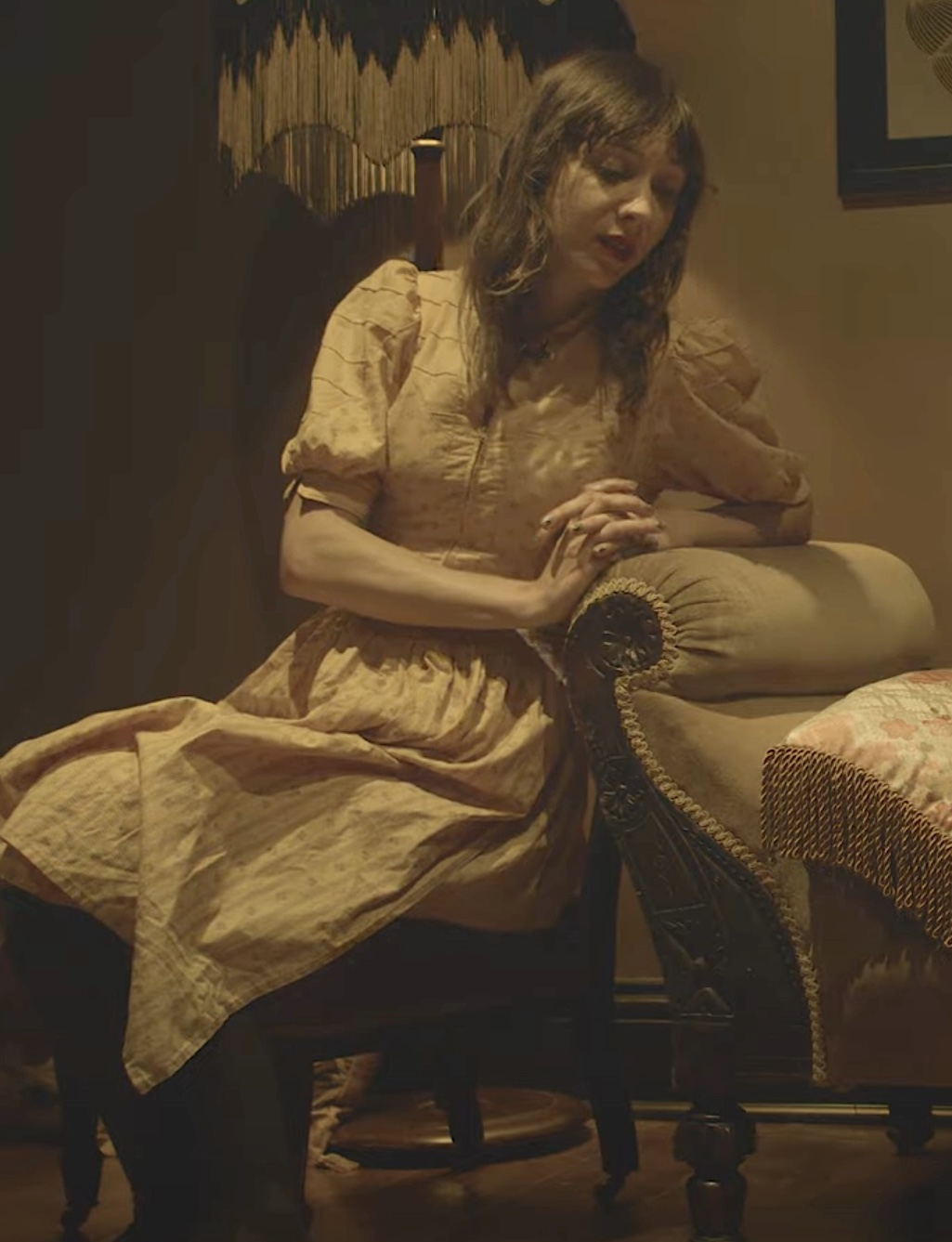
- Hardy performing in 2022

Background information
- Born: Annie Summer Hardy; June 5, 1981 (age 45); San Clemente, California, U.S.
- Genres: Indie rock; alternative rock
- Occupations: Singer; songwriter; musician; actress
- Instruments: Vocals; guitar; piano; keyboards; drums
- Years active: 2003–present
- Labels: Kickball; Full Psycho Records

Annie Summer Hardy (born June 5, 1981) is an American musician and podcast host. She is the lead vocalist, guitarist, and songwriter of the indie rock band Giant Drag, which she formed in 2003. After releasing their debut EP, Lemona (2004), the band was briefly signed to Kickball Records, a subsidiary of Interscope, who distributed their debut album, Hearts and Unicorns (2005). Their second album, Waking Up Is Hard to Do (2013), was independently released through the band's own label, Full Psycho Records.

Hardy was voted one of NME's "50 Coolest People," and has received major news coverage in NME, Spin, MTV News and Rolling Stone, among others. She started her own record label October 2011 launching Full Psycho Records, TV & Crafts in a soft launch via her YouTube channel. She is known for her quick-witted stage persona and retorts to insults. Hardy released her first solo album, Rules, in 2017.

In addition to music, Hardy also occasionally worked as an actress; she appeared in Spike Jonze's short film I'm Here (2010), and later starred as a semi-fictionalized version of herself in the 2021 horror film Dashcam.

== Early life ==
Hardy was born in San Clemente, California, to Molly, a part-time playwright and director, and James Kent Hardy. Her mother is a Catholic of Irish descent, and her father is of Jewish ancestry. Hardy has stated that she discovered her father's Jewish ancestry through a DNA test; her paternal grandmother was ethnically Ashkenazi Jewish, but religiously a born-again Christian. Hardy also stated she has small amounts of Punjabi Indian, Sardinian, and Italian ancestry.

Hardy was raised in Orange County, and began taking guitar lessons at age nine. In the tenth grade, Hardy went to a boarding school in Ojai of which she says: "There was nothing to do there. I was acting there and I was in the choir." It was there that she met another girl who also had a guitar. According to Hardy, "Her dad was teaching her Beatles songs. So we learned how to play together. I learned a lot by studying piano books that had chord charts. I bought some rock books. Around then I learned how to play and sing at the same time."

After high school, Hardy did extra work for money and pursued a musical career. In 1999, she moved to Los Angeles. At some point, Hardy worked as a DJ at Beauty Bar. Hardy continued looking for band members and was involved in many potential bands, including Mein Coif, with friends Mike Felix (now drummer of Toys That Kill) and Max Humphrey (bassist of The Adored).

== Career ==
=== Music ===
==== Giant Drag ====
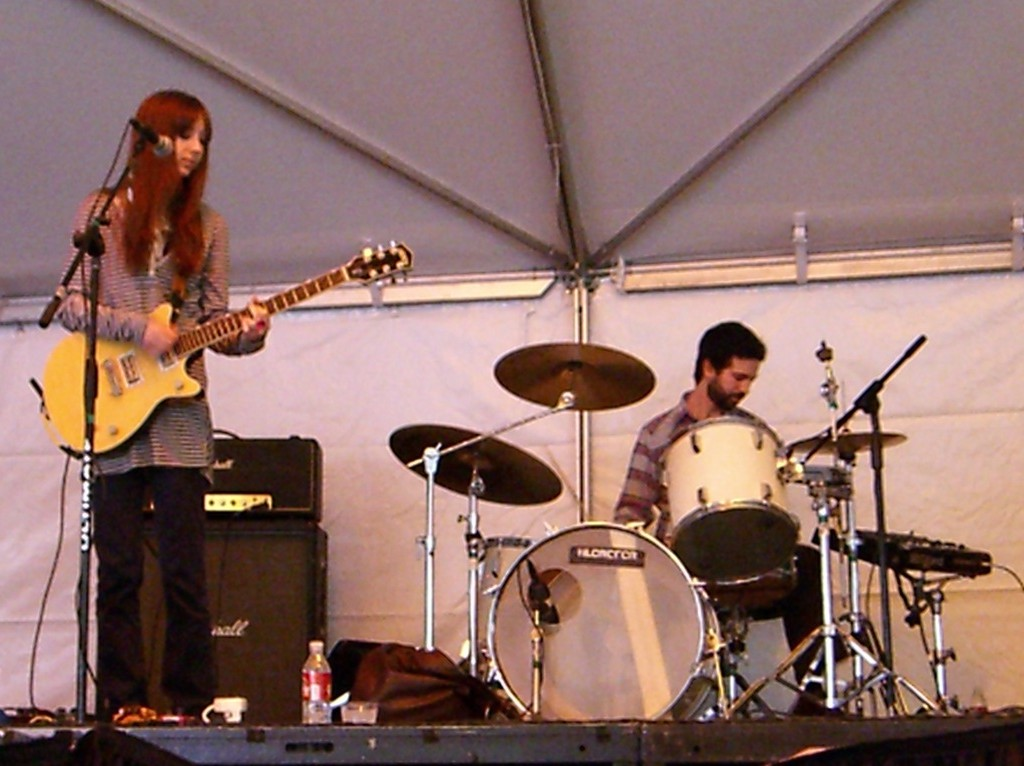
Hardy (left) performing in Giant Drag at South by Southwest, 2006

In May 2003, Hardy and Micah Calabrese formed Giant Drag. Hardy's mother, who had worked with Calabrese at an internet company, had initially attempted to get Hardy and Calabrese to meet, but the two eventually met through mutual friends who began dating. They began recording music together, including covers of Journey's "Who's Crying Now" and the Beach Boys' "God Only Knows."

According to Hardy, "One day I said, 'Hey dude, you know all my songs. Why don't you be my drummer?' He agreed." The two considered hiring a bassist to join the group, but instead, Calabrese began performing bass using a synthesizer with one hand, while drumming with the other. Performing both roles limited Calabrese's drumming performance, but soon became a stylistic element of the duo's music. Giant Drag's first show was on June 4, 2003, at the Scene in Los Angeles, one month after they decided to be a band.

On January 25, 2005, Giant Drag released the EP Lemona on Wichita Recordings. This was followed on September 13, 2005, by their first full-length release, Hearts and Unicorns, on Kickball Records.

In 2007, Giant Drag covered Madonna's "Oh Father" for a charity/tribute Madonna album that benefited AIDS assistance efforts in Africa, titled Through the Wilderness.

The Swan Song EP was released on February 16, 2010. Also in 2010, Giant Drag's cover of "Wicked Game" by Chris Isaak was used in a commercial for Nip/Tuck on the FX Network. Giant Drag originals have been featured on television shows including The L-Word, Jericho and the movie A Love Song for Bobby Long starring Scarlett Johansson and John Travolta.

In 2013, the band released their second studio album, Waking Up Is Hard to Do. Commenting on the album, Hardy said: "On Hearts and Unicorns everything was a complete mystery to me. I put zero thought into writing songs – I was like, "oh, this is just how they come out. They're beamed to me from a spaceship and they come out finished and then I add a cat solo". Now I'm aware that I have some control over the situation and I put a little more thought into if I was a listener how I'd like to hear it, I guess." The same year, Hardy began recording material under the projects PnP (short for "party and play") and Annie Hardy and the Psychos, both featuring her friend and bandmate Monica Barciki.

In 2020, while Hardy was quarantined for COVID-19 restrictions in London prior to shooting the horror film Dashcam, in which she starred, she recorded material for Giant Drag's studio album at The Libertines' recording studio, The Albion Rooms, alongside another secret project. The material was recorded with Jamie Reynolds, formerly of the English rock group Klaxons. Commenting on the recording, Hardy stated: "I think I was an idiot savant before, or just an idiot – I'm not sure. I could write songs but I wasn't really invested. I was always really sedated, taking a lot of pills and whatnot. Now I'm very present and I know what I'm doing for the first time." In 2021, the band independently issued the EPs Lemona and Swan Song as a joint release on vinyl for the first time.

In June 2022, Giant Drag, featuring Hardy and drummer Collin Deatherage, released the track "Devil Inside", which had previously been recorded for their EP Band Car; the track was featured as a promotional single for Dashcam.

==== Solo work ====
Hardy released her debut solo album, Rules, on April 7, 2017, through her label Full Psycho Records. A single, "High Forever," was released in March 2017 with an official music video. Eric Vanderhoof of Pitchfork gave the album a favorable review, writing that "Hardy fills every song with palpable grief. It is a brave, angry, and mournful album that captures the manic energy of her musical past."

On January 19, 2020, Hardy self-released the EP Saves, also through Full Psycho Records. In 2024, she released her second solo EP, Cross Bearer.

==== Collaborations ====
Hardy provided guest vocals on the song "Pink Cellphone" from the 2006 Deftones album Saturday Night Wrist. On April 26, 2007, Hardy performed the song "Just Like Honey" onstage with The Jesus and Mary Chain for their reunion show the day before Coachella.

Hardy contributed vocals to The Icarus Line's 2010 record Wildlife and performed a number of the band's live appearances on organ. She also appeared at the debut live performance of Crosses (featuring Deftones singer and guitarist Chino Moreno) in Pomona, California, performing the Giant Drag track "Swan Song".

=== Film and television ===
In February 2010, she made her screen debut I'm Here, a short film directed by Spike Jonze. In October 2011, she made a musical appearance on the 2011 Halloween episode of Pretty Little Liars. In 2017, Hardy appeared as herself in a supporting role in The Icarus Line Must Die, a semi-fictionalized biographical film about Joe Cardamone, the singer of the band The Icarus Line.

In 2021, Hardy starred in the lead role in Rob Savage's Blumhouse-produced computer screen horror film Dashcam. Hardy portrays a semi-fictionalized version of herself in the film, starring as a musician who livestreams herself during a nighttime road trip in England, where she encounters a series of terrifying events. The project was developed by Savage, an acquaintance of Hardy's; he proposed the idea based on a series of livestream videos Hardy had uploaded to YouTube while driving in Los Angeles, titled Band Car, in which she works out song ideas before the viewers. The film was shot in Margate, England in late 2020. Dashcam premiered as part of the Midnight Madness section of the Toronto International Film Festival in September 2021, and had its premiere in the United Kingdom at the BFI London Film Festival that October. The film received mixed reviews; most viewers praised its scariness and visual format, but felt that Hardy's character failed to carry the film and even undermined it by being too grating and unlikeable.

=== Other endeavors ===
Hardy frequently co-hosted the Get The Fuck Up (GTFU) radio show with Jeremy Weiss and Aaron Farley, beginning in 2009.

In October 31, 2011, Hardy launched her own independent music label, Full Psycho Records.

== Influences ==
Hardy has named various rock and punk bands as influences, including The Beatles, Babes in Toyland, Hole, The Misfits, the Descendents, and Danzig.

== Personal life ==
In December 2008, Hardy revealed that she had been diagnosed with fibromyalgia. She was prescribed the opioid drug Norco to treat her pain, which resulted in a decade-long addiction to the substance. Hardy stated that at one point, she was taking approximately 60 tablets of the drug per day. After several rehabilitation stints, she recovered and became sober from the drug. She commented that, after reaching sobriety, she realized that her "pain levels were nowhere near as bad as I thought they were. When you are taking that much painkiller you have no grasp of what your natural pain levels are." Hardy attributed her muscle pain and fibromyalgia diagnosis to performing with a Gretsch guitar that was too heavy for her body to support: "I didn't realize that through all the touring and sitting in fucked-up chairs and the most painful part of getting onstage every night, was that my guitar was so fucking heavy. I never explored that aspect. I'm pretty small and now I have a Dan Armstrong guitar that is 5 pounds and it sounds rad and it looks cool – and it doesn't hurt at all. It seems dumb in retrospect."

In 2022, Hardy openly discussed her codependent addiction to Adderall that she developed with a "controlling, manipulative" boyfriend following the release of Giant Drag's second album, Waking Up Is Hard to Do (2013). Hardy's Adderall abuse eventually progressed to an addiction to methamphetamine. After separating from this boyfriend, Hardy subsequently began an "intense, tempestuous" relationship with Robert Paulson, a rapper known by his stage name Cadalack Ron. In early March 2015, Hardy and Paulson gave birth to a son named Silvio. Silvio died at the age of 17 days of SIDS (sudden infant death syndrome). Paulson subsequently died of a drug overdose in January 2016.

Hardy described herself as a "begrudging Christian."

== Discography ==
Giant Drag

- Lemona (2004)
- Hearts and Unicorns (2005)
- Swan Song (2009)
- Waking Up Is Hard to Do (2013)
- Band Car (2014)
- The Albion Rooms (2022)

Solo

- Rules (2017)
- Saves (2020)
- Cross Bearer EP (2024)

== Filmography ==
Year	Title	Role	Notes	Ref.
2010	I'm Here	Annie	Short film	
2017	The Icarus Line Must Die	Annie		
2021	Dashcam	Annie		
