= The Icarus Line Must Die =

- Theatrical poster
- Directed by: Michael Grodner
- Screenplay by: Michael Grodner; Joe Cardamone
- Produced by: Kristin Slaysman
- Cinematography: Jacob Mendel
- Music by: Joe Cardamone
- Distributed by: Dark Star Pictures
- Release date: June 22, 2017
- Running time: 82 minutes
- Country: United States
- Language: English

The Icarus Line Must Die is a 2017 American drama film directed by Michael Grodner, co-written by and starring Joe Cardamone of the post-hardcore band The Icarus Line. It is a semi-fictionalized account of the band's dissolution as they attempt to navigate the contemporary music industry of Los Angeles. The film also features appearances and performances from musicians Ariel Pink, Keith Morris, and Annie Hardy.

== Plot ==
In Los Angeles, Joe Cardamone, the singer of the indie rock band The Icarus Line, attempts to keep the nearly two-decades-long band intact amidst financial pressure and members choosing to move on to other projects. He unsuccessfully shops their new album to various record labels. Joe begins working as a producer recording other local musicians. Joe goes to visit Alvin DeGuzman, his former bass player, who is suffering from cancer. Meanwhile, Joe receives a series of threatening text messages from a member of The Cult, a band The Icarus Line previously opened for, over their confrontational performance which alienated The Cult's fans in attendance.

After pawning some of his musical equipment, Joe is met by his old bandmate Ron, who has recently become sober and is now working as a nurse. Ron unsuccessfully attempts to convince Joe to let him rejoin the band. Joe attends a party with his girlfriend Pearl, and is met by his friend, Annie], the singer and guitarist of Giant Drag, and her boyfriend Cadalack Ron. The two discuss Joe's financial struggles, and Annie suggests he is creating his own financial woes by adopting a scarcity complex.

Joe is tormented by nightmares in which he is being stalked. Later, Joe visits Annie at her home, where she regales him with reptilian and apocalyptic conspiracy theories, which he rebukes, and invites her to record a new song she has written at his studio. Annie performs an acoustic rendition of the track at his studio, and her intimate performance inspires him. Joe convinces one of his former bandmates to join them for a live concert at The Echo.

A short time later, Joe goes fishing on a pier with Alvin and his drummer Ben. Alvin who tells them that his chemotherapy treatments are proving effective. Joe reveals that, following the Echo performance, a major record label has expressed interest in releasing the band's album. As they leave the pier, Joe is approached at his car by a strange man who calls his name, before pointing a gun at him and pulling the trigger.

== Cast ==
- The Icarus Line as themselves
- Charlotte Cardamone as Charlotte
- Joe Cardamone as Joe
- Pearl Charles as Pearl
- Ben Hallett as Ben
- Annie Hardy as Annie
- Keith Morris as Keith
- Justin Pearson as Justin
- Ariel Pink as Ron
- Jerry Stahl as Jerry

== Release ==
The film opened theatrically in Los Angeles on June 22, 2018 before being made available digitally on July 22, 2018.

=== Critical response ===
Noel Murray of the Los Angeles Times praised the film, writing that it is "filled with wonderfully unruly and exciting music — including from [Annie] Hardy, who has perhaps the picture’s most moving moment, singing a song drawn from personal tragedy. Mostly, Grodner and Cardamone capture how rock ’n’ roll is an unglamorous grind of creative fervor and commercial compromise, where the biggest plans are undone by the need to have flaky musicians execute them." Pitchfork's Stuart Berman likened the film to Anvil! The Story of Anvil (2008), adding that it "gives this proudly insolent act the belated ceremonial suicide it deserves."

=== Home media ===
Dark Star Pictures released the film in on Blu-ray in collaboration with Vinegar Syndrome, made available through Vinegar Syndrome's web store in November 2022, pending a general release on December 27, 2022.
