= Adored =

Adored may refer to:

- The Adored, a band based in Los Angeles, California
- Adored (film), a 2003 LGBT-related drama film
- Adored (novel), a young adult novel by Cecily von Ziegesar
- "Adored", a song by Collective Soul from Afterwords, 2007
- "Adored", a song by Miranda Cosgrove from Sparks Fly, 2010
- "Adored", a song by Paris Hilton from Infinite Icon, 2024
- "Adored", a song by Poppy, 2016
