= Lemona (EP) =

EP by Giant Drag
- Released: June 2004
- Recorded: 2004
- Studio: Record Plant (Los Angeles); Dirty Little Studios (Los Angeles)
- Genre: Indie rock
- Length: 17:13
- Label: Leftwing; Wichita Recordings
- Producer: Giant Drag

Giant Drag chronology
| Lemona (2004) | Hearts and Unicorns (2005) |

Professional ratings
Review scores
| Source | Rating |
|---|---|
| AllMusic | 3/5 stars |

Lemona is the debut EP by the American indie rock band Giant Drag. It was first released in June 2004 by the independent Los Angeles–based label Leftwing Recordings, before receiving a wider repressing in the United Kingdom through Wichita Recordings.

== Recording ==
The EP was recorded in 2004 in Los Angeles at Record Plant and Dirty Little Studios.

== Release ==
Lemona was first released on compact disc by the independent label Leftwing Recordings in Los Angeles in June 2004, which sold so well that the label "couldn't press enough copies" to keep up with the demand. The EP was subsequently given a wider release in the United Kingdom by the London-based Wichita Recordings on January 25, 2005.

In June 2021, the band independently issued Lemona alongside their second EP, Swan Song, as a joint release on vinyl for the first time.

== Track listing ==
1. "This Isn't It" – 2:58
2. "Tired Yet" – 2:43
3. "Cordial Invitation" – 2:58
4. "YFLMD" – 2:53
5. "Jonah Ray is Aokay (But That's All Hearsay)" – 2:42

== Personnel ==
All personnel credits adapted from the album's liner notes.

Giant Drag

- Annie Hardy – vocals, guitar
- Micah Calabrese – drums, synthesizer

Engineering

- James Bairian – production
- Louis Castle – production
- John Golden – mastering
- J. D. Andrew – recording, mixing
