= Michael Berry Jr. =

British actor

- Born: Michael Joseph John Berry Jr. 1964 (age 60–61); Oxford, Oxfordshire, England
- Occupation: Actor
- Years active: 2003–present

Michael Joseph John Berry Jr. (born 1964) is an English actor, best known for portraying the Irish pirate Twigg in Pirates of the Caribbean: The Curse of the Black Pearl.

== Career ==
Berry is known for portraying supporting characters in well known films such as the man who kidnapped Julia Meade in Mission: Impossible III, the Romulan Tactical Officer in Star Trek, Bernard the Bull in Where the Wild Things Are, William in 13, the Russian mobster Vladi in The Hangover Part II and Silverlake Passerby in Ruby Sparks.

Berry is also a writer for numerous television shows and plays such as Spiderman and the Rope.

== Personal life ==
Berry resides in Los Angeles as of 2013.

== Filmography ==
=== Film ===
Year	Title	Role	Notes
2003	Pirates of the Caribbean: The Curse of the Black Pearl	Twigg	Credited as Michael Berry
2006	Mission: Impossible III	Julia's Kidnapper	
2008	Wednesday Again	Thin Man	
2008	The Cure for Cancer	Journey	Short film
2009	Family of Four	Carl	
2009	Star Trek	Romulan Tactical Officer	
2009	Where the Wild Things Are	Bernard the Bull	Voice
2010	I'm Here	Adam	Short film
2010	13	William	
2011	The Hangover Part II	Vladi	Nominated - People's Choice Award for Favorite Ensemble Movie Cast; Shared with the entire cast
2012	Look at Me	Doorman	
2012	Ruby Sparks	Silverlake Passerby	
2014	The Scribbler	Hogan the Dog	Voice

=== Television ===
Year	Title	Role	Notes
2003	Alias	Scott Kingsley	Episode: "The Two"
2007	The Unit	Bearded Man	Credited as Michael Berry; Episode: "Bedfellows"
