= The Adored =

American power pop/garage/punk band

- Origin: Los Angeles, California, United States
- Genres: Power pop, punk rock, mod revival, indie rock, pop punk
- Years active: 2003–2007
- Labels: V2 Records
- Members: Ryan George; Drew Bayers; Max Humphrey; Nathanael Keefer

The Adored were an American power pop, garage and punk band based in Los Angeles, California, United States. Until 2007, they were signed to V2 Records in North America (reportedly signed by former Black Flag and Circle Jerks frontman Keith Morris). They released a five-song EP in 2004, which featured guest vocals by Pete Shelley of Buzzcocks on two songs; and their debut LP, A New Language, was released in 2006.

The band was made up of Ryan George (vocals), Nathanael Keefer (drums), Drew Bayers (guitar) and Max Humphrey (bass). George and Keefer originally met as Central Coast teenagers, through George's straight edge hardcore punk band Carry On, with whom Keefer later played drums. Keefer later left Carry On and moved to Los Angeles, and George followed suit shortly after the release of their LP A Life Less Plagued.

Their relationship with the Buzzcocks began when Pete Shelley met the band at their first New York City show in 2004. The most obvious and frequently cited source of the band's name is The Stone Roses song "I Wanna Be Adored."

Following a Los Angeles Times feature in 2005, Alternative Press named The Adored one of their ' 100 Band You Need To Know', and A New Language earned them positive reviews from publications like the Washington Post, URB, power-pop magazines such as Amplifier and PopMatters, and "Band of the Day" features on Spin.com and NPR.org. Tours with Buzzcocks (in the UK and US), The Rakes and The Damned followed, as did a stint on Warped Tour In 2007, however, following the collapse of V2 Records in North America, Ryan George left the band. In spring 2007, several members of The Adored were reportedly backing up Annie Hardy of Giant Drag at Los Angeles-area shows.

The song "Not Having It" was featured in the two-part Grey's Anatomy episode "The Other Side of This Life", which doubled as a back door pilot for the spin-off series Private Practice. "TV Riot" is featured in the videogame Saints Row. A cover of the Rolling Stones' "Satisfaction" was included in Destroy All Humans 2.
