= Hearts and Unicorns =

Studio album by Giant Drag
- Released: September 13, 2005
- Recorded: 2005
- Studios: Dirty Little Studios (Los Angeles); Paramount Studios (Los Angeles)
- Genres: Indie rock; alternative rock
- Length: 49:01
- Label: Kickball
- Producers: Giant Drag; Louis Castle; James Barian

Giant Drag chronology
Lemona (2004)	Hearts and Unicorns (2005)	Waking Up Is Hard to Do (2013)

Hearts and Unicorns is the debut studio album by the American indie rock band Giant Drag. It was released September 13, 2005 in the United States and February 27, 2006, in the United Kingdom by Kickball Records. It was the second release by the band after their debut EP Lemona, released in 2004.

The album's UK release and subsequent 2006 North American re-pressing include a cover of Chris Isaak's "Wicked Game" as a bonus track.

== Recording ==
Hearts and Unicorns was recorded at Dirty Little Studios and Paramount Studios in Los Angeles, California in 2005. Regarding "Kevin Is Gay", Annie Hardy stated: "Kevin is just a guy though, the song is nothing to do with him. But this guy, a friend of ours, hacked into our website, so it's a response to him. We posted up on there, 'Kevin, stop posting all this stupid crap on our website. Come and see us tomorrow when we'll be debuting our new song "Kevin is Gay"'. And the title just stuck."

Hardy said in an interview that the clip at the beginning of the track is her imitating the sound of the shoryuken special move from the Street Fighter series of arcade games.

== Critical reception ==
Professional ratings
Review scores
Source	Rating
AllMusic	3.5/5 stars
NME	7/10 stars
Pitchfork	(6.8/10)
Rolling Stone	3.5/5 stars

Jason Crock of Pitchfork awarded the album a 6.8 out of 10 rating, noting: "All these silly song titles and nearly frightening studio patter scratch the surface of something, the way the snippets on a record like Surfer Rosa add another layer of inscrutability, but monochromatic guitars overwhelm the album and mute the few moments of quirk."

The Independent's Luiza Sauman awarded the album four out of five stars, describing it as a "heavenly, potty-mouthed mixture of My Bloody Valentine, Nirvana, and The Breeders... some songs you can give or take, but their promise always shines through." Sinéad Gleeson of The Irish Times also awarded the album four out of five stars, comparing it favorably to the work of Throwing Muses, My Bloody Valentine, and Mazzy Star, noting that the songs "view the rubbish heap of modern life through a distorted, shoegazing lens. Hardy sings, chain-smokes, plays guitar and bass, and writes the cruel, damaged-goods lyrics." A review published in The Daily Telegraph likened the album to the works of PJ Harvey, adding: "Giant Drag, shockingly but mainly pleasingly, are not just another pair of too-cool-for-school LA rock kids. Nor are they vacuous provocateurs. They're imaginative and playful."

Hot Press's Ed Power praised the album, commenting that it opened with a "dreamy blast of feedback and blizzard drifts of melody." Power described the album to be "As sweet as honey, as caustic as rattlesnake venom."

David Smyth of the Evening Standard gave the album a middling review, awarding it three out of five stars, noting that "Hardy has a way with an effects pedal and a wicked tongue... tracks such as "My Dick Sux" continue to give a false impression of the beauty within, although the exquisite "This Isn't It" suggests that when Hardy grows up she might write something really special."

Alternative radio station 97X ranked the album at number 48 in a list of the 97 best albums of 2005. Dispatch-Argus journalist Sean Leary also included the album in his list of the best albums of the year.

== Track listing ==
All tracks are written by Giant Drag, except where noted.

Hearts and Unicorns – Standard edition
No.	Title	Writer(s)	Length
1.	"Kevin is Gay"		3:02
2.	"Cordial Invitation"		2:59
3.	"This Isn't It"		3:03
4.	"YFLMD" ("You Fuck Like My Dad")		2:50
5.	"Pretty Little Neighbor"		3:20
6.	"Blunt Picket Fence"		2:50
7.	"High Friends in Places"		3:10
8.	"You're Full of Shit (Check Out My Sweet Riffs)"		2:46
9.	"Everything's Worse"		2:59
10.	"My Dick Sux"		3:48
11.	"Smashing"		4:11
12.	"Slayer"	Joe Cardamone	5:00
13.	"Untitled" (hidden track)		9:03
Total length:			49:01

Hearts and Unicorns – United Kingdom release and 2006 U.S. re-pressing
No.	Title	Writer(s)	Length
1.	"Kevin is Gay"		3:02
2.	"Cordial Invitation"		2:59
3.	"This Isn't It"		3:03
4.	"YFLMD" ("You Fuck Like My Dad")		2:50
5.	"Pretty Little Neighbor"		3:20
6.	"Blunt Picket Fence"		2:50
7.	"High Friends in Places"		3:10
8.	"You're Full of Shit (Check Out My Sweet Riffs)"		2:46
9.	"Everything's Worse"		2:59
10.	"My Dick Sux"		3:48
11.	"Smashing"		4:11
12.	"Slayer"	Joe Cardamone	5:00
13.	"Wicked Game"	Chris Isaak	4:15
14.	"Untitled" (hidden track)		9:03
Total length:			53:16

== Personnel ==
All personnel credits adapted from the album's liner notes.

Giant Drag

- Annie Hardy – lead vocals, guitar (1–11), bass (9, 11)
- Micah Calabrese – drums, synthesizer, guitar (1, 4, 7, 10)

Guest musicians

- Joe Cardamone – guitar (2, 12), backing vocals (2)
- Louis Castle – guitar (3), organ (6), trumpet (6), backing vocals (9–11)
- Alvin DeGuzman – guitar (12)
- Don Devore – bass (1, 4–5, 8, 12)
- Daniel Holden – bass (6)
- Gabe Garnicka – slide bass (6), guitar (5, 11), lap steel (9)
- Sandra Vu – flute

Engineering

- James Barian – production, bass (3, 10)
- Alan Yoshida – mastering
- Ryan Castle – production (13)
- Dave Sardy – production (13)

Art personnel

- Annie Hardy – art direction, illustrations
- Dan Monick – art direction, photography
- Wendy Higgs – A&R
