= If There Is a Reason to Study =

- 學習的理由
- Directed by: Adler Yang
- Produced by: Wuna Wu
- Starring: Li-Ann Chen, Pei-Ling Tsai, Yu-Xuan Lin, Xing-Hao Gong, Adler Yang
- Cinematography: Adler Yang, Yan-Fu Lin
- Edited by: Tzu-Yin Wu, Jia-Hsien Zhao, Yu-Ning Guo, Adler Yang
- Music by: Min-CHieh Shi, Adler Yang
- Production company: Awakening Lab
- Distributed by: Activator Marketing Licensing Co.
- Release date: August 12, 2016
- Running time: 96 minutes
- Country: Taiwan
- Language: Chinese

If There Is a Reason to Study (Native title: 學習的理由) is an ethnographic documentary film spanning 7 years directed by Adler Yang. The production of the film started in March 2009, when Yang was 14 years old, studying at the Humanity (RenWen) Junior High School as a grade 8 student. The film was theatrically released in Taiwan and Hong Kong since August 2016 by crowdfunding, screening at major theaters in Taipei, Taoyuan, Taichung, Kaohsiung, Yilan, Kowloon, etc. The film has also been selected in more than 10 film festivals internationally, receiving 11 awards and recognitions.

In the film, Yang documented the story of his friends' in the Humanity Junior High facing the high-stakes high school entrance exam, the Basic Competence Test (BCT), and followed them until their college years. The film not only examines how high-stakes testing and the tracking systems shape students' lives in the long run but also uncovers a more common struggle beyond school, which Yang calls Allocation Dependence: As long as one grows a dependency on allocated resources or/and the resource allocation system, one will strive to fit into the allocation criteria, even at the cost of, including but not limited to, alienation, waste (i.e., some qualities have to be trimmed off/disposed of), disparity (i.e., every person's standing point are more or less advantageous or disadvantageous in the face of the criteria), exhaustion (i.e., people's behaviors shift away from resource regeneration and focus on fitting into the allocation criteria), and fragility (i.e., people loses their capability of obtaining and regenerating resource if, by any reason, the allocation cease to function).

== Reception and influence ==
Originally titled The Soul -- I Don't Want the BCT, the film has been publicly known in Taiwan since 2010, as the project was surprisingly selected as a grantee by the Public Television Service. Since then, Yang and his team at an average age of 15 have been continually invited to educational meetings and conferences to represent the voice of students, joining the public discourse of education reform.

First started in 2001, the BCT was announced to be replaced in a few years by President Ma Ying-Jeou on January 1, 2011. In 2013, the last BCT had ended, replaced by the Comprehensive Assessment Program in 2014.

In the 2014 South Taiwan Film Festival, Golden Bell Award Best Director John Hsu considered If There is a Reason to Study one of the three most surprising films in the festival, praising that it is the "best work among all recent films addressing the education and testing culture in Taiwan. Talented and sincere."

On August 12, 2016, Deputy Minister of Education Chen Liang-gee met with Yang and his teammates for their contribution to Taiwanese education, invited them to participate in future collaborations, and praised the film for its authentic representation of the education in Taiwan.

The film was praised as the "epitome of 2016 Taiwanese Movies" by film critic and Golden Horse Film Festival judge Bing-Hong Zheng. He also noted that If There is a Reason to Study is the most successful crowdfunded Taiwanese documentary project in 2016, reaching 282% of its initial goal

The film's Chinese title "學習的理由(literal translation: reason to study)" has since then become a common term widely used in the education discourse in Taiwan even when the actual film was not being conversed.

Based on this documentary and other ethnographic data not used in the film's final version, Yang continues to develop his research and present his findings internationally on the relations between/mechanisms underlying educational practices and systemic human struggles.
