= Basic Competence Test for Junior High School Students =

School standardized test in Taiwan

The Basic Competence Test for Junior High School Students (Chinese: 國民中學學生基本學力測驗) is a standardized exam for junior high school students in Taiwan. It is also referred to as the "junior group test" and "group test". Test scores are used for enrollment in high school.

== See also ==
- Education in Taiwan
