= Images of Liberation =

- Directed by: Lars von Trier
- Written by: Lars von Trier; Tom Elling
- Produced by: Per Årman
- Starring: Edward Fleming; Kirsten Olesen
- Cinematography: Tom Elling
- Edited by: Tómas Gislason
- Production company: National Film School of Denmark
- Distributed by: National Film School of Denmark
- Release date: 30 June 1982
- Running time: 57 minutes
- Country: Denmark
- Language: Danish

Images of Liberation (Danish: Befrielsesbilleder) is a 1982 Danish drama film directed by Lars von Trier.

The film was Trier's graduation film from the National Film School of Denmark. It became the first ever Danish school film to receive regular theatrical distribution. It was screened in the Panorama section of the 34th Berlin International Film Festival.

== Plot ==
The story is set in Copenhagen during World War II, and follows a German officer who visits his Danish mistress the days after the occupation of Denmark has ended.

== Cast ==
- Edward Fleming as Leo Mendel
- Kirsten Olesen as Esther
