= I'm Handsome (Since 2009) =

2026 Indian Telugu-language drama film

- Theatrical release poster
- Directed by: Durgha Dev Naidu
- Written by: Durgha Dev Naidu
- Produced by: Kedar Nath
- Starring: Durgha Dev Naidu; Anvisha Kranthi; Kittayya; Roopa Kala; Kedar Shankar
- Cinematography: S. Nagarjuna Royal
- Edited by: Shiva Manchala
- Music by: N. S. Prasu
- Production company: Sri K Films
- Release date: 12 June 2026
- Country: India
- Language: Telugu

I'm Handsome (Since 2009) is a 2026 Indian Telugu drama film written and directed by Durgha Dev Naidu. Produced by Kedar Nath and distributed by Sri K Films, it stars Naidu, Anvisha Kranthi, Kittayya, Rupa Kala and Kedar Shankar. The film was released in theaters on 12 June 2026.

== Premise ==
Suri, a young man from a rural village, shares a close bond with his father Markandeyulu, a stonemason who dreams of providing his son with a better future. Suri falls in love with Kavya, a doctor who visits his village to conduct a medical camp. However, Kavya remains distrustful of Suri due to her negative experiences in past relationships. As Suri attempts to win her affection, a tragic incident involving his father changes his life and leads him to make a difficult decision.

== Cast ==
- Durgha Dev Naidu as Suri
- Anvisha Kranthi as Kavya
- Kittayya as Markandeyulu
- Rupa Kala as Malathi
- Phanindra Devarapalli
- Ashok Andra
- Prerana Choudary
- Siri Jupalli
- Kedar Shankar

== Production ==
The film was presented by Mahesh Gudaru under the banner of Sri K Films and produced by Kedar Nath. Durgha Dev Naidu handled the story, screenplay, dialogues and direction. Cinematography was by S. Nagarjuna Royal, editing by Shiva Manchala and music by N. S. Prasu.

During a pre-release event held at Prasad Film Labs in Hyderabad, Naidu expressed confidence in the project. Telugu film producer K.L. Damodar Prasad, the chief guest of the event, called Naidu a "genuine talent", and commended him for "handling both acting and directing responsibilities."

== Music ==
The soundtrack album and background score for the film were composed by N. S. Prasu, with lyrics written by Kiran Olety. The soundtrack consists of three songs, released on the K Music YouTube channel in June 2026.

Track listing
No.	Title	Lyrics	Singer(s)	Length
1.	"Maa Ooru Andamaina Brindavanam"	Kiran Olety	Nataraj Devarakonda	4:13
2.	"Maa Palle Veedhullo"	Kiran Olety	Prasad MSP	3:52
3.	"Kannara Vinnara"	Kiran Olety	Harsha Vardhan	4:08
Total length:				12:13

== Release ==
The film was released theatrically on 12 June 2026.

== Reception ==
The film received positive reviews from critics. Suhas Sistu of The Hans India rated the movie 2.75/5, describing it as "an engaging emotional journey." Sunil Boddula of News18 Telugu praised Durga Dev Naidu's acting and direction, writing that he "wonderfully revealed the beauty of the countryside and the pure emotions of the people on the screen." Ramu Chinthakindhi of Times Now wrote that the film was "a good movie full of pure love and family emotions." 123Telugu rated the film 3/5, praised Prasu's soundtrack, and wrote, "The songs are pleasant, and the background score serves as a major asset to the film."
