= Ithalukalkappuram =

- Ithalukalkappuram
- Directed by: Amal Joy Arukulasseril
- Written by: Midhun Mahesh
- Produced by: Jayasankar Pillai
- Starring: Lalu James Varghese; Kavya Madhav; Abhin Siddharth; Neethu Krishna; Jithin S Thomas; Raja Laxmi
- Cinematography: Lijo John
- Edited by: Arun.PG
- Music by: Joel Johns
- Production companies: Aadi Creations Ins, Canada; In association with Celebrate Entertainments
- Release date: 4 June 2017
- Running time: 14.05 minutes
- Country: India
- Language: Malayalam

Ithalukalkappuram is a 2017 Malayalam-language Indian Short film directed by Amal Joy Arukulasseril, starring Lalu James Varghese, Kavya Madhav, Abhin Siddharth, Neethu Krishna, Jithin S Thomas and Raja Laxmi. The film released on YouTube had 1 million views within one week, a record for Malayalam short film industry.

Director Amal Joy Arukulasseril complained that the film was uploaded by several channels without official permission and he expressed regret on the same.

== Summary ==
Ithalukalkappuram tells a love story of Aby and Annie, but unexpected happenings in their life makes them realize the true life.

== Cast ==
- Lalu James Varghese
- Kavya Madhav
- Abhin Siddharth
- Neethu Krishna
- Jithin S Thomas
- Raja Laxmi

== Production ==
The shooting of the film was completed in a span of 3 days time from 28 to 30 December 2016. The film made on a shoestring budget of ₹1.5 lakh (US$1,600) was shot at several locations of Ernakulam and Alappuzha.
