= Waking Up Is Hard to Do =

Studio album by Giant Drag
- Released: March 5, 2013
- Recorded: 2007–2012
- Genre: Alternative rock, indie rock
- Length: 45:08
- Label: Full Psycho
- Producer: Joe Cardamone

Giant Drag chronology
Swan Song (2010)	Waking Up Is Hard to Do (2013)

Waking Up Is Hard to Do is the second studio album by the American indie rock band Giant Drag, released on March 5, 2013 on Full Psycho Records, the band's own label. It is the band's first full-length release of original material since Hearts and Unicorns (2005) and was released as a digital download on Giant Drag's Bandcamp music store.

== Reception ==
Marie Wood of Drowned In Sound gave the album an 8 out of 10 rating, writing: "The main draw of the album... is that like Daniel Johnston, Eels and Pinkerton-era Weezer, Hardy still strikes the golden balance of juxtaposing fear, despair and rejection with sugary pop melodies and a dry near arid sense of humour that sweetens the blow of the heavy subjects at hand making them highly relatable."

== Track listing ==
No.	Title	Length
1.	"90210"	3:54
2.	"We Like the Weather"	3:26
3.	"Won't Come Around"	3:49
4.	"Do It"	5:08
5.	"Firestorm"	3:16
6.	"Garbage Heart"	3:25
7.	"Meowch"	4:32
8.	"Messif My Face"	3:37
9.	"Dennis the Pennis"	4:01
10.	"Sobriety Is a Sobering Experience"	2:41
11.	"Heart Carl"	3:39
12.	"Seen the Light"	3:40

Deluxe edition bonus EP (What I Know About Nothing)
No.	Title	Length
1.	"Firestorm" (demo)
2.	"Sobriety Is a Sobering Experience" (demo)	2:55
3.	"Dennis the Pennis" (demo)
4.	"Messif My Face" (demo)
5.	"Meowch" (demo)
6.	"Heart Carl" (demo)	3:42
