= Iso lo =

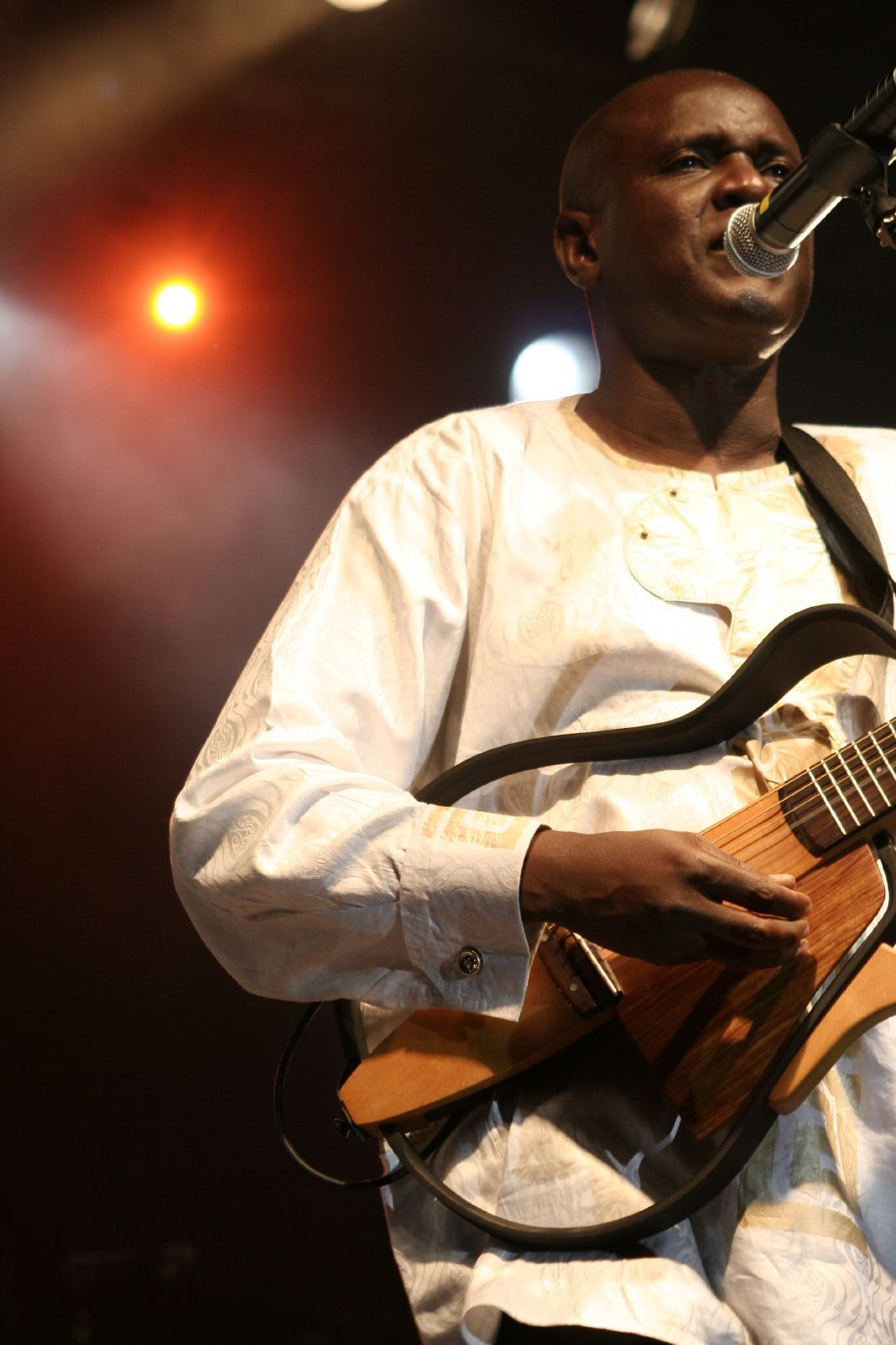
- Ismael Lo
- Directed by: Mansour Sora Wade
- Produced by: La Huit – Kus, KUS Production, Arcanal, CCF de Dakar
- Starring: Ismaël Lô
- Cinematography: Pape Gora Seck
- Edited by: Claude Santiago
- Music by: Ismaël Lô
- Release date: 1994
- Running time: 46 minutes
- Countries: France; Senegal

Iso lo is a 1994 documentary film.

== Synopsis ==
A glimpse into Ismaël Lô's musical universe. Shot during one of his tours, this peregrination into Africa's heart directed by Mansour Sora Wade will take us to the sources of his music.
