= Inventing Our Life: The Kibbutz Experiment =

- Film poster
- Directed by: Toby Perl Freilich
- Written by: Toby Perl Freilich
- Produced by: Toby Perl Freilich
- Cinematography: Itamar Hadar
- Edited by: Juliet Weber
- Music by: Beit Habubot
- Distributed by: First Run Features (US)
- Release date: September 7, 2010
- Running time: 79 minutes
- Countries: Israel; United States
- Languages: Hebrew; English

Inventing Our Life: The Kibbutz Experiment is a 2010 documentary film directed by Toby Perl Freilich.

The film examines the 100-year history of Israel's kibbutz movement as a modern generation struggles to ensure its survival amidst painful reforms and a new capitalist reality. Among those interviewed are first, second and third generation members from kibbutzim like Degania, the flagship commune established in 1910; Hulda, once near collapse and recently privatized; Sasa, the first to be settled entirely by Jews from America and today Israel's wealthiest kibbutz; and Tamuz, an urban kibbutz founded in 1987 and located in Beit Shemesh.

== Critical reception ==
The film received generally favorable reviews from critics. At Rotten Tomatoes, the film holds a rating of 82%, based on 11 reviews and an average rating of 7.3/10. It also has a score of 67 on Metacritic based on six reviews.
