= I Can't Go Home =

- Directed by: Joana Hadjithomas; Khalil Joreige
- Written by: Joana Hadjithomas; Khalil Joreige
- Cinematography: Jeanne Lapoirie
- Release date: 2007
- Running time: 90 minutes
- Country: Lebanon
- Languages: Arabic and French

I Can't Go Home is a 2007 Lebanese film and the third film directed by Joana Hadjithomas and Khalil Joreige.

This film was selected in the Atelier of the Cinefondation at the 2007 Cannes Film Festival.

== Plot summary ==
The 2006 Lebanon war erupts, a Lebanese filmmaker woman who is in Paris for a job seeks information about the war while her husband is stuck in the conflict.

== See also ==
- A Perfect Day (2005 film)
