= Ibtida: The Beginning =

Indian film (2015)

Ibtida, The Beginning is a 2015 Indian Urdu-language philosophical drama film directed and edited by Ali Emran and produced by Mrs. Yaqout Mushtaq under the banner Hot Ice. Loosely inspired by Ayn Rand’s novel The Fountainhead, the film explores themes of artistic integrity, societal conformity, and individualism. It was distributed by Chinaar Mediaworks and released in June 2015.

== Plot ==
Set against the evolving artistic and architectural backdrop of Kashmir, Ibtida, The Beginning follows the journey of Zahir, a principled and visionary young architect who refuses to compromise his creative ideals for mainstream acceptance. In a society that values imitation and conformity, Zahir finds himself at odds with institutional systems and cultural expectations.

His ideological opposite, Gautam, is a commercially successful architect who thrives by conforming to public tastes and political convenience. The tension between the two characters underscores the film's central philosophical conflict.

Disha, torn between Zahir's unyielding individualism and the comfort of societal norms, personifies the emotional dilemma of choosing authenticity over acceptance. The antagonist, Taha, manipulates public opinion and bureaucratic power to undermine Zahir, highlighting the cost of rebellion in a conformist world.

As Zahir faces betrayal, isolation, and professional sabotage, the film culminates in a powerful assertion of creative freedom and personal truth, asserting that staying true to one's ideals is the highest form of success.

== Cast ==
- Zameer Ashai
- Lt. Parveez Masoodi
- Bashir Dada
- Shahid Gulfam
- Tariq Jameel
- Preerna Bhat
- Ali Emran

== Production ==
Ibtida, The Beginning was developed and produced by Hot Ice, a regional production house known for its focus on independent and culturally rooted cinema. The film's visual style blends realism with symbolic imagery, crafted by Ali Emran's multifaceted contribution as director, cinematographer, and editor.

== Themes and influence ==
The film is a philosophical exploration of individualism vs collectivism, drawing heavy inspiration from Ayn Rand's Objectivist ideology. Though not a direct adaptation, the narrative of Zahir parallels the protagonist of The Fountainhead, transposed into the socio-political milieu of contemporary Kashmir. The story questions whether success is defined by public validation or personal integrity.

== Festival screenings and reception ==
The film was showcased in various regional film forums. Notably, it featured in the two-day Kashmir Rainbow Film Festival at Tagore Hall, Srinagar (August 2024), where it was highlighted for its exploration of individualism inspired by The Fountainhead, alongside performances by Zameer Ashai and Bashir Dada.

Additionally, Ibtida received critical attention from The Pioneer, praising how "Sharang Bhaskaran… talks to the filmmaker" about the successful adaptation of Rand's philosophy through poetic Urdu dialogues and an earthy, philosophical narrative.

== Release and reception ==
Released on its initial theatrical run in June 2015, the film achieved a limited release but found subsequent screening opportunities at cultural venues like the India Habitat Centre and film festivals in Kashmir. It earned accolades for its bold narrative, philosophical depth, and regional significance, including awards such as "Best Feature Film" at the Kashmir International Film Festival.
