= Cadalack Ron =

American rapper

- Also known as: Robado; The Methadone Don; Black Tar Rap Star; Caddy 3.0
- Born: Robert Paulson; April 28, 1981
- Origin: Los Angeles, California, U.S.
- Died: January 22, 2016 (aged 34)
- Genre: Hip-hop
- Occupation: Rapper
- Years active: 2000–2016
- Label: Machina Muerte

Robert Paulson (April 28, 1981 – January 22, 2016), better known by his stage name Cadalack Ron, was an American rapper from Los Angeles, California.

== Early life ==
Robert Paulson was a childhood friend and elementary school classmate of Josh Groban.

== Career ==
Robert Paulson based his material on his life experiences, including his drug addictions. In addition to the moniker "Cadalack Ron", he also performed under the monikers "The Methadone Don" and "Black Tar Rap Star", alluding to his dependency. In 2014, he attracted negative publicity for footage in which he appeared to inject himself with drugs during a rap battle. His appearance in that battle was described by Peter Cashmore of The Guardian as having "gone from looking like Kid Rock, to looking like a kid on rock". Paulson later confirmed that he had only injected himself with Gatorade. In a 2015 interview, he claimed to be sober, and to have had a phase of ejaculating blood after giving up steroids. During that time, he performed under the moniker "Caddy 3.0".

== Death and legacy ==
In January 2016, Robert Paulson died at the age of 34. He is survived by his ex-wife and two sons, Lion and Elijah Blue. His ex-wife did not want to publicly reveal his cause of death. His cause of death was reported by the L.A. County Medical-Coroner to be accidental caused by mixed drug toxicity.

In March 2015, Annie Hardy gave birth to Paulson's son Silvio. Silvio died at the age of 17 days of SIDS.

== Discography ==
=== Studio albums ===
- Space Cadalack (2011) (with Innaspace)
- Times Is Hard (2012) (with Briefcase)
- Black Tar Rap Star: The China White Edition (2013)
- Burnt to a Crisp or Bloody as Hell (2015)

=== EPs ===
- Junkies in Paris EP (2014) (with Paris Zax)
- The Philthy '81 El Dorado EP (2014)
