= Iran: Hot Tea, Cool Conversations =

- film poster
- Directed by: Brenden Hamilton
- Written by: Narration script: Brenden Hamilton; Mehdi Ghafourifar; Jillayn Le Grand; Alston Ghafourifar; Jenny Lenore Rosenbaum
- Produced by: Mehdi Ghafourifar; Brenden Hamilton
- Starring: Gerald A. Dekker; Farzaneh Khademi; Kimia Sagarchi
- Cinematography: Brenden Hamilton
- Edited by: Brenden Hamilton
- Production company: Golden Gate Cinema
- Distributed by: Golden Gate Cinema
- Release dates: September 14, 2008 (limited); March 5, 2009 (DVD)
- Running time: 78 minutes

Iran: Hot Tea, Cool Conversations is a 2008 documentary film directed by Brenden Hamilton and produced by Hamilton and businessman Mehdi Ghafourifar about the people of Iran, to promote Citizen Diplomacy and a Global Community.

== Synopsis ==
The documentary sets out to depict the contrast between feuding governments and its citizens, and chronicles Brenden Hamilton's journey to Iran as an American college student. The film was produced to be an example of Citizen Diplomacy with Hamilton’s unscripted interviews with local Iranian citizens gathered over a period of 6 weeks of shooting. Hamilton made the film in an effort to cut through political tensions and unveil a country of compassionate people who desire peace and friendship with America and the West.

== Background ==
The film was developed by San Francisco-based entertainment production studio, Gold Gate Cinema, LLC. Executive Producer Mehdi Ghafourifar is an Iranian-American author and businessman. Ghafourifar co-produced the film. Director Brenden Hamilton is a filmmaker. Early films include the feature documentary “Bound” (2006). Later, Hamilton directed and co-produced Iran: Hot Tea, Cool Conversations (2008). In an interview on the subject, Hamilton shared that the on-the-ground filming occurred over a period of 6 weeks and that he had never traveled to Iran previously. The film took two years to complete.

== Reception ==
Writing for San Jose State University's Spartan Daily, Ryan Buchan said: "This movie does not seem to force a view down your throat the entire time, but instead gives you a feeling that you are getting a genuine view that is not distorted to fulfill a personal agenda."
