= Is He My Girlfriend? =

¿Mi novia es él?
- Theatrical release poster
- Directed by: Coco Bravo; Edwin Sierra
- Written by: Edwin Sierra
- Produced by: Marcos Camacho
- Starring: Gregorio Pernía; Edwin Sierra; Camucha Negrete
- Cinematography: Andres Paul Magallanes
- Music by: Edwin Sierra; Armando Quiróz
- Production companies: New Century Films; Sierra Studios
- Release date: August 31, 2019
- Running time: 89 minutes
- Country: Peru
- Language: Spanish

Is He My Girlfriend? (Spanish: ¿Mi novia es él?) is a 2019 Peruvian comedy film directed by Coco Bravo & Edwin Sierra. It stars Colombian actor Gregorio Pernía, Melissa Paredes and Edwin Sierra.

== Synopsis ==
Tony (Gregorio Pernia), a film producer, arrives at a hotel in Tarapoto. There he meets a famous artist from the area, 'La Fuana' (Edwin Sierra).

== Cast ==
The actors participating in this film are:

- Gregorio Pernía as Tony
- Melissa Paredes as Lucerito
- Edwin Sierra as Catalina
- Carlos Solano as Bryan
- Camucha Negrete as Sor Rita

== Reception ==
The film premiered on August 31, 2019. On its first day, the film had 10,439 viewers, and at the end of the week it was in third place among the most viewed films in Peru. But, it was soon withdrawn from several theaters for unclear reasons.
