= If I Was She =

Film

- Directed by: Stéphane Clavier
- Produced by: Jean-Luc Goossens
- Starring: Hélène de Fougerolles; Thierry Lhermitte; Hippolyte Girardot; Alexia Portal
- Release date: 2004
- Running time: 95 minutes
- Countries: France, Belgium
- Language: English

If I Was She (French: Si J'etais Elle) is a 2004 French-Belgian television drama film directed by Stéphane Clavier.

== Synopsis ==
Alex, a macho man separated from his wife, suddenly finds himself transformed into a blonde woman. To hide her identity, she calls herself Alice and tries with her female body to win back his wife.

== Cast ==
- Hélène de Fougerolles as Alice
- Hippolyte Girardot as Alex
- Thierry Lhermitte as Didier
- Alexia Portal as Léa
- Éric Caravaca as Nicolas
- Catherine Demaiffe as The Secretary
- Cathy Boquet as The Beautician
- Mathilde Nardone as Sophie
- Eva Nardone as Zoé
- Julie Mbali as Sandrine
- Laëtitia de Ridder as Jennifer
- Yves Claessens as The Boss
- Laurence Katina as The Fashion Journalist
- Jacky Druault as The Repairer
