= Giant Drag =

American indie rock band

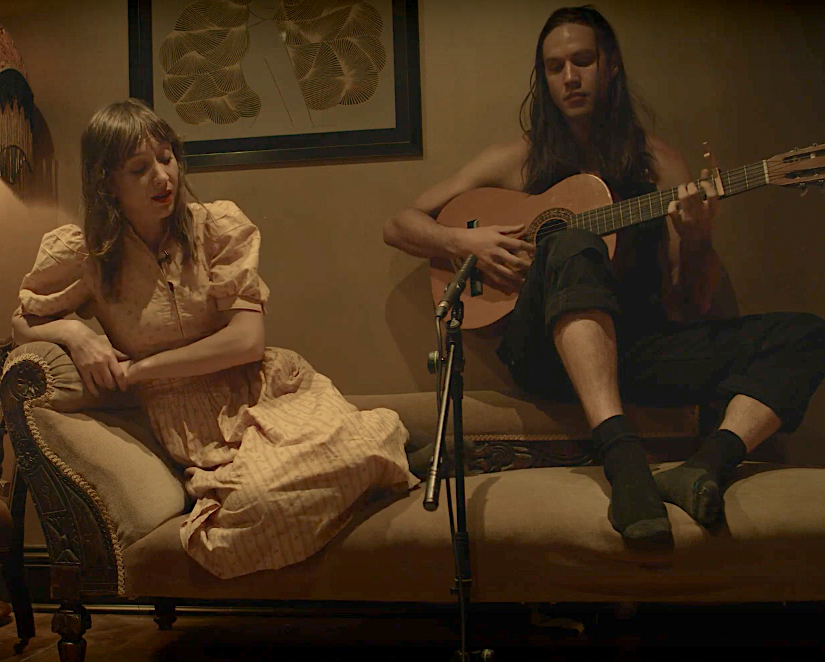
- Hardy and Collin Deatherage in 2022

Background information
- Origin: Los Angeles, California, U.S.
- Genres: Indie rock; alternative rock
- Years active: 2003–present
- Labels: Interscope; Kickball; Wichita; Full Psycho
- Members: Annie Hardy; Collin Deatherage
- Past members: Micah Calabrese; Dakota Floeter; Eli Smith; Alvin DeGuzman; Bobby Vega
- Website: http://www.patreon.com/anniehardy

Giant Drag is an American indie rock band formed in Los Angeles, California, in 2003 by singer and guitarist Annie Hardy and drummer and keyboardist Micah Calabrese. After releasing their debut EP, Lemona in 2004, the band released their debut studio album, Hearts and Unicorns (2005) through Kickball Records, a subsidiary of Interscope.

Interscope dropped the band from their label after issuing their single, "This Isn't It", in 2006, and Calabrese subsequently left the project. Hardy continued to record material for the band, and their second album, Waking Up is Hard to Do, was self-released in 2013 through their own label, Full Psycho Records.

In 2020, Hardy revealed she had written and recorded a third album with former Klaxons singer Jamie Reynolds in London.

== History ==
=== 2003–2013 ===
Hardy and Calabrese performing with Giant Drag at South by Southwest, 2006

Giant Drag was formed in Los Angeles in May 2003 by singer and guitarist Annie Hardy and drummer Micah Calabrese. The two became acquainted initially in 2001, as Calabrese was a co-worker of Hardy's mother at the internet company she was employed at, though they later formally met in 2003 after two of their mutual friends began dating. The two considered hiring a bassist to join the group, but instead, Calabrese began performing bass using a synthesizer with one hand, while drumming with the other. Performing both roles limited Calabrese's drumming performance, but soon became a stylistic element of the duo's music.

The band released their first EP, Lemona in 2004. Their debut album, Hearts and Unicorns, came out the following year through Kickball Records, a subsidiary of Interscope. The group toured in England in the fall of 2005, opening for Nine Black Alps to support the album. In 2006, they released their single "This Isn't It" before Interscope dropped them from the label. Between 2006 and 2008, the band toured internationally as an opening act for The Jesus and Mary Chain, Scissor Sisters, Pretty Girls Make Graves, Nine Black Alps, The Lemonheads, and The Cribs, and were named by the NME as one of the "big things in 2006". They also performed in the Coachella Valley Music and Arts Festival in 2006.

During this time, Hardy performed as a guest vocalist on the track "Pink Cellphone" from the 2006 Deftones album entitled Saturday Night Wrist. In the summer of 2007, the band's cover of Chris Isaak's "Wicked Game" was used in the promos for season 5 of the FX Networks series Nip/Tuck. During this period, Calabrese left and rejoined the band several times. In November 2007, a cover of Madonna's "Oh Father" was released by the band on the tribute album Through the Wilderness.

In December 2008, NME announced that Hardy was suffering from muscle disorder fibromyalgia. According to College News, her condition was later referenced in Paul Avion's song "Fibromyalgia". In January 2010, fellow L.A. musician Paul Avion chose "Kevin is Gay" to kick off a series of articles about Africa for Spin Earth. The Swan Song EP was released on February 16, 2010.

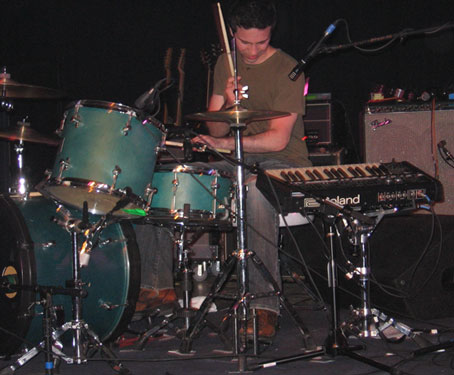
Calabrese performing with Giant Drag, 2006

In December 2010, Hardy's Twitter account mentioned a new full-length album had been completed, with no firm date set for release yet. In a 2011 interview with Collapse Board, Hardy commented on the group's debut record, Hearts and Unicorns:

Basically when I recorded the record it was... I felt like very detached from the whole process. I didn’t want to play guitar, my feelings got all hurt when I got dropped from Interscope and somebody said that ‘your guitar playing is deplorable’ – not to my face but they did say it. Sonically, it’s not what I want out of a record; I still prefer the four-track demos I made in 2006 to the finished product.

On February 9, 2012, Giant Drag released the alternative version of the band's song "Drugs" via Hardy's Bandcamp page, and another song called "Firestorm". On February 14, 2012, the band announced a new format of digital releases deemed "twosies," a format consisting of two tracks in one release. The first "twosie" was released on the same day of the announcement, titled Annie Hardy and The Wallpaper Demos, consisting of the tracks "Out At Sea" and "Say What You Will". On March 6, 2012, a new "twosie" was released, Hearts and Unicorns Outtakes and Unreleased Rarity.

On February 13, 2013, Giant Drag were named as one of the "unfairly forgotten bands of the 2000s" by NME. On March 5, 2013, the band's long-awaited second album, Waking Up is Hard to Do was released as a digital download on Giant Drag's Bandcamp music store. It marked the band's first full-length release of original material since Hearts and Unicorns (2005).

=== 2014–present ===
In March 2014, the band released the EP Band Car, also via Bandcamp.

In 2020, while Hardy was quarantined for COVID-19 restrictions in London prior to shooting the horror film Dashcam, in which she starred, she recorded Giant Drag's third studio album at The Libertines' recording studio, The Albion Rooms, alongside another secret project. The material was recorded with Jamie Reynolds, formerly of the English rock group Klaxons. Commenting on the recording, Hardy stated: "I think I was an idiot savant before, or just an idiot – I'm not sure. I could write songs but I wasn't really invested. I was always really sedated, taking a lot of pills and whatnot. Now I'm very present and I know what I'm doing for the first time."

In 2021, the band independently issued the EPs Lemona and Swan Song as a joint release on vinyl for the first time. In June 2022, the band, featuring Hardy and drummer Collin Deatherage, released the track "Devil Inside", which had previously been recorded for their EP Band Car; the track was featured as a promotional single for the horror film Dashcam (2021), in which Hardy starred.

In October 2026, the band released the single and music video for "Song for My Funeral." The single is from the group's forthcoming album, produced by Joe Cardamone, who also directed the music video.

== Musical style and influences ==
Giant Drag's sound has been described by several music publications as "nü-grunge". The band has also been compared to groups such as My Bloody Valentine, The Breeders, PJ Harvey, and Mazzy Star although the band does not completely agree with some of the comparisons and Hardy has shown herself to be especially confused by Breeders comparisons. It has been suggested by Hardy and another journalist that most articles that have been written about Giant Drag are re-wordings of their press pack, which compared them to such bands. Some music critics, such as Bobby Hankinson of The Boston Globe, likened Hardy's vocals and guitar playing to that of Liz Phair and Courtney Love.

Hardy has named various rock acts as influences, including Babes in Toyland, Hole, The Beatles, The Misfits, the Descendents, and Danzig.

Hardy's lyrics and live performances have attracted attention for their blunt and sometimes humorous nature, as well as her crass sense of humor. Hardy commented that this lyrical approach has been her "long-term defense mechanism. When dealing with something painful and honest and vulnerable you've got to come back and attack that subject with equal amounts of humour and then that kind of then softens the blow."

Their song titles are sometimes similarly humorous, such as "Kevin Is Gay," "My Dick Sux," "High Friends in Places," and "YFLMD"—an acronym for "You Fuck Like My Dad". Live performances were often notable for Hardy's monologues in-between songs while Calabrese set up his synthesizer. During performances in 2006 the duo covered Chris Isaak's "Wicked Game." Hardy jokingly introduced the song by telling a variation on the basic story that she wrote the song for Chris Isaak when she was 8, and that he stole it from her after a love affair, and that she saw him years later on MTV singing "her" song "rolling around in the sand with some hooker."

== Personnel ==
- Annie Hardy – vocals, guitar
- Collin Deatherage – drums, bass
- Micah Calabrese – drums, keyboards, synthesizer (2003–2011)
- Eli Smith – drums, keyboards (2004–2005)
- Bobby Vega – drums
- Alvin DeGuzman – bass

== Discography ==
=== Studio albums ===
- Hearts and Unicorns (2005)
- Waking Up Is Hard to Do (2013)

=== Singles ===
- "Kevin Is Gay" (2005)
- "This Isn't It" (2006)
- "Wicked Game" (2006)
- "Devil Inside" (2022)
- "Song for My Funeral" (2026)

=== Extended plays ===
- Lemona (2004)
- Swan Song (2010)
- Band Car (2014)
- Devil Inside the Albion Rooms (2022)

=== Live albums ===
- Shredding Leeds, Live in England (2013)

== Videography ==
- "This Isn't It" (directed by G.J. Echternkamp)
- "Kevin Is Gay" (directed by G.J. Echternkamp)
- "Stuff to Live For" (directed by G.J. Echternkamp)
- "Do It" (directed by Lance Arnao lavisuals.com)
- "90210" (directed by Annie Hardy)
- "Garbage Heart" (directed by Annie Hardy and Amos Memon)
- "Sobriety Is A Sobering Experience" (directed by Annie Hardy and Jana Jordan)
- "We Like the Weather" (directed by Colin Maccubbin)
- "Won't Come Around" (directed by Annie Hardy and Colin Maccubbin)
- "Song for My Funeral" (directed by Joe Cardamone)
